= List of best-selling music artists =

This list of best-selling music artists includes musical artists from the 20th century to the present with claims of 75 million or more record sales worldwide. The tables list artists in descending order by claimed sales; artists with equal claimed sales are ranked by certified units. Numbers for claimed-sales and certified-units include sales of albums, singles, compilation albums, and music videos as well as downloads of singles and full-length albums. Sales figures, such as those from SoundScan, which are sometimes published by Billboard, are not included in the certified-units column.

== Definitions ==
The Recording Industry Association of America (RIAA) and almost all other certifying bodies count streaming towards gold and platinum thresholds required for certification. RIAA counts 10 downloads of individual tracks as well as 1,500 audio/video streams as an equivalent to one unit of album, including those from singles released before the album release. Theoretically, if one song were streamed 1.5 billion times on YouTube, the single would be certified diamond and its album could be certified platinum, thus generating a combined total of 11 million certified units.

Issued certifications for songs which have been recorded by multiple artists, including featured artists, are added to each artist's total amount of certified units, as all the artists would have played a significant part in a song. For example, "This Is What You Came For" include Rihanna and Calvin Harris, while "Where Them Girls At" include Flo Rida and Nicki Minaj, so the certifications issued for these songs are added to the total amount of certified units for all involved artists. However, the certifications issued for songs that have been recorded by four or more artists are not included, as the artists involved would have played minor roles; examples include Kanye West's "Monster" and "All Day". (Note: Below you can get an understanding as to when certifications for songs are added to the total certified sales of the listed artists.: One lead artist and one featured artist. (The issued certification(s) should be added to the total of both, the lead artist and the featured artist as both will have almost equal amount of part).; Two lead artists.(The issued certification(s) should be added to the total of both lead artists as both will have almost equal amount of part).; Two lead artists and one featured artist. (The issued certification(s) should be added to the total of both lead artists as well as the featured artist. Both lead artists will play a significant part in a song and the part of the featured artist also should be significant enough).; One lead artist and two featured artists. (The issued certification(s) should be added to the total of the lead artist and to the total of both featured artists as almost all should have equal amount of part).)

== By reputed sales ==
=== Over 250 million ===
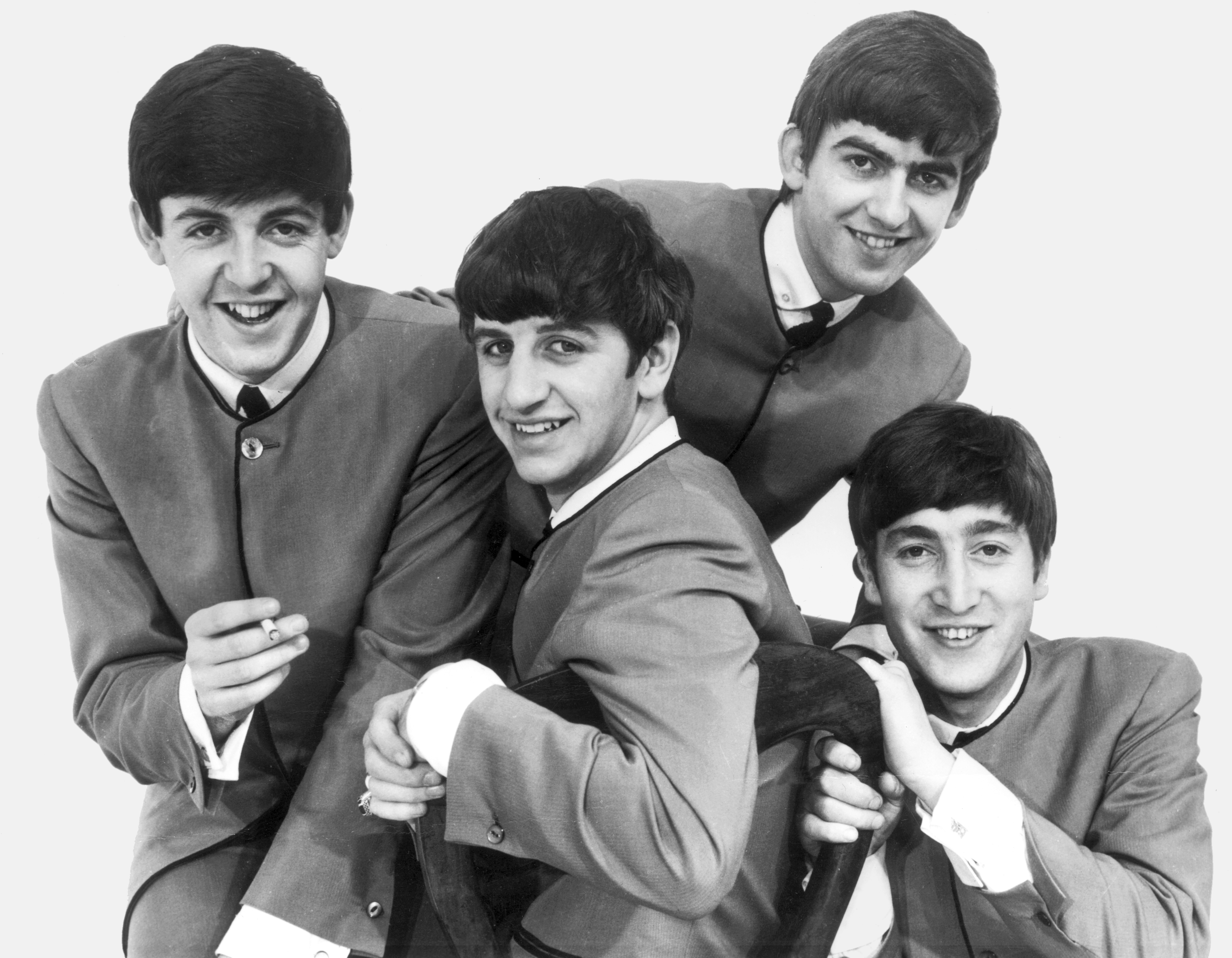
The Beatles

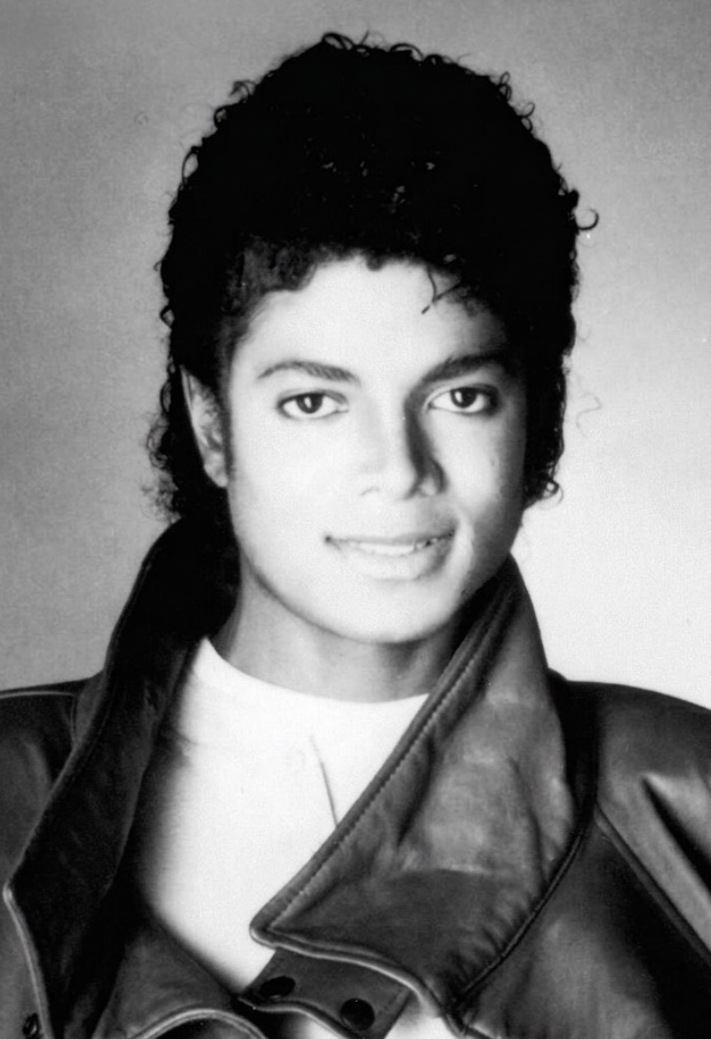
Michael Jackson

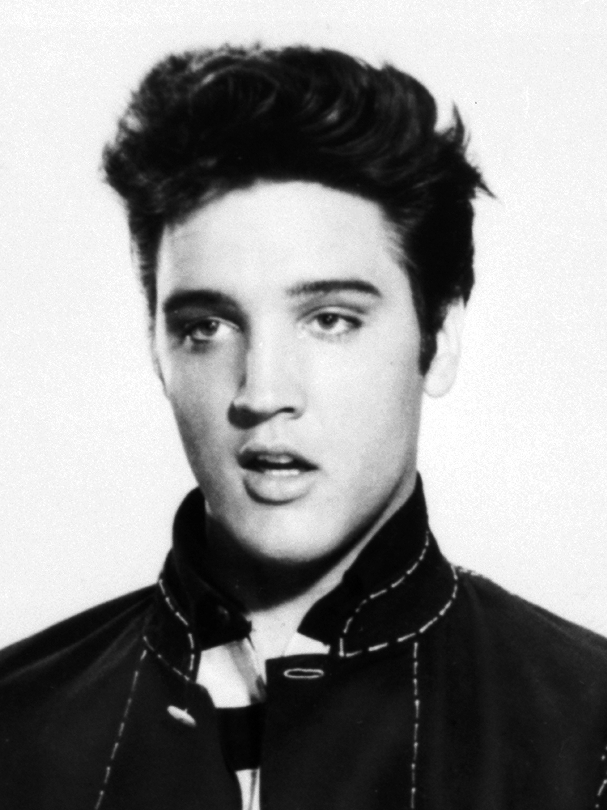
Elvis Presley

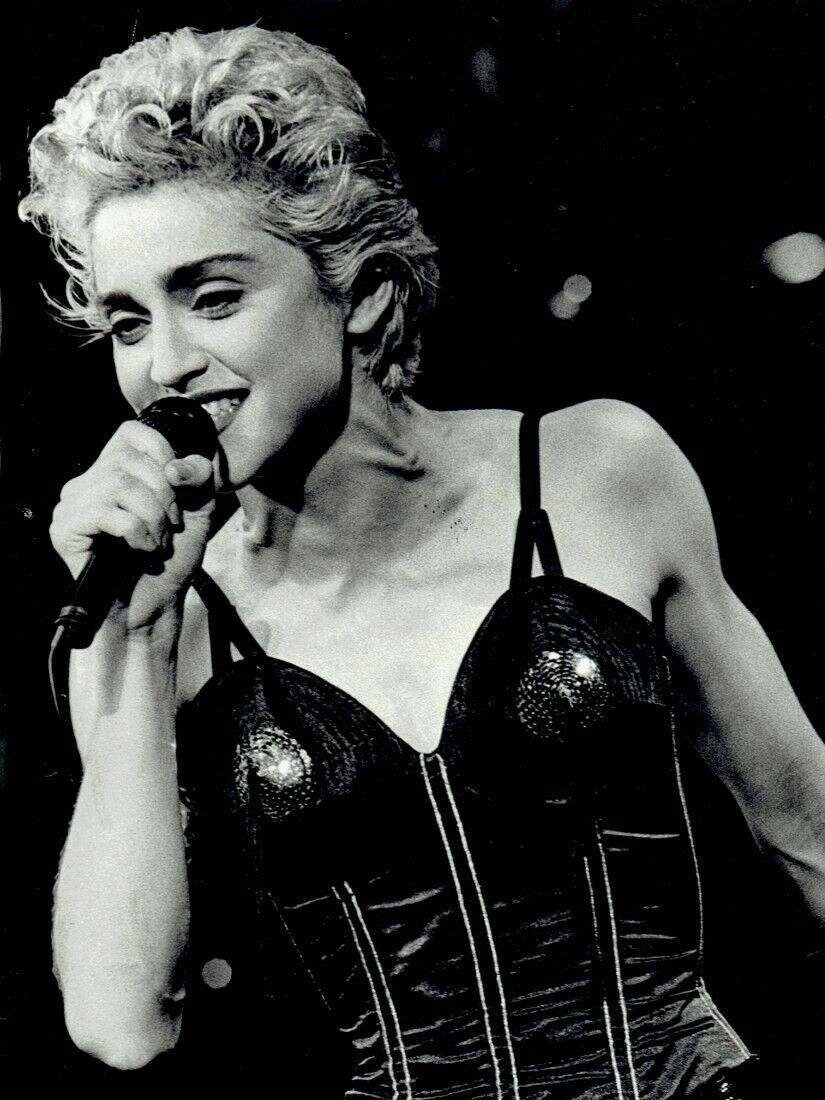
Madonna

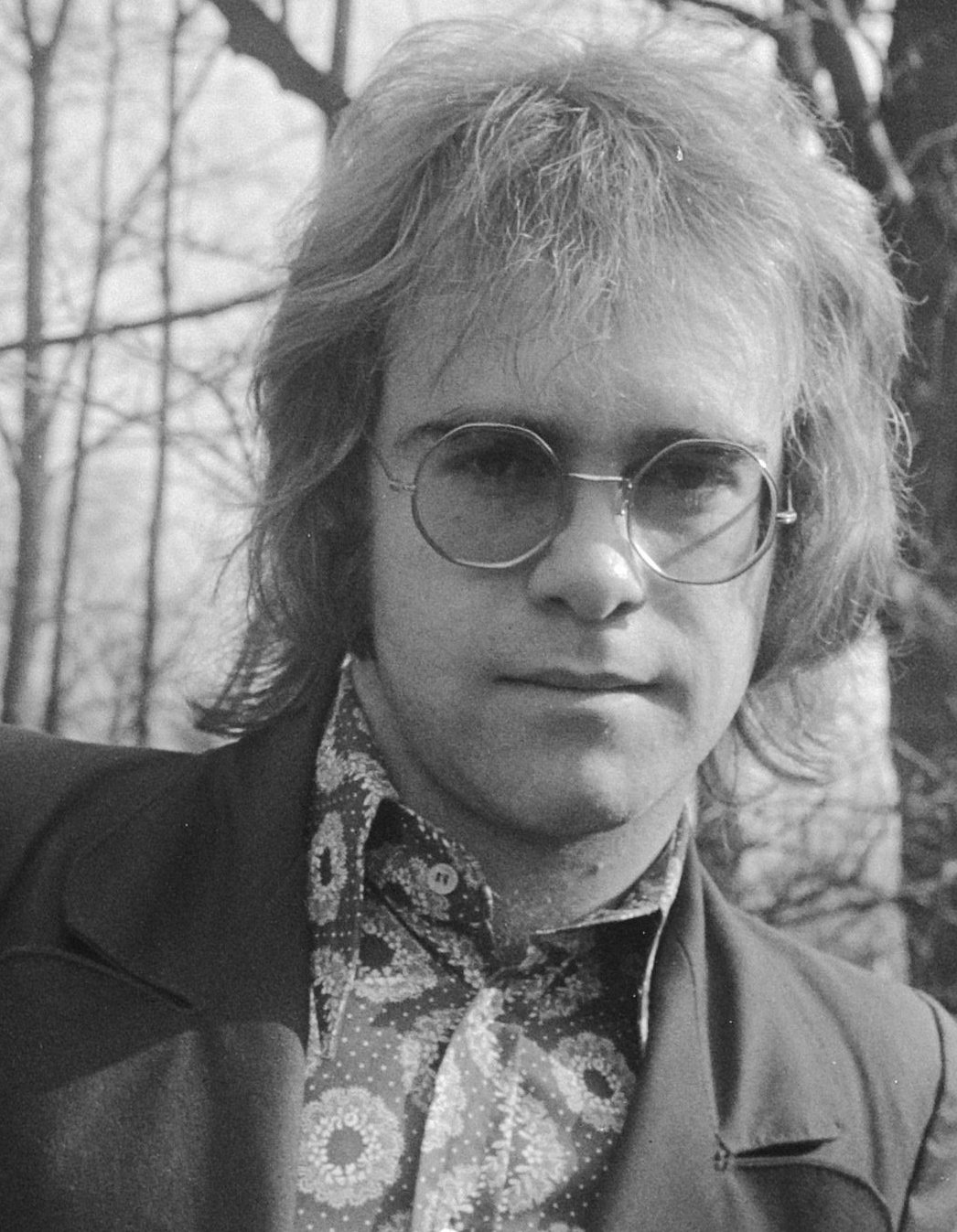
Elton John

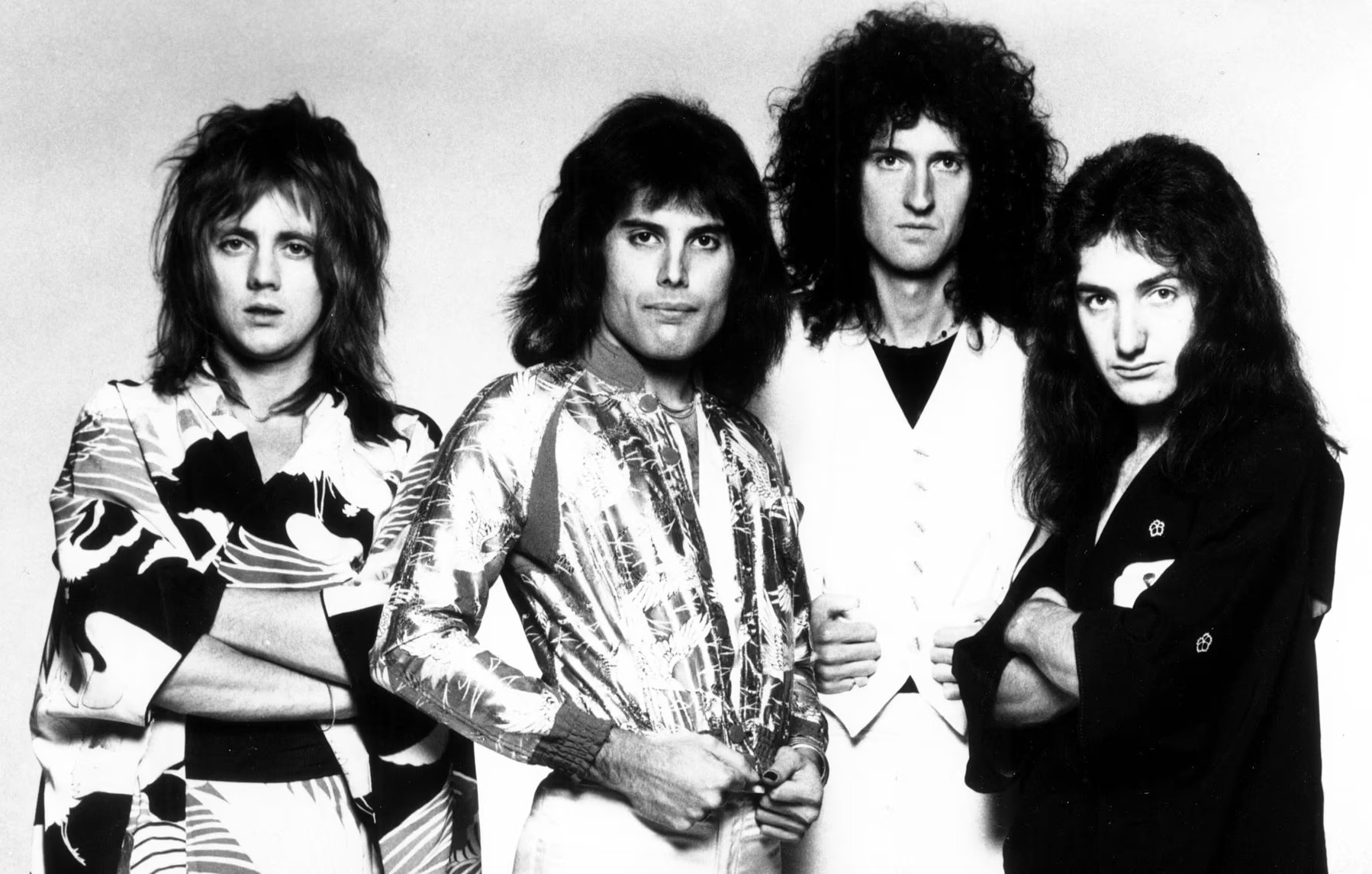
Queen

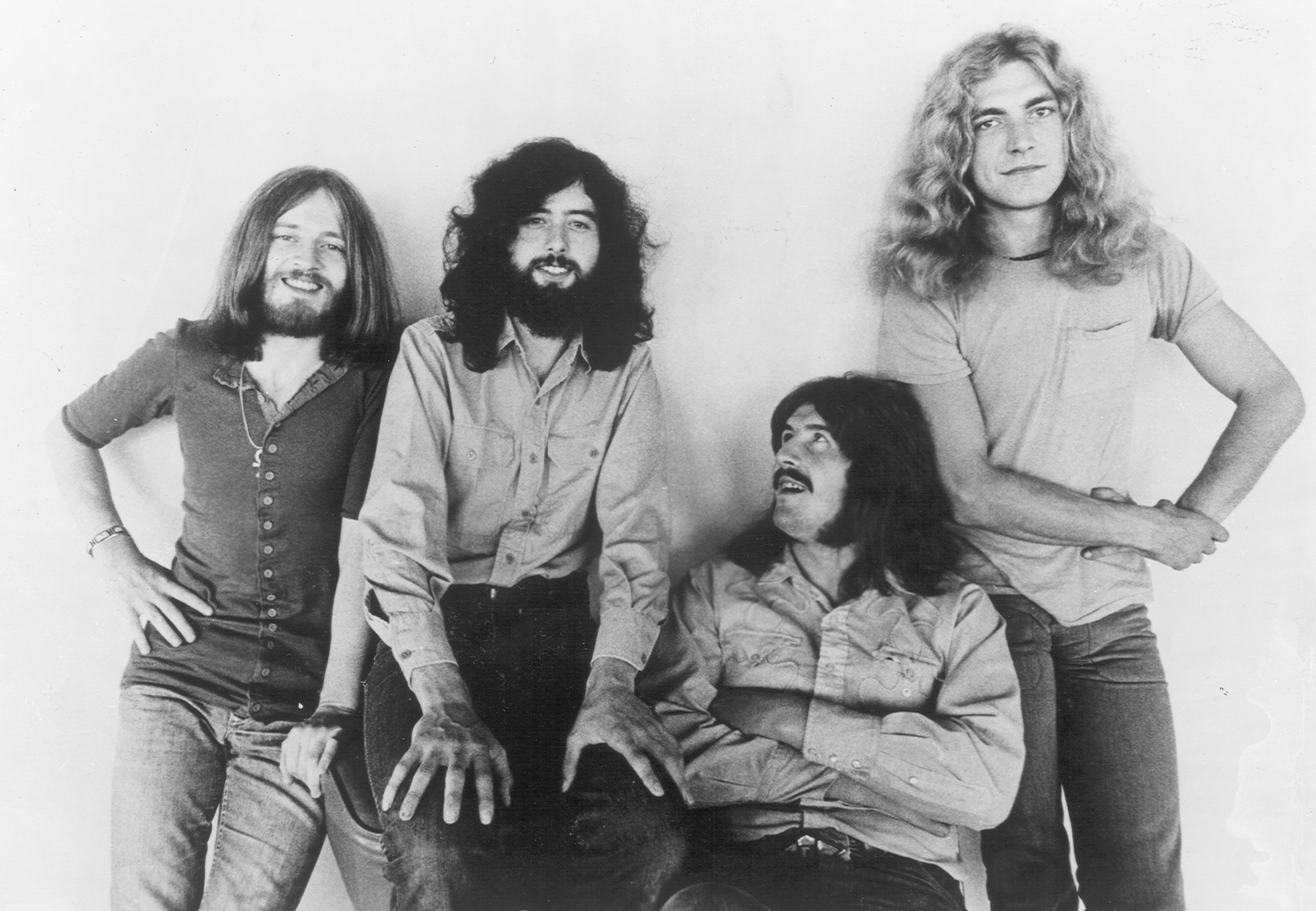
Led Zeppelin

Artist	Country	Period active	Release-year of first charted record	Genre	Total certified units (from available markets) (Note: Certification systems have been established periodically throughout the past half century; thus, certification databases are not able to cover all sales. Some (or all) records released and sold prior to a certification system's establishment year may not be found within the available searchable certification databases. Year of establishment (from largest market to smallest based on Retail Value each market generates respectively): United States: 1958; Japan: 1989; Germany: 1975; United Kingdom: 1973; France: 1973; Canada: 1975; Australia: 1997 (online certification-database has begun since 1997. Certifications; however, existed in Australia since the 1970s); Brazil: 1990; Netherlands: 1978; Italy: 2009 (online certification-database covers certifications issued since 2009. Certifications; however, have existed in Italy since the 1980s); Spain: 1979; Sweden: 1987; Norway: 1993; Denmark: 2001 (online certifications for Denmark start from 2001. Certifications; however, existed in Denmark since the early 1990s); Switzerland: 1989; Mexico: 1999; Argentina: 1980; Belgium: 1995; Austria: 1990; Poland: 1995; Finland: 1971; Ireland: 2005; New Zealand: July 1978; Portugal:(online certification-database covers certifications issued since 2004. Certifications; however, have existed in Portugal since the 1980s); Certified sales might sometimes be larger than actual sales, if stores order more albums than they are able to sell, due to certifications generally being determined by shipments and not actual sales. Often, however, actual sales are larger than certified sales, since record labels must pay a fee to obtain certifications. Record companies often apply for certifications only when a record reaches a multiple-certification level, meaning certifications might not be visible in the databases for more than a short period of time after an album reached a certification level. As global music sales declined in the 2000s mostly due to CD burning and downloading from unauthorized sites, certification bodies opted to reduce their certification levels. See the changes in Certification-award-levels in the following markets: United States (Note, U.S. certification-award-levels for singles before 1989 were: 1,000,000 for Gold and 2,000,000 for Platinum. Also, U.S. certification-awards for Shortform albums before September 1996 were: 250,000 for Gold and 500,000 for Platinum); Japan; Germany (Note, German certification-award-levels for singles before 1988 were: 500,000 for Gold and 1,000,000 for Platinum.); United Kingdom; France; Canada (Canadian certification-award-levels for singles before February 1982 were: 75,000 for Gold and 150,000 for Platinum); Brazil; Netherlands; Italy; Spain; Sweden; Norway; Denmark; Switzerland; Mexico; Argentina; Belgium; Austria: Poland; Finland; New Zealand: (NZ certification-levels for singles before 1989 were: 10,000 for Gold, 20,000 for Platinum)(NZ certification-levels for singles before June 2007 were: 5,000 for Gold, 10,000 for Platinum) (The levels for singles were adjusted again on June 17, 2016 from previous 7,500 for Gold, 15,000 for Platinum, to 15,000 for Gold, 30,000 for Platinum); Portugal:)	Claimed sales
The Beatles	United Kingdom	1960–1970	1962	Rock / pop	295.9 million: US: 217.25 million; JPN: 4.95 million; GER: 8 million; UK: 35.155 million; FRA: 4.09 million; CAN: 14.455 million; AUS: 3.06 million; BRA: 670,000; NLD: 345,000; ITA: 640,000; SPA: 1.785 million; SWE: 485,000; NOR: 200,000; DEN: 610,000; SWI: 350,000; ARG: 1.926 million; BEL: 440,000; AUT: 500,000; POL: 175,000; FIN: 118,048; NZ: 660,000; POR: 135,000	600 million 500 million
Michael Jackson	United States	1964–2009	1971	R&B / pop	308.2 million: US: 178.3 million; JPN: 4.65 million; GER: 15.825 million; UK: 51.38 million; FRA: 11.7 million; CAN: 10.35 million; AUS: 7.72 million; BRA: 460,000; NLD: 2.2 million; ITA: 2.015 million; SPA: 2.995 million; SWE: 1.45 million; NOR: 275,000; DEN: 3.469 million; SWI: 1.01 million; MEX: 8.735 million; ARG: 664,000; BEL: 695,000; AUT: 1.297 million; POL: 530,000; FIN: 384,127; NZ: 2.325 million; POR: 210,000	500 million 400 million
Elvis Presley	United States	1953–1977	1956	Rock / pop / country / gospel	235.4 million: US: 199.65 million; JPN: 300,000; GER: 1.8 million; UK: 23.215 million; FRA: 2.59 million; CAN: 2.925 million; AUS: 1.867 million; BRA: 125,000; NLD: 555,000; ITA: 285,000; SPA: 300,000; SWE: 380,000; NOR: 130,000; DEN: 210,000; SWI: 185,000; MEX: 105,000; ARG: 110,000; BEL: 115,000; AUT: 205,000; FIN: 213,945; NZ: 117,500; POR: 100,000	500 million
Madonna	United States	1979–present	1982	Pop	193.4 million: US: 91.675 million; JPN: 6.45 million; GER: 12.95 million; UK: 34.10 million; FRA: 13.105 million; CAN: 6.03 million; AUS: 5.737 million; BRA: 4.380 million; NLD: 1.745 million; ITA: 3.700 million; SPA: 3.280 million; SWE: 1.07 million; NOR: 280,000; DEN: 947,000; SWI: 1.28 million; MEX: 550,000; ARG: 2.102 million; BEL: 1.055 million; AUT: 645,000; POL: 690,000; FIN: 665,267; NZ: 820,000; POR: 152,000	400 million 300 million
Elton John	United Kingdom	1962–present	1970	Pop / rock	216.8 million: US: 140.55 million; JPN: 1.1 million; GER: 8.1 million; UK: 40.605 million; FRA: 5.158 million; CAN: 6.295 million; AUS: 4.697 million; BRA: 855,000; NLD: 975,000; ITA: 300,000; SPA: 1.38 million; SWE: 980,000; NOR: 400,000; DEN: 870,000; SWI: 1.333 million; MEX: 450,000; ARG: 128,000; BEL: 870,000; AUT: 915,000; POL: 445,000; FIN: 163,481; NZ: 420,000	300 million 250 million
Queen	United Kingdom	1971–present	1973	Rock / pop	201.1 million: US: 108.7 million; JPN: 3.8 million; GER: 12.525 million; UK: 49.21 million; FRA: 5.22 million; CAN: 2.47 million; AUS: 3.792 million; BRA: 1.27 million; NLD: 1.99 million; ITA: 1.87 million; SPA: 3.3 million; SWE: 190,000; NOR: 150,000; DEN: 1.17 million; SWI: 1.256 million; ARG: 1.08 million; BEL: 190,000; AUT: 900,000; POL: 940,000; FIN: 366,152; NZ: 515,000; POR: 222,000	300 million 250 million
Led Zeppelin	United Kingdom	1968–1980	1969	Rock	143.1 million: US: 115.1 million; JPN: 400,000; GER: 3.775 million; UK: 11.43 million; FRA: 2.31 million; CAN: 4.71 million; AUS: 2.8 million; BRA: 970,000; ITA: 535,000; SPA: 450,000; SWI: 211,000; ARG: 360,000; POL: 120,000	300 million 200 million
Rihanna	Barbados	2003–present	2005	R&B / pop	411.2 million: US: 288.55 million; JPN: 1.4 million; GER: 12.425 million; UK: 61.7 million; FRA: 2.316 million; CAN: 5.52 million; AUS: 10.2 million; BRA: 15.512 million; ITA: 2.075 million; SPA: 1.800 million; SWE: 2.6 million; DEN: 2.796 million; SWI: 860,000; MEX: 860,000; BEL: 800,000; AUT: 165,000; POL: 820,000; IRE: 240,000; NZ: 712,500; POR: 127,500	250 million 230 million
Pink Floyd	United Kingdom	1965–1996, 2005, 2012–2014	1967	Rock	124.8 million: US: 78 million; JPN: 100,000; GER: 7.5 million; UK: 15.11 million; FRA: 6.26 million; CAN: 6.79 million; AUS: 3.242 million; BRA: 515,000; NLD: 435,000; ITA: 1.81 million; SPA: 625,000; SWE: 220,000; NOR: 165,000; DEN: 290,000; SWI: 390,000; MEX: 210,000; ARG: 582,000; BEL: 165,000; AUT: 460,000; POL: 770,000; NZ: 787,500; POR: 194,500	250 million 200 million

=== Over 200 million ===
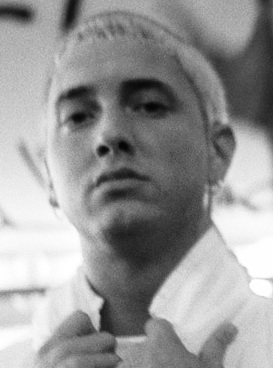
Eminem

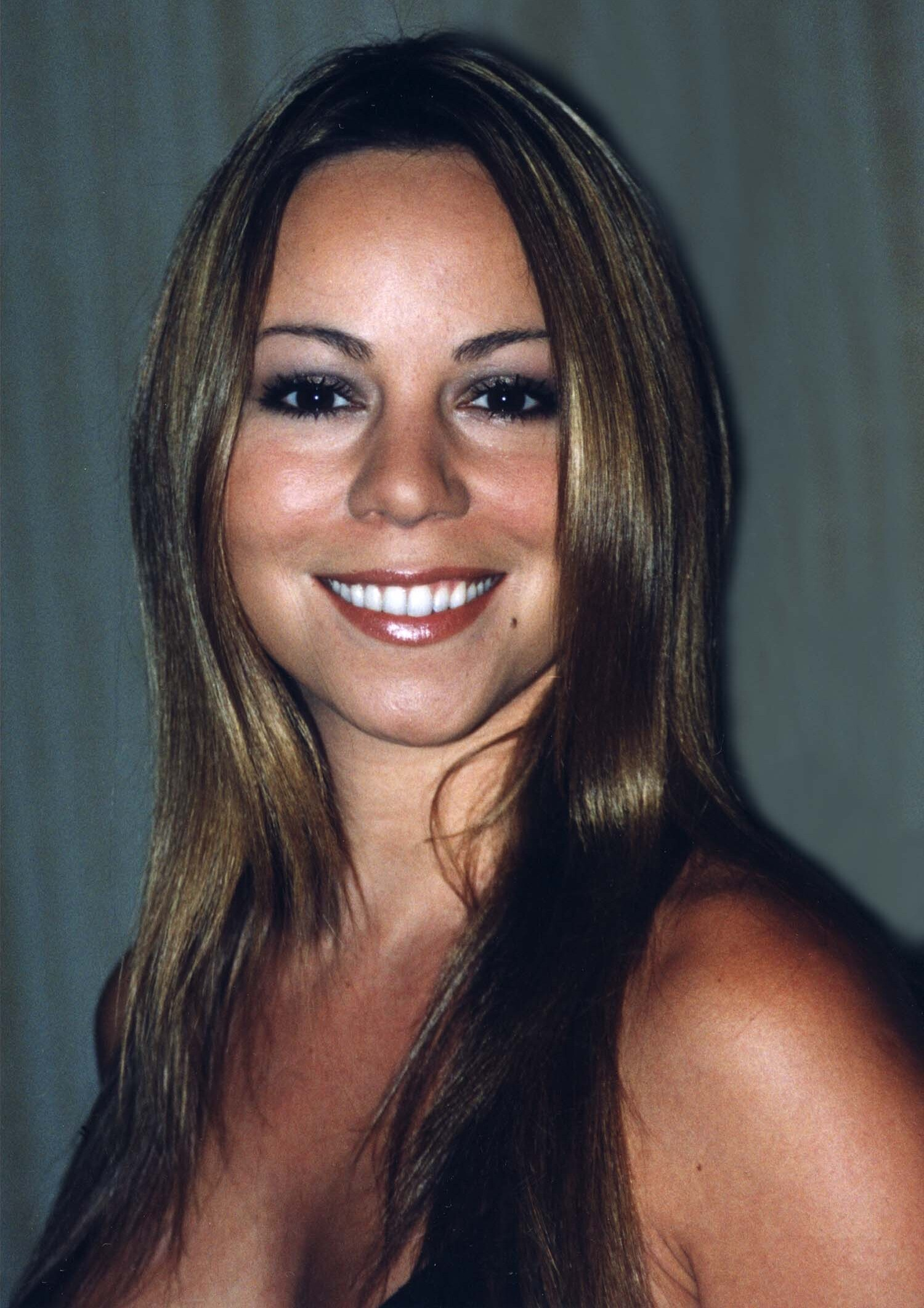
Mariah Carey

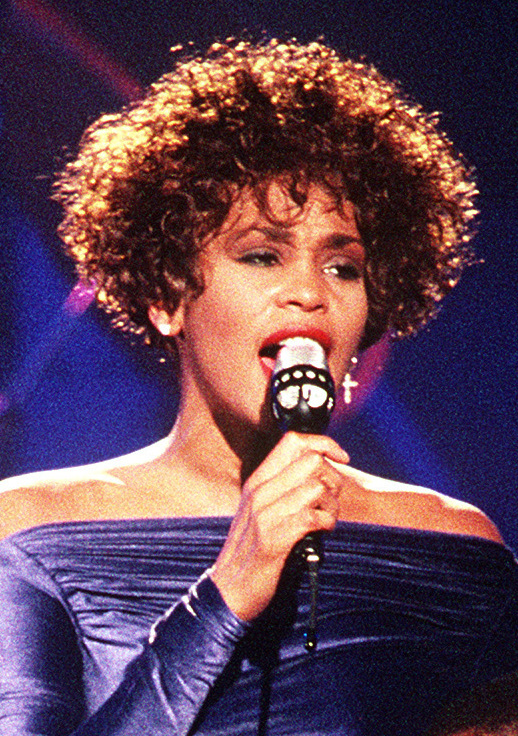
Whitney Houston

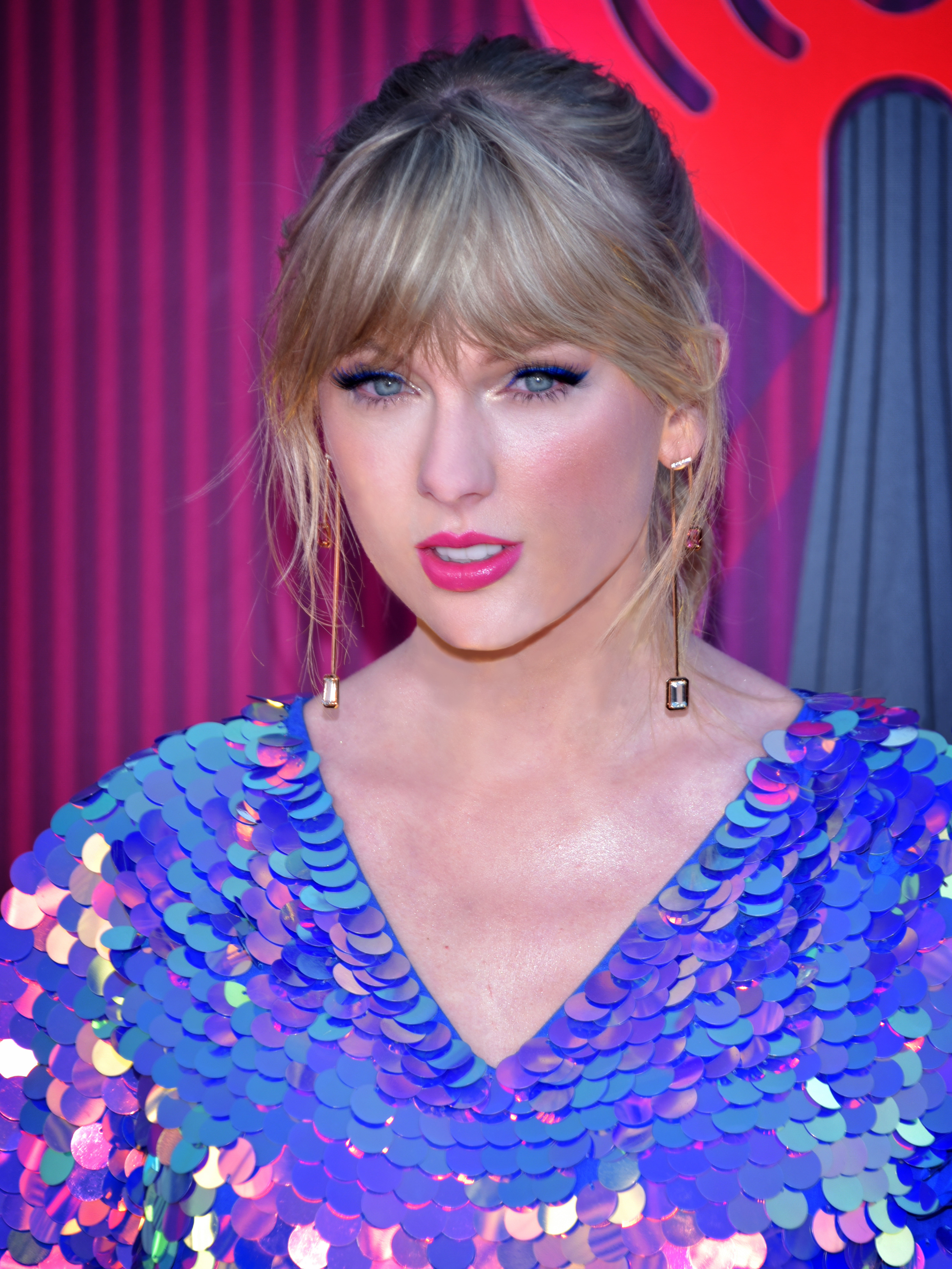
Taylor Swift

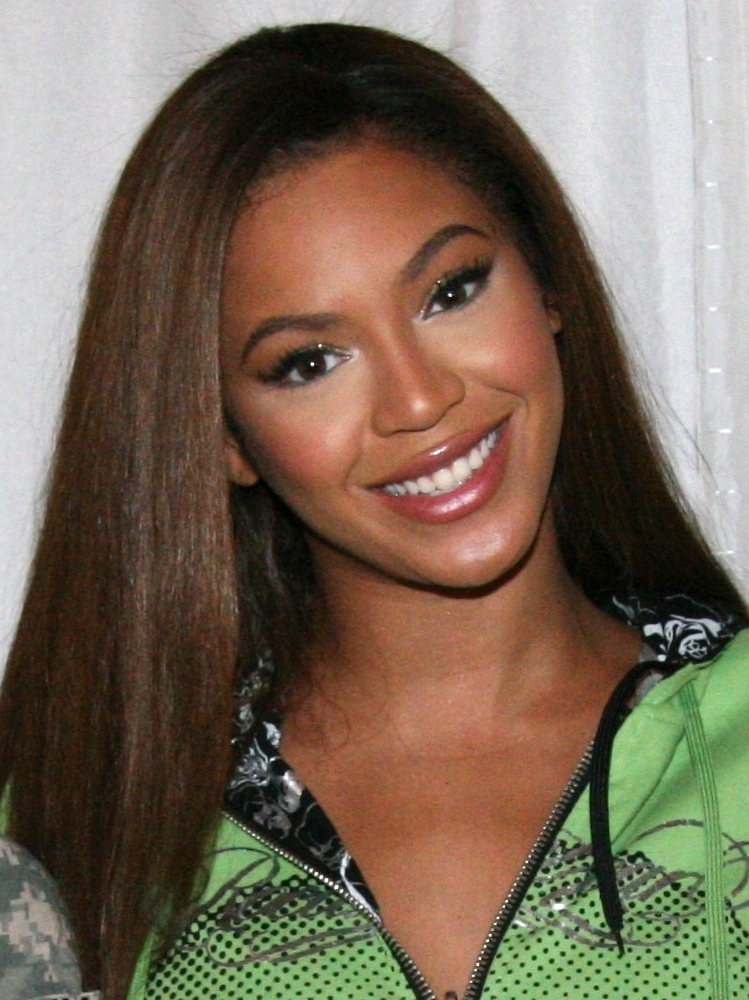
Beyoncé

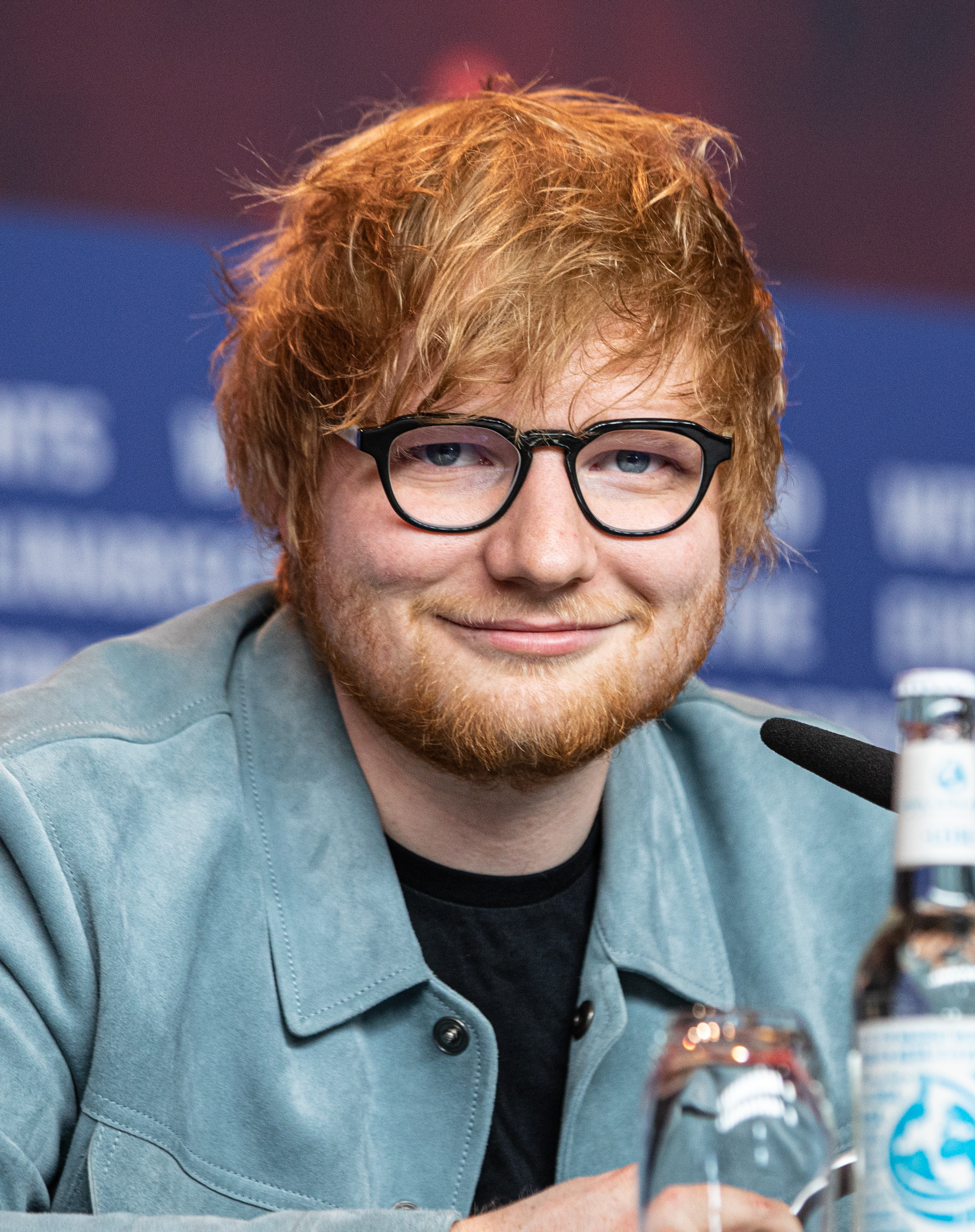
Ed Sheeran

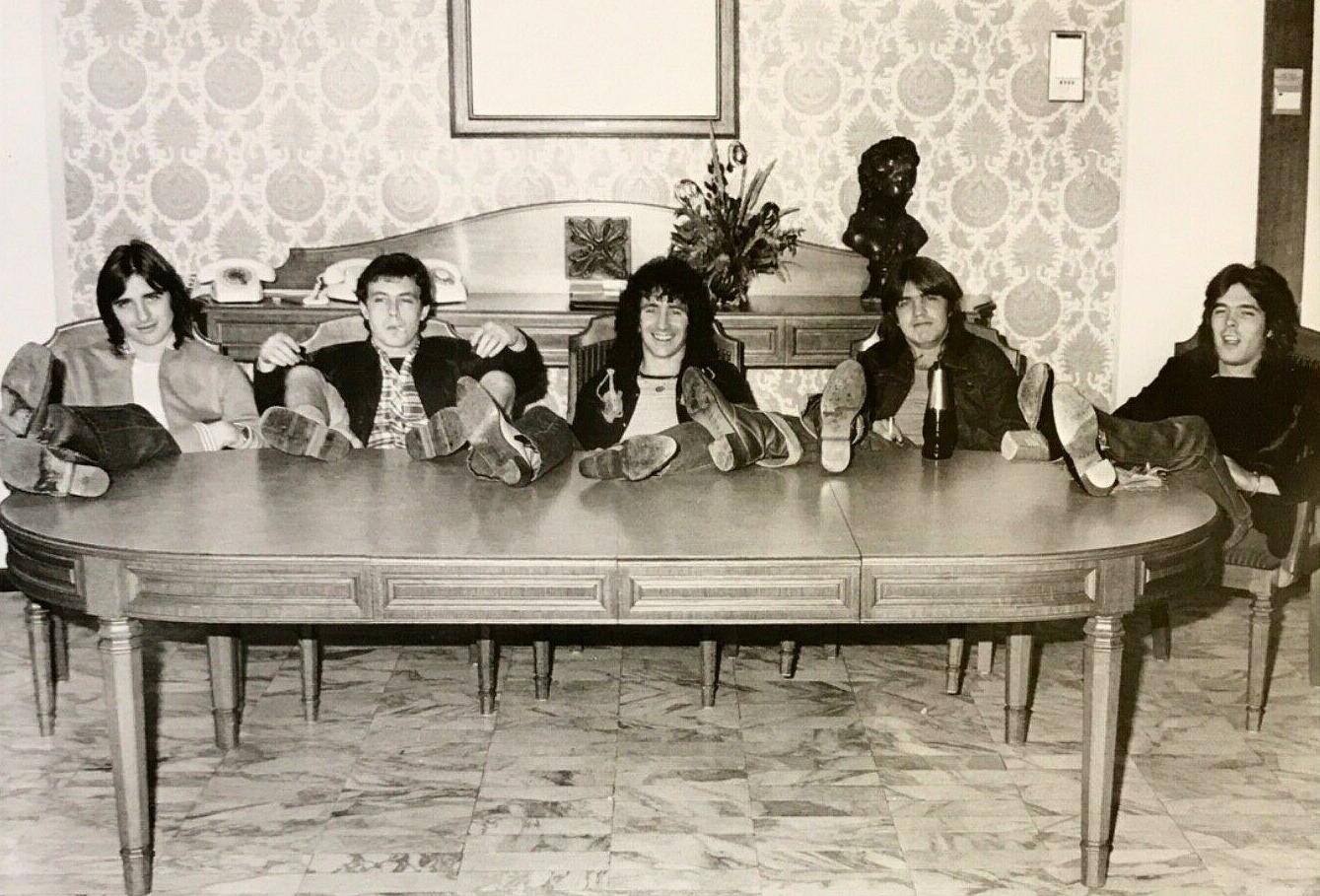
AC/DC

Artist	Country	Period active	Release-year of first charted record	Genre	Total certified units (from available markets)	Claimed sales
Eminem	United States	1996–present	1999	Hip-hop	345.8 million: US: 242.7 million; JPN: 2.9 million; GER: 12.625 million; UK: 54.425 million; FRA: 3.665 million; CAN: 4.57 million; AUS: 10.307 million; BRA: 4.4 million; NLD: 250,000; ITA: 1.35 million; SPA: 1.18 million; SWE: 970,000; NOR: 345,000; DEN: 2.606 million; SWI: 790,000; MEX: 365,000; BEL: 515,000; AUT: 377,500; POL: 310,000; FIN: 130,351; IRE: 270,000; NZ: 712,500; POR: 105,000	220 million
Mariah Carey	United States	1988–present	1990	R&B / pop	243.2 million: US: 175.8 million; JPN: 14.5 million; GER: 5.4 million; UK: 21.9 million; FRA: 5.170 million; CAN: 5.570 million; AUS: 6.170 million; BRA: 2.155 million; NLD: 1.425 million; ITA: 700,000; SPA: 1.320 million; SWE: 425,000; NOR: 575,000; DEN: 740,000; SWI: 515,000; BEL: 325,000; AUT: 200,000; POL: 100,000; NZ: 662,500	220 million
Whitney Houston	United States	1977–2012	1984	R&B / pop / gospel	186.9 million: US: 125.875 million; JPN: 5.710 million; GER: 7 million; UK: 26.045 million; FRA: 4.375 million; CAN: 3.75 million; AUS: 2.52 million; BRA: 1.065 million; NLD: 780,000; ITA: 2.055 million; SPA: 1.26 million; SWE: 1.035 million; NOR: 480,000; DEN: 1.08 million; SWI: 915,000; MEX: 150,000; ARG: 240,000; BEL: 480,000; AUT: 565,000; POL: 240,000; FIN: 247,222; NZ: 835,000	220 million
Taylor Swift	United States	2003–present	2006	Pop / country / folk	348.4 million: US: 244 million; JPN: 3.3 million; GER: 7.425 million; UK: 66.3 million; FRA: 649,000; CAN: 7.631 million; AUS: 31.205 million; BRA: 12.47 million; ITA: 2.095 million; SPA: 2.35 million; SWE: 320,000; NOR: 1.2 million; DEN: 2.505 million; MEX: 3.13 million; BEL: 320,000; AUT: 152,000; POL: 830,000; NZ: 5.782 million; POR: 424,000	200 million 170 million
Beyoncé	United States	1997–present	2002	R&B / pop	315.3 million: US: 226.08 million; JPN: 1.7 million; GER: 5.51 million; UK: 42.43 million; FRA: 2.110 million; CAN: 8.53 million; AUS: 10.04 million; BRA: 8.74 million; NLD: 140,000; ITA: 1.42 million; SPA: 2.010 million; SWE: 630,000; NOR: 240,000; DEN: 1.8 million; SWI: 235,000; MEX: 320,000; BEL: 270,000; POL: 460,000; NZ: 2.65 million	200 million 160 million
Ed Sheeran	United Kingdom	2004–present	2011	Pop	288 million: US: 129 million; JPN: 350,000; GER: 13.35 million; UK: 92.12 million; FRA: 4.156 million; CAN: 12.64 million; AUS: 13.865 million; BRA: 720,000; NLD: 370,000; ITA: 4.855 million; SPA: 1.34 million; SWE: 1.68 million; NOR: 395,000; DEN: 6.145 million; SWI: 675,000; MEX: 270,000; BEL: 860,000; AUT: 865,000; POL: 2.32 million; NZ: 1.785 million; POR: 330,000	200 million
AC/DC	Australia	1973–present	1975	Rock	188.8 million: US: 128.2 million; GER: 14,05 million; UK: 10.565 million; FRA: 4.38 million; CAN: 9.28 million; AUS: 8.65 million; BRA: 1 million; ITA: 1.72 million; SPA: 2.265 million; SWE: 350,000; DEN: 780,000; SWI: 914,000; MEX: 1.59 million; ARG: 594,000; BEL: 100,000; AUT: 395,000; POL: 115,000; FIN: 321,169; NZ: 1,33 million; POR: 116,500	200 million
Eagles	United States	1971–1980, 1994–present	1972	Rock	153.7 million: US: 127.9 million; JPN: 600,000; GER: 925,000; UK: 11.585 million; FRA: 2.04 million; CAN: 4.2 million; AUS: 4.025 million; NLD: 540,000; ITA: 200,000; SPA: 620,000; SWE: 140,000; DEN: 240,000; SWI: 290,000; FIN: 124,749; NZ: 367,500	200 million
Celine Dion	Canada	1981–present	1981	Pop / world	152 million: US: 67.05 million; JPN: 7.15 million; GER: 8.65 million; UK: 21.315 million; FRA: 16.068 million; CAN: 15.005 million; AUS: 3.827 million; BRA: 505,000; NLD: 2.18 million; ITA: 100,000; SPA: 1.03 million; SWE: 1.105 million; NOR: 860,000; DEN: 845,000; SWI: 1.685 million; ARG: 340,000; BEL: 2.16 million; AUT: 440,000; POL: 700,000; FIN: 356,183; NZ: 445,000	200 million
The Rolling Stones	United Kingdom	1962–present	1963	Rock / blues	104.1 million: US: 74.75 million; JPN: 950,000; GER: 3.8 million; UK: 12.93 million; FRA: 3.38 million; CAN: 3.025 million; AUS: 697,500; BRA: 275.000; NLD: 610,000; ITA: 375,000; SPA: 990,000; SWE: 310,000; NOR: 100,000; DEN: 170,000; SWI: 238,000; ARG: 718,000; BEL: 220,000; AUT: 300,000; POL: 140,000; NZ: 190,000	200 million

=== Over 120 million ===
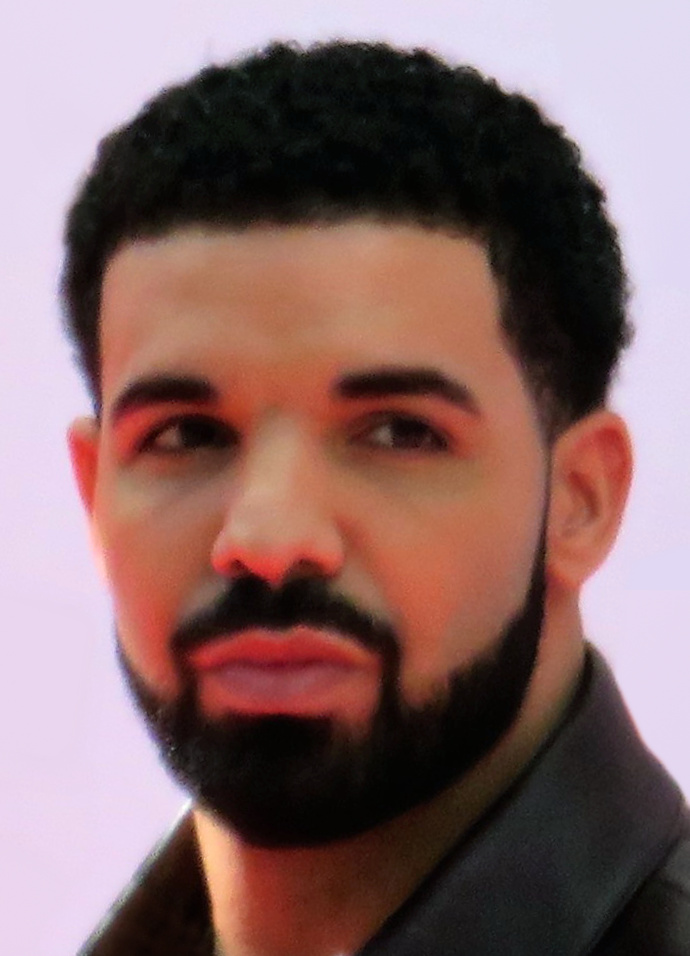
Drake

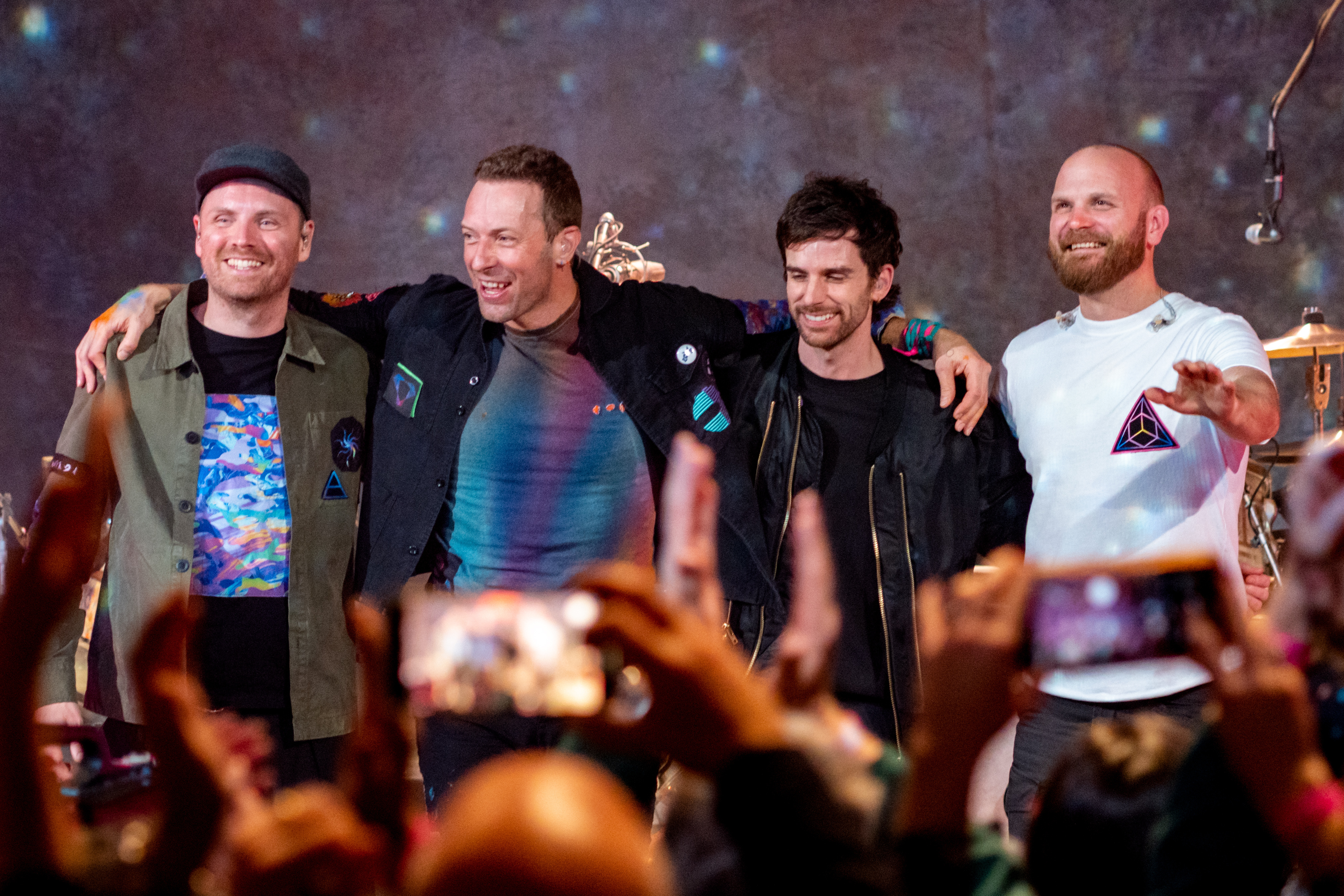
Coldplay

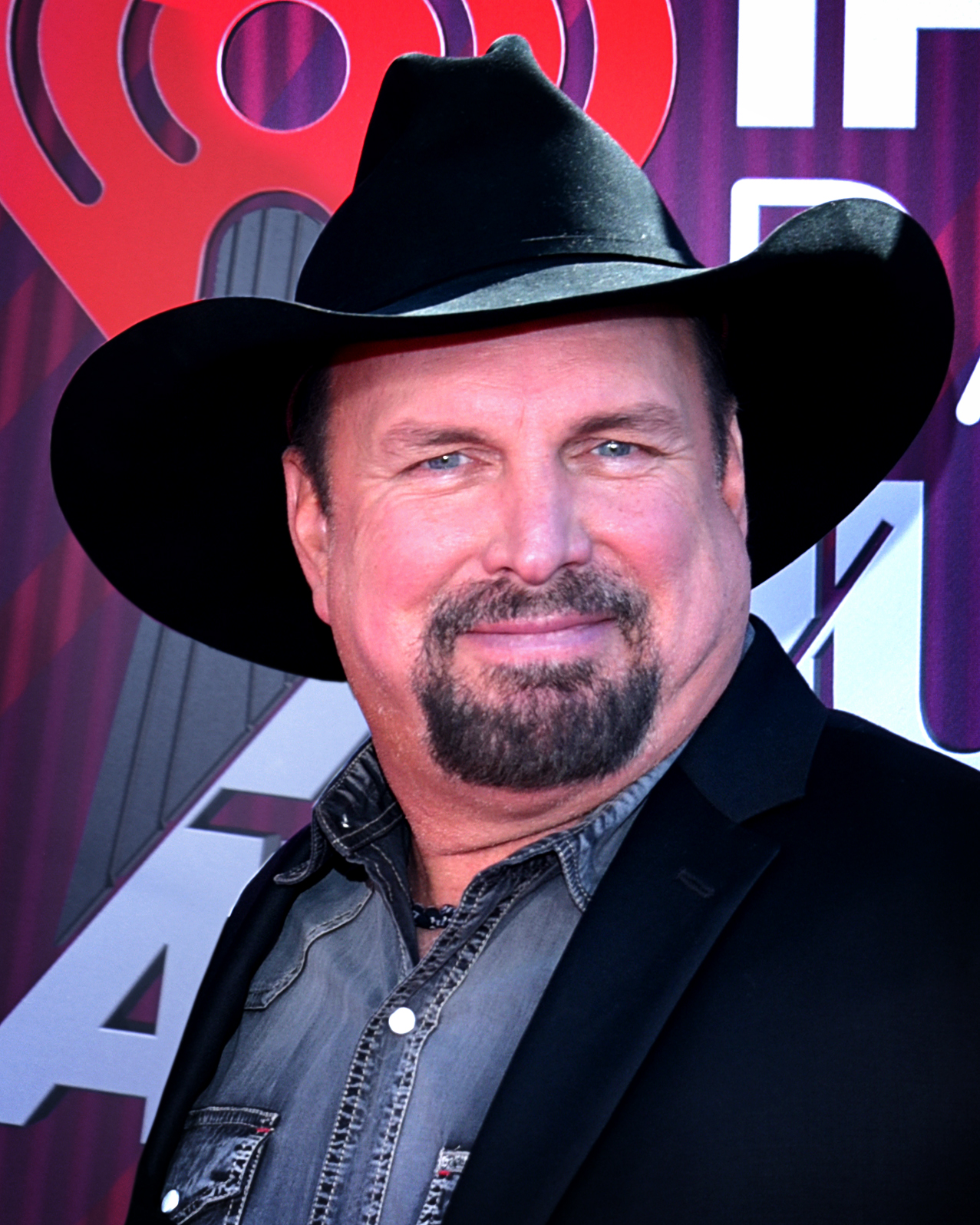
Garth Brooks

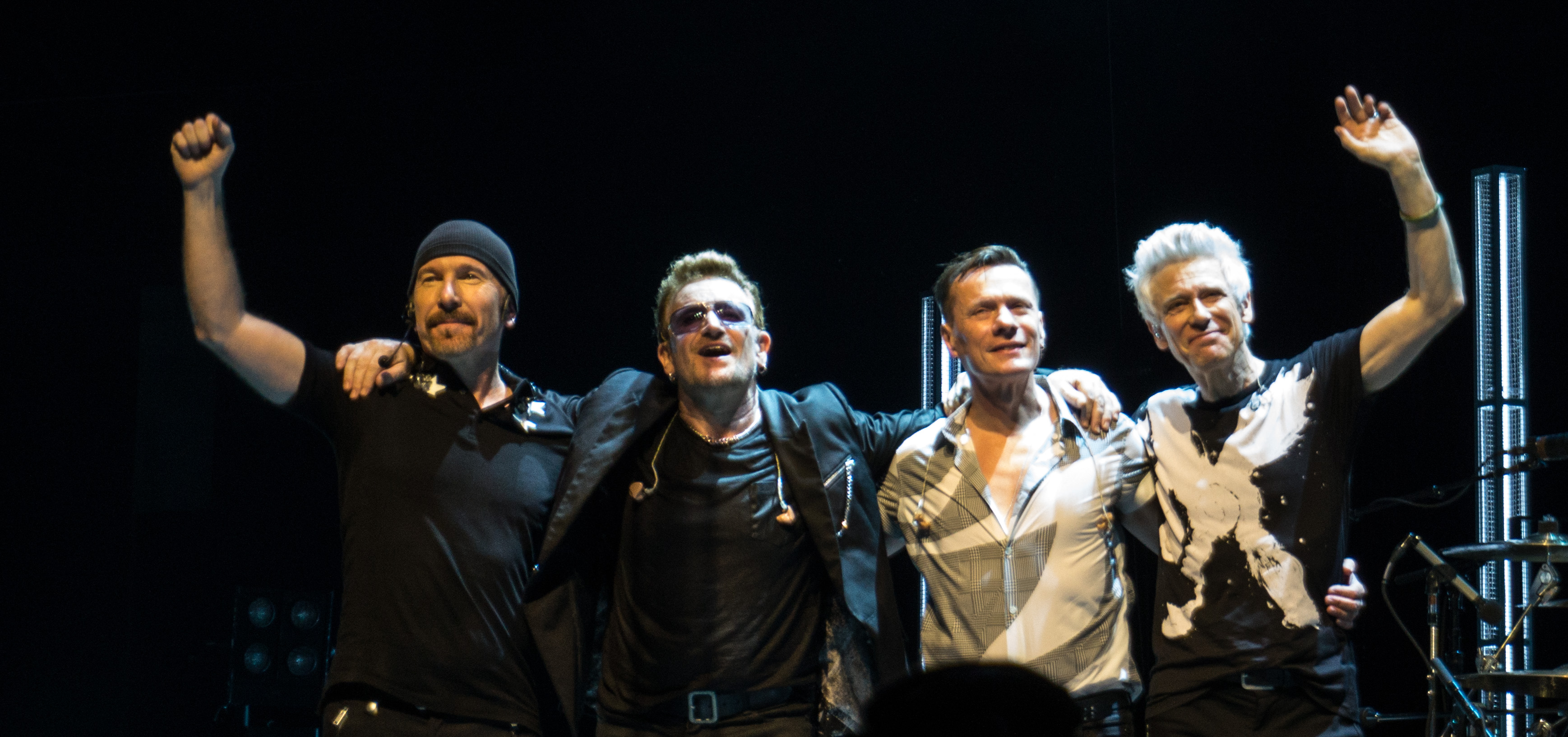
U2

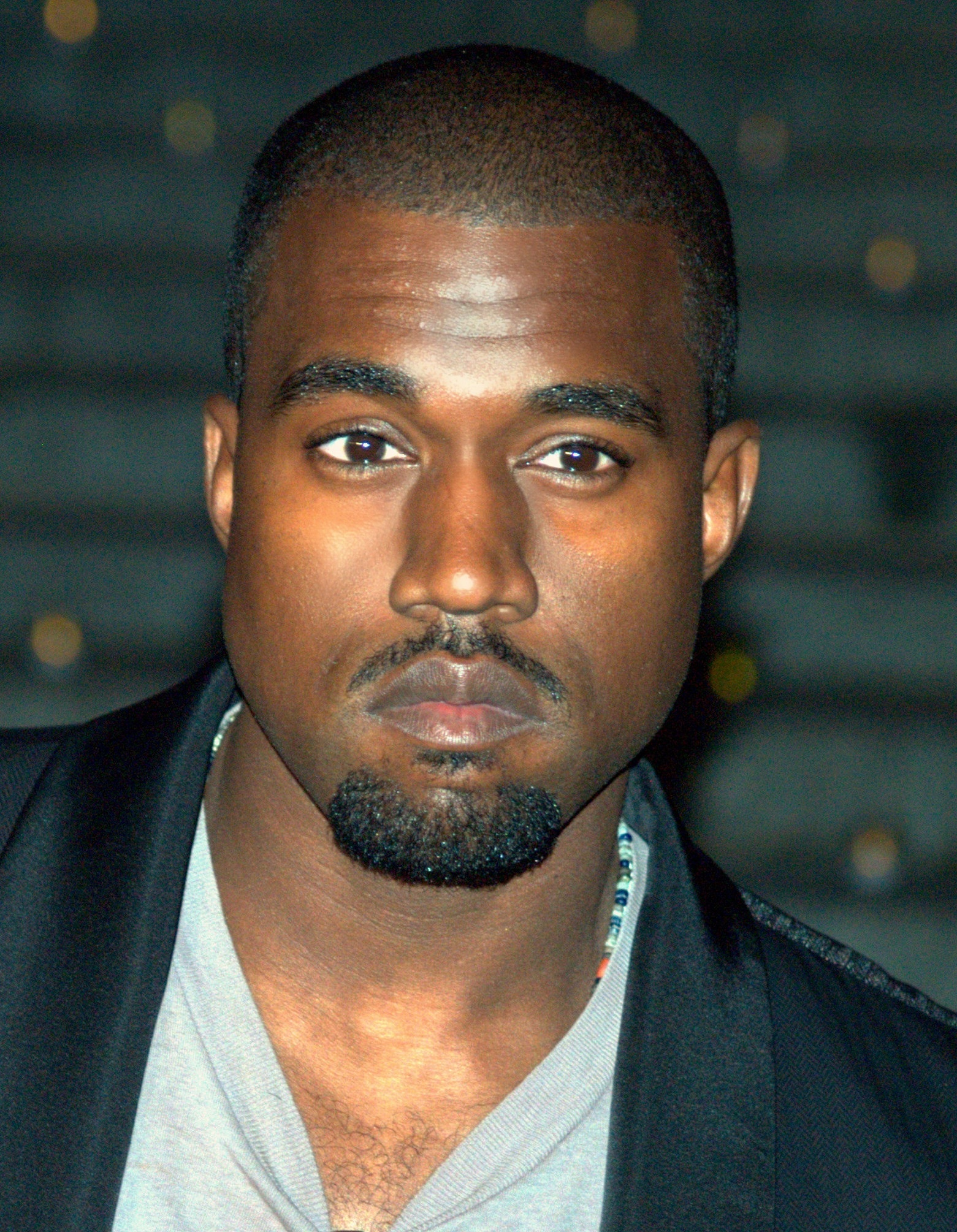
Kanye West

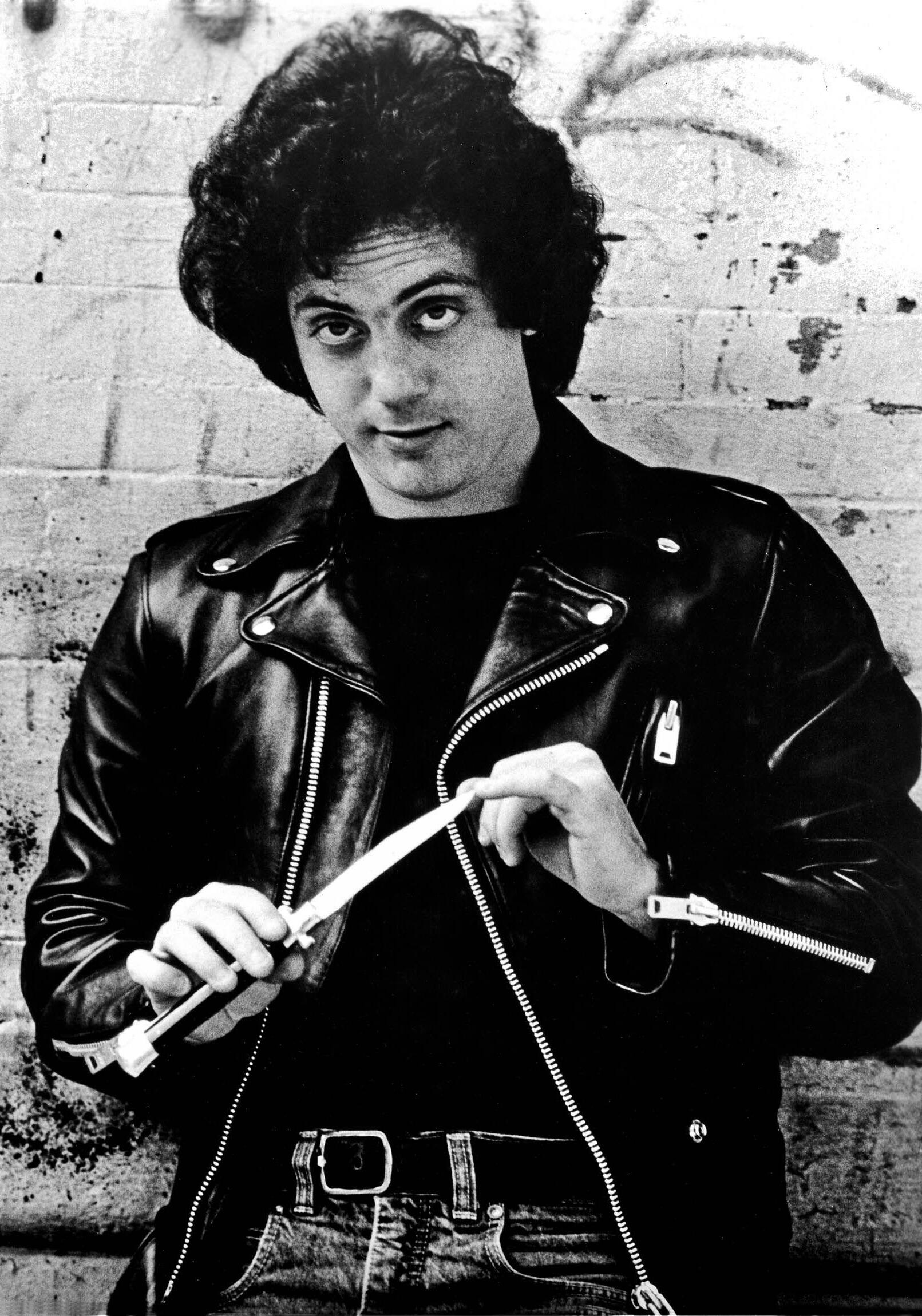
Billy Joel

Katy Perry

Artist	Country	Period active	Release-year of first charted record	Genre	Total certified units (from available markets)	Claimed sales
Drake	Canada	2001–present	2009	Hip-hop / R&B / pop	556.8 million: US: 432.78 million; GER: 2.65 million; UK: 72.4 million; FRA: 3.949 million; CAN: 9.72 million; AUS: 18.83 million; BRA: 6.53 million; ITA: 1.885 million; SPA: 1.31 million; SWE: 1.31 million; DEN: 2.96 million; MEX: 1.2 million; BEL: 315,000; AUT: 127,500; POL: 390,000; NZ: 562,500; POR: 350,000	170 million
Coldplay	United Kingdom	1997–present	1999	Rock / pop	180.6 million: US: 64.6 million; JPN: 750,000; GER: 10.325 million; UK: 57.405 million; FRA: 4.728 million; KOR: 2.5 million; CAN: 4.29 million; AUS: 8.8 million; BRA: 1.67 million; NLD: 630,000; ITA: 5.005 million; SPA: 3.64 million; SWE: 1.19 million; NOR: 400,000; DEN: 3.272 million; SWI: 635,000; MEX: 3.38 million; ARG: 508,000; BEL: 710,000; AUT: 517,500; POL: 860,000; IRE: 255,000; NZ: 2.925 million; POR: 879,000; SGP: 115,000	170 million
Garth Brooks	United States	1989–present	1989	Country	170.3 million: US: 163.4 million; UK: 520,000; CAN: 5.73 million; AUS: 595,000; IRE: 120,000	170 million
U2	Ireland	1976–present	1980	Rock	123.9 million: US: 54.9 million; JPN: 1.45 million; GER: 6.9 million; UK: 27.295 million; FRA: 5.565 million; CAN: 6.885 million; AUS: 4.728 million; NZ: 1.59 million; BRA: 2.8 million; NLD: 1.24 million; ITA: 1.08 million; SPA: 2.715 million; SWE: 515,000; NOR: 150,000; DEN: 838,000; SWI: 771,000; MEX: 835,000; ARG: 966,000; BEL: 770,000; AUT: 522,500; POL: 370,000; FIN: 235,460; IRE: 316,000; POR: 433,000	170 million
Kanye West	United States	1996–present	2003	Hip-hop / pop / gospel	295.3 million: US: 247.55 million; JPN: 200,000; GER: 1.75 million; UK: 38.46 million; FRA: 225,000; CAN: 1.66 million; AUS: 3.22 million; ITA: 540,000; SWE: 300,000; DEN: 1.715 million; NZ: 177,500	160 million
Billy Joel	United States	1964–present	1971	Pop / rock	136 million: US: 116.35 million; JPN: 2 million; GER: 1.25 million; UK: 9.815 million; FRA: 1.025 million; CAN: 3.275 million; AUS: 1.687 million; NLD: 350,000; AUT: 125,000; NZ: 162,500	160 million
Katy Perry	United States	2001–present	2008	Pop	241.73 million: US: 148.96 million; JPN: 400,000; GER: 7.05 million; UK: 32.45 million; FRA: 4.933 million; CAN: 12.96 million; AUS: 13.33 million; BRA: 8.335 million; ITA: 1.27 million; SPA: 850,000; SWE: 580,000; NOR: 2.69 million; DEN: 1.43 million; SWI: 295,000; MEX: 1.53 million; BEL: 150,000; AUT: 662,500; POL: 375,000; NZ: 2.483 million	151 million
Justin Bieber	Canada	2008–present	2009	Pop / R&B	313.4 million: US: 201 million; JPN: 950,000; GER: 6.2 million; UK: 39.945 million; FRA: 2.38 million; CAN: 9.38 million; AUS: 9.24 million; BRA: 13.96 million; ITA: 3.015 million; SPA: 1.4 million; SWE: 2.91 million; NOR: 3.960 million; DEN: 5.545 million; SWI: 175,000; MEX: 8.99 million; BEL: 810,000; AUT: 327,500; POL: 870,000; NZ: 1.275 million; POR: 325,000	150 million
Bruno Mars	United States	2004–present	2010	Pop / R&B	236.7 million: US: 179.5 million; JPN: 1.2 million; GER: 3.8 million; UK: 28.66 million; FRA: 2.25 million; CAN: 7 million; AUS: 6.965 million; BRA: 520,000; NLD: 105,000; ITA: 1.16 million; SPA: 1.26 million; SWE: 440,000; DEN: 1.525 million; SWI: 415,000; MEX: 1.23 million; BEL: 360,000; AUT: 180,000; POL: 170,000; NZ: 712,500; PHL: 330,000; POR: 115,000	150 million
Britney Spears	United States	1998–present	1998	Pop	161.5 million: US: 106.5 million; JPN: 2.5 million; GER: 8.2 million; UK: 21.885 million; FRA: 4.755 million; CAN: 4.22 million; AUS: 3.245 million; BRA: 705,000; NLD: 665,000; ITA: 550,000; SPA: 1.07 million; SWE: 1.01 million; NOR: 205,000; DEN: 1.123 million; SWI: 495,000; MEX: 1.405 million; ARG: 452,000; BEL: 940,000; AUT: 395,000; POL: 320,000; FIN: 143,627; NZ: 835,000; POR: 160,000	150 million
Metallica	United States	1981–present	1983	Metal / rock	155.6 million: US: 112.6 million; JPN: 900,000; GER: 12.175 million; UK: 9.785 million; FRA: 945,000; CAN: 3.885 million; AUS: 6.802 million; NZ: 1.29 million; ITA: 460,000; POL: 1.195 million; BRA: 380,000; NLD: 460,000; SPA: 420,000; SWE: 675,000; NOR: 320,000; DEN: 500,000; SWI: 560,000; MEX: 430,000; ARG: 874,000; BEL: 385,000; AUT: 340,000; FIN: 530,676	150 million
Bruce Springsteen	United States	1972–present	1973	Rock / folk	128.7 million: US: 95.15 million; JPN: 400,000; GER: 4.425 million; UK: 12.41 million; FRA: 2.037 million; CAN: 3.2 million; AUS: 3.537 million; BRA: 100,000; NLD: 740,000; ITA: 740,000; SPA: 2 million; SWE: 810,000; NOR: 340,000; DEN: 620,000; SWI: 535,000; MEX: 280,000; BEL: 230,000; AUT: 290,000; FIN: 449,800; IRE: 189,500; NZ: 375,000	150 million
Aerosmith	United States	1970–present	1973	Rock	105.4 million: US: 87.25 million; JPN: 2.7 million; GER: 2 million; UK: 5.97 million; FRA: 225,000; CAN: 3.95 million; AUS: 365,000; BRA: 600,000; NLD: 200,000; ITA: 170,000; SPA: 440,000; SWE: 260,000; NOR: 150,000; DEN: 195,000; SWI: 145,000; MEX: 230,000; ARG: 338,000; AUT: 125,000; POL: 100,000; FIN: 101,722	150 million
Phil Collins	United Kingdom	1980–2011, 2015–present	1981	Pop / rock	101.3 million: US: 46.35 million; JPN: 800,000; GER: 14.3 million; UK: 18.85 million; FRA: 6.41 million; CAN: 3.875 million; AUS: 1.595 million; BRA: 1.37 million; NLD: 1.15 million; ITA: 425,000; SPA: 2.15 million; SWE: 245,000; DEN: 390,000; SWI: 973,000; ARG: 1.144 million; BEL: 355,000; AUT: 465,000; FIN: 182,581; NZ: 140,000; POR: 208,000	150 million
Barbra Streisand	United States	1960–present	1963	Pop	98.6 million: US: 82.45 million; GER: 750,000; UK: 6.025 million; FRA: 3.25 million; CAN: 2.65 million; AUS: 2.222 million; NLD: 710,000; SPA: 150,000; SWE: 120,000; FIN: 186,501; NZ: 142,500	150 million
ABBA	Sweden	1972–1982, 2016–2022	1972	Pop / world	72.2 million: US: 12.7 million; JPN: 1.5 million; GER: 11.35 million; UK: 26.665 million; FRA: 2.85 million; CAN: 2.785 million; AUS: 5.662 million; BRA: 305,000; NLD: 1.39 million; ITA: 175,000; SPA: 1.185 million; SWE: 1.02 million; DEN: 1.09 million; SWI: 600,000; MEX: 260,000; ARG: 238,000; BEL: 470,000; AUT: 197,500; POL: 230,000; FIN: 656,319; NZ: 297,500	150 million
Julio Iglesias	Spain	1968–present	1968	Latin / pop	51.7 million: US: 11 million; JPN: 800,000; GER: 250,000; UK: 1.62 million; FRA: 6.1 million; CAN: 1.5 million; AUS: 505,000; BRA: 12.475 million; NLD: 1.2 million; ITA: 435,000; SPA: 8.8 million; SWE: 290,000; MEX: 2.975 million; ARG: 3.22 million; BEL: 125,000; FIN: 131,636; POR: 288,000	150 million
Frank Sinatra	United States	1935–1971, 1973–1995	1940	Easy listening / pop / jazz	41.8 million: US: 28.2 million; GER: 1 million; UK: 9.285 million; FRA: 600,000; CAN: 650,000; AUS: 315,000; BRA: 350,000; ITA: 600,000; SPA: 500,000; SWE: 130,000; ARG: 188,000	150 million
Chris Brown	United States	2005–present	2005	R&B / hip-hop / pop	304.6 million: US: 248.63 million; JPN: 500,000; GER: 2.95 million; UK: 32.72 million; FRA: 933,333; CAN: 2.51 million; AUS: 6.96 million; BRA: 1.05 million; ITA: 325,000; SPA: 520,000; SWE: 410,000; NOR: 315,000; DEN: 1.58 million; SWI: 150,000; MEX: 920,000; POL: 240,000; NZ: 3.91 million	140 million
Jay-Z	United States	1996–present	1996	Hip-hop	178.7 million: US: 147.2 million; JPN: 1.05 million; GER: 2.3 million; UK: 21.38 million; FRA: 650,000; CAN: 2.45 million; AUS: 1.89 million; BRA: 110,000; ITA: 335,000; SPA: 410,000; SWE: 210,000; DEN: 275,000; BEL: 100,000	125 million
Lady Gaga	United States	2005–present	2008	Pop / electronic	168 million: US: 108 million; JPN: 5.4 million; GER: 5.7 million; UK: 24.785 million; FRA: 3.603 million; CAN: 3.68 million; AUS: 4.545 million; BRA: 470,000; NLD: 130,000; ITA: 1.715 million; SPA: 1.46 million; SWE: 680,000; NOR: 2.47 million; DEN: 1.135 million; SWI: 555,000; MEX: 420,000; BEL: 505,000; AUT: 227,500; POL: 755,000; IRE: 165,000; NZ: 472,500; POR: 120,000	124 million
Lil Wayne	United States	1996–present	1999	Hip-hop	205.1 million: US: 195 million; GER: 300,000; UK: 9 million; FRA: 100,000; CAN: 360,000; AUS: 1.2 million; DEN: 190,000	120 million
Maroon 5	United States	1994–present	2002	Pop / rock	147.8 million: US: 100.5 million; JPN: 2.25 million; GER: 3.15 million; UK: 21.1 million; FRA: 1.625 million; CAN: 5.965 million; AUS: 4.305 million; BRA: 1.05 million; ITA: 1.365 million; SPA: 350,000; SWE: 850,000; DEN: 1.237 million; MEX: 4.055 million; SWI: 100,000; BEL: 185,000; POL: 240,000; NZ: 450,000	120 million
Adele	United Kingdom	2006–present	2008	Pop	145.9 million: US: 69 million; JPN: 100,000; GER: 5 million; UK: 40.65 million; FRA: 738,333; CAN: 9.06 million; AUS: 4.675 million; BRA: 4.87 million; NLD: 380,000; ITA: 1.845 million; SPA: 860,000; SWE: 510,000; NOR: 835,000; DEN: 1.712 million; MEX: 2.37 million; SWI: 600,000; BEL: 835,000; POL: 340,000; FIN: 151,639; NZ: 727,500; POR: 110,000	120 million
Red Hot Chili Peppers	United States	1983–present	1987	Rock	122.7 million: US: 74.25 million; JPN: 2.6 million; GER: 4.65 million; UK: 23.715 million; FRA: 1.87 million; CAN: 3.79 million; AUS: 2.66 million; BRA: 1 million; ITA: 1.365 million; NZ: 2.175 million; DEN: 1.04 million; NLD: 660,000; SPA: 640,000; SWE: 390,000; SWI: 405,000; MEX: 150,000; BEL: 195,000; ARG: 406,000; AUT: 257,500; POL: 315,000; FIN: 171,951	120 million
Bon Jovi	United States	1983–present	1983	Metal / rock	113.2 million: US: 72.4 million; JPN: 4.4 million; GER: 5.65 million; UK: 14.19 million; FRA: 825,000; CAN: 4.735 million; AUS: 3.835 million; BRA: 435,000; NLD: 710,000; ITA: 215,000; SPA: 1.62 million; SWE: 365,000; DEN: 185,000; SWI: 1.275 million; MEX: 250,000; ARG: 358,000; BEL: 290,000; AUT: 725,000; POL: 120,000; FIN: 422,500; NZ: 210,000	120 million
Fleetwood Mac	United Kingdom; United States	1967–present	1968	Rock / pop	103.7 million: US: 59.25 million; GER: 3.5 million; UK: 31.725 million; FRA: 800,000; CAN: 2.95 million; AUS: 3.327 million; NLD: 590,000; SPA: 300,000; SWI: 100,000; DEN: 370,000; BEL: 100,000; NZ: 752,500	120 million
Rod Stewart	United Kingdom	1964–present	1969	Rock / pop	84.9 million: US: 46.65 million; JPN: 500,000; GER: 4.05 million; UK: 20.79 million; FRA: 1.8 million; CAN: 4.055 million; AUS: 3.66 million; BRA: 980,000; NLD: 140,000; SPA: 290,000; SWE: 440,000; DEN: 120,000; SWI: 100,000; ARG: 524,000; AUT: 175,000; POL: 220,000; IRE: 195,000; NZ: 285,000	120 million
Bee Gees	United Kingdom; Australia	1963–2003; 2009–2012	1963	Rock / pop	75.5 million: US: 42.5 million; JPN: 300,000; GER: 7.175 million; UK: 13.325 million; FRA: 3.4 million; CAN: 4.215 million; AUS: 1.987 million; BRA: 350,000; ITA: 135,000; NLD: 540,000; SPA: 450,000; SWI: 415,000; ARG: 188,000; AUT: 125,000; POL: 100,000; NZ: 380,000	120 million
Dire Straits	United Kingdom	1977–1995	1978	Rock	61.4 million: US: 15.5 million; GER: 4.85 million; UK: 19.525 million; FRA: 7.305 million; CAN: 2.575 million; AUS: 2.330 million; BRA: 175,000; NLD: 900,000; ITA: 2.01 million; SPA: 1.380 million; SWE: 360,000; DEN: 495,000; SWI: 1 million; BEL: 300,000; POL: 30,000; AUT: 400,000; FIN: 471,530; NZ: 1.74 million	120 million
Roberto Carlos	Brazil	1961–present	1963	Latin / pop / rock	54.3 million: BRA: 52.9 million; SPA: 450.000; MEX: 225.000; ARG: 780.000	120 million

=== Over 100 million ===
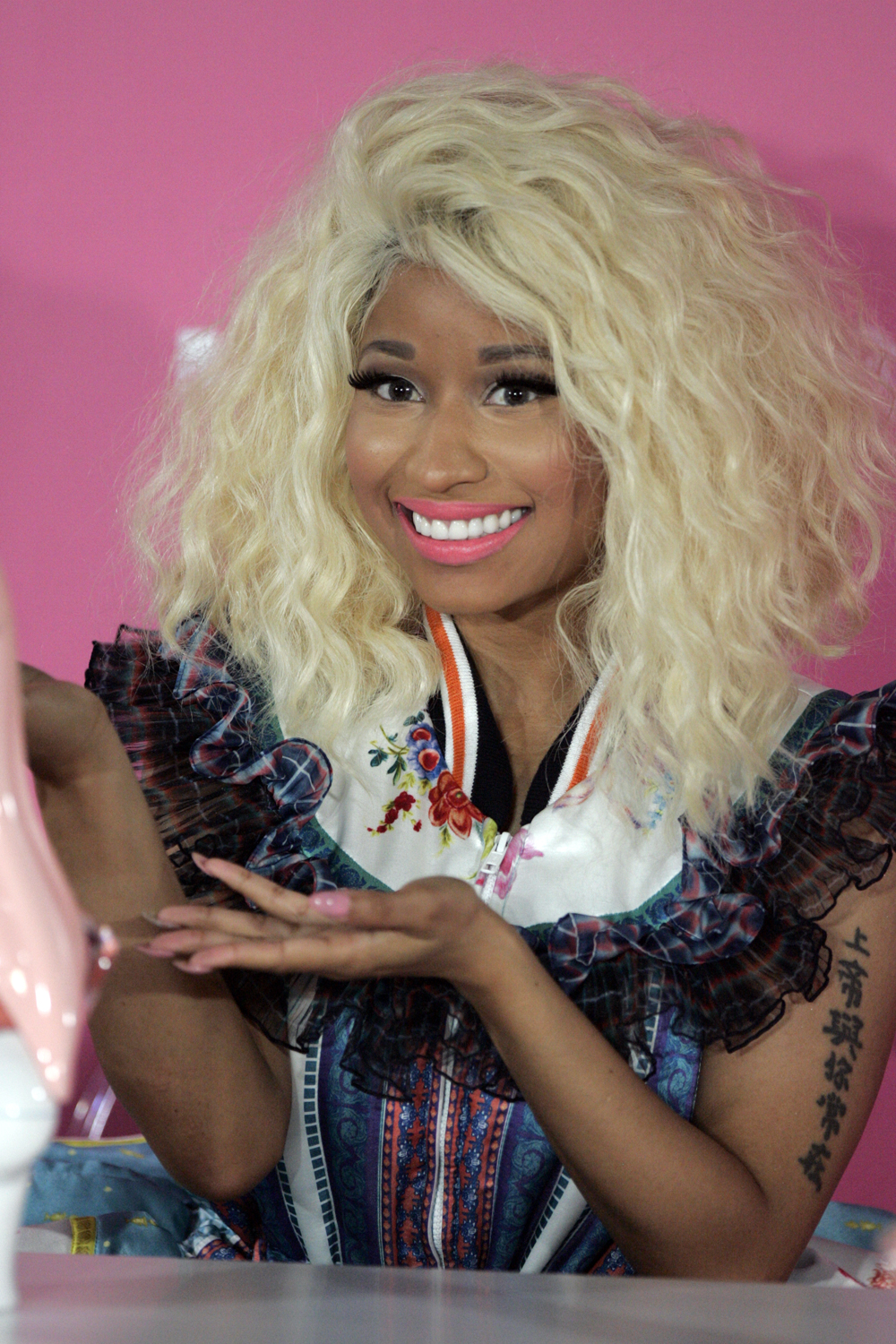
Nicki Minaj

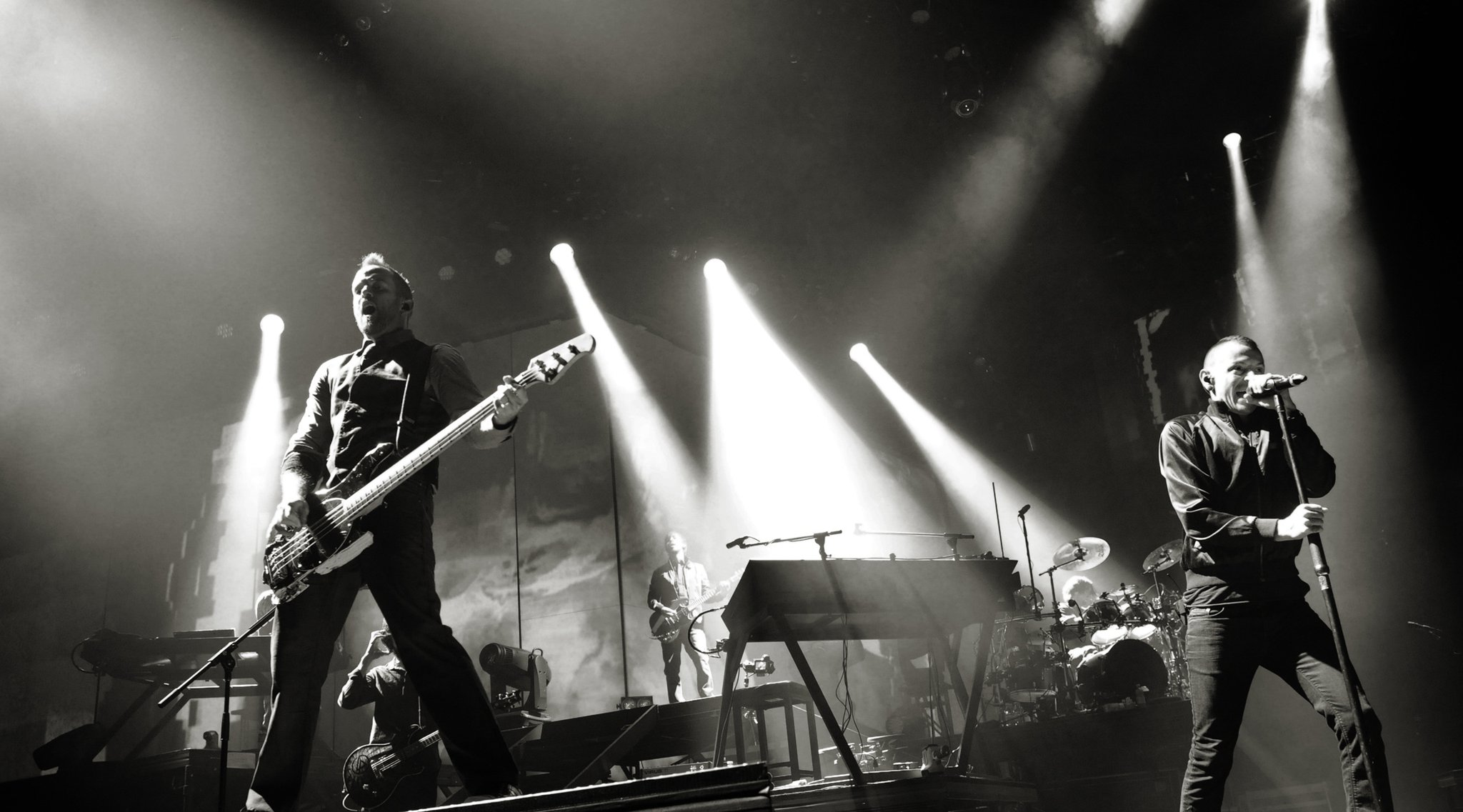
Linkin Park

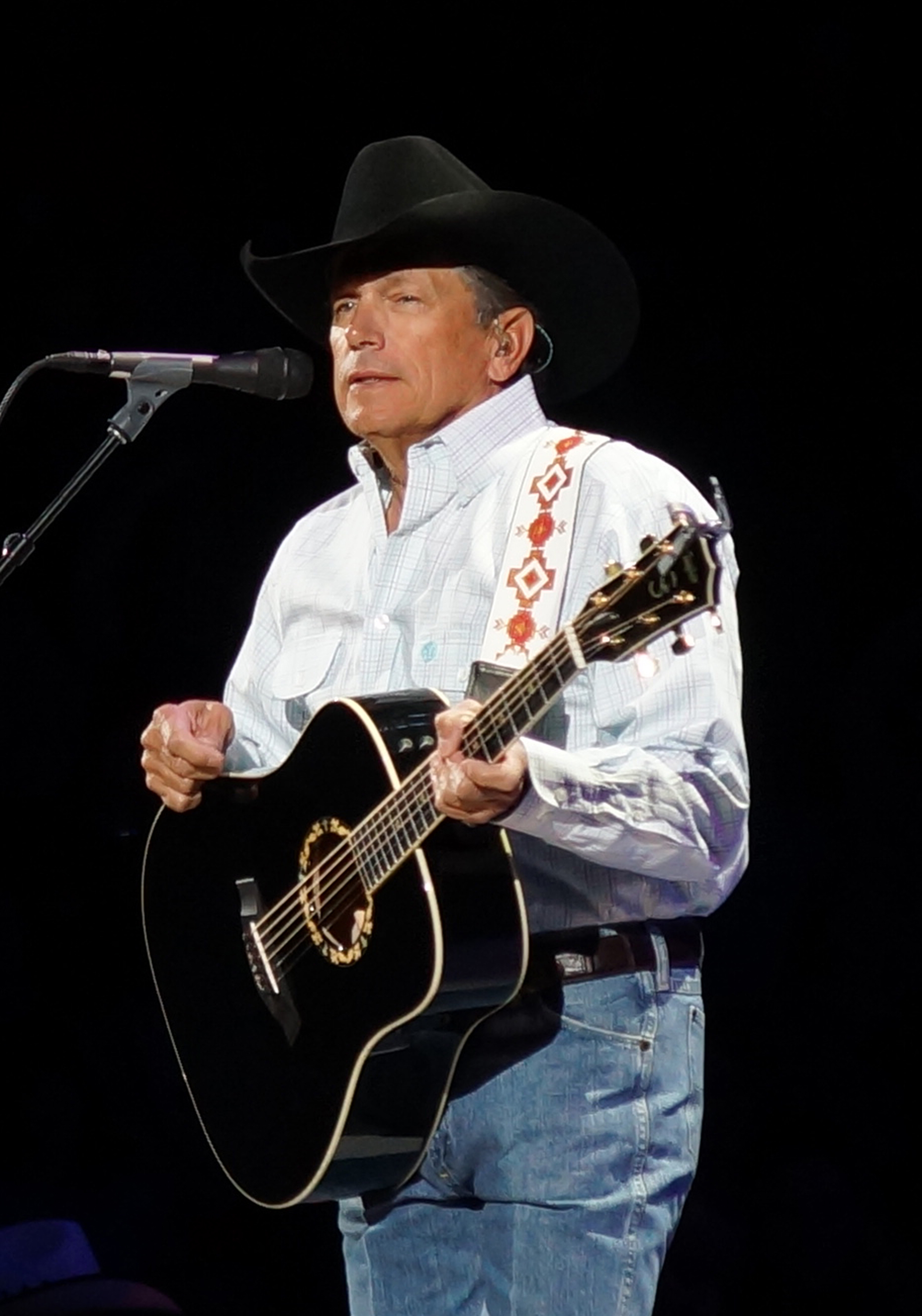
George Strait

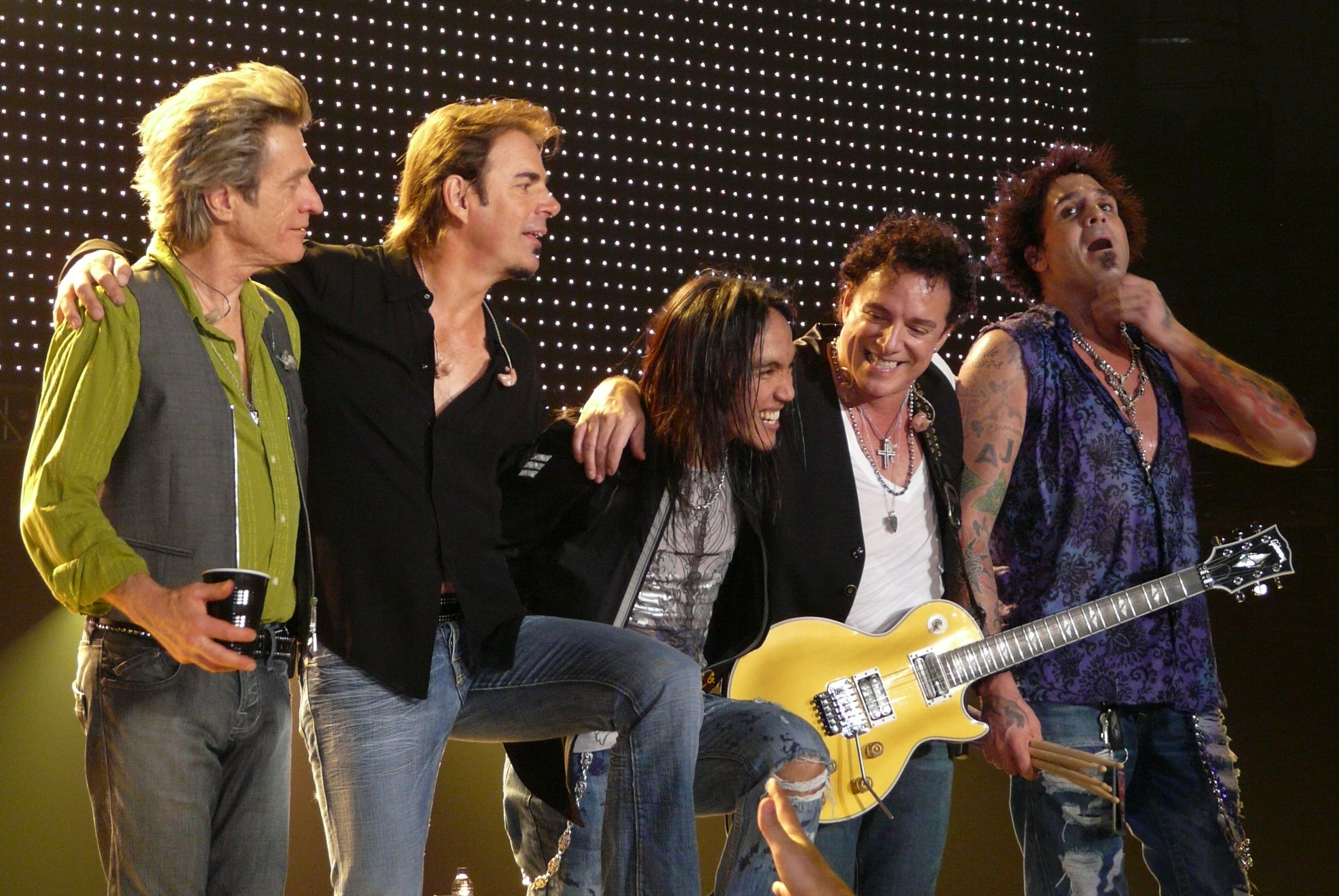
Journey

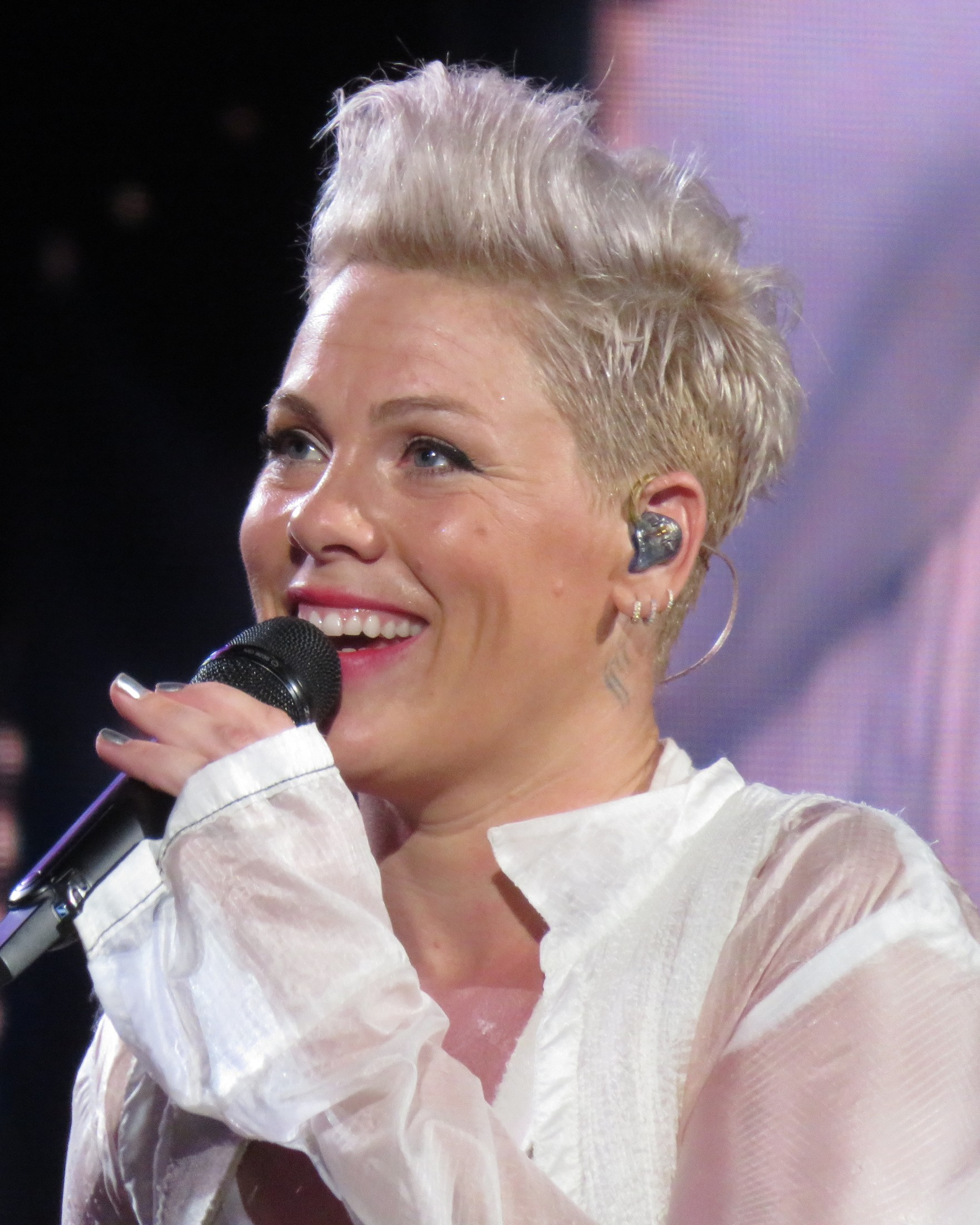
Pink

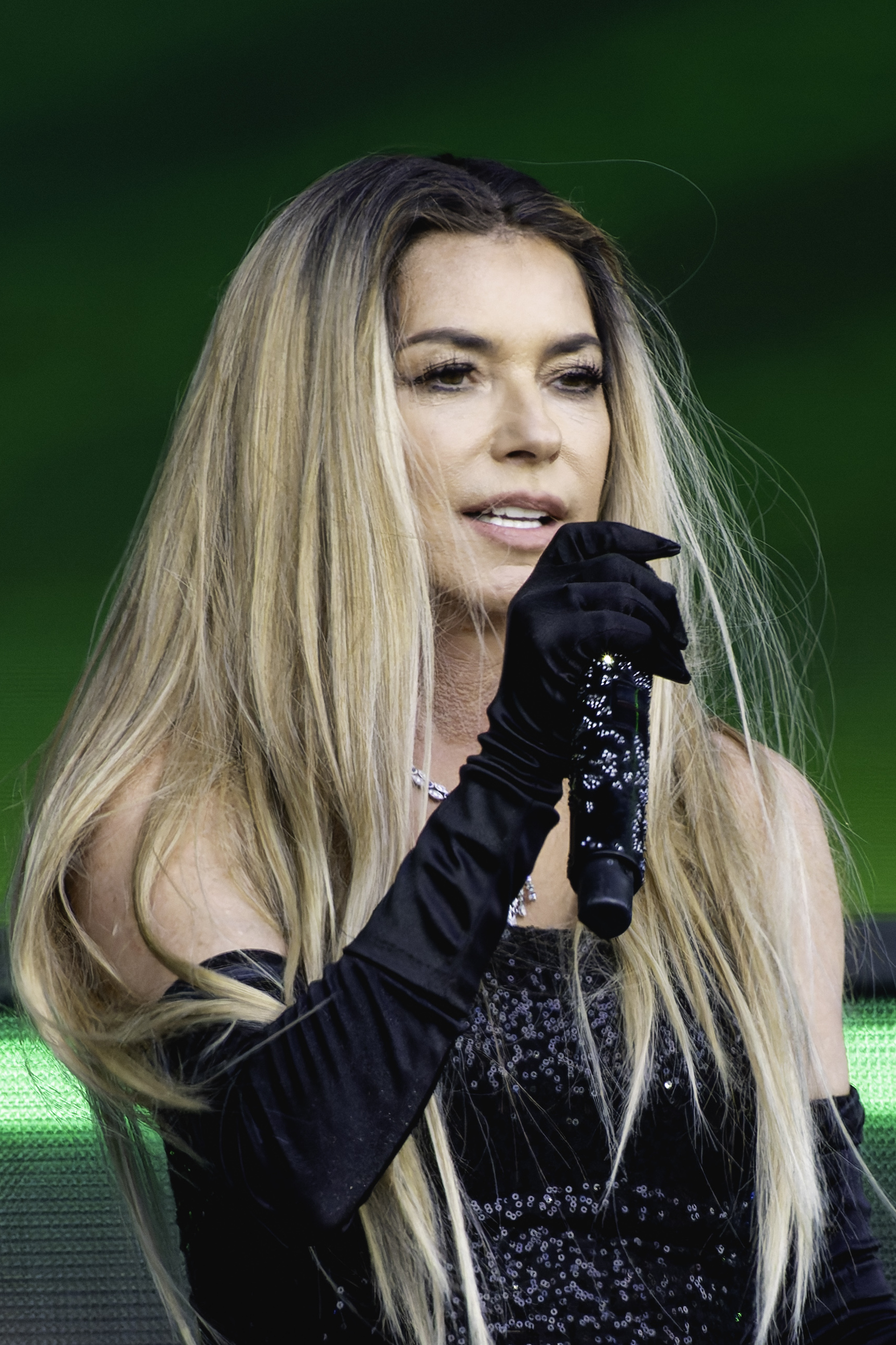
Shania Twain

Artist	Country	Period active	Release-year of first charted record	Genre	Total certified units (from available markets)	Claimed sales
Nicki Minaj	Trinidad and Tobago	2007–present	2010	Hip-hop / pop	179.5 million: US: 132.96 million; JPN: 550,000; GER: 2.45 million; UK: 24.4 million; FRA: 1.099 million; CAN: 2.96 million; AUS: 4.235 million; BRA: 470,000; ITA: 775,000; SPA: 610,000; SWE: 420,000; NOR: 595,000; DEN: 430,000; SWI: 180,000; MEX: 6.96 million; POL: 185,000; NZ: 247,500	100 million
Linkin Park	United States	1996–present	2000	Metal / rock	140.5 million: US: 81.6 million; JPN: 1.55 million; GER: 17.05 million; UK: 25.585 million; FRA: 2.608 million; CAN: 2.55 million; AUS: 1.547 million; ITA: 1.965 million; NZ: 1.837 million; DEN: 1.19 million; BRA: 765,000; SPA: 200,000; SWE: 165,000; SWI: 435,000; MEX: 225,000; ARG: 108,000; BEL: 140,000; NLD: 100,000; AUT: 350,000; POL: 270,000; FIN: 120,469; POR: 140,000	100 million
George Strait	United States	1981–present	1984	Country	110.8 million: US: 110.15 million; CAN: 745,000	100 million
Journey	United States	1973–present	1975	Rock	109.4 million: US: 103 million; JPN: 300,000; GER: 1.2 million; UK: 3 million; CAN: 725,000; AUS: 840,000; DEN: 180,000; NZ: 240,000	100 million
Pink	United States	1995–present	2000	Pop / rock / R&B	94.3 million: US: 35.725 million; JPN: 400,000; GER: 6.325 million; UK: 26.085 million; FRA: 1.448 million; CAN: 7.21 million; AUS: 10.57 million; BRA: 1.53 million; NLD: 215,000; ITA: 450,000; SWE: 710,000; NOR: 215,000; DEN: 516,500; SWI: 675,000; MEX: 750,000; BEL: 275,000; AUT: 447,500; POL: 220,000; FIN: 130,442; NZ: 532,500	100 million
Guns N' Roses	United States	1985–present	1987	Rock	90.4 million: US: 49.3 million; JPN: 1.7 million; GER: 5.55 million; UK: 16.35 million; FRA: 1 million; CAN: 3.52 million; AUS: 3.215 million; BRA: 1.9 million; NLD: 705,000; ITA: 850,000; SPA: 450,000; SWE: 485,000; NOR: 250,000; DEN: 530,000; SWI: 365,000; MEX: 760,000; ARG: 1.248 million; BEL: 165,000; AUT: 365,000; POL: 160,000; IRE: 105,000; FIN: 267,540; NZ: 1.17 million	100 million
Christina Aguilera	United States	1993–present	1998	Pop / R&B	88.9 million: US: 56.2 million; JPN: 600,000; GER: 3.675 million; UK: 15.010 million; FRA: 575,000; CAN: 3.5 million; AUS: 3.275 million; BRA: 1,540,000; NLD: 170,000; ITA: 215,000; SPA: 590,000; SWE: 500,000; DEN: 768,500; SWI: 225,000; MEX: 905,000; ARG: 100,000; BEL: 260,000; AUT: 140,000; NZ: 195,000	100 million
Shania Twain	Canada	1993–present	1993	Country / pop	87.4 million: US: 60.9 million; JPN: 400,000; GER: 1.75 million; UK: 10.355 million; FRA: 975,000; CAN: 6.88 million; AUS: 2.85 million; BRA: 475,000; NLD: 540,000; SPA: 130,000; SWE: 330,000; NOR: 430,000; DEN: 210,000; SWI: 310,000; MEX: 100,000; ARG: 120,000; BEL: 250,000; AUT: 115,000; NZ: 402,500	100 million
B'z	Japan	1988–present	1988	Rock / pop / world	86.2 million: JPN: 86.250 million	100 million
Backstreet Boys	United States	1993–present	1995	Pop	79.9 million: US: 44.5 million; JPN: 5.4 million; GER: 7 million; UK: 6.875 million; FRA: 325,000; CAN: 3.63 million; AUS: 2.485 million; BRA: 1.625 million; NLD: 830,000; SPA: 1.97 million; SWE: 655,000; NOR: 140,000; DEN: 465,000; SWI: 415,000; MEX: 1.475 million; ARG: 740,000; BEL: 450,000; AUT: 325,000; POL: 300,000; FIN: 171,390; NZ: 132,500	100 million
Eric Clapton	United Kingdom	1962–present	1970	Rock / blues	71.6 million: US: 47.7 million; JPN: 3.95 million; GER: 3.03 million; UK: 7.79 million; FRA: 1.475 million; CAN: 2.275 million; AUS: 1.115 million; BRA: 715,000; NLD: 745,000; ITA: 120,000; SPA: 760,000; SWE: 320,000; DEN: 170,000; SWI: 385,000; ARG: 420,000; BEL: 125,000; AUT: 285,000; POL: 145,000; FIN: 129,679; NZ: 102,500	100 million
Neil Diamond	United States	1966–present	1966	Pop / rock	72.1 million: US: 55.9 million; GER: 1 million; UK: 10.47 million; FRA: 400,000; CAN: 1.725 million; AUS: 2.19 million; NLD: 250,000; SPA: 100,000; NZ: 132,500	100 million
Prince	United States	1976–2016	1978	R&B / rock / pop	67.6 million: US: 48.95 million; JPN: 300,000; GER: 2.4 million; UK: 9.545 million; FRA: 2.11 million; CAN: 1 million; AUS: 1.12 million; NLD: 670,000; SPA: 700,000; SWE: 100,000; DEN: 140,000; SWI: 300,000; AUT: 150,000; NZ: 182,500	100 million
Paul McCartney	United Kingdom	1960–present	1970	Rock / pop / electronic	67.5 million: US: 44.45 million; JPN: 500,000; GER: 1.925 million; UK: 15.325 million; FRA: 1.405 million; CAN: 1.995 million; AUS: 745,000; SPA: 640,000; SWE: 210,000; DEN: 405,000	100 million
Janet Jackson	United States	1982–present	1982	R&B / pop	65.3 million: US: 52.25 million; JPN: 1.6 million; GER: 1.4 million; UK: 4.96 million; FRA: 1.475 million; CAN: 1.46 million; AUS: 1.19 million; NLD: 400,000; SPA: 150,000; SWE: 105,000; SWI: 170,000; BEL: 175,000	100 million
Kenny Rogers	United States	1958–2020	1975	Country / pop	64.7 million: US: 55.55 million; JPN: 100,000; UK: 3.92 million; CAN: 4.74 million; AUS: 175,000; SPA: 100,000; NZ: 130,000	100 million
The Doors	United States	1965–1973	1967	Rock	63.1 million: US: 49.6 million; GER: 1.750 million; UK: 3.840 million; FRA: 2.2 million; CAN: 2.780 million; AUS: 1.267 million; BRA: 100,000; ITA: 380,000; NZ: 230,000; SPA: 610,000; SWI: 125,000; ARG: 150,000; AUT: 125,000	100 million
Santana	United States	1966–present	1969	Rock / Latin	62.8 million: US: 47.475 million; JPN: 400,000; GER: 2.4 million; UK: 3.480 million; FRA: 3.510 million; CAN: 1.660 million; AUS: 855,000; BRA: 375,000; NLD: 540,000; SPA: 450,000; SWE: 125,000; SWI: 375,000; MEX: 405,000; ARG: 158,000; BEL: 190,000; AUT: 145,000; POL: 205,000; NZ: 135,000	100 million
Simon & Garfunkel	United States	1956–2004	1964	Pop / folk / rock	62.1 million: US: 42.6 million; JPN: 700,000; GER: 2.325 million; UK: 9.4 million; FRA: 3.9 million; CAN: 1.425 million; AUS: 390,000; NLD: 300,000; ITA: 125,000; SWE: 150,000; NOR: 140,000; SWI: 450,000; AUT: 100,000; FIN: 163,350	100 million
The Beach Boys	United States	1961–present	1962	Rock / pop	60.5 million: US: 53 million; GER: 250,000; UK: 5.610 million; FRA: 400,000; CAN: 100,000; AUS: 492,500; NZ: 402,500; SPA: 250,000	100 million
George Michael	United Kingdom	1981–2016	1984	Pop / R&B	54.6 million: US: 20.8 million; JPN: 300,000; GER: 2.4 million; UK: 18.810 million; FRA: 3.217 million; CAN: 1.870 million; AUS: 2.205 million; BRA: 510,000; NLD: 1.190 million; ITA: 115,000; SPA: 850,000; SWE: 310,000; NOR: 160,000; DEN: 520,000; SWI: 335,000; ARG: 118,000; BEL: 315,000; AUT: 140,000; POL: 340,000; NZ: 140,000	100 million
Foreigner	United States; United Kingdom	1976–present	1977	Rock	50.4 million: US: 45.1 million; GER: 1.5 million; UK: 2.3 million; FRA: 400,000; CAN: 700,000; AUS: 140,000; NLD: 150,000; SWI: 125,000	100 million
Bob Dylan	United States	1959–present	1963	Rock / folk / blues / gospel / pop	64.5 million: US: 51.1 million; GER: 625,000; UK: 9.090 million; FRA: 800,000; CAN: 1.5 million; AUS: 690,000; ITA: 170,000; NOR: 250,000; SWI: 175,000; NZ: 105,000	100 million
Chicago	United States	1967–present	1969	Rock	48.5 million: US: 44.150 million; JPN: 400,000; GER: 250,000; UK: 1.490 million; FRA: 100,000; CAN: 1.865 million; AUS: 105,000; NLD: 100,000; SPA: 130,000	100 million
Cher	United States	1964–present	1965	Pop / rock / folk	47.7 million: US: 22.9 million; JPN: 200,000; GER: 4.175 million; UK: 11.150 million; FRA: 1.600 million; CAN: 1.420 million; AUS: 1.600 million; BRA: 150,000; NLD: 375,000; ITA: 325,000; SPA: 660,000; SWE: 850,000; NOR: 115,000; DEN: 615,000; SWI: 295,000; MEX: 200,000; ARG: 106,000; BEL: 275,000; AUT: 250,000; POL: 100,000; NZ: 360,000	100 million
Meat Loaf	United States	1968–2022	1977	Rock	47 million: US: 25.6 million; GER: 2.350 million; UK: 12.065 million; CAN: 3.380 million; AUS: 2.662 million; NLD: 425,000; SWE: 100,000; SWI: 115,000; AUT: 100,000; NZ: 302,500	100 million
The Carpenters	United States	1969–1983	1969	Rock / pop / easy listening	47 million: US: 34.6 million; JPN: 3.050 million; GER: 250,000; UK: 8.750 million; CAN: 275,000; BRA: 100,000	100 million
Earth, Wind & Fire	United States	1969–present	1971	R&B / pop	44.7 million: US: 37.7 million; JPN: 500,000; UK: 4.585 million; FRA: 500,000; CAN: 360,000; AUS: 420,000; NLD: 250,000; DEN: 180,000; MEX: 210,000	100 million
David Bowie	United Kingdom	1962–2016	1967	Rock / pop / electronic	44.2 million: US: 15.7 million; JPN: 200,000; GER: 525,000; UK: 20.695 million; FRA: 2.430 million; CAN: 2.315 million; AUS: 845,000; NLD: 465,000; ITA: 570,000; SPA: 170,000; DEN: 200,000; NZ: 142,500	100 million
Def Leppard	United Kingdom	1977–present	1979	Metal / rock	42.6 million: US: 36.150 million; JPN: 300,000; UK: 2.120 million; FRA: 200,000; CAN: 2.995 million; AUS: 407,500; SWE: 150,000; SWI: 125,000; MEX: 200,000	100 million
Stevie Wonder	United States	1961–present	1962	R&B / pop / gospel	41.6 million: US: 21.650 million; JPN: 1.050 million; GER: 750,000; UK: 14.145 million; FRA: 1.4 million; CAN: 1.550 million; NLD: 250,000; ITA: 100,000; SPA: 430,000; DEN: 135,000	100 million
Genesis	United Kingdom	1967–1999; 2006–2007; 2020–2022	1969	Rock	40.3 million: US: 21.650 million; JPN: 100,000; GER: 5.875 million; UK: 7.565 million; FRA: 3.260 million; CAN: 805,000; NLD: 300,000; SPA: 250,000; SWE: 100,000; SWI: 450,000	100 million
Gloria Estefan	United States	1975–present	1984	Latin / pop	39.6 million: US: 27.16 million; JPN: 600,000; GER: 250,000; UK: 4.760 million; FRA: 325,000; CAN: 940,000; AUS: 455,000; NLD: 625,000; SPA: 3.240 million; SWI: 110,000; MEX: 825,000; ARG: 380,000; NZ: 30,000	100 million
Tina Turner	United States	1958–2009	1960	R&B / rock / pop	37.7 million: US: 12.7 million; GER: 6.5 million; UK: 11.435 million; FRA: 1.135 million; CAN: 1.6 million; AUS: 480,000; NLD: 565,000; SPA: 790,000; SWE: 330,000; NOR: 185,000; SWI: 675,000; BEL: 190,000; AUT: 745,000; POL: 140,000; FIN: 241,954	100 million
Mötley Crüe	United States	1981–present	1983	Pop / rock	37.59 million: US: 34.3 million; JPN: 300,000; UK: 1.22 million; CAN: 1.49 million; AUS: 170,000; NZ: 110,000	100 million
James Taylor	United States	1968–present	1970	Rock / pop / folk	36.5 million: US: 35.250 million; UK: 1.055 million; CAN: 100,000; AUS: 100,000	100 million
Olivia Newton-John	United Kingdom; Australia	1966–2022	1966	Pop / country	36.1 million: US: 27 million; JPN: 100,000; GER: 500,000; UK: 3.950 million; FRA: 1 million; CAN: 3.025 million; AUS: 450,000; NLD: 150,000	100 million
Linda Ronstadt	United States	1967–2011	1968	Rock / folk / pop / country	33.2 million: US: 31.5 million; UK: 435,000; FRA: 100,000; CAN: 500,000; AUS: 665,000	100 million
Donna Summer	United States	1968–2012	1974	R&B / pop	31.7 million: US: 24.5 million; UK: 4.455 million; FRA: 900,000; CAN: 1.550 million; BRA: 100,000; NLD: 100,000; SPA: 100,000	100 million
Diana Ross	United States	1959–present	1970	R&B / pop	17.5 million: US: 6.55 million; UK: 8.02 million; AUT: 50,000; BEL: 75,000; CAN: 1.75 million; DEN: 90,000; FRA: 100,000; GER: 250,000; ITA: 50,000; NLD: 450,000; NOR: 25,000; NZ: 60,000; SPA: 30,000; SWI: 25,000	100 million
The Supremes	United States	1959–1977	1962	R&B / pop	7 million: US: 4.6 million; UK: 2.18 million; DEN: 45,000; ITA: 50,000; NZ: 97,500; SPA: 30,000	100 million

=== Over 80 million ===
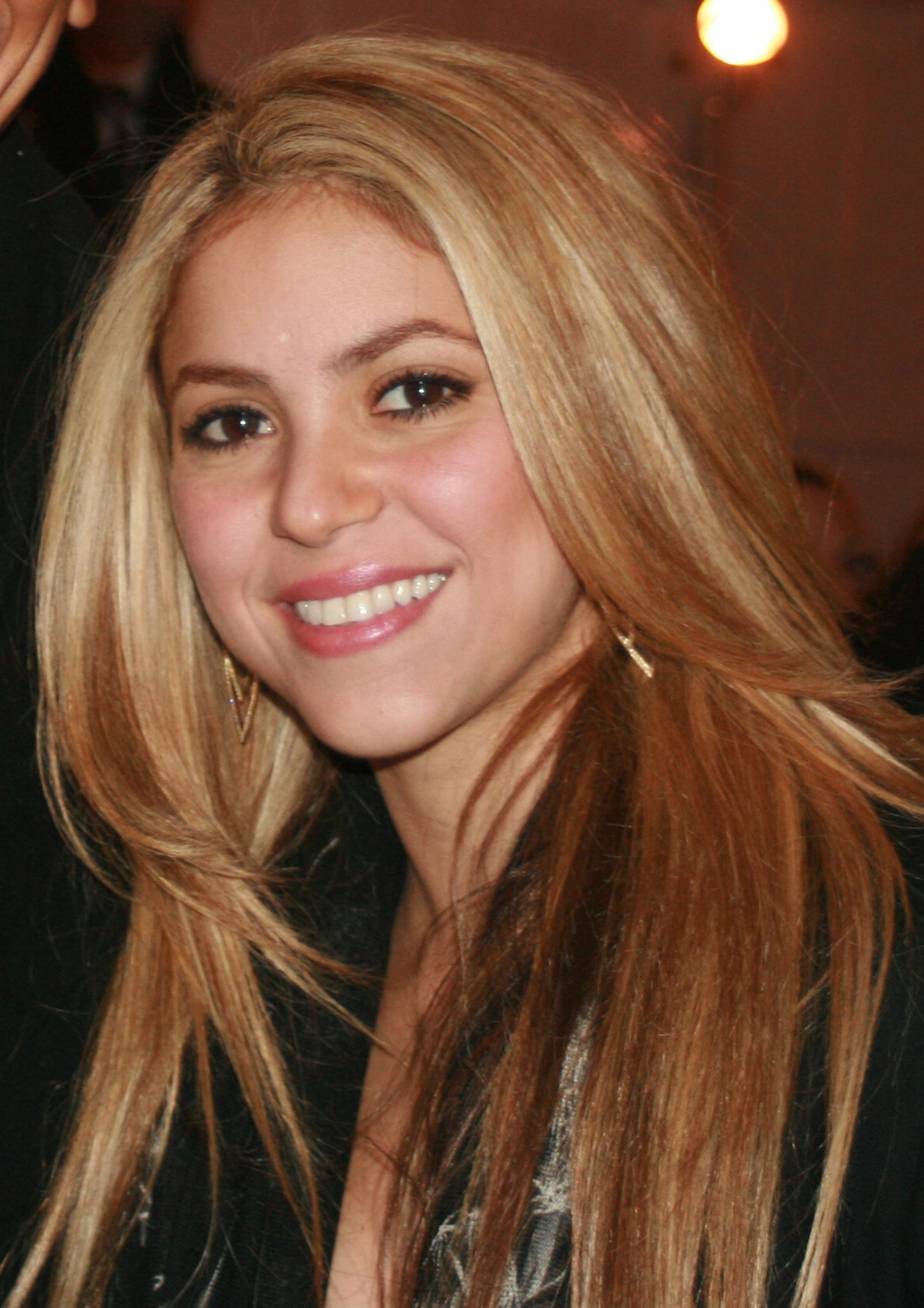
Shakira

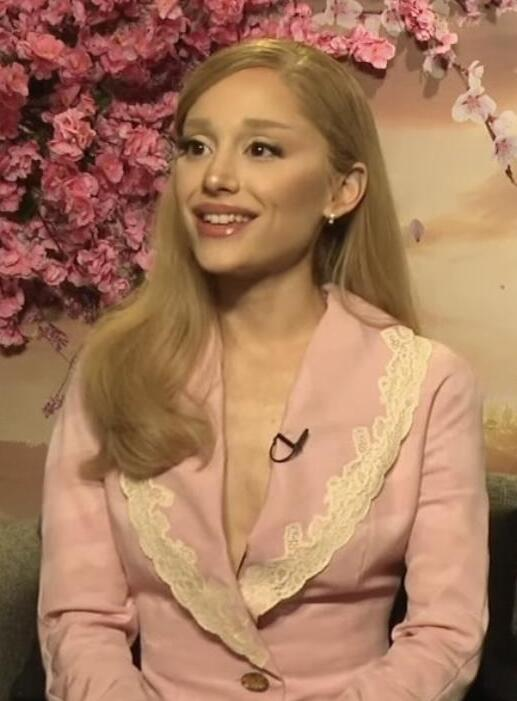
Ariana Grande

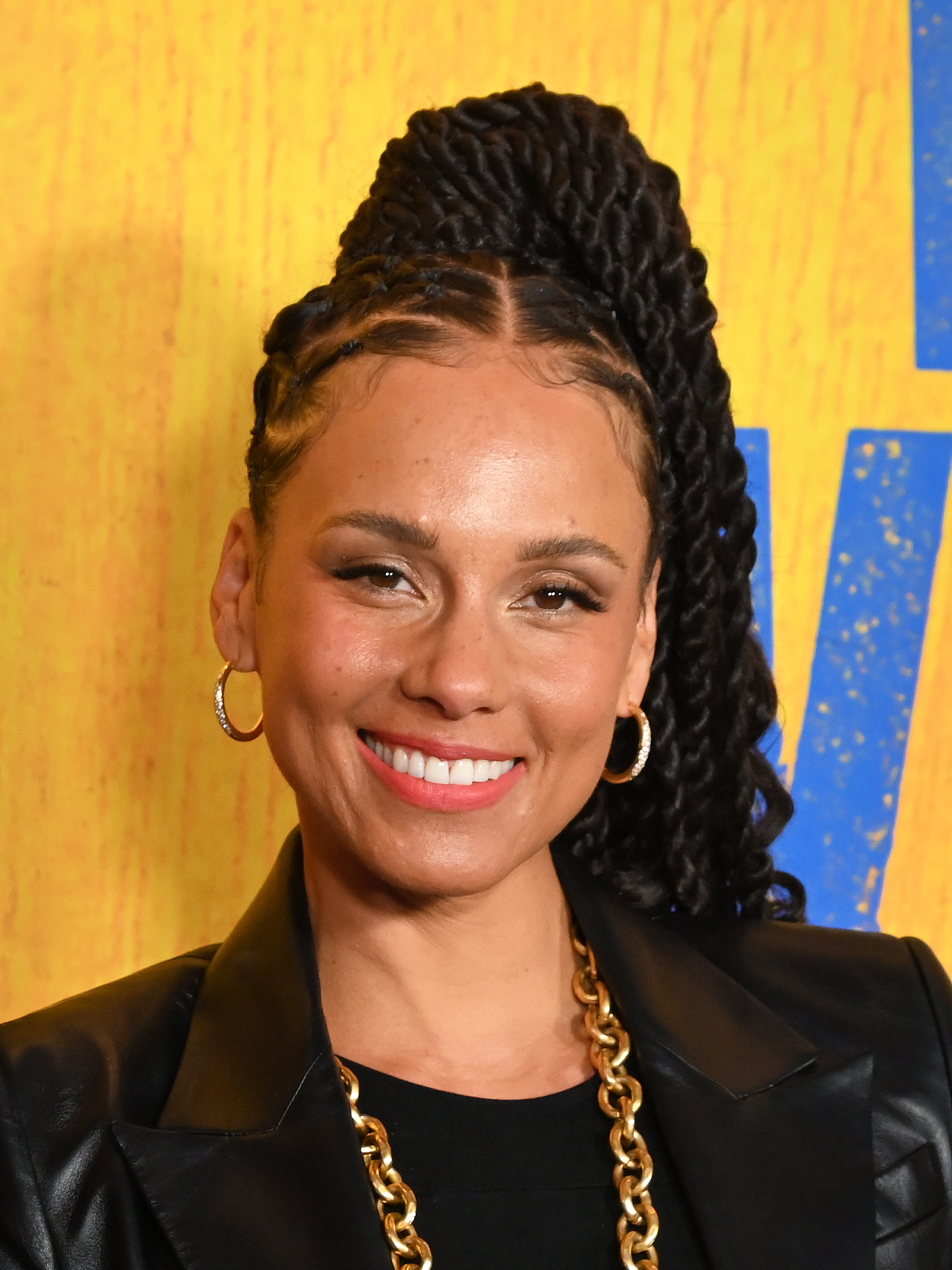
Alicia Keys

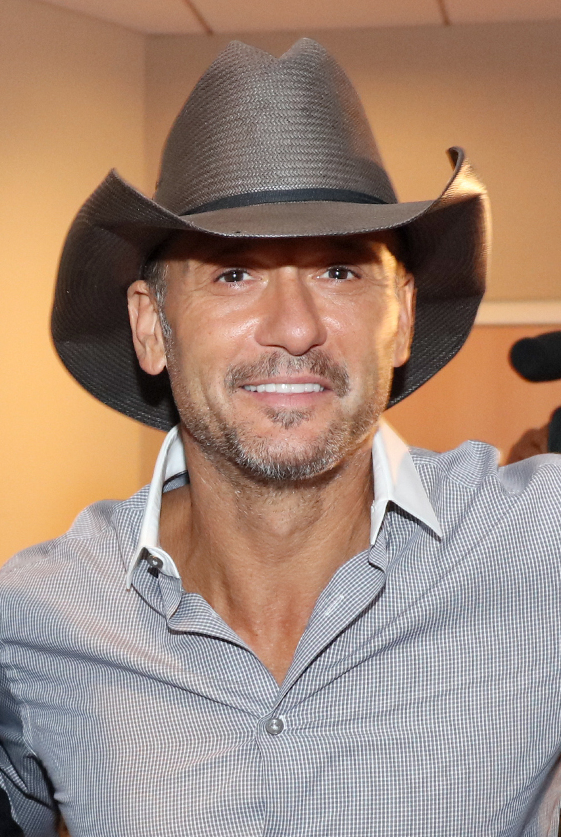
Tim McGraw

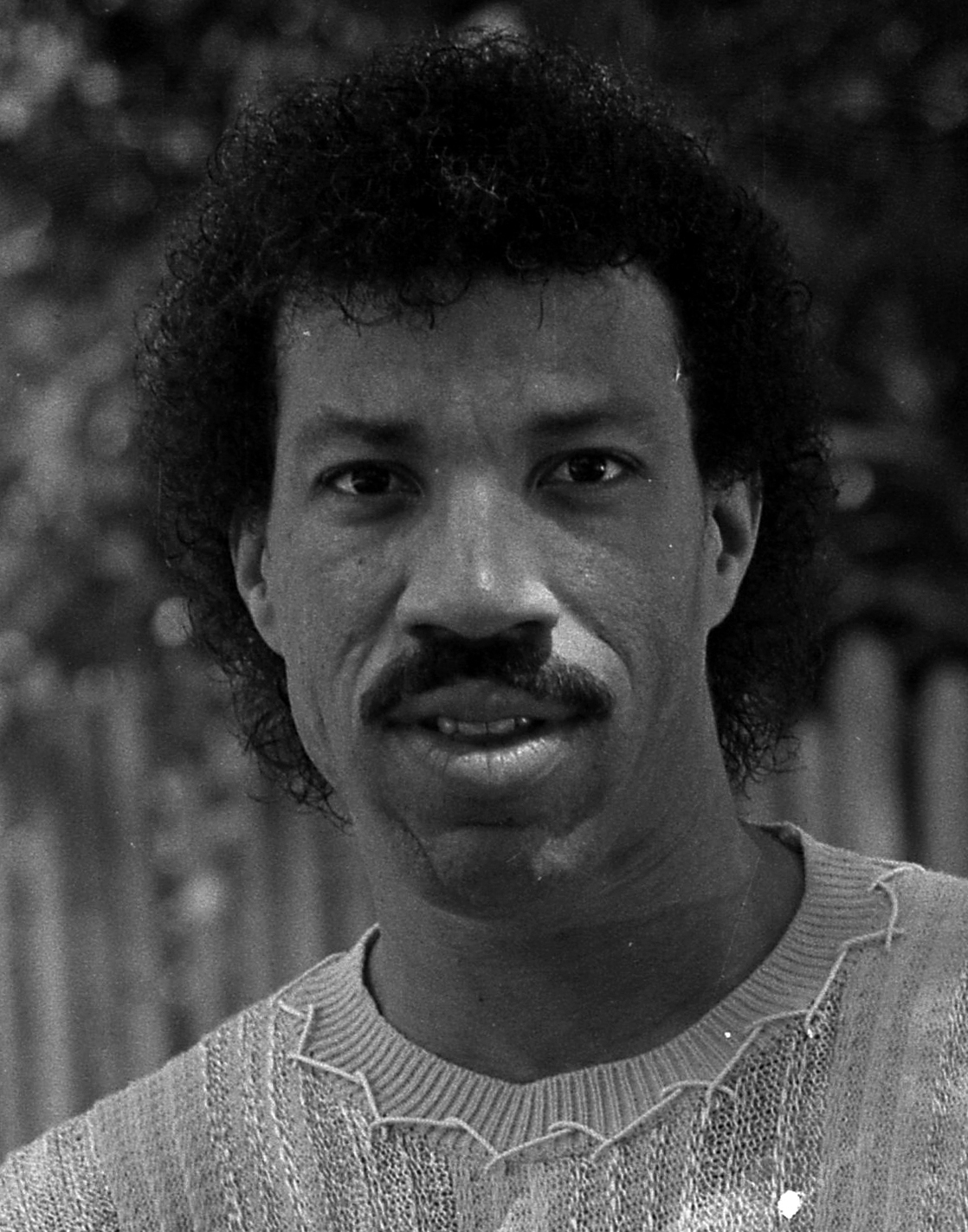
Lionel Richie

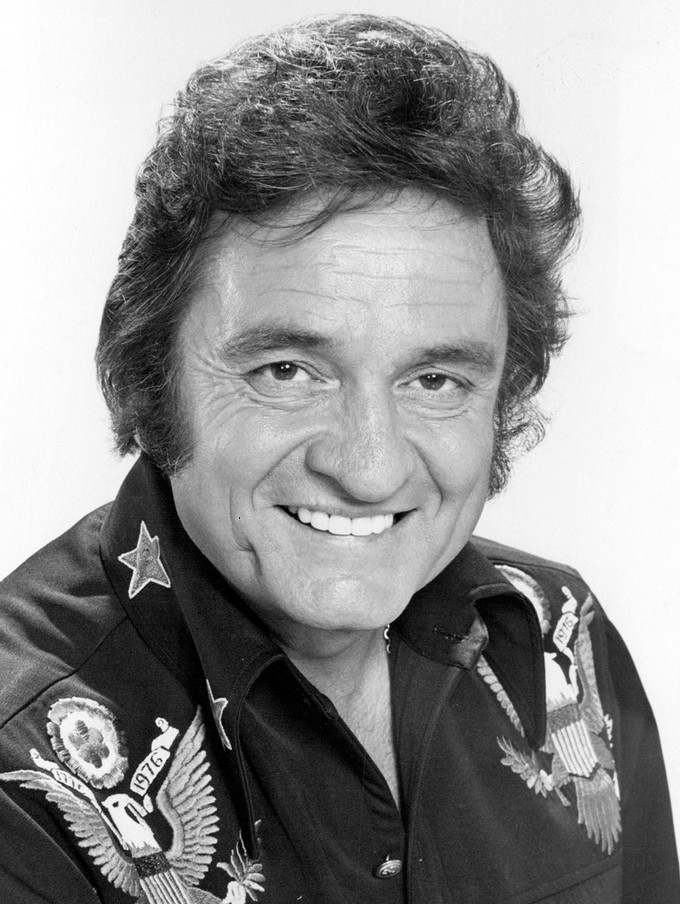
Johnny Cash

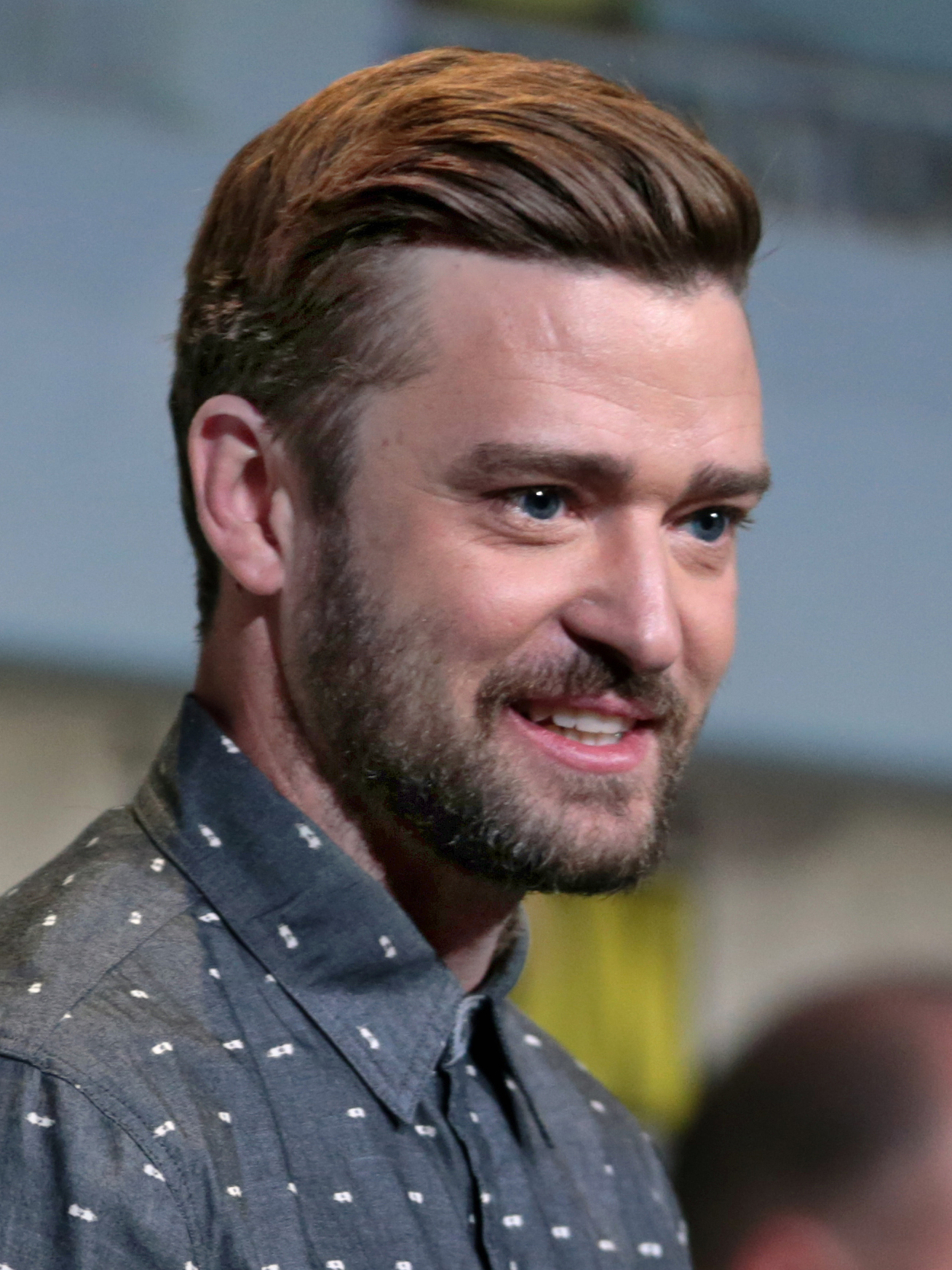
Justin Timberlake

Artist	Country	Period active	Release-year of first charted record	Genre	Total certified units (from available markets)	Claimed sales
Shakira	Colombia	1988–present	1995	Latin / pop	125.35 million: US: 45.280 million; GER: 6.4 million; UK: 10.3 million; FRA: 6.275 million; CAN: 4.330 million; AUS: 1.687 million; BRA: 5.855 million; NLD: 380,000; ITA: 1.905 million; SPA: 7.720 million; SWE: 830,000; NOR: 225,000; DEN: 360,000; SWI: 895,000; MEX: 29.23 million; ARG: 1.35 million; BEL: 500,000; AUT: 385,000; POL: 530,000; FIN: 123,950; NZ: 480,000; POR: 315,000	95 million
Ariana Grande	United States	2008–present	2013	Pop / R&B	305.307 million: US: 182.8 million; JPN: 1.44 million; GER: 5.6 million; UK: 44.70 million; FRA: 4.378 million; KOR: 2.55 million; CAN: 12.60 million; AUS: 13.72 million; BRA: 14.44 million; NLD: 160,000; ITA: 1.680 million; SPA: 1.540 million; SWE: 3.845 million; NOR: 3.605 million; DEN: 2.890 million; SWI: 500,000; MEX: 1.190 million; BEL: 360,000; AUT: 697,500; POL: 2.29 million; NZ: 3.850 million; POR: 327,500	90 million
Alicia Keys	United States	1996–present	2001	R&B / pop	99.9 million: US: 78.050 million; JPN: 1.050 million; GER: 2.500 million; UK: 10.720 million; FRA: 1.127 million; CAN: 1.6 million; AUS: 2.170 million; NLD: 460,000; ITA: 310,000; SPA: 500,000; SWE: 200,000; DEN: 277,500; SWI: 275,000; MEX: 300,000; BEL: 185,000; AUT: 130,000; POL: 100,000	90 million
Tim McGraw	United States	1990–present	1994	Country	82.3 million: US: 80.65 million; UK: 200,000; CAN: 1.535 million	90 million
Lionel Richie	United States	1968–present	1981	R&B / pop	43.8 million: US: 28.65 million; GER: 1.05 million; UK: 9.555 million; FRA: 1.4 million; CAN: 2.38 million; AUS: 260,000; BRA: 100,000; NLD: 605,000; SPA: 150,000; SWI: 170,000; BEL: 100,000	90 million
Andrea Bocelli	Italy	1982–present	1994	Operatic pop	36.9 million: US: 19.335 million; GER: 2.9 million; UK: 3.087 million; FRA: 2.250 million; CAN: 4.210 million; AUS: 477,500; BRA: 725,000; NLD: 1.26 million; ITA: 1.79 million; SPA: 240,000; SWE: 220,000; NOR: 485,000; DEN: 55,000; SWI: 515,000; MEX: 175,000; ARG: 160,000; BEL: 740,000; AUT: 275,000; POL: 310,000; FIN: 83,633; NZ: 97,500	90 million
Johnny Cash	United States	1954–2003	1956	Country / folk / rock / gospel / blues	32.2 million: US: 25.7 million; GER: 550,000; UK: 5.01 million; CAN: 490,000; AUS: 522,500	90 million
Justin Timberlake	United States	1992–present	2002	Pop / R&B	93.3 million: US: 53.32 million; JPN: 200,000; GER: 4.5 million; UK: 20.27 million; FRA: 778,000; CAN: 3.52 million; AUS: 2.915 million; BRA: 2.635 million; NLD: 185,000; ITA: 570,000; SPA: 250,000; SWE: 560,000; DEN: 1.125 million; SWI: 250,000; MEX: 710,000; BEL: 325,000; POL: 240,000; NZ: 227,500	88 million
Pearl Jam	United States	1990–present	1991	Rock	48.4 million: US: 36.15 million; UK: 3.45 million; CAN: 3.06 million; AUS: 2.47 million; GER: 250,000; BRA: 670,000; NLD: 250,000; ITA: 335,000; SPA: 260,000; NOR: 50,000; SWE: 50,000; DEN: 105,000; POL: 170,000; SWI: 25,000; POR: 89,000; ARG: 50,000; BEL: 50,000; NZ: 930,000	85 million
R.E.M.	United States	1980–2011	1983	Rock	45.3 million: US: 21.65 million; GER: 4.275 million; UK: 10.46 million; FRA: 1.45 million; CAN: 2.65 million; AUS: 1.03 million; BRA: 100,000; NLD: 100,000; ITA: 255,000; SPA: 1.1 million; SWE: 500,000; NOR: 135,000; DEN: 290,000; SWI: 450,000; ARG: 158,000; BEL: 210,000; AUT: 350,000; IRE: 127,500; NZ: 105,000	85 million
Kelly Clarkson	United States	2002–present	2002	Pop / rock	50.2 million: US: 31 million; JPN: 200,000; GER: 1.35 million; UK: 10.46 million; FRA: 35,000; CAN: 1.4 million; AUS: 1.835 million; BRA: 110,000; NLD: 40,000; ITA: 50,000; SPA: 60,000; SWE: 140,000; NOR: 210,000; DEN: 420,000; MEX: 80,000; BEL: 50,000; NZ: 487,500; POR: 15,000	82 million
Post Malone	United States	2013–present	2015	Pop / hip-hop	268.9 million: US: 189 million; GER: 4.5 million; UK: 25.02 million; FRA: 1.533 million; CAN: 17.04 million; AUS: 12.64 million; BRA: 6.230 million; NLD: 640,000; ITA: 1.495 million; SPA: 750,000; SWE: 900,000; NOR: 420,000; DEN: 3.315 million; MEX: 1.26 million; BEL: 235,000; POL: 1.165 million; NZ: 2.400 million; POR: 446,000	80 million
Flo Rida	United States	2007–present	2007	Hip-hop / pop	90.7 million: US: 61.5 million; JPN: 650,000; GER: 4.1 million; UK: 14.62 million; FRA: 225,000; CAN: 3.09 million; AUS: 3.605 million; ITA: 515,000; SPA: 140,000; SWE: 780,000; DEN: 420,000; SWI: 420,000; MEX: 330,000; AUT: 210,000; POL: 100,000; NZ: 247,500	80 million
Usher	United States	1991–present	1994	R&B / pop	166.8 million: US: 139.810 million; JPN: 750,000; GER: 2.2 million; UK: 15.125 million; FRA: 210,000; CAN: 3.21 million; AUS: 4.222 million; ITA: 225,000; SWE: 105,000; DEN: 382,500; SWI: 170,000; BEL: 120,000; MEX: 210,000; NZ: 150,000	80 million
The Black Eyed Peas	United States	1995–present	1998	Hip-hop / pop / R&B	119 million: US: 77.5 million; JPN: 1.25 million; GER: 5.2 million; UK: 14.6 million; FRA: 3.516 million; CAN: 3.1 million; AUS: 3.882 million; BRA: 2.635 million; NLD: 160,000; ITA: 1.9 million; SPA: 890,000; SWE: 350,000; DEN: 226,000; SWI: 540,000; MEX: 1.55 million; BEL: 560,000; AUT: 100,000; POL: 110,000; IRE: 135,000; NZ: 710,000; POR: 104,000	80 million
Van Halen	United States	1978–2020	1978	Rock	65.2 million: US: 57.8 million; JPN: 1.3 million; GER: 1.5 million; UK: 1.18 million; FRA: 400,000; CAN: 2.45 million; AUS: 175,000; BRA: 200,000; NLD: 200,000	80 million
Ayumi Hamasaki	Japan	1998–present	1998	Pop / electronic / world	64.5 million: JPN: 64.5 million	80 million
Tom Petty	United States	1976–2017	1977	Rock	36 million: US: 31.75 million; GER: 500,000; UK: 1.86 million; CAN: 1.7 million; SWE: 200,000	80 million
Johnny Hallyday	France	1957–2017	1960	Rock / pop / world	28.9 million: FRA: 28.17 million; SWI: 268,000; BEL: 540,000	80 million

=== Over 75 million ===
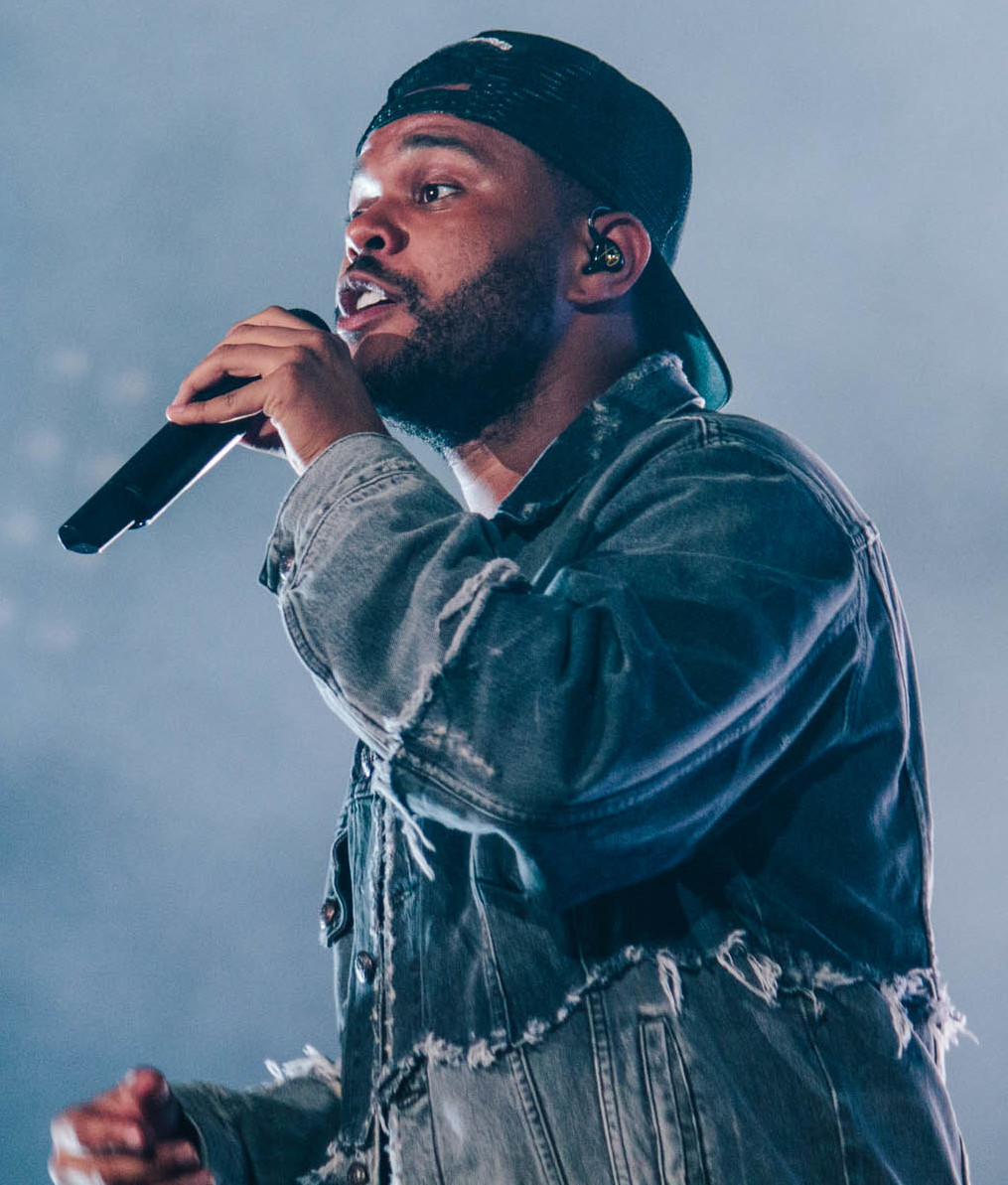
The Weeknd

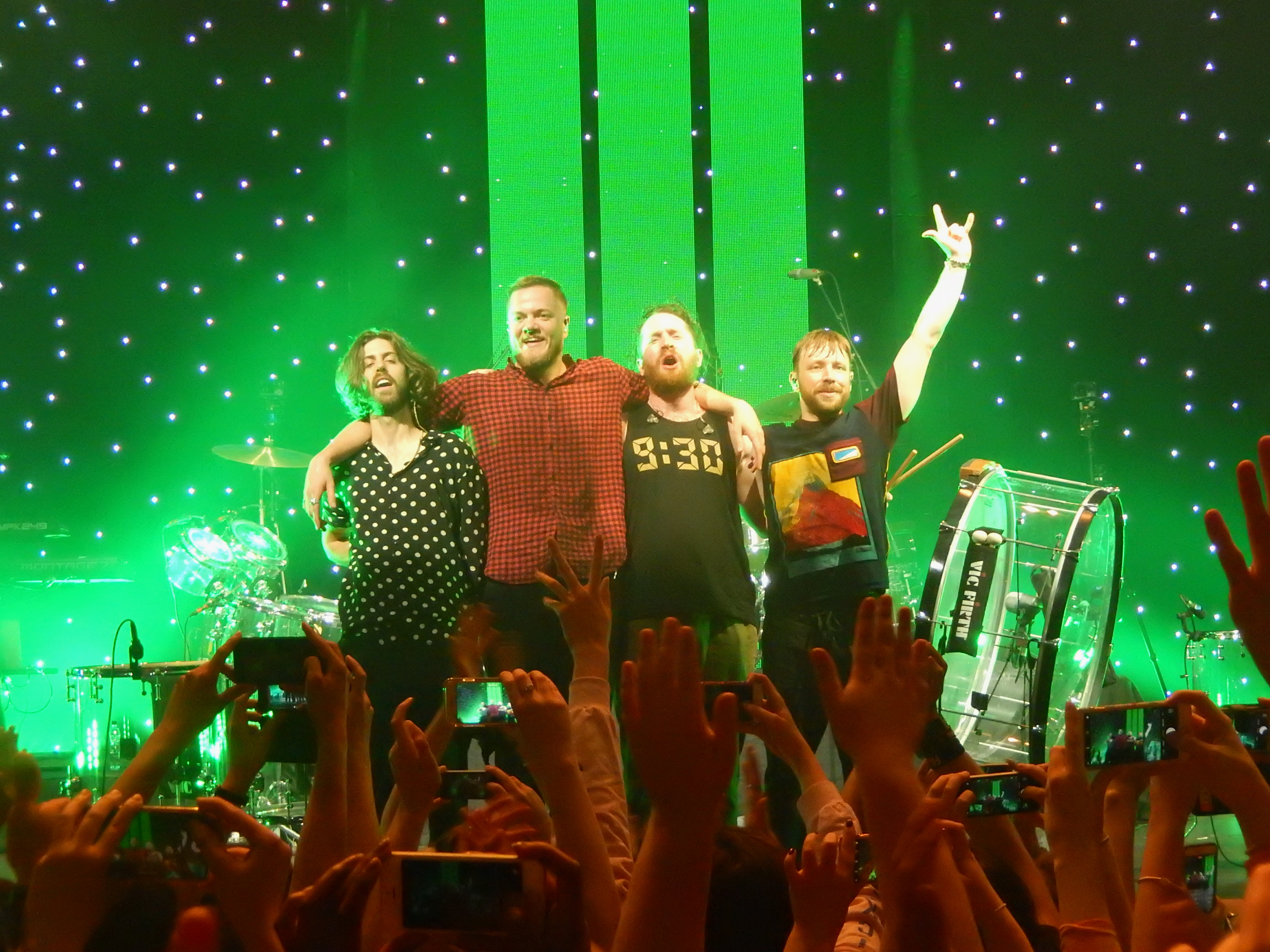
Imagine Dragons

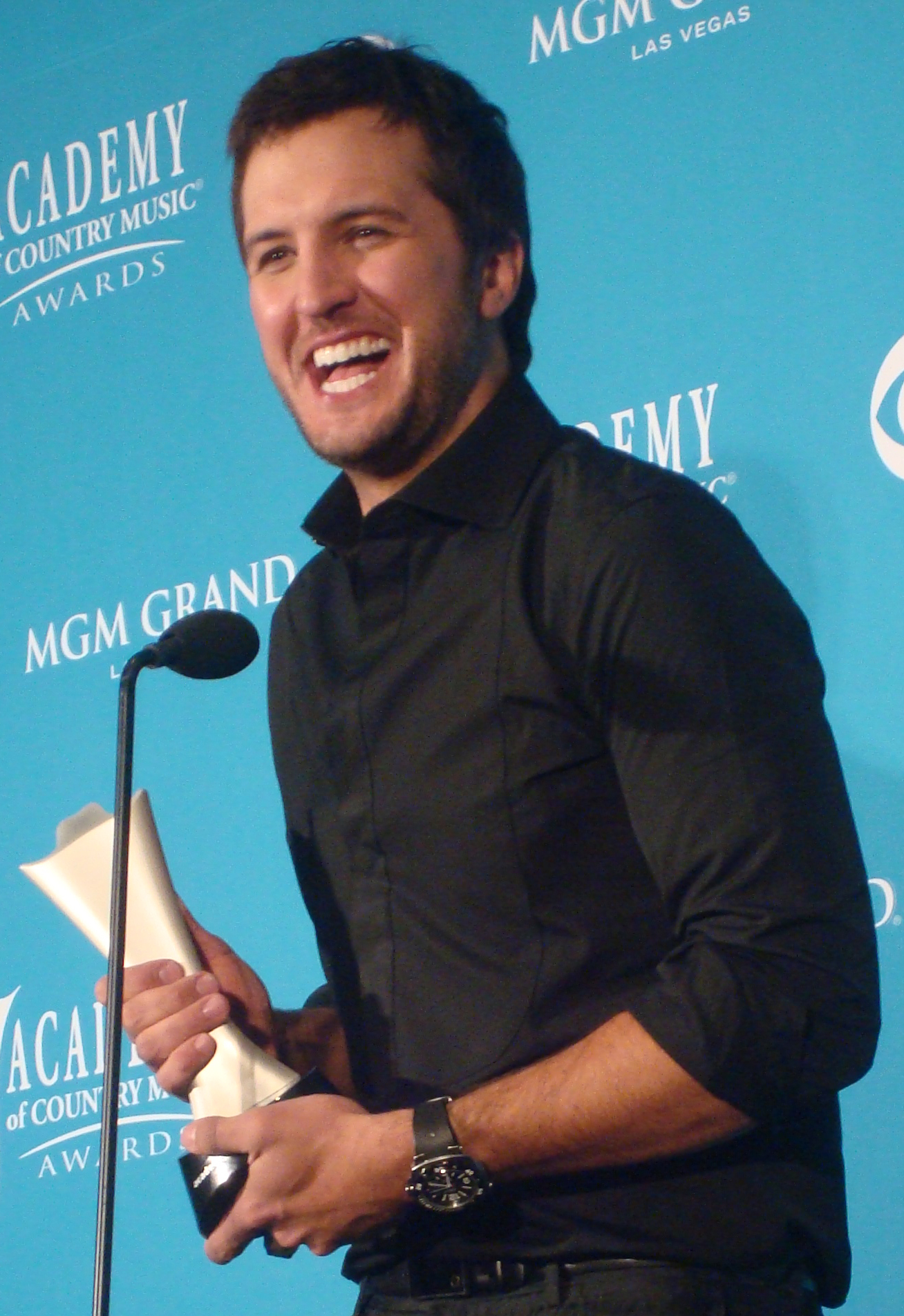
Luke Bryan

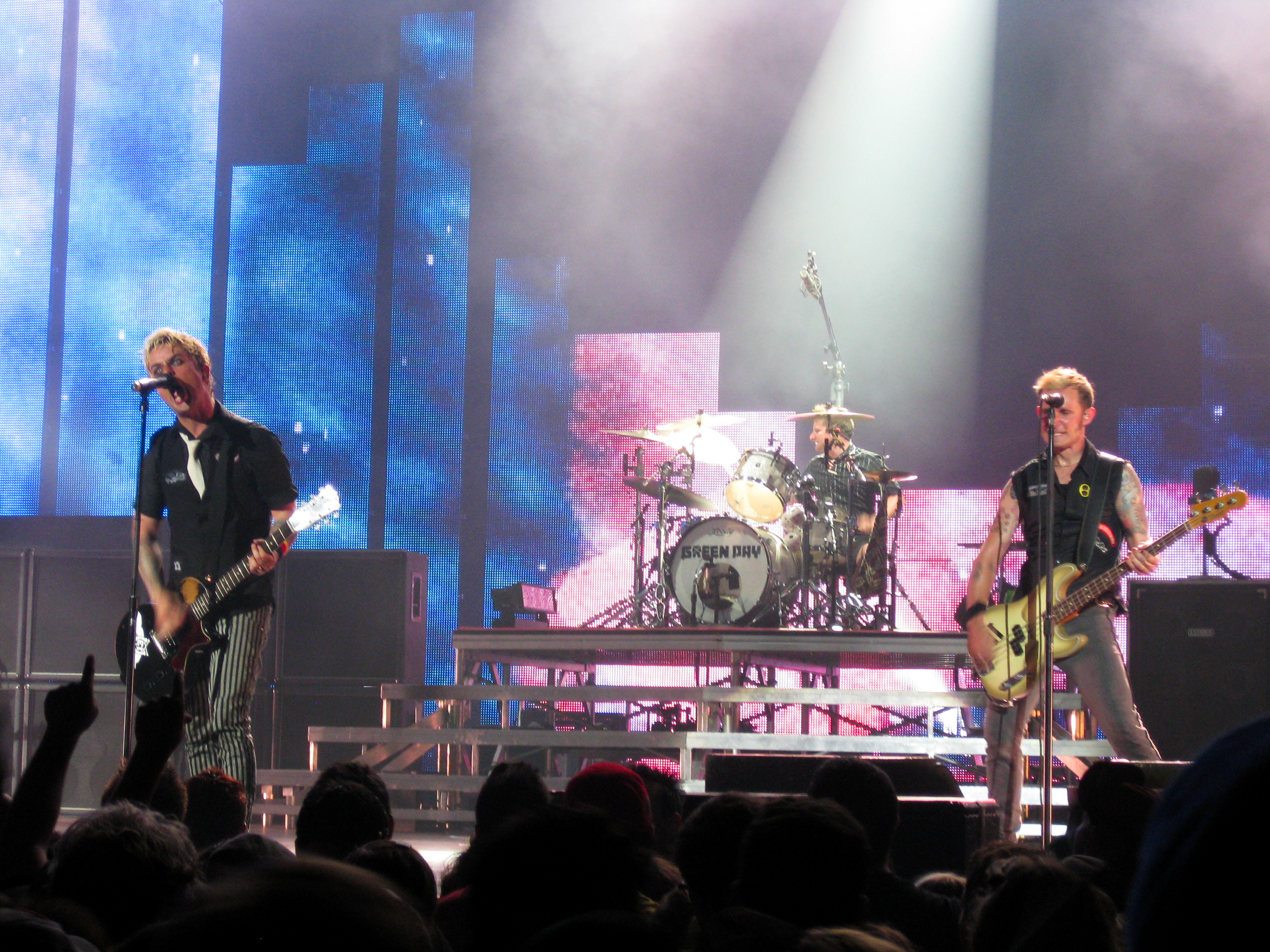
Green Day

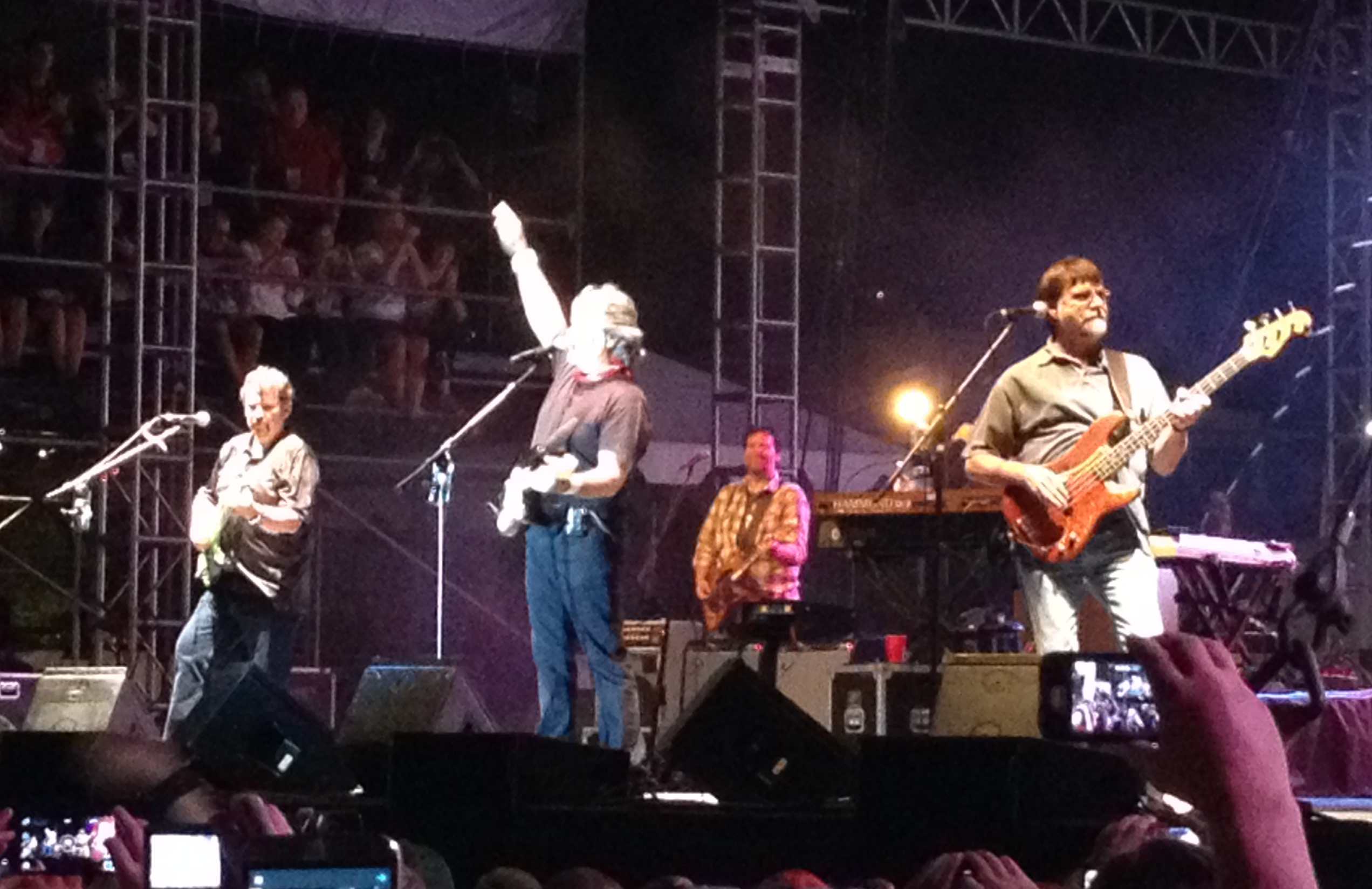
Alabama

Artist	Country	Period active	Release-year of first charted record	Genre	Total certified units (from available markets)	Claimed sales
The Weeknd	Canada	2010–present	2013	R&B / pop	300 million: US: 194.820 million; GER: 5.2 million; UK: 34.560 million; FRA: 3.483 million; CAN: 14.02 million; AUS: 11.99 million; BRA: 11.6 million; ITA: 4.79 million; SPA: 2.27 million; SWE: 2.180 million; NOR: 1.54 million; DEN: 5.15 million; SWI: 100,000; MEX: 1.43 million; BEL: 590,000; AUT: 240,000; POL: 3.26 million; NZ: 2.115 million; POR: 742.500	75 million
Imagine Dragons	United States	2008–present	2012	Rock / pop	186.4 million: US: 131 million; GER: 5.450 million; UK: 22 million; FRA: 3.666 million; CAN: 4.640 million; AUS: 3.150 million; BRA: 7.460 million; ITA: 2.375 million; SPA: 1.650 million; SWE: 1.180 million; NOR: 555,000; DEN: 690,000; MEX: 510,000; BEL: 340,000; AUT: 572,500; POL: 790,000; NZ: 270,000; POR: 140,000	75 million
Luke Bryan	United States	2001–present	2007	Country	108.9 million: US: 106.5 million; UK: 400,000; CAN: 2.040 million	75 million
Tupac Shakur	United States	1991–1996	1991	Hip-hop	67.7 million: US: 52.7 million; GER: 1.750 million; UK: 9.290 million; FRA: 100,000; CAN: 820,000; AUS: 430,000; ITA: 300,000; NLD: 237,200; DEN: 575,000; NZ: 1.570 million	75 million
Nirvana	United States	1987–1994	1990	Rock	95.7 million: US: 61.6 million; JPN: 1.3 million; GER: 3.4 million; UK: 11.27 million; FRA: 2.6 million; CAN: 3.69 million; AUS: 4.302 million; BRA: 935,000; NLD: 250,000; ITA: 885,000; SPA: 860,000; SWE: 380,000; NOR: 125,000; DEN: 550,000; SWI: 190,000; MEX: 475,000; ARG: 522,000; BEL: 675,000; AUT: 230,000; POL: 430,000; NZ: 1 million; POR: 112.500	75 million
Oasis	United Kingdom	1991–2009; 2024–present	1994	Rock	77.2 million: UK: 57.11 million; US: 7.5 million; GER: 1,700 million; CAN: 1.3 million; FRA: 700,000; AUS: 2.36 million; BRA: 1.135 million; SWE: 300,000; DEN: 275,000; MEX: 780,000; SPA: 830,000; ITA: 755,000; JPN: 1.8 million; SWI: 120,000; NZ: 515,000	75 million
Green Day	United States	1987–present	1994	Rock	69.4 million: US: 43.6 million; JPN: 2.3 million; GER: 2 million; UK: 13.710 million; FRA: 500,000; CAN: 2.420 million; AUS: 1.8 million; BRA: 480,000; ITA: 585,000; SPA: 250,000; SWE: 160,000; DEN: 414,000; SWI: 135,000; MEX: 150,000; ARG: 246,000; BEL: 115,000; AUT: 195,000; IRE: 270,000; NZ: 130,000	75 million
Alabama	United States	1972–present	1980	Country / rock	58 million: US: 56.8 million; CAN: 1.2 million	75 million
R. Kelly	United States	1989–2019	1991	R&B / hip-hop / pop	57 million: US: 46.9 million; GER: 1.4 million; UK: 6.720 million; FRA: 825,000; CAN: 300,000; AUS: 140,000; NLD: 365,000; SWI: 100,000; BEL: 275,000	75 million
Robbie Williams	United Kingdom	1990–present	1996	Pop	56.4 million: US: 500,000; GER: 10.575 million; UK: 30.270 million; FRA: 2.695 million; CAN: 250,000; AUS: 2.905 million; NLD: 1.205 million; ITA: 470,000; SPA: 560,000; SWE: 445,000; DEN: 811,500; SWI: 1.018 million; MEX: 1.595 million; ARG: 462,000; BEL: 600,000; AUT: 947,500; POL: 140,000; FIN: 235,743; IRE: 135,000; NZ: 445,000; POR: 280,000	75 million
Bob Seger	United States	1961–present	1967	Rock	55.3 million: US: 52.5 million; UK: 260,000; FRA: 2.6 million; CAN: 2.560 million	75 million
Kenny G	United States	1982–present	1984	Jazz / easy listening	53.9 million: US: 49.6 million; JPN: 700,000; UK: 360,000; CAN: 950,000; AUS: 525,000; BRA: 1.350 million; SPA: 450,000	75 million
Enya	Ireland	1982–present	1987	New-age / world	51.9 million: US: 26.5 million; JPN: 4.6 million; GER: 4.3 million; UK: 6.010 million; FRA: 775,000; CAN: 1.540 million; AUS: 1.680 million; BRA: 1.650 million; NLD: 730,000; SPA: 1.760 million; SWE: 390,000; DEN: 150,000; SWI: 370,000; MEX: 125,000; ARG: 390,000; BEL: 510,000; AUT: 185,000; POL: 120,000; NZ: 135,000	75 million
Bryan Adams	Canada	1979–present	1979	Rock	50.9 million: US: 22 million; JPN: 650,000; GER: 4.450 million; UK: 11.715 million; FRA: 650,000; CAN: 5.120 million; AUS: 2.080 million; BRA: 100,000; NLD: 500,000; SPA: 450,000; SWE: 440,000; NOR: 185,000; DEN: 380,000; SWI: 805,000; BEL: 375,000; AUT: 400,000; POL: 110,000; FIN: 183,444; POR: 286,000	75 million
Bob Marley	Jamaica	1962–1981	1975	Reggae	47.5 million: US: 21.850 million; JPN: 200,000; GER: 1.750 million; UK: 14.840 million; FRA: 4.735 million; CAN: 600,000; AUS: 490,000; NLD: 420,000; ITA: 410,000; SPA: 500,000; SWE: 120,000; DEN: 160,000; SWI: 303,000; ARG: 376,000; BEL: 225,000; AUT: 125,000; NZ: 432,500	75 million
The Police	United Kingdom	1977–1986; 2007–2008	1978	Rock	42.6 million: US: 23.650 million; JPN: 100,000; GER: 1.775 million; UK: 10.660 million; FRA: 3.340 million; CAN: 875,000; AUS: 527,500; BRA: 170,000; NLD: 350,000; ITA: 205,000; SPA: 350,000; SWI: 100,000; MEX: 100,000; ARG: 228,000; BEL: 115,000; NZ: 105,000	75 million
Barry Manilow	United States	1973–present	1973	Pop	36.7 million: US: 33.3 million; UK: 3.225 million; CAN: 400,000	75 million
Kiss	United States	1972–2023	1974	Rock	29.1 million: US: 26 million; JPN: 100,000; GER: 250,000; UK: 1 million; CAN: 1.495 million; AUS: 130,000; NLD: 200,000	75 million
Aretha Franklin	United States	1956–2018	1961	R&B / gospel / jazz / pop	27 million: US: 23.5 million; UK: 3.040 million; FRA: 275,000; CAN: 150,000; ITA: 110,000	75 million

== See also ==
- List of best-selling albums
  - List of best-selling albums by country
- List of best-selling singles
  - List of best-selling singles by country
- Best-selling artists by nationality
  - List of best-selling Belgian music artists
  - List of biggest-selling British music artists
  - List of estimated best-selling Italian music artists
  - List of best-selling Swedish music artists
- Best-selling artists by territory
  - List of best-selling music artists in Brazil
  - List of best-selling music artists in Finland
  - List of highest-certified music artists in Germany
  - List of best-selling music artists in Japan
  - List of best-selling female music artists in the United Kingdom
  - List of highest-certified music artists in the United States
- Best-selling artists by genre
  - List of best-selling Latin music artists
  - List of best-selling boy groups
  - List of best-selling girl groups
  - List of best-selling female rappers
  - List of best-selling gospel music artists
- IFPI Global Recording Artist of the Year
