= Alexandra Burke =

British singer, songwriter, actress (born 1988)

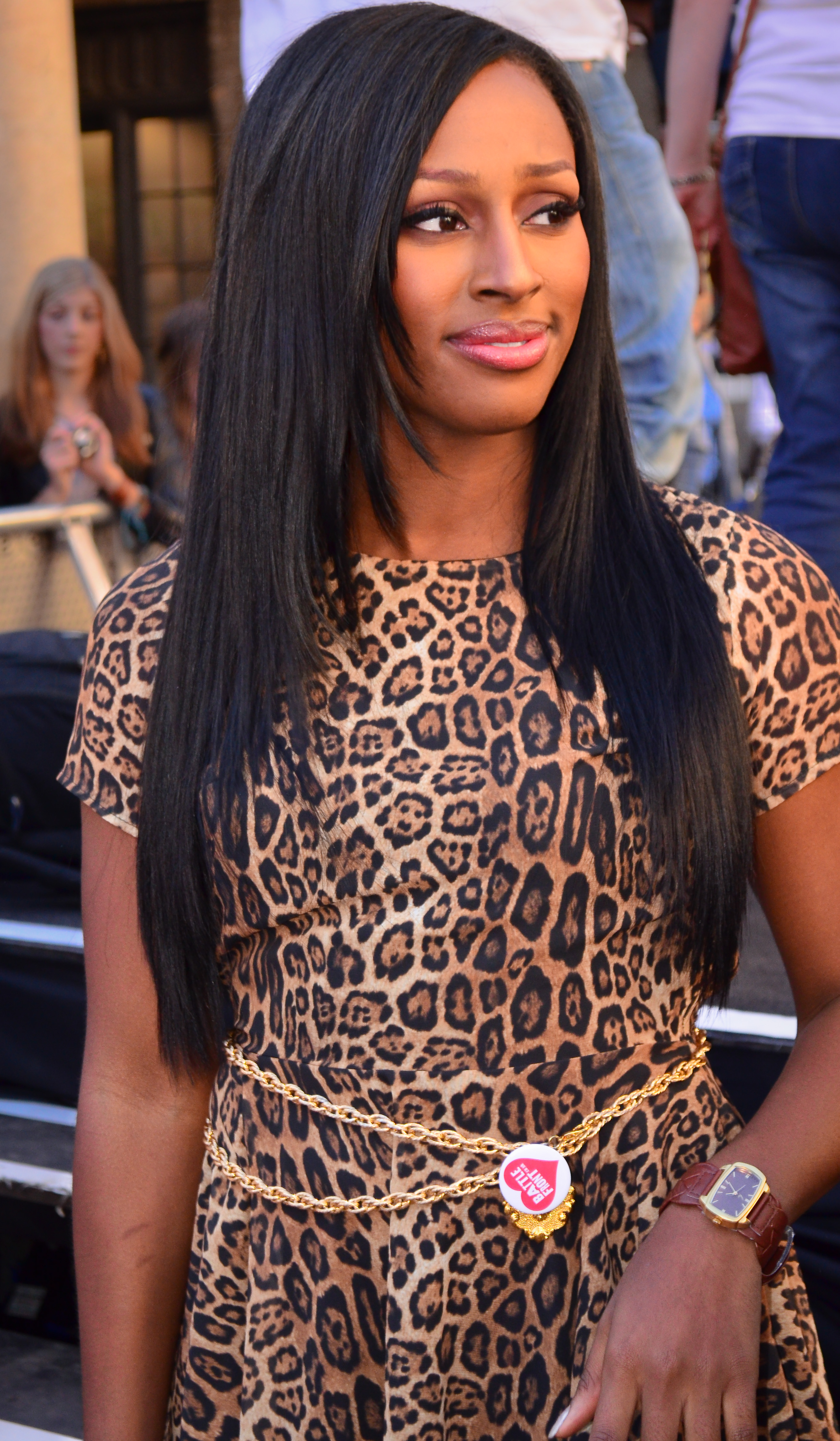
- Burke in October 2011
- Born: Alexandra Imelda Cecelia Ewen Burke; 25 August 1988 (age 38); Islington, London, England
- Works: See discography
- Children: 2
- Mother: Melissa Bell
- Musical career
- Genres: R&B; pop; soul; EDM
- Occupations: Singer; songwriter; actress
- Years active: 2005–present
- Labels: Syco Music; Epic; RCA; Decca
- Website: alexandraburkeofficial.com

Alexandra Imelda Cecelia Ewen Burke (born 25 August 1988) is an English singer, songwriter and actress. She won the fifth series of the talent television show The X Factor in 2008. Following the show, she was signed to Syco Music and released the winner's single "Hallelujah", which became the European record holder for the most singles sold over a period of 24 hours, selling 105,000 in one day, and became the top-selling single of 2008 in the UK and the UK's Christmas 2008 number one.

In 2009, Burke released her debut studio album, Overcome, which debuted at number one on the UK Albums Chart and spawned four number-one singles on the UK Singles Chart and the Irish Singles Chart—"Hallelujah", "Bad Boys", "All Night Long" and "Start Without You". The singles released from the album earned her three BRIT Award nominations. The album also saw the release of the UK top 10 hits, "Broken Heels" and "The Silence". "Elephant" was released in February 2012 as the lead single from Burke's second studio album, Heartbreak on Hold (2012), peaking at number three on the UK Singles Chart. The album's second single, "Let It Go", was released in May 2012 and peaked within the top 40. In 2018, she released her third studio album, The Truth Is, through Universal Music Group's Decca Records, which became her highest peaking album on the UK and Scottish albums charts since 2009, and earned her third consecutive top 10 album on the latter.

In June 2014, Burke replaced Beverley Knight in the lead role of Rachel Marron in the West End musical The Bodyguard, at the Adelphi Theatre, touring with the production in 2015, 2016, 2018 and 2019. In 2016, Burke commenced a 12-month residency in Sister Act the Musical, leading the cast as Deloris Van Cartier. In 2017, she competed in the BBC show Strictly Come Dancing alongside dance partner Gorka Márquez, which they finished as runners-up.

== Life and career ==
=== Early life and career beginnings ===
Alexandra Imelda Cecelia Ewen Burke was born in Islington, London on 25 August 1988, daughter of David Burke (born 1954) and British soul singer Melissa Bell (1964–2017).

Burke shares the middle names Cecelia Ewen with her mother and her sister, Sheneice. Burke said that she had to grow up very fast, at a very young age as her mother was always touring with her band and that she had to look after her young brother, which included taking him to and picking him up from school. Burke's parents separated in 1992, while she was still young, but the pair continued to co-parent their children.

=== 2005–2008: The X Factor ===
Burke auditioned for the second series of The X Factor in 2005 (which was eventually won by Shayne Ward). She made it through to the final seven in Louis Walsh's 16–24 category, effectively the top 21 of the competition, but Walsh did not choose her for his final four as he felt that she was too young. Yet Burke did not give up and went on to seek professional singing lessons over the following three years. Burke's second bid to win The X Factor came in 2008. Falling into the "Girls" category, she was mentored by Girls Aloud's Cheryl who selected her for the finals—a series of ten weekly live shows in which contestants are progressively eliminated by public vote. On the first live show, Burke performed Whitney Houston's classic "I Wanna Dance with Somebody". For the second live show she covered "I'll Be There" by The Jackson 5. In week three, big band week, Burke performed Christina Aguilera's "Candyman" and received her first standing ovation. For the disco-themed fourth live show, Burke performed Donna Summer's "On the Radio". During Mariah Carey week on 8 November, Burke and the other finalists met Carey for individual masterclasses, with Carey complimenting Burke on her voice. Burke performed "Without You" and received a standing ovation from the judges, who all gave her positive feedback. In weeks 6 and 7, Burke received positive comments from the judging panel for her performances of "You are so Beautiful" and Dan Hartman's "Relight My Fire" (the popularity of which in the UK is mostly a result of Take That's 1993 revival thereof). The quarter-final saw her replace Diana Vickers as the bookies' favourite after performing Britney Spears' "Toxic" and Beyoncé' "Listen", for which she received another standing ovation. In the semi-final, Burke performed Rihanna's hit song "Don't Stop the Music" and Toni Braxton hit "Un-Break My Heart".

Burke avoided the final showdown every week and was joined in the grand final by Northern Irish teenager Eoghan Quigg and 4-piece boyband JLS. The three finalists were required to sing three songs – a Christmas song, a duet with an established music artist, and the song from their favourite performance of the series. Her Christmas song was an adaptation of "Silent Night". She then sang "Listen" as a duet with Beyoncé (who later performed her UK number-one single "If I Were a Boy"), and after performing with the American singer she proclaimed: "I have achieved a dream". Her final song before the first-round voting result was "You Are So Beautiful". After the elimination of Quigg, Burke sang what was to become her debut single, a cover of a 1984 song by Leonard Cohen, "Hallelujah", for the first time. Finally, with over eight million votes cast in total, Burke was revealed as the winner of The X Factor 2008 with 58% of the final vote. She performed the single again alongside the other X Factor contestants, and at parts she was too moved to sing. The single went on to become the Christmas number one of 2008, holding the top spot for three weeks and selling one million copies. At this time there was also a campaign to take Jeff Buckley's cover of Hallelujah to the top of the Christmas chart to deny Burke the top spot. The campaign was fuelled by Jeff Buckley fans' dislike of The X Factor's commercialism and the song's arrangement, as well as a desire by this contingent to introduce younger music fans to Buckley's version. Burke herself was not enamoured of the choice of song, and dismissed the original by remarking "It just didn't do anything for me". As winner, Burke received a recording contract with record label Syco, which is co-owned by Sony Music Entertainment. The contract had a stated value of £1 million, of which £150,000 was a cash advance and the remainder allocated to recording and marketing costs.

=== 2009–2010: Overcome, international breakthrough and All Night Long tour ===
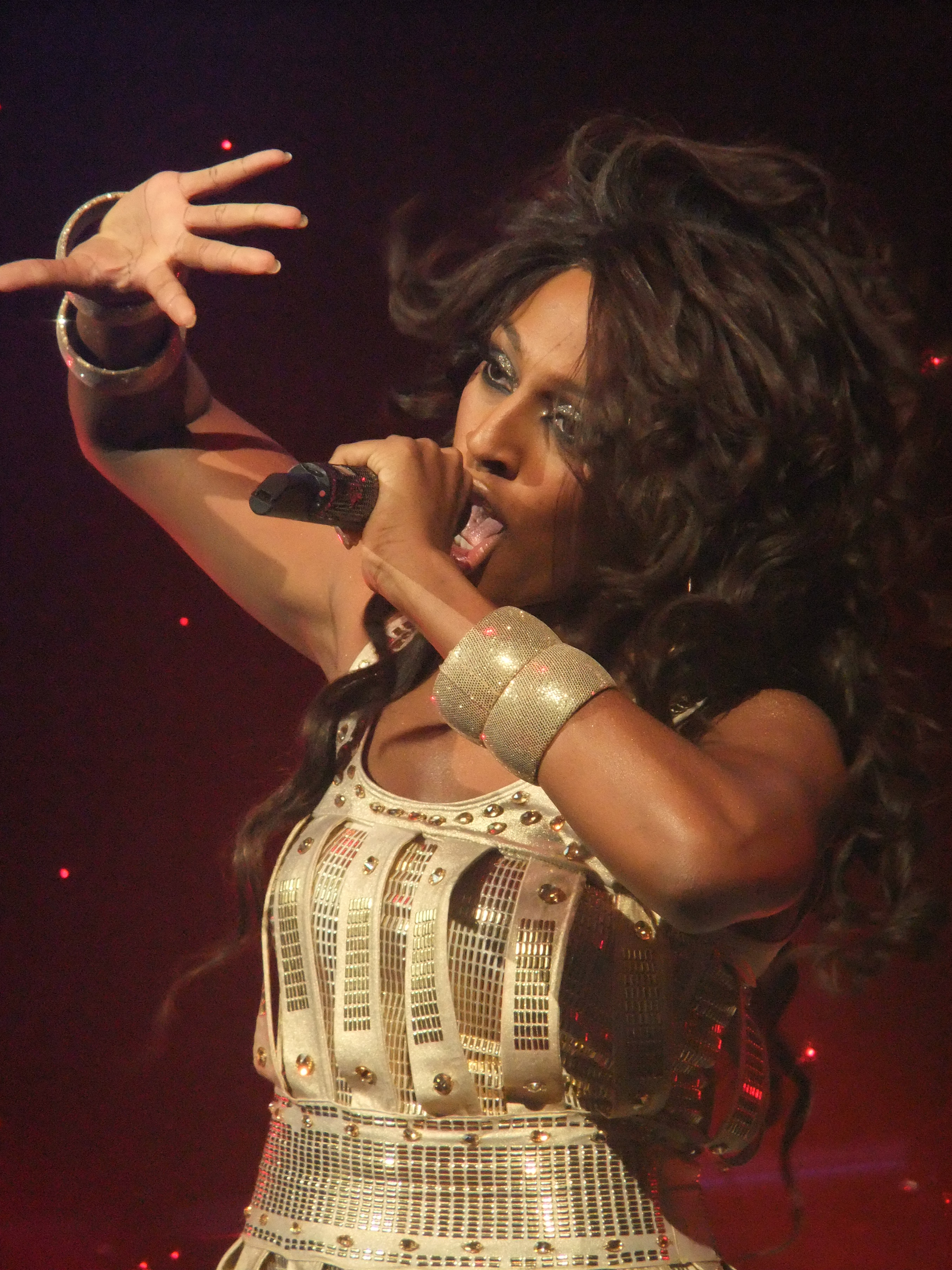
Burke during the All Night Long Tour in 2011

On 13 February 2009 it was reported that Burke signed a £3.5 million, five-album US record deal with Epic Records. Burke's first album was originally scheduled for March 2009, however, Simon Cowell confirmed that her album was scheduled for release later in the year to allow Burke to polish her skills and find the right songs for the album, so that it would not be rushed. The album was released on 19 October 2009 in the UK, titled Overcome. Burke's first commercial single from her debut album is titled "Bad Boys", which features Flo Rida. The single premiered in the UK on The Chris Moyles Show on BBC Radio 1 on 25 August 2009. On 18 October 2009, Bad Boys topped the UK Singles Chart. After visiting Burke in the studio, Beyoncé spoke of possibly recording a duet with her and also asked Burke to join her for the second European leg of her I Am... World Tour. Bad Boys was certified Platinum by the British Phonographic Industry on 7 January 2010.

On 19 July 2009, Burke confirmed that she had signed a six-figure contract with Italian fashion designers Dolce & Gabbana, to become the face of a new fashion line. She would also model their clothes and accessories in her music videos. Burke performed on the Royal Variety Show on 7 December 2009.

Burke confirmed on 17 November 2009 that "Broken Heels" would be the second commercial and third overall single from Overcome. She also confirmed via her official Twitter page that the video was shot in Los Angeles on 22 and 23 November 2009. On 18 January 2010, Burke began her European Promo Tour in Brussels, Belgium. On 12 March 2010, Burke confirmed on Twitter that "All Night Long" would be her new single, featuring Pitbull. She appeared on Dancing on Ice during the semi-final to perform All Night Long. On 29 April 2010, Burke entered FHM's poll for the world's top 100 sexiest women 2010 at number 75. This was her first appearance on the poll since she rose to fame in 2008. Burke's next single was a completely new song, "Start Without You", which was released on 5 September 2010. The video for "Start Without You" debuted on 19 August through VEVO on later premiered on The BOX. The song was performed at T4 on the Beach on 4 July 2010, and later released internationally.

Additionally, Burke was announced as the first ever brand ambassador for Sure Women, starring in a television advertisement for the company. Burke achieved her fifth consecutive top ten hit, and her third number one single, when "Start Without You" stormed to the top of the charts, beating Katy Perry to the top spot. The re-packaged edition of Overcome is to be released of 29 November 2010. Music Week reports that the deluxe makeover includes three brand new tracks; "Perfect", "Before the Rain" and "What Happens on the Dancefloor" featuring Cobra Starship; as well as three number one and two Top 10 singles (including "Start Without You"). A DVD accompanying the release features seven videos, including an exclusive promo for the track "The Silence". The magazine also confirmed that Burke would promote the record with a performance on The X Factor. A new track on the album was said to be a duet with "an amazing group", the group was later announced as Cobra Starship. On 25 October, Burke announced via her Twitter that a new version of "The Silence" will be the album's fifth commercial single being released in early December. The official music video for "The Silence" was released on 27 October 2010, via MSN Videos UK. It was confirmed that there would be no further singles from the album after "The Silence".

=== 2010–2012: New record deal and Heartbreak on Hold ===
It's got to be sexy. So I'm going to get a lot fiercer and sexier. We're just getting down and dirty with the next album. I'm going to take a lot more risks and it's going to be insane." She also hinted at any collaborations on the LP, "I can't say too much because my management will kill me if I let loose. But I have a special duet planned. I have the ideas, the collaborations in my mind – it's all locked up in my head.

— Alexandra Burke

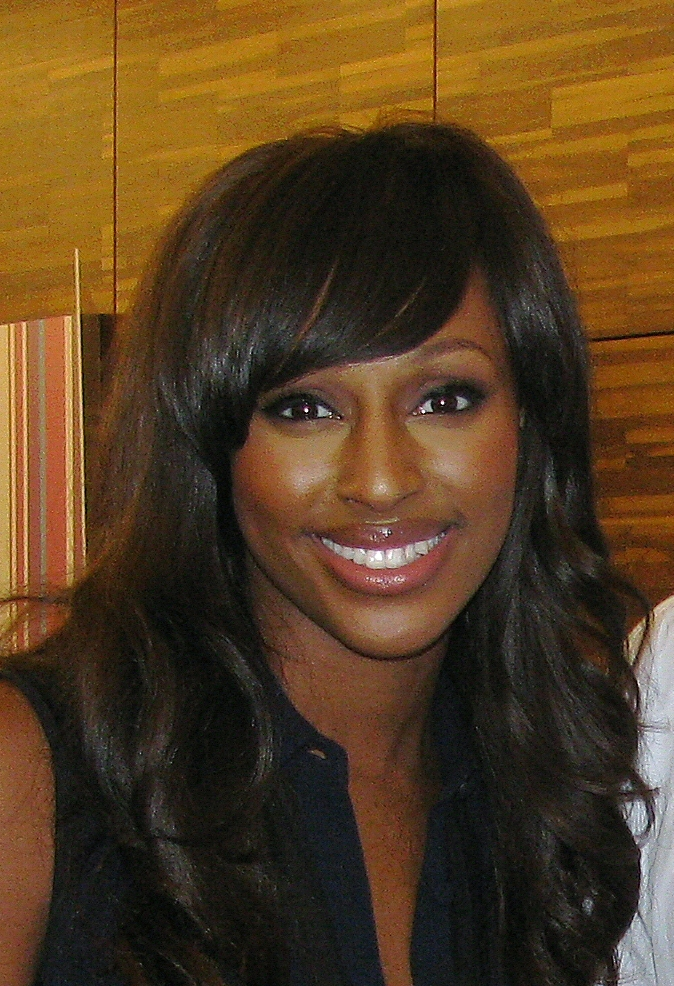
Alexandra Burke in 2011.

Burke stated that her next album would get "down, raunchy and dirty", promising the record would take risks. Burke took a break from recording so that she could embark on her first headline concert tour, the All Night Long Tour and said she would continue recording two days after the tour ends. She worked with RedOne for a lot of the album, but also reunited with Bruno Mars, StarGate, Rico Love, Autumn Rowe and Ne-Yo, among others. Burke stated that she had recorded a duet, with an "amazing" artist. She said that she was working in the studio with songwriter Autumn Rowe, and that their duet had just "happened". Burke featured on Swizz Beatz new album, Haute Living on the track "Show Off". In June it was reported that Burke had signed a record deal with RCA Records and the album will be jointly handled by the Syco and RCA Records. The album will be released in the United States after she signed a £3 million record deal with Epic Records. It was thought that Burke's album would be released just under RCA; however, she said that the album would be jointly handled by RCA and SyCo. Burke said that she went to "writing camp" while she was in Los Angeles. She said that it is when many songwriters and music producers flew in to work with her. She also said that she wrote two or three songs a day for a couple of weeks.

Since April 2011, Burke has supported T4's Battlefront show, helping young campaigners Hope and Abby raise awareness about the organ donor register for their Sign Up, Speak Up, Save Lives project. In October 2011, Burke joined Gary Barlow, Louis Walsh and Tulisa Contostavlos on the judging panel as an extra judge during the fourth week of the live shows in series 8 when Kelly Rowland had a throat infection. Burke's lead single from the album titled "Elephant", which is produced by Erick Morillo, was released on 11 March 2012. It debuted and peaked at number-three on the UK Singles Chart. The second single from the album, "Let it Go", premièred on Kiss Radio on 13 April 2012. She announced in mid-April 2012 that her second studio album's title would be Heartbreak on Hold which was released on 4 June 2012. On 18 April 2012, she was confirmed for T4 on the Beach 2012. In February 2012, it was reported that Burke had left the Syco label to join RCA Records. In June 2012, Burke parted company with her management company.

=== 2012–2014: Renegade, U.S. launch and other projects ===
In September 2012, it was revealed that Burke would take part in Les Misérables for Children in Need. Burke later announced that she was working on an album for a US release. Again in October 2012, Burke revealed that she was working on a follow-up album to Heartbreak on Hold, which would be released in 2013. On 3 November, she performed "All The Lights" at MAMA Awards with Zico, leader of the k-pop group Block B, as part of a special stage from H-Artistry in Malaysia . Burke said she wanted to go back to her original sound which was featured on her debut album, Overcome. She told fans to expect "R&B bangers" on her third album. Simon Cowell asked Burke to record a version of "Live and Let Die" in order to use throughout the live shows of The X Factor USA, when the judges are announced and walk out. In December 2012, Burke released her first holiday extended play, Christmas Gift, which consisted a cover of "Silent Night" and a new track titled "Christmas Time".

On 10 February 2013, it was revealed that Burke was recording two new songs a night for her third album and aimed to have around 60 in total to choose from. She also revealed that she was recording the album in the United States and at her home studio; "I've actually built a studio in my house, downstairs, I'm literally in it every day, recording, I'm flying to the states a lot, I've been in Los Angeles and New York a lot, and if the producers can't fly to me, I fly to them." On 13 February, she explained that her third album would focus on live instruments and would channel Soul music. On the same day, she revealed that she was taking acting classes and had hopes to pursue a career in films, musicals, theater. On 25 March 2013, it was announced that Burke would perform a concert version of Lady Sings the Blues at the Royal Albert Hall between 4 and 8 June in the venue's Elgar Room but the shows were postponed. The concerts sold out in under a week. In May 2013, it was reported that Burke signed a deal with a US management company after impressing former Def Jam president Kevin Liles during a meeting with him in New York. In June 2013, Burke parted ways with her record label, RCA, over "differing views" between herself and the label regarding her third studio album.

Burke made her U.S. performance debut at Apollo Theater on 10 June 2013 as part of the line-up for The Apollo Theater Legends Hall of Fame 2013, honouring the induction of Chaka Khan. Burke shared the stage with other artists including Mary J. Blige, Patti LaBelle, and Jennifer Holliday. On 30 August, Burke released her second EP, #NewRules. The EP contains 5 tracks, including a cover of Coldplay's "Fix You". On 20 November, Burke revealed that the lead single from her upcoming third record had been decided and a video was to be shot in the coming weeks. She previewed two new songs on her Facebook page on Christmas.

On 5 January 2015, Burke announced that she would be releasing an EP in March called Renegade. She said: "This EP is extremely close to my heart. It marks what is set to be a new chapter for me both personally and artistically. I have worked extremely hard on this, there has been laughter, tears and sweat. Renegade touches upon themes and experiences that I have never spoken out about before. Since the last album, a lot has changed in my life, but most importantly I have changed. I'm in a great place, healthier and stronger than ever. I feel as an artist its important for one's music to grow with them. I'm now twenty-six and having taken time out of the musical ring, I now have the gloves firmly back on."

=== 2014–2017: Musical theatre and Strictly Come Dancing ===
Burke made her West End debut on 2 June 2014 as a leading cast member in the £5 million production of The Bodyguard at London's Adelphi Theatre, taking over the lead role from Beverley Knight. Based on the 1992 movie of the same name and made famous by Whitney Houston, Burke played Rachel Marron – a superstar receiving threats from a lovestruck obsessed fan, who falls in love with the new bodyguard hired to protect her. Burke was approached to play the role two years prior to her 2014 debut, but due to scheduling commitments was forced to turn down the opportunity. Two years later Alexandra was again invited to audition for the role and was subsequently offered the part.

Burke played the role for a relatively short period until the production closed at the Adelphi Theatre on 29 August 2014. Although The Bodyguard was one of London's most successful and popular shows at the time, it was forced to close as it had reached the end of its contract with the theatre, which had already booked a new production to take residency. Later in the year Burke was nominated for 'Best West End Debut' at the West End Frame Awards 2014.

In early 2014, prior to Burke joining the West End cast, it was announced the production would tour the UK and Ireland from February 2015, with the cast yet to be confirmed. Shortly after the production closed it was announced, in October 2014, that Burke would reprise her role as Rachel Marron in the nationwide tour, kicking off her year-and-a-half residency in the show on 12 February 2015 at the Southampton Mayflower Theatre. Burke was a contracted cast member of The Bodyguard until the end of June 2016, with her final UK performance in the production taking place at the Congress Theatre in Eastbourne. The production and cast briefly transferred to an international stage in Monaco, playing four nights at the Grimaldi Forum, with Burke's final ever Bodyguard performance after two years leading the production taking place on 26 June.

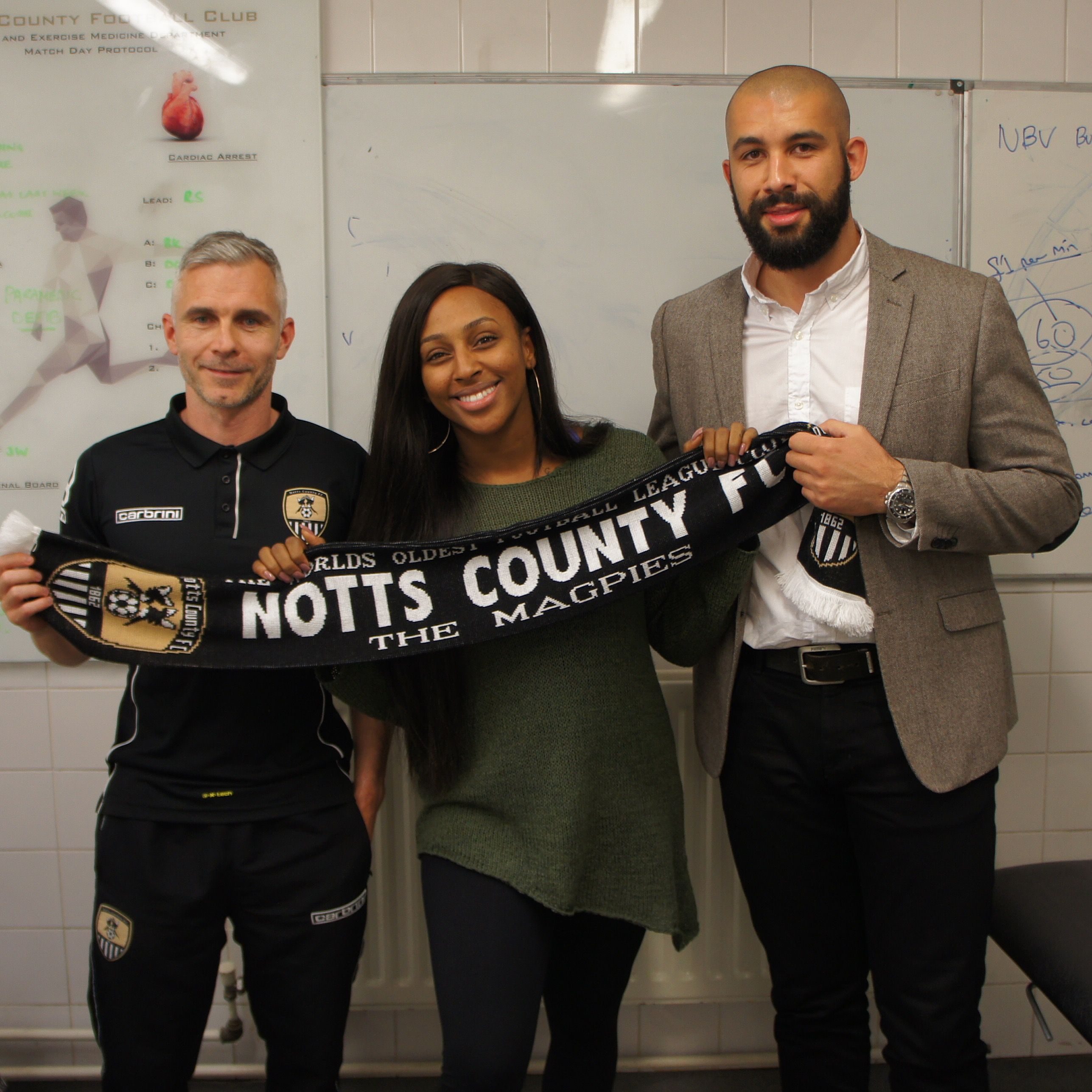
Alexandra Burke (middle) in 2016

An original cast recording featuring Burke was released in June 2015 to accompany the nationwide tour.

It was announced on 8 January 2016 that Burke would be taking over the lead role of Deloris Van Cartier in an all-new UK touring production of Sister Act: The Musical. Directed and choreographed by Craig Revel Horwood. Burke commenced a year long residency in the show, making her debut on 30 July 2016 at the Curve Theatre Leicester. Alexandra's final performance in the critically acclaimed production took place on 27 August 2017 at Wintergardens, Blackpool. On 21 August 2017, Burke was announced as a contestant for the fifteenth series of Strictly Come Dancing. She was partnered with professional dancer Gorka Márquez. and made it to the final, in which she was beaten by Joe McFadden. She broke the record for most 10s in the history of the show, with 32.

=== Strictly Come Dancing scores ===
Week #	Dance / Song	Judges' scores					Result
Week #	Dance / Song	Horwood	Bussell	Ballas	Tonioli	Total	Result
1	Waltz / "(You Make Me Feel Like) A Natural Woman"	5	6	6	7	24	No elimination
2	Paso doble / "On the Floor"	9	9	9	9	36	Safe
3	American Smooth / "Wouldn't It Be Loverly"	8	8	8	9	33	Safe
4	Jive / "Proud Mary"	9	10	10	10	39	Safe
5	Samba / "Shape of You"	7	8	8	-	23	Safe
6	Tango / "Maneater"	9	9	9	8	35	Safe
7	Cha-cha-cha / "I've Got the Music in Me"	9	10	10	10	39	Safe
8	Argentine tango / "Mi Confesión"	9	9	10	10	38	Safe
9	Quickstep / "The Gold Diggers' Song (We're in the Money)"	9	10	10	10	39	Safe
10	Rumba / "Halo"	7	8	8	9	32	Bottom two
11	Charleston / "Supercalifragilisticexpialidocious"	9	10	10	10	39	Bottom two
12	Viennese waltz / "Everybody Hurts"; Salsa / "Finally"	9; 10	10; 10	10; 10	10; 10	39; 40	Safe
13	American Smooth / "Wouldn't It Be Loverly"; Freestyle / "There's No Business Like Show Business"; Jive / "Proud Mary"	10; 9; 10	10; 10; 10	10; 10; 10	10; 10; 10	40; 39; 40	Runner-up

=== 2018–present: The Truth Is, return to musical theatre and pantomime debut ===
On 22 December 2017, it was announced that Burke had signed with Universal Music Group's Decca Records for her third record, The Truth Is, which was released on 16 March 2018. The album's lead single, "Shadow", was released on 23 February 2018. Burke then announced her first full UK and Ireland tour in seven years; encompassing 13 venues, would commence in Southend on 1 September 2018, but this was cancelled in June.

In February 2018, it was formally announced that Burke would be returning to musical theatre, starring in the first West End revival production of Chess since 1986. Burke played Svetlana, in a role made famous by Barbara Dickson in the 1980s. The production ran for five weeks at London's Coliseum Theatre, and saw Burke playing opposite theatre icon Michael Ball. The opening night was on 26 April 2018. In July 2018, it was announced Burke would guest star as Roxie Hart in the London West End production of Chicago for an eight-week run.

In 2019, Burke reprised her role as Rachel Marron in a worldwide touring production of The Bodyguard which finished in late 2019.

From 12 July 2021, Burke played the Narrator in the West End revival of Joseph and the Amazing Technicolor Dreamcoat at the London Palladium opposite Jason Donovan as Pharaoh and Jac Yarrow as Joseph until 5 September 2021.

It was announced Burke was due to star as Julianne Potter in My Best Friend's Wedding The Musical based on the 1997 film beginning September 2021 on a UK and Ireland tour (originally September 2020 but postponed due to the COVID-19 pandemic). It was announced this was cancelled due to the impact of the COVID-19 pandemic.

In June 2021, it was announced that Burke will star in a movie with her character inspired from Tina Turner.

In October 2021, Burke shared a snippet of new music on social media, with the words "new music?" along with a pair of suspicious emojis.

In February 2022, Burke revealed she was pregnant with her first child.

In late April 2022, it was revealed Burke would be playing the role of Mrs Blunderbore in the latest London Palladium pantomime, Jack and the Beanstalk, from 10 December 2022 to 15 January 2023.

In 2023, Burke co-starred in the film Pretty Red Dress, directed by Dionne Edwards.

== Artistry ==
=== Music and voice ===
"Start Without You"
The song incorporates reggae fusion and dancehall, featuring the line "drip drop it way down low."

Burke's music is contemporary R&B, and also features soul and pop in certain songs. Burke's vocal range has been compared to those of American singers Christina Aguilera, Lady Gaga, Whitney Houston and Beyoncé.

Since winning The X Factor, signing a record deal with Syco Music and recording her debut album Overcome, Burke has been heavily involved in creating the music she records and releases. She said about being involved with the album's music: "I said to my manager I want my music to be fun, to be uplifting and to be bold. I want it to reflect my personality. I want it to be in your face, I want it to be a beast. I want it to be energetic and fun. When I record the ballads I want to cry. And if I go through a roller coaster recording this album then I want the listener to go through a roller coaster when they hear it." During her first studio album, the genre ranged from heavy R&B songs to dance-pop tracks, after she collaborated with dance production team RedOne, as well as working with Stargate and Ne-Yo. Burke labelled her first album as "very Americanised".

"The Silence", Burke's sixth single from Overcome was an emotional R&B ballad inspired by her aunt's relationship with her boyfriend. She said: "My auntie was going through that situation and she came over to Los Angeles to spend some time with me and get away from her fella, etc. And she was telling me about her situation and [...] why does he let the silence do the talking? Why doesn't he let you know how he feels? And then this song came about". Burke said that her voice will give the tracks soul, but the music is pop and R&B. Although Burke did not have any writing credits on her first album, during the production of her second studio album, Heartbreak on Hold she went to writing camp with many Americans. Burke has received co-writing credits on a number of songs on her second album. She said that she was going to get "down and dirty", "sexier", and a lot "fiercer". Burke also announced she wanted to take more risks on the second LP and that she was going to go "insane" on Heartbreak on Hold. On her second album, Burke's album features electropop, R&B and electro house. She was the executive producer on her second album and said that "what [she says, goes]" but that she still takes advice from her management.

=== Influences ===
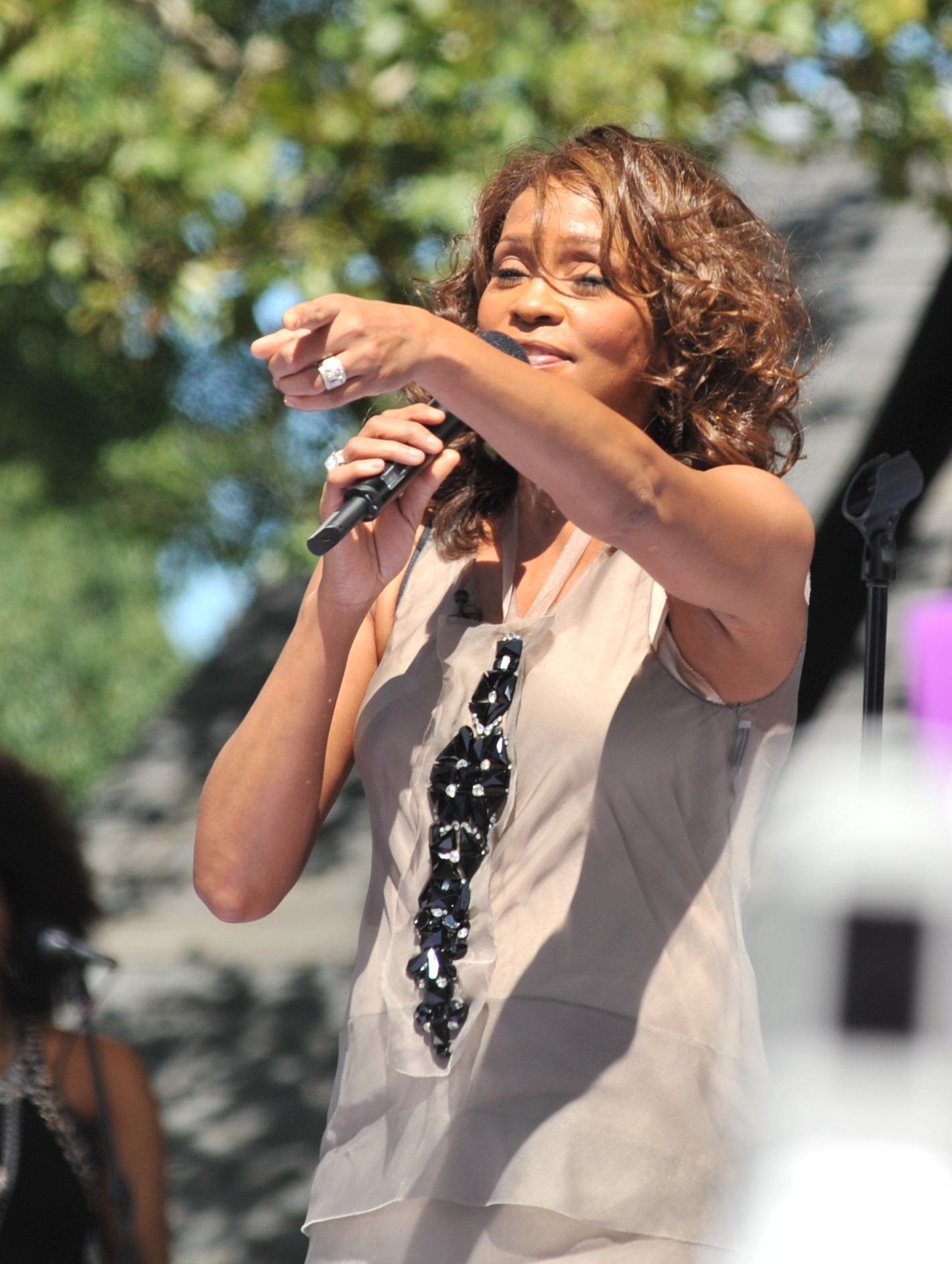
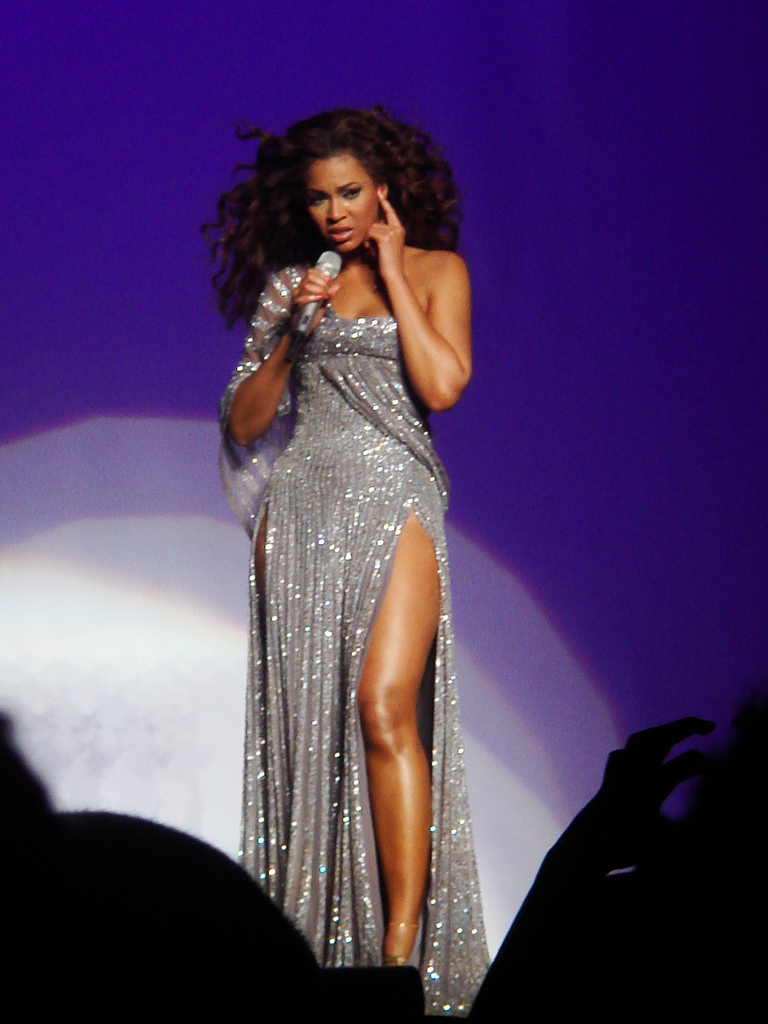
American entertainers Whitney Houston (left) and Beyoncé (right) are two of Burke's biggest influences in music.

Burke's known influences in music include American entertainers Beyoncé, Michael Jackson, Mariah Carey, Aretha Franklin, Kelly Rowland, and Whitney Houston. Burke has also listed American singer-songwriters Alicia Keys, John Legend and Mary J. Blige as inspirations in music. Burke performed with Beyoncé during the final of series 5 of The X Factor. Burke introduced Beyoncé by saying:

Ladies and Gentlemen, I absolutely cannot believe I'm about to introduce this woman to the stage, please welcome, my hero, Beyoncé.

Beyoncé later described Burke as a "superstar" and a "beautiful young lady" with a "beautiful voice", as well as saying that was proud to have sung with Burke. Burke later said that performing with Beyoncé made her "dreams come true". Beyoncé later announced her tour, I Am... World Tour and said that she hoped to see Burke again. Beyoncé later invited Burke to perform on her tour in May 2009, which Burke did. Simon Cowell called the duet "one of the most memorable moments in the history of The X Factor. Burke later said her All Night Long Tour was influenced and inspired by Beyoncé and Michael Jackson. After Beyoncé visited Burke in the studio, she spoke of possibly recording a duet with her. In February 2011, Burke said that she took inspiration and influence from Robin S., Donna Summer and her mother's band, Soul II Soul on her second LP. Swizz Beatz is a known fan of Burke's music. He invited Burke to perform on the track Show Off for his second studio album, Haute Living.

== Other ventures ==
=== Fashion lines ===
In 2010, it was reported that Burke and JLS who came second to Burke during The X Factor were in talks to release a clothing line together. JLS and Burke said that they have wanted to release a clothing line since before they were famous. The pair have been using ideas and inspiration which they have collected together over the years. It was later reported that the company would be called 2KX and the company would sell a range of men and women's clothing which could be worn casually during the day or for a dressed up night out. With the clothing range being sold exclusively at branches of USC around the United Kingdom and Ireland. 2KX was released in Spring 2011 during a heat wave in the United Kingdom which raised sales of the company. In order to promote the company, both artists began wearing the clothing at gigs performances, music videos as well as Facebook page opening for the company, an official website launch and YouTube ads. JLS wore the clothes in their music video for "Love You More".

Burke later signed a modelling contract with IMG Models. Burke and JLS took part in a photoshoot wearing the clothing to promote the range. In one of the images the group poses in underwear. Another image shows them in clothing ranges which would be included in the Spring Collection. The company will accommodate for men and women, with JLS designing for the men and Burke designing for the women. The company will reflect their personal styles and their love for fashion. It was reported that the Underwear Collection would launch in March 2011, and their Clothing Collection would be released the following month. The underwear which went on sale in March 2011, price ranged between £15 – £19 Burke said that they wanted the clothes to retail at a "reasonable price" that people would be able to afford. Burke was praised for her dresses and for bringing her own style to the fashion line. Burke and JLS decided to release a t-shirt from the company almost five months before the company was due to launch, in order to raise money for Capital FM's Help a Capital Child charity campaign. The aim was to raise £10,000 for charity by 1 January 2011. The t-shirts were priced at £15 with £1.50 from each sold T-shirt going to the charity. The company did reach their funding target. The company name, 2KX, refers to "2010", the year in which Burke and JLS founded the company and launched the label officially. 2K is the abbreviation for the year "2000" and "X" is the Roman numeral for 10. The company is based London.

=== Reality television ===
Burke first appeared on reality television in 2001, when she took part in the second series of Star for a Night. She became the runner-up of the series, behind Joss Stone. She went on to audition for the second series of The X Factor in 2005, where she made it to judges houses before her mentor Louis Walsh decided she was too young to continue in the competition. She returned to The X Factor for its fifth series in 2008, where she went on to win the competition with 58% of the public vote. In 2010, she was a guest judge on the British version of So You Think You Can Dance, during the auditions and choreography camp stages. She also appeared as a guest judge during the fourth week of the eighth series of The X Factor.

Burke was one of the last ever celebrity contestants to appear on Who Wants to Be a Millionaire? before the show ended in February 2014.

She is also a Manchester United fan, having appeared on MUTV.

In August 2017, Burke was announced as a contestant on the fifteenth series of Strictly Come Dancing. She was partnered with professional dancer Gorka Márquez. On 16 December, Burke and Márquez reached the finals of the competition, and finished in joint second place.

=== Philanthropy ===
From a young age Burke has supported a number of charities around the United Kingdom. Before Burke auditioned for The X Factor and attained a successful music career, she went on tour with Young Voices. Burke performed in large venues such as the Royal Albert Hall before she became famous. Burke went on tour with her mother's band, Soul II Soul where Burke sang to raise money for charity. Burke's mother, Melissa Bell, said that herself and Burke only do professional gigs together for charity. In 2008, while Burke was a contestant on The X Factor she and her fellow series five contestants released a cover of Mariah Carey's "Hero" for the Help for Heroes and The Royal British Legion charities. The release was backed by, and originally suggested by, The Sun newspaper.

On 30 October 2008 it was announced that British Chancellor of the Exchequer Alistair Darling would waive all tax on copies sold on the single. He said:

I support the efforts being made by the X Factor contestants and in recognition of that I'm proposing effectively to waive the VAT on the sale of these singles. We will do that by making a donation equivalent to the value of the VAT.

Simon Cowell ordered the song to have a big promotional push to get it to the top of the UK Singles Chart, and the contestants performed the song live on The X Factor and again with Carey herself. On 2 November 2008 it debuted at number one on the UK Singles Chart, staying there for three consecutive weeks and becoming the fastest selling single of 2008. The song sold 100,000 copies in the first day of its release and 313,244 copies by the end of the week. It sold over 770,000 copies and raised over one million pounds for Help For Heroes foundation. Many shops had to order additional copies of the single due to high demand." It was listed as the second biggest single of 2008 and the nineteenth best selling single of the decade. The single sold 1.2 million copies within the UK getting certificated double platinum.

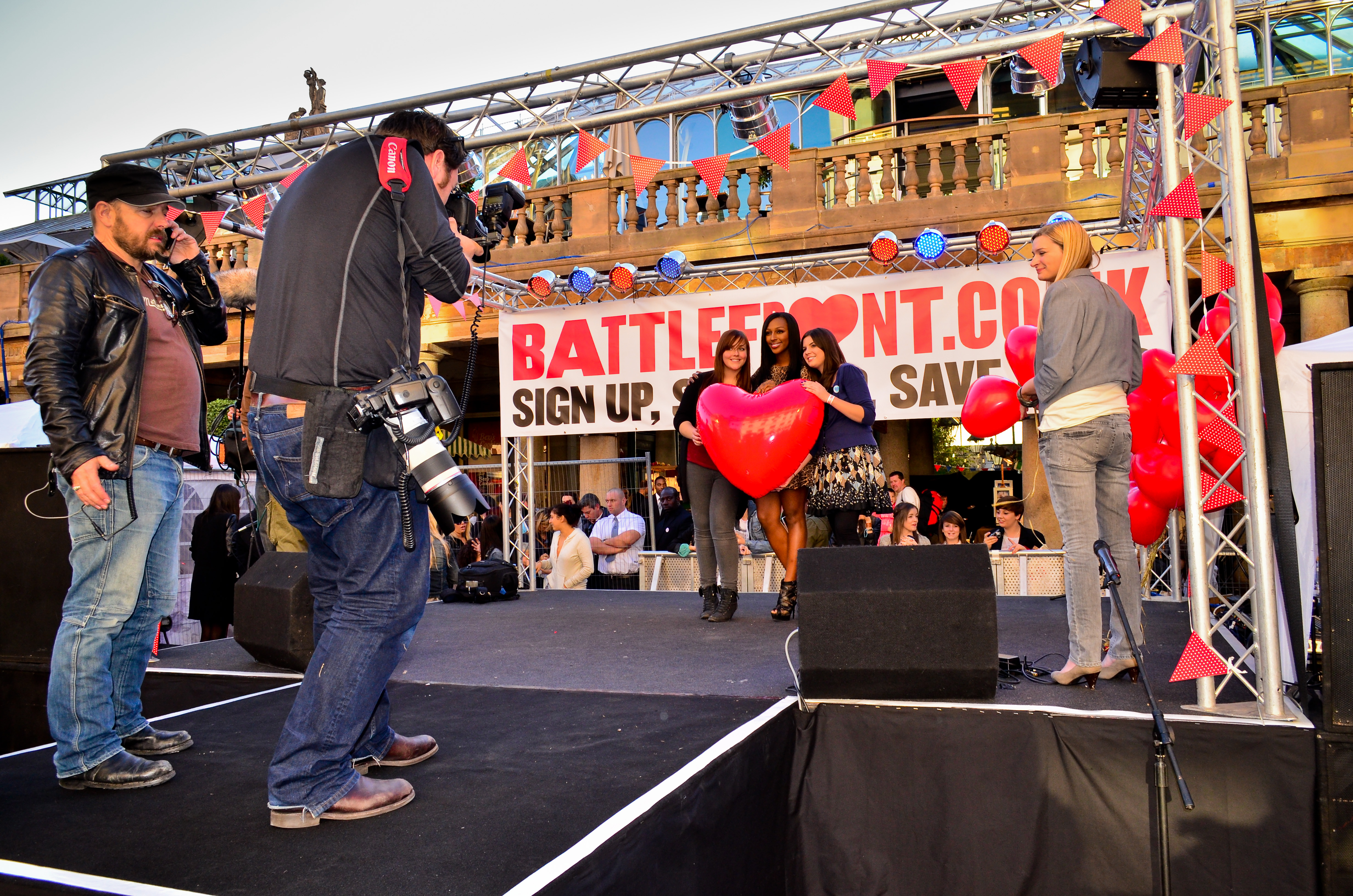
Burke broke records for getting people to sign up to donate an organ within an hour.

Following the 2010 Haiti earthquake, many celebrities, including Burke, wanted to help the suffering people of the country. British Prime Minister Gordon Brown asked Simon Cowell to arrange a charity single as a way of raising money for the earthquake relief effort. It was confirmed that Cowell had asked Burke to sing on the charity single due to her vocal abilities and fanbase. It was revealed that the song would be a cover of R.E.M's "Everybody Hurts", which Cowell choose the song himself as he thought the song's title was most relevant. Brown agreed to waive VAT on the single and R.E.M. agreed to waive all royalties. The celebrities would form a Super group and release the song under the name of "Helping Haiti". Proceeds from the single were split between The Sun's Helping Haiti fund and the Disasters Emergency Committee. The single was released both physically and digitally on 7 February 2010, with the physical release being brought forward by one day due to demand. The single became the fastest-selling charity record of the 21st century in Britain, 205,000 copies in its first two days in the United Kingdom, and 453,000 in its first week. Burke spoke about the charity single saying: "I hope the single raises lots of money. It's great that we can come together and do this. It's a very special song." Soon after the single was released, Burke announced that she would, in fact, travel to Haiti so she can physically help the Haitian people. Burke visited and helped in the week beginning 8 February 2010, and posted two video blogs about her visit on YouTube. She later returned six months later to check the progress of the country after being a huge part in the Save the Children charity campaign. Burke was confirmed to join various female celebrities to join the Peru Inca Trail Hike for Breast Cancer Care, along with Fearne Cotton, Denise Van Outen, and Holly Willoughby. In January 2011, Burke helped to launch Save the Children UK's No Child Born To Die campaign. The campaign aims to reduce child mortality over the next five years.

In October 2012, Burke performed at actor Samuel L. Jackson's launch of the charity Shooting Stars in London. Later that same month, Burke performed for the Great Ormond Street Hospital's Friendship Ball which was held in England. Also in the same month, Burke performed for "Breast Cancer Care" and was announced as the charities most recent celebrity supporter. Burke took part in the 2013 campaign for the charity with a new photoshoot in October 2013. In November 2012, Burke performed at the Royal Concert for Remembrance Day with Russell Watson. In February 2013, Burke appeared on From The Heart on ITV. The television show was created to promote organ donation. Burke performed live with Jools Holland. Also in October 2013, Burke took part in a campaign for PETA in order to tackle the fur trade. She posed naked for the campaign with the slogan "I'd rather go naked than wear fur".

=== Endorsements ===
Burke first signed a merchandise contract when she agreed to become the face of company, Dolce & Gabbana in the United Kingdom and Ireland. After the end of Girls Aloud's contract as ambassadors for Nintendo DS, it was announced that Burke would become the new ambassador for the company; she was replaced by JLS when her contract finished. Then again, Burke recorded a television advertisement which featured Burke's music, "Bad Boys", "All Night Long", and "Start Without You", on this advert, it showed Burke performing in front of an audience and then finishing the performance and using deodorant, Sure Women in order to promote the product. Burke was also the first ever ambassador for the product.

In March 2012, Burke launched her own lipgloss range, "Lip Boom", in partnership with MUA Cosmetics. In 2013, Burke was revealed as the face of Mune Energy Drinks to coincide with the release of her EP. In September 2013, Burke was revealed as the face of Funkin Cocktails. In October 2013, Alexandra Burke recorded a cover of Cyndi Lauper's "Girls Just Want to Have Fun" for The Happy Egg Company in the United Kingdom.

In April 2016, Burke was announced as the ambassador for Slimfast. This endorsement was ongoing in 2019.

== Personal life ==
In 2015, at the age of 27, Burke appeared on Channel 4's Celebrity First Dates; her date was a professional model named Louis. On camera they both agreed to a second date but as the credits rolled the viewers were informed Burke had met someone else. In January 2018 she became engaged to stage manager Joshua Ginnelly. In July 2019, three weeks after separating from her fiancé, Burke was photographed with new boyfriend Rotherham United defender Angus MacDonald during their date at the Wimbledon Tennis Championships. By August 2019, MacDonald had been diagnosed with bowel cancer, an illness he later recovered from. The couple announced their separation on 21 October 2020.

In June 2020, Burke spoke about the racism she had encountered in the music industry. She said that industry figures had previously asked her to bleach her skin, not have braided hair and tailor her music to a white audience.

On 14 February 2022, Burke announced that she was expecting a baby with her boyfriend, professional footballer Darren Randolph. On 10 October 2022, she confirmed on Loose Women that her child was born in June 2022. The couple got engaged in September 2024.

== Stage ==
Year	Title	Role	Notes
2014	The Bodyguard Musical	Rachel Marron	West End
2015-2016	The Bodyguard Musical	Rachel Marron	UK and Ireland Tour
2016–2017	Sister Act The Musical	Deloris Van Cartier	UK and Ireland Tour
2018	Chess	Svetlana Sergievsky	West End Revival
2018	Chicago	Roxie Hart	West End
2018–2020	The Bodyguard Musical	Rachel Marron	UK and Ireland Tour
2021	Joseph and the Amazing Technicolor Dreamcoat	Narrator	West End Revival
2022	Joseph and the Amazing Technicolor Dreamcoat	Narrator	UK National Tour
2022-2023	Jack and the Beanstalk	Mrs Blunderbore	Pantomime
2024	Sister Act	Deloris van Cartier	West End
2025	The Addams Family	Morticia Addams	UK Tour
2026	I'm Every Woman - The Chaka Khan Musical	Chaka Khan	West End

== Discography ==
- Overcome (2009)
- Heartbreak on Hold (2012)
- The Truth Is (2018)

== Filmography ==
=== Television ===
Year	Title	Role	Notes
2001	Star for a Night	Contestant	Series 2
2005; 2008	The X Factor	Contestant	Series 2 and Series 5
2011	So You Think You Can Dance	Guest judge	Episode: "Round 2"
2011	The X Factor	Guest judge	Series 8 Episode: "Live Show 4"
2015	First Dates	Herself	Celebrity Special for SU2C 2015
2017	Strictly Come Dancing	Contestant	Series 15
2018	Loose Women	Herself	Guest panellist
2021	The Great Celebrity Bake Off For Stand Up to Cancer	Contestant	Series 4 Episode 1
2021	Celebrity SAS: Who Dares Wins	Contestant	Series 3
2023	RuPaul's Drag Race UK	Guest judge	Series 5 Episode 6: "Snatch Game"
2024	Curfew	Helen Jones	6 episodes
2024	RuPaul's Drag Race UK	Special guest	Series 6 Episode 4: "Ghoul Power"
2026	Armour	Lorna	10 episodes (Upcoming UK Web series)

=== Film ===
Year	Title	Role	Notes
2023	Pretty Red Dress	Candice	

== Tours ==
- The X Factor Live Tour (2009)
- All Night Long Tour (2011)
- Lady Sings the Blues (2013)
- Alexandra Burke at Jazz Café (2015)
- The Truth Is Tour (2018)

== Awards and nominations ==
Year	Nominee / work	Award	Result
2009	"Hallelujah"	BRIT Award for Best British Single	Nominated
2009	Alexandra Burke	MOBO Award for Best UK Newcomer	Nominated
2010	"Bad Boys"	BRIT Award for Best British Single	Nominated
2010	Alexandra Burke	Glamour Women of the Year Awards for Best Newcomer	Won
2010	Overcome	Urban Music Award for Best Album 2010	Won
2010	"All Night Long"	Urban Music Award for Best Collaboration (with Pitbull)	Won
2010	"All Night Long"	Urban Music Award for Best Music Video	Won
2010	Alexandra Burke	BT Digital Music Awards for Best Female Artist	Won
2010	"Bad Boys"	BT Digital Music Awards for Best Song	Nominated
2010	"Bad Boys"	BT Digital Music Awards for Best Video	Nominated
2010	"Bad Boys"	The 2010 Popjustice £20 Music Prize	Won
2010	Alexandra Burke	MOBO Award for Best UK Act	Nominated
2010	Alexandra Burke	Cosmopolitan for Ultimate UK Music Star	Won
2010	Alexandra Burke	MTV Europe Music Award for Best Push Act	Nominated
2010	Alexandra Burke	XS AWARDS for Best British Star	Won
2010	Alexandra Burke	WSC Gala Awards 2010 for Best Female Artist	Won
2011	"All Night Long"	BRIT Award for Best British Single	Nominated
2011	Alexandra Burke	Glamour Women of the Year Awards for Best UK Musician/Solo Artist	Won
2014	Alexandra Burke	West End Frame Awards 2014 for Best West End Debut	Nominated
2023	"Pretty Red Dress"	British Independent Film Awards 2023 for Best Supporting Performance	Nominated

Preceded by Leon Jackson	Winner of The X Factor; 2008	Succeeded by Joe McElderry
