= Nicholas Bishop =

Nicholas Bishop may refer to:

- Nicholas Bishop (actor, born 1985), British actor
- Nic Bishop (born 1973), English-born Australian actor
