= Maybe It's Love =

Maybe It's Love may refer to:

- Maybe It's Love (1930 film), a pre-Code musical comedy film, or the title song
- Maybe It's Love (1935 film), an American comedy film
- "Maybe It's Love", a song by Alexandra Burke from the album The Truth Is
