= Maria Almeida =

British actress

- Born: 24 April 2004 (age 22)
- Other name: Maria Margarida Almeida
- Years active: 2022–present

Maria Almeida (born 24 April 2004) is a British actress. She first gained prominence through her roles in the Netflix film The Strays and the Amazon Prime series Fifteen-Love (both 2023).

== Early life ==
Almeida is of Angolan-Portuguese heritage. Almeida trained as a dancer and intended to go to drama school for dance or musical theatre before being cast in The Strays.

== Career ==
Almeida made her feature film debut in Dionne Edwards' 2022 drama Pretty Red Dress as Cicely. The following year, Almeida starred as Mary in the Netflix horror film The Strays directed by Nathaniel Martello-White and made her television debut with a main role as Luisa Molina in the Amazon Prime tennis drama Fifteen-Love. She also featured in the Peacock anthology Suburban Screams.

After appearances in the second series of the ITVX teen drama Tell Me Everything as Peaches and the third series of the Sky Atlantic crime drama Gangs of London as Rhasidat in 2024, Almeida joined the recurring cast of the Apple TV+ period drama The Buccaneers for its second series as Cora Merrigan in 2025. In 2026, she has a role as Avery in the BBC One miniseries Two Weeks in August.

== Filmography ==
=== Film ===
Year	Title	Role	Notes
2022	Pretty Red Dress	Cicely	
2023	The Strays	Mary	Netflix film
2024	Portrait	Siah	Short film
2025	Screening Room	The Girlfriend	Short film

=== Television ===
Year	Title	Role	Notes
2023	Fifteen-Love	Luisa Molina	Main role
2023	Suburban Screams	May	Episode: "Kelly"
2024	Tell Me Everything	Peaches	2 episodes
2025	Gangs of London	Rhasidat	1 episode
2025	The Buccaneers	Cora Merrigan	3 episodes
2026	Two Weeks in August	Avery	8 episodes
