= Star for a Night =

Star for a Night may refer to:

- Star for a Night (film), American drama, 1936
- Star for a Night (British TV series), BBC One talent show, 1999-2001
- Star for a Night (Philippine TV series), IBC singing contest, 2002-2003
