= Brock Norman Brock =

British screenwriter and playwright

Brock Norman Brock (born October 1966) is a British screenwriter and playwright. Early in his career, his play Here is Monster was nominated for the Verity Bargate Award. The premiere production in 1990–91 was staged by the Show of Strength Theatre Company and directed by Mark Ravenhill.

Later, he ventured into screenwriting as the co-writer of Nicolas Winding Refn's film Bronson (2009). Since then, he has co-written Yardie (2018) and The Mustang (2019).

He is a member of the Honourable Artillery Company, having served in the active unit in the 2000s.
