= Fifteen-Love =

British television series

- Genre: Sports; Drama
- Created by: Hania Elkington
- Screenplay by: Hania Elkington
- Directed by: Eva Riley; Toby MacDonald
- Starring: Ella Lily Hyland; Aidan Turner
- Theme music composer: Jessica Jones
- Original language: English
- No. of series: 1
- No. of episodes: 6

Production
- Executive producers: Jake Lushington; Hania Elkington; Eva Riley; Toby Macdonald
- Producer: Natasha Romaniuk
- Cinematography: Steven Cameron Ferguson; David Pimm
- Editors: Abolfazl Talooni; Paul Dingwall
- Production companies: World Productions; ITV Studios

Original release
- Network: Amazon Prime Video
- Release: 21 July 2023

Fifteen-Love is a British six-part television drama series created by Hania Elkington and World Productions, starring Ella Lily Hyland and Aidan Turner. It premiered on Amazon Prime Video on 21 July 2023.

== Synopsis ==
A former tennis prodigy makes an explosive allegation against her former coach with whom she reached a semi-final at the French Open. Five years on from a bad injury she has entered therapy with a new psychologist whilst he is still coaching a new prospect.

== Cast ==
=== Main ===
- Ella Lily Hyland as Justine Pearce
- Aidan Turner as Glenn Lapthorn
- Harmony Rose-Bremner as Renee Okoye
- Tom Varey as Steve O'Callaghan
- Lorenzo Richelmy as Gianluca Barzaghi
- Manon Azem as Khalida Lapthorn
- Jess Darrow as Mikki Easton
- Anna Chancellor as Andi Woodward
- Elizabeth Berrington as Carol Pearce
- Steffan Rhodri as Christy Pearce
- Amar Chadha-Patel as Rushikesh "Rusty" Raj
- Maria Almeida as Luisa Molina
- David Troughton as Charles Lapthorn

=== Recurring ===
- Rosie Dwyer as Kiki Zhang
- Chuku Modu as Patrick Keen
- Sarah Durham as DCI Shaw
- Matt Barkley as DI Maplin
- Alex Romashov as Marc
- Archie George as Eddie
- Elliot Cowan as Adam Jaffe
- Alma Prelec as Apolenka "Polly" Katić
- Edita Sllamniku as Žaneta Katić
- Seeta Indrani as Diane Gough
- Ian Gelder as David Tillett
- Sebastian Fuentes as Matteo Molina
- Edward Wolstenholme as Milo Watkins

=== Guest ===
- Siubhan Harrison as Carrie Fisk
- Hein van der Heijden as Pepijn Saltzherr
- Bo Poraj as Jeremy Clough
- Brahmdeo Shannon Ramana as Krish
- Claire de Boer as Isabella Molina
- Ade Adepitan as Sports Presenter
- Carlotta Banat as Sabine Scholz
- Camilla Aiko as Bella
- Kate Woodman as Natalie

== Episodes ==
| No. | Title | Directed by | Written by | Original release date |
|---|---|---|---|---|
| 1 | "Episode 1" | Eva Riley | Hania Elkington | 21 July 2023 |
Teenage tennis star Justine Pearce badly injures her wrist in her first Grand Slam semifinal, ending her prospects. 5 years later, she runs into her ex-coach, Glenn Lapthorne, whose new protege has just won the French Open.
| 2 | "Episode 2" | Eva Riley | Hania Elkington | 21 July 2023 |
Justine's explosive allegation causes rifts in her closest relationships, and she must fight to control the truth of her and Glenn's past, enlisting the help of new flame, Mikki.
| 3 | "Episode 3" | Eva Riley | Hania Elkington | 21 July 2023 |
As Justine spirals in the aftermath of the tribunal, she begins to obsess over an American exchange player who reminds her of her teenage self. Meanwhile, Mikki gets closer to Glenn, who thinks a new PR manager might be just what he needs.
| 4 | "Episode 4" | Toby MacDonald | Hania Elkington | 21 July 2023 |
Justine's actions with Luisa damage her reputation further, as Longwood prepares for the biggest Grand Slam event of the year. Justine looks to repair her friendship with Renee, and help her friend reach new heights at the tournament.
| 5 | "Episode 5" | Toby MacDonald | Hania Elkington | 21 July 2023 |
Glenn's relationship with Luca is on a knife-edge as he steps into the fourth round of The Championships. Meanwhile, Steve realizes he might have made a terrible mistake with Luisa, and attempts to put things right.
| 6 | "Episode 6" | Toby MacDonald | Hania Elkington | 21 July 2023 |
Renee steps out onto Centre Court for the quarter finals of The Championships, but can her friendship with Justine survive? Justine must come to terms with what Glenn did to her and make a final attempt to bring him to justice.

== Production ==
In May 2022, it was revealed Amazon Prime had greenlit Fifteen-Love, a six-part series created by Hania Elkington, who acts as scriptwriter and executive producer. The show is produced by World Productions and directed by Eva Riley for the first three episodes and Toby MacDonald the latter three. The series is produced by Natasha Romaniuk.

Elkington said of the project's theme "Writing this drama…has been revelatory. I hope that Fifteen-Love has the same effect on its audience, and can become another valuable part of this urgent, emerging story."

In August 2022, it was announced Aidan Turner and Ella Lily Hyland would star in the series. Also joining the cast were Anna Chancellor, Jessica Darrow, Tom Varey, Lorenzo Richelmy, Manon Azem, Elizabeth Berrington, Amar Chadha-Patel, Steffan Rhodri, as well as Maria Margarida Almeida and Harmony Rose-Bremner.

Ella Lily Hyland trained for the tennis scenes and was helped on set by tennis coach and former-pro Naomi Cavaday.

Filming took place in St Albans in Hertfordshire. The Longwood Academy was filmed at Tring Park School for the Performing Arts in Hertfordshire. Grand Slam scenes were filmed in Edinburgh and Eastbourne.

Original music was composed by English composer Jessica Jones.

== Release ==
The series was released on Amazon Prime Video on 21 July 2023.
