= Gideon Adlon =

American actress (born 1997)

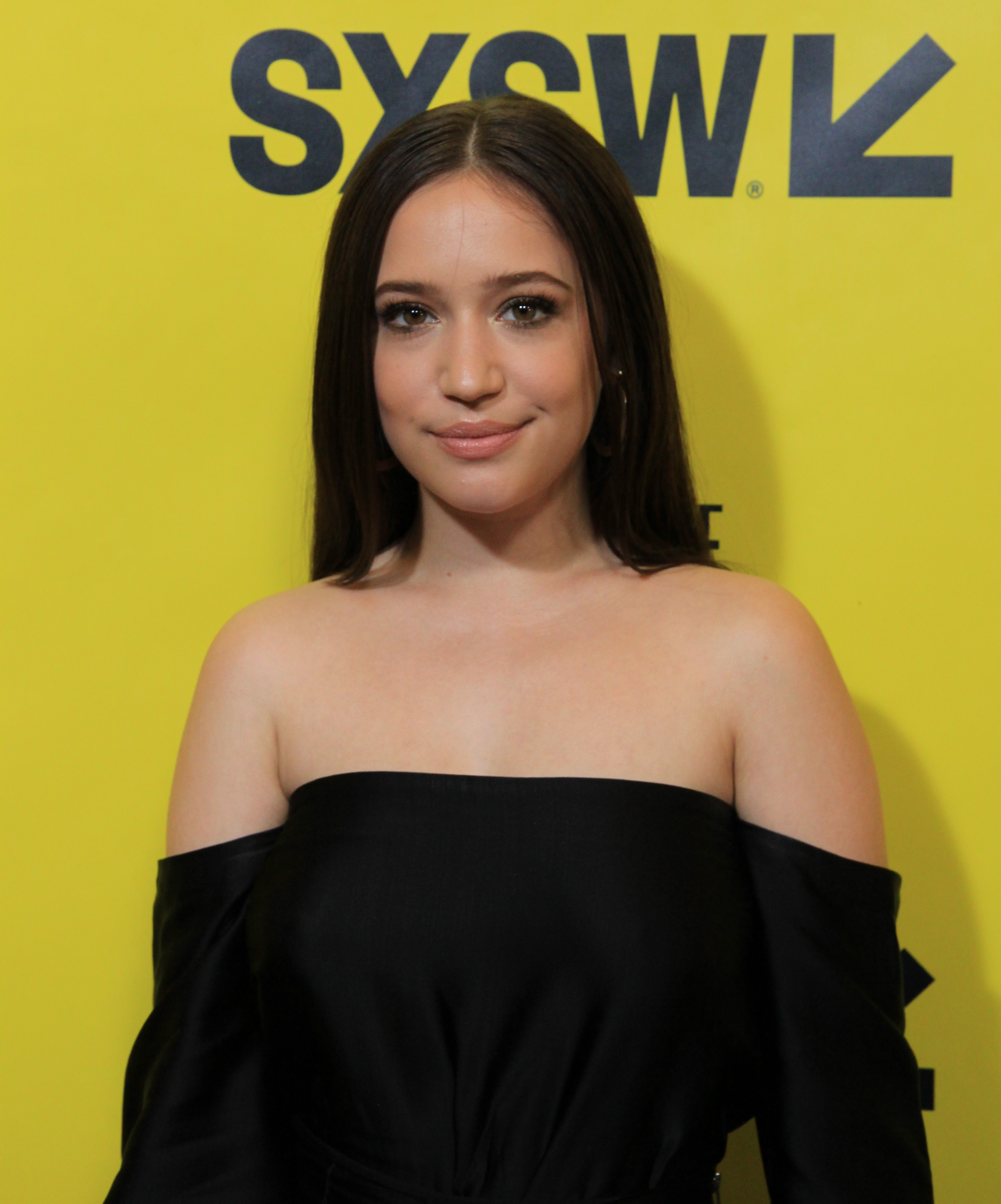
- Adlon at the 2018 SXSW
- Born: Gideon Don Adlon; March 30, 1997 (age 29); Los Angeles, California, U.S.
- Occupation: Actress
- Years active: 2011−present
- Mother: Pamela Adlon
- Relatives: Odessa A'zion (sister); Percy Adlon (paternal grandfather); Lorenz Adlon (3x great-grandfather)

Gideon Don Adlon (/ˈædlɒn/ AD-lon; born March 30, 1997) is an American actress. Her films include Blockers (2018), The Mustang (2019), The Craft: Legacy (2020), Sick (2022) and Miller's Girl (2024). On television, she is known for her roles in the Netflix series The Society (2019) and the NBC series The Thing About Pam (2022).

She is also known for her voice work on the video game The Walking Dead: The Final Season (2018), the animated series Pacific Rim: The Black (2021–2022), Battle Kitty (2022), Shape Island (2023), Terminator Zero (2024) and Star Wars: Maul – Shadow Lord (2026).

== Early life and education ==
Adlon was born in Los Angeles and holds both American and German citizenship through her father. She is the oldest daughter of actress Pamela Adlon and director Felix Adlon. Her younger sisters are actress Odessa A'zion and Valentine "Rocky" Adlon. Her paternal grandfather was German filmmaker Percy Adlon and her maternal grandfather was American writer-producer Don Segall. Her maternal grandfather was born to a Jewish family, and her English-born maternal grandmother, originally an Anglican, converted to Judaism. Through her father, she descends from the German hotelier Lorenz Adlon.

Adlon studied photography at Columbia College Chicago for a year before deciding to pursue acting full-time.

== Career ==
Adlon made her professional acting debut in a 2011 episode of the FX comedy-drama series Louie, which also featured her mother Pamela. She went on to make guest appearances in the Disney Channel sitcom Girl Meets World (2016), the FX comedy-drama series Better Things (2016), the ABC miniseries When We Rise (2017), the CBS crime drama series Criminal Minds (2017), and the ABC anthology crime drama series American Crime (2017).

Adlon received further recognition for her first starring role in the sex comedy film Blockers (2018), which received positive reviews and box office success. She went on to star in the critically acclaimed drama film The Mustang (2019). Also in 2019, Adlon had a starring role as Becca Gelb in the Netflix mystery teen drama series The Society. The series was originally renewed for a second season, but was later canceled as a result of the COVID-19 pandemic causing cost increases and difficulty scheduling production.

Adlon starred as Frankie in the horror sequel film The Craft: Legacy, which was released on October 28, 2020. In 2021 she starred as Claire in the horror fantasy film Witch Hunt. She portrayed Winnie Black in the psychological thriller Miller's Girl (2024), alongside Jenna Ortega and Martin Freeman. In a review by The New York Times, Adlon was described as a standout in the film.

She voiced Devon Izara, a Twi'lek Jedi, in the Disney+ animated series Star Wars: Maul – Shadow Lord. In 2026, she appeared in the third and final season of the HBO drama series Euphoria.

== Filmography ==
=== Film ===
Year	Title	Role	Notes
2018	Blockers	Sam Lockwood	
2019	The Mustang	Martha Coleman	
2020	The Craft: Legacy	Frankie	
2021	Witch Hunt	Claire Goode	
2022	Sick	Parker Mason	
2023	Legion of Super-Heroes	Phantom Girl	Voice
2023	Batman: The Doom That Came to Gotham	Oracle / Barbara Gordon, Poison Ivy	Voice
2024	Miller's Girl	Winnie	
2024	Justice League: Crisis on Infinite Earths - Part Two	Batgirl / Barbara Gordon	Voice
TBA	Preppy †		Filming

=== Television ===
Year	Title	Role	Notes
2011	Louie	Amy	Episode: "Niece"
2016	Girl Meets World	Felicity	Episode: "Girl Meets Triangle"
2016	Better Things	Gina	Episode: "Alarms"
2017	When We Rise	Teenaged Annie Jones	Miniseries
2017	Criminal Minds	Katie Hammond	Episode: "Hell's Kitchen"
2017	American Crime	Tracy	2 episodes
2019	The Society	Becca Gelb	Main role
2020	Day by Day	Jacqueline	Episode: "Carry Me Home"
2020	Solar Opposites	Lydia	Voice, episode: "The Matter Transfer Array"
2021–2022	Pacific Rim: The Black	Hayley Travis	Main voice role
2022	The Thing About Pam	Mariah Day	Main role
2022	Battle Kitty	ZaZa Royale	Main voice role
2022	Slippin' Jimmy	Dawn Marie	Voice, 2 episodes
2023	Moon Girl and Devil Dinosaur	Lara, Laura, and Laurel	Voice, episode: "Today, I Am a Woman"
2023	Star Trek: Lower Decks	Ensign Haubold	Voice, episode: "Empathological Fallacies"
2023–2025	Shape Island	Circle	Main voice role
2024	Star Wars: Young Jedi Adventures	Pak Relda	Voice, episode: "Lys' Lost Lightsaber"
2024	Terminator Zero	Reika Lee	Main voice role; 7 episodes
2025	Ghosts	Abigail 'Abby' Pinkus	3 episodes
2026	Euphoria	Gillie	3 episodes
2026–present	Star Wars: Maul – Shadow Lord	Devon Izara	Main voice role; 10 episodes

=== Video games ===
Year	Title	Role	Notes
2018–2019	The Walking Dead: The Final Season	Violet	
2023	Marvel's Midnight Suns	Dahlia, Additional Voices	DLC
2023	Spider-Man 2	Additional voices	
