= The Strays (film) =

2023 British film by Nathaniel Martello-White

- Release poster
- Directed by: Nathaniel Martello-White
- Screenplay by: Nathaniel Martello-White
- Produced by: Valentina Brazzini; Tristan Goligher; Rob Watson
- Starring: Ashley Madekwe; Bukky Bakray; Jorden Myrie; Samuel Small; Maria Almeida; Justin Salinger
- Cinematography: Adam Scarth
- Edited by: Mark Towns
- Music by: Emilie Levienaise-Farrouch
- Production companies: Air Street Films; The Bureau
- Distributed by: Netflix
- Release date: 22 February 2023
- Running time: 100 minutes
- Country: United Kingdom
- Language: English

The Strays is a 2023 British horror thriller film written and directed by Nathaniel Martello-White, in his directorial debut. In the film, Neve (Ashley Madekwe) is a biracial upper-class woman leading an idyllic life with her family. As a socialite in her community and the deputy headmistress of a private school, Neve's privileged life is jeopardized when her troubled past resurfaces to undermine everything she has built.

== Plot ==
Cheryl is living in an undisclosed location in England. She expresses concerns about discrimination and financial difficulties to her sister on the phone. The subsequent scenes show her rejecting phone calls from her spouse and leaving a message on the fridge about going to the hairdresser.

Several years later, Neve, who is also biracial and half-black-half-white, has a disdain for anything regarding "blackness", as she mostly passes for white. She has a white husband named Ian, and they have two quarter-black children, Sebastian and Mary. Neve works at her kids’ school as a deputy headmistress and plans to host a fundraising gala at her home, but is often interrupted by seeing strange visions of two black teenagers, which scare her. At the fundraising gala, Neve confronts them, after seeing that the two of them are real and physically there and aren't hallucinations. They address her as their "mother".

Flashbacks to five days prior, where the two teenagers arrive at the town on a "mission"-- their names are revealed to be Dione and Carl. Carl takes on the name "Marvin" and getting a job as the school janitor and Dione takes the name “Abigail” and works as an assistant in Ian's office. They befriend Neve's children, with Dione inviting Mary to the hotel room for drinking and partying and Carl inviting Sebastian to smoke after his basketball game. Afterwards, Carl convinces Sebastian to brutally attack his school bully.

In the present day, it is revealed that Neve is Cheryl, and Carl and Dione are indeed her children; she had them with a full-blooded black man, and changed her name from Cheryl to Neve in order to move away and escape after realizing that that life path only brought her more discrimination, hence why she hates all forms of "blackness"-- the two children followed her and manipulated her other kids in order to force her to reconcile with the fact that she abandoned them. Neve meets Carl and Dione at a diner and gives them ten thousand pounds each in order to help them back on their feet as they return to London. However, Carl and Dione break into Neve's house. Carl takes everyone's phones and dumps them in the sink, where he turns on the water that starts to flood the living room. Carl and Dione claim it's Dione's birthday and they should celebrate as a family, and force the family to order Uber Eats.

Carl confronts Neve for trying to pay them off, which was unknown to the rest of her family. This leads to Ian threatening a divorce, however, Dione intervenes and suggests playing a board game. Neve, who is visibly upset, vomits, but having a panic attack at the blatant insanity of her abandoned children and her inability to escape from her fears, she begins to act uncannily happy and the group begins to play Scrabble. Carl becomes annoyed and forfeits the game before demanding that Ian accompany him to the family's gym. There, Carl coerces Ian to lift increasingly heavy weights until he is unable to hold them, and the weight falls on him, resulting in his apparent death, whereupon Carl returns to the group like nothing happened.

Meanwhile, after the Uber Eats driver arrives, Neve tells the group she will tip the driver and be right back; she does not return. A motorbike is heard revving up and pulling away, implying that Neve has left with the driver. Mary and Sebastian are left standing in the flooded living room with Dione and Carl, as Neve has now abandoned her second set of children.

== Cast ==
- Ashley Madekwe as Neve / Cheryl Clark
- Bukky Bakray as Abigail "Abby" / Dione Clark
- Jorden Myrie as Marvin / Carl Clark
- Samuel Small as Sebastian
- Maria Almeida as Mary
- Justin Salinger as Ian
- Lucy Liemann as Amanda
- Tom Andrews as Barry
- Rob Jarvis as Robert
- Michael Warburton as Kenneth
- Alastair Ellery as Keith
- Vanessa Bailey as Elle
- Joanna Brookes as Betty

== Production ==
The film was produced by Valentina Brazzini, Tristan Goligher and Rob Watson. Emilie Levienaise-Farrouch composed the score.

Principal photography took place between September and November 2021, in London, Suffolk and Berkshire.

== Release ==
The Strays was released on Netflix on 22 February 2023.

== Reception ==
On the review aggregator website Rotten Tomatoes, 52% of 25 critics' reviews are positive, with an average rating of 5.7/10. The website's consensus reads: "The Strays' social satire is sharp enough, but its bite is softened by a messy plot and an overall lack of discipline." Metacritic, which uses a weighted average, assigned the film a score of 58 out of 100, based on five critics, indicating "mixed or average" reviews.
