= Jorden Myrie =

English actor

- Born: 1994 (age 31–32); Bolton, Greater Manchester, England
- Years active: 2020–present
- Family: Clive Myrie (uncle)

Jorden Myrie (born 1994) is an English actor. He was named a 2022 Screen International Star of Tomorrow. He starred in the film The Strays (2023). On television, he appeared in the ITV series Stephen (2021), the BBC series Mood (2022) and Sherwood (2024), and Channel 4 series Screw (2022).

== Early life ==
Myrie was born in Bolton, Greater Manchester and grew up in Derby. His uncle is the BBC News chief presenter and foregin correspondent Clive Myrie. Myrie trained at the Television Workshop in Nottingham.

== Career ==
Myrie began his career collaborating with his Television Workshop coursemates on the 2020 comedy web series Shepherd's Delight. Myrie subsequently made his mainstream television role portraying Stephen Lawrence's younger brother Stuart in the ITV factual miniseries Stephen.

This was followed in 2022 by roles as Raheem Bennett in the Channel 4 prison drama Screw and Kobi in the BBC Three musical series Mood. In 2023, Myrie had his first starring film role as Marvin in the horror-thriller The Strays on Netflix. In 2024, he joined the main cast of the BBC One crime drama Sherwood for its second series as DCI Marcus Clarke. He also had a recurring role as Lord Stanton in the fourth season of the Netflix period drama Bridgerton.

Myrie has an upcoming role in the Amazon Prime series Vought Rising.

== Filmography ==
=== Film ===
Year	Title	Role	Notes
2020	Dancing in the Dark	Connor	
2021	Get Gone	Martin Johnson	
2023	The Strays	Marvin / Carl Clark	Netflix film
2025	Ticket	Bukasa	Short film
TBA	We're All Black Down Here		

=== Television ===
Year	Title	Role	Notes
2020	Shepherd's Delight	Jorden	Webseries, 4 episodes
2021	Stephen	Stuart Lawrence	Miniseries, 3 episodes
2022	Screw	Raheem Bennett	Main role (series 1)
2022	Mood	Kobi	Miniseries, 5 episodes
2024	Bridgerton	Lord Stanton	4 episodes (season 3)
2024	Sherwood	DCI Marcus Clarke	Main role (series 2)
2026	Marble Hall Murders	Matthew Flynn	
2027	Vought Rising		
TBA	Hamburg Days	Lord Woodbine	
