= Laure de Clermont-Tonnerre =

French actress, director and producer

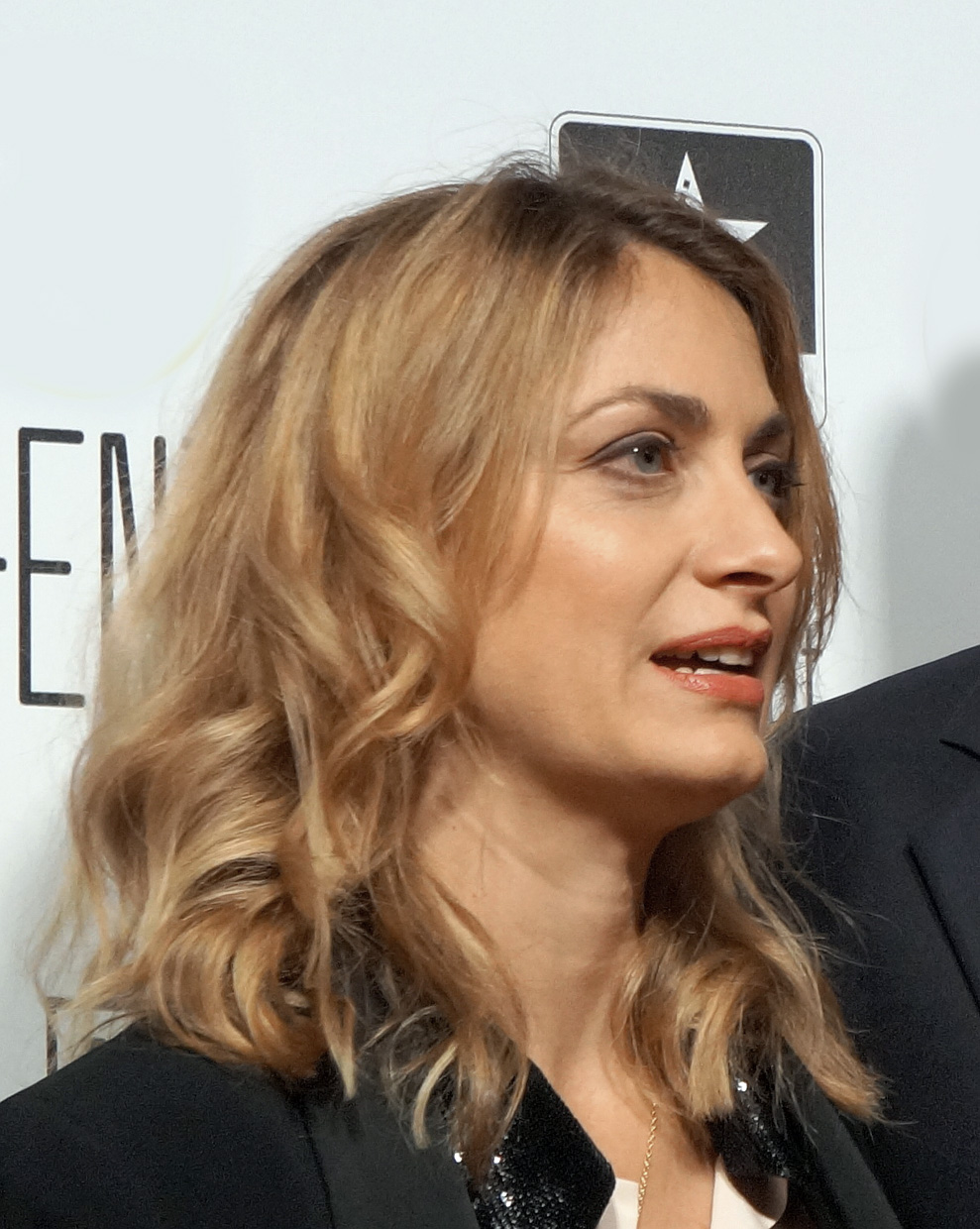
- Born: Laure Marsa Frédérique de Clermont-Tonnerre; Paris, France
- Occupation(s): Film director, producer, actress, and screenwriter

Laure de Clermont-Tonnerre is a French film actress, director, producer, and screenwriter. Beginning as an actress in primarily French film and television, she transitioned into film directing and screenwriting. In 2019, she directed, associated produced, and co-wrote her debut feature film, The Mustang. For the film, she was nominated for Best First Feature at the 35th Independent Spirit Awards and she won the Bingham Ray Breakthrough Director Award at the 2019 Gotham Independent Film Awards. She also won Best First Feature at the 24th Satellite Awards. She had previously written and directed two shorts, Atlantic Avenue and Rabbit, debuting the latter at Sundance Film Festival. In 2019, she also directed three episodes, including the pilot, of the TV show The Act. In 2022, she directed Lady Chatterley's Lover, a film adaptation of D. H. Lawrence's novel Lady Chatterley's Lover, starring Emma Corrin.
