= Wild Horse Inmate Rehabilitation Programs =

American penal rehabilitation program

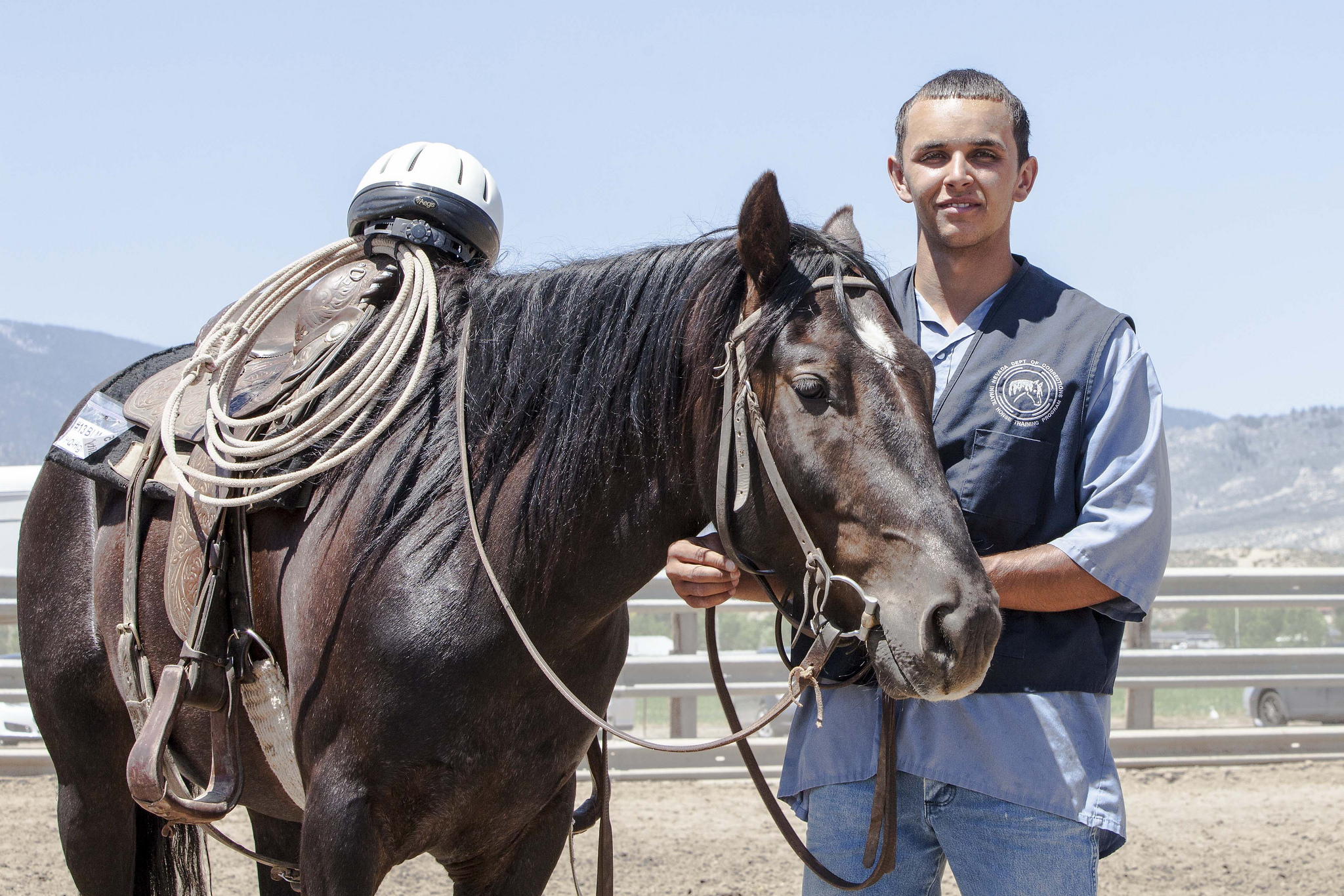
An inmate at Northern Nevada Correctional Center stands for a picture with a gentled wild horse.

Beginning in 1988 at Southern New Mexico Correctional Facility, Wild Horse Inmate Rehabilitation Programs provide animal therapy and work experience opportunities for inmates. Correctional facilities work directly with the Bureau of Land Management (BLM) to provide rehabilitation opportunities through working with wild mustangs that have been rounded up due to overgrazing or overpopulation for inmates who fit the qualifications to be a part of the program. Inmates not only work at the equine facilities where the mustangs are held but also participate in training, commonly referred to as gentling, the mustangs to improve their chances of adoption. Tasks include feeding, watering, and grooming the mustangs, as well as mucking paddocks and/or stalls. Inmates who participate in the training of wild mustangs will often be the first person to touch the wild horse and will gentle them to varying degrees, including halter-training, saddle-training, and training them in ridden work. After they have been gentled, most of the mustangs are adopted to various people, including the inmates who gentled them after they have completed their sentence.

Wild Horse Inmate Rehabilitation Programs, when implemented, have shown an increase in an inmate's sense of responsibility and accomplishment while giving them a challenge that makes their sentence meaningful. Working with horses also provides an aspect of animal therapy for the inmates involved. Most programs notice a decrease in disciplinary reports, both minor and major, and recidivism. These programs also often increase the rates at which wild mustangs are being adopted.

== Participating Facilities ==
=== Southern New Mexico Correctional Facility ===
The Southern New Mexico Correctional Facility made an agreement with the BLM in 1988 which began their well-known but short-lived Wild Horse Inmate Rehabilitation Program. At first, only older horses were sent to the program so they would be easier to adopt, but it eventually turned into a much larger program, inspiring similar programs to start at prisons in Los Lunas and Santa Fe. The BLM paid $1.85 per horse per day to fulfill a boarding fee and $56 per horse once they were trained. Due to federal budget cuts, the Southern New Mexico Correctional Facility Wild Horse Inmate Rehabilitation Program shut down in 1992. However, in the short time the program was open, 20-30 inmates were employed at all times and nearly 2,400 horses, 600 per year, were gentled. Although this program did not last long, it sparked a new generation of rehabilitation programs for inmates. After most rehabilitation programs were written off in the mid-1970s, Southern New Mexico Correctional Facility's Wild Horse Inmate Rehabilitation Program showed that inmate rehabilitation was possible and inspired the development of similar programs that are still successful today

=== Northern Nevada Correctional Center/Stewart Conservation Camp Saddle Horse and Burro Training Program ===
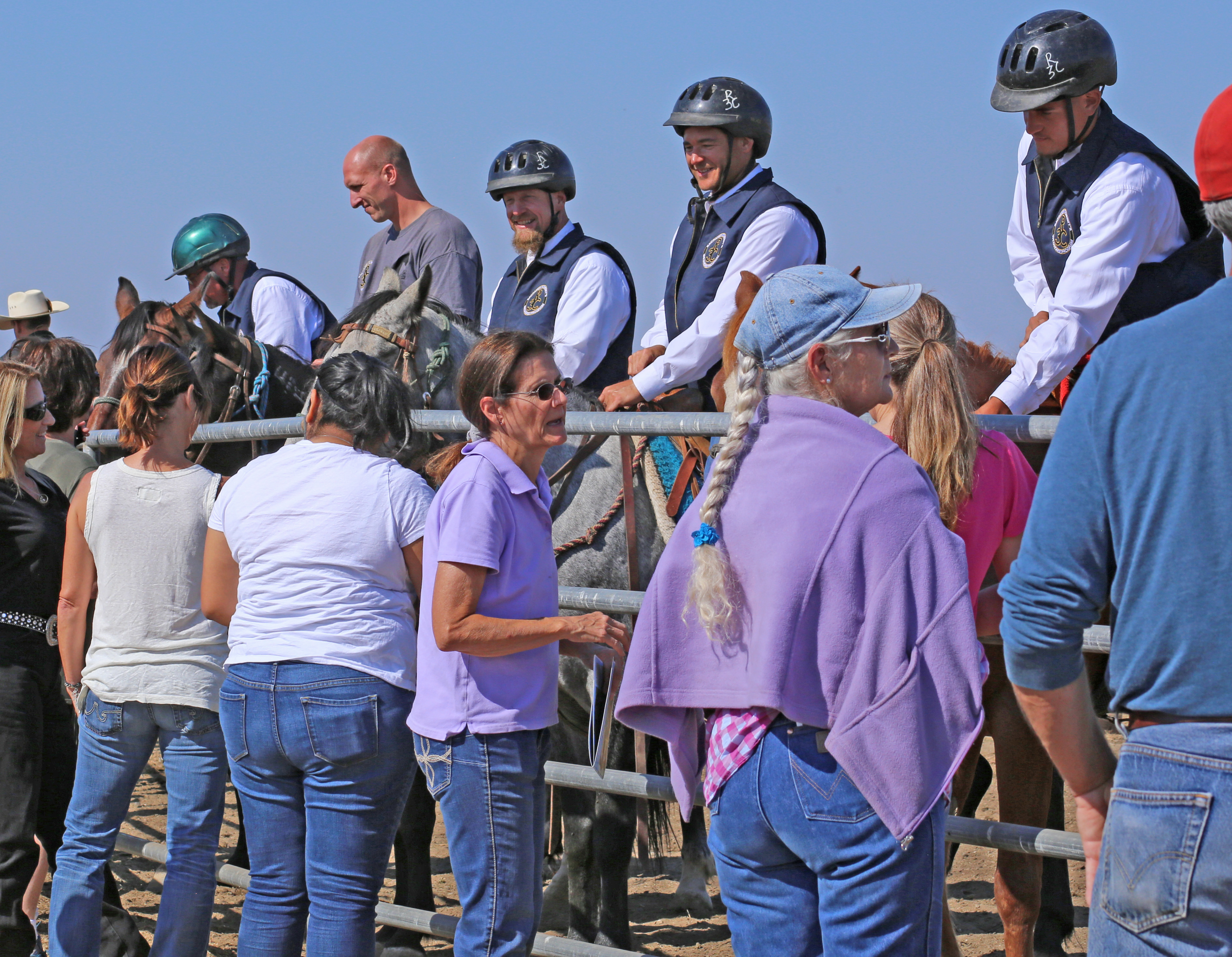
Participants in an adoption event at Rio Cosumnes Correctional Center in California meet the mustangs up for adoption and their trainers.

Made famous by the movie The Mustang, the Northern Nevada Correctional Center (NNCC) contains a facility next to the correctional facility that can hold up to 2,000 animals and provides areas for gentling wild horses and adoption events. Approximately 60-80 wild horses and burros are gentled and adopted through the NNCC rehabilitation program a year. Each horse or burro is paired with an inmate and trained for 120 days. Then, the facility is opened to the public for an adoption event. About 3-4 adoption events are held annually. They are conducted as competitive-bids run by an auctioneer where the highest bidder will be given a year with the adopted animal before applying for a title which will transfer the ownership of the wild horse or burro to the adopter. Bidding starts at $150 but often exceeds that. Before the adoption event starts, participants are given time to meet the horses and their trainers. The NNCC program is self-sustaining and relies on training fees from the BLM, which are around $1,000 per horse. There are similar programs in Arizona, Wyoming, Kansas, Colorado, and California

== Recidivism, Disciplinary Reports, and Job Offers ==
Wild Horse Inmate Rehabilitation Programs often teach inmates how to respect and be patient with another being. They also develop their communication skills and their abilities to work in groups and follow instructions due to working with fellow inmates and alongside horsemen. During the first four years of the Wild Horse Inmate Rehabilitation Program at Southern New Mexico Correctional Facility, violent offenders and property offenders who were a part of the program both showed a decrease in major disciplinary reports while violent offenders also showed a decrease in minor disciplinary reports. Similarly, inmates who participate in Wild Horse Inmate Rehabilitation Programs show a decrease in recidivism. Across the country, only 15% of inmates who participate in these programs return to prison after their release. The inmates who participate in the rehabilitation program at Northern Nevada Correctional Center are half as likely to return to prison after they are released compared to their fellow inmates who are not a part of the program. Many inmates have also received job opportunities working with horses upon their release.
