= Sick (2022 film) =

Film by John Hyams

- Release poster
- Directed by: John Hyams
- Written by: Kevin Williamson; Katelyn Crabb
- Produced by: Kevin Williamson; Bill Block; Ben Fast
- Starring: Gideon Adlon; Beth Million; Dylan Sprayberry; Joel Courtney; Marc Menchaca; Jane Adams
- Cinematography: Yaron Levy
- Edited by: Andrew Drazek
- Music by: Nima Fakhrara
- Production companies: Blumhouse Productions; Miramax; Outerbanks Entertainment
- Distributed by: Peacock
- Release dates: September 11, 2022 (TIFF); January 13, 2023 (United States)
- Running time: 83 minutes
- Country: United States
- Language: English

Sick is a 2022 American slasher film directed by John Hyams and written by Kevin Williamson and Katelyn Crabb. The film stars Gideon Adlon, Beth Million, and Dylan Sprayberry. The film follows a pair of friends quarantined at a lake house where they are then hunted by a mysterious killer.

Sick premiered at the Toronto International Film Festival on September 11, 2022, and was released on Peacock on January 13, 2023. The film received generally positive reviews from critics.

== Plot ==
In April 2020, during the COVID-19 pandemic, college student Tyler Murphy is attacked and killed in his dorm room by a masked assailant, after receiving anonymous text messages.

Best friends Parker Mason and Miri Woodlow decide to quarantine together at Parker's family's secluded lake house, posting about their trip on Instagram. Upon arrival, Parker begins to receive strange text messages from an unknown number, unsettling both girls. Later that evening, an unknown visitor arrives in the driveway, knocks on the door, and enters through the backdoor. They are revealed to be DJ, Parker's fling. Parker reluctantly allows him to stay the night. DJ later confronts Parker about an Instagram post which showed her kissing a boy named Benji at a party; Parker insists she is not interested in a serious relationship.

When DJ walks outside to his truck, a masked figure sneaks into the house. The intruder steals everyone's phones while they are asleep. DJ and Parker awake when loud music plays downstairs. DJ notices an intruder and instructs Parker to exit and wait in his truck. The intruder prepares to attack the sleeping Miri in her bedroom, but DJ subdues the masked intruder, allowing Miri to flee and join Parker. As DJ tries to escape, the intruder overpowers and stabs him multiple times before fatally impaling him with a metal pike. The girls attempt to drive away, but crash into a tree after discovering the tires have been slashed.

Chased by the intruder, Parker and Miri race back to the house. As they escape through the attic window, Miri gets pushed off the roof. The intruder ambushes Parker in the kitchen, but she gains the upper hand and repeatedly bludgeons his head. A second masked perpetrator arrives, distraught to find his accomplice presumably dead. Outside, Parker finds Miri alive with a shattered leg, telling her to play dead. The second intruder almost discovers Miri's act before Parker distracts them towards the lake. After crossing it, she enters the neighbor's house and pleads for assistance. The intruder enters, slitting the man's throat and continuing his rampant pursuit. Meanwhile, Miri makes her way back into the house and crafts a splint for her leg. The first intruder regains consciousness and attacks Miri, who slashes his throat, killing him.

Parker makes it to the highway and incapacitates the second intruder as a car approaches. Despite begging the woman inside for help, she refuses, insisting she cannot enter without a mask. The driver offers Parker a spare mask, which turns out to be laced with chloroform, knocking her out. The driver and the intruder take Parker back to the lake house and conduct a COVID-19 test on her. Both are revealed to be a husband and wife named Jason and Pamela, while the dead intruder is their elder son. They reveal that Benji, the boy Parker was seen kissing on Instagram, is their younger son who has since died of COVID-19. The previous COVID-19 test returns positive and the couple blame Parker for infecting Benji at the party, wishing to avenge him by killing her. They also confess to the murder of Tyler Murphy, as he was the one who infected Parker.

Miri attempts to contact the police via a laptop, but Jason notices the active Wi-Fi and destroys the router. As Jason heads outside to search for Miri, Pamela threatens Parker; Miri sneaks up behind Pamela and strikes her with a liquor bottle, before Parker shoves her through a window. Jason returns and walks up the stairs to search for the girls, who throw him over the banister onto a pair of deer antlers, killing him. Parker and Miri escape to a nearby barn, where they find a utility task vehicle. While retrieving gasoline, Parker is attacked by a still-alive Pamela. In the ensuing altercation, Parker douses Pamela in gasoline, and Miri uses a lighter to set her on fire. A screaming Pamela runs outside engulfed in flames, eventually collapsing on the road. The police arrive as the two friends watch Pamela burn to death.

== Cast ==
- Gideon Adlon as Parker Mason
- Beth Million as Miri Woodlow
- Dylan Sprayberry as DJ Cole
- Marc Menchaca as Jason
- Jane Adams as Pamela
- Joel Courtney as Tyler
- Chris Reid as Jeb
- Duane Stephens as Mr. Lyons
- Logan Murphy as Benji

== Production ==
In May 2021, it was announced that Miramax greenlit the film with Kevin Williamson and Katelyn Crabb attached to write, along with John Hyams to direct, and Gideon Adlon to star. Principal photography was completed in mid-2021 in and around Weber County, Utah.

== Release ==
Sick premiered at the Toronto International Film Festival on September 11, 2022. The film was released on Peacock on January 13, 2023.

== Reception ==
=== Critical response ===
On the review aggregator website Rotten Tomatoes, 87% of 62 critics' reviews are positive, with an average rating of 7/10. The website's consensus reads: "Smart, self-aware, and all too timely, this slasher co-written by Kevin Williamson is Sick in all the best ways." Metacritic, which uses a weighted average, assigned the film a score of 62 out of 100, based on 14 critics, indicating "generally favorable" reviews.

Simon Abrams of RogerEbert.com gave the film 3/4 stars, calling it "an exceptional new slasher pic" and writing, "Sick is exactly what it looks like, and a lot of mean-spirited fun at that." The Guardian's Adrian Horton gave it 3/5 stars, calling it "competent mid-level horror whose Covid container is tight enough to make the film's 2020-ness feel fitting rather than dated." Peter Debruge of Variety said the film "not only factors in our still-evolving COVID-era rules but also serves as an amusing time capsule for the collective fear that has seized us these past three years." Noel Murray of the Los Angeles Times called it "a slickly formulaic mid-budget horror movie, well-crafted by the screenwriters and directed with style and energy by the skilled John Hyams."

David Fear of Rolling Stone was more critical of the film, writing, "if you're willing to sit through an otherwise stock take on the ol' teens-and-terror-at-a-lake-house chestnut in the name of Covidsploitation curiosity, have at it." TheWrap's William Bibbiani called the film "a rote morality play with familiar set pieces and decent performances — performances which could have been great if the film had given the characters more, you know, character."
