= The Mustang =

2019 drama film

- Theatrical release poster
- Directed by: Laure de Clermont-Tonnerre
- Written by: Laure de Clermont-Tonnerre; Mona Fastvold; Brock Norman Brock
- Produced by: Alain Goldman; Molly Hallam
- Starring: Matthias Schoenaerts; Jason Mitchell; Gideon Adlon; Connie Britton; Bruce Dern
- Cinematography: Ruben Impens
- Edited by: Géraldine Mangenot
- Music by: Jed Kurzel
- Production companies: Légende Films; France 3 Cinéma; Umedia; Ufund; Canal+; Cine+; Nexus Factory
- Distributed by: Ad Vitam (France); Sony Pictures Releasing (Belgium); Focus Features (United States); Universal Pictures (International)
- Release dates: January 31, 2019 (Sundance); March 15, 2019 (United States)
- Running time: 96 minutes
- Countries: France; Belgium; United States
- Language: English
- Box office: $6.7 million

The Mustang is a 2019 drama film written by Laure de Clermont-Tonnerre, Mona Fastvold, and Brock Norman Brock, and directed by Clermont-Tonnerre in her feature directorial debut. It stars Matthias Schoenaerts as an incarcerated inmate who participates in a rehabilitation program centered around training wild horses. Jason Mitchell, Gideon Adlon, Connie Britton, and Bruce Dern appear in supporting roles. The Mustang is based on actual rehabilitation programs in several states, including Nevada, where it was filmed.

The film had its world premiere at the Sundance Film Festival on January 31, 2019, and was released in the United States on March 15, 2019, by Focus Features.

== Plot ==
Rounded up by helicopter, thousands of wild mustangs are taken from the wild to help reduce overpopulation. Of these, a few hundred are sent to prisons to be trained and later sold to support the program.

A psychologist interviews Roman Coleman in the Nevada prison he's been transferred to before they reinsert him into the general population. As he isn't good with people, she assigns him to outdoor maintenance. Roman's pregnant, teenaged daughter Martha gives Roman a surprise visit, asking him to sign some papers. Afterward, he tells her not to return.

Roman is a former drug addict who has been incarcerated for twelve years since being convicted in an assault of his domestic partner that left her permanently brain-damaged. Aware of his short temper and violent tendencies, he has resisted efforts to be reintegrated back into society.

While working maintenance, Roman is seen interacting with a 'dangerous' horse, one of the mustangs held for training. He is placed in the rehabilitation program run by rancher Myles that assigns prisoners to train wild mustangs. Each prisoner in the program is given a specific horse to train. They are coached during the twelve weeks they have to complete the training course and bring their horses to a condition to be sold at a prison auction.

Roman initially struggles with the training of his mustang, but under the guidance of Henry, an inmate regarded as the top horse-trainer, he begins to make progress. As the weeks pass, Roman becomes close with the horse, whom he names Marquis, and forms a friendship with Henry.

His daughter Martha returns to get Roman's initials on every page. Discovering she's seeking emancipation to sell the house his mother left them for money to move to the east, he refuses. The anger he feels in that situation carries over into his horse-training. Frustration with Marquis causes him to lose his temper, and he punches the animal repeatedly. Myles kicks him out of the horse-training program and into solitary confinement.

Before a thunderstorm strikes, the horse-training inmates are woken to take the panicked horses undercover for safety. Roman redeems himself by his success in that fraught event. He is released from solitary and allowed to return to the training program. He also joins a restorative justice program within the prison.

Once Roman has returned to his regular cell, his addict cellmate Dan blackmails him (by threatening to harm Martha with outside help) into smuggling the horse tranquilizer ketamine like Henry does. Reluctantly, Roman smuggles small doses of ketamine from the camp.

Shortly after, the mustang program suffers a blow when Dan murders Henry over the ketamine. Roman retaliates by strangling him unconscious before calling in the guards.

The day of the auction arrives, which Roman invites the pregnant Martha to attend with the hope of improving their relationship. While Roman showcases Marquis to the auctioneers, he becomes distracted after he notices Martha is not present. When Marquis is startled by an overhead helicopter, Roman falls off his horse and is nearly trampled as the other trainers restrain the frantic Marquis.

Shortly afterward, Roman learns from Myles that Marquis has been deemed untrainable and will be euthanized. Taking advantage of the prison gates being damaged by the recent thunderstorm, and while Myles distracts the guards, Roman releases Marquis from the corrals, taking the horse outside the prison grounds and setting him free.

Some time later, Roman receives a letter from Martha acknowledging her father's refusal to leave prison. The letter includes a photo of Martha with her son whom she intends to bring to Roman during her next visit with him. After Roman finishes reading the letter, he spots Marquis standing near the prison fence and smiles.

== Cast ==
- Matthias Schoenaerts as Roman Coleman
- Jason Mitchell as Henry Cooper
- Bruce Dern as Myles
- Gideon Adlon as Martha Coleman
- Connie Britton as Psychologist
- Josh Stewart as Dan
- Noel Gugliemi as Roberto
- Thomas Smittle as Tom

== Production ==
In May 2017, it was announced Matthias Schoenaerts and Jason Mitchell had joined the cast of the film. It is the debut film for director Laure de Clermont-Tonnerre, who co-wrote the screenplay with Mona Fastvold and Brock Norman Brock.

The US-French production was led by Canal+, Cine+, alongside Alain Goldman and Molly Hallam serving as a producer and executive producer under their Legende banner. In October 2017, Susan Sarandon, Gideon Adlon, Bruce Dern, Josh Stewart joined the cast of the film. Sarandon later departed from the cast and was replaced by Connie Britton.

Filming took place at the Nevada State Prison. The former penitentiary in Carson City, Nevada, closed in 2012.

== Release ==
It had its world premiere at the Sundance Film Festival on January 31, 2019. It was released in a limited theatrical release on March 15, 2019, and on VOD by Universal Home Entertainment on June 4, 2019.

== Reception ==
=== Box office ===
The Mustang grossed $5.3 million in the United States and Canada, and a worldwide total of $6.7 million.

=== Critical response ===
On review aggregator Rotten Tomatoes, the film holds an approval rating of 95% based on 135 reviews with an average rating of 7.5/10. The site's critical consensus reads "The Mustang finds fresh perspectives in a familiar redemption tale brought brilliantly to life by powerful performances from Bruce Dern and Matthias Schoenaerts." On Metacritic, the film has a weighted average score of 77 out of 100, based on 36 critics, indicating "generally favorable reviews".

== See also ==
- List of films about horses
