= Lady Chatterley's Lover (2022 film) =

2022 film by Laure de Clermont-Tonnerre

- Official release poster
- Directed by: Laure de Clermont-Tonnerre
- Screenplay by: David Magee
- Based on: Lady Chatterley's Lover by D. H. Lawrence
- Produced by: Laurence Mark; Pete Czernin; Graham Broadbent
- Starring: Emma Corrin; Jack O'Connell; Matthew Duckett; Ella Hunt; Faye Marsay; Joely Richardson
- Cinematography: Benoît Delhomme
- Edited by: Géraldine Mangenot; Nina Annan
- Music by: Isabella Summers
- Production companies: 3000 Pictures; Laurence Mark Productions; Blueprint Pictures; HarperCollins
- Distributed by: Netflix
- Release dates: 2 September 2022 (Telluride); 25 November 2022 (United Kingdom/United States); 2 December 2022 (Netflix)
- Running time: 127 minutes
- Countries: United Kingdom; United States
- Language: English

Lady Chatterley's Lover is a 2022 historical romantic drama film directed by Laure de Clermont-Tonnerre from a screenplay by David Magee. It is the second American adaptation and the sixth overall adaptation, based on the novel of the same name by D. H. Lawrence. This is the second adaptation with a female director. The film stars Emma Corrin and Jack O'Connell.

Lady Chatterley's Lover was released in select cinemas on 25 November 2022, before its streaming release on 2 December 2022, by Netflix.

== Plot ==
After marrying the baronet Sir Clifford Chatterley, Constance "Connie" Reid moves from London to the impressive Chatterley estate in Wragby. When her sister Hilda expresses disapproval of the marriage, Connie tells her that she loves Clifford for how progressive he is. They consummate the marriage and Clifford returns to fight in World War I the following day.

Weeks later, Clifford comes home, paralyzed from the waist down, causing him to need full-time care and unable to have an erection. He demands that only Connie help him with his daily acts of living. Clifford rebuffs her attempts to engage in other forms of sex that would pleasure her.

Connie does her best but, over time, the burden of caregiving and starvation from physical and emotional intimacy begin to wear on her. In his grief after losing control over his body, Clifford becomes controlling and focused on how he can amass more power and wealth. All love disappears between them as Clifford grows more and more controlling, making sexist comments and trying to prevent her from leaving the house to visit loved ones or even go on walks. Connie is disgusted to see him subjugating mine workers, their servants, and her. As Clifford wants an heir, he suggests Connie have an affair purely to impregnate her. When her sister Hilda visits, she notices Connie's exhaustion and hires Mrs Bolton to be Clifford's caretaker.

One afternoon after being sent to check on some pheasant chicks at the nearby cottage, Connie meets Oliver Mellors, the reserved lower class gamekeeper who also returned from the war to find his wife had left him. There is an instant connection between them, which soon turns into passionate sex. Using the chicks, reading at the cottage and long walks as her excuses, Connie visits the cottage more and more. She is taken aback by Oliver's surprising tenderness, and they begin a fervent love affair.

Noticing signs of early pregnancy, Connie suggests the idea of traveling to Venice with Hilda in order to have the supposed affair, while the rumour that they are actively trying to conceive spreads through town. Oliver is furious, believing Connie used him to have a child, but she tells him she only wants him. Hilda comes to collect Connie for the trip and is told about Oliver. She is disappointed, but leaves to let Connie spend the night with him. Oliver's wife's new partner, Ned, comes by the cottage, seeking part of Oliver's war pension as they are not yet divorced. There, he finds evidence of Connie.

Ned spreads rumours about Oliver and Connie in the pub. When Clifford hears, he sacks Oliver just as Connie is about to leave for Venice. The pair promise to reunite when they can, and she returns to the manor to confront Clifford, explaining his lack of affection drove her away. Connie reveals she is in love with Oliver and pregnant with his child; Clifford declares he will never give her a divorce. As she leaves London for Venice, Mrs. Bolton promises to put the word out that she is looking for Oliver.

News has spread by word of mouth that a Lady gave up her status and wealth for a gamekeeper because she loves him. After some months in Venice, Connie tires of judgmental gossip and returns to England. A letter arrives to Connie from Oliver, who has since found another house and a job, calling for her to join him in Scotland. She drives there, finds him and they embrace.

== Cast ==
- Emma Corrin as Constance "Connie" Reid, Lady Chatterley
- Jack O'Connell as Oliver Mellors
- Matthew Duckett as Sir Clifford Chatterley
- Joely Richardson as Mrs. Bolton
- Ella Hunt as Mrs. Flint
- Faye Marsay as Hilda
- Anthony Brophy as Sir Malcolm Reid
- Rachel Andrews as Lily
- Eugene O'Hare as Michaelis
- Jonah Russell as Mr Linley
- Nicholas Bishop as Ned
- Alistair Findlay as Sir Geoffrey Chatterley
- Sandra Huggett as Mrs Betts
- Ellie Piercy as Mrs Wheedon
- Marianne McIvor as Mrs Warren
- Christopher Jordan as Mr Betts

Joely Richardson had played Lady Chatterley herself in the 1993 BBC TV serial, Lady Chatterley.

== Filming ==
The majority scenes in this film were shot in the mansion and grounds of the Brynkinalt estate in Chirk, North Wales earlier in 2022. Scenes were also shot at Lake Vyrnwy and Corris in mid Wales.

== Music ==
Isabella Summers composed the film score, with a minimal approach, using just one instrument.

== Reception ==
On the review aggregator website Rotten Tomatoes, 86% of 92 critics' reviews are positive, with an average rating of 7/10. The website's consensus reads: "Arguably the best screen version of this oft-adapted tale, Lady Chatterley's Lover sets itself apart with solid acting and a refreshingly frank treatment of the story's mature themes." Metacritic, which uses a weighted average, assigned the film a score of 67 out of 100, based on 26 critics, indicating "generally favorable" reviews.
