= Miller's Girl =

2024 film by Jade Halley Barlett

- Theatrical release poster
- Directed by: Jade Halley Bartlett
- Written by: Jade Halley Bartlett
- Produced by: Seth Rogen; Evan Goldberg; James Weaver; Josh Fagen; Mary-Margaret Kunze
- Starring: Martin Freeman; Jenna Ortega; Dagmara Domińczyk; Bashir Salahuddin; Gideon Adlon
- Cinematography: Daniel Brothers
- Edited by: Vanara Taing
- Music by: Elyssa Samsel
- Production companies: Good Universe; Point Grey Pictures
- Distributed by: Lionsgate
- Release dates: January 11, 2024 (PSIFF); January 26, 2024 (United States)
- Running time: 93 minutes
- Country: United States
- Language: English
- Budget: $4 million
- Box office: $1.2 million

Miller's Girl is a 2024 American erotic thriller film written and directed by Jade Halley Bartlett in her filmmaking debut. The film stars Jenna Ortega and Martin Freeman as a student and teacher who enter into a complicated relationship after a creative writing assignment.

Miller's Girl was theatrically released in the United States by Lionsgate on January 26, 2024. The film received mixed reviews from critics.

== Plot ==
Cairo Sweet, an 18-year-old girl, lives alone in her wealthy family's mansion in Tennessee. Her attorney parents are away on a business trip while she completes her senior year in high school. Cairo takes the creative writing class of teacher Jonathan Miller, and impresses him with her wide knowledge in literature and her familiarity with Miller's own book, Apostrophes and Ampersands. Miller has not written since he got married and started teaching. His emotionally unavailable wife, Beatrice, is a more successful author who disdains her husband's lack of ambition and failure to write new material.

Cairo has to write a college admission essay for Yale University, with the subject being her "greatest achievement to date", but she cannot find anything worthy to write about. Winnie, Cairo's best friend, tells her to experience the excitement of a teacher–student affair such as she intends to do with the school's baseball coach and physics teacher, Boris Fillmore, who is Miller's best friend. Winnie suggests that Cairo seduce Miller after noticing their intellectual connection and Miller's obvious attraction to her.

Cairo and Miller begin to spend more time together outside class, sharing common interests in novels, poems and Tennessean culture. Miller assigns Cairo to write a short story in the style of her favorite author, and she chooses Henry Miller; despite being reluctant due to the author's provocative style, Miller approves. When he accidentally takes Cairo's cell phone, she asks him to return it personally. Miller arrives at her parents' mansion, where Cairo welcomes him in a sexy dress, and they kiss in the rain. Inspired, she writes an erotic short story about a sexual relationship between a teacher and his student. While Miller reads it alone, he becomes extremely aroused and masturbates to it.

Miller declares the story unacceptable and demands that Cairo rewrite it, citing she was meant to match Henry Miller's writing style, not subject matter. Cairo calls out his cowardice and hypocrisy. Offended by Miller's rejection, Cairo sends the story to the school's vice principal, Joyce Manor, as revenge to expose a possible affair between them. She also takes advantage of Winnie's attraction to her by convincing her to send sexual photos of themselves to Fillmore, leading them to undress and kiss passionately.

Manor questions Cairo and Miller separately about their relationship. Despite claiming that nothing inappropriate has happened between them, Miller has to take full responsibility as the adult in the situation, resulting in his suspension. This causes a rift in his friendship with Fillmore, who blames him for not knowing his limits as a teacher. An argument with Beatrice about what happened also prompts Miller to take his repressed anger out on his wife and point out the toxic nature of their marriage.

Realizing what Cairo's actions have done to Miller, Winnie asks her to withdraw the charges against him, but Cairo refuses, calling Miller's downfall her "greatest achievement to date". Winnie threatens to testify against Cairo, but Cairo blackmails her with the photos they took, which would cause Fillmore's suspension as well. She writes her experiences into her admission essay in the same style Miller used in his book. Miller and Cairo see each other outside before the hearing. She stares at him with an unreadable, teary-eyed expression, before letting out a slight smile.

== Cast ==
- Martin Freeman as Jonathan Albert Miller
- Jenna Ortega as Cairo Sweet
- Bashir Salahuddin as Boris Fillmore
- Gideon Adlon as Winnie Black
- Dagmara Domińczyk as Beatrice June Harker
- Christine Adams as Joyce Manor

== Production ==
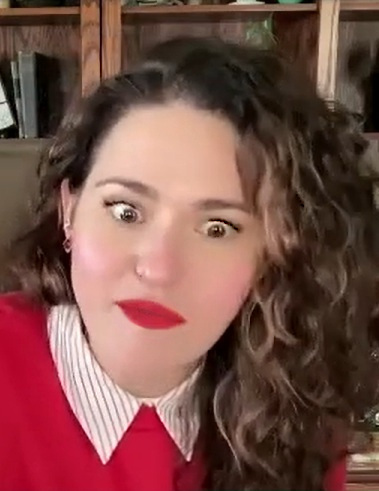
Writer/director Jade Halley Bartlett in 2024

In December 2016, Jade Halley Bartlett's spec script for Miller's Girl was acquired by Seth Rogen's company Point Grey Pictures and listed in the Hollywood Black List of unproduced screenplays.

In September 2022, it was reported that Lionsgate Films had picked up distribution rights for the film, that Bartlett would direct, and that Martin Freeman and Jenna Ortega would star. A week later, it was announced that Gideon Adlon, Bashir Salahuddin, Dagmara Domińczyk, and Christine Adams had joined the cast. That same month principal photography took place in Cartersville, Georgia.

== Release ==
Miller's Girl premiered at Palm Springs Film Festival on January 11, 2024, followed by a release in theaters by Lionsgate on January 26, 2024. It was released on digital formats in the United States on February 16, 2024, followed by a release in the United Kingdom on February 19.

== Reception ==
On the review aggregator website Rotten Tomatoes, 30% of 64 critics' reviews are positive, with an average rating of 5.1/10. The website's consensus reads: "Despite a pair of talented stars and a central concept with a certain amount of real-world relevance, the narratively superficial Miller's Girl rings hollow." Metacritic, which uses a weighted average, assigned the film a score of 41 out of 100, based on 14 critics, indicating "mixed or average" reviews.

CNN's Brian Lowry called the film "a sort-of psychological, semi-erotic drama that, despite its literary pretensions, possesses roughly the intellectual heft of a perfume ad. Dated and creepy in all the wrong ways, it’s a movie that might have escaped derision in the 1980s but deserves to get slapped around today." Kyle Smith of The Wall Street Journal wrote, "At times Miller's Girl has the feel of a stagey, self-consciously literary psychological drama; at others it seems like creepy noir about a femme fatale determined to ruin a randomly chosen man... Only a generous grader would award this script anything better than a D-plus."

Jordan Hoffman writing for The Messenger gave Miller's Girl a score of 6.5 out of 10, calling it "a brooding, bookish and bursting-with-pheromones thriller" but adding, "after a splendid build-up, there is some serious lack of momentum that comes after the release of a narrative turn."
