= Pretty Red Dress =

2022 film set in London

- Directed by: Dionne Edwards
- Written by: Dionne Edwards
- Produced by: Georgia Goggin
- Starring: Natey Jones; Alexandra Burke; Temilola Olatunbosun
- Cinematography: Adam Scarth
- Edited by: Andonis Trattos
- Music by: Brijs
- Production companies: BBC Films; BFI Film Fund; Magellanic Media; Sundance Institute; Teng Teng Films
- Distributed by: BFI Distribution
- Release dates: 9 October 2022 (BFI London); 16 June 2023 (UK)
- Running time: 110 minutes
- Country: United Kingdom
- Language: English
- Box office: $58,659 worldwide

Pretty Red Dress is a 2022 British drama film written and directed by Dionne Edwards. It follows the story of a family of three (father, mother and teenage daughter) after the father is released from prison, and while the mother is auditioning for the part of Tina Turner in a musical. A red dress bought for the part becomes central to the plot. The film is soundtracked to Turner's various hit songs.

== Plot ==
Candice picks up her partner Travis from prison when he is released on parole after a year inside. As soon as he gets in the car, Candice receives a call from her agent to say she has an audition for a role as Tina Turner in a musical. During the journey home, she explains that their teenage daughter, Kenisha, has been threatened with expulsion from school due to her behaviour. Travis meets up with his older brother, Clive, and his friends. Clive offers him a job in his restaurant. One of the other men offers more of the alternative type of work, which presumably led to imprisonment. He declines both jobs.

Looking for an outfit for Candice's audition, the couple see a red dress in a shop window which they like. When they discover its price of £279, which they cannot afford, the shop agrees to hold it for 24 hours. Travis asks Clive about the job offer; the original job has gone, but a kitchen porter role is available, which Travis takes. He buys the dress, which Candice wears and is complimented on during the audition as she progresses to the next stage. Travis becomes obsessed with the dress, and tries it on himself. He applies lipstick, then Kenisha returns early from school. He hastily changes out of the dress but doesn't remove the lipstick. The next time he puts the dress on, Candice returns to find him wearing it. He says he was just "messing about" and wanted to "show [her] later". She takes a photo on her phone, whereupon he tries to wrestle the phone from her to delete it.

Travis finally tears the dress while donning it. It's the day before Candice's next audition, and he can't find a repairer to do a same-day job, so he buys off Kenisha to say she damaged it. At work, Clive sees that Travis is wearing women's underwear when he bends down for something, and it is revealed that he also put on women's clothing when a teenager. Kenisha tells her friend Cicely, who swears on her life not to tell anyone, that her dad sometimes wears her mum's clothes. Kenisha had asked her mum how to approach a boy she fancied, but when her parents see her apparently being intimate with Cicely, Candice assumes it was her rather than a boy to whom she was referring.

At school, Kenisha is taunted for having a supposedly gay father, attacks one of the teasers, and is sent home. Candice blames Travis for Kenisha becoming a lesbian and for her behaviour at school, and asks him to move out and take the dress with him. In a park, Travis changes into the dress and parades in front of four men, who beat him up. In a meeting at the school with both parents to discuss whether Kenisha should be expelled, Travis admits to cross-dressing, says that Kenisha's behaviour is all his fault, and promises to make things right. Kenisha is given one last chance. Candice does not get the part in the musical, but instead forms a Tina Turner cover band. She and Travis get back together. Travis proposes to her and she accepts.

== Cast ==
- Natey Jones as Travis
- Alexandra Burke as Candice, his partner
- Temilola Olatunbosun as Kenisha, their daughter
- Rolan Bell as Clive, Travis's brother
- Ben Caplan as Jim
- Nicholas Bishop as Shaun
- Maria Almeida as Cicely, Kenisha's school friend
- Edwin De La Renta as Fletcher
- Chevone Stewart, Katrina Pollard and Misha Malcolm as backing singers
- Elliot Sumner

== Release ==
The film premiered at the BFI London Film Festival on 9 October 2022 and was released in the UK and Ireland on 16 June 2023.

== Reception ==
=== Box office ===
The film grossed $23,347 across 44 screens in the United Kingdom on its opening weekend, and a total of $58,659 within 20 days of release in that territory.

=== Critical response ===
Critics' reviews were mostly positive, with an 84% approval rate on review aggregator Rotten Tomatoes based on 25 reviews, and average rating of 6.9/10. Metacritic, which uses a weighted average, assigned the film a score of 71 out of 100 based on 8 critics, indicating "generally favorable" reviews.

In a 4-star review for The Guardian, Peter Bradshaw made it his "film of the week" and summarized that the three lead actors gave "terrific performances" to "match this tender drama about masculinity". Writing for The Independent, Clarisse Loughrey described Alexandra Burke's film debut as "one of the smartest music-to-movies leaps in recent history". Though in a 3-star review she also said "what could be truly radical here feels diluted by the film’s more practical efforts to market itself as feel-good fare", but praised the production: "Edwards has shown real confidence with her camera, in how seamlessly her scenes blend from reality and into the quasi-musical space inside Travis and Candice's heads." The Guardian's Mark Kermode also gave a 4-star review in which he praised the cast and Edwards' direction, writing "Pretty Red Dress revels in the power of music to elevate the everyday; to connect us with our emotional lives, reminding us that while things may not always be harmonious, it is possible to dance to different beats without losing your footing."

=== Awards and nominations ===
Year	Event	Award	Nominee	Result	Ref.
2023	British Independent Film Awards	Best Supporting Performance	Alexandra Burke	Nominated	
2023	British Independent Film Awards	Breakthrough Producer	Georgia Goggin	Nominated	
2023	Munich Film Festival	CineVision Award – Best Film by an Emerging Director	Dionne Edwards	Nominated	
2023	Seattle International Film Festival	Grand Jury Prize – Best Feature Film	Dionne Edwards	Nominated	
