= The Truth Is (Alexandra Burke album) =

Studio album by Alexandra Burke
- Released: 16 March 2018
- Recorded: 2013–2018
- Genre: Pop
- Length: 37:47
- Label: Decca
- Producers: Gordon Mills, Jr.; Paul Meehan; Brian Rawling

Alexandra Burke chronology
Renegade (2015)	The Truth Is (2018)

Singles from The Truth Is
- 1. "Shadow" Released: 9 February 2018

The Truth Is is the third studio album by English singer and songwriter Alexandra Burke. It was released on 16 March 2018 through Decca Records. Recording for the album started in 2013 and finished in early 2018. The first single from the album, "Shadow", was released on 9 February to BBC Radio 2, and to digital download and streaming on 23 February. The album entered and peaked at number 16 on the UK Albums Chart, spending only one week in the top 100. This release also returned Burke to the top 10 of Scotland's albums chart after a nine-year absence. The music style of The Truth Is has been described as a "power ballad pop" with reggae, country and soul elements.

== Critical reception ==
Professional ratings
Review scores
Source	Rating
AllMusic	2.5/5 stars
The Arts Desk	2/5 stars
The Guardian	2/5 stars

The Truth Is received negative reviews from music critics. Andy Kellman from AllMusic criticised the lyrics, commenting, "The seasons, the sun, the stars, heat, fire, and assorted bodies of water ("swimming in the shallows," "almost drowned in a sea of lies") are used with such frequency that each nonmetaphorical line is a relief". Isabella Gallagher form The Arts Desk described the music style of the album as "a strange mix of 90s femme-pop that I am accidentally crushing on and cheesy musical-flavoured numbers" and added, "I would call out what the actual truth of The Truth Is - that this is music to not listen to. It's best enjoyed in the background at a low volume". Rachel Aroesti wrote in The Guardian, "the tunes are robust rather than riveting and lyrically myopic, focusing solely on the generic thrills of a nascent relationship, often, for some reason, through the prism of weather-based imagery".

== Track listing ==
The Truth Is – Standard edition
No.	Title	Writer(s)	Producer(s)	Length
1.	"All the Things You Are"	Alexandra Burke; Dee Freer; Gordon Mills Jr	Gordon Mills Jr	3:10
2.	"Shadow"	Paul Meehan; Reign Write; Josh Breaks	Meehan; Brian Rawling	3:23
3.	"The Truth Is"	Burke; Emma Rohan; Mills Jr	Mills Jr; Meehan^{[a]}; Rawling^{[a]}	3:14
4.	"In the Rain" (Metrophonic mix)	Burke; Freer; Mills Jr	Mills Jr; Meehan^{[a]}; Rawling^{[a]}	3:01
5.	"Say We'll Meet Again" (duet with Ronan Keating)	Shane Filan; Andrew Bullimore; Mills Jr; Jim Diguid	Mills Jr; Meehan^{[a]}; Rawling^{[a]}	4:12
6.	"Summer"	Burke; Rohan; Mills Jr	Mills Jr	3:12
7.	"Maybe It's Love"	David Dawood; Natalie Hajjara	Mills Jr	3:24
8.	"All I Need"	Beth Susan Hirsch; Nicolas Jean Michel Godin; Mills Jr	Mills Jr	4:14
9.	"Believe"	Burke; Ras Kassa Amha Shaka Alexander; Jacqueline Velma Leigh; Tyrone Lincoln Charles	Mills Jr	3:13
10.	"You're Worth Holding Onto"	Burke; Freer; Mills Jr	Mills Jr	2:31
11.	"Without You"	Burke; Tanika Bailey; Leigh; Michael Olaniyi AkinKum; Moses Ayo Samels	Mills Jr	4:13
Total length:				37:47

The Truth Is – Japanese edition (bonus tracks)
No.	Title	Writer(s)	Producer(s)	Length
12.	"Hands in Our Pockets"	Burke; Imogen Andrews; Mills Jr	Mills Jr	3:34
13.	"I Have Nothing" (duet with Naoto Kaiho)	David Foster; Linda Thompson		4:54
Total length:				46:15

Notes

- ^a signifies an additional producer

== Charts ==
Chart (2018)	Peak position
Scottish Albums (Official Charts)	8
UK Albums (Official Charts)	16
