= Nicholas Bishop (actor, born 1985) =

British actor

- Born: 1985 (age 40–41)
- Education: Balliol College, Oxford
- Years active: 2007–present

Nicholas Bishop is a British actor. He began his career in theatre. On television, he is known for his role as Maxim Alonso in the first three seasons of the BBC Two and HBO series Industry (2020–). His films include Lady Chatterley's Lover and Pretty Red Dress (both 2022), and The Critic (2023).

== Early life ==
Bishop is fluent in Spanish and Catalan and graduated from Balliol College, Oxford with a degree in English literature.

== Career ==
Bishop was cast as Longaville in Peter Hall's 2008 production of Love's Labour's Lost at the Rose Theatre, Kingston. Bishop then played Froth in Holt's production of Measure for Measure at the Theatre Royal, Plymouth and Peter in The Railway Children at Waterloo Station. Bishop also made guest appearances in the BBC One series Hustle and Cranford.

Bishop made his West End debut when he joined the cast of War Horse at the New London Theatre as Captain Nicholls, taking over the role from Alex Avery in 2011.

Bishop had further stage roles in the 2015 National Theatre productions of Man and Superman with Ralph Fiennes and Three Days in the Country directed by Patrick Marber. This was followed by While the Sun Shines with Tamla Kari in 2016.

In 2017, Bishop played Count Orsino and Dickens in the Royal Shakespeare Company productions of Twelfth Night and A Christmas Carol respectively. This was followed by The Madness of George III, in which Bishop reunited with Mark Gatiss.

Bishop returned to television in 2020 when he began playing Maxim Alonso in the BBC Two and HBO banking drama Industry, a role he would reprise in the second and third series. He appeared in the films Lady Chatterley's Lover as Ned and Pretty Red Dress as Shaun in 2022, and The Critic as Richard Pugh in 2023.

Bishop starred in the Hallmark Channel films A Proposal in Paris (2023) as Sebastian Laurent opposite Alexa PenaVega and An American in Austen as Mr Darcy. Bishop appeared in the 2025 BBC One crime drama This City Is Ours. He has an upcoming role in Nia DaCosta's film Hedda.

== Filmography ==
=== Film ===
Year	Title	Role	Notes
2010	A Great Mistake	Ed	Short film
2016	For Grace	Dr Stevens	Documentary
2018	Albert		Short film
2018	Grub		Short film
2022	Lady Chatterley's Lover	Ned	Netflix film
2022	Pretty Red Dress	Shaun	
2023	The Critic	Richard Pugh	
2025	Hedda		

=== Television ===
Year	Title	Role	Notes
2007	Hustle	Plummy	Episode: "Signing Up to Wealth"
2009	Cell	Agent Chambers	
2009	Locked Up Abroad	Jake Libbon	Episode: "Puerto Vallarta / Mexican Justice"
2009	Cranford	Giacomo	1 episode
2013	Doll & Em	Ferdinand	Episode: "Six"
2014	Drifters	Gregor	Episode: "Rock'n'Roll"
2020–present	Industry	Maxim Alonso	8 episodes
2022	Becoming Elizabeth	Ambassador	Episode: "Necessity Compels Me to Plague You"
2023	A Paris Proposal	Sebastian Laurent	Television film
2024	An American in Austen	Mr Darcy	Television film
2025	This City is Ours	Ricardo	

=== Video games ===
Year	Title	Role	Notes
2009	Wheelman	Anton Gallo	
2017	Star Wars: Battlefront II		

== Stage ==
Year	Title	Role	Notes
2008	Love's Labour's Lost	Longavillie	Rose Theatre, Kingston
2009	Measure for Measure	Froth	Theatre Royal, Plymouth
2010	The Railway Children	Peter	Waterloo Station Theatre, London
2011	War Horse	Captain Nicholls	New London Theatre, London
2012	The Country Wife	Harcourt	Royal Exchange, Manchester
2013	Moby Dick	Starbuck	Arcola Theatre, London
2013	A Tale of Two Cities	Charles Darnay / Defarge	King's Head Theatre, London
2014	Eldorado	Oskar	Arcola Theatre, London
2015	Man and Superman	Duval	National Theatre, London
2015	The Texas Sharpshooter	Banker	Arcola Theatre, London
2015	Three Days in the Country	Matvey	National Theatre, London
2016	While the Sun Shines	Colbert	Theatre Royal, Bath
2016	The Rivals	Faulkland	UK tour
2017	Nell Gwynn	John Dryden	English Touring Theatre
2017	Twelfth Night	Orsino	Royal Shakespeare Theatre, Stratford-upon-Avon
2017	A Christmas Carol	Dickens	Royal Shakespeare Theatre, Stratford-upon-Avon
2018	The Madness of George III	William Pitt	Nottingham Playhouse, Nottingham
