= BT Digital Music Awards =

Annual event in the United Kingdom

The BT Digital Music Awards (DMA) was a British music award ceremony held annually for 10 years from 2002 to 2011 (with no ceremony in 2009). Music industry professionals nominated artists, venues and hardware into the Judge's Choice award categories. The rest of the awards were made up of People's Choice Awards, voted for by the public. The final awards were held at the Camden Roundhouse on 29 September 2011.

== 2002 Awards ==
The inaugural 2002 ceremony was known as the Interactive Music Awards, and was set up and sponsored by BT Openworld. The ceremony was held inside the BT Tower in London. The 2002 winners were:

- Best Pop Artist: Darius
- Best Rock/Indie Artist: Supergrass
- Best Dance/Urban Artist: The Streets
- Artist of the Year: Blue
- Best Major Label: BMG
- Best Independent Label: Ninja Tune
- Best Promotional Campaign: EMI:Chrysalis for Pink Floyd
- Best Use of Broadband: Playlouder @ Glastonbury 2002
- Best Innovation: Shazam
- Best Shop: Groovetech
- People's Choice Award: www.westlife.com

== 2003 Awards ==
The 2003 winners of the Interactive Music Awards were:

- Best Pop Artist: Abs
- Best Rock/Indie Artist: Muse
- Best Dance/Urban Artist: Sasha
- Best Promotional Campaign: Robbie Williams
- Best Use of Mobile: Dizzee Rascal (Boy in Da Corner)
- Best Use of Broadband: Ministry of Sound
- Best Innovation: iTV Videos for Hell Is For Heroes & Robbie Williams
- The Amused & Bemused Award: Simple Kid for the Simple Kid website
- Best Music DVD: U2 (The *Best Of, 1990–2000)
- Best Radio Station Online: Virgin Radio
- Best Interactive TV Programme: TRL (MTV)
- Best Music Video Online: Feeder (Just The Way I'm Feeling)
- Best Web-based Music Game: Project Rockstar v2 game
- Artist of the Year: Will Young
- Best Official website: Westlife
- Best Unofficial site: Radiohead fansite: www.ateaseweb.com

== 2004 Awards ==
In 2004 the ceremony was renamed to the Digital Music Awards. The 2004 award winners were:

- Best Pop Artist: Girls Aloud
- Best Rock Indie Artist: Paul Weller
- Best Dance Artist: Faithless
- Best Urban Artist: Lemar
- Artist of the Year: Will Young
- Best Music Video: The Streets (Blinded by the Lights)
- Best Web-based Music Game: Muse Space Fighter game
- Best Radio Station Online: Virgin Radio
- Best Download Music Service: iTunes
- Best Artist Download: Coldplay (2000 Miles)
- Best unofficial music website: Madonnalicious
- Best official music website: Westlife
- Best Use of Mobile: Orange Fireplayer
- Best Use of Broadband: Video-C Broadband Chart
- Best Digital Promotional Campaign: Kasabian
- Best Innovation: LAUNCHcast and Yahoo! Messenger integration

== 2005 Awards ==
The 2005 award winners included:

- Best pop artist: James Blunt
- Best rock artist: Stereophonics
- Best urban artist: Goldie Lookin Chain
- Favourite download single: U2's Vertigo
- Soundtrack of 2005: The Magic Numbers' Love Me Like You
- Best innovation: Napster To Go
- Best radio station: BBC 6 Music
- Best official site: Coldplay
- Best digital music community: Coldplay
- Best digital marketing campaign EMI (for Coldplay's X&Y album)
- Best online band: Gorillaz
- Best digital music store: iTunes

== 2006 Awards ==
The 2006 award winners included:

- Best Pop Artist: Lily Allen
- Best Rock Artist: Muse
- Best Unofficial Music Site: Muse
- Best Use of Mobile: Thom Yorke
- Best Artist Campaign: Thom Yorke
- Best Urban Artist: Lemar
- Best Blog: Mike Skinner
- Best Artist Promotion: The White Stripes
- Pioneer Award: Peter Gabriel

== 2007 Awards ==
The 2007 award winners included:

- Best pop artist: Natasha Bedingfield
- Best band: Muse
- Best urban act: Lemar
- Best electronic artist: The Chemical Brothers
- Best radio station: BBC 6 Music
- Artist of the year: Funeral for a Friend
- Best mobile campaign: Ludacris
- Best official music website: Keane

== 2008 Awards ==
The 2008 award winners included:

- Best pop artist: Kylie Minogue
- Best innovation: Kylie Minogue (for the Kylie Konnect site)
- Artist of the year: Radiohead
- Best rock/indie artist: Coldplay
- Best official music website: Coldplay
- Best urban artist: Wiley
- Best video podcast: The Zutons
- Best breakthrough artist: Vampire Weekend

== 2009 Awards ==
There was no award ceremony in 2009.

== 2010 Awards ==
The 2010 award winners were:

- Best Male: Robbie Williams
- Best Female: Cheryl Cole
- Best Group: JLS
- Best Song: Cheryl Cole (Fight For This Love)
- Best Video: JLS
- Artist of the Year: Gorillaz
- Best Artist Promotion: Gorillaz
- Breakthrough Artist: Professor Green
- Best Newcomer: Tinie Tempah
- Best Independent Artist: Dizzee Rascal
- Best International Artist: Lady Gaga
- Best Blog: Music Fix
- Best Official Site: Muse
- Best Fan Site: Muselive.com
- Best Event: Nokia presents Rihanna Live
- Best Place to Discover Music: BBC Introducing
- Best Radio Show or Podcast: Buxton's Big Mixtape show and podcast

== 2011 Awards ==
The 2011 award winners were:

- Best male artist: Olly Murs
- Best female artist: Jessie J
- Best group: JLS
- Best international artist or group: Bruno Mars
- Best independent artist or group: Adele
- Best newcomer: Jessie J
- Best song: Jessie J ft B.o.B (Price Tag)
- Best video: JLS with Tinie Tempah (Eyes Wide Shut)
- Best Official Site: Coldplay
- Best Fan Site: Coldplaying.com
- Best place to discover music: Radio 1 online
- Best place to hear music: YouTube
- Best place to buy music: iTunes
