= Dionne Edwards =

British filmmaker

Dionne Edwards is a British filmmaker and screenwriter, of mixed Jamaican and Nigerian heritage, best known for her short film We Love Moses.

== Early life ==
While growing up Edwards spent time in the foster-care system. Edwards studied film and TV production at the University of Westminster, following which she spent a year working at Working Title Films as a Working Title Action! Intern. Missing out on a place at the National Film and Television School, she went on to work for the Rio Cinema in Dalston, East London, while continuing to work on her own films.

== Career ==
In 2011, Edwards co-founded production company Teng Teng Films alongside producer Georgia Goggin. It has produced four of her short films, including her breakthrough short film We Love Moses. Hi, Miss! (2014) is a short film written and directed by Edwards, which explores the relationship between two quarrelling teenage photography students. It won the Audience Award at the East End Film Festival in 2015. We Love Moses (2016) is a short film written and directed by Edwards, which explores a 12-year-old's secret crush on her brother's best friend, both of whose lives are dramatically changed in a single moment in a shocking plot twist. The film explores girlhood, relationships and sexuality. Edwards was mentored on the project by Desiree Akhavan as part of the BFI Flare LGBT Filmmakers’ Mentorship scheme and was pre-funded by Film London, as part of London Calling Plus. Screened at more than 50 festivals, it picked up nine awards including Best British Short Winner at the 2017 Iris Prize and Short Film of the Year at the Critics’ Circle Film Awards. It was licensed for broadcast by Cine+, Canal+ and HBO.

In 2018, Edwards directed That Girl, part of drama anthology On the Edge, a Channel 4 mini-series that explored the criminal justice system from the perspective of a criminal, a witness and the victim. In 2019, she was an assistant director to Reinaldo Marcus Green on the Drake revival of the Channel 4 series Top Boy, she went on to direct two episodes of the BBC's Soon Gone: A Windrush Chronicle, which explored the experience of a family of Caribbean origin over four generations. In 2019, she was named a Screen International Star of Tomorrow. In 2020 she was an Sundance Adobe Fellow. She co-wrote an episode of Netflix's The Bastard Son & The Devil Himself with creator Joe Barton.

== Filmography ==
=== Films ===
- Pretty Red Dress (2023)

=== Short films ===
- We Love Moses (2016)
- Hi, Miss! (2014)
- Got Got (2013)

=== TV ===
- That Girl (2018)
- Soon Gone: A Windrush Chronicle (2019)
- The Bastard Son & The Devil Himself (2022)
