= Star for a Night (British TV series) =

- Genre: Talent show
- Presented by: Jane McDonald
- Judges: Nigel Martin-Smith; Barbara Windsor
- Country of origin: United Kingdom
- Original language: English
- No. of series: 2
- No. of episodes: 24 (inc. pilot and 1 special)

Production
- Running time: 50 minutes 100 minutes (Final)
- Production company: Mentorn

Original release
- Network: BBC One
- Release: 26 June 1999 – 20 October 2001

Star for a Night is a British television talent show. It was originally commissioned as a one-off special on 26 June 1999, but was soon commissioned as a series and ran from 8 January 2000 to 20 October 2001. It was presented by Jane McDonald. The judges were Nigel Martin-Smith and Barbara Windsor.

== Transmissions ==
Series	Start date	End date	Episodes
Pilot	26 June 1999		1
1	8 January 2000	21 October 2000	11
Special	20 January 2001		1
2	3 March 2001	20 October 2001	13
