= List of songs recorded by Alexandra Burke =

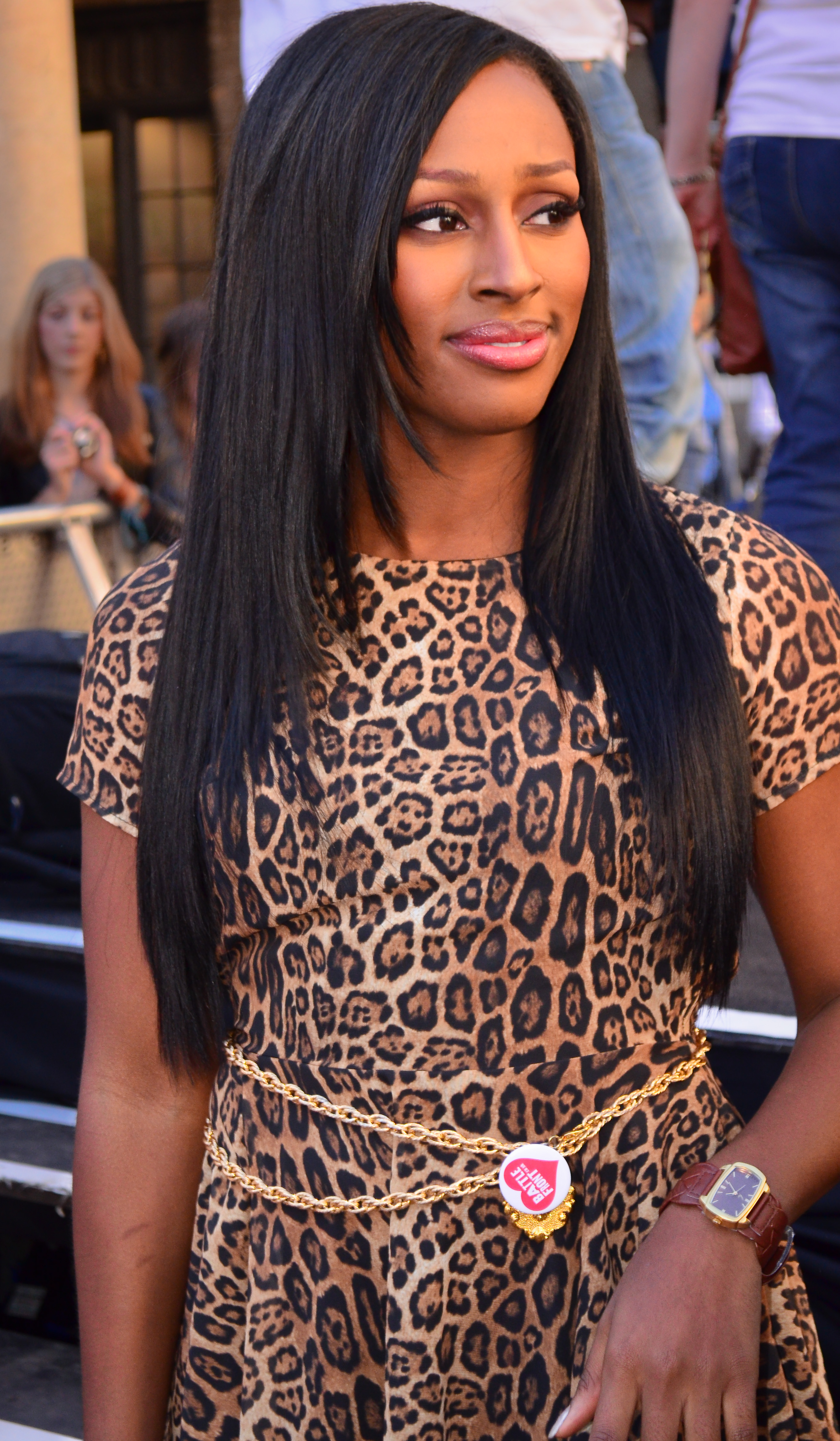
Alexandra Burke in October 2011

British singer Alexandra Burke has recorded songs for two studio albums. She has collaborated with other artists for duets and featured songs on her albums. Burke has also contributed vocals for charity singles. After she won the fifth series of The X Factor in December 2008, Burke signed a £1 million recording contract with Syco Music. Her first single, "Hallelujah", was made available to purchase the day after she won the singing competition on 14 December 2008.

She began to work with writers for her debut album, Overcome, which was released on 19 October 2009. The album's second single, "Bad Boys" featuring Flo Rida, was released in the same month to coincide with Overcome. American singer-songwriter Ne-Yo co-wrote two songs for the album, "Good Night Good Morning" and "Nothing But the Girl"; he appeared as a featured artist on the former. "Good Night Good Morning" was written in collaboration with Norwegian production team Stargate, while "Nothing But the Girl" was co-written with Stargate along with Chase and Status. British singer-songwriter Pixie Lott received writing credits for the song "You Broke My Heart", while Moroccan-Swedish songwriter RedOne wrote and produced three songs for the album, "The Silence", "Broken Heels" and "Dumb". The re-release of Overcome in December 2010 included new songs which were not on the original album. They included collaborations with Cobra Starship on "What Happens on the Dancefloor" and Laza Morgan on "Start Without You". Burke stated that a newly recorded vocal version of "The Silence" was released as a promotional single for the album.

Burke revealed that she would be "getting down and dirty" on her second studio album, Heartbreak on Hold (2012), and that her future music would be "fiercer and sexier". She was involved with writing two songs on the album; "What Money Can't Buy" and the lead single "Elephant" featuring DJ Erick Morillo. Burke collaborated with a new set of writers and producers, none of whom were involved with Overcome. Autumn Rowe co-wrote the song "Fire", which was produced by iSHi. Cutfather and Jason Gill co-wrote and produced three songs for Heartbreak on Hold, "This Love Will Survive", "Between the Sheets" and the second single "Let It Go". DJ Smash and DJ Antoine collaborated for song "Tonight", while English DJ Michael Woods co-wrote and produced "Daylight Robbery". The deluxe edition of the album featured two additional songs, "Devil in Me" and "Beating Still"; Burke also recorded different vocals for acoustic versions of "Heartbreak on Hold" and "Let It Go".

In October 2012, Burke confirmed that she is in the process of recording songs for her third studio album, as well as an R&B album for her American debut, both due for release in 2013. In December 2012, Burke released her first Extended play (EP) entitled Christmas Gift. It contains two songs: a cover of "Silent Night" and an original track written by Burke entitled "Christmas Time".

== Songs ==
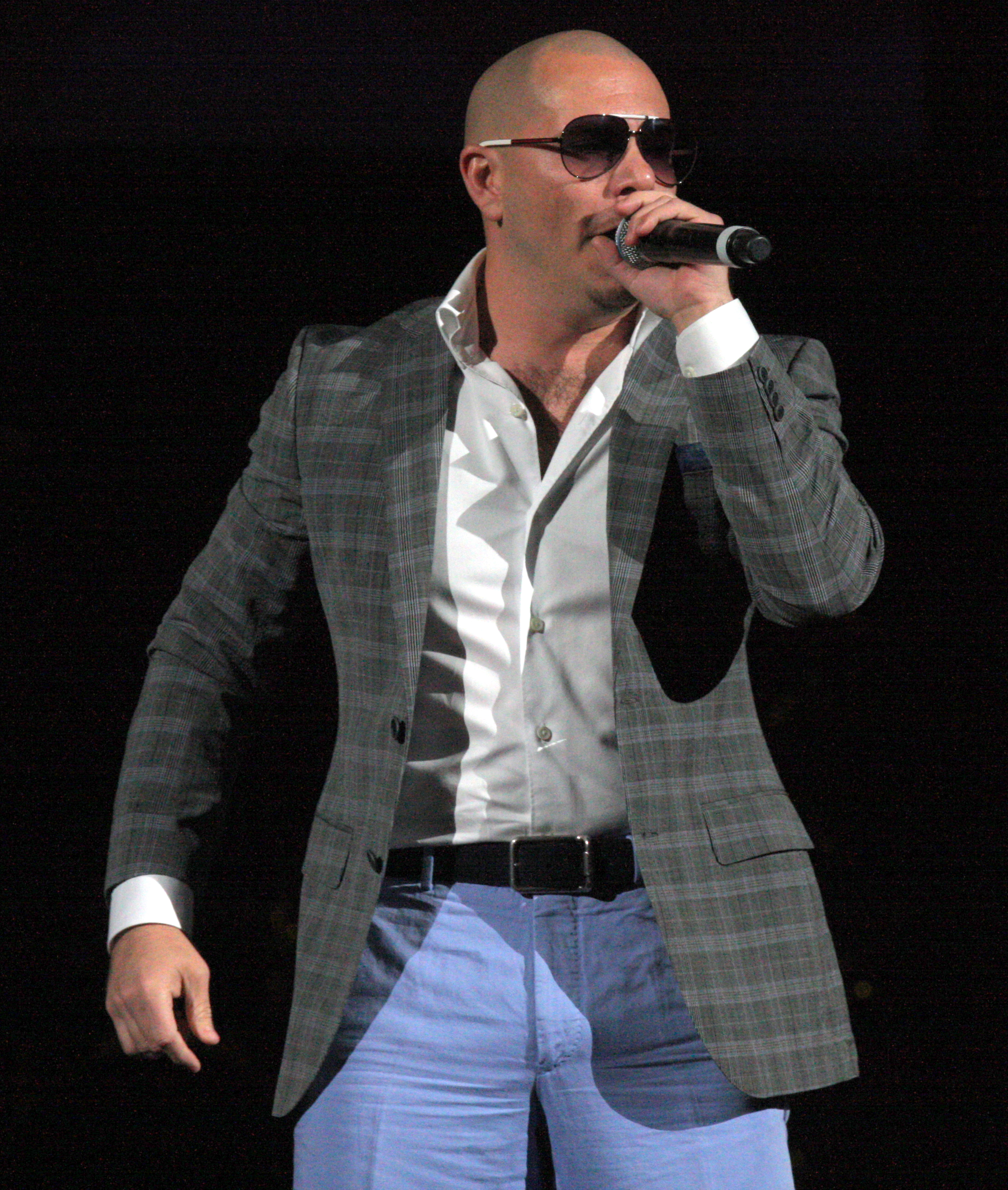
Pitbull appeared as a featured artist on the remix single release of "All Night Long".

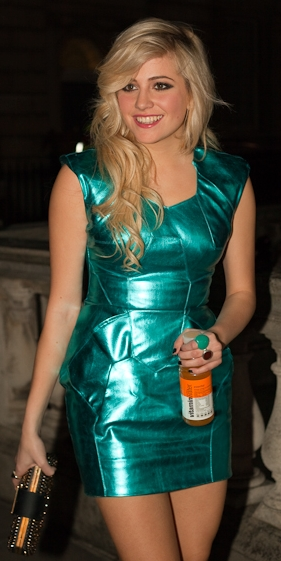
British singer-songwriter Pixie Lott co-wrote the song "You Broke My Heart".

Key
†	Indicates single release
#	Indicates promotional single release
‡	Indicates song written solely by Burke

Song	Artist(s)	Writer(s)	Album(s)	Year	Ref.
"All Night Long"	Alexandra Burke	James Scheffer; Louis Biancaniello; Richard Butler Jr. Sam Watters	Overcome	2009	
"All Night Long" † (Remix)	Alexandra Burke featuring Pitbull	Armando Pérez; James Scheffer; Louis Biancaniello; Richard Butler Jr. Sam Watters	Single release only	2010	
"Bad Boys" †	Alexandra Burke featuring Flo Rida	Alexander James; Larry Summerville Jr. Lauren Evans; Melvin K. Watson Jr. Michael Busbee; Tramar Dillard	Overcome	2009	
"Bad Boys" (No rap version)	Alexandra Burke	Alexander James; James Ryan; Larry Summerville Jr. Lauren Evans; Melvin K. Watson Jr. Michael Busbee	Radio airplay only	2009	
"Beating Still"	Alexandra Burke	Carl Ryden; Cozi Costi; Nina Woodford	Heartbreak on Hold	2012	
"Before the Rain"	Alexandra Burke	AJ Junior; Bilal Hajji; Gabe Saporta; Nadir Khayat; Savan Kotecha	Overcome	2010	
"Between the Sheets"	Alexandra Burke	Brittany Burton; Dee Adam; Josh Wilkinson	Heartbreak on Hold	2012	
"Broken Heels" †	Alexandra Burke	Bilal Hajji; Nadir Khayat; Savan Kotecha	Overcome	2009	
"Bury Me (6 Feet Under)"	Alexandra Burke	Andrea Martin; Hitesh Ceon; Kim Ofstad; Tor Erik Hermansen	Overcome	2009	
"Christmas Time"	Alexandra Burke	Alexandra Burke	Christmas Gift	2012	
"Dangerous"	Alexandra Burke	Andrea Martin; Hitesh Ceon; Kim Ofstad	Overcome	2009	
"Daylight Robbery"	Alexandra Burke	Gavin Jones; Marlene Strand; Michael Woods	Heartbreak on Hold	2012	
"Devil in Me"	Alexandra Burke	Bryn Christopher; Pete Martin	Heartbreak on Hold	2012	
"Dumb"	Alexandra Burke	Bilal Hajji; Martin Kierszenbaum; Nadir Khayat; Savan Kotecha	Overcome	2009	
"Elephant" †	Alexandra Burke featuring Erick Morillo	Alexandra Burke; Brittany Burton; Erick Morillo; Harry Romero; Jose Nuñez; Josh Wilkinson	Heartbreak on Hold	2012	
"Everybody Hurts" †	Helping Haiti Artists	Bill Berry; Michael Stipe; Mike Mills; Peter Buck	Charity record	2010	
"Fire"	Alexandra Burke	Autumn Rowe; Charlie Bernardo; Eshraque "iSHi" Mughal	Heartbreak on Hold	2012	
"Good Night Good Morning"	Alexandra Burke featuring Ne-Yo	Mikkel S. Eriksen; Shaffer Smith; Tor Erik Hermansen	Overcome	2009	
"Gotta Go"	Alexandra Burke	Aeon Manahan; Herbie Crichlow; Savan Kotecha; Wayne Wilkins	Overcome	2009	
"Hallelujah" †	Alexandra Burke	Leonard Cohen	Overcome	2009	
"Heartbreak on Hold"	Alexandra Burke	David Gamson; Erika Nuri	Heartbreak on Hold	2012	
"Heartbreak on Hold" (Acoustic version)	Alexandra Burke	David Gamson; Erika Nuri	Heartbreak on Hold	2012	
"Hero" †	The X Factor Finalists 2008	Mariah Carey; Walter Afanasieff	Charity record	2008	
"It's Over"	Alexandra Burke	Leonard Cohen	Overcome	2009	
"Let It Go" †	Alexandra Burke	Belle Humble; Jason Gill; Mich Hansen	Heartbreak on Hold	2012	
"Let It Go" (Acoustic version)	Alexandra Burke	Belle Humble; Jason Gill; Mich Hansen	Heartbreak on Hold	2012	
"Love You That Much"	Alexandra Burke	Brittany Burton; Fred Falke	Heartbreak on Hold	2012	
"Nothing But the Girl"	Alexandra Burke	Mikkel S. Eriksen; Will Kennard; Shaffer Smith; Tor Erik Hermansen; Will Kennard	Overcome	2009	
"Oh La La"	Alexandra Burke	Crystal Waters; Gavin Jones; Ivar Lisinski; Marlene Strand; Neal Brian Conway	Heartbreak on Hold	2012	
"Overcome"	Alexandra Burke	Louis Biancaniello; Sam Watters	Overcome	2009	
"Perfect"	Alexandra Burke	Ari Levine; Peter Hernandez; James Fauntleroy II; Philip Lawrence	Overcome	2010	
"The Silence"	Alexandra Burke	Bilal Hajji; Nadir Khayat; Savan Kotecha	Overcome	2009	
"The Silence (New Single Mix)" #	Alexandra Burke	Bilal Hajji; Nadir Khayat; Savan Kotecha	Overcome	2010	
"Silent Night"	Alexandra Burke	Franz Xaver Gruber; Joseph Mohr	Christmas Gift	2012	
"Sitting on Top of the World"	Alexandra Burke	Brittany Burton; Dee Adam; George Tizzard; Josh Wilkinson; Rick Parkhouse	Heartbreak on Hold	2012	
"Start Without You" †	Alexandra Burke featuring Laza Morgan	Julian Bunetta; Kristian Lundin; Nadir Khayat; Savan Kotecha	Overcome	2010	
"They Don't Know"	Alexandra Burke	Brian Kennedy Seals; James Fauntleroy II	Overcome	2009	
"This Love Will Survive"	Alexandra Burke	Daniel Davidson; Jason Gill; Mich Hansen; Sonia Clark	Heartbreak on Hold	2012	
"Tonight"	Alexandra Burke	Andrey Shirman; Antoine Konrad; Fabio Antonialli; Lucas Scon; Pablo Rodriguez; Thomas Troelsen	Heartbreak on Hold	2012	
"What Happens on the Dancefloor"	Alexandra Burke featuring Cobra Starship	AJ Junior; Bilal Hajji; Gabe Saporta; Nadir Khayat; Savan Kotecha	Overcome	2010	
"What Money Can't Buy"	Alexandra Burke	Alexandra Burke; Ben Adams	Heartbreak on Hold	2012	
"You Broke My Heart"	Alexandra Burke	Steve Booker; Niara Scarlett; Victoria Lott	Overcome	2009	
