= Alexandra Burke discography =

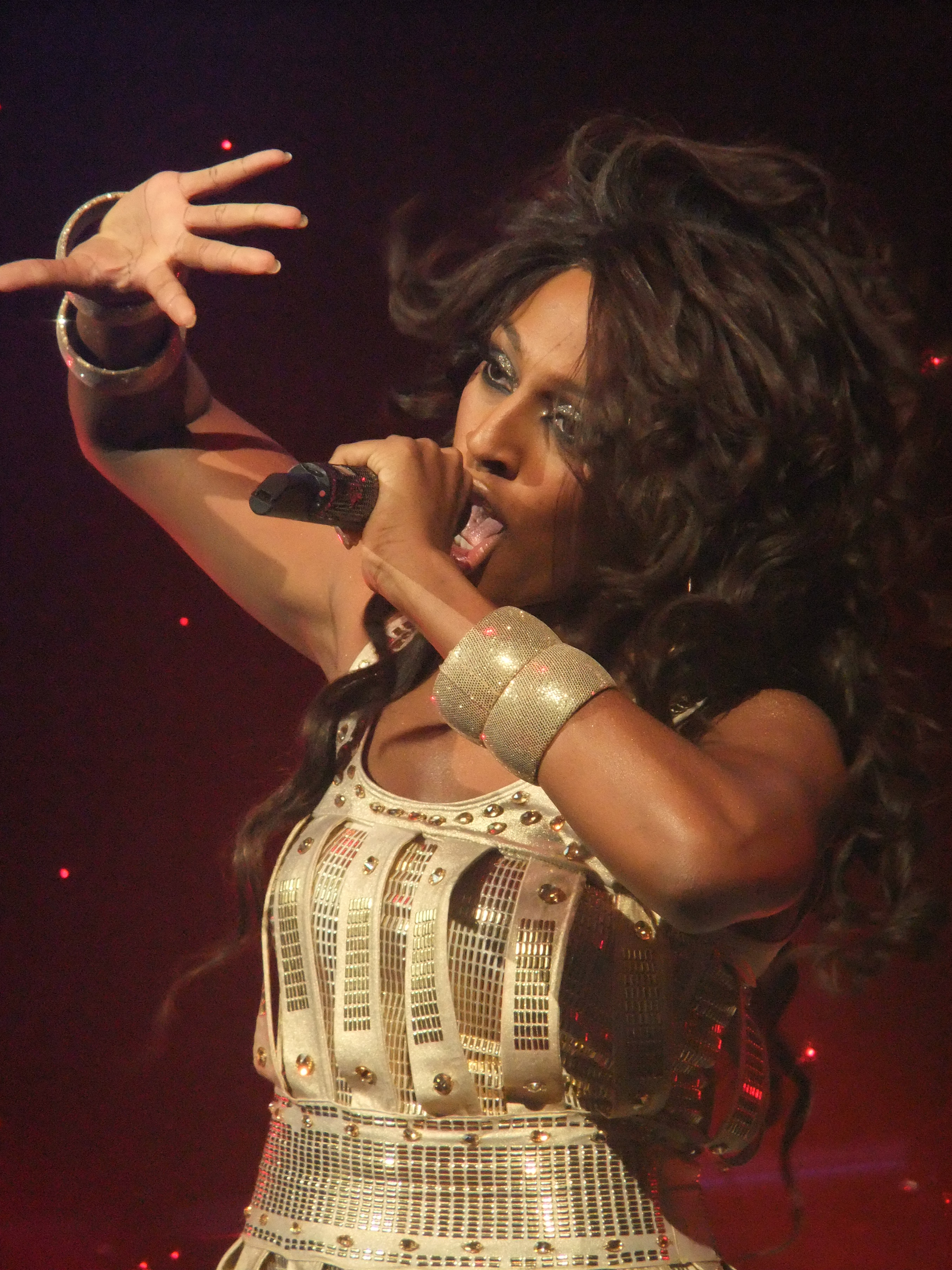
- Burke performing at her All Night Long Tour in 2011
- Studio albums: 3
- Singles: 15
- Music videos: 12

The discography of British R&B and pop recording singer Alexandra Burke consists of three studio albums, fourteen singles as a main artist, one as a featured artist and twelve music videos.

Alexandra made her debut in 2008 when she auditioned for British reality talent show, The X Factor during the fifth series, and ultimately won the show on 12 December 2008. During the series she dueted with Beyoncé Knowles on Knowles' "Listen". Due to winning the show, she won a record deal with Sony BMG and Syco Music and released her debut single, "Hallelujah". "Hallelujah" peaked at number-one on the UK Singles Chart and the Irish Singles Chart. The song became the current European record holder for single sales over a period of 24 hours, selling 105,000 copies in one day. It was also the top-selling song of the year in the UK, and became the 2008 UK Christmas number-one single. By January 2009, UK sales of Burke's version had passed one million copies, a first for a British female soloist. The music video for the song was directed by Max and Dania who directed the charity single Burke released with fellow X Factor Finalists 2008, "Hero" which also charted at number-one on the UK Singles Chart and Irish Singles Chart.

Burke returned in late 2009 with follow-up single, "Bad Boys" which featured vocals from American rapper, Flo Rida. She performed the song on the first live show of the sixth series of The X Factor. The R&B single debuted at number-one on the UK Singles Chart and Irish Singles Chart as well as Burke gaining international success with the single. "Bad Boys" went on to gain a Platinum certification and Burke was nominated for a BRIT Award, it was the second time Burke was nominated for the Best British Single, first time with "Hallelujah". In the UK, "Bad Boys" is the 18th biggest download of all time.

She released her debut album Overcome in October 2009. It was described as "edgy" and "beaty". The album was said to resemble the style of artists such as Rihanna or Lady Gaga. Upon the release of the album, the album went straight to number one on the UK Albums Chart selling 132,065 in its first week. Its first-week numbers were the fourth largest first-week sales by a female artist in 2009 behind releases by Susan Boyle, Lily Allen and Leona Lewis and was the twenty-second best-selling album of 2009, and the forty-third best-selling album of 2010. The album spent 60 weeks on the UK Albums Chart and has been certified double platinum by the British Phonographic Industry (BPI) for shipments over 600,000 copies. "Broken Heels" was released as the album third single and "All Night Long" featuring Pitbull as the fourth. "All Night Long" received a platinum certification and Burke was nominated for another BRIT Award in 2010. "Start Without You" was released in mid-2010 and the song went on to top the UK Singles Chart, and "The Silence" was released as the final single from the album.

Work began in 2011 on a second studio album, titled Heartbreak on Hold, which was released on 4 June 2012. The lead single, "Elephant"—featuring Erick Morillo—was released on 11 March 2012 through RCA Records, where it debuted at number three in the United Kingdom; marking Burke's sixth top ten single as a solo artist. A second single, "Let It Go" was released and peaked at number 33. The album then debuted and peaked at number 18.

Burke released her third studio album, The Truth Is, through Decca Records on 16 March 2018. It was preceded by lead single "Shadow".

== Albums ==
=== Studio albums ===
List of albums, with selected chart positions
Title	Details	Peak chart positions										Sales	Certifications
Title	Details	UK	AUT	BEL	GER	JPN	IRE	KOR (Int.)	NLD	SCO	SWI	Sales	Certifications
Overcome	Released: 19 October 2009; Label: Syco, Epic; Formats: CD, digital download	1	54	73	60	46	2	36	61	1	54	World: 1,500,000; UK: 821,189	BPI: 2× Platinum; IRMA: 2× Platinum
Heartbreak on Hold	Released: 4 June 2012; Label: RCA; Formats: CD, digital download	18	—	—	—	—	27	—	—	20	—		
The Truth Is	Released: 16 March 2018; Label: Decca; Formats: CD, digital download	16	—	—	—	—	—	—	—	8	—		
"—" denotes singles that did not chart or were not released

=== Compilation albums ===
Title	Compilation details
Hallelujah	Released: 25 June 2021; Label: Sony Music UK; Format: Digital download

== Extended plays ==
List of extended plays
Title	Extended play details
Christmas Gift	Released: 23 December 2012; Label: RCA; Formats: digital download
#NewRules	Released: 30 August 2013; Label: self-released; Formats: digital download
Renegade	Released: 27 April 2015; Label: self-released; Formats: digital download

== Singles ==
=== As lead artist ===
List of singles, as lead artist, with selected chart positions and certifications, showing year released and album name
Title	Year	Peak chart positions										Sales	Certifications	Album
Title	Year	UK	AUT	BEL (FL)	GER	IRE	KOR (Int.)	NLD	SCO	SWE	SWI	Sales	Certifications	Album
"Hallelujah"	2008	1	53	—	—	1	—	—	1	—	—		BPI: 3× Platinum; BVMI: Gold	Overcome
"Bad Boys" (featuring Flo Rida)	2009	1	22	12	14	1	41	8	1	6	12	UK: 814,000	BPI: Platinum; GLF: 2× Platinum	Overcome
"Broken Heels"	2010	8	—	—	—	5	—	—	7	—	—		BPI: Gold	Overcome
"All Night Long" (solo or featuring Pitbull)	2010	4	—	— (Note: "All Night Long" did not enter the Ultratop 40, but peaked at number 7 on the Ultratip Bubbling Under chart.)	60	1	96	24	3	57	60	UK: 314,000	BPI: Gold; GLF: Platinum	Overcome
"Start Without You" (featuring Laza Morgan)	2010	1	—	— (Note: "Start Without You" did not enter the Ultratop 50, but peaked at number 10 on the Ultratip Bubbling Under chart.)	—	5	46	77	1	—	—	UK: 305,000	BPI: Silver	Overcome
"The Silence"	2010	16	—	—	—	30	—	—	16	—	66			Overcome
"Elephant" (featuring Erick Morillo)	2012	3	—	43	—	7	70	—	2	—	—	UK: 80,012; KOR: 18,892		Heartbreak on Hold
"Let It Go"	2012	33	—	—	—	41	23	—	27	—	—	KOR: 17,000		Heartbreak on Hold
"Shadow"	2018	—	—	—	—	—	—	—	—	—	—			The Truth Is
"Naturally" (featuring Beenie Man)	2020	—	—	—	—	—	—	—	—	—	—			Non-album single
"—" denotes singles that did not chart or were not released

=== As featured artist ===
List of singles as featured artist, showing year released and album name
Title	Year	Album
"Solo Pido" (with Lil' Eddie)	2022	non album single

=== Promotional singles ===
List of singles as featured artist, showing year released and album name
Title	Year	Album
"Where Do Hearts Go"	2014	Non-album single
"Renegade"	2015	Renegade
"Silent Night"	2020	Non-album single
"Game of Love"	2023	Pretty Red Dress

=== Charity singles ===
List of charity singles, with selected chart positions and certifications, showing year released and album name
Single	Year	Peak chart positions						Certifications	Notes
Single	Year	UK	AUT	GER	IRE	SWE	SWI	Certifications	Notes
"Hero" (as part of The X Factor Finalists 2008)	2008	1	—	—	1	—	—	BPI: 2× Platinum	To raise funds for the Help for Heroes and The Royal British Legion charities.
"Everybody Hurts" (as part of Helping Haiti)	2010	1	23	16	1	21	16	BPI: Platinum	To raise funds for victims of the 2010 Haiti earthquake.

== Other charted songs ==
List of singles, with selected chart positions, showing year charted and album name
Title	Year	Peak		Sales	Album
Title	Year	UK	KOR (Int.)	Sales	Album
"Good Night Good Morning" (featuring Ne-Yo)	2009	129	46		Overcome
"Heartbreak on Hold"	2012	—	65	KOR: 10,539	Heartbreak on Hold

== Music videos ==
List of singles, with selected chart positions, showing year charted and album name
Title	Year	Director
"Hero"	2008	Max and Dania
"Hallelujah"	2008	Max and Dania
"Bad Boys"	2009	Bryan Barber
"Broken Heels"	2009	Frank Borin
"Everybody Hurts"	2010	Joseph Kahn
"All Night Long"	2010	Dale "Rage" Resteghini
"Start Without You"	2010	Max and Dania
"The Silence"	2010	Nzingha Stewart
"Elephant"	2012	Amit & Naroop
"Let It Go"	2012	Ben Peters
"Renegade"	2015	
"Shadow"	2018	
