= All Night Long Tour =

2011 concert tour by Alexandra Burke

- Tour by Alexandra Burke
- Promotional poster for the tour
- Location: United Kingdom; Ireland
- Associated album: Overcome
- Start date: 14 January 2011
- End date: 14 August 2011
- Legs: 1
- No. of shows: 35

The All Night Long Tour is the debut concert tour by British pop/R&B singer Alexandra Burke. It is Burke's first concert tour which is to promote her debut studio album Overcome. The tour kicked off in Wales on 14 January 2011 and finished on 24 June 2011 in Ireland. The tour will visit various cities across the United Kingdom including Belfast, Dublin, Glasgow, London and Manchester. The dates for the tour was officially revealed on ITV's Daybreak website on 7 September 2010.

Inspired by musical acts such as Michael Jackson and Beyoncé, The All Night Long Tour began a year and three months after the release of the supporting album Overcome. New up and coming acts Parade and Carrie Mac were announced as the supporting acts. The set list of the tour consisted of songs from Overcome, as well as covering "Closer" by Ne-Yo, "Survivor"/"Bootylicious"/"Independent Women" by Destiny's Child and "Listen" by Beyoncé.

== Background ==
The tour was officially announced in September 2010 during an interview with Irish channel After Dark. It was her first headlining tour; she had previously performed on The X Factor tour and had been asked by Beyoncé Knowles to support the European leg of her I Am... Tour.

Speculation whether Burke would go on tour began in January 2010, but she stated in various interviews that she playing various summer festivals in the UK, but would not go on tour until 2010 because she did not want to perform a load of cover songs and that she wanted enough material so that she could perform her own songs. In May 2010, Burke began her tour plans and confirmed that she would be touring the following year, with tour dates being announced at the end of the current year. During her interview with After Dark she stated "I have major ideas for it and I want it to be the most incredible thing known to man, but it's going to take a lot of work." The show on 14 February in The Brighton Centre was different due to it being Valentine's Day. Tickets for show at the Oasis Leisure Centre had sold out.

== Supporting acts ==
1. Parade
2. Carrie Mac
3. Olly Murs

== Setlist ==
1. "Broken Heels"
2. "Nothing But the Girl"
3. "Dumb"
4. "Start Without You"
5. "Hello Good Morning" (Dancers Interlude)
6. "Perfect"
7. "Overcome"
8. "Closer" (Ne-Yo cover)
9. "Hallelujah"
10. "Good Night Good Morning"
11. Destiny's Child medley: "Survivor" / "Bootylicious" / "Listen" / "Independent Women"
12. "Dangerous"
13. "All Night Long"
14. "The Silence"
15. "Bad Boys"

== Tour dates ==
Date	City	Country	Venue
Europe
14 January 2011	Rhyl	Wales	Pavilion Theatre
16 January 2011	Belfast	Northern Ireland	Waterfront Hall
17 January 2011	Dublin	Ireland	Grand Canal Theatre
18 January 2011	Belfast	Northern Ireland	Waterfront Hall
20 January 2011	Glasgow	Scotland	Clyde Auditorium
21 January 2011	Harrogate	England	Harrogate International Centre
24 January 2011	Swindon	England	Oasis Leisure Centre
25 January 2011	Bristol	England	Colston Hall
27 January 2011	Plymouth	England	Plymouth Pavilions
28 January 2011	Cardiff	Wales	Cardiff International Arena
29 January 2011	Birmingham	England	National Indoor Arena
31 January 2011	Nottingham	England	Royal Concert Hall
1 February 2011	Sheffield	England	Sheffield City Hall
3 February 2011	Newcastle	England	Newcastle City Hall
4 February 2011	Manchester	England	Manchester Apollo
5 February 2011	Manchester	England	Manchester Apollo
7 February 2011	Blackpool	England	Blackpool Winter Gardens
8 February 2011	Liverpool	England	Echo Arena
10 February 2011	London	England	Hammersmith Apollo
11 February 2011	London	England	IndigO2
12 February 2011	Bournemouth	England	Bournemouth International Centre
14 February 2011	Brighton	England	The Brighton Centre
15 February 2011	Wolverhampton	England	Wolverhampton Civic Hall
16 February 2011	Margate	England	Winter Gardens
18 February 2011	Oxford	England	New Theatre Oxford
19 February 2011	Bridlington	England	The Spa
21 February 2011	Sunderland	England	Sunderland Empire
22 February 2011	Doncaster	England	The Dome
23 February 2011	Southend-on-Sea	England	Cliffs Pavilion
24 February 2011	Ipswich	England	Regent Theatre
10 July 2011	Berkshire	England	Henley Festival
