= Denroy Morgan =

Jamaican American reggae artist (1946–2022)

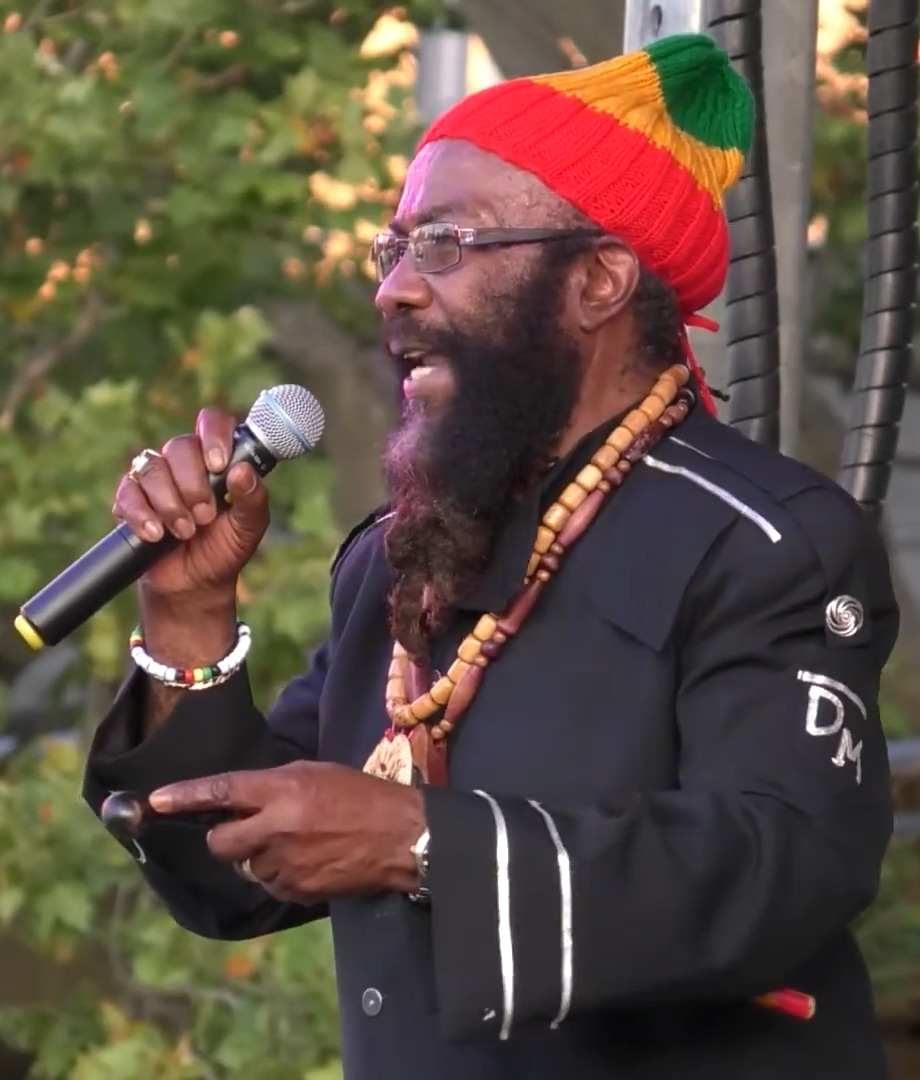
- Morgan in 2017
- Born: 15 May 1945; Jamaica
- Died: 3 March 2022 (aged 76–77); Lawrenceville, Georgia
- Occupation: Singer

Denroy Morgan (15 May 1945 – 3 March 2022) was a Jamaican-born American reggae artist. Morgan traveled to the United States in 1965, at the age of 20, to become a musician. He was part of the formation of the Black Eagles, a New York City reggae band in the 1970s, before launching a prosperous solo career in the 1980s onwards. His children, encouraged by his success, have also taken on musical careers themselves including Laza Morgan, Gramps Morgan, and in family bands LMS and Morgan Heritage.

== In the Black Eagles ==
Morgan had started in the 1970s and created the Black Eagles, a reggae band in New York City in 1974 with Devon "Igo Levi" Foster and Llewellyn "Jah T" Breadwood.

The Black Eagles won the New York Reggae Music Festival in 1977, beginning Denroy's rise to fame that continued into the early 1980s. In 1981, Morgan had his most successful release with "I'll Do Anything For You", which featured musical backing from the Black Eagles and peaked at number nine on the American soul chart. "I'll Do Anything For You" also peaked at number seven on the dance charts. These successes helped to launch his solo reggae career.

== Solo career ==
Morgan found success in the States in 1981 with the release of his I'll Do Anything for You album, when the title track became a big R&B and Dance hit. In the realm of reggae, however, Morgan's peak period was when he signed in 1984 with RCA Records. That deal led to the release of the reggae album Make My Day and marked him as the first reggae artist to be signed to RCA Records.

In March 2014 he announced that he was working on a new album, Half N Half, featuring cover versions of Bob Marley songs and excerpts from speeches by Haile Selassie, as well as working on an updated version of his memoirs, Confession Aloud.

== Personal life ==
Morgan died from cancer at his home in Lawrenceville, Georgia, on March 3, 2022. He is survived by his wife Hyacinth Morgan, his 30 children, 104 grandchildren, and 15 great grandchildren.

== Musical legacy ==
His children were all musical growing up and have since formed two separate bands and one is a successful solo act.

- The reggae band Morgan Heritage is made up of his children Peter "Peetah" Morgan, Una Morgan, Roy "Gramps" Morgan, Nakhamyah "Lukes" Morgan and Memmalatel "Mr. Mojo" Morgan.
- The dancehall / hip hop band LMS is made up of his children, the trio Noshayah Morgan, Otiyah "Laza" Morgan and Miriam Morgan
- Otiyah Morgan known as Laza Morgan is also a solo act with singles like "This Girl" and "One by One" the latter featuring Mavado. Other famous collaborations include being featured in Alexandra Burke's hit "Start Without You" and in Kristina Maria release "Co-Pilot"
- Roy Morgan known as Gramps Morgan, in addition to being of Morgan Heritage, is also a successful solo act with two albums Two Sides of My Heart and Reggae Music Lives and was featured in India.Arie hit song "Therapy".
- Roy "Gramps" Morgan's son Jemere Morgan has also launched a solo music career. His debut single "First Kiss" was released in August 2011.

== Discography ==
=== Studio Albums ===
==== List of studio albums ====
Title	Details
I'll Do Anything For You	Released: 1981; Label: Becket Records - Formats: CD, Cassette, Album
Make My Day	Released: 1984; Label: RCA Victor, RCA - Formats: CD, Album
Salvation	Released: 1988; Label: VP Records - Formats: CD, Album
Shock Dem	Released: 2001; Label: VP Records - Formats: CD, Album
Shahamanie City	Released: 2001; Label: 71 Records - Formats: CD, Album
Theocracy Reign	Released: 2009; Label: VP Records - Formats: CD, Album
Cool Runnings	Released: 2011; Label: Artists Only! Records - Formats: CD, Album
Link Up To Etheopia	Released: 2011; Label: VP Records, Asaph Records - Formats: CD, Album
Muzical Unity	Released: 2017; Label: Asaph Records - Formats: CD, Album

=== Singles & EPs ===
- "I'll Do Anything For You" (1981)
- "Denroy Morgan / Lionel Richie & Diana Ross - I'll Do Anything For You / Endless Love" (1981)
- "Sweet Tender Love" (1981)
- "Happy Feeling" (1982)
- "High On Your Love" (1983)
- "Universal Party/Into The Light" (1984)
- "Everbody Wants To Be Somebody Else" (1984)
- "Make My Day (Remixed Version)" (1984)
- "Make My Day" (Remixed Version) / Make My day / Jah Rastafari (1985)
- "Toots Hibbert & Denroy Morgan" - Walk With Love (1986)
- "Give It To Me" (1987)
- "Indeep / Denroy Morgan - Last Night A DJ Saved My Life / I'll Do Anything For You" (1989)
- "Third World / Denroy Morgan" - Now That We've Found Love (Remix) / I'll Do Anything For You (Remix) (1991)
- "Link Up" (1996)
- "Seven Chairs / Missing U" (1999)
- "Denroy Morgan / Morgan Heritage, Toots and the Maytals - Harvest Is Plenty / Lost Your Character" (1999)
- "Denroy Morgan / Sugar Minott - Revelation Come To Pass / Watch The System" (2000)
- "Gwen McCrae / Denroy Morgan - Funky Sensation (Remix) / I'll Do Anything For You (Remix)" (2001)
- "Cool Runnings / Stand Firm" (2001)
- "Denroy Morgan, Bigga Haitian, Kwame As 4-Real - Cool Runnings" (2001)
- "Morgan Heritage & Friends, Capleton, Jah Cure, Buju Banton, Denroy Morgan, LMS - New Jerusalem Medley" (2001)
- "Eve Of Destruction" (2005)
- "Denroy Morgan and the Asaph Ministry / Morgan Heritage and the Asaph Ministry - Rocka My Soul / Jesus Is Still Alive" (2006)
- "Denroy Morgan & The Asaph Ministry / Morgan Heritage & The Asaph Ministry - Theocracy Reign / Holy Sabbath" (2009)
- "Revelation Come To Pass / Read Your Bible" (2011)

=== Compilation Appearances ===
- Morgan Heritage Family Including L.M.S & Denroy Morgan - Know Your Past (Selections From The Royal Family Of Reggae 1997-2001), 2002 .... "I'll Do Anything For You"
