= The Silence (song) =

Single by Alexandra Burke

from the album Overcome
- Recorded: 2009–10
- Studio: Album version: Henson (Los Angeles); Single mix: Metropolis (London)
- Genre: Pop; R&B
- Length: 3:35
- Label: Syco
- Songwriters: Nadir Khayat; Bilal Hajji; Savan Kotecha
- Producer: RedOne

Alexandra Burke singles chronology
"Start Without You" (2010)	"The Silence" (2010)	"Elephant" (2012)

"The Silence" is a song by British singer Alexandra Burke from her debut studio album Overcome (2009). The song was written by Bilal Hajji and Savan Kotecha, along with the song's producer Nadir "RedOne" Khayat. The song was released as the sixth and final single off the album. Burke stated that the song was written when her aunt told the singer about how her partner and she were experiencing troubles in their relationship, and that they were not telling each other how they felt. In response, Burke asked her aunt why she was letting the silence in their relationship do the talking instead of them discussing it. "The Silence" is an R&B and pop-influenced power ballad and instrumentation consists of a piano, a guitar, and drums. The lyrics of the song feature the protagonist asking why the other person in the relationship remains silent about their difficulties instead of talking about them.

The song garnered positive reviews from music critics, who praised Burke's vocal performance. It also received comparisons to songs by Bonnie Tyler, Beyoncé Knowles, and Leona Lewis. Upon the release of Overcome, the song debuted at number 95 on the UK Singles Chart on the strength of digital download sales. A year later when released as a single, it peaked at number 16 on the chart. It peaked inside the top 30 on the singles charts in Hungary, Ireland, and Scotland, and peaked at number 66 in Switzerland. An accompanying music video directed by Nzingha Stewart was shot in black and white. It features Burke in a variety of different stylized sets in different outfits and dresses. The singer has performed the song on The Paul O'Grady Show and The X Factor. It was included on the set list of her All Night Long Tour (2011).

== Background and release ==
After the release and success of the lead single "Bad Boys" from her debut album Overcome in October 2009, the singer released "Broken Heels" as the second single in January 2010, with the intention of releasing "The Silence" as the album's third single. However, a remix single version of "All Night Long" featuring Pitbull was released as the third single from the album instead in May 2010. On 25 October 2010, Burke announced via Twitter that "The Silence" would be the final song to be released from Overcome, writing "Some of you might be surprised at my choice of next single and some of you guys will hopefully be really happy." The song was re-recorded with a new vocal for inclusion on the re-release of the album, entitled "The Silence (New Single Mix)". In an interview with Eamonn Holmes for Sky News Sunrise in December 2010, Burke stated that "The Silence" was released as a promotional single for the re-release of Overcome and for Christmas. During an interview talking about the song for Virgin Media in December 2010, Burke stated that "The Silence" is a "very special song" and that despite it being a "very emotional song to sing", it is one of her most favourite songs on Overcome.

== Composition and lyrics ==
"The Silence" is a power ballad, which lasts for a duration of three minutes and 35 seconds. It draws influence from the music genre of R&B and pop, while instrumentation consists of a piano, a guitar and drums. The song is written in the key of A minor and is set in simple time with a metronome of 76 beats per minute. Burke's vocal range in the song spans from the low note of F_{3} to the high note of F_{5}. In an interview with Peter Andre on The Paul O'Grady Show on 3 November 2009, Burke explained the meaning of the song's lyrics, saying "I'm sure everyone has been in that situation where you are in a relationship, it might not be going so well and you kinda want your other half to speak out and say what is on their mind, and I've had relationships like that." Burke continued to explain that when she was in the recording studio with RedOne, her Aunt was experiencing problems in her relationship which related to the lyrics in "The Silence," and that she felt that her Aunt's partner should not "let the silence do the talking? Why doesn't he let you know how he feels?," and that "The Silence" was written as a result. The song begins with the lyrics, "Oh, you lift me up."

== Response ==
=== Critical reception ===
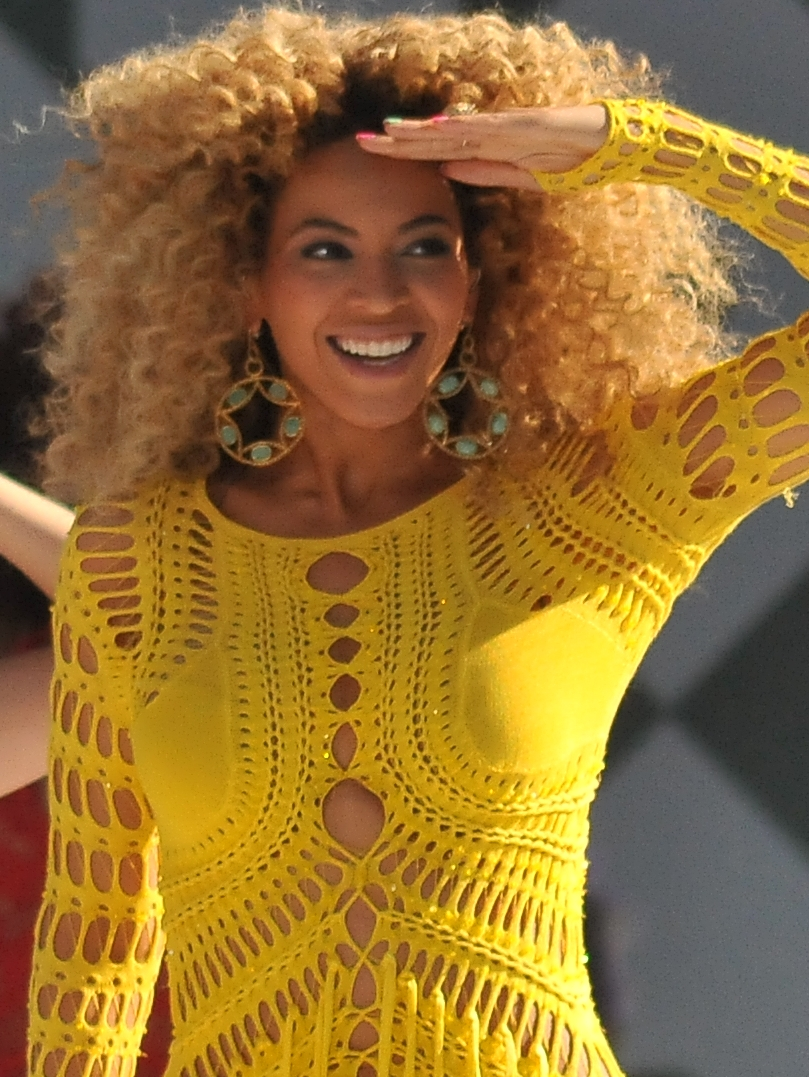
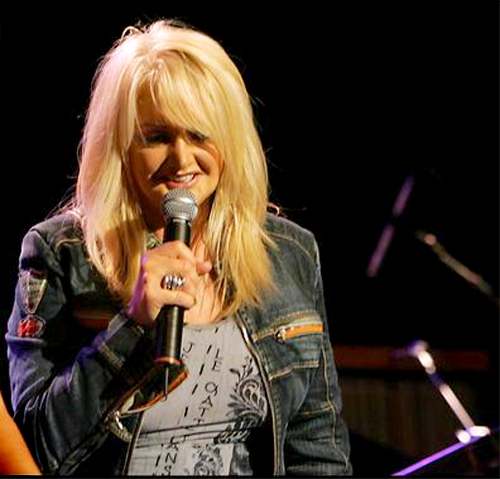
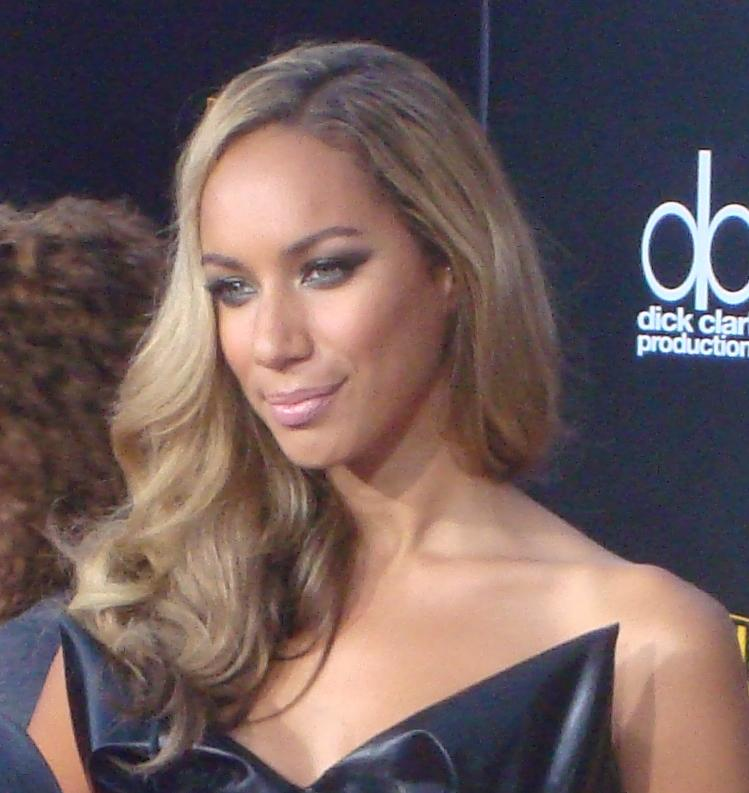
"The Silence" received comparisons to the music of Beyoncé (left), Bonnie Tyler (centre) and Leona Lewis (right).

"The Silence" garnered positive reviews from music critics. Al Fox for BBC Music described the song as "a gargantuan power ballad" and that it displays Burke's "rich and emotive vocals." Fox also compared the song to the work of Bonnie Tyler and Beyoncé. Nick Levine for Digital Spy wrote that Overcome features ballads which are reminiscent to songs performed by previous X Factor winner Leona Lewis, with regard to "The Silence" and the title track "Overcome."

=== Chart performance ===
Upon the release of Overcome, "The Silence" debuted on the UK Singles Chart at number 95 in the chart issue dated 31 October 2009. Upon its release as a promotional single in December 2010, it re-entered the singles chart at number 126 on 11 December 2010, and leaped to its peak of number 16 the following week. In the chart issue dated 25 December 2010, the song fell twenty positions to number 36. "The Silence" leaped from number 125 to number 13 on the UK Digital Chart. The following week, it dropped to number 35. In Scotland, the song peaked at number 16 on the Scottish Singles Chart on 18 December 2010. The following week, it descended to number 37. "The Silence" debuted and peaked at number 30 on the Irish Singles Chart on 9 December 2010. The following week, it dropped to number 35. The song debuted and peaked on the Swiss Singles Chart at number 66 on 12 December 2010, and fell to number 69 the following week. A month later, the song re-entered the chart at number 72 on 23 January 2011 for one week. In Hungary, the song peaked at number 26.

== Music video ==
The music video for "The Silence" was directed by Nzingha Stewart before the video for "All Night Long" was shot. The video was shot in black and white, and features Burke in different outfits and dresses, as well as in a variety of sets with props. It begins with a couple of establishing shots of Burke of her posing with a balloon wearing and in another set where she is sitting on music speakers. Throughout the video, Burke is visibly in a studio with different backdrops, where she is preparing to be photographed. During the first verse, Burke is shown in the two sets while she sings the lyrics. Prior to the first chorus, a new set is introduced of Burke wearing a black dress which exposes all of her back while sitting on the floor next to a stereo. During the first verse, all three sets show Burke carrying out different tasks with he props, as well as a new set where she sits in front of a white backdrop in a plain white oversized shirt. As the second verse begins, the set of Burke sitting on the floor next to a stereo changes to that of her standing up in front of a microphone singing the lyrics, with the backdrop of a city skyline. During the second verse, another set is introduced of Burke posing against a stuffed animal. During the bridge, Burke sings the lyrics standing in front of the camera without any props surrounding her; prior to sustaining a long note, Burke has her back to the camera and is nude from the waist up. During the final verse, Burke's anger and desperation is shown to be heightened, as she sings to her herself in the mirror and places more emphasis on her movement. The video ends with the singer nude from the waist up and facing the camera, covering herself with her arms crossed over her chest.

== Live performances ==
Burke performed the song for the first time on MTV Push upon the release of Overcome. Burke then performed the song on 3 November 2009 on The Paul O'Grady show, where she gave an interview about her experience on The X Factor and how the lyrics for "The Silence" were conceptualised. Upon the announcement that the song and music video were going to be released, Burke included the song on her set list of the Jingle Bell Ball concerts around the country, where other artists including Nicole Scherzinger, Olly Murs and The Wanted also performed. During the performance at The O2 Arena in London, Burke was moved to tears and apologised to the audience, saying "I'm sorry for getting emotional, but that song means way too much to me." Burke performed the song on the semi-final of the seventh series of The X Factor on 5 December 2010. The song was also included on the set list of Burke's All Night Long Tour (2011).

== Track listings ==
- 2009 standard edition
4. "The Silence" – 4:01
- 2010 deluxe edition
2. "The Silence" (New Single Mix) – 3:35

Digital EP

1. "The Silence" (Almighty Radio Edit) - 3:44
2. "The Silence" (Almighty 12" Mix) - 6:50
3. "The Silence" (Almighty 12" Dub) - 6:57
4. "The Silence" (Almighty 12" Instrumental) - 6:48

== Credits and personnel ==
=== "The Silence" ===
Recording

- Recorded at Henson Studios, Los Angeles, CA.

Personnel

- Songwriting – RedOne, Bilal 'The Chef' Hajji, Savan Kotecha
- Production – RedOne
- Recording and engineering – RedOne, Martin Cooke
- Vocal arrangement – RedOne
- Vocal editing – RedOne, Johnny Severin
- Engineering – RedOne
- Mixing – Robert Orton
- String arrangement and recording – Eric Arvinder
- Programming – RedOne
- All instrumentation – RedOne
- Background vocals – Alexandra Burke, RedOne

=== "The Silence" (New Single Mix) ===
Recording

- Recorded at Metropolis Studios, London, England.

Personnel

- Songwriting – RedOne, Bilal 'The Chef' Hajji, Savan Kotecha
- Production – RedOne
- Mixing – Phil Tan
- Recording – Quiz and Larossi

"The Silence" (2009) credits adapted from the liner notes of Overcome, and "The Silence" (New Single Mix) (2010) credits adapted from the deluxe edition of Overcome.

== Charts ==
Chart (2009–11)	Peak position
ERROR in "CIS": Invalid position: 269. Expected number 1–200 or dash (–).
Hungary (Rádiós Top 40)	26
Ireland (IRMA)	30
Scotland Singles (OCC)	16
Switzerland (Schweizer Hitparade)	66
UK Singles (OCC)	16
