= New Rules (disambiguation) =

"New Rules" is a 2017 song by Dua Lipa.

New Rules may also refer to:

- New Rules (book), a 2005 book by Bill Maher
- #NewRules (Alexandra Burke EP), 2012
- New Rules (Weki Meki EP), 2020
- New Rules (band), an English-Irish pop boy band
- "New Rules", a segment on Real Time with Bill Maher
- New Rules, a five issue arc of Buffy the Vampire Slayer Season Ten
- "New Rules", a song by Tomorrow X Together from The Dream Chapter: Magic
