= Kristina Maria =

Canadian pop singer-songwriter (born 1989)

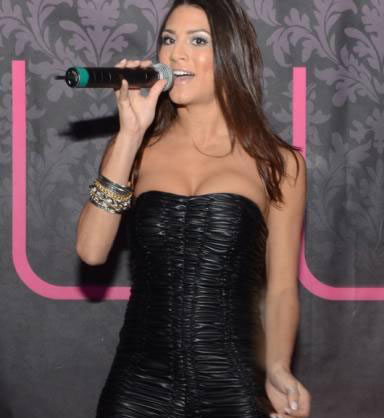
- Maria, Luxy Nightclub's showcase, Concord, Ontario, Canada.

Background information
- Also known as: Kristina Maria
- Born: Kristina Maria Chalhoub; 14 May 1989 (age 37); Ottawa, Ontario, Canada
- Genres: Pop; R&B; dance
- Occupations: Singer; Songwriter
- Years active: 2011–present
- Label: Independent Record
- Website: www.kristinamariamusic.com

Kristina Maria Chalhoub (born 14 May 1989 in Ottawa, Ontario) is a Canadian pop singer-songwriter.

== Early life ==
Kristina Maria Chalhoub was raised in Ottawa, Ontario. She joined her school's choir as a second-grader, and wrote her first song in third grade. By the age of 12, she participated in talent shows in Ottawa and spent time in local studios recording demos. She also enrolled in dance classes and took formal lessons at the Canadian Conservatory of Music in Ottawa singing in many styles, from pop to opera to R&B. She graduated from Garneau High School.

In 2005, her vocal coach sent Chalhoub and a group named The Showstoppers with seven other girls to perform medleys of ABBA and Motown hits at theme parks including Disney World, Universal Studios, and SeaWorld.

== Career ==
In the summer of 2009, veteran music industry executive Vito Luprano (Céline Dion, Garou) heard some of Chalhoub's recordings and the pair signed an exclusive artist development deal under Luprano's music label Lupo One.

She released her first single, "Let's Play", which peaked at number 19 on the Canadian Hot 100, on 11 June 2011 followed by "Co-Pilot" reaching number 26 on the Canadian Hot 100, prompting her to record a bilingual English/French version with Corneille and a hit in French Singles Chart peaking at number 33. Her third single, "Our Song Comes On" reached number 23 on the Canadian Hot 100 in 2012. Maria went on tour in Canada in 2011, promoting the upcoming release of her debut album, Tell the World. Also on the tour were Hedley, MAGIC!, Ellie Goulding, Tegan and Sara, Karl Wolf, Mia Martina, JRDN, and her dancers; two members of Blueprint Cru from America's Best Dance Crew. Chalhoub promoted artist merchandise on tour and online partnered by Ottawa Shirt Printing. The album was released in April 2012 on Luprano's label, Lupo One. In 2012, Chalhoub performed alongside featured artist Corneille in Agadir, Morocco at The Concert for Tolerance in an effort to promote open mindedness. In 2013, Tell the World was nominated for a Juno Award for Pop Album of the Year alongside nominees Justin Bieber, Carly Rae Jepsen, Nelly Furtado, and Victoria Duffield. In 2014, Chalhoub released "Move Like a Soldier" peaking at number 22 on the Canadian Hot 100. Off the stage, Chalhoub continued to develop her songwriting career co-writing with Kristian Lundin, Savan Kotecha, Mark Fiest, JC Chasez, Billy Steinberg, and BC Jean.

In 2017, the release of Chalhoub's single "Gone in a Minute" was canceled as Chalhoub terminated her management and publishing contract with Lupo One to pursue her music career as an artist and songwriter independently.

== Discography ==
=== Albums ===
Title	Album details	Peak chart positions	Notes
Title	Album details	CAN	Notes
Tell the World	Released: 10 April 2012; Label: LupoOne; Format: CD, digital download	—	

=== Singles ===
Year	Title	Peak chart positions			Certifications	Album
Year	Title	CAN	BEL (Wa)	FRA	Certifications	Album
2011	"FML X2"	—	—	—		Tell The World
2011	"Let's Play"	19	—	—	CAN: Gold	Tell The World
2011	"Co-Pilot" (featuring Laza Morgan)	26	—	—	CAN: Gold	Tell The World
2012	"Our Song Comes On"	23	—	—	CAN: Gold	Tell The World
2012	"Co-Pilot" (featuring Corneille)	80	51	27		Tell The World
2012	"Animal" (featuring JC Chasez)	97	—	—		Tell The World
2012	"Karma"	34	—	—		Tell The World
2013	"You Don't Have the Right to Cry"	—	—	—		—N/a
2013	"Bang U Up"	—	—	—		—N/a
2014	"Move Like a Soldier"	22	—	—		—N/a
2014	"Where the Sun Don't Shine"	—	—	—		—N/a
2017	"Gone in a Minute"	—	—	—		—N/a
"—" denotes a title that did not chart, or was not released in that territory.
