= The Phantom Boyz =

- Also known as: Phantom Boyz Music
- Origin: Plainfield, New Jersey, U.S.
- Genres: Contemporary R&B
- Years active: 2006–present
- Labels: Phantom Boyz Music, LLC
- Members: Melvin Watson; Larry Summerville Jr.

Phantom Boyz Music LLC is an American music production entity founded by Melvin "Official" Watson. Since its inception in 2006, it has produced records for artists including Jim Jones, Christina Aguilera, B5, Alexandra Burke, BoA, Rainie Yang, Flo Rida, P. Diddy, and Sean Garrett, among others.

== History ==
After initially collaborating with several American recording artists, Watson went on to expand his sound internationally, working with several foreign pop artists, including Alexandra Burke ("Bad Boys"), BoA ("I Did It For Love") and Rainie Yang ("It's Our World"). Burke's single "Bad Boys" entered the UK Singles Chart at number one and spent 25 consecutive weeks in the top seventy-five. The track is certified platinum in the United Kingdom. BoA's "I Did It For Love" peaked at number 19 on Billboard's Hot Dance Club Play.

In 2010, The Phantom Boyz worked with the singer-songwriter Christina Aguilera and produced her song, "The Beautiful People", which is on the Burlesque film soundtrack and sold over a million units worldwide. The Phantom Boyz signed several recording acts to their roster, including the pop artist J Rice, between 2009 and 2011.

They have, more recently, collaborated with, Karina Pasian, Andre Merritt, r, Alexandra Burke, Lauren Evans, Bridget Kelly, Frankie Storm.

== Discography ==
- 2007: "Hydrolics" (B5 feat. Diddy and Bow Wow)
- 2007: "No Fuss" (Jim Jones feat. Stack Bundles, Rell and Mell Matrix)
- 2008: "I Did It For Love" (BoA feat. Sean Garrett)
- 2009: "Bad Boys" (Alexandra Burke feat. Flo Rida)
- 2010: "It's Our World" (Rainie Yang)
- 2010: "The Beautiful People" (Christina Aguilera)
- 2010: "Fireproof" (Jeremy Greene)
- 2010: "How Fly Is He" (Jeremy Greene feat. Diddy)
- 2010: "Ain't No Way" (Jeremy Greene)
- No Information Found: "Timber" (Tiffany Evans)
- 2017: "Pulling Me Back" (Bridget Kelly)
- 2011: "I Don't Need You" (Ayako Nakanomori)
