= Overcome (Alexandra Burke album) =

Studio album by Alexandra Burke
- Released: 16 October 2009
- Recorded: 2008–2009
- Genres: Pop; soul-pop; R&B
- Length: 48:43
- Labels: Syco; Epic
- Producers: Simon Cowell (exec.); The Phantom Boyz; Stargate; Alex James; RedOne; Ne-Yo; Louis Biancaniello; Samuel Watters; Jim Jonsin; Rico Love; Element; Wayne Wilkins; Steve Booker; Brian Kennedy

Alexandra Burke chronology
Overcome (2009)	Heartbreak on Hold (2012)

Alternative cover
- Deluxe edition cover

Singles from Overcome
- 1. "Hallelujah" Released: 17 December 2008; 2. "Bad Boys" Released: 9 October 2009; 3. "Broken Heels" Released: 18 January 2010; 4. "All Night Long" Released: 3 May 2010; 5. "Start Without You" Released: 31 August 2010; 6. "The Silence" Released: 6 December 2010

Overcome is the debut studio album by British singer Alexandra Burke, released 16 October 2009 on Syco Music. The release of the album came a year after Burke won the British talent show, The X Factor, with the recording process taking place between 2008 and 2009. Critics praised the album for showcasing Burke's vocal charm and characterisation, comparing her vocal to American singers Anastacia and Whitney Houston and its contemporary finish; using a variety of acclaimed producers including RedOne and Ne-Yo.

Upon its release, Overcome debuted at number one on the UK Albums Chart, selling 132,065 copies in its first week, the fourth largest first week sales for a female singer in 2009. The album became a commercial success in Europe being certified double platinum in the United Kingdom and Ireland. To date the album has sold over one million copies worldwide. All six singles released from Overcome peaked within the top twenty on the UK singles chart, three of which reached number one. As well as receiving positive reviews, Overcome earned a nomination for Best Album at the Urban Music Awards.

== Background ==
In December 2008, Burke won the fifth series of the British reality singing competition, The X Factor, having previously entered in 2005. The singer received 58% of the final public vote. Burke's prize was a £1 million recording contract with Syco Records, a subsidiary of Sony BMG, including a £150,000 advance payment. Burke's debut single, a cover of Leonard Cohen's "Hallelujah" was released as the show's "winner's single". Upon winning the show, Burke remarked: "Thank you so much for making my dream come true. I'm the happiest girl alive."

Burke's album was originally scheduled for a March 2009 release in time for Mother's Day. However, following the success of fellow X Factor contestant, Leona Lewis, the album was pushed back for an Autumn release. On 13 February 2009 it was reported that Burke had signed a £3.5 million, five-album United States record deal with Epic Records. After visiting Burke in the studio, Beyoncé spoke of possibly recording a duet with her.

== Recording and production ==
"The album is very 'me'. It's very much my personality. It's deep. When I went into the studio every day, I would bring my diary – I have kept one since I was nine [...] Anything I'd done six months ago or maybe what I'd been through the day before, I would read out and we'd write from there. So the songs are very deep and true to me and what I believe in. I only ever sing songs I believe in. It's a mix between up-tempo stuff and ballads. Because I'm quite 'in your face' and loud, the upbeat songs are like that. When I sang the ballads, I cried recording them. The songs are very emotional for me and I'm hoping people can relate to them."

— Alexandra Burke

Producers Pharrell Williams and Akon were reportedly asked to produce for the album according to MTV. Burke's website confirmed that RedOne had produced a selection of songs for Burke to work on, including a song titled "Broken Heels", which was the first song recorded for Overcome. Whilst in the states she also worked with Louis Biancaniello, Sam Watters, Jim Jonsin, Rico Love, Roc Nation and Stargate. New production team "Element" announced on their website that they had produced two songs for Burke, including one track which made the final cut for Overcome, titled "Bury Me (6 Feet Under)". Another song, "Dangerous", was released as the B-side for "Bad Boys".

Aside from working with American producers, Burke also collaborated with British singer-songwriter Taio Cruz and Steve Booker. Booker produced the track "You Broke My Heart", which he co-wrote with Niara Scarlett and Pixie Lott, one of several the British singer submitted for the album. According to Booker the song was originally had a different title and it was Simon Cowell that requested the name change. Burke also recorded tracks with British dance duo The Freemasons.

Writing on her official website, Burke has said of the album:

"I said to my manager I want my music to be fun, to be uplifting and to be bold. I want it to reflect my personality. I want it to be in your face, I want it to be a beast. I want it to be energetic and fun. When I record the ballads I want to cry. And if I go through a roller coaster recording this album then I want the listener to go through a roller coaster when they hear it."

Burke has revealed that she is making changes to the album for a US release. Burke has said will still use the same music videos in the United States. The singer quoted that "I'd love for America to go well next year. I'm working on an American version of Overcome," she told the Daily Star. "I'm writing a few things for it. Ideally I just want to lay down some ideas, present it to the label and then see what happens. I don't think we're going to change it that much for the American market as the videos will definitely stay the same. That's the reason I wanted them ("Bad Boys" and "Broken Heels") shot in LA. It's cheaper and wiser to make one video and make it work for both markets."

RedOne will also be producing songs for the re-release:

When we [RedOne and Alexandra] were in the studio together the other day, he was like, 'OK, do your ad libs for the beginning of the track', so I went, 'OK! I'm going to say your name and then I'm going to say mine. I've done that already and I'm going to do it again'. I don't do it on all our tracks though – 'Dumb' doesn't have it and 'The Silence' doesn't have it – but I think that when it's a fun song, the shout-out suits it. This song we were working on the other day is fun and lively, so it just felt right.""Well, we did manage to finish it the other day and it's an uptempo song.

== Theft of production demos ==
On 11 and 12 July 2009 two previously unheard songs surfaced on the internet believed to be produced by The Stereotypes and The Runaways. The songs were titled "Overcome" and "Perfect". Cowell confirmed that the songs were early demo tracks stolen by hackers. A criminal investigation was launched into the incident in support with the International Federation of the Phonographic Industry. At the end of March 2010 it was reported that Burke's Syco Music had suffered once again from computer hackers who managed to obtain 14 of Burke's previously unheard studio recordings as well as 26 from fellow label-mate Leona Lewis. Following the second incident of leaks Cowell has contacted the FBI to track down those responsible. Included in the leaks was newly recorded version of "All Night Long" featuring American rapper, Pitbull which was tipped to be the singer's third single in March 2010. According to Burke, the songs were leaked by "Two little boys in Germany on work experience", working for Syco.

== Promotion ==
Burke helped to launch UK music channel Viva, performing "Bad Boys", "They Don't Know" and "Hallelujah" live for the broadcast. Burke also played a small set including "Bad Boys" and "Hallelujah" at the BBC Switch Live alongside American group The Black Eyed Peas. Burke started her European Promo Tour in Brussels on 18 January, also visiting Amsterdam, Copenhagen, Stockholm, Berlin, Vienna, Zurich, Milan and Paris, where she promoted "Bad Boys" and her debut album, by visiting many radio stations and performing the single making several TV appearances.

=== Singles ===
"Hallelujah", a cover of Leonard Cohen's song, was Burke's debut release as The X Factor winner's single. The song, which reached the UK Singles Chart Christmas number-one, broke numerous records including the "fastest-selling download ever across Europe" after selling 105,000 digital copies after just two days of release, and 576,000 copies in its first sales week. The song remained at number-one for three weeks, and was certified Platinum by the British Phonographic Industry. "Hallelujah" went on to sell over one million copies in the United Kingdom alone, and was 2008's biggest selling single in the United Kingdom, despite having only been on sale for two weeks. The song is notable for fuelling a campaign for singer Jeff Buckley's version of the song to become number-one instead of Burke's version. Buckley's rendition eventually reached the United Kingdom's Christmas number-two, making it the first time the same song had occupied both the first and second spots on the singles chart. Burke's version of the song is the seventh best-selling download of all time in the United Kingdom.

"Bad Boys" is the lead single from Overcome, and the second single overall. Described as "21st century techno future-pop" by Burke's website, it features American rapper Flo Rida. In one of the song's earliest reviews, music website Popjustice called the song "literally amazing." Bill Lamb of About.com has said of the single: "big international success seems a real possibility." "Bad Boys" debuted at number-one on the UK and the Irish Singles chart, becoming Burke's second consecutive chart-topper in both countries, selling over 187,000 copies to become the fastest selling single of 2009 in the United Kingdom, and was replaced the following week by her X Factor mentor Cheryl Cole's "Fight for This Love".

"Broken Heels" is the second single from Overcome, and third single overall. It was released on 18 January 2010 and peaked at #8 on UK Singles Chart thus making it Burke's third top ten single in the United Kingdom. The single peaked #5 on the Irish Singles Chart.

"All Night Long" is the third single from Overcome. It was confirmed by Burke as her fourth single via her Twitter page. The song's video was filmed on Saturday 27 March 2010 in London and has been remixed to include American rapper Pitbull. The song reached #4 on UK Singles Chart. The single has reached #1 on the Irish Singles Chart, making it Burke's third number-one single in Ireland. It also reached number 24 on the Dutch Top 40.

"Start Without You" was the fourth single from Overcome, included on the repackaged edition of the album. It was released on 5 September 2010 and is debuted at #1 on the UK Singles Chart, selling 73,000 copies in its first week. The song became her 3rd number-one single in the United Kingdom. The single debuted at #5 on the Irish Singles Chart, becoming her fifth consecutive top-five hit in Ireland.

"The Silence" was the fifth and final single from Overcome. Burke performed the single on The X Factor a day before the single's release. The single was released digitally on 5 December 2010, the day the deluxe version of Overcome was released. The music video premiered via Burke's official YouTube account on 21 October 2010.

=== Tour ===
Burke embarked on the All Night Long Tour on 14 January 2011, in support of Overcome.

== Critical reception ==
Professional ratings
Review scores
Source	Rating
AllMusic	3.5/5 stars
Digital Spy	4/5 stars
Evening Standard	3/5 stars
Financial Times	4/5 stars
The Guardian	3/5 stars
RTÉ	3/5 stars
The Times	4/5 stars
Virgin Media	2/5 stars
Yahoo! Music UK	7/10 stars

The album received mixed-to-positive reviews, with critics lauding its energy, powerful vocals, and mainstream appeal, while noting its inconsistency, generic moments, and lack of a distinct artistic identity. AllMusic editor Matthew Chisling described Overcome as a "bold and brazen soul-pop album" with "vocal charm and characterization." Although sometimes "too generic and polished," he praised its "brilliant, perfect mainstream pop" moments and argued it showcases a "real vocalist" with standout charisma. Al Fox of the BBC said that the album was "relevant, it's contemporary, it's edgy enough for younger fans but accessible enough for a wider audience," calling it "swathed in personality." Yahoo! Music UK's Tom Howard wrote that the album was "rammed with dancefloor destroyers" and "incalculably more exciting" than Leona Lewis’s work, with highs that "shine [...] bright enough to burn retinas." However, he criticized its weaker moments, arguing that when it slows down it "fails," with ballads feeling "pointless" and missteps like "Hallelujah" a "travesty." Giving the album four out of five stars, Alex Hardy of The Times stated "last year's X Factor winner belts out a few impeccably voiced big ballads, but they’re merely fillers among sci-fi disco tracks and bassy, beaty collaborations that often more closely resemble Christina Aguilera or Lady Gaga."

Alexis Petridis of The Guardian said that "Broken Heels" is a "spectacularly polished product." His review also praised the album's ballads saying "[t]he ballads are seldom the highlight of any pop-soul album, but at least here they come equipped with booming post-Umbrella beats to distract you from the river of lyrical drivel – you lift me up, been hurt so many times before, some things are worth fighting for, and so on." Petridis gave the album three out of five stars, noting that "Bury Me" and "You Broke My Heart" were "Motown pastiches that seem a little too craven and obvious in their pursuit of the Duffy market." Hugh Montgomery from The Observer, drew comparisons with Barbadian singer Rihanna, whilst calling the album "cast-iron edifice of a debut" and saying it has a "crack team of producers." David Smyth from The Evening Standard described Overcome as a "high-quality production" aimed at a US audiences, where the style often "suits her." However, he argued her voice "lacks individuality" and the album "isn't sure where it's going," casting doubt on her as a "British Beyoncé." In a negative review, The Independent portrayed Overcome as a "jazzed up" attempt to distinguish her from Leona Lewis, filled with "pale imitation[s]" and "Primark R&B." The newspaper argued that the album was "absolutely phoning in" and ultimately "not in a remotely interesting way."

== Commercial performance ==
Overcome debuted at number one on the UK Albums Chart, selling 132,065 in its first week according to the British Phonographic Industry. Its first-week numbers were the third largest first-week sales by a female artist in 2009 behind releases by Susan Boyle and Leona Lewis and was the twenty-second best-selling album of 2009, and the forty-third best-selling album of 2010. The album spent 60 weeks on the UK Albums Chart and has been certified double platinum by The British Recorded Music Industry for shipments over 600,000 copies. As of November 2015, the album had sold 821,189 copies in the United Kingdom.

In Ireland, where the album made its first chart appearance, It debuted at number two behind Michael Bublé's fourth album Crazy Love, eventually being certified double-platinum for sales over 30,000. Elsewhere in Europe, Overcome received a moderate reception, debuting inside the top 40 in Greece and Australia and the top 100 in Switzerland, Germany and Poland. To date, the album has sold over one copies worldwide.

== Track listing ==
Overcome track listing
No.	Title	Writer(s)	Producer(s)	Length
1.	"Bad Boys" (featuring Flo Rida)	Melvin K. Watson Jr.; Larry Summerville Jr.; Busbee; Lauren Evans; Alexander James; Tramar Dillard	The Phantom Boyz	3:26
2.	"Good Night Good Morning" (featuring Ne-Yo)	Shaffer Smith; Mikkel S. Eriksen; Tor Erik Hermansen	StarGate; Ne-Yo^{[A]}	3:37
3.	"The Silence"	Nadir Khayat; Bilal Hajji; Savan Kotecha	RedOne	4:01
4.	"All Night Long"	Richard Butler Jr.; James Scheffer; Sam Watters; Louis Biancaniello	Biancaniello; Watters; Jim Jonsin; Rico Love	4:23
5.	"Bury Me (6 Feet Under)"	Hitesh Ceon; Kim Ofstad; Andrea Martin; Hermansen	Element	3:33
6.	"Broken Heels"	Khayat; Hajji; Kotecha	RedOne	4:09
7.	"Dumb"	Khayat; Hajji; Kotecha; Martin Kierszenbaum	RedOne	3:22
8.	"Overcome"	Bulter Jr.; Biancaniello; Watters; Wayne Wilkins	Wayne Wilkins; Biancaniello; Watters	3:53
9.	"Gotta Go"	Aeon Manahan; Herbie Crichlow; Kotecha; Wilkins	Wilkins; Step^{[A]}	4:00
10.	"You Broke My Heart"	Steve Booker; Niara Scarlett; Victoria Lott	Booker	3:37
11.	"Nothing But the Girl"	Smith; Eriksen; Hermansen; Will Kennard; Saul Milton	StarGate; Ne-Yo^{[A]}; Chase & Status^{[A]}	3:37
12.	"They Don't Know"	Brian Kennedy Seals; James Fauntleroy II	Brian Kennedy	3.13
13.	"Hallelujah" (bonus track)	Leonard Cohen	Quiz & Larossi	3:37
Total length:				48:28

iTunes Store edition bonus track
No.	Title	Writer(s)	Producer(s)	Length
14.	"It's Over"	Smith; Eriksen; Hermansen	StarGate; Ne-Yo^{[A]}	3:53
Total length:				52:21

International digital edition bonus track
No.	Title	Writer(s)	Producer(s)	Length
15.	"All Night Long" (featuring Pitbull)	Butler; Scheffer; Watters; Biancaniello	Biancaniello; Watters; Jonsin; Love	3:48
Total length:				55:30

Japanese edition bonus tracks
No.	Title	Writer(s)	Producer(s)	Length
14.	"All Night Long" (featuring Pitbull)	Butler; Scheffer; Watters; Biancaniello	Biancaniello; Watters; Jonsin; Love	3:48
15.	"Dangerous"	Ceon; Ofstad; Martin	Element	3:14
Total length:				55:30

British limited edition bonus disc
No.	Title	Writer(s)	Original artist	Length
1.	"Listen" (live on The X Factor)	Henry Krieger; Scott Cutler; Anne Preven; Beyoncé Knowles	Beyoncé	2:23
2.	"Toxic" (live on The X Factor)	Christian Karlsson; Pontus Winnberg; Cathy Dennis; Henrik Jonback	Britney Spears	1:57
3.	"You Are So Beautiful" (live on The X Factor)	Billy Preston; Bruce Fisher	Joe Cocker	2:01
4.	"Relight My Fire" (live on The X Factor)	Dan Hartman	Hartman	2:34
5.	"Un-Break My Heart" (live on The X Factor)	Diane Warren	Toni Braxton	2:06
Total length:				11:01

=== Deluxe edition ===
Disc 1 (CD)
No.	Title	Writer(s)	Producer(s)	Length
1.	"Start Without You" (featuring Laza Morgan)	Khayat; Kotecha; Julian Bunetta; Kristian Lundin	RedOne	3:33
2.	"The Silence" (New Single Mix)	Khayat; Hajji; Kotecha	RedOne	3:36
3.	"Bad Boys" (featuring Flo Rida)	Watson Jr.; Summerville Jr.; Busbee; Evans; James; Dillard	The Phantom Boyz	3:26
4.	"All Night Long" (featuring Pitbull)	Butler Jr.; Scheffer; Watters; Biancaniello	Biancaniello; Watters; Jonsin; Love	3:48
5.	"Perfect"	Fauntleroy II; Peter Hernandez; Philip Lawrence; Ari Levine	The Smeezingtons	3:17
6.	"What Happens on the Dancefloor" (featuring Cobra Starship)	AJ Junior; Gabe Saporta; Khayat; Hajji; Kotecha	RedOne	3:07
7.	"Before the Rain"	Steve Mac; Ina Wroldsen	Mac	3:33
8.	"Broken Heels" (Single Mix)	Khayat; Hajji; Kotecha	RedOne	3:35
9.	"Good Night Good Morning" (featuring Ne-Yo)	Smith; Eriksen; Hermansen	StarGate; Ne-Yo^{[A]}	3:37
10.	"Bury Me (6 Feet Under)"	Ceon; Ofstad; Martin; Hermansen	Element	3:33
11.	"Dumb"	Khayat; Hajji; Kotecha; Kierszenbaum	RedOne	3:22
12.	"Overcome"	Watters; Biancaniello; Merritt	Biancaniello; Watters	3:53
13.	"Gotta Go"	Manahan; Crichlow; Kotecha; Wilkins	Wilkins; Step	4:00
14.	"You Broke My Heart"	Booker; Scarlett; Lott	Booker	3:37
15.	"Nothing But the Girl"	Smith; Eriksen; Hermansen; Kennard; Milton	StarGate; Ne-Yo^{[A]}; Chase & Status^{[A]}	3:41
16.	"They Don't Know"	Seals; Fauntleroy II	Kennedy	3:13
17.	"Hallelujah"	Cohen	Quiz & Larossi	3:37
Total length:				60:28

Disc 2 (DVD)
No.	Title	Details	Length
1.	"Hallelujah"	Music video	3:33
2.	"Bad Boys" (featuring Flo Rida)	Music video	3:59
3.	"Broken Heels"	Music video	3:38
4.	"All Night Long" (featuring Pitbull)	Music video	3:54
5.	"Start Without You" (featuring Laza Morgan)	Music video	3:32
6.	"The Silence"	Music video	3:36
Total length:			22:12

2022 digital expanded edition bonus tracks
No.	Title	Writer(s)	Producer(s)	Length
18.	"Dangerous"	Ceon; Ofstad; Martin	Element	3:14
19.	"It's Over"	Smith; Eriksen; Hermansen	StarGate; Ne-Yo	3:53
20.	"The Silence"	Khayat; Hajji; Kotecha	RedOne	4:02
21.	"All Night Long"	Butler Jr.; Scheffer; Watters; Biancaniello	Biancaniello; Watters; Jonsin; Love	4:24
22.	"Broken Heels"	Khayat; Hajji; Kotecha	RedOne	4:08

==== 2022 LP edition ====
Side one
No.	Title	Writer(s)	Producer(s)	Length
1.	"Bad Boys" (featuring Flo Rida)	Watson Jr.; Summerville Jr.; Busbee; Evans; James; Dillard	The Phantom Boyz	3:26
2.	"All Night Long" (featuring Pitbull)	Butler Jr.; Scheffer; Watters; Biancaniello	Biancaniello; Watters; Jonsin; Love	3:48
3.	"Good Night Good Morning" (featuring Ne-Yo)	Smith; Eriksen; Hermansen	StarGate; Ne-Yo^{[A]}	3:37
4.	"The Silence" (New Single Mix)	Khayat; Hajji; Kotecha	RedOne	3:36

Side two
No.	Title	Writer(s)	Producer(s)	Length
1.	"Broken Heels" (Single Mix)	Khayat; Hajji; Kotecha	RedOne	3:35
2.	"Nothing But the Girl"	Smith; Eriksen; Hermansen; Kennard; Milton	StarGate; Ne-Yo^{[A]}; Chase & Status^{[A]}	3:41
3.	"Dumb"	Khayat; Hajji; Kotecha; Kierszenbaum	RedOne	3:22
4.	"Overcome"	Watters; Biancaniello; Merritt	Biancaniello; Watters	3:53
5.	"Perfect"	Fauntleroy II; Peter Hernandez; Philip Lawrence; Ari Levine	The Smeezingtons	3:17

Side three
No.	Title	Writer(s)	Producer(s)	Length
1.	"Start Without You" (featuring Laza Morgan)	Khayat; Kotecha; Bunetta; Kristian Lundin	RedOne	3:33
2.	"You Broke My Heart"	Booker; Scarlett; Lott	Booker	3:37
3.	"Bury Me (6 Feet Under)"	Ceon; Ofstad; Martin; Hermansen	Element	3:33
4.	"It's Over"	Smith; Eriksen; Hermansen	StarGate; Ne-Yo^{[A]}	3:53
5.	"Gotta Go"	Manahan; Crichlow; Kotecha; Wilkins	Wilkins; Step	4:00

Side four
No.	Title	Writer(s)	Producer(s)	Length
1.	"Dangerous"	Ceon; Ofstad; Martin	Element	3:14
2.	"They Don't Know"	Seals; Fauntleroy II	Kennedy	3:13
3.	"Before the Rain"	Steve Mac; Ina Wroldsen	Mac	3:33
4.	"Hallelujah"	Cohen	Quiz & Larossi	3:37

Notes

- ^{^[A]} denotes co-producer
- "What Happens on the Dancefloor" does not appear on the LP edition of the album.

== Chart positions ==
=== Weekly charts ===
Chart (2009–10)	Peak position
Australian Urban Albums (ARIA)	25
Austrian Albums (Ö3 Austria)	54
Belgian Albums (Ultratop Flanders)	73
European Top 100 Albums (Billboard)	7
Dutch Albums (Album Top 100)	61
German Albums (Offizielle Top 100)	60
Greek Albums (IFPI)	20
Irish Albums (IRMA)	2
Japanese Albums (Oricon)	46
Polish Albums (ZPAV)	79
Scottish Albums (Official Charts)	1
South Korean International Albums (Gaon)	36
South Korean International Albums (Gaon) Deluxe edition	48
Swiss Albums (Schweizer Hitparade)	54
UK Albums (Official Charts)	1
UK Album Downloads (Official Charts)	1

=== Year-end charts ===
Chart (2009)	Position
UK Albums (OCC)	22
Chart (2010)	Position
Irish Albums (IRMA)	50
UK Albums (OCC)	43

== Certifications ==
Region	Certification	Certified units/sales
Ireland (IRMA)	2× Platinum	30,000^{^}
United Kingdom (BPI)	2× Platinum	821,189
^{^} Shipments figures based on certification alone.

== Release history ==
Region	Release date	Label
Ireland	16 October 2009	Syco Music
United Kingdom	19 October 2009	Syco Music
Canada	2 November 2009	Sony Music Entertainment
Switzerland	15 February 2010	Sony Music Entertainment
Austria	19 February 2010	Sony Music Entertainment
Germany	19 February 2010	Sony Music Entertainment
Netherlands	19 February 2010	Sony Music Entertainment
Italy	26 February 2010	Sony Music Entertainment
Japan	26 May 2010	Sony Music Entertainment
Australia	4 June 2010	Sony Music Entertainment

Deluxe edition

Region	Release date	Label
Netherlands	3 December 2010	Sony Music Entertainment
Germany	3 December 2010	Sony Music Entertainment
Ireland	3 December 2010	Syco Music
United Kingdom	6 December 2010	Syco Music
Poland	6 December 2010	Sony Music Entertainment
