= Start Without You =

2010 single by Alexandra Burke

Single by Alexandra Burke featuring Laza Morgan

from the album Overcome (deluxe edition)
- Released: 3 September 2010
- Recorded: 2009–10
- Genre: Reggae fusion; R&B
- Length: 3:33
- Label: Syco
- Songwriters: Nadir "RedOne" Khayat; Savan Kotecha; Julian Bunetta; Kristian Lundin
- Producers: RedOne; RonanDunne

Alexandra Burke singles chronology
"All Night Long" (2010)	"Start Without You" (2010)	"The Silence" (2010)

Laza Morgan singles chronology
"This Girl" (2010)	"Start Without You" (2010)	"Co-Pilot" (2011)

Music video
- "Start Without You" on YouTube

"Start Without You" is a song by British recording artist Alexandra Burke. Featuring vocals from Jamaican American reggae rapper Laza Morgan, it was written by Kristian Lundin, Ronan Dunne, Eddy Grant, Savan Kotecha, Julian Bunetta, and RedOne. The song is an R&B song, which incorporates reggae fusion and dancehall. According to Burke the song was inspired by her Jamaican heritage and her need for a summer song. The song came about after studio sessions booked with RedOne produced a number of new records that were going to be used for a re-release of Overcome or Burke's second album.

The unfinished version leaked online several days before the song was confirmed to before being revealed in its finished form as Burke's new single. It was officially first released for digital download on 3 September 2010, serving as the first single from the re-release of her debut album, Overcome. "Start Without You" received favourable reviews from critics complimenting its summer and dance feel. The song debuted at the top of the singles chart in the United Kingdom, as well as peaking in the top five in Ireland. Its accompanying music video, directed by Max and Dania, features Burke dancing in a lace outfit working out with men in a gym and dancing. Burke performed the song notably a number of times including on Magic Numbers.

== Background ==
In a May 2010 interview with Digital Spy, Burke revealed she recorded new songs with RedOne for either her second album or a re-release of her first studio album, Overcome. However she stated she could not reveal anything until that upcoming August. Then the singer gave an interview where she acknowledged that earlier in the year twenty-four of her songs leaked as part of the forty that leaked from Syco Music, which included material from previous The X Factor winner, Leona Lewis. It was also revealed that an additional song, "Start Without You" leaked on 8 June 2010, a day before she would confirm that the song was, in fact, the first single from the upcoming re-release of Overcome on her official blog. Burke said that the leak had come from within the label and that the suspects were "two little boys in Germany, on work experience." However, Burke did not lament the leak, stating, "It's a shame when music gets put out there when it's not ready, but at the end of the day, it creates buzz and who doesn't love a bit of buzz?"

== Writing and composition ==
"Start Without You"
A sample of "Start Without You", which incorporates reggae fusion and dancehall, featuring the line "drip drop it way down low."

"Start Without You" is an uptempo R&B song which draws from reggae fusion and dancehall influences, with a length of three minutes and thirty-three seconds, penned by RedOne, Bilal Hajji, Savan Kotecha, and Julian Bunetta. It is infused with power pop melodies in the chorus.

== Critical reception ==
While he stated the song wasn't "full throttle" as her past singles, Nick Levine of Digital Spy said the song was danceable, commenting it "manages to be chunky and zesty at the same time." He further complimented its dancefloor appeal, saying, "it's enough to have K.Ro fearing for her 'Commander' title," while preferring the subsequent release of uptempo songs, stating, "At this rate, Burkey's big mobiles-in-the-air moment will just have to wait." Giving the song a perfect five out of five stars review, a Popjustice writer called the song "jaunty." Fraser McAlpine of BBC Chart Blog said called the song "deliriously happy, to the point of being simple-minded, and conjures up instant images of warmth and sunshiney freedom in everyone that hears it." McAlpine also pointed out her label's wise decision to release it right at the ending of summer, with fans pining for more of the vacation season and waiting until Christmas. FemaleFirst said "the track is set to cause a long-lasting heat wave when it hits radio in July" and "will also be blazing club floors across the country once again." The review went on to say that the single "has cemented her place as the UK’s prime female recording artist."

== Chart performance ==
"Start Without You" entered the Irish Singles Chart at number five on 10 September 2010, marking Burke's fifth consecutive Top five hit in Ireland. In the UK, "Start Without You" debuted at number one on the UK Singles Chart on 12 September 2010, knocking fellow X Factor contestant Olly Murs from the top spot with his debut "Please Don't Let Me Go". The single became the singer's fifth number one single, and her third solo number one hit. According to Music Week, in the second week at the top of the charts, the single sold 53,123 copies, the lowest single-week sales for a number-one single in the last fifteen weeks.

== Music video ==
Booked for shooting in June 2010, "Start Without You"'s accompanying music video was shot in August 2010, and directed by Max and Dania.

The music video of consists of three scenes, in which Burke wearing a black leotard accompanied by male dancers. Another shows Burke and semi-naked male gymnasts exercising, whilst another shows Burke donning the lace outfit singing and dancing in front of a glitter wall, while Laza Morgan does also. The video begins with Burke singing the opening line of the song and performing various dance moves. This scene is intercut by Laza Morgan who begins to perform his lines and introducing himself and Burke. The next scene shows Burke and the male gymnasts exercising/dancing in a gym then beginning a dance routine. Subsequently, in the chorus is Burke and her male dancers performing the main dance routine which is occasionally interrupted to show shots of Burke in the gym and singing in front of the glitter wall.

Popjustice said that the video "somehow manages to go beyond traditional ideas of good and bad and exists instead on a different plane where concepts of positive and negative no longer exist." Preferring "Bad Boys" to the clip, saying that the denim and motorbike were gone, Ryan Love of Digital Spy said the video must have had a tighter budget, and that the half-naked men doing gymnastics brought a whole new meaning to the word "camptastic."

== Live performances and promotion ==
Burke has performed the song notably many times, including at outdoor venues at T4 on the Beach, 95.8 Capital FM's Summertime Ball, and the Midlands Music Festival, which all took place during the summer of 2010. She appeared and performed the song on televised appearances during Alan Carr: Chatty Man, on 15 August 2010, and on Magic Numbers. Burke also appeared at the Help for Heroes concert in the UK and performed the song. On 19 November 2010, Burke appeared and performed the song as part of the line up for Children In Need 2010.

== Track listing ==
UK CD Single
No.	Title	Length
1.	"Start Without You"	3:33
2.	"Start Without You" (StoneBridge Club Mix)	7:04

UK & AUS Digital EP
No.	Title	Length
1.	"Start Without You"	3:33
2.	"Start Without You" (StoneBridge Club Mix)	7:04
3.	"Start Without You" (StoneBridge Smokin Dub')	6:11

== Credits ==
- Songwriters - Julian Bunetta, Kristian Lundin, Nadir "RedOne" Khayat, Savan Kotecha
- Producer, programming, instruments, vocal editing, recording, engineer - RedOne
- Audio mixing - Phil Tan
- Vocal editing, recording, engineer - Trevor Muzzy

== Charts ==
=== Weekly charts ===
Chart (2010)	Peak position
Belgium (Ultratip Bubbling Under Flanders)	10
Czech Republic Airplay (ČNS IFPI)	61
Europe (European Hot 100 Singles)	7
Ireland (IRMA)	5
Netherlands (Single Top 100)	77
Poland (Polish Airplay New)	4
Poland (Video Chart)	2
Scotland Singles (Official Charts)	1
Slovakia Airplay (ČNS IFPI)	62
South Korea International (Gaon)	46
UK Singles (Official Charts)	1

=== Year-end charts ===
Chart (2010)	Position
UK Singles (OCC)	82

== Certifications ==
Region	Certification	Certified units/sales
United Kingdom (BPI)	Silver	200,000^{^}
^{^} Shipments figures based on certification alone.

== Release history ==
Region	Date	Format	Label	Ref.
Australia	3 September 2010	Digital download	Sony Music Entertainment	
Ireland	3 September 2010	Digital download, CD single	Sony Music Entertainment	
United Kingdom	5 September 2010	Digital download	Syco Music	
United Kingdom	6 September 2010	CD single	Syco Music	

== See also ==
- List of number-one singles and albums (Scotland)
- List of number-one singles from the 2010s (UK)
