= Laza Morgan =

Jamaican-American singer and rapper (born 1976)

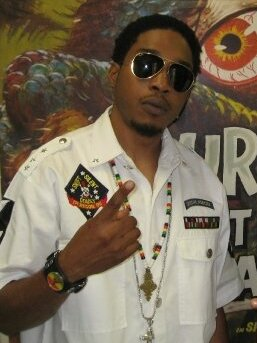
- Laza Morgan in 2010
- Born: December 13, 1976 (age 49); Springfield, Massachusetts, U.S.
- Occupations: Singer; rapper
- Musical career
- Genres: Reggae; pop rap; dancehall

Laza Morgan (born December 13, 1976, in Springfield, Massachusetts) is a Jamaican American reggae singer and rapper. The son of reggae musician and artist Denroy Morgan, he started as a member of the Jamaican dancehall / hip hop trio formation LMS, alongside his siblings Noshayah Morgan and Miriam Morgan. Later on Otiyah "Laza" pursued a solo singing career.

He is best known for his single "This Girl" which was featured on Disney's Step Up 3D. Laza was also a featured artist on Alexandra Burke's hit single "Start Without You" in 2010 and appeared in the music video for the song. Laza is also featured in Kristina Maria's new single "Co-Pilot". He later released his mixed tape on June 7, 2011, after releasing his new hit single "One by One" featuring Jamaican singer Mavado, which topped the Jamaican Reggae Singles Chart. More recently Laza had launched two viral music videos on YouTube for his singles "Ballerina" and "Ya Sey Mi" with his production team Family Affair Productions. Laza's latest project is an EP titled Touch me with silence available for download on most music streaming services.

== Discography ==
=== Singles ===
==== As lead artist ====
Year	Single	Peak positions	Certifications	Album
Year	Single	FR	Certifications	Album
2010	"This Girl"	—	—	Non-album singles
2012	"One by One" (featuring Mavado)	34	—	Non-album singles
2013	"All She Wants (Gone Tomorrow)" (featuring Jayden)	177	—	Non-album singles
2013	"All She Wants (Gone Tomorrow)" (featuring Nancy Logan)	—	—	Non-album singles

==== As featured artist ====
List of singles, with selected chart positions
Year	Title	Peak chart positions						Certifications	Album
Year	Title	UK	BEL	CAN	IRE	NLD	SCO	Certifications	Album
2010	"Start Without You" (Alexandra Burke featuring Laza Morgan)	1	60	—	5	77	1		Overcome
2011	"Co-Pilot" (Kristina Maria featuring Laza Morgan)	—	—	26	—	—	—		Tell the World
2011	"Get Fresh With You" (Teddybears featuring Laza Morgan)	—	—	—	—	—	—		Devil's Music
