= Co-Pilot (song) =

Song by Kristina Maria

Single by Kristina Maria feat. Laza Morgan

from the album Tell the World
- Released: 12 July 2011
- Recorded: 2011
- Genre: Dance-pop, electropop
- Label: Lupo One
- Songwriter(s): Julian Bunetta, Kristina Maria Chalhoub, Kristian Lundin, Otiyah Morgan

Kristina Maria singles chronology
"Let's Play" (2011)	"Co-Pilot" (2011)	"Our Song Comes On" (2012)

Laza Morgan singles chronology
"Co-Pilot" (2011)

"Co-Pilot"

Single by Kristina Maria feat. Corneille
- Released: 2012
- Recorded: 2012
- Genre: Dance-pop, electropop
- Label: Lupo One
- Songwriter(s): Julian Bunetta, Kristina Maria Chalhoub, Kristian Lundin, Otiyah Morgan

Kristina Maria singles chronology
"Our Song Comes On" (2012)	"Co-Pilot" (2012)	"Animal" (2012)

Corneille singles chronology
"Des pères, des hommes et des frères" (2011)	"Co-Pilot" (2012)

Music video
- "Co-Pilot" (French version) on YouTube

"Co-Pilot"

Single by Corneille
- Released: 2012
- Recorded: 2012
- Genre: Dance-pop, electropop
- Songwriter(s): Julian Bunetta, Kristina Maria Chalhoub, Kristian Lundin, Otiyah Morgan

"Co-Pilot" is a 2011 song by Canadian singer Kristina Maria featuring Laza Morgan in its original English version. The song appears in Kristina Maria's album Tell the World and the single is the third single taken from her album after "FML X2" and "Let's Play". The song was a success reaching #26 on Billboard's Canadian Hot 100.

Maria also recorded a bilingual English and French version of the song for the francophone markets in Canada and France, featuring the Canadian singer Corneille where Maria sings the English parts and Corneille the French parts. That version reached #47 on SNEP, the official French Singles Chart.

== Charts ==
Kristina Maria / Laza Morgan version

Chart (2011)	Peak position
Canadian Hot 100	26

Kristina Maria / Corneille version

Chart (2012)	Peak position
Ultratip Belgium Singles Chart (Wallonia)	1
SNEP French Singles Chart	33

Corneille version

Chart (2012)	Peak position
SNEP French Singles Chart	27
