= Broken Heels =

Single by Alexandra Burke

from the album Overcome
- Released: 18 January 2010
- Recorded: 2009
- Genre: Dance-pop; synthpop; R&B
- Length: 3:35 (single); 4:10 (album)
- Label: Syco
- Songwriters: Nadir Khayat; Bilal Hajji; Savan Kotecha
- Producer: RedOne

Alexandra Burke singles chronology
"Bad Boys" (2009)	"Broken Heels" (2010)	"All Night Long" (2010)

"Broken Heels" is a song performed by British singer Alexandra Burke, released as the second single from her 2009 debut album, Overcome. It was written by the Moroccan-Swedish producer RedOne, Bilal Hajji, Savan Kotecha and produced by RedOne. The single was released on digital download in the United Kingdom on 17 January 2010 and physically on the following day, on 18 January 2010. It peaked at number 8 on the UK Singles Chart on 24 January 2010.

== Writing and inspiration ==
"Broken Heels" was written by Bilal Hajji, Savan Kotecha and RedOne (who also produced the song). In an interview with IVillage, Alexandra Burke revealed that she had a lot of say in the making of the song because she did not want to be a "toy" or "robot" in the song's development process. Burke, in an interview with Popjustice, elaborated on her experience of working with RedOne. She said,

I've got to say, Red was the one who basically got my personality out first. Then everything else slipped into place like a puzzle. Red really started it off for me. He had [the song] already ready for me, right? And then I walked in, and he met me, and he was like, "scrap every song we've just prepared for you, we're going to start from scratch, because you're not the person I thought you would be.' So then he wrote [the song] according to my personality.

"Broken Heels" came about through a conversation between Burke and RedOne when her footwear made more of an impression than his original song choice. Burke explained, "We started getting into a conversation about why I wear high heels and then the title 'Broken Heels' came up and the song grew out of that." Nick Levine from Digital Spy interperated the song as carrying a good-natured girl power message. Fraser McAlpine of the BBC reviewed the lyrical meaning of "Broken Heels" as follows: "It's basically another one of those "girls are better than boys, right girls?" diva brag-jobs, and effectively puts forward the idea that even if a woman is hobbled by uneven footwear she can still kick man-ass when it comes to gold medal standard Olympic partying." Popjustice said that "Broken Heels" is "a song in which Alexandra explains that she can dance as well as a man, and she can do it even better if her shoes are broken."

== Composition ==
Alexandra Burke "Broken Heels"
A 30 second sample of Burke's "Broken Heels" where the chorus is played backed by the "Hey-ey-ey/Hey-ey-ey" hook.

Musically "Broken Heels" is an up-tempo dance-pop, synthpop and R&B song with a dance-oriented beat. "Broken Heels" has a distinctly faster tempo than Burke's previous single "Bad Boys". The song opens with Burke singing the "Hey-ey-ey/Hey-ey-ey" hook which transitions into a spoken portion where Burke says: "RedOne, you know I can do it better than you/I can do it even better in broken heels". The song's middle 8 features Burke singing a "Oh, oh, oh, oh, oh, oh, oh, oh/Oh, oh, oh, oh, oh, oh, oh" hook.

According to Fraser McAlpine of the BBC the music is best suited for dancefloors. Derby Evening Telegraph says it consists of huge beats. Alexis Petridis from The Guardian felt that the clattering rhythm has influences from the music of 70s British rock band Adam and the Ants. While Popjustice wrote that it recalled a RedOne take on Alesha Dixon's "The Boy Does Nothing" (2008). The song is set in the time signature of common time with a metronome of 165.9 beats per minute. It is composed in the key of E minor. The track is written in verse-chorus form and its instrumentation comes from the guitar and electronic keyboard.

Lyrically, "Broken Heels" is written in the first person and was inspired by Burke's personality and a conversation she had with RedOne with regard to why she wears heels. It refers to the strength of women which can enable them to do things better than men, even when they are wearing broken heels which contrasts as a simile for the song meaning.

== Music video ==
Burke and her female backing dancers dressed in gold leotards with American football-style shoulder pads and heeled shoes, perform the outdoor dance sequence of the video. The scenes are intercut with shots of the group changing and Burke in a green-lit tunnel.

The music video for "Broken Heels" was filmed in Los Angeles on 22 and 23 November 2009, as confirmed by Burke's official Twitter page. It was choreographed by Frank Gatson and JaQuel Knight, who have also worked with Beyoncé. The music video consists of Burke and several female dancers. It premiered on UK music video channel The Box 11 December 2009, playing hourly. It received positive reaction from Nick Levine of Digital Spy who noted that: "It's essentially a massive tum-flashing, tush-shaking dance routine set in the middle of an American football pitch." The video begins with Burke singing into a mirror in a locker room, with a team of female American football players getting ready behind. Interspersed are shots of male players doing the same. The next scene shows the two teams emerging from the stadium tunnels. Burke and the female team then begin a dance routine, which is occasionally interrupted to show shots of Burke in a green-lit tunnel. Throughout the video Burke is seen wearing two different outfits; a #17 full length leotard and a #18 crop top midriff-baring outfit. Burke said that "[the video is] going to show people that no matter what your shape, colour, size, whatever you are, you are still beautiful."

== Track listing ==
- Digital single
1. "Broken Heels" (Single Mix) – 3:34
2. "Broken Heels" (Cutmore Club Mix) – 6:27
- CD single
1. "Broken Heels" (Single Mix) – 3:34
2. "Broken Heels" (Cutmore Radio Mix) – 3:16
3. "Broken Heels" (Digital Dog Club Mix) – 6:27

Digital EP

1. "Broken Heels" (Single Mix) – 3:34
2. "Broken Heels" (Cutmore Club Mix) – 6:12
3. "Broken Heels" (Cutmore Radio Mix) – 3:16
4. "Broken Heels" (Digital Dog Club Mix) – 6:27
5. "Broken Heels" (Digital Dog Dub) - 5:57

== Credits and personnel ==
- Songwriting – RedOne, Bilal Hajji, Savan Kotecha
- Production – RedOne
- Instruments and programming – RedOne
- Guitar – Johnny Severin
- Vocal arrangement – RedOne
- Vocal editing – RedOne, Johnny Severin
- Recording – RedOne, Johnny Severin
- Engineering – RedOne, Johnny Severin
- Main vocals – Alexandra Burke
- Background vocals – Alexandra Burke, RedOne, Savan Kotecha
- Mixing – Robert Orton

== Promotion ==
Burke first televised promotion of the song was at the 2009 Royal Variety Performance. The song was also performed at Capital FM's Jingle Bell Ball at The O_{2} Arena. Burke also performed the song on The Paul O'Grady Show on 17 December 2009. Burke performed on So You Think You Can Dance and GMTV on 16 and 19 January 2010, respectively. "Broken Heels" was released in Australia. She performed it on London Wasps' St George's Game on 24 April 2010 and T4 On The Beach on 4 July 2010.

As per the music video Burke generally wore two different outfits during live performances promoting the song. She wore the #17 full length outfit when performing on So You Think You Can Dance and GMTV, but the #18 crop top midriff-baring version of the outfit at the Royal Variety Performance, The Paul O'Grady Show and The Alan Titchmarsh Show.

In the United States, Broken Heels appeared on freshman The CW show, Hellcats, during its pilot, which aired 8 September 2010.

The song was also featured in commercials and the Red Band Trailer for the 2011 release Bridesmaids.

== Critical reception ==
Professional ratings
Review scores
Source	Rating
Digital Spy	4/5 stars
BBC	4/5 stars

Nick Levine from the entertainment website Digital Spy gave to the song four stars (out of five) and says that: " it's a rubber-bottomed pop stomper with loads of 'heyeyey' and 'oh-oh-oh-oh' hooks, a good-natured girl power message and more sass than a drag queen who's just been told (s)he doesn't meet the dress code. The result? Yet more evidence that Alexandra Burke is turning into a cracking - no pun intended - little popstar". Fraser McAlpine from the BBC gave "Broken Heels" a four out of five star rating, saying: "this is definitely, decisively and preposterously aimed at the dancefloor, specifically the people on the dancefloor with the handbags and the lipstick - the ones that tend to do most of the dancing. It's basically another one of those "girls are better than boys, right girls?" diva brag-jobs, and effectively puts forward the idea that even if a woman is hobbled by uneven footwear she can still kick man-ass when it comes to gold medal standard Olympic partying. Derby Evening Telegraph said that "Broken Heels" shows that "Burke still has the 'X Factor'", positively reviewing the song: "A killer dancefloor filler, with huge beats that infect from the first few seconds, 'Broken Heels' continues to stomp for a full three-and-a-half minutes of near pop perfection." Hull Daily Mail named "Broken Heels" as their 'Download of the Week' on 23 January 2010, saying that the song is "an attitude heavy pop number" and "a good song which will be a club hit". Alexis Petridis from The Guardian said that "Broken Heels" is "the only real sonic surprise" on Overcome, further describing the song as having a clattering rhythm which bears improbable influence from 70s British rock band Adam and the Ants. Petridis went on to say that the song certainly is a "spectacularly polished product". Newsround said: "'Broken Heels' is a sassy floor-filler that makes you want to get up and dance." OK! called the track "catchy funky R&B pop". Robbie Daw of Idolator said that "Broken Heels" is a "dance jam".

Tom Howard of Yahoo! Music UK named "Broken Heels", along with "Dumb" and "You Broke My Heart" as the best songs on Overcome.

Popjustice said that the song was "one of the more carefree numbers" on the album, describing it as: "A song in which Alexandra explains that she can dance as well as a man, and she can do it even better if her shoes are broken." The website went on to deem "Broken Heels" as RedOne's take on Alesha Dixon's "The Boy Does Nothing" (2008).

== Chart performance ==
"Broken Heels" entered the UK Singles Chart at number 36 on 26 December 2009 and over a period of five weeks climbed to its peak of number eight. The single spent two weeks in the UK Top 10, then fell to number 11 on 31 January 2010. It spent 22 weeks in the UK Top 100. It was confirmed to have sold over 400,000 copies in the UK, therefore achieving a gold single certification. It also entered the Irish Singles Chart at number 25 in December 2009 and peaked at number five, becoming her third top five hit there.

== Charts ==
=== Weekly charts ===
Chart (2010)	Peak position
European Hot 100 Singles (Billboard)	26
Ireland (IRMA)	5
Poland Airplay (ZPAV)	3
Scottish Singles Sales (Official Charts)	7
Slovakia Airplay (ČNS IFPI)	17
UK Singles (Official Charts)	8

=== Year-end charts ===
Chart (2010)	Position
UK Singles (OCC)	85

== Certifications ==
Region	Certification	Certified units/sales
United Kingdom (BPI)	Gold	400,000^{‡}
^{‡} Sales+streaming figures based on certification alone.

== Release history ==
Region	Format	Date	Label
Ireland	Digital download	8 January 2010	Syco
United Kingdom	Digital download	8 January 2010	Syco
United Kingdom	CD single	18 January 2010	Syco
Slovakia	Airplay	18 January 2010	Sony
Poland	Airplay	15 May 2010	Sony
