= All Night Long (Alexandra Burke song) =

2010 single by Alexandra Burke

Single by Alexandra Burke featuring Pitbull

from the album Overcome
- Released: 3 May 2010
- Recorded: 2009
- Genre: Dance-pop; R&B
- Length: 4:23 (album version); 3:48 (single version)
- Label: Syco
- Songwriters: Richard Butler; James Scheffer; Louis Biancaniello; Sam Watters
- Producers: Jim Jonsin; Louis Biancaniello; Sam Watters; Rico Love

Alexandra Burke singles chronology
"Broken Heels" (2010)	"All Night Long" (2010)	"Start Without You" (2010)

Pitbull singles chronology
"Maldito Alcohol" (2010)	"All Night Long" (2010)	"I Like It" (2010)

Music video
- "All Night Long" on YouTube

"All Night Long" is a song performed by British singer Alexandra Burke, taken from her debut studio album, Overcome (2009). The song was written and produced by American production team The Runaways (Rico Love, Jim Jonsin, Sam Watters and Louis Biancaniello). The single was remixed to feature rapper Pitbull and released as the album's fourth official single in 2010, peaking at number four on the UK Singles Chart on 23 May.

== Background ==
For its release as Burke's third single from the album, it was remixed with new instruments and featured vocals from Miami rapper Pitbull. "All Night Long" also served as the album's second European single. The song was nominated for BRIT Award for Best British Single.

== Music video ==
According to a spread in Look magazine, the music video for "All Night Long" was shot in a Hertfordshire mansion in the UK. The video follows the theme of a pool-side party and amongst the back-up dancers it features circus performers as well as appearances from Pitbull who is featured on the single remix. In one scene Burke is seen with "a mohawk, bejewelled eye-lids and long legs in a leather jock-strap". The video was directed by Dale Resteghini a.k.a. RAGE and premiered on 27 April 2010 through Vevo. Australian TV channel Channel 7 created a new music video for the song which used excerpts from the actual music video and some new parts from Australian dance troupe and winner of Season 4 of Australia's Got Talent, Justice Crew.

== Live performances ==
Burke performed the new version (minus Pitbull's vocals) on the semi-final of Dancing on Ice on ITV1 on 21 March 2010. and the National Lottery on 5 May 2010. She also performed on Hey Hey It's Saturday, an Australian television show, on 3 June 2010 to promote the single and the release of the album there.

== Reception ==
Robert Copsey from the entertainment website Digital Spy gave to the song four stars out of five, saying: "Fortunately, the track - much like the video - is the very definition of a summer party stomper. Reswizzled with extra blips and beats from the album version, you'll barely have time to knock back your G&T before the urge to hit the dancefloor kicks in, largely thanks to a chorus that doesn't so much encourage you to raise your arms in the air as command it.". "Fraser McAlpine" from BBC gave the song 5 stars (out of 5), saying that: "well it's just a brilliant song. It's sung brilliantly, with brilliant barking-angel harmonies and brilliant rumble-tum verses and brilliant cloudbustingly euphoric choruses. Alexandra sounds every inch the disco diva - by which I mean she sounds torn apart by the wonder of the emotions she is experiencing, even though lyrically, those emotions amount to nothing more than a simple description of meeting someone you fancy at a party. That Grape Juice said that "I'm still waiting to hear that 'mind-blowing' track I just know Ms. Burke has in her to deliver." and BBC Newsround said that "Her voice is earthy and gravelly, and really cool on this single."

== Chart performance ==
"All Night Long" first entered the UK Singles Chart at number 98 in October 2009 following the release of Overcome, before re-entering at number 59 in March 2010, following strong digital downloads. After climbing up the chart throughout April and May 2010, the single entered the top 10 on 16 May 2010 at number eight, marking Burke's fourth consecutive top-10 single. The following week, the single climbed four places to its peak of number four, beating Burke's previous single "Broken Heels" which reached number eight. The single spent 25 weeks in the UK top 100. The single entered the Irish Singles Chart at number 16 and peaked at number one, making it her third number one single in Ireland. The single entered at number 39 on the Dutch Top 40 and peaked at number 24. "All Night Long" first entered the Australian Charts at number 71 and four weeks later reached a peak of number 48.

== Track listings ==
- UK CD single / Australian CD single
1. "All Night Long" (featuring Pitbull) (Richard Butler, James Scheffer, Louis Biancaniello, Sam Watters) - 3:48
2. "All Night Long" (Cahill Club Mix) - 5:56
- UK digital download
1. "All Night Long" (featuring Pitbull) - 3:48
2. "All Night Long" (featuring Pitbull) (Cahill Club Mix) - 5:56
3. "All Night Long" (featuring Pitbull) (Jason Nevins Remix) - 3:58
- German CD single
1. "All Night Long" (featuring Pitbull) - 3:48
2. "All Night Long" (Album Version) - 4:23
- German download
1. "All Night Long" (featuring Pitbull) - 3:48
2. "All Night Long" (Album Version) - 4:23
3. "All Night Long" (Cahill Club Mix) - 5:56

== Charts ==
=== Weekly charts ===
Chart (2010)	Peak position
Australia (ARIA)	48
Australian Urban (ARIA)	10
Belgium (Ultratip Bubbling Under Flanders)	7
CIS Airplay (TopHit)	159
Czech Republic Airplay (ČNS IFPI)	82
Europe (European Hot 100 Singles)	14
Germany (GfK)	60
Ireland (IRMA)	1
Netherlands (Dutch Top 40)	24
Netherlands (Single Top 100)	61
Poland (Polish Airplay New)	1
Scottish Singles Sales (Official Charts)	3
Slovakia Airplay (ČNS IFPI)	24
South Korea International (Gaon)	96
Sweden (Sverigetopplistan)	57
Switzerland (Schweizer Hitparade)	60
UK Singles (Official Charts)	4

=== Year-end charts ===
Chart (2010)	Position
UK Singles (OCC)	76

== Certifications ==
Region	Certification	Certified units/sales
Sweden (GLF)	Platinum	40,000^{‡}
United Kingdom (BPI)	Gold	400,000^{‡}
^{‡} Sales+streaming figures based on certification alone.

== Release history ==
Region	Date	Format	Label	Catalogue
Denmark	3 May 2010	Digital download	Sony Music Entertainment	
Mexico	3 May 2010	Digital download	Sony Music Entertainment	
Ireland	7 May 2010	Digital download	Syco Music	
United Kingdom	16 May 2010	Digital download	Syco Music	88697686132
United Kingdom	17 May 2010	CD single	Syco Music	88697686132
Sweden	17 May 2010	Digital download	Sony Music Entertainment	
Australia	4 June 2010	CD; digital download	Sony Music Entertainment	88697686132
Germany	11 June 2010	CD; digital download	Sony Music Entertainment	
Austria	11 June 2010	CD; digital download	Sony Music Entertainment	
Switzerland	11 June 2010	CD; digital download	Sony Music Entertainment	
