= Syco Music =

British record label

- Parent company: Syco Entertainment
- Founded: 2002; 24 years ago (original); 2026; 0 years ago (relaunch)
- Founder: Simon Cowell
- Defunct: 2020 (original)
- Distributors: Sony Music (until 2020); Universal Music (since 2026)
- Genre: Various
- Country of origin: United Kingdom

Syco Records, also known as S Records, Simco Limited, and Syco Music at various points in time, is a division of Syco Entertainment which originally operated from 2002 until 2020, that was relaunched in 2026. The label was founded by British entrepreneur, record executive and media personality Simon Cowell, who was formerly employed at Bertelsmann Music Group (BMG).

Early-on, the label oversaw music releases by such acts as Robson & Jerome, Five, Westlife and Teletubbies. Eventually, BMG (renamed to Sony BMG) bought Cowell's share in both Syco Music and Syco Television. In 2010, Cowell and Sony Music entered a joint venture agreement that would see Cowell and Sony each own 50% of the new Syco Entertainment company, which encompassed both the previous Syco TV and Syco Music divisions.

Over its original 18-year run, Syco had multiple, globally-known acts signed, such as the girl groups Fifth Harmony and Little Mix (as well as the solo efforts of former Fifth Harmony member Camila Cabello, following her departure), British boyband One Direction, and the Latin American boyband CNCO. In July 2020, Sony sold the rights to the television formats and assets back to Cowell, effectively divesting all of Syco's non-music divisions. As part of the venture, its current roster and majority of back catalog became part of Sony Music.

The label returned in 2026, partnering with Universal Music's EMI and Republic Records to release music from December 10, a boy band formed on Simon Cowell's Netflix series The Next Act in 2025.

== History ==
Syco Music had offices in London and Los Angeles and was home to several artists. As S Records, the company oversaw music releases by Robson & Jerome, Five, Westlife and Teletubbies.

Later following television franchises, Syco had the exclusive right to sign winners and finalists of The X Factor and Got Talent. Susan Boyle's debut album, I Dreamed a Dream, has sold over 9 million copies, making it one of the best selling releases of the 2000s and Syco's most successful release to date. Between 2004 and 2009, Il Divo achieved four multi-million selling albums and in 2007, Leona Lewis became one of the most successful talent show winners when her second single, "Bleeding Love", propelled the album Spirit to 9 million global sales.

In 2010, Syco began diversifying by adding producer/singer-songwriter Labrinth. Savan Kotecha, who had been writing for Syco acts for several years, also became an A&R Director and set up a joint venture, Kanani Songs. Syco also began forming closer partnerships with other Sony Music Entertainment UK labels. For the first time, Syco entered into an agreement with Columbia Records that would see them work together to launch the career of a The X Factor winner - Matt Cardle. That same year, Sony Music bought Cowell's share of Syco, for around £27 million.

On 15 July 2020, it was announced that Cowell would buy Sony's stake in Syco Entertainment; Sony Music will retain Syco Music's artists and back catalogue. By September 2020, managing director Tyler Brown and head of digital Tom Hoare had left. Music Week reported that the label is no longer operational and is now defunct; artist staff have been redeployed elsewhere within Sony Music, including at sister label RCA Records, or have left completely.

=== Logos ===
2002–2013 (black background)

2002–2013 (white background)

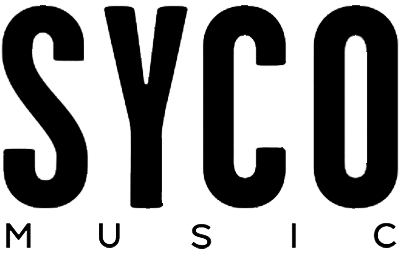
2013–2020

== Artists ==
Some of the artists signed by Cowell, such as band Westlife, released their music through S Records, another company formed by Cowell whose share he then sold to BMG in 2003. Syco Music started releasing music as a label in 2004.

=== Current Artists ===
- December 10

=== Artists at time of closure ===
- Bars and Melody (Leondre Devries and Charlie Lenehan)
- James Arthur (joint deal with Columbia Records)
- Susan Boyle (full UK deal and joint US deal with Columbia Records)
- Collabro
- CNCO
- Labrinth
- Digital Farm Animals
- PRETTYMUCH
- Grace VanderWaal
- Grace Davies
- LSD
- Acacia & Aaliyah
- Courtney Hadwin (joint deal with Arista Records)
- Megan McKenna
- Real Like You

=== Former artists ===
- Steve Brookstein (2004–2005)
- Bianca Ryan (2006–2008)
- George Sampson (2008)
- Angelis (2006–2007)
- Leon Jackson (2007–2009)
- Same Difference (2007–2009)
- Rhydian Roberts (2007–2010)
- Paul Potts (2007–2010)
- Escala (2008–2010)
- Shayne Ward (2005–2011)
- Joe McElderry (2009–2011)
- Westlife (2007–2011)
- Matt Cardle (2010–2012)
- Jackie Evancho (2010–2013)
- Ronan Parke (2011–2012)
- Alexandra Burke (2008–2012)
- Loveable Rogues (2012–2013)
- Leona Lewis (2006–2014)
- Jonathan and Charlotte (2012–2014))
- Sam Bailey (2013–2015)
- Tamera Foster (2014–2016)
- Melanie Amaro (2011–2013)
- Forte (2013–2014)
- Rachel Crow (2011–2015)
- Emblem3 (2012–2015)
- Chris Rene (2011–2014)
- Bea Miller (2013–2017)
- Ben Haenow (2014–2016)
- One Direction (2010–2016)
- Reggie 'n' Bollie (2016–2017)
- Fleur East (2014–2017)
- Ella Henderson (2013–2018)
- Alex & Sierra (2013–2015)
- Rebecca Ferguson (2010–2016)
- Louisa Johnson (2015–2018)
- Little Mix (2011–2018)
- Rak-Su (2017–2018)
- Fifth Harmony (2013–2018)
- Louis Tomlinson (2017–2020)
- Dalton Harris (2018–2020)
- Tokio Myers (2017–2020)

== Theft and copyright ==
Syco Music and its artists have been the targets of illegal hacking on several separate occasions; in 2009, ahead of the release of her sophomore album, Echo, a number of Leona Lewis' unfinished demos and leftover songs from the recording process were leaked online. An investigation was launched by the International Federation of the Phonographic Industry (IFPI), in-tandem with the record label and police, to identify those responsible. Alexandra Burke was also targeted, having two demo versions of songs from her debut album, Overcome, leaked before the album's release. At the end of March 2010, it was reported that Syco had suffered, once again, from hackers who had managed to obtain 14 of Burke's previously-unheard studio recordings, as well as 26 more from Lewis.

Following the second incident of leaks, Cowell contacted the FBI to track down those responsible. Included amongst the leaked music was a newly recorded version of Burke's "All Night Long", featuring Cuban-American rapper Pitbull, which was tipped-off to be the singer's third single in March 2010. According to Burke, the songs were leaked by "Two little boys in Germany on work experience" who had been interning for Syco. It was later revealed, in 2011, that songs recorded for Echo were targeted by German hacker "Deniz A." (also known as "DJ Stolen"); in July 2010, the Rasch law firm logged a criminal complaint against DJ Stolen for "constantly placing hacked songs on the internet". Within the songs listed in the complaint was one titled "Pulse", described at the time as a new recording by Leona Lewis. In June 2011, DJ Stolen was caught and subsequently jailed for 18 months.

In 2011, in a change of course, Syco found itself being taken to court for plagiarism when it was reported that a new Lewis song, "Collide", significantly used elements of "Fade Into Darkness", a 2010 song by Swedish house music DJ Avicii. The DJ took both Lewis and Syco to the British High Court just prior to the track's release. However, the case was resolved out-of-court, by agreeing to release the song as a joint effort between both artists; the single was released on 4 September 2011. In February 2013, it was announced that One Direction would be releasing a mashup cover version of "One Way or Another" (1978 song by Blondie) and "Teenage Kicks" (1977 song by the Undertones) as the 2013 Comic Relief single; an unfinished version of the track was leaked online and, on 7 February 2013, Syco launched an investigation. A spokesperson told the press, "It is very disappointing that the song has been leaked and we are currently investigating the matter".

== Controversies and criticism ==
Syco was the label that all X Factor winners were signed to as part of their contract for winning the show, along with other acts hand-picked by Cowell. Most of the artists who were once signed to the record label had complained about their deals with the music mogul, which often saw them making little to no money from their contracts; they were also overworked, while many had also complained about creative differences concerning the music they wanted to release.

In 2021, musical twins Jedward claimed the record label Syco was 'toxic' and 'abusive'. It came after news broke that The X Factor would not be returning to television, prompting the duo to reflect on their time on the show, which they appeared on back in 2009. The duo took to social media and said "Every contestant on the X Factor was a slave to the show and got paid zero while they made millions! The fact every contestant has to act like their judge mentors them! When in reality all they care about is their paycheck!." Jedward also alleged that artists on the show and under Cowell's record label, Syco Music, were unable to speak freely and were blacklisted if they did. They were isolated from their families and were watched and reported on by security. They claimed that the judges on The X Factor did not actually mentor the contestants as the show made it appear.

Their comments came after former X Factor contestants spoke out about the conditions they were expected to work under while signed to the label, including Rebecca Ferguson and Cher Lloyd. Lloyd took to TikTok to take a sly dig at the label, which she appeared to accuse of 'exploiting' her and taking all the money made by her music. Meanwhile, Ferguson met with Digital, Culture, Media, and Sport Secretary Oliver Dowden earlier that year, calling for better protection for artists in the music industry.

== Number-one singles ==
Artist	Single	Year	Countries
Westlife	"Unbreakable"	2002	UK, IRE, SCO
Westlife	"Tonight/Miss You Nights"	2002	IRE
Westlife	"Mandy"	2003	UK, IRE, SCO
Steve Brookstein	"Against All Odds (Take a Look at Me Now)"	2004	UK, IRE
Westlife	"You Raise Me Up"	2005	UK, IRE, SCO
Shayne Ward	"That's My Goal"	2005	UK, IRE
Westlife	"The Rose"	2006	UK, IRE, SCO
Shayne Ward	"No Promises"	2006	IRE
Leona Lewis	"A Moment Like This"	2006	UK, IRE
Leona Lewis	"Bleeding Love"	2007	UK, AUS, AUT, CAN, GER, IRE, NZ, SWI, US
Shayne Ward	"If That's OK with You"	2007	IRE
Leon Jackson	"When You Believe"	2007	UK, IRE, SCO
Leona Lewis	"Run"	2008	UK, AUT, IRE
Leon Jackson	"Don't Call This Love"	2008	SCO
Alexandra Burke	"Hallelujah"	2008	UK, IRE, SCO
Alexandra Burke	"Bad Boys"	2009	UK, IRE, SCO
The X Factor Finalists 2009	"You Are Not Alone"	2009	UK, IRE, SCO
Joe McElderry	"The Climb"	2009	UK, IRE, SCO
Helping Haiti	"Everybody Hurts"	2010	UK, IRE
Olly Murs	"Please Don't Let Me Go"	2010	UK
Alexandra Burke	"All Night Long"	2010	IRE
The X Factor Finalists 2010	"Heroes"	2010	UK, IRE, SCO
Alexandra Burke	"Start Without You"	2010	UK, SCO
Matt Cardle	"When We Collide"	2010	UK, IRE, SCO
Cher Lloyd	"Swagger Jagger"	2011	UK, SCO
Jackie Evancho featuring Barbra Streisand	"Somewhere"	2011	US Class
Olly Murs featuring Rizzle Kicks	"Heart Skips a Beat"	2011	UK, GER, POL, SWI
One Direction	"What Makes You Beautiful"	2011	UK, IRE, MEX, SCO
Olly Murs	"Dance with Me Tonight"	2011	UK, SCO
The X Factor Finalists 2011 featuring JLS and One Direction	Wishing on a Star	2011	UK, IRE, SCO
Little Mix	"Cannonball"	2011	UK, IRE, SCO
Chris Rene	"Young Homie"	2012	NZ
Little Mix	"Wings"	2012	UK, IRE, SCO
One Direction	"Live While We're Young"	2012	IRE, NZ
Olly Murs featuring Flo Rida	"Troublemaker"	2012	UK, HUN, SCO
One Direction	"Little Things"	2012	UK, SCO
Labrinth featuring Emeli Sandé	"Beneath Your Beautiful"	2012	UK, IRE, SCO
James Arthur	"Impossible"	2012	UK, IRE, POL, SCO, SPA, GRE, LUX, SLO
One Direction	"One Way or Another (Teenage Kicks)"	2013	UK, DEN, IRE, POL, NL, SCO
Olly Murs	"Dear Darlin'"	2013	AUT
One Direction	"Story of My Life"	2013	DEN, FIN, IRE, NZ
Sam Bailey	"Skyscraper"	2013	UK, IRE, SCO
Ella Henderson	"Ghost"	2014	UK, IRE, SCO
Ben Haenow	"Something I Need"	2014	UK, SCO
Fifth Harmony featuring Kid Ink	"Worth It"	2015	ISR, LBN, MEX
Little Mix	"Black Magic"	2015	UK, SCO, EUR
One Direction	"Drag Me Down"	2015	UK, SCO, HUN, IRE, NZ, AUT, AUS
One Direction	"Perfect"	2015	IRE, SCO, SLOV
Fleur East	"Sax"	2016	CRO, HUN
Fifth Harmony featuring Ty Dolla $ign	"Work from Home"	2016	NZ, NL, CRO
James Arthur	"Say You Won't Let Go"	2016	UK, SCO, IRE, AUS, EUR, SWE, NZ, NL, PHI
Little Mix	"Shout Out to My Ex"	2016	UK, SCO, IRE, EUR, PHI
Artists for Grenfell	"Bridge over Troubled Water"	2017	UK, SCO
Camila Cabello featuring Young Thug	"Havana"	2017	AUS, SCO, UK, IRL, CAN, ISR, SLO, LTV, CZ R, EUR (digital), HUN, US, ECU, FRA, GRE, MEX, PAR, PHI, POL,
Camila Cabello	"Never Be the Same"	2018	BEL, CRO
Little Mix feat. Nicki Minaj	"Woman Like Me"	2018	ISR
Dalton Harris feat. James Arthur	"The Power of Love"	2018	SCO
