= Bad Boys (Alexandra Burke song) =

2009 single by Alexandra Burke

Single by Alexandra Burke featuring Flo Rida

from the album Overcome
- B-side: "Dangerous"; "Hallelujah"
- Released: 12 October 2009
- Recorded: 2009
- Genre: Electro-R&B; pop
- Length: 3:26 (feat. Flo Rida); 3:10 (solo)
- Label: Syco
- Songwriters: Melvin K. Watson Jr; Larry Summerville Jr; Lauren Evans; Busbee; Alex James; Tramar Dillard
- Producer: The Phantom Boyz

Alexandra Burke singles chronology
"Hallelujah" (2008)	"Bad Boys" (2009)	"Broken Heels" (2010)

Flo Rida singles chronology
"Be on You" (2009)	"Bad Boys" (2009)

Music video
- "Bad Boys" on YouTube

"Bad Boys" is a song by British recording artist Alexandra Burke. The song is her second single after winning the fifth series of The X Factor, and the lead single from her debut album, Overcome. The song features American rapper Flo Rida. It was written by busbee, Lauren Evans, Alex James, and was produced by The Phantom Boyz. It was first released for digital download on 12 October 2009. The song is an uptempo electro-R&B song, lyrically about becoming attracted to dangerous men.

"Bad Boys" received positive reviews from critics, commending its production and composition as well as Burke's vocals. The song topped the charts in the United Kingdom and Ireland, the top ten of Sweden, the Netherlands, Hungary, Norway, Slovakia, the Czech Republic and Belgium (Wallonia) and the top twenty of several other countries. The song's accompanying music video takes place in an alleyway and a warehouse, and follows Burke's adventure when her convertible breaks down. The song has been performed a number of times, including on the sixth series of The X Factor.

== Background and composition ==
"Bad Boys"
A 30-second sample of "Bad Boys", featuring vocals by Alexandra Burke.

Burke premiered the song on 25 August 2009, on The Chris Moyles Show. Before its release, The Sun had leaked lyrics from the song online. In an interview with Popjustice when asked about the song, Burke said, "I've got a passion against liars, but I do like myself a bad boy. All young girls my age go for them, we just don't like to admit it, because we always go for them". The song is described as having a "stomping electro-R&B tune". The intro has been described as "a demented elasticated siren effect bouncing from speaker to speaker", which has been called a hybrid of Girls Aloud's "Biology", and Britney Spears' "Womanizer", but with a more "euphoric disco feel". According to Popjustice, the song is lyrically about "fancying dangerous men". Flo Rida appears in the intro and during the middle eight.

== Critical reception ==
The song received mostly positive reviews commending Burke's vocals and the production of the song. Matthew Chisling of Allmusic called the track "the most brilliant, perfect mainstream pop single of 2009", commending the song's synthesized beat and larger-than-life chorus, and Flo Rida's rap, stating that it made Burke "the prime UK import for the North American market". Popjustice called the song "brilliant" and "phenomenal", commending the song's "Womanizer"-like intro and the chorus's strong melodic topline. The review praised Burke's vocals, calling them "Whitneyish in parts" and compared them to Donna Summer. Although the review noted the song was not built for Burke's extreme vocals, it said, "that there's something quite exciting about an incredible singer being forced to follow a very strong and melodic topline instead of going all over the show." Bill Lamb of About.com also said the song was reminiscent of Donna Summer, and said, "Big international success seems a real possibility as Burke steps into the battle for R&B-pop diva crown." Nick Levine of Digital Spy said the song complimented Burke's "sass and all-around performance skill" rather than a ballad would, and called the song "fun", pulling off a "minor pop miracle- turning a cameo by Flo Rida into a good thing". Alexis Petrids of The Guardian noted although some may see the single as "generic", and "currently pop's factory-default setting", he ascertained the song was "a superior example of the type, furnished with an effortlessly unshakeable chorus". Although Harry Guerin of RTÉ noted the production and formula of the music was a flaw of the album, he noted that that technique worked in "Bad Boys". Simon Price of The Independent was more critical of the song, calling it a "pale imitation" of Britney Spears' "Womanizer".

== Chart performance ==
"Bad Boys" debuted at number one on the UK Singles Chart, replacing Chipmunk's "Oopsy Daisy", and becoming both Burke and Flo Rida's second chart-topper, selling over 187,000 copies in its first week, a total of 860,000 copies to date. The song also debuted on the Irish Singles Chart at number one. The song fell off the top spot in the second week, ceding the throne to Cheryl Cole's "Fight for This Love". It was certified platinum in the United Kingdom, and spent 25 consecutive weeks in the top seventy-five on the UK Singles Chart. The song also charted within the top ten of Sweden, the Netherlands, Hungary, Norway, Slovakia, the Czech Republic and Belgium (Wallonia). It charted within the top twenty of Finland, Belgium (Flanders), and Germany, twenty-two in Austria, and thirty-nine in Denmark. While the track failed to chart in Australia on the Singles Chart, it peaked at #11 on the Physical Singles Chart In the UK, 'Bad Boys' was the 18th biggest download of all time as of 2011.

== Music video ==
Burke enticing a group of men in the music video

The video was filmed from 31 August to 1 September 2009 in various locations in Los Angeles, directed by Bryan Barber. The clip starts with Alexandra dressed in a one-piece black leather suit, as her car has broken down in a bad part of town. It then cuts to Flo Rida who sings the opening lines of the song. Next, Burke performs various dance moves in deserted streets while being followed by several men. The video then shows Alexandra entering a bar in a mirrored silver dress, which has been compared to Janet Jackson around the janet. era, where she is mobbed by more of these men. She then performs more dance routines, before a fight ensues between the men in the bar over Alexandra and Flo Rida performs his part in the song. During his rap, there are scenes where Alexandra backflips off a bar table, and pushes two men powerfully over a bar and through a door. The video then shows Alexandra dancing with more men in a deserted parking lot.

David Whitehouse of Wonderland Magazine declared the "Bad Boys" video as "the birth of a pop star". After commenting that America generates better, glossier pop than the British, such as the "holy trinity of 21st century pop music", Christina Aguilera, Britney Spears, and Justin Timberlake, Whitehouse said that the video looked and sounded American, "dripping" with "dollar signs and expensive lenses". The review commending Burke's look in the video calling her, "the gutsier, sassier alternative to the anaemic, high school warbling of, say, Kelly Clarkson or the pre-pubescent offal piped into our children by Miley Cyrus." Whitehouse stated, "It has pomposity, big dance routines, cars built like tanks, moody street hunks (also built like tanks), stunts, jewellery and a rapper, Flo Rida, who in honesty, could have been anyone". He went on to say, "If we want to make a megastar, let the Americans do it for us. They make megastars. If Alexandra Burke is going to be the pop star we want her to be, she’s going the right way about it".

== Live performances and promotion ==
Burke performed Bad Boys on the sixth series of The X Factor's first week results show on 11 October 2009. Flo Rida joined Burke on stage. She then performed the on GMTV on 13 October 2009 at London's G-A-Y and at Wembley Arena on 17 October 2009. She also performed it on Ireland's Childline concert in Dublin. Burke also performed the song, as well as others from her while presenting the launch of the Viva Network in the UK and Ireland. She returned for the finale of the sixth series of The X Factor, where she and past runner-up JLS performed a melody of the song and their hit, "Everybody in Love". Burke also performed the song at The O2 Arena in London for the Jingle Bell Ball, while also appearing on Cheryl Cole's Night In to perform the solo version. "Bad Boys" was also the background music in Dancing on Ice during the first week when introducing the male celebrities. In week seven of the fifth season of Dancing on Ice, actress Emily Atack danced to the song and achieved her highest score at the time in the show. In the UK, Burke also performed it on Ant and Dec's Push The Button on 13 March 2010, and is set to perform it on T4 on the Beach on 4 July 2010. Burke also performed the song while promoting Overcome on her European Promo Tour. She performed "Bad Boys" live on the 20th Concert in Poland, on Queensday in the Netherlands at the Radio 538 Museumplein, and on the Dutch The X Factor.

== Track listing ==
UK & Australian Maxi CD

1. "Bad Boys" (Melvin K Watson Jr, Larry Summerville Jr, Busbee, Lauren Evans, Alex James)
2. "Dangerous" (Hitesh Ceon, Kim Ofstad, Andrea Martin)
3. "Bad Boys" (Moto Blanco Radio Mix)

UK iTunes digital download

1. "Bad Boys"
2. "Bad Boys" (Moto Blanco Extended Vocal Mix)

German 2-Track CD

1. "Bad Boys"
2. "Hallelujah" (Leonard Cohen)

German & Austrian iTunes EP

1. "Bad Boys"
2. "Bad Boys" (Solo Version)
3. "Hallelujah"
4. "Bad Boys" (Moto Blanco Extended Vocal Mix)
5. "Bad Boys" (Video)

Digital EP

1. "Bad Boys" (feat. Flo Rida) - 3:27
2. "Dangerous" - 3:10
3. "Bad Boys" (Solo Version) - 3:14
4. "Bad Boys" (Moto Blanco Radio Mix) - 3:23
5. "Bad Boys" (Moto Blanco Extended Vocal Mix) - 7"11
6. "Bad Boys" (Moto Blanco Dub) - 8:10

== Charts and certifications ==
=== Weekly charts ===
Chart (2009–2010)	Peak position
Australia Hitseekers (ARIA)	6
Australia Urban (ARIA)	25
Austria (Ö3 Austria Top 40)	22
Belgium (Ultratop 50 Flanders)	12
Belgium (Ultratip Bubbling Under Wallonia)	2
Czech Republic Airplay (ČNS IFPI)	3
Denmark (Tracklisten)	39
Europe (European Hot 100 Singles)	5
Finland (Suomen virallinen lista)	11
Germany (GfK)	14
Hungary (Rádiós Top 40)	4
Ireland (IRMA)	1
Netherlands (Dutch Top 40)	8
Netherlands (Single Top 100)	24
Norway (VG-lista)	7
Poland Dance (ZPAV)	27
Scotland Singles (OCC)	1
Slovakia Airplay (ČNS IFPI)	4
South Korea International (Gaon)	41
Sweden (Sverigetopplistan)	6
Switzerland (Schweizer Hitparade)	12
UK Singles (OCC)	1

=== Year-end charts ===
Chart (2009)	Position
Ireland (IRMA)	8
UK Singles (OCC)	9

Chart (2010)	Position
Belgium (Ultratop 50 Flanders)	85
Europe (European Hot 100 Singles)	84
Hungary (Rádiós Top 40)	40
Netherlands (Dutch Top 40)	45
Sweden (Sverigetopplistan)	85
UK Singles (OCC)	153

=== Decade-end charts ===
Chart (2000–2009)	Position
UK Singles (OCC)	68

=== Certifications ===
Region	Certification	Certified units/sales
Sweden (GLF)	2× Platinum	40,000^{‡}
United Kingdom (BPI)	Platinum	814,000
^{‡} Sales+streaming figures based on certification alone.

== Release history ==
Region	Date	Format	Label
United Kingdom	9 October 2009	Digital download	Syco Music
United Kingdom	12 October 2009	CD single	Syco Music
Czech Republic	28 October 2009	Airplay	Sony Music Entertainment
Slovakia	18 November 2009	Airplay	Sony Music Entertainment
Australia	8 January 2010	CD single	Sony Music Entertainment
Germany	22 January 2010	Digital download	Sony Music Entertainment
Germany	29 January 2010	CD single	Sony Music Entertainment
