= List of best-selling female music artists in the United Kingdom =

The following is a list of the best-selling female music artists in the United Kingdom, based solely on sales units published by reliable music industry-related organizations, including the British Phonographic Industry, the Official Charts Company, Music Week and Record Mirror.

== 30 million or more units ==
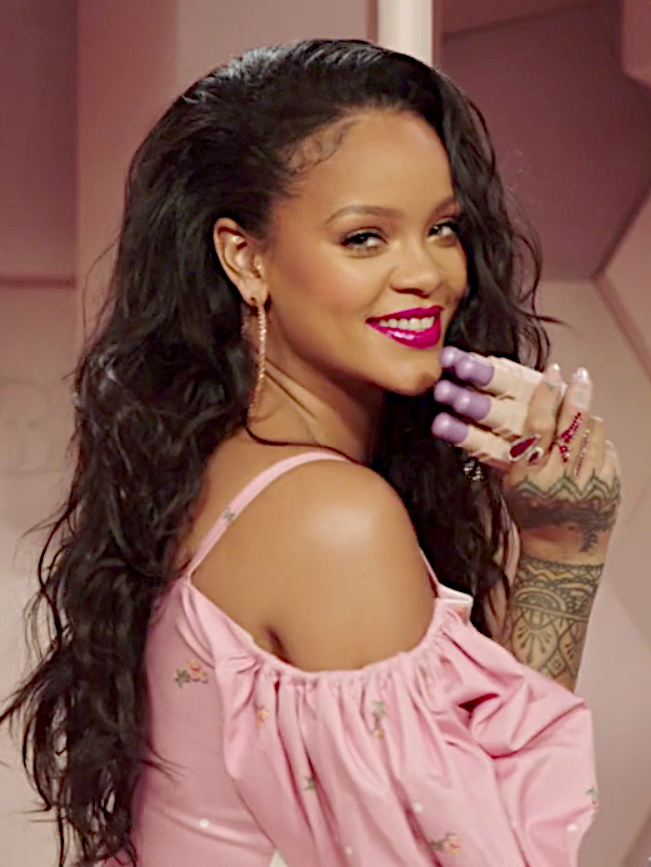
Rihanna

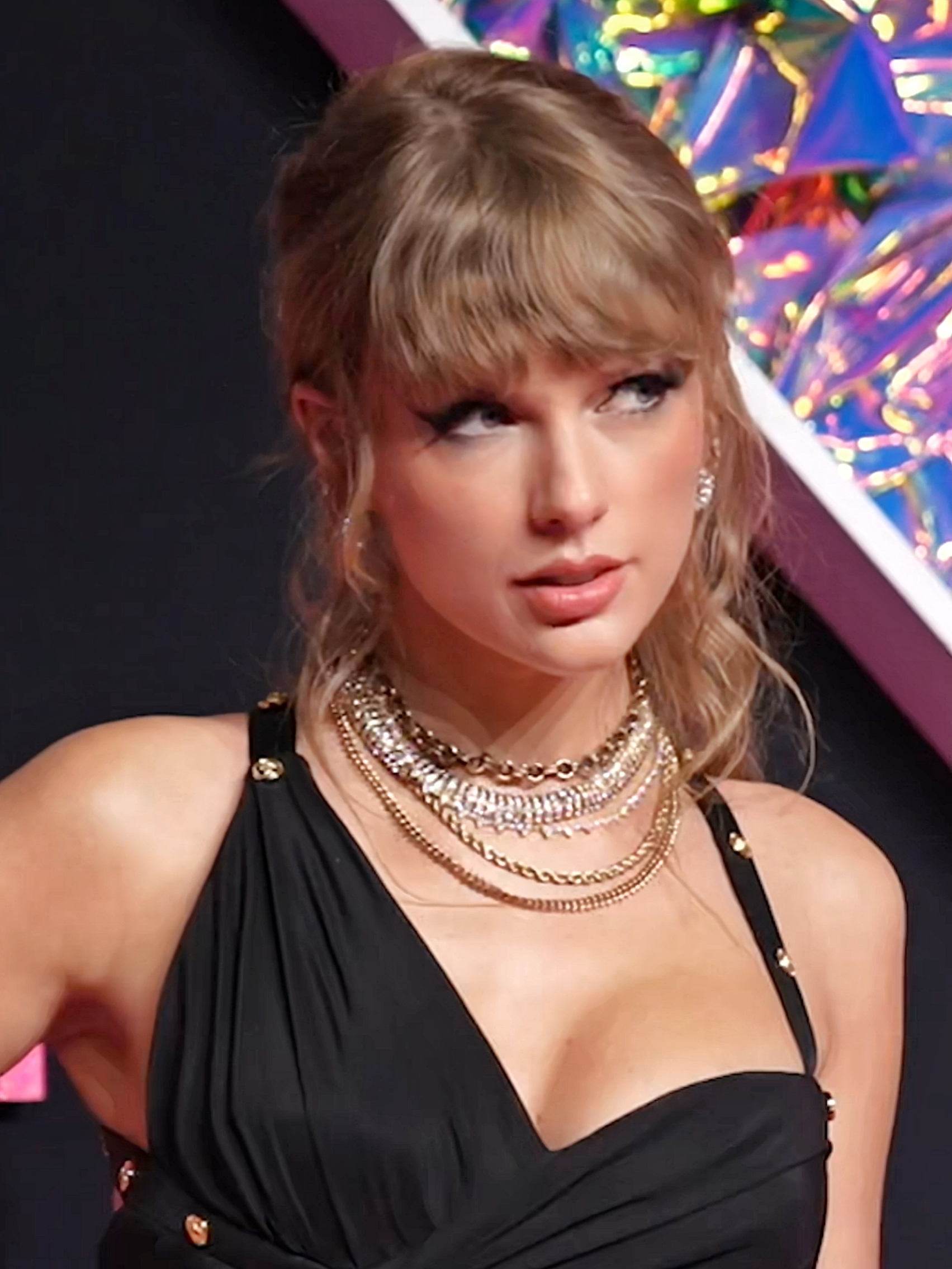
Taylor Swift

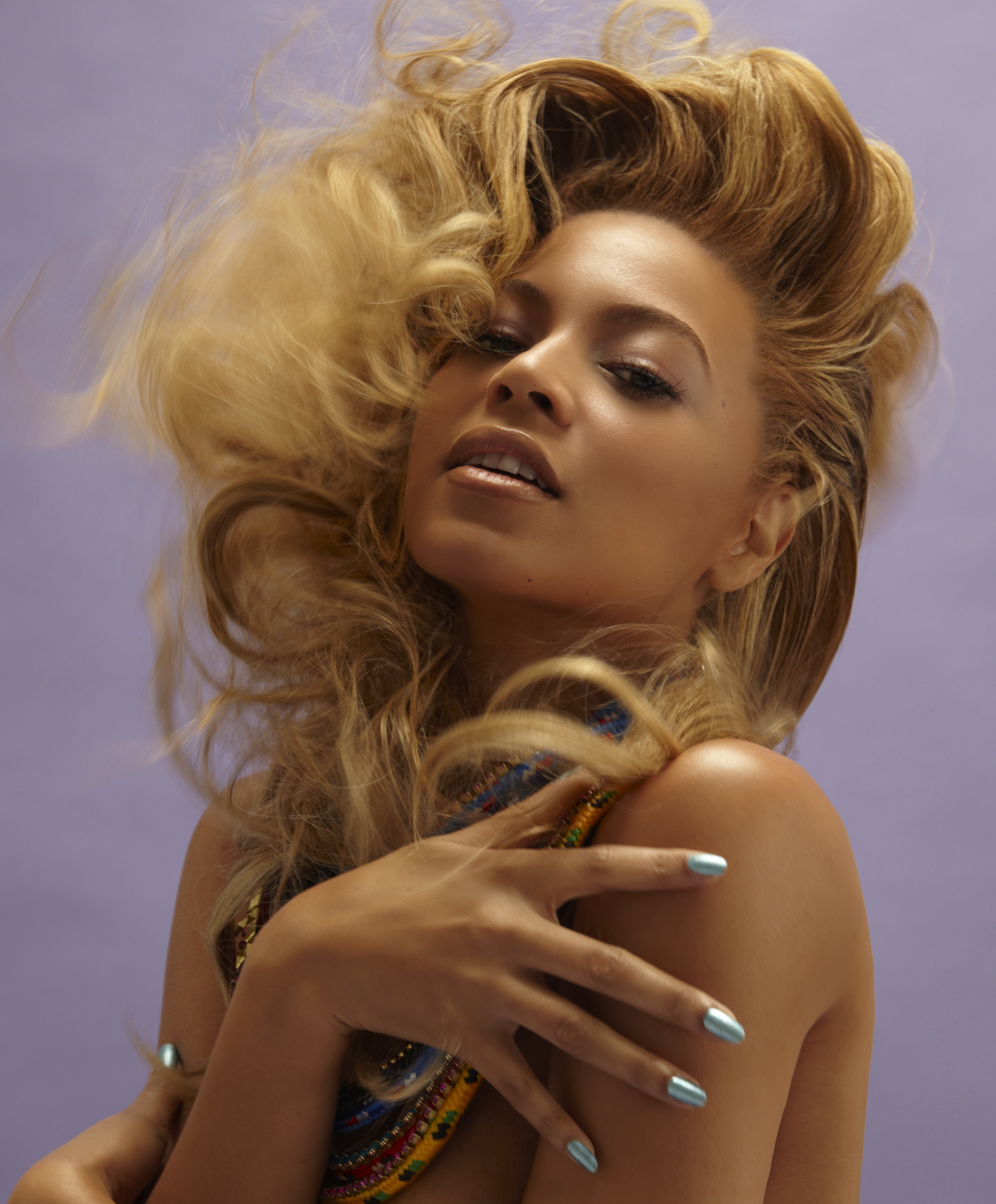
Beyoncé

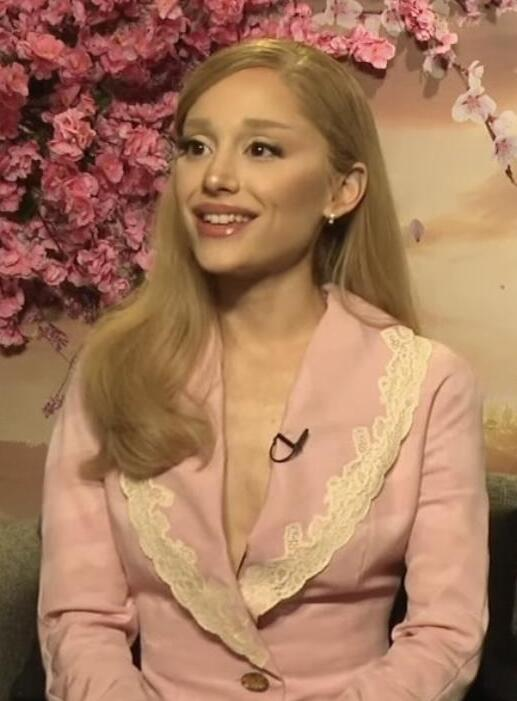
Ariana Grande

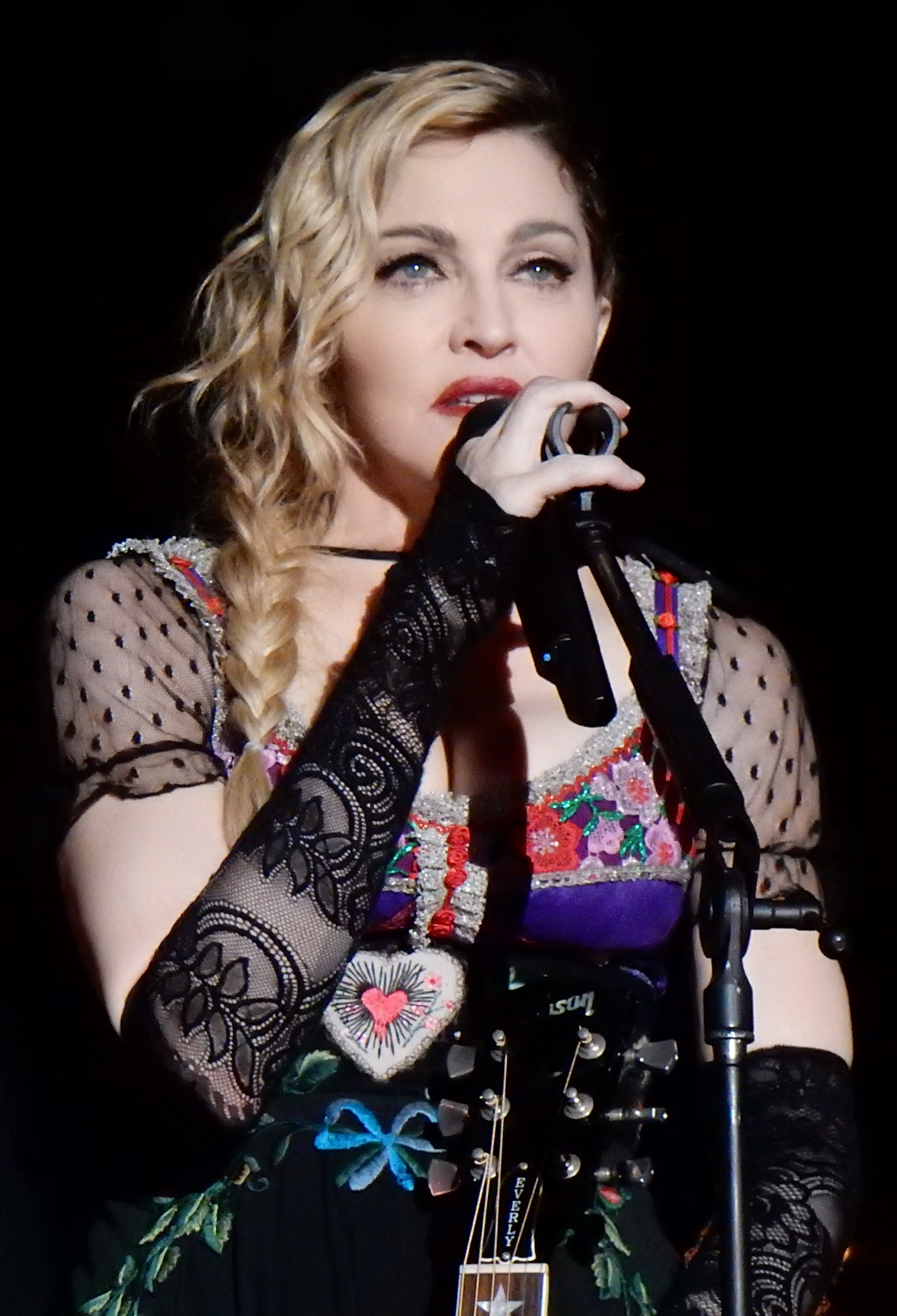
Madonna

| Artist | Country of origin | Period of activity | Genre(s) | Total certified units | Claimed sales |
|---|---|---|---|---|---|
| Rihanna | Barbados | 2005–present | Pop / R&B / Dance | 61.3 million | |
| Taylor Swift | United States | 2006–present | Pop / Country / Folk | 58.6 million | |
| Ariana Grande | United States | 2011–present | Pop / R&B | 43.60 million | |
| Adele | United Kingdom | 2008–present | Pop / soul | 40.7 million | |
| Beyoncé | United States | 1997–present | R&B / pop / dance | 39.53 million | |
| Madonna | United States | 1982–present | Pop / dance / electronic | 32.42 million | |
| Little Mix | United Kingdom | 2011–2022 | Pop / R&B / dance-pop | 30.00 million | |

== 20 million to 30 million units ==
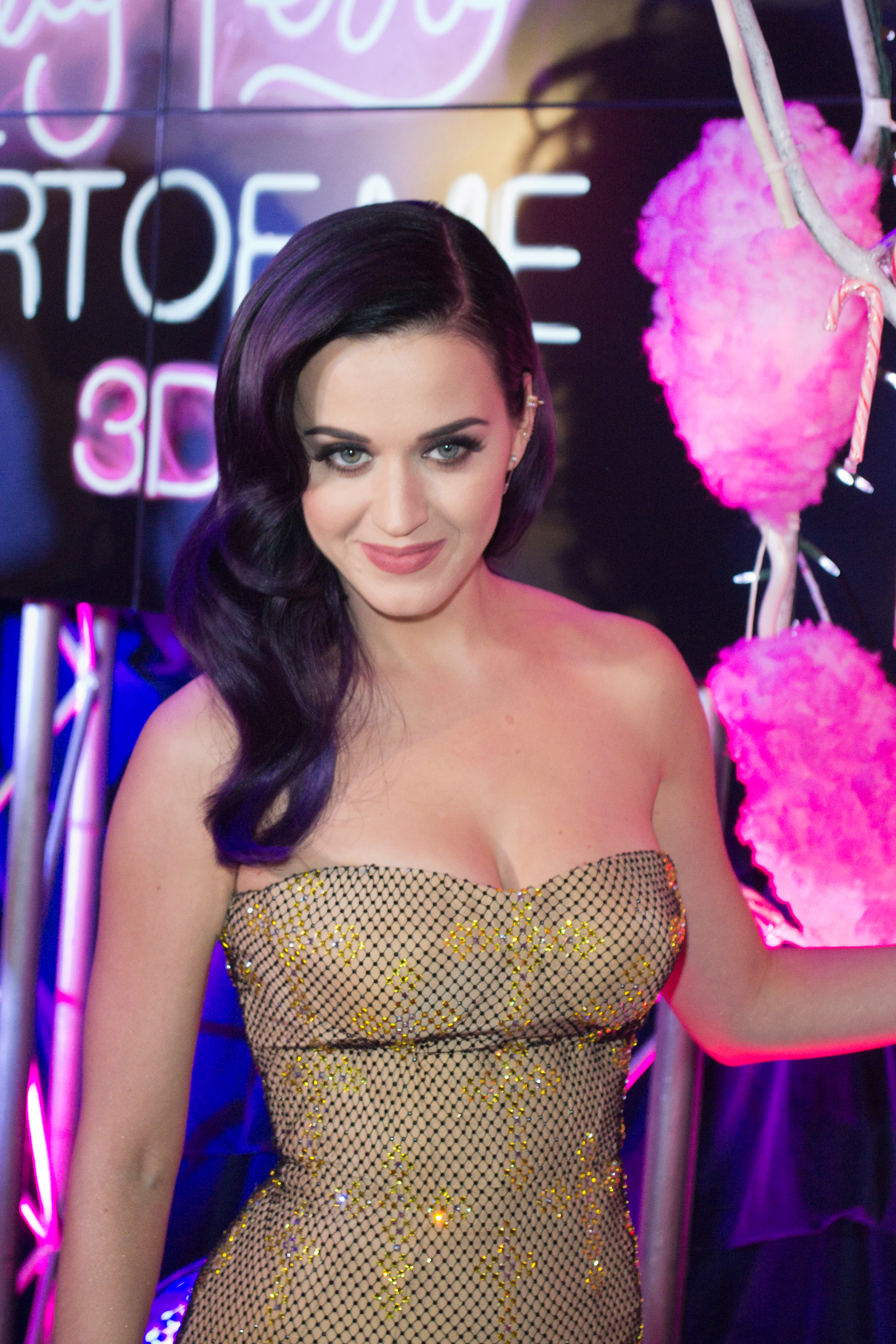
Katy Perry

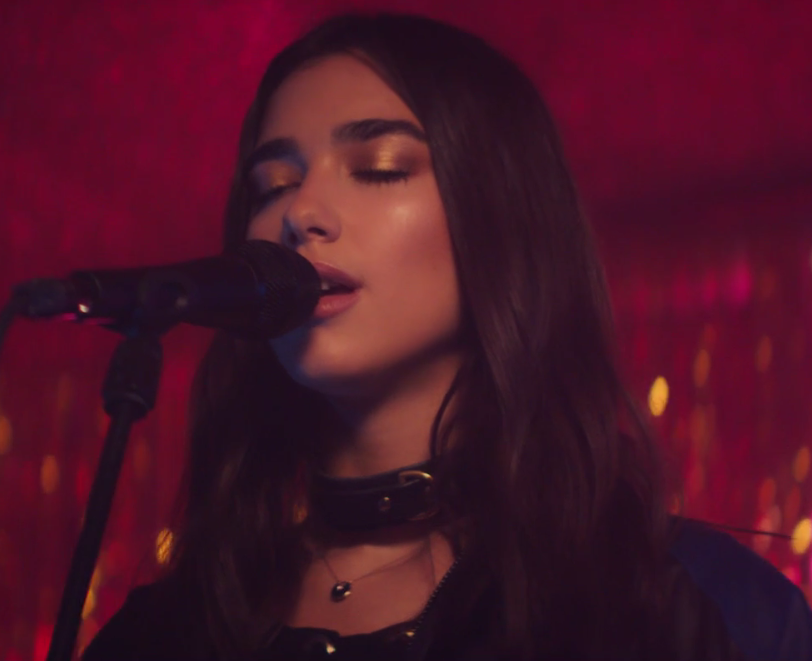
Dua Lipa

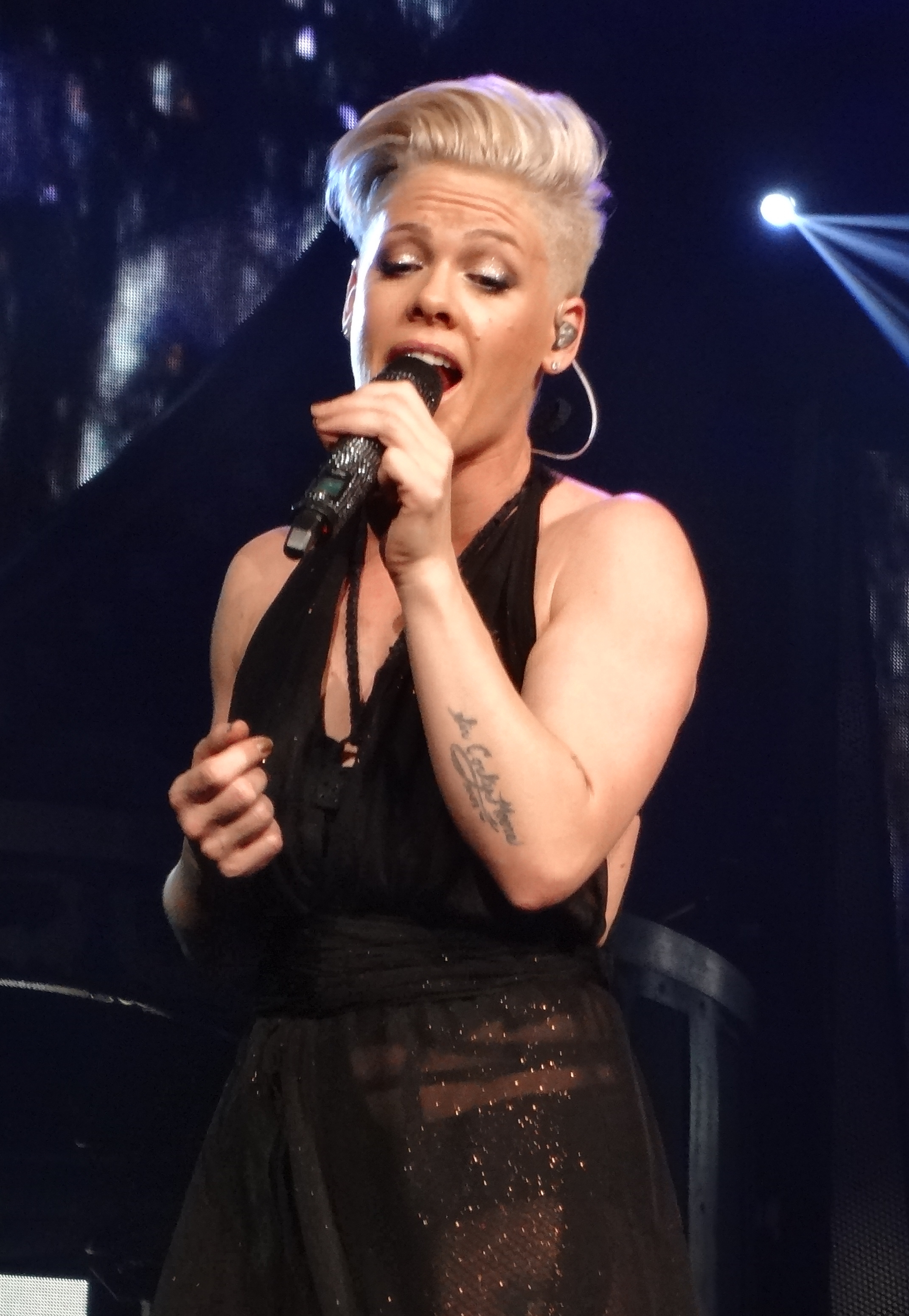
P!nk

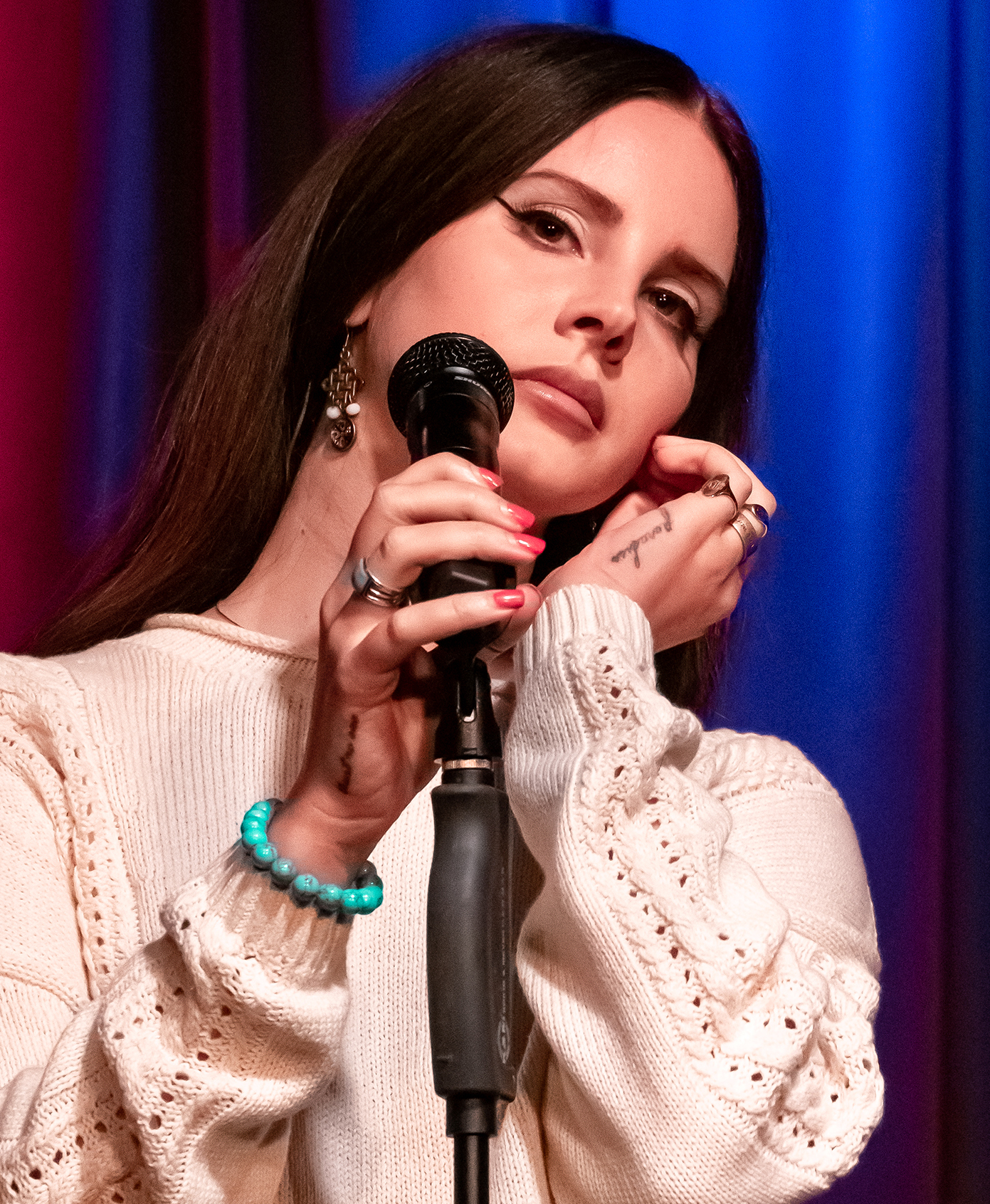
Lana Del Rey

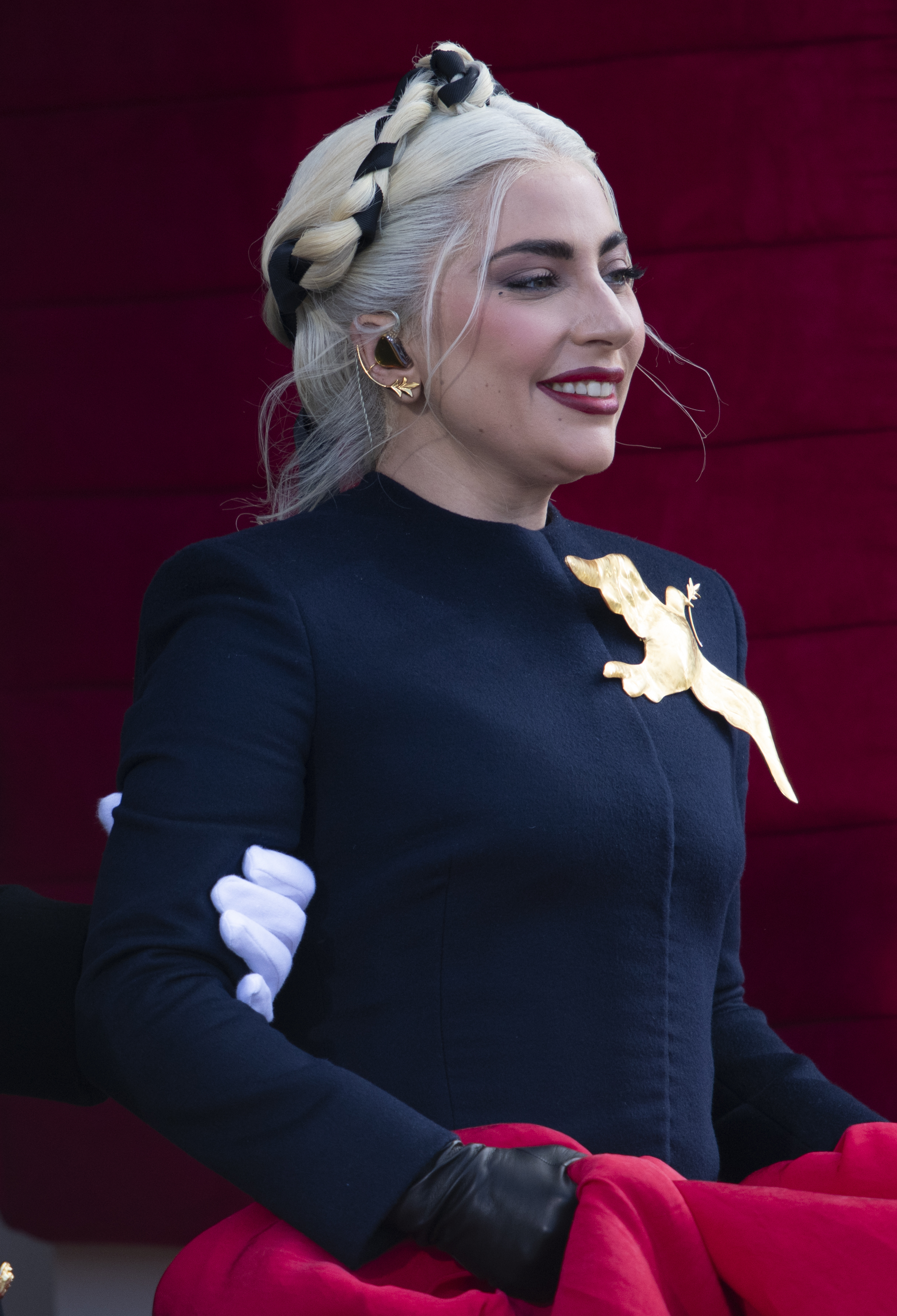
Lady Gaga

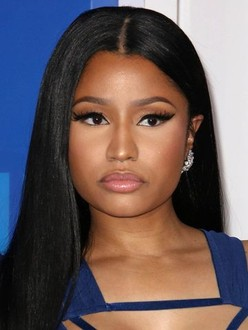
Nicki Minaj

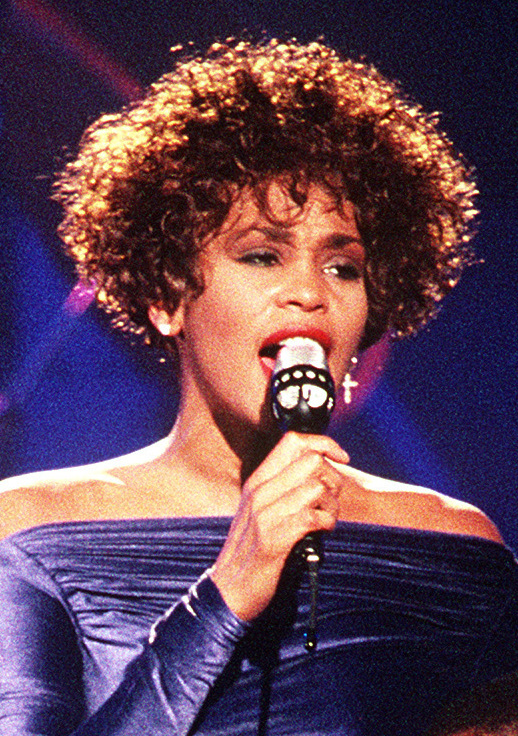
Whitney Houston

| Artist | Country of origin | Period of activity | Genre(s) | Total certified units | Claimed sales |
|---|---|---|---|---|---|
| Katy Perry | United States | 2001–present | Pop | 29.960 million | |
| Dua Lipa | United Kingdom | 2011–present | Pop / house / disco / R&B | 28.4 million | |
| P!nk | United States | 2000–present | Pop / pop rock / R&B | 26.5 million | |
| Whitney Houston | United States | 1984–2012 | R&B / pop / dance / soul / gospel | 25.945 million | |
| Lana Del Rey | United States | 2005–present | Alternative pop / baroque pop / rock / dream pop | 25.9 million | |
| Lady Gaga | United States | 2008–present | Pop / dance / electronic / jazz / pop rock | 25.36 million | |
| Nicki Minaj | Trinidad and Tobago | 2004–present | Hip-hop / pop | 24.26 million | |
| Olivia Rodrigo | United States | 2019–present | Pop / rock | 20.4 million | |
| Mariah Carey | United States | 1990–present | R&B / Pop | 20.36 million | |

== 10 million to 20 million units ==
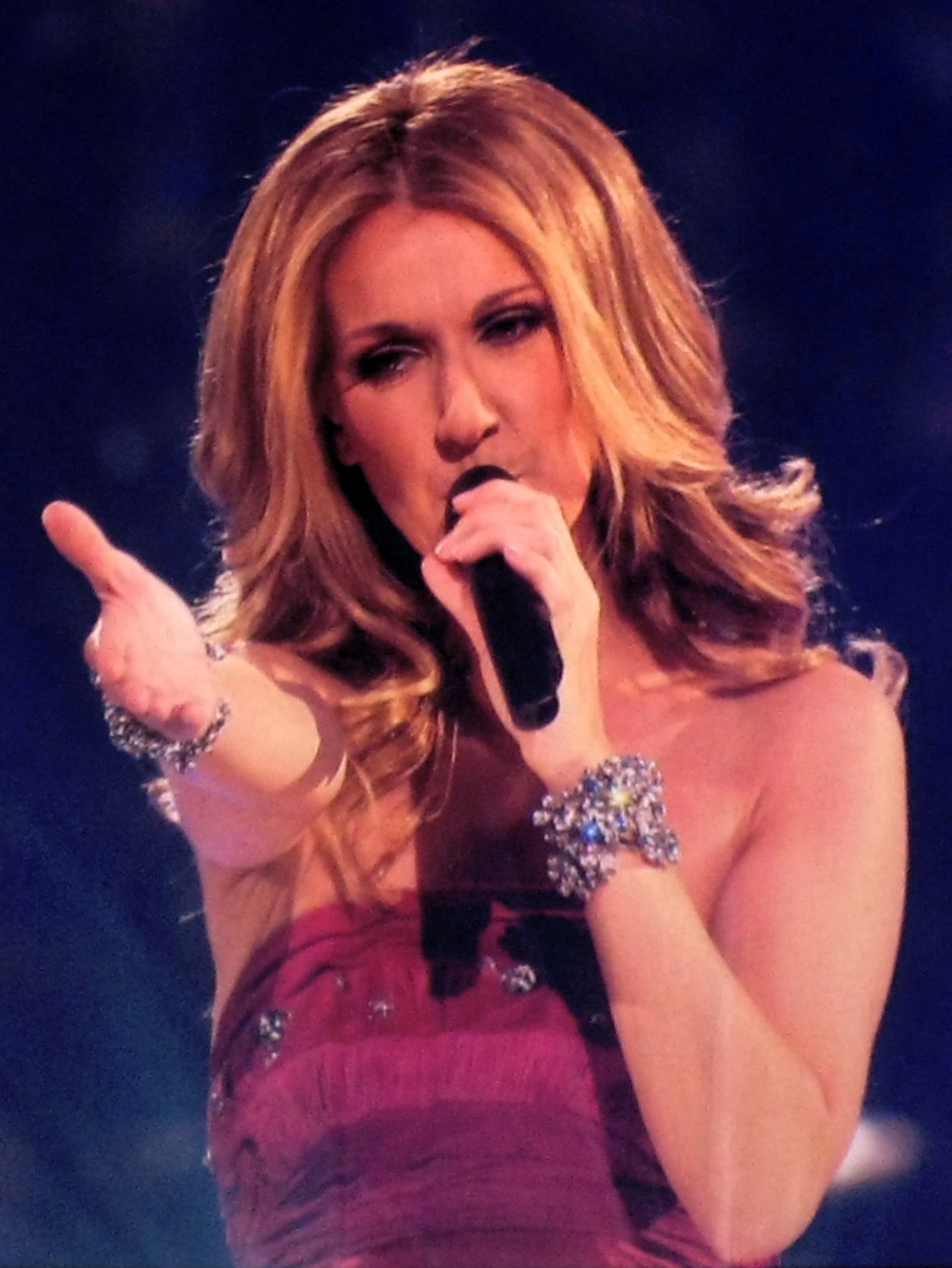
Celine Dion

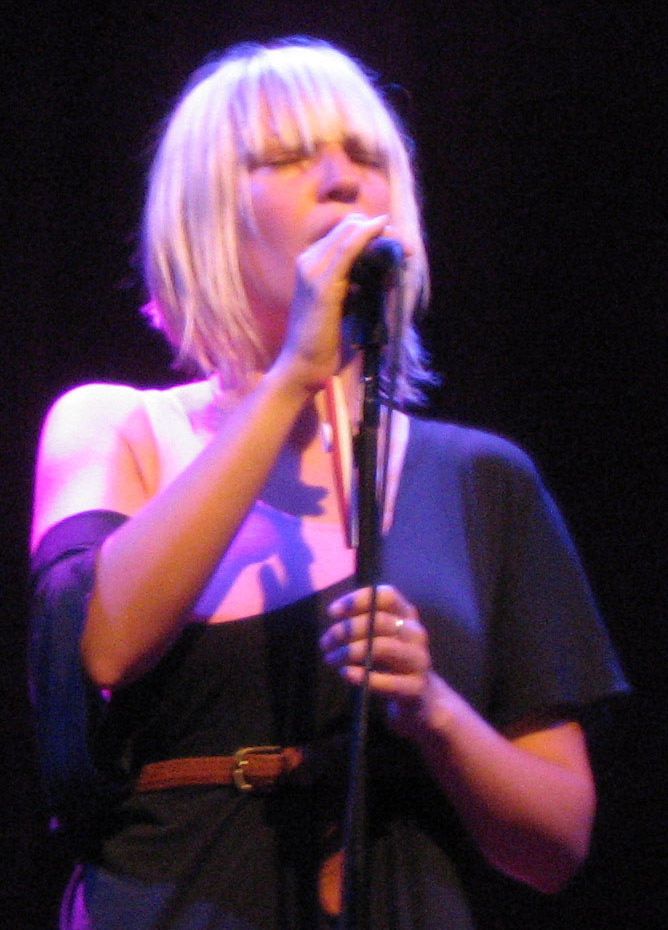
Sia

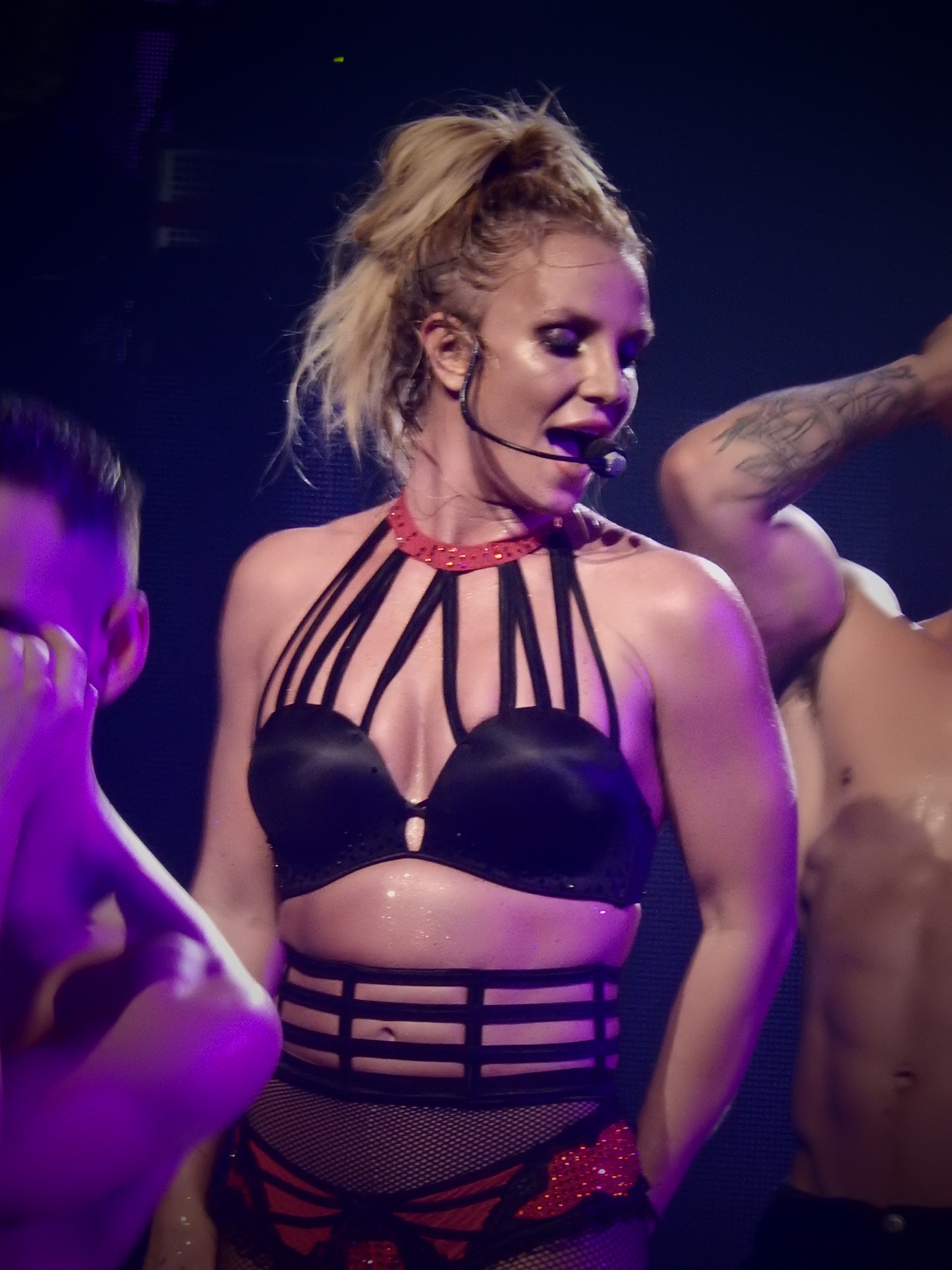
Britney Spears

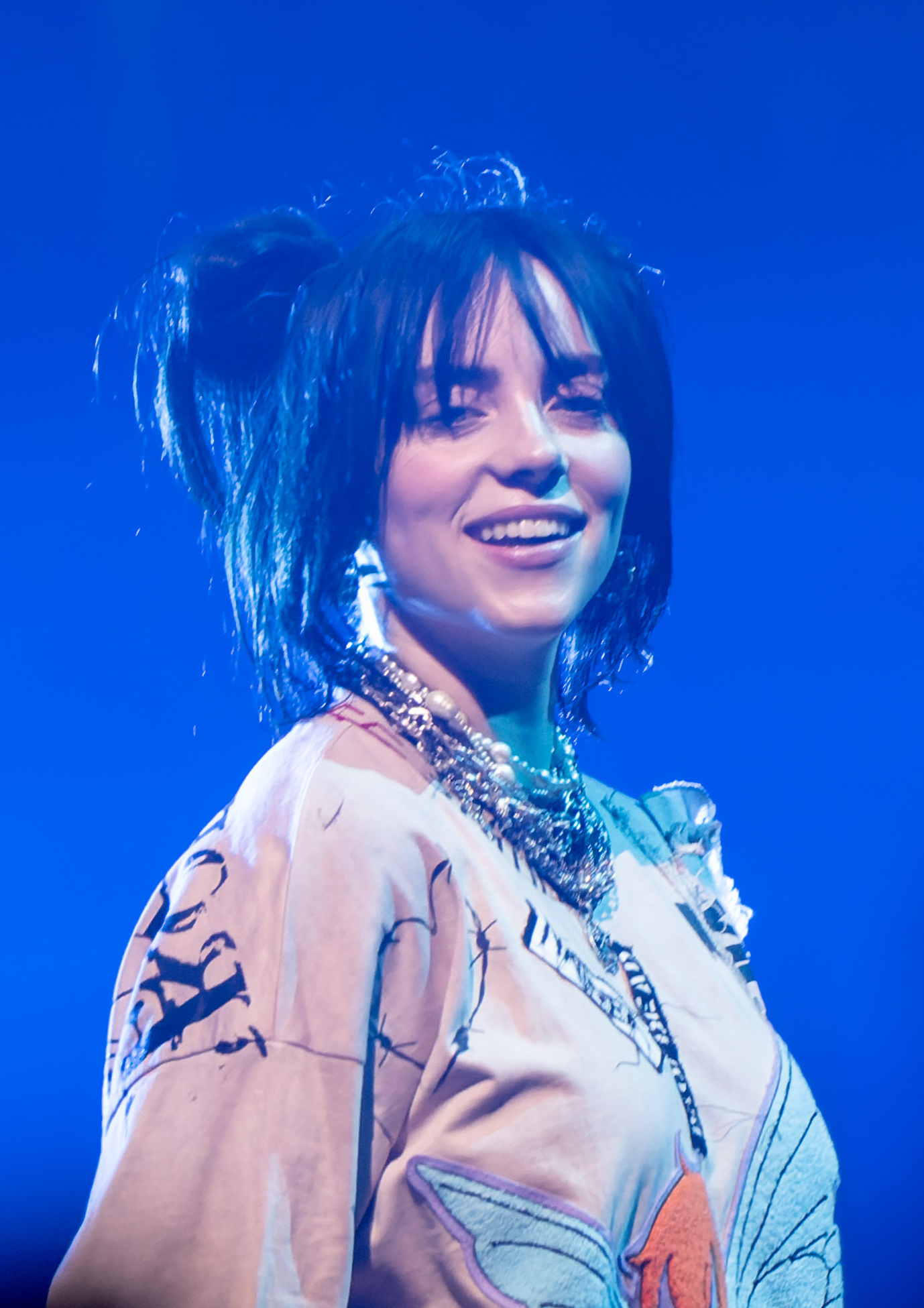
Billie Eilish

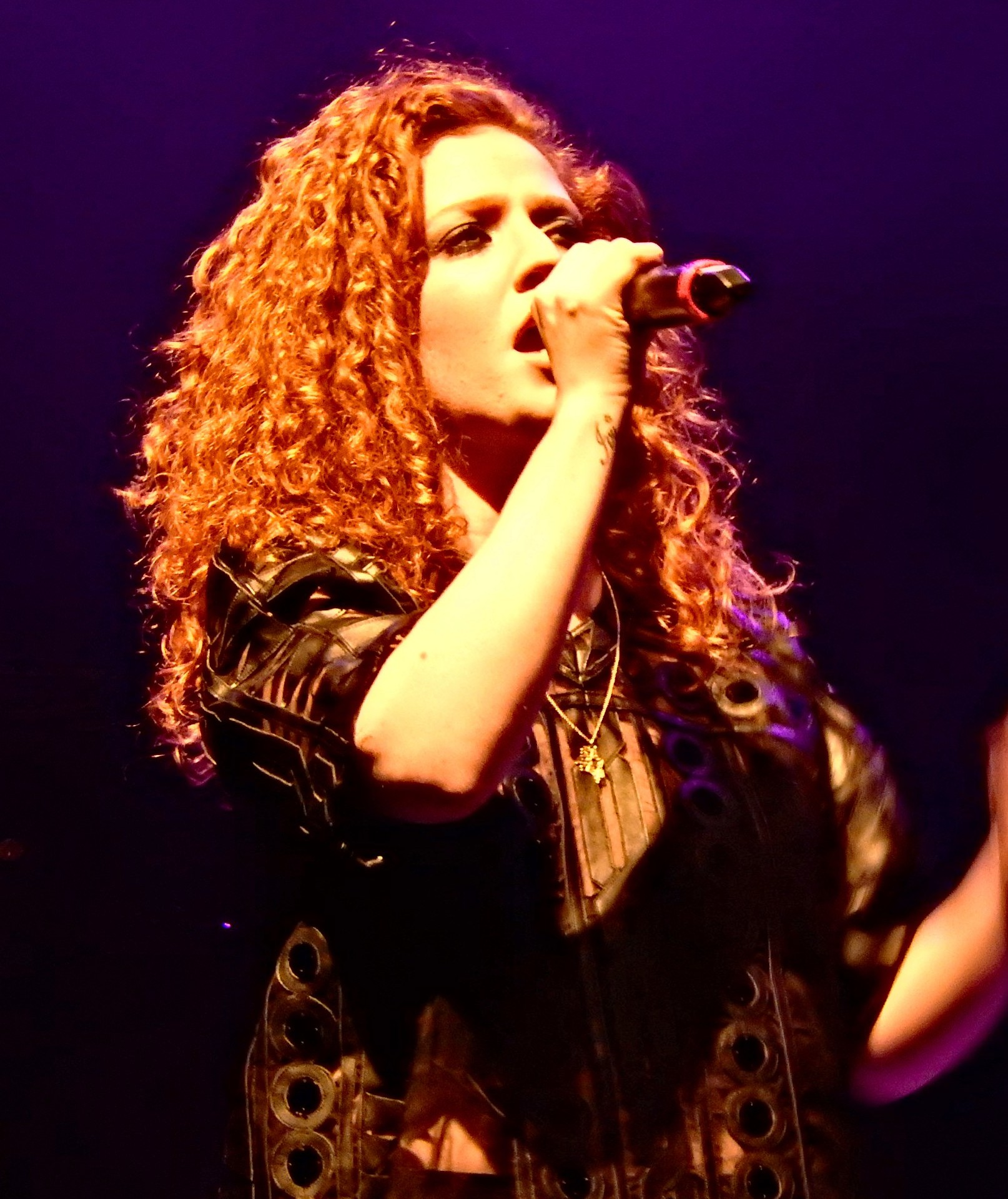
Jess Glynne

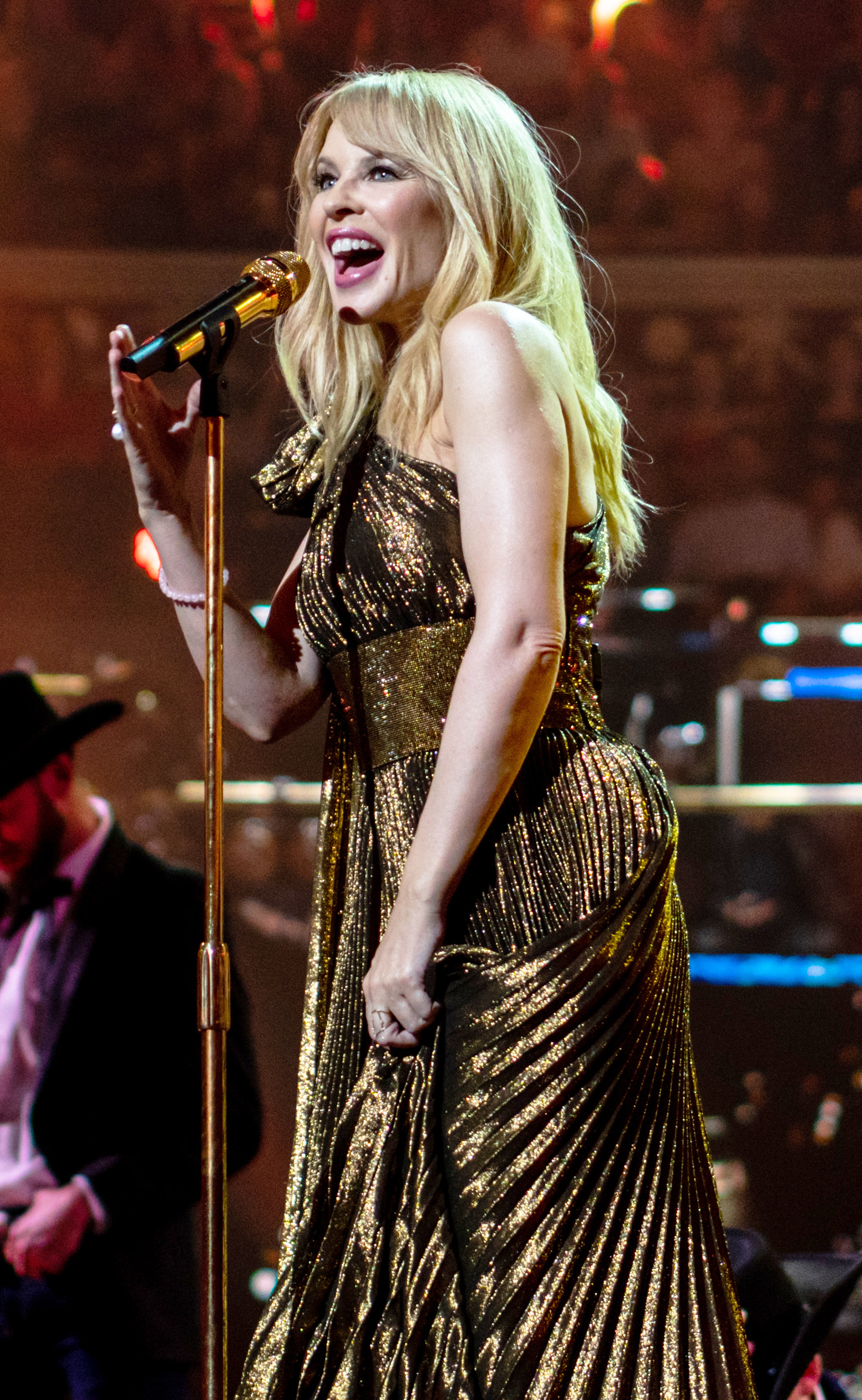
Kylie Minogue

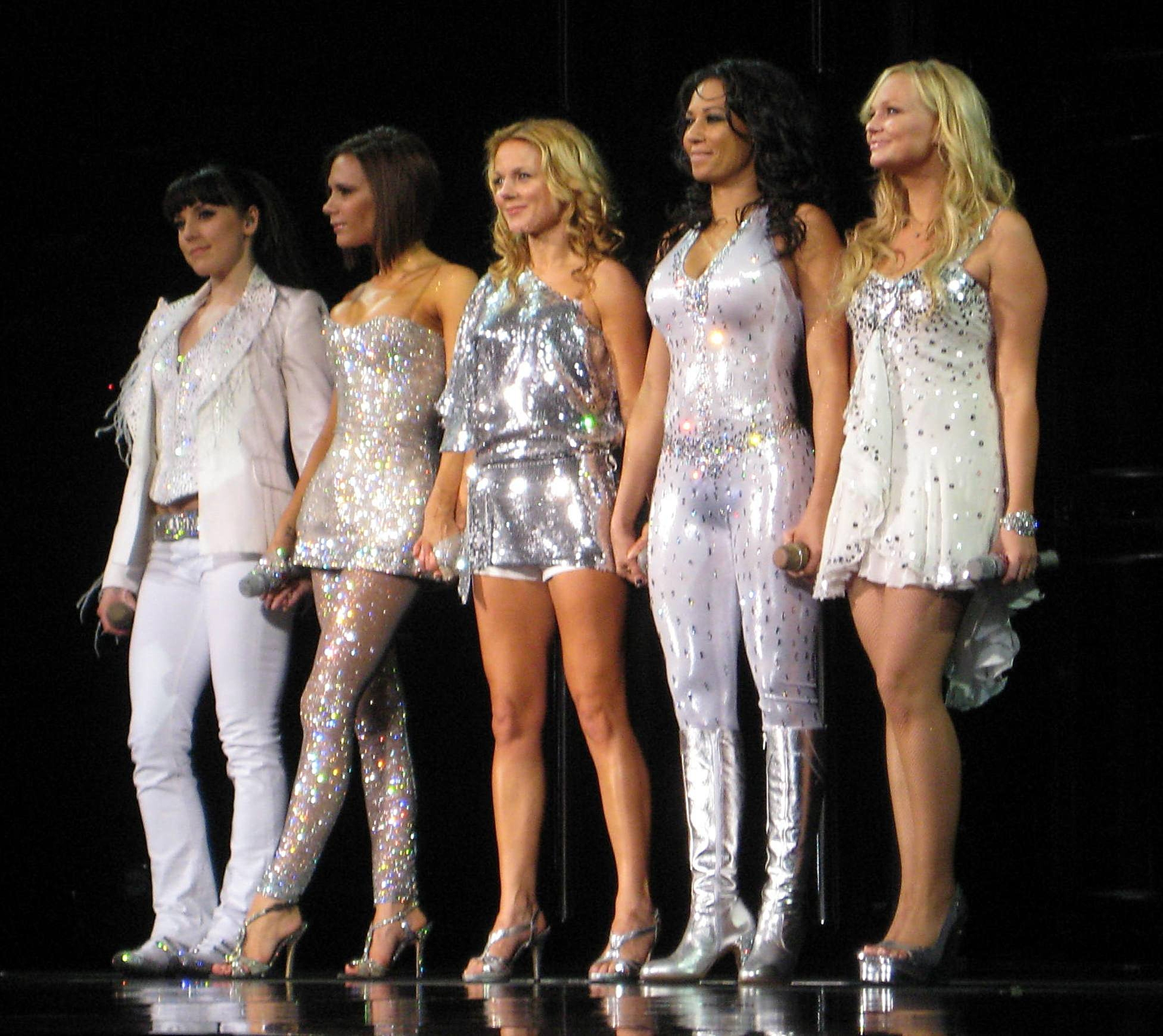
Spice Girls

| Artist | Country of origin | Period of activity | Genre(s) | Total certified units | Claimed sales |
|---|---|---|---|---|---|
| Celine Dion | Canada | 1981–present | Pop rock | 19.865 million | |
| Sia | Australia | 2013–present | Pop / electronica | 19.86 million | |
| Britney Spears | United States | 1998–present | Pop / dance / electronic | 18.885 million | |
| Billie Eilish | United States | 2015–present | Pop / alt-pop / electropop | 18.695 million | |
| Jess Glynne | United Kingdom | 2013–present | Pop / R&B / dance | 17.9 million | |
| Sabrina Carpenter | United States | 2015–present | Pop | 16.3 million | |
| Kylie Minogue | Australia | 1987–present | disco-pop | 15.61 million | |
| Spice Girls | United Kingdom | 1994–2000 / 2007–2008 / 2012 / 2016 / 2018–present | Pop / dance-pop | 15.55 million | |
| Ellie Goulding | United Kingdom | 2009–present | Electropop / synth-pop / indie / pop / folktronica | 14.7 million | |
| Christina Aguilera | United States | 1999–present | R&B / pop / rock | 13.21 million | |
| Miley Cyrus | United States | 2007–present | Pop | 13.02 million | |
| Amy Winehouse | United Kingdom | 2002–2011 | Soul / blue-eyed soul / neo soul / rhythm and blues / jazz | 12.61 million | |
| Rita Ora | United Kingdom | 2008–present | Pop / electropop / R&B | 12.6 million | |
| Becky Hill | United Kingdom | 2012–present | Pop / R&B | 12.2 million | |
| Shakira | Colombia | 1991-present | Latin pop / pop / pop rock | 11.90 million | |
| Cardi B | United States | 2015–present | Hip-hop | 11.7 million | |
| Camila Cabello | Cuba | 2012–present | Pop / Latin | 11.6 million | |
| Anne-Marie | United Kingdom | 2013–present | pop / grime / R&B | 11.2 million | |
| Zara Larsson | Sweden | 2008–present | Pop / dance-pop / electropop | 11.1 million | |
| Cher | United States | 1965–present | Pop / rock / dance / folk | 11.05 million | |
| Tina Turner | United States | 1964–2020 | Rock / Pop | 10.875 million | |
| Emeli Sandé | United Kingdom | 2008–present | R&B / soul / gospel | 10.725 million | |
| Destiny's Child | United States | 1990–2006 | R&B / Pop | 10.625 million | |
| Nelly Furtado | Canada | 1999–present | Pop / R&B / Latin | 10.6 million | |
| Halsey | United States | 2012–present | Pop / alternative pop / R&B | 10.5 million | |
| Kelly Clarkson | United States | 2002–present | Pop | 10.26 million | |

== 8 million to 10 million units ==
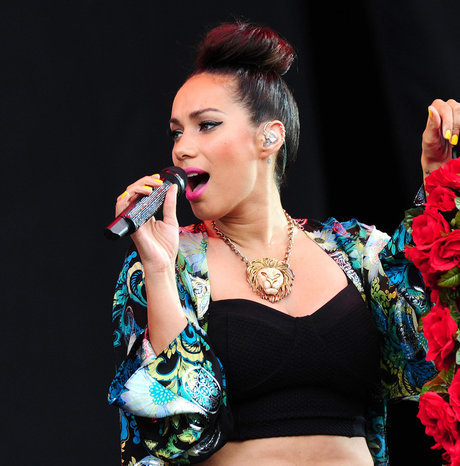
Leona Lewis

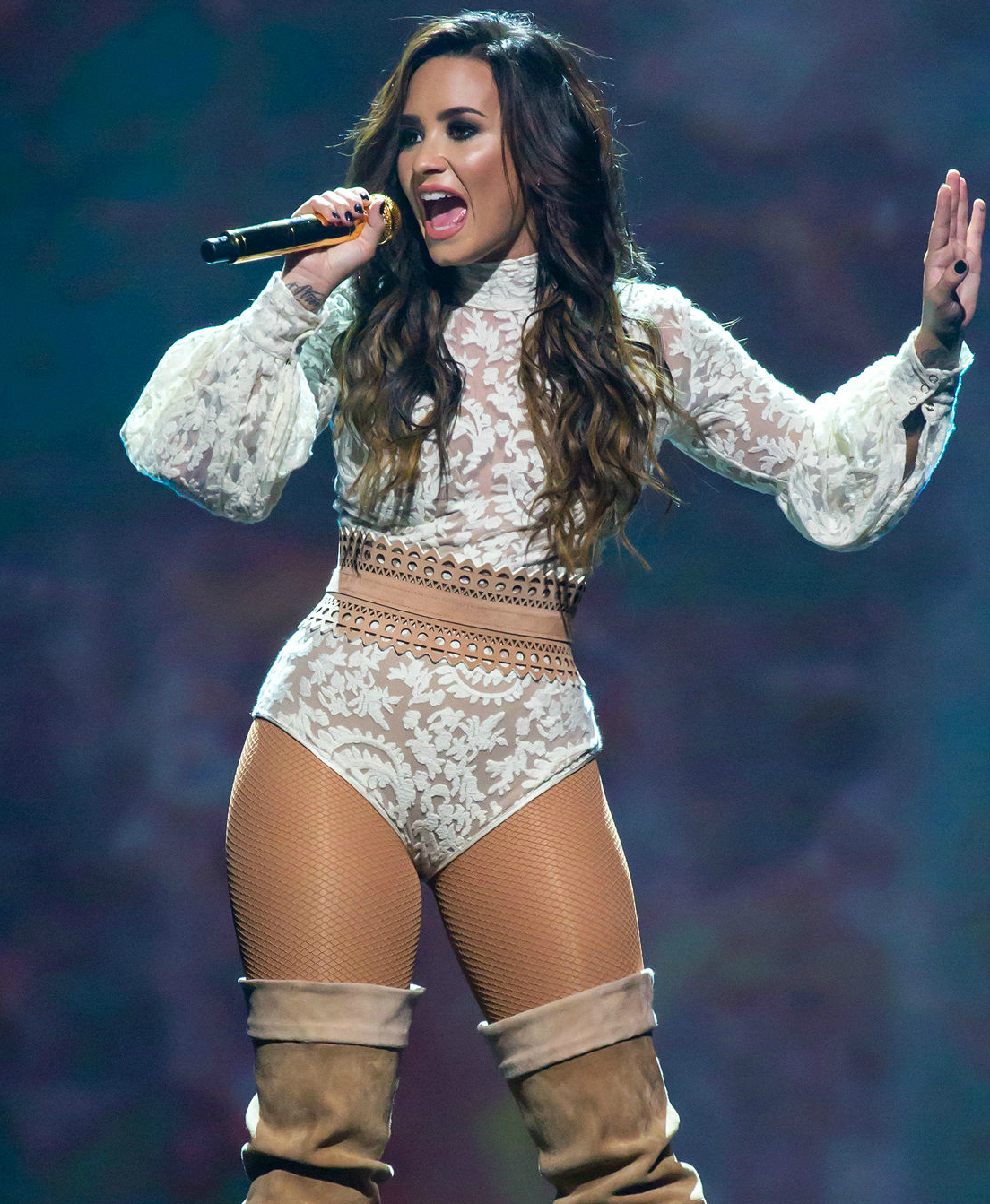
Demi Lovato

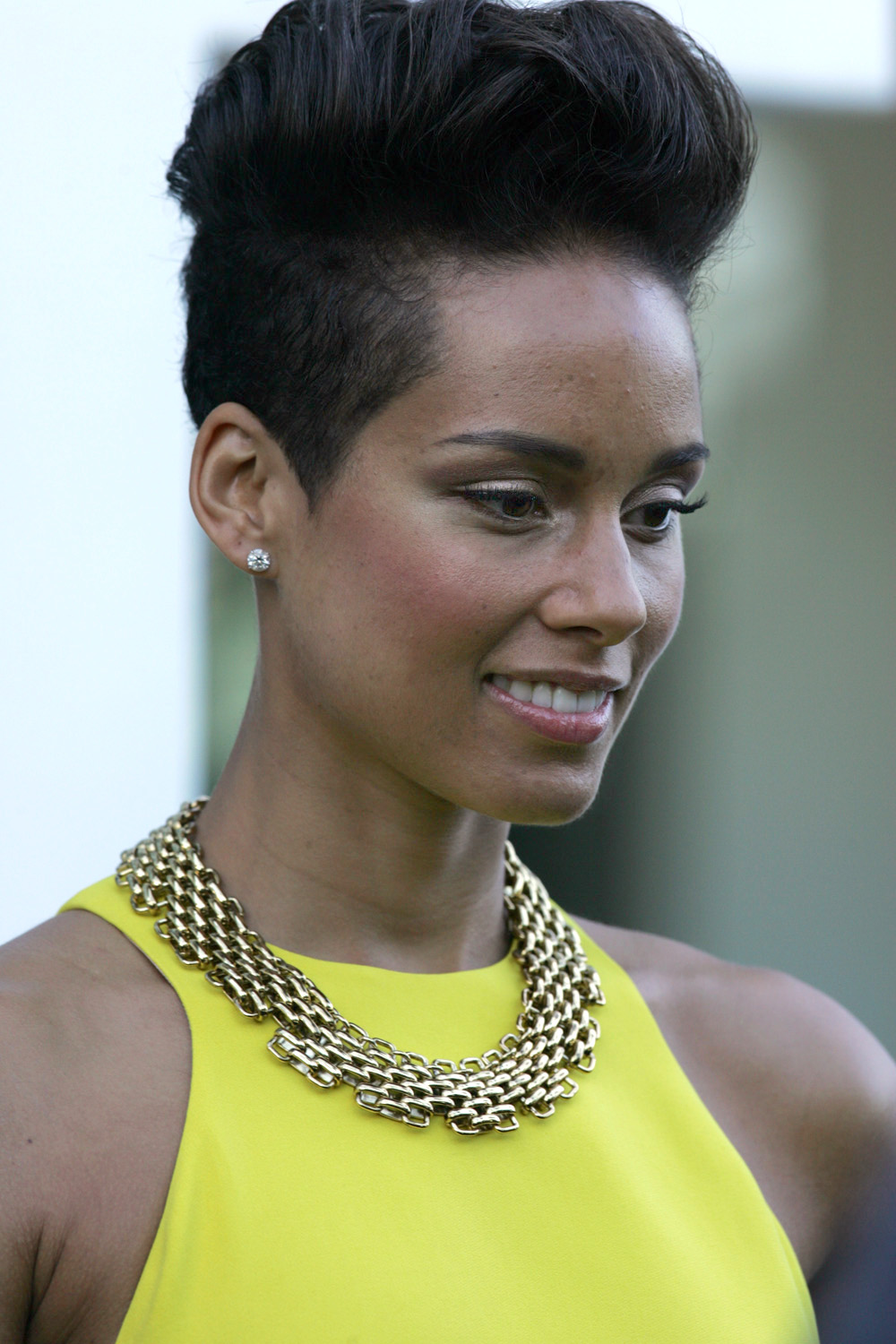
Alicia Keys

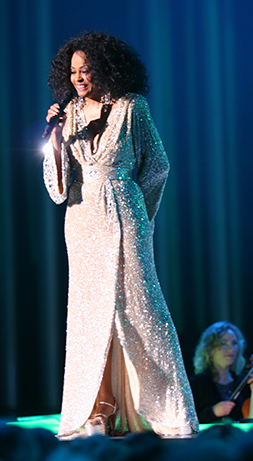
Diana Ross

| Artist | Country of origin | Period of activity | Genre(s) | Total certified units | Claimed sales |
|---|---|---|---|---|---|
| Leona Lewis | United Kingdom | 2006–present | R&B / Pop / soul | 9.56 million | |
| Demi Lovato | United States | 2002–present | Pop / pop rock / R&B | 9.26 million | |
| Alicia Keys | United States | 2001–present | Hip-hop / R&B / pop | 8.62 million | |
| Jessie J | United Kingdom | 2006–present | Pop / pop rock / R&B / soul | 8.36 million | |
| Kesha | United States | 2009–present | Pop / dance | 8.36 million | |
| Shania Twain | Canada | 1993–present | Country pop | 8.22 million | |
| Diana Ross (Note: Excludes all titles credited to The Supremes or Diana Ross & The Supremes) | United States | 1970–present | R&B / pop / disco | 8.02 million (Note: Diana Ross: 8.02 million) | |

== 1 million to 8 million units ==
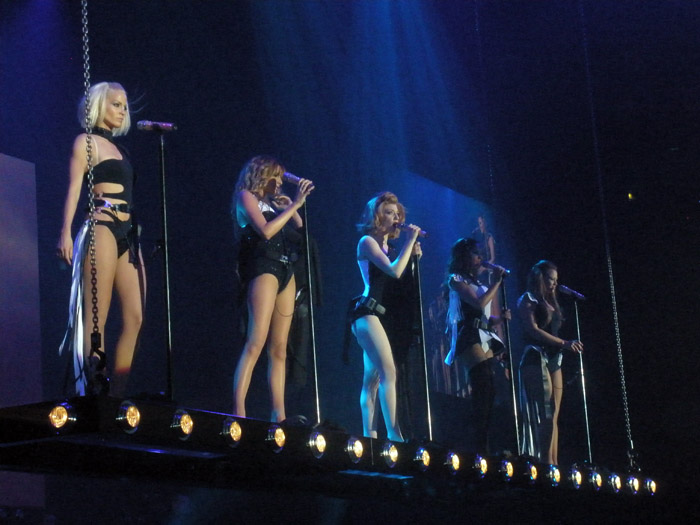
Girls Aloud

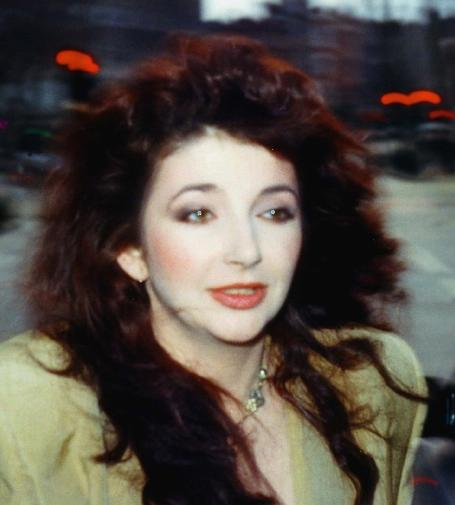
Kate Bush

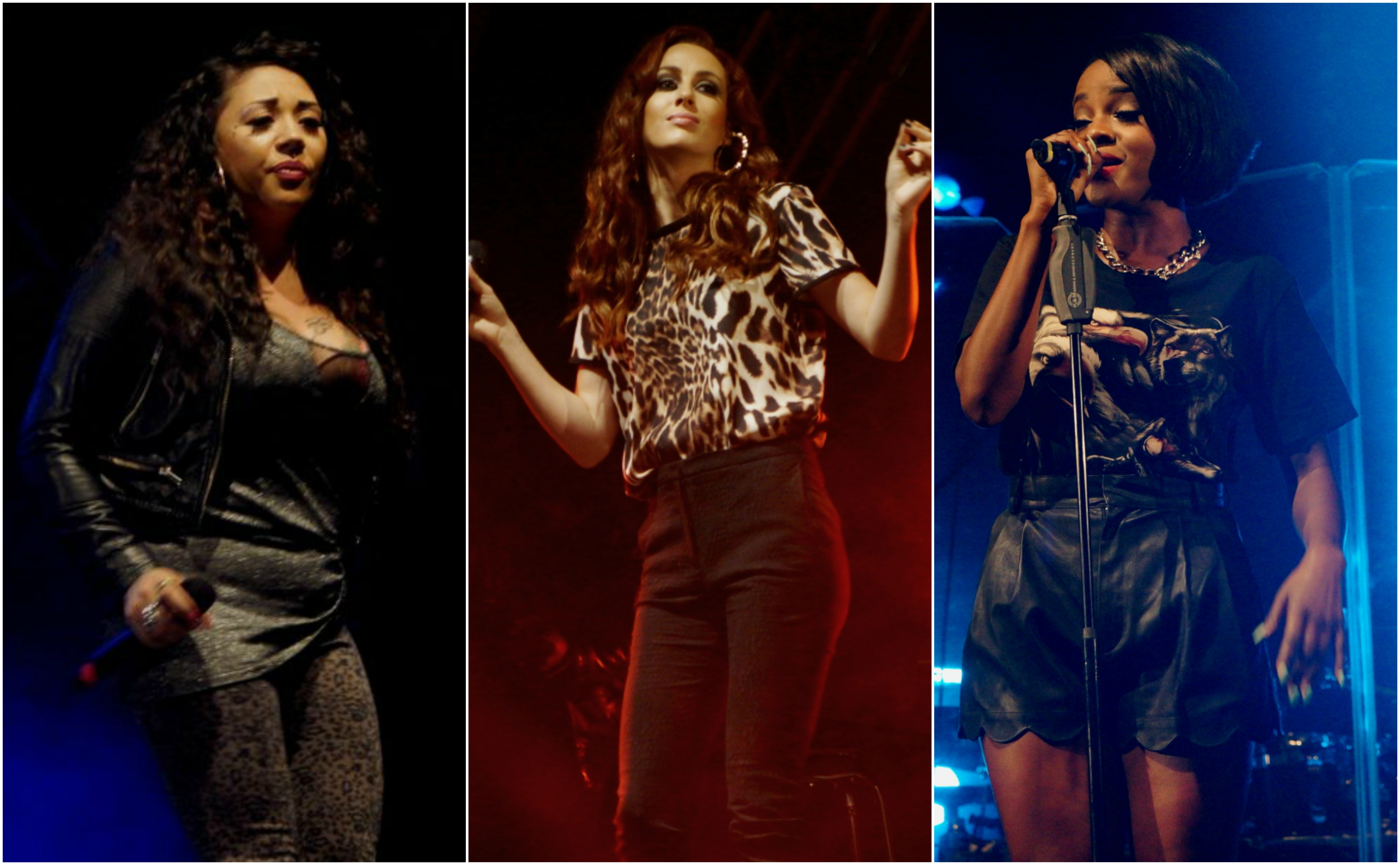
Sugababes

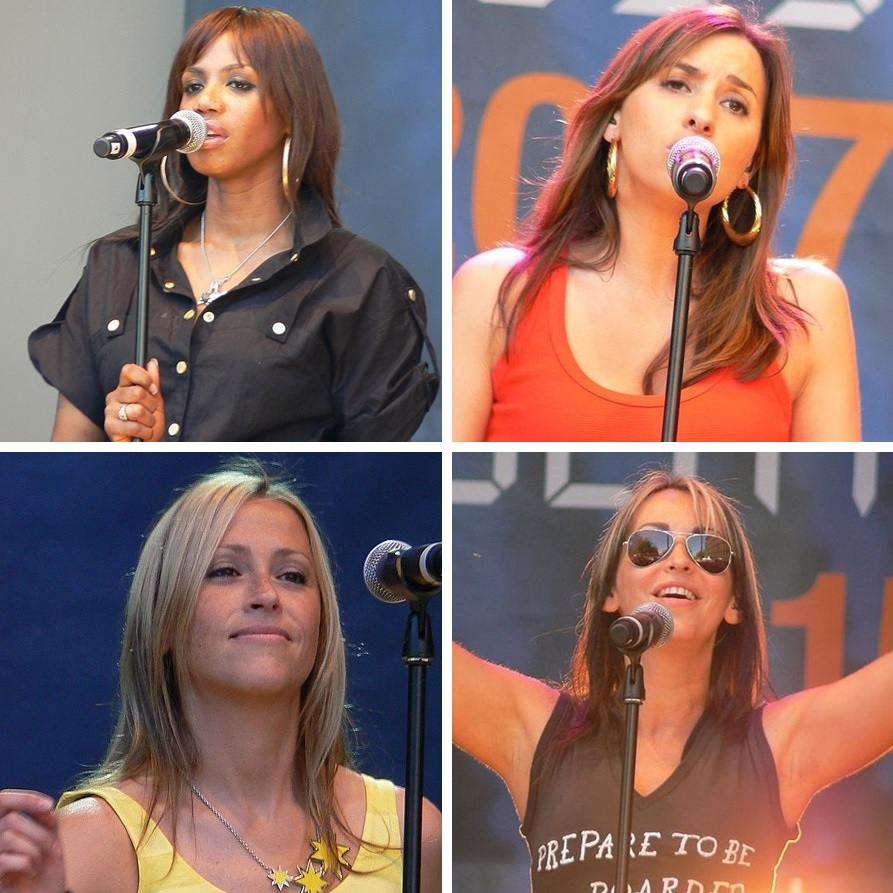
All Saints

| Artist | Country of origin | Period of activity | Genre(s) | Total certified units | Claimed sales |
|---|---|---|---|---|---|
| Girls Aloud | United Kingdom | 2002–2009 / 2012–2013 | Pop / electropop / dance-pop / dance-rock | 7.4 million | |
| Barbra Streisand | United States | 1963–present | Pop / rock / dance / showtunes / standards | 7.097 million | |
| Idina Menzel | United States | 1996–present | Soundtrack, pop | 7 million | |
| Avril Lavigne | Canada | 2002–present | Pop / rock | 6.885 million | |
| Enya | Ireland | 1980-present | New Age / Celtic pop | 6.8 million | |
| Kate Bush | United Kingdom | 1975–present | Art pop / progressive pop / experimental pop / art rock | 6.61 million | |
| Alanis Morissette | Canada | 1991–present | Pop / rock | 6.56 million | |
| Sugababes | United Kingdom | 1998–present | Pop / R&B | 6.56 million | |
| All Saints | United Kingdom | 1993–2001 / 2006–2008 / 2013–present | Pop / electronic / R&B | 5.8 million | |
| Christina Perri | United States | 2010–present | Pop / rock / children's | 5.7 million | |
| The Saturdays | United Kingdom | 2007–2014 | Pop / Dance / R&B | 5 million | |
| Janet Jackson | United States | 1982-present | R&B / pop / new jack swing / soul / dance | 4.88 million | |
| Kelly Rowland | United States | 1997–present | R&B / Pop / hip hop / soul / dance | 4.76 million | 5.211 million: Certified: 4.76 million; Uncertified songs: 451,000 units (Note: Reported chart sales for songs yet to meet certification threshold: "Down for Whatever": 177,000; "Motivation": 142,000; "What a Feeling": 132,000) |
| Eternal | United Kingdom | 1992–2000 / 2013–2014 | R&B / soul / gospel | 4.25 million | 4.38 million: Certified: 4.25 million; Uncertified songs: 130,000 units (Note: Reported chart sales for songs yet to meet certification threshold: "Someday": 130,000) |
| Kyla | United Kingdom | 2008–present | UK funky / house | 3.8 million | |
| Duffy | United Kingdom | 2004–2011 / 2015 | Soul / blue-eyed soul / pop | 3.4 million | |
| Missy Elliott | United States | 1991–present | Hip-hop / R&B / progressive rap | 3.32 million | |
| Alexandra Burke | United Kingdom | 2008–present | R&B / Pop / soul / dance | 3.2 million | 4-5 million Reported sales: 5 million; 4,083,812 units (Note: Includes certified units combined with reported sales. Most titles listed below have reported sales higher than current certifications: Overcome: 821,189; Heartbreak on Hold: 10,571; "Hallelujah": 1,339,000; "Bad Boys": 814,000; "Broken Heels": 400,000; "All Night Long": 314,000; "Start Without You": 305,000; "Elephant": 64,005; "Let it Go": 16,047) |
| TLC | United States | 1991–PRESENT | R&B / soul / gospel | 3.9 million | |
| Kelis | United States | 1997–present | R&B / pop / hip-hop / soul / electronica | 3.12 million | |
| Aretha Franklin | United States | 1954–2017 | R&B / soul / gospel | 3.06 million | |
| Mary J. Blige | United States | 1988–present | R&B / hip-hop / hip-hop soul | 3.02 million | |
| Toni Braxton | United States | 1989–present | R&B | 2.9 million | |
| Brandy | United States | 1994–present | R&B | 2.18 million | |
| The Supremes | United States | 1959–1977 | R&B / soul / pop / doo-wop / disco | 2.18 million | 3.418 million: Certified units: 2.18 million; 20 Golden Greats: 1 million (Note: Reported sales of 20 Golden Greats, as of 2020. The album was previously certified Platinum in 1977, when the thresholds were based on monetary revenue: Platinum (£1,000,000). However, this certification is not listed on the British Phonographic Industry website.); Uncertified albums: 30,000 (Note: Reported sales of albums yet to meet certification threshold: The Magnificent 7: 30,000); Uncertified songs: 208,000 (Note: Reported chart sales of songs yet to meet certification threshold: "Come See About Me": 65,000; "You Keep Me Hangin' On": 84,000; "Stoned Love": 59,000) |
| Nina Simone | United States | 1954–2002 | Classical / folk / gospel / blues /jazz /R&B / soul | 2.06 million | |
| Dusty Springfield | United Kingdom | 1958–1995 | Soul / blue-eyed soul / pop | 2.02 million | |
| Macy Gray | United States | 1990–present | R&B / soul / jazz | 1.96 million | |
| Shirley Bassey | United Kingdom | 1953–present | Pop | 1.6 million | |
| Jennifer Hudson | United States | 2004–present | R&B / soul | 1.5 million | |
| Dionne Warwick | United States | 1963–present | Pop / R&B / soul | 1.4 million | |
| Jamelia | United Kingdom | 1999—2007 | R&B / pop | 1.2 million | |
| Joan Armatrading | United Kingdom | 1972–present | Rock / pop / folk rock / blues | 1.14 million | |
| Robyn | Sweden | 1989–present | Electropop / synth-pop / dance-pop / R&B | 1.1 million | 1.502 million: 1,502,408 units (Note: Includes certified units combined with reported sales.: Robyn: 242,000; Body Talk Pt. 2: 3,602; Do It Again: 4,806; "Show Me Love": 113,000; "With Every Heartbeat": 491,000; "Dancing On My Own": 600,000; "Do it Again": 48,000) |
| Aaliyah | United States | 1989–2001 | R&B | 1 million | |

== See also ==
- List of best-selling music artists
- List of best-selling girl groups
- List of best-selling albums by women
- List of best-selling female rappers
- Women in music
