= Elephant (Alexandra Burke song) =

2012 single by Alexandra Burke

Single by Alexandra Burke featuring Erick Morillo

from the album Heartbreak on Hold
- Released: 9 March 2012
- Recorded: 2011
- Genre: Electro
- Length: 3:50
- Label: RCA; Syco; Sony
- Songwriters: Alexandra Burke; Britt Burton; Josh Wilkinson; Erick Morillo; Harry Romero; Jose Nuñez
- Producers: Erick Morillo; Mike Spencer; Sympho Nympho

Alexandra Burke singles chronology
"The Silence" (2010)	"Elephant" (2012)	"Let It Go" (2012)

Erick Morillo singles chronology
"Stronger" (2011)	"Elephant" (2012)

"Elephant" is a song by British singer Alexandra Burke from her second studio album Heartbreak on Hold (2012). It features Colombian-American DJ Erick Morillo, who co-wrote the song with Burke, Britt Burton, Josh Wilkinson, Harry Romero, and Jose Nuñez. The song was produced by Morillo, Romero and Nuñez under their stage name Sympho Nympho, and Mike Spencer. It was released in the United Kingdom on 11 March 2012 as the album's lead single. The song was released as Burke's debut single in the United States on 13 March 2012.

"Elephant" was met with mixed reviews from critics, some of whom criticised the song's production and the use of Auto-Tune. It debuted at number seven in Ireland and at number three in the UK, becoming Burke's sixth top 10 hit in both countries.

== Background ==
After Burke finished her concert tour called the All Night Long Tour (2011), in support of her debut studio album Overcome (2009), the singer revealed that she would be "getting down and dirty" and that her future music would be a lot more "fiercer and sexier". In January 2012, Burke revealed that "Elephant" was supposed to be played in nightclubs from December 2011, but it did not happen. The singer said that she wanted the remix to be played in nightclubs and bars by DJs first and then to release it to the public, however, the delay in club plays led to the release date being pushed back two weeks from the end of February 2012 to 11 March 2012. Burke revealed that it was a mutual decision between herself and RCA Records as she wanted everything to be "perfect." "Elephant" was co-written by Burke with Britt Burton, Emily Farrell, Josh Wilkinson, Erick Morillo, José Nunez and Harry Romero; Sympho Nympho and Mike Spencer produced the track. Although he is not credited in the album booklet, Burke confirmed that Morillo also produced the song. Burke's vocals were arranged, produced and recorded by Matt Schwartz. It was mixed by Spencer at The Larks Tongue, which is located in Buckinghamshire, England, while it was mastered by Dave Tuner at 360 Mastering. Programming was done by Mike Spencer, James David and Liz Horsman.

== Development ==
When asked about how the collaboration with DJ and producer Erick Morillo came to be, Burke revealed that he had heard the remix of "Elephant" and stated that he "wanted to get on board." After Burke returned from a writing camp in the United States, her record label and management contacted Morillo and asked him if he would like to be involved with the song, to which he said yes within 24 hours. Burke revealed that she could not believe that he accepted their request and she described the process as "cool." As a result of Morillo becoming involved with the project, the song went through a series of delays because of the opportunity to release the lead single as a collaboration. Burke revealed that she explored other options for the lead single as a result of the delays, but she knew that she wanted "Elephant" to be released first since July 2011.

== Composition and lyrics ==
Burke revealed that both musically and lyrically, "Elephant" is "very different" to the rest of the songs on Heartbreak on Hold. It is a 90s and club music-inspired song. In an interview with Digital Spy, the singer explained the meaning of the lyrics, saying "everyone has been through something in relationships; whether it be with a loved one, a partner or family members where something needs to be discussed - and I've been through that situation. I thought why not, let's do a song about it – but with a twist!" In an interview with ITV's Daybreak, Burke revealed that she had been unaware of the phrase "elephant in the room" before hearing it at a writing camp in the United States. She described the saying as "very, very American", in spite of it being a very well known phrase in the UK, and confidently stated that she was “the first person to bring it over here”.

== Critical reception ==
Lewis Corner of Digital Spy gave the song three out of five stars writing, "Like all good starters, the intro is a perfectly-sized portion of thumping beats and slick synths that leads into an even tastier main course. "You wanna talk, you wanna talk about it?/ There's an elephant in the room," Alex admits before a '90s handbag house chorus courtesy of Erick Morillo ensues. However, the overall flavour is marred by an over-seasoning of Auto-Tune; and the final breakdown? Well, it's about as satisfying as a dessert that doesn't get served." Clemmie Moodie of the Daily Mirror called the song a "bang-on hit." In his review for The Guardian, Michael Cragg criticized the use of Auto-Tune and wrote, "While the verses rattle along over stop-start synths, the heavily distorted pre-chorus crashes like an anvil, not only breaking up momentum but also bringing to mind a group of "revellers" stopping to burst into laughter." Mark Molloy of Metro called the song's production "stuck in a 90s time warp" writing, "Worse than the predictable thumping beats, slick synths and Burke's auto-tuned vocals is the laughable chorus drop which has minimal impact. When the final breakdown hits, you'll be smiling that the whole ordeal is coming to an end."

== Chart performance ==
"Elephant" debuted at number seven in Ireland on 16 March 2012, becoming Burke's sixth top 10 hit in the country. In the United Kingdom, the song debuted at number three on the UK Singles Chart with first-week sales of 42,387. It is her sixth top 10 hit in the UK. The following week the song fell to number twelve, selling 21,618 copies. The song debuted at number two in Scotland, becoming her seventh consecutive top 10 single in that territory. In June 2012, "Elephant" reached Number 9 in Bolivia and Number 71 in Slovenia.

== Music video ==
The music video was premiered on Vevo on 6 February 2012. Directed by Amit and Naroop, the video features Burke partying in a deserted warehouse, as well as performing a choreographed dance routine. The visual ends with the performer's boyfriend crashing the party to talk about the proverbial elephant in the room, which is the main focus of the song. Burke's sister, Sheniece and director, Jay Revell, who plays Burke's boyfriend, make cameo appearances in the video. The directors admitted that they "really wanted to create something different," during the shoot, adding, "I felt it was a little unexpected and people [can] see Alexandra Burke and think this is a new side of her." Burke has also said that "The concept of the video is really me showing my ex-boyfriend what he's missing, and now he sees this new girl transformed because she's broken up with him."

== Live performances and promotion ==
Burke first performed the track at London's Shepherds Bush Empire at a 'Tickled Pink' charity gig. Burke also performed the single on Let's Dance For Sport Relief on 25 February, Daybreak on 9 March, This Morning on 14 March, KoKo Pop on 17 March, T4 on 11 March 2012 and Sport Relief does Glee Club on 15 March 2013.

== Track listing ==
- Digital download
1. "Elephant" – 3:50
2. "Elephant" (Sympho Nympho Remix) – 5:31
3. "Elephant" (Breathless Version) – 4:05
- CD single
1. "Elephant" – 3:50
2. "Elephant" (Sympho Nympho Remix) – 5:31
- Wideboys Remixes single
1. "Elephant" (Wideboys Extended Remix) - 6:07
2. "Elephant" (Wideboys Dub Remix) - 6:07
3. "Elephant" (Wideboys Radio Edit) - 4:02
- Digital EP
1. "Elephant" – 3:50
2. "Elephant" (Sympho Nympho Remix) – 5:31
3. "Elephant" (Breathless Version) – 4:05
4. "Elephant" (Wideboys Extended Remix) - 6:07
5. "Elephant" (Wideboys Dub Remix) - 6:07
6. "Elephant" (Wideboys Radio Edit) - 4:02

== Credits and personnel ==
Recording

- Mastered at 360 Mastering.
- Mixed at The Larks Tongue, Buckinghamshire, England.

Personnel

- Songwriting – Alexandra Burke, Britt Burton, Josh Wilkinson, Erick Morillo, José Nunez, Harry Romero
- Production – Sympho Nympho, Mike Spencer, Erick Morillo
- Vocal arrangement – Matt Schwartz
- Vocal recording – Matt Schwartz
- Vocal production – Matt Schwartz
- Mixing – Mike Spencer
- Programming – Mike Spencer, James David, Liz Horsman
- Mastering – Dave Tuner

Credits adapted from the liner notes of Heartbreak on Hold, Sony, Syco, RCA.

== Charts ==
=== Weekly charts ===
Chart (2012)	Peak position
Belgium (Ultratop 50 Flanders)	43
Belgium (Ultratip Bubbling Under Flanders)	11
Czech Republic Airplay (ČNS IFPI)	54
Ireland (IRMA)	7
Scottish Singles Sales (Official Charts)	2
Slovakia Airplay (ČNS IFPI)	14
South Korea International (Gaon)	70
UK Singles (Official Charts)	3
UK Dance (Official Charts)	1

=== Year-end charts ===
Chart (2012)	Position
UK Singles Chart	162

== Release history ==
Region	Date	Format	Label
Ireland	9 March 2012	Digital download	RCA Records, Syco Music, Sony Music
United Kingdom	11 March 2012	Digital download	RCA Records, Syco Music, Sony Music
France	13 March 2012	Digital download	Subliminal Records
Germany	13 March 2012	Digital download	Subliminal Records
Italy	24 April 2012	CD single	X-Energy Records
