= Let It Go (Alexandra Burke song) =

Single by Alexandra Burke

from the album Heartbreak on Hold
- Released: 27 May 2012
- Genre: Dance-pop
- Length: 3:24
- Label: Syco; RCA
- Songwriters: Belle Humble; Mich Hansen; Jason Gill
- Producers: Cutfather; Gill

Alexandra Burke singles chronology
"Elephant" (2012)	"Let It Go" (2012)	"Where Do Hearts Go" (2014)

Music video
- "Let It Go" on YouTube

"Let It Go" is a song by British recording artist Alexandra Burke from her second studio album, Heartbreak on Hold (2012). It was released in the United Kingdom on 27 May 2012 as the album's second and final single. "Let It Go" is an uptempo 90s throwback dance song drawing influences from the dance-pop and R&B genres.

"Let It Go" received generally favourable reviews from music critics, who deemed the song the best song on the album, along with its catchy tune and production; however, a minority of critics found the song generic. The song was unable to match the success of "Elephant", only peaking inside the UK Top 40.

== Background and release ==
In an interview with Peter Robinson for Popjustice, Burke explained the song's conception and development. Burke revealed that she did not co-write the song, but was involved with the writing camp, a series of sessions where writers and producers met Burke to create material for Heartbreak on Hold, and that "Let It Go" was written during the sessions. She explained the meaning behind the song's lyrics, saying:

For me, it's about letting go of life’s stresses full stop. I’ve had to gain some thick skin while being in this business. I'm not going to say I'm perfect at tackling the negative but I try to turn things that don't feel right into something positive.

On 13 April 2012, "Let It Go" premiered on the Kiss radio station, and serves as Heartbreak on Hold's official second single. "Let It Go" was made available to download via iTunes on 25 May 2012 in Ireland and the United Kingdom, as well as multiple other European countries. It was released as an extended play (EP) and consists of "Let It Go"; "Let It Go" (Bimbo Jones Remix); "Let It Go" (Rui da Silva Remix) and "Let It Go" (Digital Dog Remix); each version can be purchased individually or all together.

== Composition ==
Burke sings the lyric "We get caught up in the little things/ Lose ourselves along the way" "over feather-light club beats" according to Robert Copsey for Digital Spy. The chorus is reminiscent of 90s music.

== Critical reception ==
Robert Copsey for Digital Spy was complimentary of the 90s inspired song, writing that although it is "a smidge predictable," it is difficult to not admire Burke's enthusiasm on "Let It Go". Copsey continued to write that despite the song being about not being stressed and chanting "Let it go", Burke does not "[put] her feet up with a cuppa." Jenny Mensah from 4Music called the song the "most stand-out tune for its catchiness alone", however in-compare to the studio album "[...]Unfortunately, this is because the other tracks fail to grab us in the same way." Matt Collar from Allmusic said tracks like "Let it Go" and "Fire"; "have an infectious house music sound that brings to mind the contemporary dance-pop of Lady Gaga as much as classic '90s diva house artists like Robin S."

Caroline Sullivan for The Guardian was critical of the song, writing that it is "anonymous international dancefloor fodder". Rohin Guha for Flavorpill wrote about the message behind the song: "It’s not surprising the [Dalai Lama]'s words resonate with a subcategory of zen pop, which embraces the spirit of "letting go" to properly celebrate life."

== Music video ==
The music video for "Let It Go" was shot on London Underground on 7 April 2012. The video was released on 25 April 2012 via Burke's official VEVO account.

The video starts with a blue Audi R8 pulling over, playing her previous single, "Elephant". Burke steps out of the car and walks towards a London Underground station. It is at this point that the song begins to play. During the first chorus, Burke makes her way down to the platform.

At the end of the first chorus, Burke steps onto a train and sits down right at the rear of the carriage. During the second verse, she stands up and calls all the passengers to dance, including a businessman and a professional dancer. She walks through to the very front of the train, and it is at the front carriage where Burke and her team start to dance in the carriage. Burke then continues to dance in an empty car park, where she and her team perform a further dance routine. The video finishes with Burke and her dancers posing in the car park.

== Live performances ==
Burke performed an acoustic version of the song on Loose Women in 2012, and also performed the song on the series finale of The Voice of Ireland on 29 April 2012. Burke also performed "Let It Go" on breakfast television show Lorraine on 22 May 2012, where she also gave an interview about the song and Heartbreak on Hold.

== Track listing ==
- Digital download
1. Let It Go – 3:28
- Digital EP
1. Let It Go – 3:28
2. Let It Go (Bimbo Jones Remix) – 3:15
3. Let It Go (Rui da Silva Remix) – 7:53
4. Let It Go (Digital Dog Remix) – 7:38

== Credits and personnel ==
Adapted from the liner notes of Heartbreak on Hold; Syco Music, Sony Music, RCA Records.

Recording locations

- Recorded at Cutfather Studios, Copenhagen, Denmark.
- Mixed at White Room, Copenhagen, Denmark.

Personnel

- Songwriting – Jason Gill, Mich Hansen, Belle Humble
- Production – Cutfather, Jason Gill
- Vocal engineering and recording – Jason Gill
- Mixing – Mads Nilsson
- Instruments and programming – Jason Gill
- Percussion – Mich Hansen

== Chart performance ==
"Let It Go" made its first appearance on the Irish Singles Chart, where it debuted at number 41 on 31 May 2012, becoming her lowest charting single. The following week, it dropped to number 78. In the United Kingdom, the song debuted on the UK Singles Chart at number 33 on 3 June 2012, and therefore debuted at number 33 on the UK Digital Chart with download sales of 11,586. In its second week on the chart, "Let It Go" fell to number 74, selling 4,461 copies.

Chart (2012)	Peak position
CIS Airplay (TopHit)	166
Ireland (IRMA)	41
Scotland (Official Charts Company)	27
South Korea International (Gaon)	23
UK Singles (Official Charts Company)	33

== Release history ==
Country	Date	Format	Label
Belgium	25 May 2012	Digital download, extended play	Sony Music
Czech Republic	25 May 2012	Digital download, extended play	Sony Music
Denmark	25 May 2012	Digital download, extended play	Sony Music
Finland	25 May 2012	Digital download, extended play	Sony Music
France	25 May 2012	Digital download, extended play	Sony Music
Ireland	25 May 2012	Digital download, extended play	Sony Music, RCA Records, Syco Music
Sweden	25 May 2012	Digital download, extended play	Sony Music
Switzerland	25 May 2012	Digital download, extended play	Sony Music
United Kingdom	25 May 2012	Digital download, extended play	Sony Music, RCA Records, Syco Music
United States	28 July 2012	Digital download, extended play	Columbia Records
