= Heartbreak on Hold =

Studio album by Alexandra Burke
- Released: 1 June 2012
- Recorded: 2010–2012
- Genre: EDM
- Length: 41:49
- Labels: RCA; Syco
- Producers: Ben Adams; Cutfather; David Gamson; Fred Falke; Ivar Lisinski; Jason Gill; Jush Wilkinson; Lucas Secon; Michael Woods; Mike Spencer; Red Triangle; Sympho Nympho; iSHi

Alexandra Burke chronology
Overcome (2009)	Heartbreak on Hold (2012)	Christmas Gift (2012)

Singles from Heartbreak on Hold
- 1. "Elephant" Released: 9 March 2012; 2. "Let It Go" Released: 25 May 2012

Heartbreak on Hold is the second studio album by British singer Alexandra Burke. Syco and RCA Records made it available digitally on 1 June 2012, and in physical format on 4 June. Following the success of her debut studio album, Overcome (2009), Burke began work on her sophomore album in late 2010. Described by Burke as a record full of "risks", she worked with a diverse group of artists and producers, including Cutfather, Erick Morillo, Autumn Rowe, and Ben Adams, among others. Additionally, Burke co-wrote three tracks on the album.

Musically, Heartbreak on Hold is an electronic dance record that combines house, eurodance, R&B, and club notes. The majority of the album's themes were loosely inspired by Burke's split from her partner Jermain Defoe in 2012, with the lyrics covering a wide range of topics including freedom, female empowerment, love, heartbreak, and feelings during the relationship with Defoe. Heartbreak on Hold was delayed several times before its release due to the reasons for her departure from Syco and constant rescheduling after signing with RCA, eventually limiting promotional activities to the UK and Europe.

Music critics gave Heartbreak on Hold mixed reviews. Publications were divided on the record's material, production quality, and overall execution, with the majority of criticism directed the album's lack of charisma and originality throughout. Commercially, the album underperformed significantly, peaking in the top forty in Ireland, Scotland, and the United Kingdom. To promote the album, two singles were released: "Elephant" and "Let It Go". The former song was a commercial success in the United Kingdom, while the latter underperformed. Burke also made several appearances in Europe to promote the album.

== Background and production ==
Following the success of her debut studio album Overcome (2009), Burke confirmed in September 2010 that she was in the early stages of writing her second album, emphasising her desire to take "risks" on new material. She started working two months later, and by December, half of the record was finished. She explained the process, saying, "We're just getting down and dirty with the next album. I'm going to take a lot more risks and it's going to be insane."

Burke expressed interest in collaborating with American artists and producers Bruno Mars, Ne-Yo, and StarGate for the record in early 2011, and revealed that she expected producer RedOne to finish the second half of the album. She confirmed that she had collaborated with an "amazing" American artist, but declined to reveal more; "I went to New York in December and it just happened; it wasn't planned. At 7 a.m., I recorded a song with a talented male artist."

Burke temporarily paused work on the record to embark on her All Night Long Tour, which ran from January to August 2011 in the United Kingdom. The tour lasted over seven months, after which they resumed work on the album. She confirmed that the album would be finished by the end of the tour month. Around the same time, she signed an album deal with RCA Records and intended to release it on both RCA and Syco Music. In August, she confirmed her role as an executive producer, stating, "With this one, I haven't let anything go past these ears. I approve everything."

In July 2011, American artist Autumn Rowe confirmed her involvement in the album, saying, "I've cut the first record on hers that I ever did, which is going to be on her album, but I can't tell you the name – we did that whole song in 45 minutes. She walked in, I was like, 'Nice to meet you, I love you, let's go'. 45 minutes later, the record was done. Boom." Colombian DJ Erick Morillo confirmed his involvement in the recording, revealing the track "Elephant" as a collaboration between him and Burke. According to Burke, a large portion of the record featured duets, but the idea was scrapped because it interfered with "the message [she] is trying to get across." By mid-August 2011, Burke confirmed the completion of the album.

== Sound and content ==
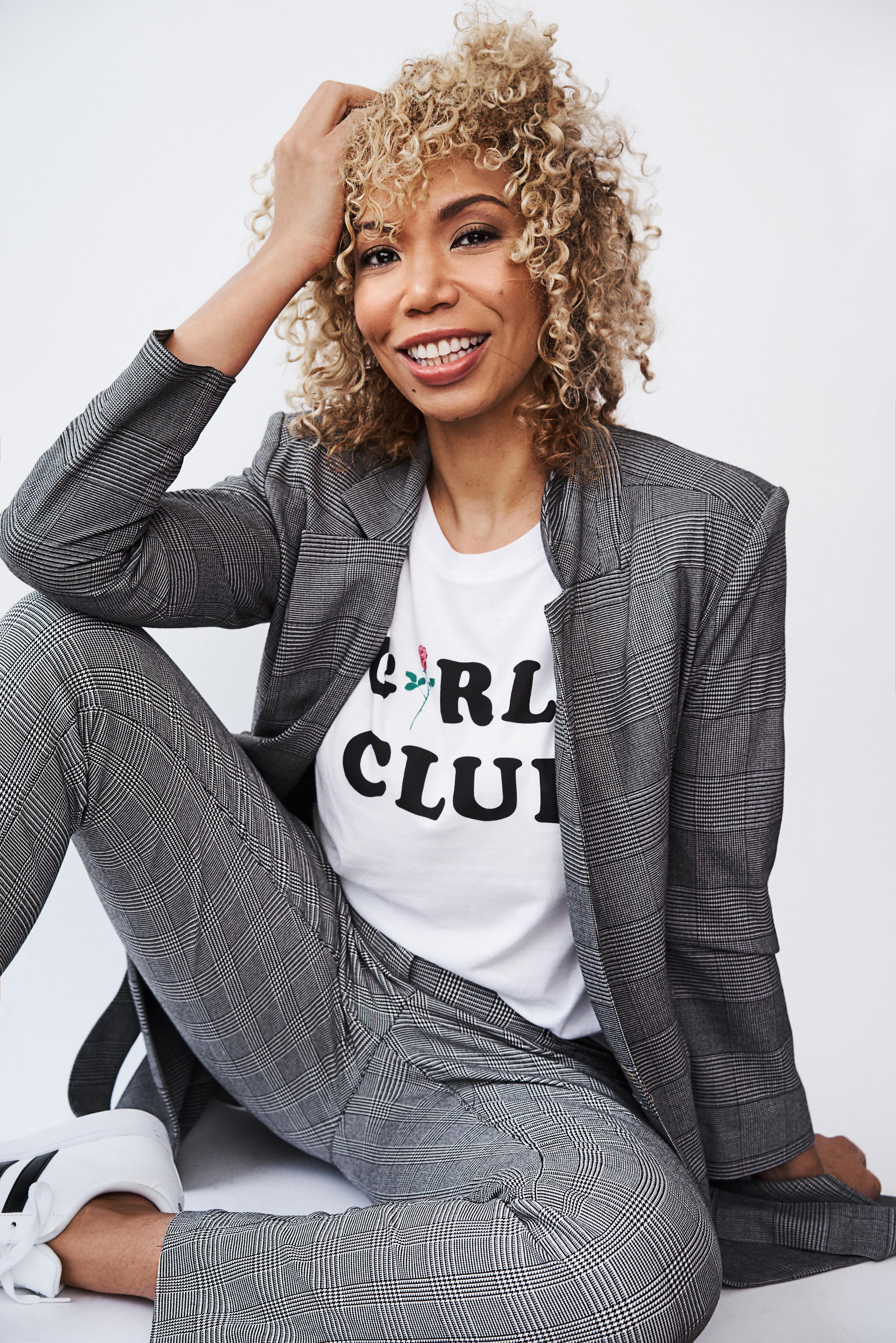
American singer-songwriter Autumn Rowe (pictured) collaborated with Burke on her song "Fire".

Heartbreak on Hold marks a musical departure from her debut, Overcome, which was an R&B album with soul and pop influences. Burke confirmed the album's sonic transition from Overcome, saying, "I've gone in a slightly different direction [...] It's not completely different but it's going to be a lot sexier and a lot more fun." She described the material as "colorful" and "over-the-top". Regarding this departure, she emphasized by saying "A second album should not sound like the first one. I want to better myself and that takes hard work and time. My music has always been R&B and pop, but my voice is soulful. I want every genre of music in a blender: mix it together, the outcome is me." According to AllMusic writer Matt Collar, "Heartbreak on Hold, finds the singer shifting away from the pop/R&B of her debut to a more dance-andclub-oriented sound."

The album opens with the title track, a europop song with rave-inspired synths and heavy bass lines that serves as the album's musical centrepiece. "Elephant" is one of two songs co-written by Burke that was inspired by 1990s music and culture; musically, it is a heavy electro-driven track with autotune and vocoder effects on Burke's vocals. "Let It Go" is a 90s-style house-club song about letting go and having fun. "This Love Will Survive" is a love song with additional orchestral instrumentation and a "rousy" melody similar to the work of British band Coldplay. Burke referred to "Fire" as a "sexy, female-empowering" song sung over a heavy house beat. Critics likened "Fire" and "This Love Will Survive" to works by American artists Lady Gaga and Robin S. "Between the Sheets" is the album's first midtempo track, with a slower beat that contrasts with the rest of the record's dance-heavy sound. The song's lyrics focus on sex and its importance in relationships.

Michael Woods produced "Daylight Robbery," an EDM song about a guy who "steals your heart and you didn't expect it." "Tonight" was originally produced and performed by Russian musician DJ Smash and Fast Foods under the name "Wave". Another dance song, "Tonight," was covered by Romanian singer Inna for her album Party Never Ends (2013). "Love You That Much" was written as a tribute to Burke's fan base and is a musical uptempo dance number similar to Australian singer Kylie Minogue's work. Burke describes "Oh La La" as a song about making that guy work for it, citing the lyrics "If you want me for the night, even for the first kiss, put your money where your mouth is," while it samples Crystal Waters' dance single "Gypsy Woman". "Sitting on Top of the World" is a song with lyrics about her childhood lifestyle, memories, and having fun while learning life lessons from her parents. Burke's piano ballad "What Money Can't Buy" is one of the album's three songs co-written by her.

== Release and formats ==
Heartbreak on Hold and its singles were repeatedly delayed before being released. Burke had hoped to release the album later that year, but it was pushed back. British media speculated that its shelved date was chosen to avoid conflicts with albums released by other X Factor alumni that year, including Matt Cardle, Cher Lloyd, One Direction, and Leona Lewis. Burke also stated that "Elephant" would be released as a single in September, which did not occur, prompting Burke to apologise. Three months later, she confirmed that the album would be postponed until 2012 so she could complete it.

Burke told Digital Spy that the album's single, "Elephant," was delayed from February to March 2012. In April, she revealed the album's title, Heartbreak on Hold, and that it would be released on 4 June 2012. Regarding the album's title, she explained: "When I first heard the song [Heartbreak on Hold] it spoke a lot about what I'd been through in the past year-and-a-half in terms of making my album, stuff that went on in my personal life and I'm the kind of girl that has learnt to turn anything negative into a positive." A month later, she revealed the album's artwork and tracklist, as well as a 30-second sample of each song.

Heartbreak on Hold was only physically distributed in Europe, Ireland, and the United Kingdom. On 1 June 2012, a promotional copy of the album was printed, with standard versions following a few days later. The CD version had 12 tracks in total, all formatted in a standard jewel case. The digital version added four new tracks: two original recordings, "Devil in Me" and "Beating Still," as well as acoustic versions of the title track and "Let It Go." Eventually, the album became available through digital and streaming services worldwide.

== Singles and live appearances ==
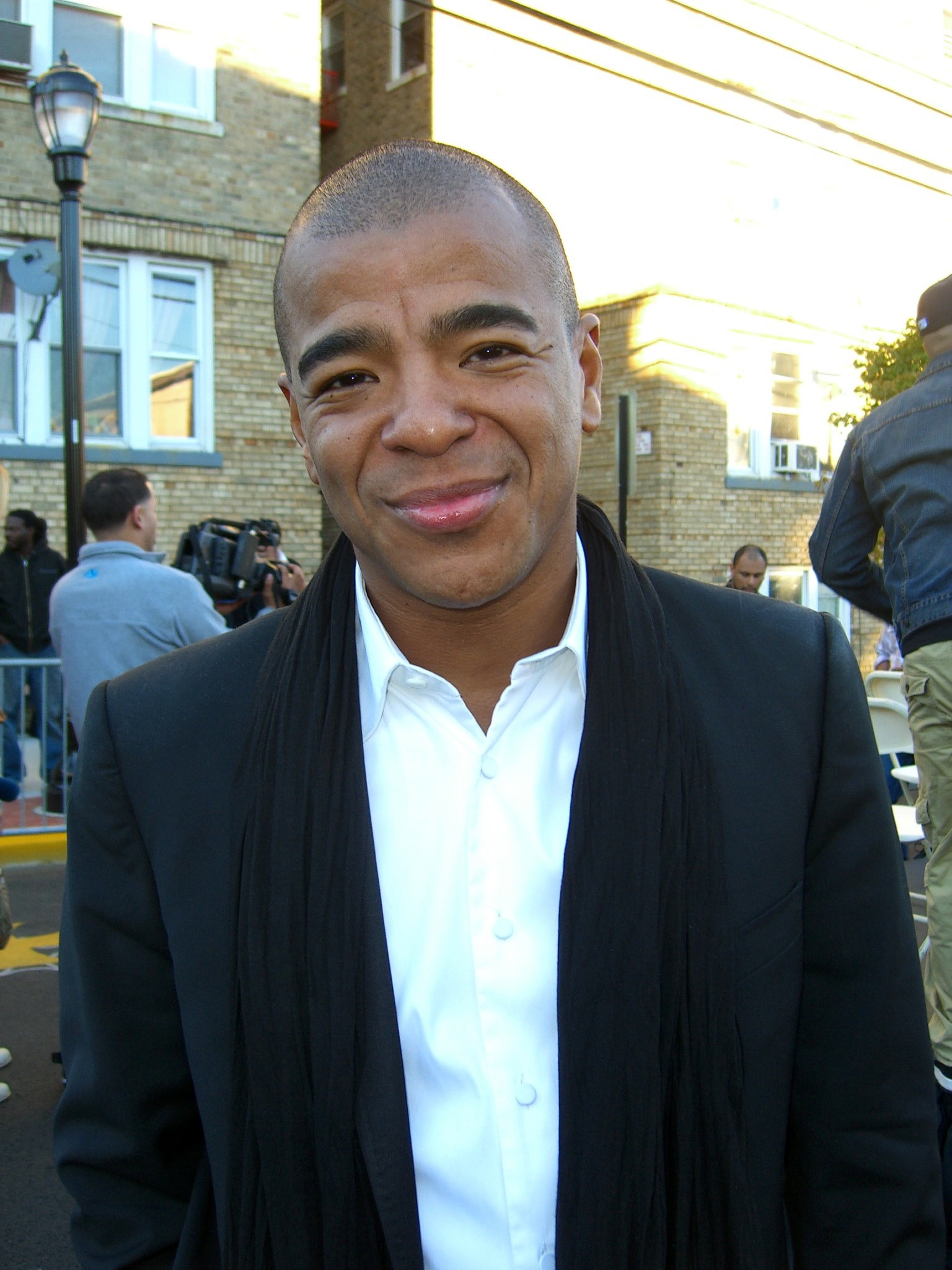
Colombian-American DJ Erick Morillo (pictured) featured on Burke's single "Elephant"

The album's lead single, "Elephant," features DJ and co-producer Erick Morillo. Following several delays, the song was released on 9 March 2012, in both physical and digital formats, with each version including remixes of the track. Music critics gave the song mixed reviews, with disagreements about its production, sound, and Burke's performance. Commercially, it was a success in the UK, peaking at number three on the UK singles chart, her second-highest performance to date. In early April 2012, a music video was released showing the singer and backup dancers having fun while performing in an underground facility.

"Let It Go" was the album's second single, released on 22 May 2015. The digital formats featured several remixes of the single. The track received mixed reviews, with some citing production issues and a lack of originality. However, some critics praised its catchiness. Commercially, the single underperformed in the UK, peaking at 33 on the UK singles chart, her lowest-performing single to date. Burke originally planned a third single with a male artist. However, the idea never materialised, and plans were abandoned.

Burke promoted her album by appearing on several television and live shows. Burke first performed "Let It Go" on The Voice of Ireland season finale on 29 April 2012, and on Lorraine, a breakfast television show in the United Kingdom, on 22 May 2012, where she also gave an interview about the song and Heartbreak on Hold. Burke then performed an acoustic version of the title track "Heartbreak on Hold" on the daytime talk show Loose Women. She played a live acoustic set in Le Mans, France, on 15 June 2012, and at Signal 1's Stoke 2012 Live festival weekend the next day.

Burke recorded four songs in front of a small crowd for an event called "An Audience with Alexandra Burke". That Grapejuice recorded the performance and uploaded it on their website. Burke performed at Manchester's MEN Arena on 19 July 2012, and again at Liverpool Arena for Radio City Live 2012 on 21 July. One day later, Burke appeared on KEY 103 Live in Manchester alongside One Direction, Rizzle Kicks, Little Mix and Will Young, as well as at Party in the Park in Leeds. Burke gave a concert in London's Hyde Park on 2 August as part of BT's London Live celebrations of the 2012 Summer Olympics. On 15 September, Burke headlined Scotland's Youth Beatz music festival.

== Critical reception ==
Professional ratings
Review scores
Source	Rating
4Music	2.5/5 stars
AllMusic	3.5/5 stars
Daily Express	3/5 stars
Digital Spy	3/5 stars
The Guardian	3/5 stars
The Independent	2/5 stars
The Observer	2/5 stars

Heartbreak on Hold received mixed reviews from music critics. AllMusic's Matt Collar was fairly positive, writing, "Burke delivers a handful of high-energy electro-house-inflected material that showcases her yearning, passionate vocal style." He also praised the overall sound and production value, saying "these are hot, modern productions which, while deriving inspiration from the early-'90s club sound, never sound anything less than fresh." Robert Corspey of Digital Spy also praised the record's sound and simplicity, saying, "The message [on Heartbreak on Hold] is simple: to forget life's troubles and have a good time. Which would be fine, if the charts weren't already clogged up with similar affirmations to the same Euro-pop tune."

Some critics were divided on Burke's material and lack of character. Jenny Mensah from 4Music praised the slower songs and specific melodies, writing, "Alexandra Burke's second album has some catchy tunes, smooth sounds and great production. However, where this album works best is when it blends the right amount of beats, synths and vocal licks." Simon Gage from Daily Express agreed, writing: "It seems to be very little charisma on this new album of driving pop/dance that she insists has an emotional underpinning." Caroline Sullivan from The Guardian said "The album falls back on the Auto-Tuned pyrotechnics and clinical club-pop that has currently turned the singles chart into a featureless wasteland, Burke follows a well-travelled road, losing her likable personality en route."

Other critics dismissed the effort as a whole; Andy Gill from The Independent felt that "the plethora of producers [on Heartbreak on Hold] renders the music blandly generic, another round of Guetta-style synth-stomps and incessant keyboard vamps, largely interchangeable with those on Rihanna's and Madonna's last albums." The Observer's writer Hermione Hoby was particularly negative, writing "Heartbreak on Hold is a strong argument for a moratorium on songs featuring effects-laden instances of the word "tonight". It seems to feature in almost every track on Alexandra Burke's second album of relentlessly unimaginative house, each excessively Auto-Tuned Euro-club banger indistinguishable from the next."

== Commercial performance ==
Heartbreak on Hold underperformed in the UK. The album debuted at number 18 on the UK Albums Chart, selling 6,731 copies in its first week, a significant drop from her previous album Overcome, which sold 132,065 units in its debut week. In its third week, it had dropped to number 92 with 1,565 units sold, and by July 2012, the album had sold 10,571 units in the UK, accounting for 4.73% of Overcome's total three-week sales of 223,407 units. The album peaked at number 27 on Ireland's regional albums chart, making it her lowest charting effort. In Scotland, it reached number 20 on the Scottish Albums Chart. The album, along with its singles, performed poorly, and numerous articles reported that the UK's national radio stations refused to include the album's content on their playlists.

== Track listing ==
Heartbreak on Hold track listing
No.	Title	Writer(s)	Producer(s)	Length
1.	"Heartbreak on Hold"	David Gamson; Erika Nuri	Gamson	3:20
2.	"Elephant" (featuring Erick Morillo)	Alexandra Burke; Brittany Burton; Josh Wilkinson; Erick Morillo; Harry Romero; Jose Nuñez	Sympho Nympho; Mike Spencer	3:47
3.	"Let It Go"	Belle Humble; Mich "Cuthfather" Hansen; Jason Gill	Cutfather; Gill	3:24
4.	"This Love Will Survive"	Daniel Davidsen; Gill; Hansen; Sonia Clarke	Cutfather; Gill; Davidsen	3:23
5.	"Fire"	Autumn Rowe; Charlie Bernardo; Eshraque "iSHi" Mughal	iSHi	3:28
6.	"Between the Sheets"	Burton; Dee Adam; Wilkinson	Cutfather; Gill	3:09
7.	"Daylight Robbery"	Gavin Jones; Marlene Strand; Michael Woods	Woods	3:15
8.	"Tonight"	Burke; Andrey "DJ Smash" Shirman; Antoine Konrad; Fabio Antoniali; Lucas Secon; Pablo Rodriguez; Thomas Troelsen	Secon; DJ Smash; DJ Antoine^{[a]}; Yoko^{[a]}	3:41
9.	"Love You That Much"	Burton; Fred Falke	Falke	3:16
10.	"Oh La La"	Crystal Waters; Jones; Ivar Lisinski; Strand; Neal Brian Conway	Lisinski	3:29
11.	"Sitting on Top of the World"	Burton; Adam; George Tizzard; Rick Parkhouse; Wilkinson; Roy Stride	Wilkinson; Red Triangle	3:27
12.	"What Money Can't Buy"	Burke; Ben Adams	Adams	4:10
Total length:				41:49

Bonus tracks
No.	Title	Writer(s)	Producer(s)	Length
13.	"Devil in Me"	Bryn Christopher; Pete Martin	Martin	3:40
14.	"Beating Still"	Carl Ryden; Cozi Costi; Nina Woodford	Ryden	3:35
15.	"Heartbreak on Hold" (acoustic version)	Gamson; Nuri	Wilkinson	3:16
16.	"Let It Go" (acoustic version)	Humble; Hansen; Gill	Wilkinson	3:36
Total length:				56:03

Notes

- ^{^[a]} signifies a remix producer

Sample credits

- "Oh La La" interpolates portions of the composition entitled "Gypsy Woman (She's Homeless)" by Crystal Waters.
- "Devil in Me" interpolates portions of the composition entitled "Love Sensation" by Loleatta Holloway.

== Charts ==
Weekly chart performance for Heartbreak on Hold
Chart (2012)	Peak position
Irish Albums (Official Charts)	27
Scottish Albums (Official Charts)	10
UK Albums (Official Charts)	18

== Release history ==
Release dates and formats for Heartbreak on Hold
Region	Date	Format(s)	Label	Ref.
United Kingdom	1 June 2012	Promo CD	RCA; Syco	
Ireland	4 June 2012	CD	RCA; Syco	
Europe	4 June 2012	CD	RCA; Syco	
United Kingdom	4 June 2012	CD	RCA; Syco	
Various	4 June 2012	Digital download; streaming	RCA; Syco	
