= James Arthur discography =

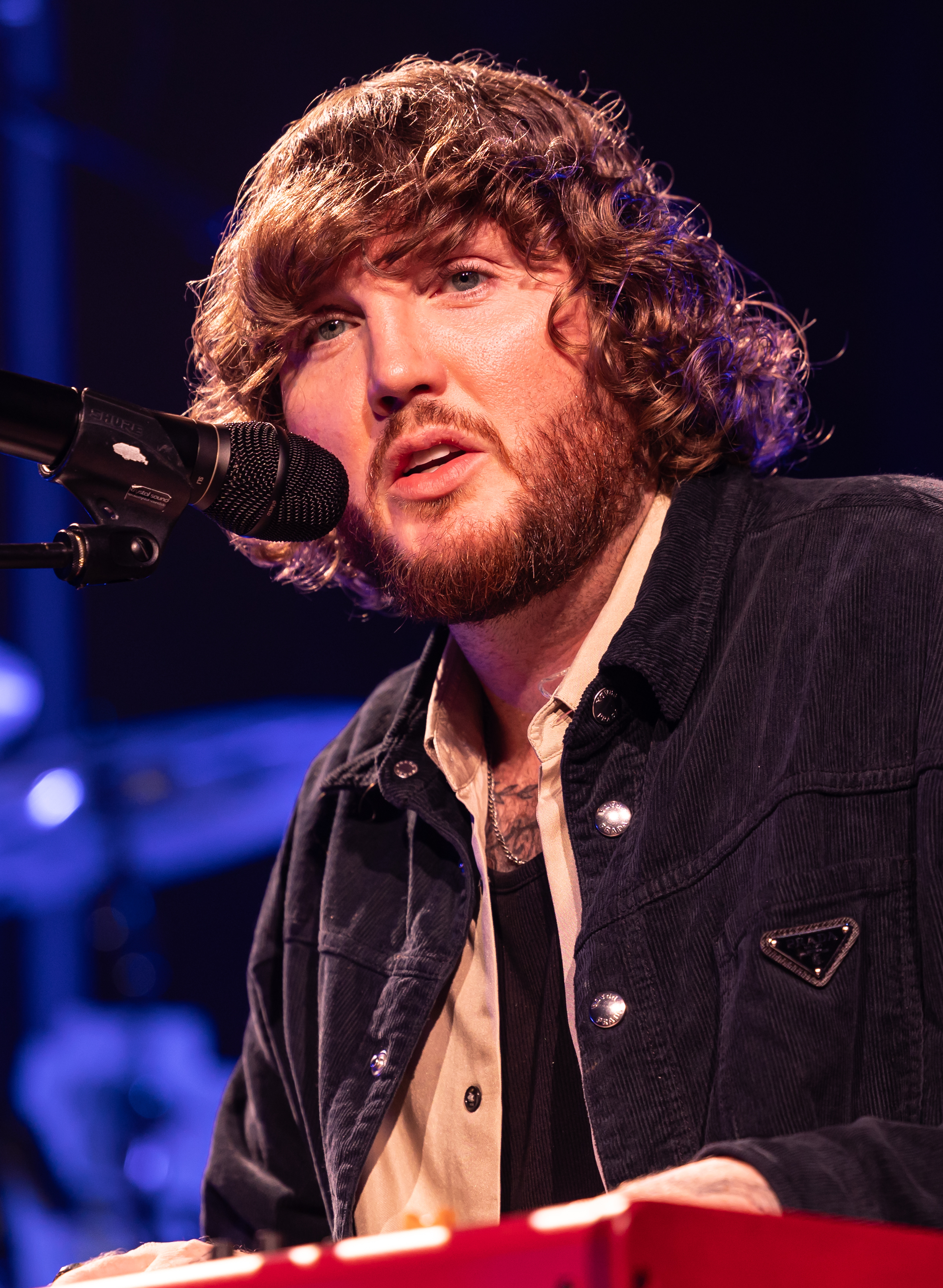
- Arthur performing in September 2023
- Studio albums: 6
- EPs: 3
- Singles: 43
- Music videos: 31

British singer James Arthur has released six studio albums, forty-one singles (including eight as a featured artist), and thirty music videos. He won the ninth series of The X Factor in 2012 and released "Impossible" as the winner's single.

Following his X Factor victory, Arthur's winner's song, a cover of Shontelle's 2010 song "Impossible", was released as a charity single for Together for Short Lives. The single topped the UK Singles Chart in its first week of release. After 11 days, it was the seventh-biggest-selling debut single from any contestant from The X Factor, with sales of 622,000. After three weeks, it was the fifth-best-selling single of 2012, with 897,000 copies sold. The song also peaked at number one in Ireland, number two in Australia, New Zealand and Switzerland. By 2015 it had sold over 1.4 million copies in the UK, overtaking Alexandra Burke's "Hallelujah" to become the best-selling winner's single ever.

On 7 August 2013, Arthur announced that his next single would be called "You're Nobody 'til Somebody Loves You". The song was released on 20 October 2013 and debuted at number two in the UK, falling just behind Lorde's "Royals". Arthur's self-titled debut studio album, James Arthur, was released on 4 November 2013. The album charted in the UK at number two, behind Eminem's The Marshall Mathers LP 2. "Recovery" was released as the album's third single on 15 December 2013 and debuted at number 19 on the UK Singles Chart.

In 2014, following a string of controversies in the British media, he parted ways with Syco Music, and in September 2015 he signed to Columbia Records in Germany. A year later, he released a new single, "Say You Won't Let Go"—the first from his second studio album, Back from the Edge—which gave him his second UK chart-topper, and as of November 2017 it had sold two million copies worldwide. It also became his breakthrough hit in the US, reaching number 11 on the Billboard Hot 100 and being certified triple platinum.

In 2018, Arthur was featured in "The Power of Love", the UK X Factor-winning song by the season 15 winner Dalton Harris. The duet was a cover of an original by Frankie Goes to Hollywood from 1984.

Arthur's third studio album, You, was released on 18 October 2019; the album debuted at number 2 on the UK Albums Chart, where it stayed for one week.

His fourth studio album, It'll All Make Sense in the End, debuted at number 3 on the UK Albums chart in 2021.

Arthur's fifth album, Bitter Sweet Love, became his second UK Albums Chart Number One in February 2024, as well as becoming his highest charting album in Germany.

== Albums ==
=== Studio albums ===
List of albums, with selected chart positions and certifications
Title	Details	Peak chart positions										Certifications
Title	Details	UK	AUS	AUT	BEL	GER	IRE	NZ	SWE	SWI	US	Certifications
James Arthur	Released: 4 November 2013; Label: Syco; Formats: CD, digital download, streaming	2	14	22	55	25	2	11	—	6	—	BPI: Platinum; IRMA: Gold; RMNZ: Platinum
Back from the Edge	Released: 28 October 2016; Label: Columbia; Formats: CD, digital download, LP, streaming	1	8	38	19	38	2	17	9	7	39	BPI: Platinum; GLF: Gold; MC: 2× Platinum; RMNZ: 3× Platinum
You	Released: 18 October 2019; Label: Columbia; Formats: CD, digital download, LP, streaming	2	23	31	87	35	7	33	—	5	186	BPI: Gold; RMNZ: Platinum
It'll All Make Sense in the End	Released: 5 November 2021; Label: Columbia; Formats: Cassette, CD, digital download, LP, streaming	3	—	41	118	59	10	37	—	16	—	BPI: Silver
Bitter Sweet Love	Released: 26 January 2024; Label: Columbia; Formats: CD, digital download, LP, streaming	1	—	29	33	12	15	—	—	8	—	BPI: Silver
Pisces	Released: 25 April 2025; Label: Columbia; Formats: CD, digital download, LP, streaming	3	—	15	78	34	—	—	—	27	—	
"—" denotes releases that did not chart or were not released in that territory.

==== Independent studio albums ====
List of independently released albums
Title	Details
Sins by the Sea	Released: 6 March 2011; Label: 57; Format: Digital download

=== Mixtapes ===
List of mixtapes
Title	Details
All the World's a Stage	Released: 15 May 2014; Label: Independent; Format: Digital download

== Extended plays ==
List of extended plays
Title	Details
Hold On (Note: Released as The James Arthur Project)	Released: 25 August 2012; Label: Independent; Format: Digital download
Undiscovered Acoustic (Note: Released as The James Arthur Project)	Released: 13 May 2013; Label: Independent; Format: Digital download
Apple Music Home Sessions (Note: Apple Exclusive)	Released: 2 July 2021; Label: Columbia; Format: Digital download

== Singles ==
=== As lead artist ===
List of singles, with selected chart positions and certifications
Title	Year	Peak chart positions										Certifications	Album
Title	Year	UK	AUS	AUT	BEL	GER	IRE	NZ	SWE	SWI	US	Certifications	Album
"Impossible"	2012	1	2	4	3	5	1	2	39	2	—	BPI: 4× Platinum; ARIA: 5× Platinum; BEA: Platinum; BVMI: 3× Platinum; GLF: Platinum; IFPI AUT: Gold; IFPI SWI: 2× Platinum; RMNZ: 4× Platinum	James Arthur
"You're Nobody 'til Somebody Loves You"	2013	2	22	55	78	54	12	17	—	38	—	BPI: Silver	James Arthur
"Recovery"	2013	19	—	—	59	—	40	—	—	—	—	BPI: Silver	James Arthur
"Get Down"	2014	96	—	—	—	—	—	—	—	28	—		James Arthur
"Say You Won't Let Go"	2016	1	1	5	10	6	1	1	1	4	11	BPI: 7× Platinum; ARIA: 19× Platinum; BEA: 2× Platinum; GLF: 7× Platinum; IFPI AUT: Gold; IFPI SWI: Platinum; RIAA: Diamond; RMNZ: 9× Platinum	Back from the Edge
"Safe Inside"	2017	31	—	—	67	—	54	—	—	—	—	BPI: Platinum; RMNZ: Gold	Back from the Edge
"Can I Be Him"	2017	69	—	—	46	—	76	—	72	—	—	BPI: 2× Platinum; RMNZ: 2× Platinum	Back from the Edge
"Naked"	2017	11	—	26	38	23	28	— (Note: "Naked" did not enter the NZ Top 40 Singles Chart, but peaked at number two on the NZ Heatseeker Singles Chart.)	36	8	— (Note: "Naked" did not enter the Billboard Hot 100, but peaked at number 25 on the Bubbling Under Hot 100 chart.)	BPI: Platinum; ARIA: Gold; BVMI: Platinum; GLF: Gold; IFPI SWI: Platinum; RIAA: Gold; RMNZ: Platinum	You
"You Deserve Better / At My Weakest"	2018	53	68	—	—	—	48	— (Note: "You Deserve Better" did not enter the NZ Top 40 Singles Chart, but peaked at number five on the NZ Heatseeker Singles Chart.)	—	72	—	BPI: Silver	Non-album single
"Empty Space"	2018	22	—	63	—	99	28	— (Note: "Empty Space" did not enter the NZ Top 40 Singles Chart, but peaked at number 23 on the NZ Hot Singles Chart.)	93	40	—	BPI: Platinum; RMNZ: Gold	You
"Rewrite the Stars" (with Anne-Marie)	2018	7	67	—	7	100	12	—	27	44	— (Note: "Rewrite the Stars" did not enter the Billboard Hot 100, but peaked at number 24 on the Bubbling Under Hot 100 chart.)	BPI: 2× Platinum; RIAA: Gold; RMNZ: Platinum	The Greatest Showman: Reimagined
"Nobody" (with Martin Jensen)	2019	52	—	—	—	—	27	—	73	87	—	BPI: Silver; RMNZ: Gold	Non-album single
"Falling Like the Stars"	2019	25	51	—	—	—	28	— (Note: "Falling Like the Stars" did not enter the NZ Top 40 Singles Chart, but peaked at number seven on the NZ Hot Singles Chart.)	49	28	—	BPI: Platinum; IFPI SWI: Gold; RMNZ: Platinum	You
"Treehouse" (with Ty Dolla $ign featuring Shotty Horroh)	2019	— (Note: "Treehouse" did not enter the Official Singles Chart, but peaked at number 54 on the Official Singles Downloads Chart.)	—	—	—	—	—	— (Note: "Treehouse" did not enter the NZ Top 40 Singles Chart, but peaked at number 22 on the NZ Hot Singles Chart.)	—	—	—		You
"Finally Feel Good"	2019	— (Note: "Finally Feel Good" did not enter the Official Singles Chart, but peaked at number 81 on the Official Singles Downloads Chart.)	—	—	—	—	—	— (Note: "Finally Feel Good" did not enter the NZ Top 40 Singles Chart, but peaked at number 21 on the NZ Hot Singles Chart.)	—	—	—		You
"You" (featuring Travis Barker)	2019	—	—	—	—	—	—	— (Note: "You" did not enter the NZ Top 40 Singles Chart, but peaked at number 30 on the NZ Hot Singles Chart.)	—	—	—		You
"Quite Miss Home"	2019	77	—	—	—	—	60	— (Note: "Quite Miss Home" did not enter the NZ Top 40 Singles Chart, but peaked at number 15 on the NZ Hot Singles Chart.)	—	56	—	BPI: Silver	You
"Lasting Lover" (with Sigala)	2020	10	17	—	—	—	15	31	94	41	—	BPI: Platinum; ARIA: 2× Platinum; RIAA: Gold; RMNZ: 2× Platinum	Every Cloud – Silver Linings
"Medicine"	2021	41	—	—	—	—	55	— (Note: "Medicine" did not enter the NZ Top 40 Singles Chart, but peaked at number 13 on the NZ Hot Singles Chart.)	— (Note: "Medicine" did not enter the Swedish Singellista Chart, but peaked at number five on the Swedish Heatseeker Chart.)	98	—	BPI: Silver	It'll All Make Sense in the End
"September"	2021	55	—	—	—	—	54	— (Note: "September" did not enter the NZ Top 40 Singles Chart, but peaked at number 15 on the NZ Hot Singles Chart.)	— (Note: "September" did not enter the Swedish Singellista Chart, but peaked at number 10 on the Swedish Heatseeker Chart.)	—	—	BPI: Silver	It'll All Make Sense in the End
"Avalanche"	2021	— (Note: "Avalanche" did not enter the Official Singles Chart, but peaked at number 37 on the Official Singles Downloads Chart.)	—	—	—	—	—	— (Note: "Avalanche" did not enter the NZ Top 40 Singles Chart, but peaked at number 24 on the NZ Hot Singles Chart.)	— (Note: "Avalanche" did not enter the Swedish Singellista Chart, but peaked at number 17 on the Swedish Heatseeker Chart.)	—	—		It'll All Make Sense in the End
"Emily"	2021	82	—	—	—	—	98	— (Note: "Emily" did not enter the NZ Top 40 Singles Chart, but peaked at number 22 on the NZ Hot Singles Chart.)	—	—	—		It'll All Make Sense in the End
"SOS"	2021	— (Note: "SOS" did not enter the Official Singles Chart, but peaked at number 53 on the Official Singles Downloads Chart.)	—	—	—	—	—	— (Note: "SOS" did not enter the NZ Top 40 Singles Chart, but peaked at number 19 on the NZ Hot Singles Chart.)	—	—	—		It'll All Make Sense in the End
"Christmas Bells"	2021	— (Note: "Christmas Bells" did not enter the Official Singles Chart, but peaked at number 49 on the Official Singles Downloads Chart.)	—	—	—	—	—	—	—	—	—		Non-album single
"Lose My Mind" (featuring Josh Franceschi)	2022	—	—	—	—	—	—	— (Note: "Lose My Mind" did not enter the NZ Top 40 Singles Chart, but peaked at number 35 on the NZ Hot Singles Chart.)	—	—	—		It'll All Make Sense in the End (Deluxe)
"Questions" (with Lost Frequencies)	2022	—	—	—	13	—	—	— (Note: "Questions" did not enter the NZ Top 40 Singles Chart, but peaked at number 14 on the NZ Hot Singles Chart.)	— (Note: "Questions" did not enter the Swedish Singellista Chart, but peaked at number eight on the Swedish Heatseeker Chart.)	87	—		All Stand Together
"Lose You" (with Afrojack)	2022	—	—	—	—	—	—	—	—	—	—		Non-album single
"Heartbeat"	2022	— (Note: "Heartbeat" did not enter the Official Singles Chart, but peaked at number 31 on the Official Singles Downloads Chart.)	—	—	—	—	—	— (Note: "Heartbeat" did not enter the NZ Top 40 Singles Chart, but peaked at number 27 on the NZ Hot Singles Chart.)	—	—	—		Bitter Sweet Love (Deluxe)
"Work with My Love" (with Alok)	2023	—	—	—	47	—	—	— (Note: "Work with My Love" did not enter the NZ Top 40 Singles Chart, but peaked at number 29 on the NZ Hot Singles Chart.)	—	—	—		Non-album single
"A Year Ago"	2023	91	—	—	—	—	87	— (Note: "A Year Ago" did not enter the NZ Top 40 Singles Chart, but peaked at number 10 on the NZ Hot Singles Chart.)	—	—	—		Bitter Sweet Love
"Blindside"	2023	— (Note: "Blindside" did not enter the Official Singles Chart, but peaked at number 16 on the Official Singles Downloads Chart.)	—	—	—	—	—	— (Note: "Blindside" did not enter the NZ Top 40 Singles Chart, but peaked at number 28 on the NZ Hot Singles Chart.)	—	—	—		Bitter Sweet Love
"Just Us"	2023	81	—	—	—	—	—	— (Note: "Just Us" did not enter the NZ Top 40 Singles Chart, but peaked at number 30 on the NZ Hot Singles Chart.)	—	—	—		Bitter Sweet Love
"Homecoming"	2023	—	—	—	—	—	—	— (Note: "Homecoming" did not enter the NZ Top 40 Singles Chart, but peaked at number 34 on the NZ Hot Singles Chart.)	—	—	—		Bitter Sweet Love
"Sleepwalking"	2023	—	—	—	—	—	—	— (Note: "Sleepwalking" did not enter the NZ Top 40 Singles Chart, but peaked at number 26 on the NZ Hot Singles Chart.)	—	—	—		Bitter Sweet Love
"Bitter Sweet Love"	2024	— (Note: "Bitter Sweet Love" did not enter the Official Singles Chart, but peaked at number 57 on the Official Singles Downloads Chart.)	—	—	—	—	—	— (Note: "Bitter Sweet Love" did not enter the NZ Top 40 Singles Chart, but peaked at number 40 on the NZ Hot Singles Chart.)	—	—	—		Bitter Sweet Love
"From the Jump" (with Kelly Clarkson)	2024	— (Note: "From The Jump" did not enter the Official Singles Chart, but peaked at number 29 on the Official Singles Downloads Chart.)	—	—	—	—	—	— (Note: "From the Jump" did not enter the NZ Top 40 Singles Chart, but peaked at number 37 on the NZ Hot Singles Chart.)	—	—	—		Bitter Sweet Love (Deluxe)
"ADHD"	2024	— (Note: "ADHD" did not enter the Official Singles Chart, but peaked at number 28 on the Official Singles Downloads Chart.)	—	—	—	—	—	— (Note: "ADHD" did not enter the NZ Top 40 Singles Chart, but peaked at number 39 on the NZ Hot Singles Chart.)	—	—	—		Pisces
"Celebrate"	2025	— (Note: "Celebrate" did not enter the Official Singles Chart, but peaked at number 30 on the Official Singles Downloads Chart.)	—	—	—	—	—	— (Note: "Celebrate" did not enter the NZ Top 40 Singles Chart, but peaked at number 33 on the NZ Hot Singles Chart.)	—	—	—		Pisces
"Embers"	2025	— (Note: "Embers" did not enter the Official Singles Chart, but peaked at number 64 on the Official Singles Downloads Chart.)	—	—	—	—	—	—	—	—	—		Pisces
"Karaoke"	2025	— (Note: "Karaoke" did not enter the Official Singles Chart, but peaked at number 57 on the Official Singles Downloads Chart.)	—	—	—	—	—	—	—	—	—		Pisces
"Cruel"	2025	—	—	—	—	—	—	—	—	—	—		Pisces
"At Last"	2026	—	—	—	—	—	—	—	—	—	—		Non-album single
"Waste My Tears"	2026	— (Note: "Waste My Tears" did not enter the Official Singles Chart, but peaked at number 17 on the Official Singles Downloads Chart.)	—	—	—	—	—	—	—	—	—		TBA
"—" denotes releases that did not chart or were not released in that territory.

=== As featured artist ===
List of singles, with selected chart positions
Title	Year	Peak chart positions							Certifications	Album
Title	Year	UK	AUS	AUT	GER	IRE	SWE	SWI	Certifications	Album
"Wrecking Ball" (Alonzo Holt featuring James Arthur)	2013	97	—	—	—	70	—	—		The Second Chapter
"Kryptonite" (Rymez featuring James Arthur)	2014	—	—	—	—	—	—	—		Non-album singles
"Otherwise" (MOKS featuring James Arthur)	2015	—	—	—	—	—	—	—		Non-album singles
"Go for Broke" (Machine Gun Kelly featuring James Arthur)	2017	—	—	—	—	—	—	—		bloom
"Bridge over Troubled Water" (as part of Artists for Grenfell)	2017	1	53	32	—	25	—	28	BPI: Gold	Non-album single
"Sun Comes Up" (Rudimental featuring James Arthur)	2017	6	57	50	76	15	80	48	BPI: 2× Platinum; ARIA: 2× Platinum; BVMI: Gold; RMNZ: Platinum	Toast to Our Differences
"You Can Cry" (Marshmello and Juicy J featuring James Arthur)	2018	91	—	—	—	—	—	—		Non-album singles
"The Power of Love" (Dalton Harris featuring James Arthur)	2018	4	—	—	—	35	—	—		Non-album singles
"—" denotes releases that did not chart or were not released in that territory.

=== Promotional singles ===
List of singles, with selected peak chart positions and certifications
Title	Year	Peak chart positions					Certifications	Album
Title	Year	US	CAN	NZ Hot	UK	WW	Certifications	Album
"The Truth"	2016	—	—	—	—	—		Back from the Edge
"Let Me Love the Lonely" (Note: The duet version of the song was only released in Poland.) (featuring MaRina)	2016	—	—	—	—	—	ZPAV: Gold	Back from the Edge
"Sorry" (with NF)	2025	70	72	6	73	192		Fear
"—" denotes releases that did not chart or were not released in that territory.

== Other charted songs ==
List of other charted songs, with selected chart positions and certifications
Title	Year	Peak chart positions									Certifications	Album
Title	Year	UK	AUS	BEL	GER	IRE	NZ Hot	SCO	SWE	SWI	Certifications	Album
"Certain Things"	2013	162	—	—	—	—	—	—	—	—	BPI: Silver; RMNZ: Gold	James Arthur
"Is This Love"	2013	164	—	—	—	—	—	—	—	—		James Arthur
"Sermon" (featuring Shotty Horroh)	2016	—	—	—	—	—	—	98	—	—		Back from the Edge
"Train Wreck"	2020	16	45	45	98	16	—	83	23	69	BPI: Platinum; ARIA: Platinum; BEA: Gold; BVMI: Gold; GLF: Gold; IFPI SWI: Gold; RIAA: Platinum; RMNZ: 2× Platinum	Back from the Edge
"Deja Vu"	2021	—	—	—	—	—	35	—	—	—		It'll All Make Sense in the End
"Car's Outside"	2022	78	—	—	—	63	—	—	— (Note: "Car's Outside" did not enter the Swedish Singellista Chart, but peaked at number four on the Swedish Heatseeker Chart.)	—	BPI: Gold; RMNZ: Gold	You
"—" denotes releases that did not chart or were not released in that territory.

== Other appearances ==
List of non-single songs which do not feature on an album by Arthur
Title	Year	Album(s)	Artist
"Flowers"	2018	Other People's Heartache (Pt. 4)	Bastille featuring Rationale
"Burn Me Alive"	2019	Things I've Seen	Alex Hepburn
"You Go First"	2021	The Cave Sessions, Vol. 1	Diane Warren

== Music videos ==
List of music videos, showing director
Title	Year	Director
"Impossible"	2012	Claudia Wass
"You're Nobody 'til Somebody Loves You"	2013	Emil Nava
"Recovery"	2013	Emil Nava
"Get Down"	2014	Matt Fleming
"Kryptonite" (Rymez x James Arthur)	2014	IMA Productions
"Otherwise" (MOKS featuring James Arthur)	2015	Cimo Fränkel and Rik Annema
"Say You Won't Let Go"	2016	Felix Urbauer
"Safe Inside"	2016	Frank Hoffman
"Can I Be Him"	2017	Felix Urbauer
"Sun Comes Up" (Rudimental featuring James Arthur)	2017	Amos LeBlanc
"Naked"	2017	Mario Clement
"You Can Cry" (Marshmello x Juicy J featuring James Arthur)	2018	Daniel Malikyar
"You Deserve Better"	2018	Phillip R. Lopez
"Empty Space"	2018	Andzej Gavriss
"Falling like the Stars"	2019	Patrick Mason
"Treehouse"	2019	Anthony Schepperd
"You"	2019	Timon Birkhofer
"Quite Miss Home"	2019	
"Lasting Lover" (with Sigala)	2020	
"Medicine"	2021	
"September"	2021	
"Emily"	2021	
"SOS"	2021	
"Deja Vu"	2021	Dan Massie
"Ride"	2021	
"Lose My Mind" (featuring Josh Franceschi)	2022	
"A Year Ago"	2023	
"Blindside"	2023	
"Just Us"	2023	
"Homecoming"	2023	
"Sleep Walking"	2023	

== Songwriting credits ==
Song	Year	Artist	Album
"Let's Go Home Together" (with Tom Grennan)	2021	Ella Henderson	Everything I Didn't Say
