= The X Factor (British TV series) discography =

Singing-talent series on British television

The X Factor is a British television singing talent series. It was broadcast from 2004 to 2018. The winners, runners-up and other contestants of the show have seen varied levels of success, but have gone on to produce a total of 42 number ones and numerous UK chart hits. Sales figures show that artists from the show have sold around 30 million singles and over 18 million albums. One Direction have sold more than 65 million records worldwide, making them the most successful act to have ever appeared on any country's version of The X Factor and one of the best-selling boy bands of all time.

The first eleven winners of the show—Steve Brookstein, Shayne Ward, Leona Lewis, Leon Jackson, Alexandra Burke, Joe McElderry, Matt Cardle, Little Mix, James Arthur, Sam Bailey and Ben Haenow—reached the top spot with their winner's singles, whilst 2015 winner Louisa Johnson only reached number 9, 2016 winner Matt Terry reached number 3, 2017 winners Rak-Su reached number 2, and 2018 winner Dalton Harris reached number 4. The winning contestant's single from 2004 to 2010 (and again in 2013 and 2014) was released in time for the end-of-year chart battle for the UK's Christmas number one, a spot which was gained in 2005, 2006, 2007, 2008, 2010, 2013 and 2014. Brookstein and McElderry both instead claimed the New Year's number one spot a week later in 2004 and 2009 respectively, while Little Mix achieved the top spot a week earlier in 2011. In 2012, Arthur achieved the number one spot a week earlier as well, but also claimed the New Year's number one spot, making him the first (and currently only) winner to regain the top spot on the charts.

In 2008, the contestants from the fifth series released a cover version of Mariah Carey's "Hero" to raise money for the charity Help for Heroes; the single charted at number one in the United Kingdom. In 2009, the contestants of that year released a cover of Michael Jackson's "You Are Not Alone", in 2010, they released a cover of David Bowie's "Heroes", and in 2011 they released a cover of "Wishing on a Star" featuring former boyband contestants JLS and One Direction. The process was discontinued in 2012, although all winner's singles since 2012 have been released as charity singles.

== Singles ==
Artist	Series	Position in show	Song title	UK release date	UK peak chart position	UK certification award	Ref(s)
Steve Brookstein	1	Winner	"Against All Odds"	20 December 2004	1	Silver	
Steve Brookstein	1	Winner	"Fighting Butterflies"	2 October 2006	DNC	—N/a	
Steve Brookstein	1	Winner	"Don't Give Up"	13 December 2010	DNC	—N/a	
G4	1	Runners-up	"Bohemian Rhapsody"	14 March 2005	9	—N/a	
Shayne Ward	2	Winner	"That's My Goal"	21 December 2005	1	Platinum	
Shayne Ward	2	Winner	"No Promises"	10 April 2006	2	Silver	
Shayne Ward	2	Winner	"Stand by Me"	10 July 2006	14	Silver	
Shayne Ward	2	Winner	"No U Hang Up"/"If That's OK with You"	24 September 2007	2	Silver	
Shayne Ward	2	Winner	"Breathless"	19 November 2007	6	—N/a	
Shayne Ward	2	Winner	"Gotta Be Somebody"	7 November 2010	12	—N/a	
Shayne Ward	2	Winner	"My Heart Would Take You Back"	15 April 2015	DNC	—N/a	
Shayne Ward	2	Winner	"Over the Rainbow"	22 May 2020	DNC	—N/a	
Andy Abraham	2	Runner-up	"Hang Up"	27 March 2006	65	—N/a	
Andy Abraham	2	Runner-up	"December Brings Me Back to You"	11 December 2006	18	—N/a	
Andy Abraham	2	Runner-up	"Even If"	19 May 2008	67	—N/a	
Chico	2	5th	"It's Chico Time"	27 February 2006	1	—N/a	
Chico	2	5th	"D.I.S.C.O"	14 August 2006	24	—N/a	
Chico	2	5th	"Curvy Cola Bottle Body"	8 October 2007	45	—N/a	
Maria Lawson	2	8th	"Sleepwalking"	14 August 2006	20	—N/a	
Fleur East	2, 11	12th (as part of Addictiv Ladies) (2); Runner-up (11)	"Sax"	6 November 2015	3	Platinum	
Fleur East	2, 11	12th (as part of Addictiv Ladies) (2); Runner-up (11)	"More and More"	5 February 2016	186	—N/a	
Fleur East	2, 11	12th (as part of Addictiv Ladies) (2); Runner-up (11)	"Favourite Thing"	4 January 2019	80	—N/a	
Fleur East	2, 11	12th (as part of Addictiv Ladies) (2); Runner-up (11)	"Size"	18 November 2019	DNC	—N/a	
Fleur East	2, 11	12th (as part of Addictiv Ladies) (2); Runner-up (11)	"Lucky"	31 January 2020	DNC	—N/a	
Fleur East	2, 11	12th (as part of Addictiv Ladies) (2); Runner-up (11)	"Mine"	20 March 2020	DNC	—N/a	
Fleur East	2, 11	12th (as part of Addictiv Ladies) (2); Runner-up (11)	"Not Alone"	10 April 2020	DNC	—N/a	
Fleur East	2, 11	12th (as part of Addictiv Ladies) (2); Runner-up (11)	"You’re Christmas to Me"	11 December 2020	DNC	—N/a	
Fleur East	2, 11	12th (as part of Addictiv Ladies) (2); Runner-up (11)	"Count the Ways"	27 January 2023	DNC	—N/a	
Leona Lewis	3	Winner	"A Moment Like This"	17 December 2006	1	Platinum	
Leona Lewis	3	Winner	"Bleeding Love"	19 October 2007	1	3xPlatinum	
Leona Lewis	3	Winner	"Better in Time"	7 March 2008	2	Gold	
Leona Lewis	3	Winner	"Footprints in the Sand"	7 March 2008	26	Silver	
Leona Lewis	3	Winner	"Forgive Me"	3 November 2008	5	—N/a	
Leona Lewis	3	Winner	"Run"	30 November 2008	1	2xPlatinum	
Leona Lewis	3	Winner	"Happy"	8 November 2009	2	Silver	
Leona Lewis	3	Winner	"Stop Crying Your Heart Out"	9 November 2009	27	—N/a	
Leona Lewis	3	Winner	"I Got You"	21 February 2010	14	—N/a	
Leona Lewis	3	Winner	"Collide"	3 September 2011	4	Silver	
Leona Lewis	3	Winner	"Trouble"	7 October 2012	7	—N/a	
Leona Lewis	3	Winner	"Lovebird"	16 November 2012	DNC	—N/a	
Leona Lewis	3	Winner	"One More Sleep"	5 November 2013	3	2xPlatinum	
Leona Lewis	3	Winner	"Fire Under My Feet"	7 July 2015	51	—N/a	
Leona Lewis	3	Winner	"I Am"	15 July 2015	DNC	—N/a	
Leona Lewis	3	Winner	"Thunder"	24 July 2015	DNC	—N/a	
Leona Lewis	3	Winner	"You Are the Reason"	9 February 2018	43	Platinum	
Leona Lewis	3	Winner	"Solo Quiero (Somebody to Love)"	30 August 2019	DNC	—N/a	
Leona Lewis	3	Winner	"Kiss Me, It’s Christmas"	5 November 2021	87	—N/a	
Leon Jackson	4	Winner	"When You Believe"	16 December 2007	1	Gold	
Leon Jackson	4	Winner	"Don't Call This Love"	12 October 2008	3	—N/a	
Leon Jackson	4	Winner	"Creative"	15 November 2008	94	—N/a	
Same Difference	4	3rd	"We R One"	24 November 2008	13	—N/a	
Same Difference	4	3rd	"Shine On Forever (Photo Frame)"	29 August 2010	100	—N/a	
Mollie King	4	Bootcamp	"Back to You"	19 August 2016	90	—N/a	
Alexandra Burke	5	Winner	"Hallelujah"	17 December 2008	1	2xPlatinum	
Alexandra Burke	5	Winner	"Bad Boys"	12 October 2009	1	Platinum	
Alexandra Burke	5	Winner	"Broken Heels"	11 January 2010	8	Gold	
Alexandra Burke	5	Winner	"All Night Long"	3 May 2010	4	Silver	
Alexandra Burke	5	Winner	"Start Without You"	23 August 2010	1	Silver	
Alexandra Burke	5	Winner	"The Silence"	6 December 2010	16	—N/a	
Alexandra Burke	5	Winner	"Elephant"	13 March 2012	3	—N/a	
Alexandra Burke	5	Winner	"Let It Go"	27 May 2012	33	—N/a	
Alexandra Burke	5	Winner	"Silent Night"	20 November 2020	DNC	—N/a	
JLS	5	Runners-up	"Beat Again"	12 July 2009	1	Platinum	
JLS	5	Runners-up	"Everybody in Love"	1 November 2009	1	Platinum	
JLS	5	Runners-up	"One Shot"	22 February 2010	6	Gold	
JLS	5	Runners-up	"The Club Is Alive"	11 July 2010	1	Silver	
JLS	5	Runners-up	"Love You More"	14 November 2010	1	Gold	
JLS	5	Runners-up	"Eyes Wide Shut"	13 February 2011	8	Gold	
JLS	5	Runners-up	"She Makes Me Wanna"	22 July 2011	1	Gold	
JLS	5	Runners-up	"Take a Chance on Me"	4 November 2011	2	Silver	
JLS	5	Runners-up	"Wishing on a Star"	27 November 2011	1	—N/a	
JLS	5	Runners-up	"Do You Feel What I Feel?"	1 January 2012	16	—N/a	
JLS	5	Runners-up	"Proud"	16 March 2012	6	—N/a	
JLS	5	Runners-up	"Hottest Girl in the World"	21 October 2012	6	—N/a	
JLS	5	Runners-up	"Billion Lights"	15 November 2013	14	—N/a	
JLS	5	Runners-up	"Eternal Love"	3 September 2021	71	—N/a	
JLS	5	Runners-up	"Postcard"	12 November 2021	DNC	—N/a	
Aston Merrygold	5	Runners-up (as part of JLS)	"Get Stupid"	14 August 2015	28	—N/a	
Aston Merrygold	5	Runners-up (as part of JLS)	"I Ain't Missing You"	23 September 2016	126	—N/a	
Marvin Humes (as part of LuvBug)	5	Runners-up (as part of JLS)	"Resonance"	24 October 2014	12	—N/a	
Marvin Humes (as part of LuvBug)	5	Runners-up (as part of JLS)	"Revive (Say Something)"	8 February 2015	13	—N/a	
Marvin Humes (as part of LuvBug)	5	Runners-up (as part of JLS)	"Best Is Yet to Come"	21 April 2016	68	—N/a	
Eoghan Quigg	5	3rd	"28,000 Friends"	6 April 2009	96	—N/a	
Eoghan Quigg	5	3rd	"The Movie Song"	2 March 2014	DNC	—N/a	
Diana Vickers	5	4th	"Once"	19 April 2010	1	Silver	
Diana Vickers	5	4th	"The Boy Who Murdered Love"	18 July 2010	36	—N/a	
Diana Vickers	5	4th	"My Wicked Heart"	17 October 2010	13	—N/a	
Diana Vickers	5	4th	"Cinderella"	21 July 2013	76	—N/a	
Diana Vickers	5	4th	"Music to Make Boys Cry"	15 September 2013	DNC	—N/a	
Ruth Lorenzo	5	5th	"Dancing in the Rain"	18 March 2014	102	—N/a	
Laura White	5	8th	"You Should Have Known"	2 November 2009	32	—N/a	
The X Factor contestants 2008	5	All 12 contestants	"Hero"	27 October 2008	1	2xPlatinum	
Joe McElderry	6	Winner	"The Climb"	14 December 2009	1	Platinum	
Joe McElderry	6	Winner	"Ambitions"	10 October 2010	6	—N/a	
Joe McElderry	6	Winner	"Someone Wake Me Up"	5 December 2010	68	—N/a	
Joe McElderry	6	Winner	"Last Christmas"	19 December 2011	68	—N/a	
Joe McElderry	6	Winner	"Abide with Me"	14 April 2013	143	—N/a	
Joe McElderry	6	Winner	"Baby Had Your Fun"	22 January 2021	DNC	—N/a	
Olly Murs	6	Runner-up	"Please Don't Let Me Go"	29 August 2010	1	Gold	
Olly Murs	6	Runner-up	"Thinking of Me"	21 November 2010	4	Gold	
Olly Murs	6	Runner-up	"Heart on My Sleeve"	6 March 2011	20	—N/a	
Olly Murs	6	Runner-up	"Busy"	29 May 2011	45	—N/a	
Olly Murs	6	Runner-up	"Heart Skips a Beat"	21 August 2011	1	Platinum	
Olly Murs	6	Runner-up	"Dance with Me Tonight"	20 November 2011	1	2× Platinum	
Olly Murs	6	Runner-up	"Oh My Goodness"	1 April 2012	13	—N/a	
Olly Murs	6	Runner-up	"Troublemaker"	18 November 2012	1	Platinum	
Olly Murs	6	Runner-up	"Army of Two"	10 March 2013	12	Silver	
Olly Murs	6	Runner-up	"Dear Darlin'"	26 May 2013	5	Platinum	
Olly Murs	6	Runner-up	"Right Place Right Time"	25 August 2013	27	—N/a	
Olly Murs	6	Runner-up	"Inna Ninja"	10 November 2013	DNC	—N/a	
Olly Murs	6	Runner-up	"Hand on Heart"	22 November 2013	25	—N/a	
Olly Murs	6	Runner-up	"Wrapped Up"	16 November 2014	3	Platinum	
Olly Murs	6	Runner-up	"Up"	4 January 2015	4	Platinum	
Olly Murs	6	Runner-up	"Seasons"	29 March 2015	34	—N/a	
Olly Murs	6	Runner-up	"Beautiful to Me"	28 July 2015	93	—N/a	
Olly Murs	6	Runner-up	"Kiss Me"	9 October 2015	11	Gold	
Olly Murs	6	Runner-up	"You Don't Know Love"	8 July 2016	15	Platinum	
Olly Murs	6	Runner-up	"Grow Up"	7 October 2016	25	Silver	
Olly Murs	6	Runner-up	"Years & Years"	9 December 2016	83	—N/a	
Olly Murs	6	Runner-up	"Unpredictable"	2 June 2017	32	Gold	
Olly Murs	6	Runner-up	"More Mess"	4 August 2017	DNC	—N/a	
Olly Murs	6	Runner-up	"Moves"	28 September 2018	46	Silver	
Olly Murs	6	Runner-up	"Die of a Broken Heart"	7 October 2022	DNC	—N/a	
Olly Murs	6	Runner-up	"I Hate It When Your Drunk"	25 November 2022	DNC	—N/a	
Olly Murs	6	Runner-up	"Coming Off The Snow (The Miracle of Christmas)"	9 December 2022	DNC	—N/a	
Olly Murs	6	Runner-up	"I Found Her"	23 February 2023	DNC	—N/a	
Olly Murs	6	Runner-up	"Save Me"	25 July 2025	DNC	—N/a	
Olly Murs	6	Runner-up	"Bonkers"	26 September 2025	DNC	—N/a	
Olly Murs	6	Runner-up	"Run This Town"	26 September 2025	DNC	—N/a	
Olly Murs	6	Runner-up	"Christmas Starts Tonight"	1 December 2025	DNC	—N/a	
Stacey Solomon	6	3rd	"Driving Home for Christmas"	18 December 2011	27	—N/a	
Stacey Solomon	6	3rd	"Shy"	19 April 2015	DNC	—N/a	
Jedward	6	6th	"Under Pressure (Ice Ice Baby)"	5 February 2010	2	—N/a	
Jedward	6	6th	"All the Small Things"	18 July 2010	80	—N/a	
Jedward	6	6th	"Lipstick"	12 February 2011	40	—N/a	
Jedward	6	6th	"Bad Behaviour"	3 July 2011	60	—N/a	
Jedward	6	6th	"Wow Oh Wow"	20 November 2011	DNC	—N/a	
Jedward	6	6th	"Waterline"	24 February 2012	122	—N/a	
Jedward	6	6th	"Young Love"	18 June 2012	DNC	—N/a	
Jedward	6	6th	"Luminous"	15 October 2012	DNC	—N/a	
Lucie Jones	6	8th	"Never Give Up on You"	31 March 2017	73	—N/a	
The X Factor contestants 2009	6	All 12 contestants	"You Are Not Alone"	16 November 2009	1	Gold	
Matt Cardle	7	Winner	"When We Collide"	13 December 2010	1	Platinum	
Matt Cardle	7	Winner	"Run for Your Life"	10 October 2011	6	—N/a	
Matt Cardle	7	Winner	"Starlight"	4 December 2011	185	—N/a	
Matt Cardle	7	Winner	"Amazing"	19 February 2012	84	—N/a	
Matt Cardle	7	Winner	"It's Only Love"	29 October 2012	175	—N/a	
Matt Cardle	7	Winner	"Anyone Else"	31 December 2012	DNC	—N/a	
Matt Cardle	7	Winner	"Loving You"	18 August 2013	14	—N/a	
Matt Cardle	7	Winner	"When You Were My Girl"	13 October 2013	DNC	—N/a	
Matt Cardle	7	Winner	"Hit My Heart"	6 April 2014	171	—N/a	
Rebecca Ferguson	7	Runner-up	"Nothing's Real but Love"	20 November 2011	10	Silver	
Rebecca Ferguson	7	Runner-up	"Too Good to Lose"	2 March 2012	186	—N/a	
Rebecca Ferguson	7	Runner-up	"Glitter & Gold"	29 April 2012	116	—N/a	
Rebecca Ferguson	7	Runner-up	"Backtrack"	14 October 2012	15	—N/a	
Rebecca Ferguson	7	Runner-up	"I Hope"	1 December 2013	15	—N/a	
Rebecca Ferguson	7	Runner-up	"Light On"	28 December 2013	DNC	—N/a	
Rebecca Ferguson	7	Runner-up	"All That I've Got"	2 March 2014	180	—N/a	
Rebecca Ferguson	7	Runner-up	"Get Happy"	2 February 2015	DNC	—N/a	
Rebecca Ferguson	7	Runner-up	"Bones"	2 September 2016	46	—N/a	
Rebecca Ferguson	7	Runner-up	"Superwoman"	6 December 2016	95	—N/a	
Rebecca Ferguson	7	Runner-up	"Nothing Left but Family"	8 May 2020	DNC	—N/a	
One Direction	7	3rd	"What Makes You Beautiful"	11 September 2011	1	4xPlatinum	
One Direction	7	3rd	"Gotta Be You"	11 November 2011	3	Silver	
One Direction	7	3rd	"Wishing on a Star"	27 November 2011	1	—N/a	
One Direction	7	3rd	"One Thing"	6 January 2012	9	Gold	
One Direction	7	3rd	"More than This"	26 June 2012	86	—N/a	
One Direction	7	3rd	"Live While We're Young"	30 September 2012	3	Platinum	
One Direction	7	3rd	"Little Things"	11 November 2012	1	2xPlatinum	
One Direction	7	3rd	"Kiss You"	7 January 2013	9	Platinum	
One Direction	7	3rd	"One Way or Another (Teenage Kicks)"	17 February 2013	1	Platinum	
One Direction	7	3rd	"Best Song Ever"	22 July 2013	2	2xPlatinum	
One Direction	7	3rd	"Story of My Life"	25 October 2013	2	3xPlatinum	
One Direction	7	3rd	"Midnight Memories"	9 March 2014	39	Silver	
One Direction	7	3rd	"You & I"	25 May 2014	19	Platinum	
One Direction	7	3rd	"Steal My Girl"	29 September 2014	3	2xPlatinum	
One Direction	7	3rd	"Night Changes"	14 November 2014	6	Platinum	
One Direction	7	3rd	"Drag Me Down"	31 July 2015	1	2xPlatinum	
One Direction	7	3rd	"Perfect"	16 October 2015	2	2xPlatinum	
One Direction	7	3rd	"History"	6 November 2015	6	2xPlatinum	
Zayn	7	3rd (as part of One Direction)	"Pillowtalk"	29 January 2016	1	2xPlatinum	
Zayn	7	3rd (as part of One Direction)	"Back to Sleep"	26 February 2016	DNC	—N/a	
Zayn	7	3rd (as part of One Direction)	"Like I Would"	24 May 2016	30	Silver	
Zayn	7	3rd (as part of One Direction)	"Wrong"	5 June 2016	118	—N/a	
Zayn	7	3rd (as part of One Direction)	"Cruel"	15 July 2016	33	Silver	
Zayn	7	3rd (as part of One Direction)	"Freedun"	2 September 2016	DNC	—N/a	
Zayn	7	3rd (as part of One Direction)	"I Don't Wanna Live Forever"	9 December 2016	5	Platinum	
Zayn	7	3rd (as part of One Direction)	"Still Got Time"	24 March 2017	24	Gold	
Zayn	7	3rd (as part of One Direction)	"Dusk Till Dawn"	7 September 2017	5	3xPlatinum	
Zayn	7	3rd (as part of One Direction)	"Let Me"	12 April 2018	20	—N/a	
Zayn	7	3rd (as part of One Direction)	"Entertainer"	23 May 2018	95	—N/a	
Zayn	7	3rd (as part of One Direction)	"Sour Diesel"	18 July 2018	DNC	—N/a	
Zayn	7	3rd (as part of One Direction)	"Too Much"	2 August 2018	79	—N/a	
Zayn	7	3rd (as part of One Direction)	"Fingers"	18 October 2018	DNC	—N/a	
Zayn	7	3rd (as part of One Direction)	"No Candle No Light"	15 November 2018	DNC	—N/a	
Zayn	7	3rd (as part of One Direction)	"A Whole New World"	9 May 2020	68	—N/a	
Zayn	7	3rd (as part of One Direction)	"Trampoline"	26 September 2019	52	Silver	
Zayn	7	3rd (as part of One Direction)	"Rumors"	4 October 2019	DNC	—N/a	
Zayn	7	3rd (as part of One Direction)	"Flames"	15 November 2019	DNC	—N/a	
Zayn	7	3rd (as part of One Direction)	"Better"	25 September 2020	58	—N/a	
Zayn	7	3rd (as part of One Direction)	"Vibes"	8 January 2021	50	—N/a	
Zayn	7	3rd (as part of One Direction)	"Love Like This"	21 July 2023	36		
Niall Horan	7	3rd (as part of One Direction)	"This Town"	29 September 2016	9	Platinum	
Niall Horan	7	3rd (as part of One Direction)	"Slow Hands"	5 May 2017	7	2xPlatinum	
Niall Horan	7	3rd (as part of One Direction)	"Too Much to Ask"	15 September 2017	24	Gold	
Niall Horan	7	3rd (as part of One Direction)	"On the Loose"	18 February 2018	94	—N/a	
Niall Horan	7	3rd (as part of One Direction)	"Seeing Blind"	1 June 2018	DNC	—N/a	
Niall Horan	7	3rd (as part of One Direction)	"What a Time"	29 March 2019	DNC	—N/a	
Niall Horan	7	3rd (as part of One Direction)	"Nice to Meet Ya"	4 October 2019	22	Platinum	
Niall Horan	7	3rd (as part of One Direction)	"Put a Little Love on Me"	6 December 2019	DNC	Silver	
Niall Horan	7	3rd (as part of One Direction)	"No Judgement"	7 February 2020	32	Silver	
Niall Horan	7	3rd (as part of One Direction)	"Heartbreak Weather"	13 March 2020	DNC	—N/a	
Niall Horan	7	3rd (as part of One Direction)	"Black and White"	21 April 2020	91	—N/a	
Niall Horan	7	3rd (as part of One Direction)	"Moral of the Story"	11 June 2020	DNC	—N/a	
Niall Horan	7	3rd (as part of One Direction)	"Our Song"	22 May 2021	13	Platinum	
Niall Horan	7	3rd (as part of One Direction)	"Everywhere"	19 November 2021	23	—N/a	
Niall Horan	7	3rd (as part of One Direction)	"Heaven"	17 February 2023	16	—N/a	
Niall Horan	7	3rd (as part of One Direction)	"Meltdown"	28 April 2023	62	—N/a	
Louis Tomlinson	7	3rd (as part of One Direction)	"Just Hold On"	10 December 2016	2	Platinum	
Louis Tomlinson	7	3rd (as part of One Direction)	"Back to You"	21 July 2017	8	Gold	
Louis Tomlinson	7	3rd (as part of One Direction)	"Miss You"	1 December 2017	39	—N/a	
Louis Tomlinson	7	3rd (as part of One Direction)	"Two of Us"	7 March 2019	64	—N/a	
Louis Tomlinson	7	3rd (as part of One Direction)	"Kill My Mind"	5 September 2019	DNC	—N/a	
Louis Tomlinson	7	3rd (as part of One Direction)	"We Made It"	24 October 2019	DNC	—N/a	
Louis Tomlinson	7	3rd (as part of One Direction)	"Don't Let It Break Your Heart"	23 November 2019	DNC	—N/a	
Louis Tomlinson	7	3rd (as part of One Direction)	"Walls"	17 January 2020	DNC	—N/a	
Louis Tomlinson	7	3rd (as part of One Direction)	"Bigger Than Me"	1 September 2022	DNC	—N/a	
Louis Tomlinson	7	3rd (as part of One Direction)	"Out of My System"	14 October 2022	DNC	—N/a	
Louis Tomlinson	7	3rd (as part of One Direction)	"Silver Tongues"	9 November 2022	DNC	—N/a	
Louis Tomlinson	7	3rd (as part of One Direction)	"Lemonade"	30 September 2025	DNC	—N/a	
Louis Tomlinson	7	3rd (as part of One Direction)	"Palaces"	13 November 2025	DNC	—N/a	
Louis Tomlinson	7	3rd (as part of One Direction)	"Imposter"	20 January 2026	DNC	—N/a	
Harry Styles	7	3rd (as part of One Direction)	"Sign of the Times"	7 April 2017	1	3xPlatinum	
Harry Styles	7	3rd (as part of One Direction)	"Two Ghosts"	7 August 2017	58	—N/a	
Harry Styles	7	3rd (as part of One Direction)	"Kiwi"	31 October 2017	66	Gold	
Harry Styles	7	3rd (as part of One Direction)	"Lights Up"	11 October 2019	3	Platinum	
Harry Styles	7	3rd (as part of One Direction)	"Adore You"	6 December 2019	7	3xPlatinum	
Harry Styles	7	3rd (as part of One Direction)	"Falling"	28 February 2020	15	2xPlatinum	
Harry Styles	7	3rd (as part of One Direction)	"Watermelon Sugar"	28 February 2020	4	5xPlatinum	
Harry Styles	7	3rd (as part of One Direction)	"Golden"	23 October 2020	26	Platinum	
Harry Styles	7	3rd (as part of One Direction)	"Treat People with Kindness"	11 January 2021	DNC	Silver	
Harry Styles	7	3rd (as part of One Direction)	"Fine Line"	19 November 2021	DNC	Platinum	
Harry Styles	7	3rd (as part of One Direction)	"As It Was"	1 April 2022	1	5xPlatinum	
Harry Styles	7	3rd (as part of One Direction)	"Late Night Talking"	27 May 2022	2	2xPlatinum	
Harry Styles	7	3rd (as part of One Direction)	"Music for a Sushi Restaurant"	27 May 2022	3	Platinum	
Harry Styles	7	3rd (as part of One Direction)	"Matilda"	12 August 2022	63	Gold	
Liam Payne	7	3rd (as part of One Direction)	"Strip That Down"	19 May 2017	3	2xPlatinum	
Liam Payne	7	3rd (as part of One Direction)	"Get Low"	6 July 2017	26	Silver	
Liam Payne	7	3rd (as part of One Direction)	"Bedroom Floor"	20 October 2017	21	Silver	
Liam Payne	7	3rd (as part of One Direction)	"For You"	5 January 2018	8	Platinum	
Liam Payne	7	3rd (as part of One Direction)	"Familiar"	20 April 2018	14	Platinum	
Liam Payne	7	3rd (as part of One Direction)	"Polaroid"	5 October 2018	12	Gold	
Liam Payne	7	3rd (as part of One Direction)	"Stack It Up"	18 September 2019	84	—N/a	
Liam Payne	7	3rd (as part of One Direction)	"All I Want (For Christmas)"	25 October 2019	73	—N/a	
Liam Payne	7	3rd (as part of One Direction)	"Live Forever"	6 December 2019	DNC	—N/a	
Liam Payne	7	3rd (as part of One Direction)	"Midnight"	8 April 2020	DNC	—N/a	
Liam Payne	7	3rd (as part of One Direction)	"Naughty List"	30 October 2020	48	—N/a	
Liam Payne	7	3rd (as part of One Direction)	"Sunshine"	27 August 2021	DNC	—N/a	
Liam Payne	7	3rd (as part of One Direction)	"Teardrops"	1 March 2024	85	—N/a	
Cher Lloyd	7	4th	"Swagger Jagger"	31 July 2011	1	Silver	
Cher Lloyd	7	4th	"With Ur Love"	31 October 2011	4	Silver	
Cher Lloyd	7	4th	"Want U Back"	19 March 2012	25	Silver	
Cher Lloyd	7	4th	"I Wish"	3 September 2013	160	—N/a	
Cher Lloyd	7	4th	"Really Don't Care"	20 May 2014	92	—N/a	
Cher Lloyd	7	4th	"Sirens"	20 July 2014	41	—N/a	
Cher Lloyd	7	4th	"Activated"	22 July 2016	DNC	—N/a	
Cher Lloyd	7	4th	"None of My Business "	16 October 2018	DNC	—N/a	
Cher Lloyd	7	4th	"M.I.A"	11 October 2019	DNC	—N/a	
Cher Lloyd	7	4th	"Lost"	24 April 2020	DNC	—N/a	
Cher Lloyd	7	4th	"One Drink Away"	2 October 2020	DNC	—N/a	
Cher Lloyd	7	4th	"Baddest"	7 May 2021	DNC	—N/a	
Cher Lloyd	7	4th	"Head Down"	17 January 2025	DNC	—N/a	
Cher Lloyd	7	4th	"Green Light"	4 April 2025	DNC	—N/a	
Cher Lloyd	7	4th	"Sweet Devotion"	30 January 2026	DNC	—N/a	
Cher Lloyd	7	4th	"Time Feels Right"	30 October 2026	DNC	—N/a	
Mary Byrne	7	5th	"I Just Call You Mine"	4 March 2011	DNC	—N/a	
Aiden Grimshaw	7	9th	"Is This Love"	3 June 2012	35	—N/a	
Aiden Grimshaw	7	9th	"Curtain Call"	12 August 2012	49	—N/a	
The X Factor contestants 2010	7	All 16 contestants	"Heroes"	21 November 2010	1	Silver	
Little Mix	8	Winner	"Cannonball"	11 December 2011	1	Platinum	
Little Mix	8	Winner	"Wings"	26 August 2012	1	2xPlatinum	
Little Mix	8	Winner	"DNA"	11 November 2012	3	Gold	
Little Mix	8	Winner	"Change Your Life"	3 February 2013	12	Silver	
Little Mix	8	Winner	"How Ya Doin'?"	17 April 2013	16	Silver	
Little Mix	8	Winner	"Move"	25 October 2013	3	Platinum	
Little Mix	8	Winner	"Little Me"	30 December 2013	14	Silver	
Little Mix	8	Winner	"Word Up!"	16 March 2014	6	—N/a	
Little Mix	8	Winner	"Salute"	1 June 2014	6	Platinum	
Little Mix	8	Winner	"Black Magic"	21 May 2015	1	4xPlatinum	
Little Mix	8	Winner	"Love Me Like You"	25 September 2015	11	Platinum	
Little Mix	8	Winner	"Secret Love Song"	11 December 2015	6	3xPlatinum	
Little Mix	8	Winner	"Hair"	15 April 2016	11	Platinum	
Little Mix	8	Winner	"Shout Out to My Ex"	16 October 2016	1	4xPlatinum	
Little Mix	8	Winner	"Touch"	9 December 2016	4	3xPlatinum	
Little Mix	8	Winner	"No More Sad Songs"	7 March 2017	15	Platinum	
Little Mix	8	Winner	"Power"	26 May 2017	6	3xPlatinum	
Little Mix	8	Winner	"Reggaetón Lento"	18 August 2017	5	2xPlatinum	
Little Mix	8	Winner	"Only You"	22 June 2018	13	Platinum	
Little Mix	8	Winner	"Woman Like Me"	12 October 2018	2	2xPlatinum	
Little Mix	8	Winner	"Think About Us"	25 January 2019	22	Gold	
Little Mix	8	Winner	"Bounce Back"	12 June 2019	10	Silver	
Little Mix	8	Winner	"One I've Been Missing"	22 November 2019	59	—N/a	
Little Mix	8	Winner	"Break Up Song"	27 March 2020	9	Platinum	
Little Mix	8	Winner	"Holiday"	24 July 2020	15	Gold	
Little Mix	8	Winner	"Sweet Melody"	23 October 2020	1	2xPlatinum	
Little Mix	8	Winner	"No Time for Tears"	27 November 2020	19	Gold	
Little Mix	8	Winner	"Confetti"	30 April 2021	9	Platinum	
Little Mix	8	Winner	"Heartbreak Anthem"	22 May 2021	3	Platinum	
Little Mix	8	Winner	"Kiss My (Uh-Oh)"	23 July 2021	10	Platinum	
Little Mix	8	Winner	"Love (Sweet Love)"	3 September 2021	33	—N/a	
Little Mix	8	Winner	"No"	12 November 2021	35	—N/a	
Jesy Nelson	8	1st (as part of Little Mix)	"Boyz"	8 October 2021	4	—N/a	
Jesy Nelson	8	1st (as part of Little Mix)	"Bad Thing"	14 April 2023	DNC	—N/a	
Jesy Nelson	8	1st (as part of Little Mix)	"Mine"	2 August 2024	DNC	—N/a	
Leigh-Anne	8	1st (as part of Little Mix)	"Don't Say Love"	16 June 2023	11	—N/a	
Leigh-Anne	8	1st (as part of Little Mix)	"My Love"	7 September 2023	28	—N/a	
Leigh-Anne	8	1st (as part of Little Mix)	"Stealin' Love"	28 March 2024	DNC	—N/a	
Leigh-Anne	8	1st (as part of Little Mix)	"Forbidden Fruit"	3 May 2024	DNC	—N/a	
Leigh-Anne	8	1st (as part of Little Mix)	"OMG"	31 May 2024	DNC	—N/a	
Leigh-Anne	8	1st (as part of Little Mix)	"Nature"	12 June 2024	DNC	—N/a	
Leigh-Anne	8	1st (as part of Little Mix)	"Been a Minute"	18 July 2025	DNC	—N/a	
Leigh-Anne	8	1st (as part of Little Mix)	"Burnin’ Up"	21 August 2025	DNC	—N/a	
Leigh-Anne	8	1st (as part of Little Mix)	"Hello"	3 October 2025	DNC	—N/a	
Leigh-Anne	8	1st (as part of Little Mix)	"Dead and Gone"	17 October 2025	DNC	—N/a	
Leigh-Anne	8	1st (as part of Little Mix)	"Friends"	21 November 2025	DNC	—N/a	
Leigh-Anne	8	1st (as part of Little Mix)	"Most Wanted"	16 January 2026	DNC	—N/a	
Leigh-Anne	8	1st (as part of Little Mix)	"Tight Up Skirt"	22 May 2026	DNC	—N/a	
Perrie	8	1st (as part of Little Mix)	"Forget About Us"	12 April 2024	10	—N/a	
Perrie	8	1st (as part of Little Mix)	"Tears"	21 June 2024	69	—N/a	
Perrie	8	1st (as part of Little Mix)	"You Go Your Way"	4 October 2024	52	—N/a	
Perrie	8	1st (as part of Little Mix)	"If He Wanted to He Would"	22 August 2025	44	—N/a	
Perrie	8	1st (as part of Little Mix)	"Miss You"	19 September 2025	DNC	—N/a	
Perrie	8	1st (as part of Little Mix)	"Rocket Scientist"	26 September 2025	DNC	—N/a	
Perrie	8	1st (as part of Little Mix)	"Passenger Princess"	29 May 2026	DNC	—N/a	
JADE	8	1st (as part of Little Mix)	"Angel of My Dreams"	19 July 2024	7	Platinum	
JADE	8	1st (as part of Little Mix)	"Fantasy"	18 October 2024	52	—N/a	
JADE	8	1st (as part of Little Mix)	"FUFN (Fuck You for Now)"	14 March 2025	25	—N/a	
JADE	8	1st (as part of Little Mix)	"Plastic Box"	20 July 2025	44	—N/a	
JADE	8	1st (as part of Little Mix)	"Gossip"	23 August 2025	DNC	—N/a	
JADE	8	1st (as part of Little Mix)	"Unconditional"	3 October 2025	51	—N/a	
JADE	8	1st (as part of Little Mix)	"Church"	5 December 2025	DNC	—N/a	
Marcus Collins	8	Runner-up	"Seven Nation Army"	4 March 2012	9	—N/a	
Marcus Collins	8	Runner-up	"Mercy"	10 June 2012	194	—N/a	
Amelia Lily	8	3rd	"You Bring Me Joy"	9 September 2012	2	Silver	
Amelia Lily	8	3rd	"Shut Up (And Give Me Whatever You Got)"	18 January 2013	11	—N/a	
Amelia Lily	8	3rd	"Party Over"	21 April 2013	40	—N/a	
Amelia Lily	8	3rd	"California"	5 September 2014	83	—N/a	
Misha B	8	4th	"Home Run"	15 July 2012	11	—N/a	
Misha B	8	4th	"Do You Think of Me?"	4 November 2012	9	—N/a	
Misha B	8	4th	"Here's to Everything (Ooh La La)"	11 May 2013	35	—N/a	
Janet Devlin	8	5th	"Wonderful"	13 November 2013	DNC	—N/a	
Frankie Cocozza	8	8th	"She's Got a Motorcycle"	12 November 2012	89	—N/a	
The X Factor contestants 2011 featuring JLS and One Direction	8	All 16 contestants	"Wishing on a Star"	27 November 2011	1	—N/a	
James Arthur	9	Winner	"Impossible"	9 December 2012	1	3xPlatinum	
James Arthur	9	Winner	"You're Nobody 'til Somebody Loves You"	20 October 2013	2	Silver	
James Arthur	9	Winner	"Wrecking Ball"	20 October 2013	97	—N/a	
James Arthur	9	Winner	"Recovery"	15 December 2013	19	—N/a	
James Arthur	9	Winner	"Get Down"	3 March 2014	96	—N/a	
James Arthur	9	Winner	"Say You Won't Let Go"	9 September 2016	1	6xPlatinum	
James Arthur	9	Winner	"Safe Inside"	10 February 2017	31	Gold	
James Arthur	9	Winner	"Can I Be Him"	15 April 2017	69	Platinum	
James Arthur	9	Winner	"Sun Comes Up"	16 June 2017	6	Platinum	
James Arthur	9	Winner	"Naked"	24 November 2017	11	Platinum	
James Arthur	9	Winner	"You Deserve Better"	1 June 2018	53	Silver	
James Arthur	9	Winner	"Empty Space"	19 October 2018	27	Platinum	
James Arthur	9	Winner	"Rewrite the Stars"	16 November 2018	7	Platinum	
James Arthur	9	Winner	"The Power of Love"	2 December 2018	4	—N/a	
James Arthur	9	Winner	"Nobody"	1 January 2019	57	Silver	
James Arthur	9	Winner	"Falling Like the Stars"	10 May 2019	25	Gold	
James Arthur	9	Winner	"Treehouse"	6 September 2019	DNC	—N/a	
James Arthur	9	Winner	"Quite Miss Home"	18 October 2019	77	Silver	
James Arthur	9	Winner	"Lasting Lover"	4 September 2020	10	Gold	
James Arthur	9	Winner	"Train Wreck"	7 November 2020	16	Platinum	
James Arthur	9	Winner	"Medicine"	5 March 2021	41	—N/a	
James Arthur	9	Winner	"September"	11 June 2021	55	—N/a	
James Arthur	9	Winner	"Emily"	10 July 2021	82	—N/a	
James Arthur	9	Winner	"Christmas Bells"	3 December 2021	DNC	—N/a	
James Arthur	9	Winner	"Lose My Mind"	3 February 2022	DNC	—N/a	
James Arthur	9	Winner	"Questions"	3 June 2022	DNC	—N/a	
James Arthur	9	Winner	"Lose You"	11 November 2022	DNC	—N/a	
James Arthur	9	Winner	"Heartbeat"	2 December 2022	DNC	—N/a	
James Arthur	9	Winner	"Work With My Love"	13 January 2023	DNC	—N/a	
James Arthur	9	Winner	"A Year Ago"	12 May 2023	91	—N/a	
James Arthur	9	Winner	"Blindslide"	4 August 2023	DNC	—N/a	
James Arthur	9	Winner	"Just Us"	6 October 2023	81	—N/a	
James Arthur	9	Winner	"Homecoming"	24 November 2023	DNC	—N/a	
James Arthur	9	Winner	"Sleepwalking"	15 December 2023	DNC	—N/a	
James Arthur	9	Winner	"Bitter Sweet Love"	12 January 2024	DNC	—N/a	
James Arthur	9	Winner	"From The Jump"	19 April 2024	DNC	—N/a	
James Arthur	9	Winner	"ADHD"	22 November 2024	DNC	—N/a	
James Arthur	9	Winner	"Celebrate"	17 January 2025	DNC	—N/a	
James Arthur	9	Winner	"Embers"	14 February 2025	DNC	—N/a	
James Arthur	9	Winner	"KARAOKE"	7 March 2025	DNC	—N/a	
James Arthur	9	Winner	"Cruel"	25 April 2025	DNC	—N/a	
James Arthur	9	Winner	"Waste My Tears"	18 September 2026	TBC	—N/a	
Jahméne Douglas	9	Runner-up	"Titanium"	22 July 2013	94	—N/a	
Jahméne Douglas	9	Runner-up	"Forever Young"	4 November 2013	DNC	—N/a	
Union J	9	4th	"Carry You"	2 June 2013	6	—N/a	
Union J	9	4th	"Beautiful Life"	21 October 2013	8	—N/a	
Union J	9	4th	"Loving You Is Easy"	15 December 2013	173	—N/a	
Union J	9	4th	"Tonight (We Live Forever)"	16 August 2014	9	—N/a	
Union J	9	4th	"You Got It All"	28 November 2014	2	—N/a	
Ella Henderson	9	6th	"Ghost"	8 June 2014	1	3xPlatinum	
Ella Henderson	9	6th	"Glow"	5 October 2014	7	Silver	
Ella Henderson	9	6th	"Yours"	30 November 2014	16	Platinum	
Ella Henderson	9	6th	"Mirror Man"	8 March 2015	96	—N/a	
Ella Henderson	9	6th	"Glitterball"	24 July 2015	4	Gold	
Ella Henderson	9	6th	"Here for You"	4 September 2015	18	Silver	
Ella Henderson	9	6th	"Glorious"	13 September 2019	DNC	—N/a	
Ella Henderson	9	6th	"Young"	11 October 2019	DNC	—N/a	
Ella Henderson	9	6th	"This Is Real"	21 October 2019	9	Platinum	
Ella Henderson	9	6th	"We Got Love"	1 November 2019	42	Gold	
Ella Henderson	9	6th	"Young"	21 November 2019	DNC	—N/a	
Ella Henderson	9	6th	"Hold Me Close"	26 March 2020	DNC	—N/a	
Ella Henderson	9	6th	"Take Care of You"	12 June 2020	50	Silver	
Ella Henderson	9	6th	"Lighter"	24 July 2020	3	Platinum	
Ella Henderson	9	6th	"Dream on Me"	2 October 2020	DNC	—N/a	
Ella Henderson	9	6th	"Blame It on the Mistletoe"	4 December 2020	DNC	—N/a	
Ella Henderson	9	6th	"Let's Go Home Together"	19 February 2021	10	Platinum	
Ella Henderson	9	6th	"Risk It All"	20 August 2021	100	—N/a	
Ella Henderson	9	6th	"Hurricane"	11 September 2021	DNC	—N/a	
Ella Henderson	9	6th	"Brave"	20 January 2022	42	Silver	
Ella Henderson	9	6th	"Crazy What Love Can Do"	8 April 2022	5	Gold	
Ella Henderson	9	6th	"21 Reasons"	29 April 2022	9	Platinum	
Ella Henderson	9	6th	"Heartstrings"	9 September 2022	DNC	—N/a	
Ella Henderson	9	6th	"React"	13 January 2023	4	Platinum	
Ella Henderson	9	6th	"I Go Dancing"	20 January 2023	DNC	—N/a	
Ella Henderson	9	6th	"No Sleep"	17 March 2023	DNC	—N/a	
Ella Henderson	9	6th	"Like I Used To"	28 April 2023	DNC	—N/a	
Ella Henderson	9	6th	"0800 Heaven"	9 June 2023	9	—N/a	
Ella Henderson	9	6th	"Lifeline"	28 April 2023	DNC	—N/a	
Ella Henderson	9	6th	"Rest Of Our Lives"	27 October 2023	DNC	—N/a	
Ella Henderson	9	6th	"Alibi"	12 January 2024	10	Platinum	
Ella Henderson	9	6th	"Mamma You Were Right"	8 March 2024	DNC	—N/a	
Ella Henderson	9	6th	"Under The Sun"	31 May 2024	DNC	—N/a	
Ella Henderson	9	6th	"Filthy Rich"	4 October 2024	58	—N/a	
Ella Henderson	9	6th	"One Door Closes"	21 March 2025	DNC	—N/a	
Ella Henderson	9	6th	"Me & You"	16 May 2025	DNC	—N/a	
Lucy Spraggan	9	7th	"Lighthouse"	27 July 2013	26	—N/a	
Lucy Spraggan	9	7th	"Last Night (Beer Fear)"	29 September 2013	11	—N/a	
Lucy Spraggan	9	7th	"Tea and Toast"	19 October 2013	50	—N/a	
Lucy Spraggan	9	7th	"All I Want for Christmas Is You"	3 December 2021	DNC	—N/a	
Sam Bailey	10	Winner	"Skyscraper"	28 December 2013	1	Silver	
Sam Bailey	10	Winner	"Sing My Heart Out"	9 September 2016	DNC	—N/a	
Sam Bailey	10	Winner	"Black Velvet"	6 August 2021	DNC	—N/a	
Nicholas McDonald	10	Runner-up	"Answerphone"	16 March 2014	73	—N/a	
Luke Friend	10	3rd	"Hole in My Heart"	29 March 2015	40	—N/a	
Rough Copy	10	4th	"Street Love"	29 June 2014	192	—N/a	
Sam Callahan	10	7th	"Burns Like Fire"	20 October 2017	DNC	—N/a	
Kingsland Road	10	9th	"Dirty Dancer"	10 August 2014	85	—N/a	
Karen Harding	10	Bootcamp	"Say Something"	7 February 2015	7	—N/a	
Karen Harding	10	Bootcamp	"Feel Good (It's Alright)"	14 August 2015	76	—N/a	
Karen Harding	10	Bootcamp	"New Love"	14 August 2015	DNC	—N/a	
Karen Harding	10	Bootcamp	"Open My Eyes"	8 January 2016	DNC	—N/a	
Karen Harding	10	Bootcamp	"Like I Can"	19 August 2016	DNC	—N/a	
Karen Harding	10	Bootcamp	"Sweet Lies"	9 September 2016	DNC	—N/a	
Karen Harding	10	Bootcamp	"Good For Me"	11 November 2016	DNC	—N/a	
Karen Harding	10	Bootcamp	"Gun Shy"	3 February 2017	DNC	—N/a	
Karen Harding	10	Bootcamp	"Down"	12 May 2017	DNC	—N/a	
Karen Harding	10	Bootcamp	"The Weekend"	23 June 2017	DNC	—N/a	
Karen Harding	10	Bootcamp	"More & More"	28 July 2017	73	—N/a	
Karen Harding	10	Bootcamp	"Runway"	15 March 2018	DNC	—N/a	
Karen Harding	10	Bootcamp	"Picture"	25 July 2018	DNC	—N/a	
Karen Harding	10	Bootcamp	"Stay"	15 November 2018	DNC	—N/a	
Karen Harding	10	Bootcamp	"You Already Know"	5 April 2019	DNC	—N/a	
Karen Harding	10	Bootcamp	"All For You"	26 April 2019	DNC	—N/a	
Karen Harding	10	Bootcamp	"I Don’t Need Love"	13 September 2019	DNC	—N/a	
Karen Harding	10	Bootcamp	"It Must Have Been Love"	5 February 2020	DNC	—N/a	
Karen Harding	10	Bootcamp	"Rely"	21 February 2020	DNC	—N/a	
Karen Harding	10	Bootcamp	"Undo My Heart"	12 June 2020	DNC	—N/a	
Karen Harding	10	Bootcamp	"The Best"	30 April 2021	DNC	—N/a	
Karen Harding	10	Bootcamp	"Worship You"	14 April 2023	DNC	—N/a	
Karen Harding	10	Bootcamp	"Bring Me Joy"	21 June 2024	63	—N/a	
Megan McKenna	10, Celebrity	Bootcamp (10); Winner (Celebrity)	"High Heeled Shoes"	6 September 2017	43	—N/a	
Megan McKenna	10, Celebrity	Bootcamp (10); Winner (Celebrity)	"Far Cry from Love"	6 September 2017	53	—N/a	
Megan McKenna	10, Celebrity	Bootcamp (10); Winner (Celebrity)	"History"	20 March 2018	DNC	—N/a	
Megan McKenna	10, Celebrity	Bootcamp (10); Winner (Celebrity)	"Everything But You"	13 July 2018	DNC	—N/a	
Megan McKenna	10, Celebrity	Bootcamp (10); Winner (Celebrity)	"It Must Have Been Love (Christmas for the Broken Hearted)"	30 November 2019	DNC	—N/a	
Megan McKenna	10, Celebrity	Bootcamp (10); Winner (Celebrity)	"This"	19 February 2021	DNC	—N/a	
Megan McKenna	10, Celebrity	Bootcamp (10); Winner (Celebrity)	"Ruin Your Night"	28 May 2021	DNC	—N/a	
Megan McKenna	10, Celebrity	Bootcamp (10); Winner (Celebrity)	"Won’t Go Back Again"	24 September 2021	DNC	—N/a	
Megan McKenna	10, Celebrity	Bootcamp (10); Winner (Celebrity)	"Family at Christmas"	19 November 2021	DNC	—N/a	
Megan McKenna	10, Celebrity	Bootcamp (10); Winner (Celebrity)	"Baby Talk"	24 June 2022	DNC	—N/a	
Megan McKenna	10, Celebrity	Bootcamp (10); Winner (Celebrity)	"Confetti"	1 July 2022	DNC	—N/a	
Megan McKenna	10, Celebrity	Bootcamp (10); Winner (Celebrity)	"DNA"	22 July 2022	DNC	—N/a	
Megan McKenna	10, Celebrity	Bootcamp (10); Winner (Celebrity)	"Sinking Boats"	29 July 2022	DNC	—N/a	
Megan McKenna	10, Celebrity	Bootcamp (10); Winner (Celebrity)	"Single"	5 August 2022	DNC	—N/a	
Megan McKenna	10, Celebrity	Bootcamp (10); Winner (Celebrity)	"Swan Lake"	19 August 2022	DNC	—N/a	
Megan McKenna	10, Celebrity	Bootcamp (10); Winner (Celebrity)	"Heart’s Letting Go"	2 September 2022	DNC	—N/a	
Megan McKenna	10, Celebrity	Bootcamp (10); Winner (Celebrity)	"Stronger"	16 September 2022	DNC	—N/a	
Megan McKenna	10, Celebrity	Bootcamp (10); Winner (Celebrity)	"The Good, The Bad and The Bitch"	30 September 2022	DNC	—N/a	
Megan McKenna	10, Celebrity	Bootcamp (10); Winner (Celebrity)	"Too Late"	14 October 2022	DNC	—N/a	
Megan McKenna	10, Celebrity	Bootcamp (10); Winner (Celebrity)	"Dear Mr Right"	21 October 2022	DNC	—N/a	
Megan McKenna	10, Celebrity	Bootcamp (10); Winner (Celebrity)	"Vulnerable"	4 November 2022	DNC	—N/a	
Megan McKenna	10, Celebrity	Bootcamp (10); Winner (Celebrity)	"Little Lies"	18 November 2022	DNC	—N/a	
Megan McKenna	10, Celebrity	Bootcamp (10); Winner (Celebrity)	"Crazy Life"	2 December 2022	DNC	—N/a	
Ben Haenow	11	Winner	"Something I Need"	14 December 2014	1	Gold	
Ben Haenow	11	Winner	"Second Hand Heart"	16 October 2015	21	Silver	
Andrea Faustini	11	3rd	"Per Me E Per Te"	4 January 2012	DNC	—N/a	
Andrea Faustini	11	3rd	"Give a Little Love"	16 August 2015	DNC	—N/a	
Stereo Kicks	11	5th	"Love Me So"	21 June 2015	31	—N/a	
Only The Young	11	7th	"I Do"	7 August 2015	53	—N/a	
Ella Mai	11	Bootcamp	"Boo'd Up"	26 April 2018	52	Silver	
Ella Mai	11	Bootcamp	"Trip"	3 August 2018	47	Silver	
Louisa Johnson	12	Winner	"Forever Young"	13 December 2015	9	—N/a	
Louisa Johnson	12	Winner	"Tears"	27 May 2016	5	Platinum	
Louisa Johnson	12	Winner	"So Good"	28 October 2016	13	Gold	
Louisa Johnson	12	Winner	"Best Behaviour"	10 March 2017	48	Silver	
Louisa Johnson	12	Winner	"Unpredictable"	2 June 2017	32	Gold	
Louisa Johnson	12	Winner	"YES"	16 March 2018	65	—N/a	
Louisa Johnson	12	Winner	"Between You & Me"	10 August 2018	DNC	—N/a	
Louisa Johnson	12	Winner	"Here We Go Again"	29 March 2019	96	—N/a	
Louisa Johnson	12	Winner	"Ain't Got You"	28 June 2019	DNC	—N/a	
Louisa Johnson	12	Winner	"Like I Love Me"	17 January 2020	DNC	—N/a	
Louisa Johnson	12	Winner	"Always Be There"	2 September 2022	DNC	—N/a	
Louisa Johnson	12	Winner	"Who You Are"	21 June 2024	DNC	—N/a	
Louisa Johnson	12	Winner	"beauty out of the ashes"	6 June 2025	DNC	—N/a	
Reggie 'n' Bollie	12	Runners-Up	"New Girl"	20 May 2016	26	—N/a	
Matt Terry	13	Winner	"When Christmas Comes Around"	11 December 2016	3	Silver	
Matt Terry	13	Winner	"Subeme La Radio"	21 July 2017	10	—N/a	
Matt Terry	13	Winner	"Sucker for You"	13 October 2017	51	—N/a	
Matt Terry	13	Winner	"Try"	10 February 2018	DNC	—N/a	
Matt Terry	13	Winner	"Sober"	9 May 2019	DNC	—N/a	
Matt Terry	13	Winner	"You don’t know nothing"	13 October 2023	DNC	—N/a	
Matt Terry	13	Winner	"Ghost of me"	9 February 2024	DNC	—N/a	
Matt Terry	13	Winner	"His car"	22 March 2024	DNC	—N/a	
Matt Terry	13	Winner	"Boujee"	21 June 2024	DNC	—N/a	
Matt Terry	13	Winner	"SUPERGLUE!"	7 November 2025	DNC	—N/a	
Matt Terry	13	Winner	"Skittles"	13 March 2026	DNC	—N/a	
Matt Terry	13	Winner	"Karma"	17 April 2026	DNC	—N/a	
Saara Aalto	13	Runner-up	"Monsters"	8 February 2018	DNC	—N/a	
Saara Aalto	13	Runner-up	"Queens"	22 February 2018	DNC	—N/a	
Saara Aalto	13	Runner-up	"Domino"	15 February 2018	DNC	—N/a	
Saara Aalto	13	Runner-up	"Dance!!!"	17 June 2018	DNC	—N/a	
Saara Aalto	13	Runner-up	"Let It Go"	18 January 2019	DNC	—N/a	
5 After Midnight	13	3rd	"Up in Here"	2 June 2017	67	—N/a	
Emily Middlemas	13	4th	"Lost & Found"	29 August 2017	DNC	—N/a	
Emily Middlemas	13	4th	"Layla"	16 March 2018	DNC	—N/a	
Emily Middlemas	13	4th	"Habit"	7 August 2018	DNC	—N/a	
Emily Middlemas	13	4th	"Broken Record"	30 September 2018	DNC	—N/a	
Emily Middlemas	13	4th	"A Little Bit"	23 August 2019	DNC	—N/a	
Emily Middlemas	13	4th	"Changes"	30 September 2019	DNC	—N/a	
Emily Middlemas	13	4th	"Plastic Knife"	11 October 2019	DNC	—N/a	
Honey G	13	5th	"The Honey G Show"	23 December 2016	149	—N/a	
Honey G	13	5th	"Hit You With The Honey G"	30 June 2017	DNC	—N/a	
Ryan Lawrie	13	6th	"Perfect Picture"	24 August 2017	DNC	—N/a	
Ryan Lawrie	13	6th	"If Only"	26 January 2018	DNC	—N/a	
Sam Lavery	13	7th	"Walk Away"	19 May 2017	DNC	—N/a	
Sam Lavery	13	7th	"Beat Of You"	13 August 2017	DNC	—N/a	
Sam Lavery	13	7th	"For the Night"	13 April 2018	DNC	—N/a	
Sam Lavery	13	7th	"Bad Boys"	6 July 2018	DNC	—N/a	
Sam Lavery	13	7th	"What You Do"	18 January 2019	DNC	—N/a	
Sam Lavery	13	7th	"Done"	31 May 2019	DNC	—N/a	
Four of Diamonds	13	8th	"Name On It"	14 June 2018	DNC	—N/a	
Four of Diamonds	13	8th	"Stupid Things"	28 August 2018	DNC	—N/a	
Four of Diamonds	13	8th	"Blind"	30 November 2018	DNC	—N/a	
Four of Diamonds	13	8th	"Walk Away"	17 May 2019	DNC	—N/a	
Four of Diamonds	13	8th	"Eating Me Up"	19 September 2019	DNC	—N/a	
Four of Diamonds	13	8th	"Long Way To Go"	31 October 2019	DNC	—N/a	
Four of Diamonds	13	8th	"Let Me Love You"	7 February 2020	DNC	—N/a	
Four of Diamonds	13	8th	"Superstar"	27 March 2020	DNC	—N/a	
Relley C	13	10th	"Unruly"	1 June 2017	DNC	—N/a	
Relley C	13	10th	"Tell Me That"	17 November 2017	DNC	—N/a	
Caitlyn Vanbeck	13	Judges Houses	"I’m Sorry"	28 May 2018	DNC	—N/a	
Caitlyn Vanbeck	13	Judges Houses	"Break Your Heart"	7 September 2018	DNC	—N/a	
Caitlyn Vanbeck	13	Judges Houses	"Jolene"	6 October 2023	DNC	—N/a	
Rak-Su	14	Winner	"Dimelo"	3 December 2017	2	—N/a	
Rak-Su	14	Winner	"Pyro Ting"	29 June 2018	DNC	—N/a	
Rak-Su	14	Winner	"I Want You to Freak"	28 September 2018	39	—N/a	
Rak-Su	14	Winner	"Yours or Mine"	12 April 2019	DNC	—N/a	
Rak-Su	14	Winner	"Rotate (Clockwise)"	5 July 2019	DNC	—N/a	
Rak-Su	14	Winner	"La Bomba"	8 November 2019	DNC	—N/a	
Rak-Su	14	Winner	"Girl"	6 December 2019	DNC	—N/a	
Rak-Su	14	Winner	"Palm Trees"	28 May 2020	DNC	—N/a	
Rak-Su	14	Winner	"Who Am I? (Black Lives Matter)"	3 July 2020	DNC	—N/a	
Rak-Su	14	Winner	"Girls Like You"	6 November 2020	DNC	—N/a	
Rak-Su	14	Winner	"No Contest"	11 December 2020	DNC	—N/a	
Rak-Su	14	Winner	"Left Right"	22 January 2021	DNC	—N/a	
Rak-Su	14	Winner	"Tongue Tied"	15 May 2021	DNC	—N/a	
Rak-Su	14	Winner	"Statement"	12 August 2021	DNC	—N/a	
Rak-Su	14	Winner	"Over & Over"	27 August 2021	DNC	—N/a	
Rak-Su	14	Winner	"Catching a Vibe"	1 October 2021	DNC	—N/a	
Rak-Su	14	Winner	"Temporary Love"	3 March 2022	DNC	—N/a	
Rak-Su	14	Winner	"Just a Friend"	25 March 2022	DNC	—N/a	
Rak-Su	14	Winner	"Neymar"	25 November 2022	DNC	—N/a	
Rak-Su	14	Winner	"Role Play"	17 July 2024	DNC	—N/a	
Rak-Su	14	Winner	"Check For Me"	24 July 2024	DNC	—N/a	
Rak-Su	14	Winner	"Medina"	1 August 2024	DNC	—N/a	
Rak-Su	14	Winner	"Close Your Eyes"	7 August 2024	DNC	—N/a	
Rak-Su	14	Winner	"F With You"	15 August 2024	DNC	—N/a	
Rak-Su	14	Winner	"Masterpiece"	15 October 2024	DNC	—N/a	
Rak-Su	14	Winner	"Another Lover"	15 October 2024	DNC	—N/a	
Rak-Su	14	Winner	"Special One"	21 November 2024	DNC	—N/a	
Rak-Su	14	Winner	"Translate"	27 November 2024	DNC	—N/a	
Rak-Su	14	Winner	"Cyclone"	27 December 2024	DNC	—N/a	
Rak-Su	14	Winner	"What You Like"	17 January 2025	DNC	—N/a	
Rak-Su	14	Winner	"Patience"	7 February 2025	DNC	—N/a	
Rak-Su	14	Winner	"Eastside"	14 February 2025	DNC	—N/a	
Rak-Su	14	Winner	"Tropicana"	26 February 2025	DNC	—N/a	
Rak-Su	14	Winner	"Top Floor"	12 March 2025	DNC	—N/a	
Rak-Su	14	Winner	"Bella"	4 April 2025	DNC	—N/a	
Rak-Su	14	Winner	"Stay With Me"	28 May 2025	DNC	—N/a	
Rak-Su	14	Winner	"Proud of You"	13 November 2025	DNC	—N/a	
Rak-Su	14	Winner	"Remind Me How to Love"	30 January 2026	DNC	—N/a	
Rak-Su	14	Winner	"Pain Away"	20 March 2026	DNC	—N/a	
Rak-Su	14	Winner	"Tyla"	25 June 2026	DNC	—N/a	
Rak-Su	14	Winner	"Kwn"	25 June 2026	DNC	—N/a	
Myles	14	1st (as part of Rak-Su)	"Old Fashioned"	10 March 2022	DNC	—N/a	
Myles	14	1st (as part of Rak-Su)	"Crazy"	8 April 2022	DNC	—N/a	
Myles	14	1st (as part of Rak-Su)	"Special One"	21 November 2024	DNC	—N/a	
Grace Davies	14	2nd	"Invisible"	31 January 2020	DNC	—N/a	
Grace Davies	14	2nd	"Addicted to Blue"	20 March 2020	DNC	—N/a	
Grace Davies	14	2nd	"Amsterdam"	1 May 2020	DNC	—N/a	
Grace Davies	14	2nd	"Just a Girl"	26 June 2020	DNC	—N/a	
Grace Davies	14	2nd	"I Met a Boy Online"	19 February 2021	DNC	—N/a	
Grace Davies	14	2nd	"Iris"	26 March 2021	DNC	—N/a	
Grace Davies	14	2nd	"Testosterone"	28 May 2021	DNC	—N/a	
Grace Davies	14	2nd	"Toothbrush"	23 July 2021	DNC	—N/a	
Grace Davies	14	2nd	"Used to You"	27 August 2021	DNC	—N/a	
Grace Davies	14	2nd	"Roots"	8 October 2021	89	—N/a	
Grace Davies	14	2nd	"Wolves"	1 July 2022	DNC	—N/a	
Grace Davies	14	2nd	"Already Gone"	19 August 2022	DNC	—N/a	
Grace Davies	14	2nd	"Breathe"	14 October 2022	DNC	—N/a	
Grace Davies	14	2nd	"Illuminate"	18 April 2024	DNC	—N/a	
Grace Davies	14	2nd	"A Wonderful, Boring, Normal Life"	13 September 2024	DNC	—N/a	
Grace Davies	14	2nd	"Another Night"	1 November 2024	DNC	—N/a	
Grace Davies	14	2nd	"The 25th"	6 December 2024	DNC	—N/a	
Grace Davies	14	2nd	"It Ain’t Christmas (If You’re Not With Me)"	6 December 2024	DNC	—N/a	
Grace Davies	14	2nd	"Do Or Die"	14 February 2025	DNC	—N/a	
Grace Davies	14	2nd	"MDE"	28 March 2025	DNC	—N/a	
Grace Davies	14	2nd	"Super Love Me"	23 May 2025	DNC	—N/a	
Grace Davies	14	2nd	"Butterflies"	27 February 2026	DNC	—N/a	
Holly Tandy	14	7	"Only for Tonight"	6 December 2018	DNC	—N/a	
Holly Tandy	14	7	"Small Talk"	5 November 2019	DNC	—N/a	
Molly Hocking	14	Bootcamp	"I'll Never Love Again"	6 April 2019	73	—N/a	
Molly Hocking	14	Bootcamp	"After the Night Before"	6 November 2020	DNC	—N/a	
Molly Hocking	14	Bootcamp	"We Can Have the World Tonight"	28 May 2021	DNC	—N/a	
Molly Hocking	14	Bootcamp	"Alive"	31 December 2021	DNC	—N/a	
Molly Hocking	14	Bootcamp	"Bones"	22 June 2022	DNC	—N/a	
Molly Hocking	14	Bootcamp	"You Can’t Hold Me Down"	21 July 2024	DNC	—N/a	
Molly Hocking	14	Bootcamp	"The Upside"	18 October 2024	DNC	—N/a	
Molly Hocking	14	Bootcamp	"Did You Want It At All?"	15 November 2024	DNC	—N/a	
Molly Hocking	14	Bootcamp	"History Repeating"	12 September 2025	DNC	—N/a	
Molly Hocking	14	Bootcamp	"I’d Rather Lie"	15 January 2026	DNC	—N/a	
Molly Hocking	14	Bootcamp	"Wait For Me"	10 April 2026	DNC	—N/a	
Dalton Harris	15	Winner	"The Power of Love"	2 December 2018	4	—N/a	
Dalton Harris	15	Winner	"Cry"	15 December 2019	DNC	—N/a	
Scarlett Lee	15	Runners-up	"Love Shy"	26 August 2022	DNC	—N/a	
Scarlett Lee	15	Runners-up	"My Christmas Wish"	25 November 2022	DNC	—N/a	
Scarlett Lee	15	Runners-up	"Hands of Time (My Oh My)"	9 February 2024	DNC	—N/a	
Scarlett Lee	15	Runners-up	"One For You"	16 February 2024	DNC	—N/a	
Brendan Murray	15	5th	"If I'm Honest"	19 April 2019	DNC	—N/a	
Shan Ako	15	7th	"The Silence"	22 March 2019	DNC	—N/a	
Shan Ako	15	7th	"Get Back"	3 May 2019	DNC	—N/a	
Shan Ako	15	7th	"Beautiful I Am"	25 October 2019	DNC	—N/a	
Shan Ako	15	7th	"God’s Best"	25 March 2022	DNC	—N/a	
United Vibe	15	12th	"Ain't It Funny"	2 May 2019	DNC	—N/a	
United Vibe	15	12th	"Esta Noche"	29 August 2019	DNC	—N/a	
United Vibe	15	12th	"Sticks and Stones and Mobile Phones"	12 November 2019	DNC	—N/a	
Olatunji Yearwood	15	16th	"Start the Show"	24 May 2019	DNC	—N/a	
Angel22	Celebrity	4th	"Free Hugs"	24 September 2021	DNC	—N/a	
Wes Nelson	Celebrity	8th (as part of No Love Lost)	"See Nobody"	17 September 2020	3	Platinum	
Wes Nelson	Celebrity	8th (as part of No Love Lost)	"Nice to Meet Ya"	1 April 2021	36	Silver	
Wes Nelson	Celebrity	8th (as part of No Love Lost)	"Drive"	30 August 2021	17	Silver	
Wes Nelson	Celebrity	8th (as part of No Love Lost)	"Say Nothing"	22 September 2021	DNC	—N/a	
Wes Nelson	Celebrity	8th (as part of No Love Lost)	"Abracadabra"	9 February 2024	37	—N/a	
Wes Nelson	Celebrity	8th (as part of No Love Lost)	"Yellow"	31 December 2023	DNC	—N/a	
Samira Mighty	Celebrity	8th (as part of No Love Lost)	"I Love Your Smile"	7 July 2022	DNC	—N/a	
Samira Mighty	Celebrity	8th (as part of No Love Lost)	"Like This, Like That"	16 February 2023	DNC	—N/a	
Samira Mighty	Celebrity	8th (as part of No Love Lost)	"That's Not What My Friends Say"	27 April 2023	DNC	—N/a	
The X Factor Celebrities finalists 2019	Celebrity	All Celebrity finalists	"Run"	30 November 2019	87	—N/a	
RLY	The Band	Winner	"Love Me Or Not"	3 August 2023	DNC	—N/a	
RLY	The Band	Winner	"Superpower"	21 September 2023	DNC	—N/a	
RLY	The Band	Winner	"Safe & Sound"	9 February 2024	DNC	—N/a	
RLY	The Band	Winner	"Ring the Alarm"	8 March 2024	DNC	—N/a	
RLY	The Band	Winner	"Restroom Booth Confessions"	31 May 2024	DNC	—N/a	

== Albums ==
Artist	Series	Position in show	Album title	UK release date	UK peak chart position	UK certification	Ref(s)
Steve Brookstein	1	Winner	Heart and Soul	9 May 2005	1	Gold	
G4	1	Runners-up	G4	28 February 2005	1	2xPlatinum	
G4	1	Runners-up	G4 & Friends	28 November 2005	6	Platinum	
G4	1	Runners-up	Act Three	27 November 2006	21	Gold	
G4	1	Runners-up	G4 Love Songs	3 February 2017	56	—N/a	
Rowetta	1	4th	Rowetta	3 October 2005	89	—N/a	
Voices with Soul	1	6th	Celebration	16 December 2005	87	—N/a	
Shayne Ward	2	Winner	Shayne Ward	17 April 2006	1	Platinum	
Shayne Ward	2	Winner	Breathless	26 November 2007	2	Platinum	
Shayne Ward	2	Winner	Obsession	15 November 2010	15	Silver	
Shayne Ward	2	Winner	Closer	12 April 2015	17	—N/a	
Andy Abraham	2	Runner-up	The Impossible Dream	20 March 2006	2	Platinum	
Andy Abraham	2	Runner-up	Soul Man	13 November 2006	19	Gold	
Journey South	2	3rd	Journey South	20 March 2006	1	Platinum	
Journey South	2	3rd	Home	22 October 2007	43	—N/a	
Maria Lawson	2	8th	Maria Lawson	28 August 2006	41	—N/a	
Leona Lewis	3	Winner	Spirit	9 November 2007	1	10xPlatinum	
Leona Lewis	3	Winner	Echo	16 November 2009	1	2xPlatinum	
Leona Lewis	3	Winner	Glassheart	15 October 2012	3	Silver	
Leona Lewis	3	Winner	Christmas, with Love	29 November 2013	13	Gold	
Leona Lewis	3	Winner	I Am	11 September 2015	12	—N/a	
Ray Quinn	3	Runner-up	Doing It My Way	12 March 2007	1	Gold	
Ben Mills	3	3rd	Picture of You	12 March 2007	3	Gold	
The MacDonald Brothers	3	4th	The MacDonald Brothers	2 April 2007	18	—N/a	
The MacDonald Brothers	3	4th	The World Outside	15 October 2007	41	—N/a	
Leon Jackson	4	Winner	Right Now	20 October 2008	4	Gold	
Rhydian Roberts	4	Runner-up	Rhydian	24 November 2008	3	Platinum	
Rhydian Roberts	4	Runner-up	O Fortuna	30 November 2009	25	Gold	
Rhydian Roberts	4	Runner-up	Waves	13 August 2011	39	—N/a	
Rhydian Roberts	4	Runner-up	One Day Like This	7 April 2014	19	—N/a	
Same Difference	4	3rd	Pop	1 December 2008	22	Gold	
Alexandra Burke	5	Winner	Overcome	19 October 2009	1	2xPlatinum	
Alexandra Burke	5	Winner	Heartbreak on Hold	4 June 2012	18	—N/a	
Alexandra Burke	5	Winner	The Truth Is	16 March 2018	16	—N/a	
JLS	5	Runners-up	JLS	9 November 2009	1	5xPlatinum	
JLS	5	Runners-up	Outta This World	22 November 2010	2	2xPlatinum	
JLS	5	Runners-up	Jukebox	14 November 2011	2	Platinum	
JLS	5	Runners-up	Evolution	5 November 2012	3	Gold	
JLS	5	Runners-up	Goodbye – The Greatest Hits	18 November 2013	6	Gold	
JLS	5	Runners-up	2.0	3 December 2021	4	—N/a	
Eoghan Quigg	5	3rd	Eoghan Quigg	6 April 2009	14	—N/a	
Diana Vickers	5	4th	Songs from the Tainted Cherry Tree	3 May 2010	1	Gold	
Diana Vickers	5	4th	Music to Make Boys Cry	15 September 2013	37	—N/a	
Ruth Lorenzo	5	5th	Planeta Azul	27 October 2014	DNC	N/A	
Ruth Lorenzo	5	5th	Loveaholic	9 March 2018	DNC	N/A	
Joe McElderry	6	Winner	Wide Awake	25 October 2010	3	Gold	
Joe McElderry	6	Winner	Classic	22 August 2011	2	Gold	
Joe McElderry	6	Winner	Classic Christmas	25 November 2011	15	Gold	
Joe McElderry	6	Winner	Here's What I Believe	10 September 2012	8	Silver	
Joe McElderry	6	Winner	Saturday Night at the Movies	14 July 2017	10	—N/a	
Olly Murs	6	Runner-up	Olly Murs	28 November 2010	2	2xPlatinum	
Olly Murs	6	Runner-up	In Case You Didn't Know	25 November 2011	1	3xPlatinum	
Olly Murs	6	Runner-up	Right Place Right Time	26 November 2012	1	4xPlatinum	
Olly Murs	6	Runner-up	Never Been Better	24 November 2014	1	3xPlatinum	
Olly Murs	6	Runner-up	24 Hrs	11 November 2016	1	Platinum	
Olly Murs	6	Runner-up	You Know I Know	9 November 2018	2	Platinum	
Olly Murs	6	Runner-up	Marry Me	2 December 2022	1	—N/a	
Olly Murs	6	Runner-up	Knees Up	21 November 2025	5	—N/a	
Stacey Solomon	6	3rd	Shy	18 April 2015	45	—N/a	
Jedward	6	6th	Planet Jedward	16 July 2010	17	—N/a	
Jedward	6	6th	Victory	15 August 2011	34	—N/a	
Jedward	6	6th	Young Love	22 June 2012	63	—N/a	
Matt Cardle	7	Winner	Letters	17 October 2011	2	Gold	
Matt Cardle	7	Winner	The Fire	29 October 2012	8	Silver	
Matt Cardle	7	Winner	Porcelain	28 October 2013	11	—N/a	
Matt Cardle	7	Winner	Time to Be Alive	27 April 2018	28	—N/a	
Rebecca Ferguson	7	Runner-up	Heaven	5 December 2011	3	2xPlatinum	
Rebecca Ferguson	7	Runner-up	Freedom	29 November 2013	6	Gold	
Rebecca Ferguson	7	Runner-up	Lady Sings the Blues	6 March 2015	7	—N/a	
Rebecca Ferguson	7	Runner-up	Superwoman	14 October 2016	7	—N/a	
One Direction	7	3rd	Up All Night	18 November 2011	2	4xPlatinum	
One Direction	7	3rd	Take Me Home	12 November 2012	1	4xPlatinum	
One Direction	7	3rd	Midnight Memories	25 November 2013	1	3xPlatinum	
One Direction	7	3rd	Four	17 November 2014	1	3xPlatinum	
One Direction	7	3rd	Made in the A.M.	13 November 2015	1	2xPlatinum	
Zayn Malik	7	3rd (as part of One Direction)	Mind of Mine	25 March 2016	1	Gold	
Zayn Malik	7	3rd (as part of One Direction)	Icarus Falls	14 December 2018	77	Silver	
Zayn Malik	7	3rd (as part of One Direction)	Nobody Is Listening	15 January 2021	17	—N/a	
Zayn Malik	7	3rd (as part of One Direction)	Room Under the Stairs	17 May 2024	3	—N/a	
Harry Styles	7	3rd (as part of One Direction)	Harry Styles	12 May 2017	1	2xPlatinum	
Harry Styles	7	3rd (as part of One Direction)	Fine Line	13 December 2019	2	2xPlatinum	
Harry Styles	7	3rd (as part of One Direction)	Harry's House	20 May 2022	1	3xPlatinum	
Niall Horan	7	3rd (as part of One Direction)	Flicker	20 October 2017	3	Gold	
Niall Horan	7	3rd (as part of One Direction)	Heartbreak Weather	13 March 2020	1	Gold	
Niall Horan	7	3rd (as part of One Direction)	The Show	9 June 2023	1	Silver	
Liam Payne	7	3rd (as part of One Direction)	LP1	6 December 2019	17	Silver	
Louis Tomlinson	7	3rd (as part of One Direction)	Walls	31 January 2020	4	Gold	
Louis Tomlinson	7	3rd (as part of One Direction)	Faith in the Future	11 November 2022	1	Silver	
Louis Tomlinson	7	3rd (as part of One Direction)	How Did I Get Here?	23 January 2026	1	—N/a	
Cher Lloyd	7	4th	Sticks and Stones	7 November 2011	4	Gold	
Cher Lloyd	7	4th	Sorry I'm Late	28 July 2014	21	—N/a	
Mary Byrne	7	5th	Mine & Yours	28 March 2011	6	Silver	
Mary Byrne	7	5th	…with Love	5 March 2012	28	—N/a	
Aiden Grimshaw	7	9th	Misty Eye	20 August 2012	19	—N/a	
Little Mix	8	Winner	DNA	19 November 2012	3	Platinum	
Little Mix	8	Winner	Salute	8 November 2013	4	Platinum	
Little Mix	8	Winner	Get Weird	6 November 2015	2	3xPlatinum	
Little Mix	8	Winner	Glory Days	18 November 2016	1	4xPlatinum	
Little Mix	8	Winner	LM5	16 November 2018	3	Platinum	
Little Mix	8	Winner	Confetti	6 November 2020	2	Platinum	
Little Mix	8	Winner	Between Us	12 November 2021	3	2xPlatinum	
JADE	8	1st (as part of Little Mix)	That's Showbiz Baby	12 September 2025	3	Sliver	
Perrie	8	1st (as part of Little Mix)	Perrie	26 September 2025	3	—N/a	
Leigh-Anne	8	1st (as part of Little Mix)	My Ego Told Me To	20 February 2026	3	—N/a	
Marcus Collins	8	Runner-up	Marcus Collins	12 March 2012	7	—N/a	
Janet Devlin	8	5th	Running with Scissors	9 June 2014	43	—N/a	
Janet Devlin	8	5th	Confessional	5 June 2020	DNC	—N/a	
James Arthur	9	Winner	James Arthur	4 November 2013	2	Platinum	
James Arthur	9	Winner	Back from the Edge	4 November 2016	1	Platinum	
James Arthur	9	Winner	You	18 October 2019	2	Gold	
James Arthur	9	Winner	It'll All Make Sense in the End	5 November 2021	3	Silver	
James Arthur	9	Winner	Bitter Sweet Love	26 January 2024	1	Sliver	
James Arthur	9	Winner	Pisces	25 April 2025	3	—N/a	
Jahméne Douglas	9	Runner-up	Love Never Fails	22 July 2013	1	Silver	
Jahméne Douglas	9	Runner-up	Unfathomable Phantasmagoria	23 September 2016	DNC	—N/a	
Union J	9	4th	Union J	28 October 2013	6	Silver	
Union J	9	4th	You Got It All – The Album	8 December 2014	28	—N/a	
Ella Henderson	9	6th	Chapter One	13 October 2014	1	Platinum	
Ella Henderson	9	6th	Everything I Didn't Say	11 March 2022	8	Gold	
Lucy Spraggan	9	9th	Top Room at the Zoo	8 September 2012	22	—N/a	
Lucy Spraggan	9	9th	Join the Club	19 October 2013	7	Silver	
Lucy Spraggan	9	9th	We Are	4 May 2015	22	—N/a	
Lucy Spraggan	9	9th	I Hope You Don't Mind Me Writing	27 January 2017	12	—N/a	
Lucy Spraggan	9	9th	Today Was a Good Day	3 May 2019	12	—N/a	
Lucy Spraggan	9	9th	Choices	26 February 2021	5	—N/a	
Sam Bailey	10	Winner	The Power of Love	24 March 2014	1	Gold	
Sam Bailey	10	Winner	Sing My Heart Out	16 September 2016	33	—N/a	
Nicholas McDonald	10	Runner-up	In the Arms of an Angel	1 March 2014	6	—N/a	
Ben Haenow	11	Winner	Ben Haenow	13 November 2015	10	Silver	
Fleur East	11	Runner-up	Love, Sax and Flashbacks	4 December 2015	14	Silver	
Fleur East	11	Runner-up	Fearless	20 March 2020	DNC	—N/a	
Andrea Faustini	11	3rd	Kelly	15 July 2015	14	—N/a	
Matt Terry	13	Winner	Trouble	24 November 2017	29	—N/a	
Saara Aalto	13	Runner-up	Wild Wild Wonderland	27 April 2018	DNC	—N/a	
Grace Davies	14	Runner-up	The Wrong Side of 25	11 July 2025	DNC	—N/a	

== See also ==
- Popstars (UK) discography
- Fame Academy discography
- Pop Idol discography
- The Voice UK discography
