= List of number-one songs of 2018 (Lebanon) =

This is a list of the Official Lebanese Top 20 number-one songs of 2018. The songs' popularity is determined by radio airplay frequency throughout a given week, audited and compiled by Ipsos SA. The Official Lebanese Top 20 provides two charts: Combined and English (which actually includes all "Western" songs, regardless of their language).

== Chart history ==
Issue Date	English		Ref.
Issue Date	Song	Artist(s)	Ref.
January 7	"Échame la Culpa"	Luis Fonsi ft. Demi Lovato	
January 28	"Naked"	James Arthur	
February 4	"Roll With It"	Massari ft. Mohammed Assaf	
February 18	"One Night"	Rodge ft. Meerah	
March 4	"River"	Eminem ft. Ed Sheeran	
March 18	"Pray for Me"	The Weeknd & Kendrick Lamar	
April 1	"For You"	Liam Payne ft. Rita Ora	
April 8	"Pray for Me"	The Weeknd & Kendrick Lamar	
April 22	"For You"	Liam Payne ft. Rita Ora	
April 29	"Friends"	Marshmello & Anne-Marie	
May 27	"One Kiss"	Calvin Harris ft. Dua Lipa	
July 1	"Girls Like You"	Maroon 5 ft. Cardi B	
July 22	"Bella ciao"	Rodge ft. Tre Tenori	
August 5	"In My Feelings"	Drake	
September 16	"It Starts with Love"	Rodge ft. Gary Pine	
