= Finally Feel Good =

Single by James Arthur

from the album You
- Released: 27 September 2019
- Recorded: 2018
- Length: 3:26
- Label: Columbia
- Songwriters: Eric Frederic; James Arthur; Justin Tranter; Scott Harper
- Producer: Ricky Reed

James Arthur singles chronology
"Treehouse" (2019)	"Finally Feel Good" (2019)	"You" (2019)

"Finally Feel Good" is a song by British singer-songwriter James Arthur. It was released as a digital download and for streaming on 27 September 2019, as the fifth single from Arthur's studio third album, You. The song was written by Eric Frederic, James Arthur, Justin Tranter, Scott Harper and produced by Ricky Reed.

== Critical reception ==
Mike Wass of Idolator stated that the song is a "cathartic ode about making peace with yourself".

== Track listing ==
Digital download
No.	Title	Length
1.	"Finally Feel Good"	3:26

== Charts ==
Chart (2019)	Peak position
New Zealand Hot Singles (RMNZ)	21

== Release history ==
Region	Date	Format	Label
United Kingdom	27 September 2019	Digital download; streaming	Columbia
