= Empty Space (song) =

Single by James Arthur

from the album You
- Released: 19 October 2018
- Length: 3:33
- Label: Columbia
- Songwriter(s): Richard Boardman; James Arthur; Pablo Bowman; Nick Gate
- Producer(s): Dan Priddy; Mark Crew; Digital Farm Animals

James Arthur singles chronology
"You Deserve Better / At My Weakest" (2018)	"Empty Space" (2018)	"Rewrite the Stars" (2018)

Music video
- "Empty Space" on YouTube

"Empty Space" is a song by British singer James Arthur. The song was released as a digital download and for streaming on 19 October 2018 by Columbia Records as the second single from Arthur's third studio album, You. The song was written by Arthur along with Richard Boardman, Pablo Bowman, Nick Gate and produced by Dan Priddy, Mark Crew and Digital Farm Animals. As of 2021, it has sold 534,441 copies in the UK.

== Background ==
Talking about the song, Arthur said, "This song is for anyone who has ever deeply loved and lost someone dear to them, and is then faced with the struggle of trying to fill that void. It is about coming to terms with the fact that only that special person can truly fill the empty space."

== Music video ==
A music video to accompany the release of "Empty Space" was first released onto YouTube on 1 November 2018. The video features actor Tom Felton.

== Live performances ==
- The X Factor (4 November 2018)

== Track listings ==
Digital download
No.	Title	Length
1.	"Empty Space"	3:33

Digital download – Digital Farm Animals and Franklin remix
No.	Title	Length
1.	"Empty Space" (Digital Farm Animals and Franklin remix)	3:29

Digital download – Luca Schreiner remix
No.	Title	Length
1.	"Empty Space" (Luca Schreiner remix)	3:22

Digital download – Vevo live acoustic
No.	Title	Length
1.	"Empty Space"	4:33
2.	"Silent Night"	3:52

== Charts ==
Chart (2018–2019)	Peak position
Austria (Ö3 Austria Top 40)	63
Ireland (IRMA)	28
Germany (GfK)	99
Malaysia (RIM)	6
Scotland (OCC)	6
Singapore (RIAS)	10
Sweden (Sverigetopplistan)	93
Switzerland (Schweizer Hitparade)	40
UK Singles (OCC)	22

== Certifications ==
Region	Certification	Certified units/sales
Brazil (Pro-Música Brasil)	Platinum	40,000^{‡}
Canada (Music Canada)	Platinum	80,000^{‡}
Denmark (IFPI Danmark)	Gold	45,000^{‡}
New Zealand (RMNZ)	Gold	15,000^{‡}
United Kingdom (BPI)	Platinum	600,000^{‡}
^{‡} Sales+streaming figures based on certification alone.

== Release history ==
Region	Date	Format	Label
United Kingdom	19 October 2018	Digital download	Sony Music
United Kingdom	26 October 2018	Digital download – Digital Farm Animals and Franklin remix	Sony Music
United Kingdom	9 November 2018	Digital download – Luca Schreiner remix	Sony Music
United Kingdom	7 December 2018	Digital download – Vevo live acoustic single	Sony Music
