= You Deserve Better =

Single by James Arthur
- A-side: "At My Weakest"
- Released: 1 June 2018
- Length: 3:27
- Label: Columbia
- Songwriter(s): James Arthur; TMS; Camille Purcell
- Producer(s): TMS

James Arthur singles chronology
"You Can Cry" (2018)	"You Deserve Better" / "At My Weakest" (2018)	"Empty Space" (2018)

"You Deserve Better" is a song by British singer James Arthur, released as a double A-side single with "At My Weakest" on 1 June 2018 through Columbia Records. The song was written by Arthur, TMS and Camille Purcell, and produced by TMS.

== Background and composition ==
"You Deserve Better" was recorded by James Arthur for his third studio album, now titled You, but never made the official track listing. Arthur wrote the track along with TMS and Camille Purcell. It was released as part of a promotional double A-side titled "You Deserve Better"/"At My Weakest" on 1 June 2018. The lyrics of the song tell of a man who believes that his lover would be better off without him.

== Live performances ==
In June 2018, Arthur performed "You Deserve Better" live on The Voice Australia and at the Summertime Ball.

== Chart performance ==
After being released, "You Deserve Better" entered at number 53 on the UK Singles Chart.

== Charts ==
Chart performance for "You Deserve Better"
Chart (2018)	Peak position
Australia (ARIA)	68
Belgium (Ultratop 50 Wallonia)	45
Czech Republic (Rádio – Top 100)	60
Ireland (IRMA)	48
New Zealand Heatseekers (RMNZ)	5
Scotland (OCC)	27
Switzerland (Schweizer Hitparade)	72
UK Singles (OCC)	53

== Certifications ==
Certifications for "You Deserve Better"
Region	Certification	Certified units/sales
United Kingdom (BPI)	Silver	200,000^{‡}
^{‡} Sales+streaming figures based on certification alone.
