= You (James Arthur album) =

Studio album by James Arthur
- Released: 18 October 2019
- Studio: Conway (Los Angeles); The Cutting Room (New York City); Dean Street (London); Eg's (London); The Music Shed (Manchester); MXM (Los Angeles); One Eyed Jack's (London); RAK (London); Snap! (London); Village Recorder (Los Angeles); Westlake Recording (Los Angeles)
- Length: 62:33
- Label: Columbia
- Producer: Alexander Beitzke; busbee; Johan Carlsson; Mark Crew; Ryan Daly; DaviDior; Digital Farm Animals; Jamie Hartman; King Henry; Nic Nac; Dan Priddy; Jonathan Quarmby; Red Triangle; Ricky Reed; Bradley Spence; TMS; Eg White

James Arthur chronology
Back from the Edge (2016)	You (2019)	It'll All Make Sense in the End (2021)

Singles from You
- 1. "Naked" Released: 24 November 2017; 2. "Empty Space" Released: 19 October 2018; 3. "Falling Like the Stars" Released: 10 May 2019; 4. "Treehouse" Released: 6 September 2019; 5. "Finally Feel Good" Released: 27 September 2019; 6. "You" Released: 11 October 2019; 7. "Quite Miss Home" Released: 18 October 2019

You is the third studio album by British singer-songwriter James Arthur. Released on 18 October 2019, it spawned the singles "Naked", "Empty Space", "Falling Like the Stars", "Treehouse", "Finally Feel Good", "You", and "Quite Miss Home". Arthur embarked on the You – Up Close and Personal tour in North America from 13 September 2019 to 23 September 2019 and was on the UK You – Up Close and Personal tour until 29 October 2019. The album debuted at number two on the UK Albums Chart.

== Background ==
Arthur told 1883 Magazine in June 2019 that the album was "pretty much finished" and that it was undergoing mixing and mastering. He described it as "diverse, conceptual, [and] soulful" as well as "inspired by the stories of others" and "definitely not introspective" as compared to his previous album, 2016's Back from the Edge.

== Critical reception ==
Writing for the Star Tribune, Mark Kennedy gave an overall negative review, calling Arthur "buried in sadness [on You]", adding "[t]o borrow a song title from him, if you can get through this album, you can get through anything". Lisa-Marie Ferla of The Arts Desk gave it a mixed review: she awarded it 3 out of 5 stars but said "[p]rune away at least four soporific ballads, though, and you'll find a decent pop-soul album". Phoebe Luckhurst from The Evening Standard gave a positive review, stating "He demonstrates his range on soulful 'Marine Parade', and the R'n'B-inflected 'If We Can Get Through This We Can Get Through Anything'. He's in intelligent power-ballad form in 'Car's Outside' and 'Quite Miss Home'".

== Track listing ==
You track listing
No.	Title	Writer(s)	Producer(s)	Length
1.	"You" (featuring Travis Barker)	James Arthur; George Tizzard; Richard Parkhouse; Travis Barker	Red Triangle	3:52
2.	"Finally Feel Good"	Arthur; Justin Tranter; Eric Frederic; Scott Harper	Ricky Reed; Nate Mercereau^{[c]}; Harper^{[c]}	3:36
3.	"Marine Parade (2013)"	Arthur; Thomas Barnes; Peter Kelleher; Benjamin Kohn; Bob Montgomery	TMS	3:12
4.	"If We Can Get Through This We Can Get Through Anything"	Arthur; James Newman; Francis White; Kyle Burns	Eg White	3:35
5.	"Car's Outside"	Arthur; David Gibson; Bradley Spence; Alexander Beitzke	Spence; Beitzke; Mark Crew^{[v]}; Dan Priddy^{[v]}	4:09
6.	"Quite Miss Home"	Arthur; Michael Pollack; Brett McLaughlin; Michael Busbee; Ryan Daly	busbee; Daly	4:03
7.	"Treehouse" (with Ty Dolla Sign featuring Shotty Horroh)	Arthur; Andrew Jackson; Nicholas Balding; Chaz William Mishan; David "DaviDior" Park; Tyrone Griffin Jr.; Adam Rooney	Nic Nac; DaviDior	3:40
8.	"Sad Eyes"	Arthur; Ilsey Juber; Daniel Parker; Henry Agincourt Allen	King Henry	4:10
9.	"Unconditionally" (featuring Adam Lazzara)	Arthur; Adam Lazzara; John Nolan; Mark O'Connell; Shaun Cooper	Crew; Priddy	3:02
10.	"Homicide Love"	Arthur; Lazzara; Nolan; O'Connell; Cooper; Edward Reyes	Jonathan Quarmby	3:57
11.	"Breathe"	Arthur	Quarmby	3:20
12.	"Maybe"	Arthur; Jamie Graham	Spence; Beitzke	3:40
13.	"Fall"	Arthur	Crew; Priddy	3:43
14.	"Falling Like the Stars"	Arthur; Jamie Grey; Anders Albin Höjer	Spence; Beitzke	3:32
15.	"Empty Space"	Arthur; Richard Boardman; Pablo Bowman; Nicholas Gale	Crew; Priddy; Digital Farm Animals	3:33
16.	"Naked"	Arthur; Savan Kotecha; Karl Sandberg; Johan Carlsson	Carlsson	3:53
17.	"From Me to You I Hate Everybody"	Arthur; Samuel Romans; Jamie Hartman	Hartman	3:36
Total length:				62:33

=== Notes ===
- ^{^[c]}signifies a co-producer
- ^{^[v]}signifies a vocal producer

== Credits and personnel ==
Credits adapted from the album's liner notes.

=== Vocals ===
- James Arthur – vocals, songwriting (all tracks)
- Johan Carlsson – backing vocals (16)
- Johanna Strömblad Jonasson – backing vocals (16)
- Max Martin – backing vocals (16)
- Charlie Puth – beatbox (16)
- Eg White – backing vocals (4)

=== Instrumentation ===
- James Arthur – guitar (4, 9, 13, 15)
- Tom Barnes – drums (3)
- Alexander Beitzke – bass, guitar (5), keyboards (5, 12)
- Dan Bingham – bass (15), drums, piano (5, 12)
- David Bukovinszky – cello (16)
- Mattias Bylund – strings (16)
- Johan Carlsson – guitar, electric guitar, piano, synths, tambourine, B3 organ (16)
- Jack Duxbury – electric guitar (4, 13)
- Verity Evanson – cello (13)
- Rob Harris – guitar (5, 12)
- Mattias Johansson – violin (16)
- Pete Kelleher – bass, guitar (3)
- Ben Kohn – keyboards (3)
- Jeremy Lertola – guitar (16)
- Nate Mercereau – bass, guitar, piano (2)
- Gemma Sharples – violin (13)
- Paul Turner – bass (12)
- Eg White – Rhodes piano, synth (4)

=== Production ===
- Alexander Beitzke – production (5, 12, 14), vocal production (5)
- busbee – production (6)
- Johan Carlsson – production, vocal production (16)
- Mark Crew – production (5, 9, 13, 15), vocal production (5)
- Ryan Daly – production (6)
- DaviDior – production (7)
- Digital Farm Animals – production (15)
- Carlos de la Garza – additional vocal recording (6)
- Jamie Hartman – production (17)
- King Henry – production (8)
- Nic Nac – production (7)
- Dan Priddy – production (5, 9, 13, 15), vocal production (5)
- Jonathan Quarmby – production (10, 11)
- Red Triangle – production (1)
- Ricky Reed – production (2)
- Bradley Spence – production (5, 12, 14), vocal production (5)
- TMS – production (3)
- Eg White – production (4)

=== Technical ===
- busbee – engineering (6)
- Greg Eliason – engineering, recording (8)
- Jamie Hartman – engineering, recording (17)
- Wes Maebe – engineering (10)
- Nate Mercereau – engineering (2)
- Red Triangle – engineering, recording (1)
- Ricky Reed – engineering, programming (2)
- Alexander Beitzke – engineering, mixing, recording (5, 12, 14)
- Billy Foster – assistant recording engineering (12)
- Jeremy Nichols – assistant recording engineering (8)
- Max Anstruther – assistant engineering (10)
- Marek Deml – assistant engineering (10), additional programming (11)
- Scott Desmarais – assistant engineering (15)
- Robin Florent – assistant engineering (15)
- Fabio Senna – assistant engineering (12)
- Jesse Brock – assistant mix engineer (2, 7, 8)
- Miles Comaskey – assistant mix engineer (6)
- Joel Davies – assistant mix engineer (1, 3)
- Charles Haydon Hicks – assistant mix engineer (1, 3)
- Tom Barnes – programming (3)
- Dan Priddy – programming (4, 9, 13)
- Ricky Reed – programming (2)
- Steve Fitzmaurice – additional programming (11), mixing (10, 11)
- Serge Courtois – mixing (17)
- Mark Crew – mixing, programming (4, 9, 13)
- Serban Ghenea – mixing (16)
- Dan Grech-Marguerat – mixing (1, 3)
- Manny Marroquin – mixing (15)
- Tony Maserati – mixing (6)
- Sean Moffitt – mixing (2, 7, 8)
- Emerson Mancini – mastering (15)
- Randy Merrill – mastering (1–14, 16, 17)

=== Design ===
- Adult Art Club – design
- Louis Browne – photography

== Charts ==
Chart (2019)	Peak position
Australian Albums (ARIA)	23
Austrian Albums (Ö3 Austria)	31
Belgian Albums (Ultratop Flanders)	87
Canadian Albums (Billboard)	57
Dutch Albums (Album Top 100)	60
French Albums (SNEP)	130
German Albums (Offizielle Top 100)	35
Irish Albums (IRMA)	7
Lithuanian Albums (AGATA)	39
New Zealand Albums (RMNZ)	33
Polish Albums (ZPAV)	40
Portuguese Albums (AFP)	12
Scottish Albums (OCC)	4
South Korean Albums (Gaon)	96
Spanish Albums (Promusicae)	65
Swiss Albums (Schweizer Hitparade)	5
UK Albums (OCC)	2
US Billboard 200	186

== Certifications ==
Certifications for You
Region	Certification	Certified units/sales
Brazil (Pro-Música Brasil)	3× Platinum	120,000^{‡}
Canada (Music Canada)	Gold	40,000^{‡}
Denmark (IFPI Danmark)	Gold	10,000^{‡}
New Zealand (RMNZ)	Platinum	15,000^{‡}
Norway (IFPI Norway)	Platinum	20,000^{‡}
Poland (ZPAV)	Gold	10,000^{‡}
Singapore (RIAS)	Platinum	10,000^{*}
Switzerland (IFPI Switzerland)	Gold	10,000^{‡}
United Kingdom (BPI)	Gold	100,000^{‡}
^{*} Sales figures based on certification alone.^{‡} Sales+streaming figures based on certification alone.
