= Falling Like the Stars =

Single by James Arthur

from the album You
- Released: 10 May 2019
- Recorded: 2018
- Length: 3:32
- Label: Columbia
- Songwriters: James Arthur; Anders Albin Höjer; Jamie Grey
- Producers: Bradley Spence; Alex Beitzke

James Arthur singles chronology
"Nobody" (2019)	"Falling Like the Stars" (2019)	"Treehouse" (2019)

"Falling Like the Stars" is a song by British singer-songwriter James Arthur. It was released as a digital download and for streaming on 10 May 2019, as the third single from Arthur's third album You. The song peaked at number 25 on the UK Singles Chart and was written by James Arthur, Anders Albin Höjer, Jamie Grey and produced by Bradley Spence and Alex Beitzke.

== Background ==
In an interview with iHeartRadio, Arthur said: "This song perfectly represents what I do best, I think," Arthur told iHeartRadio of the tune. "I think that's the why it became the front runner to be the next single of this particular album. The core of the album has got that classic James Arthur acoustic, honest thing going on."

== Music video ==
A music video to accompany the release of "Falling Like the Stars" was first released onto YouTube on 24 May 2019 at a total length of four minutes and fifteen seconds. The video has 25 million views as of December 2019.

== Track listing ==
Digital download
No.	Title	Length
1.	"Falling Like the Stars"	3:32

== Charts ==
Chart (2019–2020)	Peak position
Australia (ARIA)	51
Ireland (IRMA)	28
New Zealand Heatseekers (RMNZ)	7
Portugal (AFP)	120
Scotland Singles (OCC)	7
Singapore (RIAS)	26
Sweden (Sverigetopplistan)	49
Switzerland (Schweizer Hitparade)	28
UK Singles (OCC)	25
US Adult Pop Airplay (Billboard)	31

== Certifications ==
Region	Certification	Certified units/sales
Brazil (Pro-Música Brasil)	Diamond	160,000^{‡}
Canada (Music Canada)	2× Platinum	160,000^{‡}
Denmark (IFPI Danmark)	Platinum	90,000^{‡}
Mexico (AMPROFON)	Gold	30,000^{‡}
New Zealand (RMNZ)	Platinum	30,000^{‡}
Poland (ZPAV)	Gold	10,000^{‡}
Portugal (AFP)	Platinum	10,000^{‡}
Spain (PROMUSICAE)	Gold	30,000^{‡}
Switzerland (IFPI Switzerland)	Gold	10,000^{‡}
United Kingdom (BPI)	Platinum	600,000^{‡}
^{‡} Sales+streaming figures based on certification alone.

== Release history ==
Region	Date	Format	Label
United Kingdom	10 May 2019	Digital download; streaming	Columbia
