= You Can Cry =

Single by Marshmello and Juicy J featuring James Arthur
- Released: May 4, 2018
- Length: 3:14
- Label: Joytime Collective; Columbia
- Songwriters: Christopher Comstock; Jordan Houston; Charlie Puth; Taiwo Hassan; Kehinde Hassan
- Producers: Marshmello; Christian Rich (co.)

Marshmello singles chronology
"Fly" (2018)	"You Can Cry" (2018)	"Tell Me" (2018)

Juicy J singles chronology
"Powerglide" (2018)	"You Can Cry" (2018)	"Neighbor" (2018)

James Arthur singles chronology
"Naked" (2017)	"You Can Cry" (2018)	"You Deserve Better / At My Weakest" (2018)

Remixes

Music video
- "You Can Cry" on YouTube

"You Can Cry" is a song by American DJ Marshmello and American rapper Juicy J featuring English singer-songwriter James Arthur. Written by the lead artists alongside Charlie Puth and Christian Rich, the latter co-producing, it was released by Joytime Collective and Columbia Records on May 4, 2018.

== Release and composition ==
On April 29, 2018, Marshmello announced the song on social media with a short snippet. Arthur previously wrote in a tweet about how excited he was to be recording vocals for the track. "You Can Cry" is a hip hop ballad that features "a slow, sentimental beat" and a falsetto chorus performed by Arthur. Lyrically, the song is about having a partner who shows love and care. Juicy J also interpolates "Big Fish" by Vince Staples in the song.

== Critical reception ==
Peter A. Berry of XXL wrote of the song: "With this eclectic blend of artists comes a unique sound, and we mean that in the best way imaginable." He opined that "Juicy's flow rings through loud and clear, even as Arthur's smooth vocals melt into the energetic instrumental", capturing both of the artists' dynamic talents. Your EDM's Matthew Meadow noted the song's lack of a drop and "the Marshmello sound", whilst praising Arthur's falsetto chorus and Juicy J's smooth and reserved style.

== Track listing ==
Digital download
No.	Title	Length
1.	"You Can Cry"	3:14

Digital download – remixes
No.	Title	Length
1.	"You Can Cry" (THRDL!FE remix)	3:41
2.	"You Can Cry" (Sumr Camp remix)	2:54

== Personnel ==
Credits adapted from Tidal.

- Marshmello – production, mix engineering, master engineering
- Juicy J – vocals
- James Arthur – vocals
- Michael "Crazy Mike" Foster – record engineering

== Charts ==
Chart (2018)	Peak position
New Zealand Heatseekers (RMNZ)	9
Sweden Heatseeker (Sverigetopplistan)	12
UK Singles (OCC)	91

== Certifications ==
Region	Certification	Certified units/sales
Brazil (Pro-Música Brasil)	Gold	20,000^{‡}
^{‡} Sales+streaming figures based on certification alone.

== Release history ==
Region	Date	Format	Label	Ref.
Various	May 4, 2018	Digital download; streaming	Joytime Collective	
United States	May 15, 2018	Contemporary hit radio	Columbia	
United States	May 15, 2018	Rhythmic contemporary radio	Columbia	
Italy	May 18, 2018	Contemporary hit radio	Sony	
Various	June 15, 2018	Digital download; streaming	Joytime Collective	
