= Quite Miss Home =

Single by James Arthur

from the album You
- Released: 18 October 2019
- Recorded: 2019
- Length: 4:03
- Label: Columbia
- Songwriters: Leland; Michael Pollack; Ryan Daly; Busbee; James Arthur
- Producers: Ryan Daly; Busbee

James Arthur singles chronology
"You" (2019)	"Quite Miss Home" (2019)	"Lasting Lover" (2020)

"Quite Miss Home" is a song by British singer-songwriter James Arthur. It was released as a digital download and for streaming on 18 October 2019, as the seventh and final single from Arthur's third studio album, You. The song was written by Leland, Michael Pollack, Ryan Daly, Busbee and James Arthur. The music video of this song, is dedicated to Busbee, who helped to produce and write this song.

== Live performances ==
On 2 November 2019, Arthur performed the song live during the live shows of The X Factor: Celebrity.

== Charts and certifications ==
Chart (2019)	Peak position
Ireland (IRMA)	60
New Zealand Hot Singles (RMNZ)	15
Scotland Singles (OCC)	28
Switzerland (Schweizer Hitparade)	56
UK Singles (OCC)	77

=== Certifications ===
Region	Certification	Certified units/sales
Brazil (Pro-Música Brasil)	Gold	20,000^{‡}
United Kingdom (BPI)	Silver	200,000^{‡}
^{‡} Sales+streaming figures based on certification alone.

== Release history ==
Region	Date	Format	Label
United Kingdom	18 October 2019	Digital download; streaming	Columbia
