= Scott Harper (composer) =

American composer

Scott Elder Harper
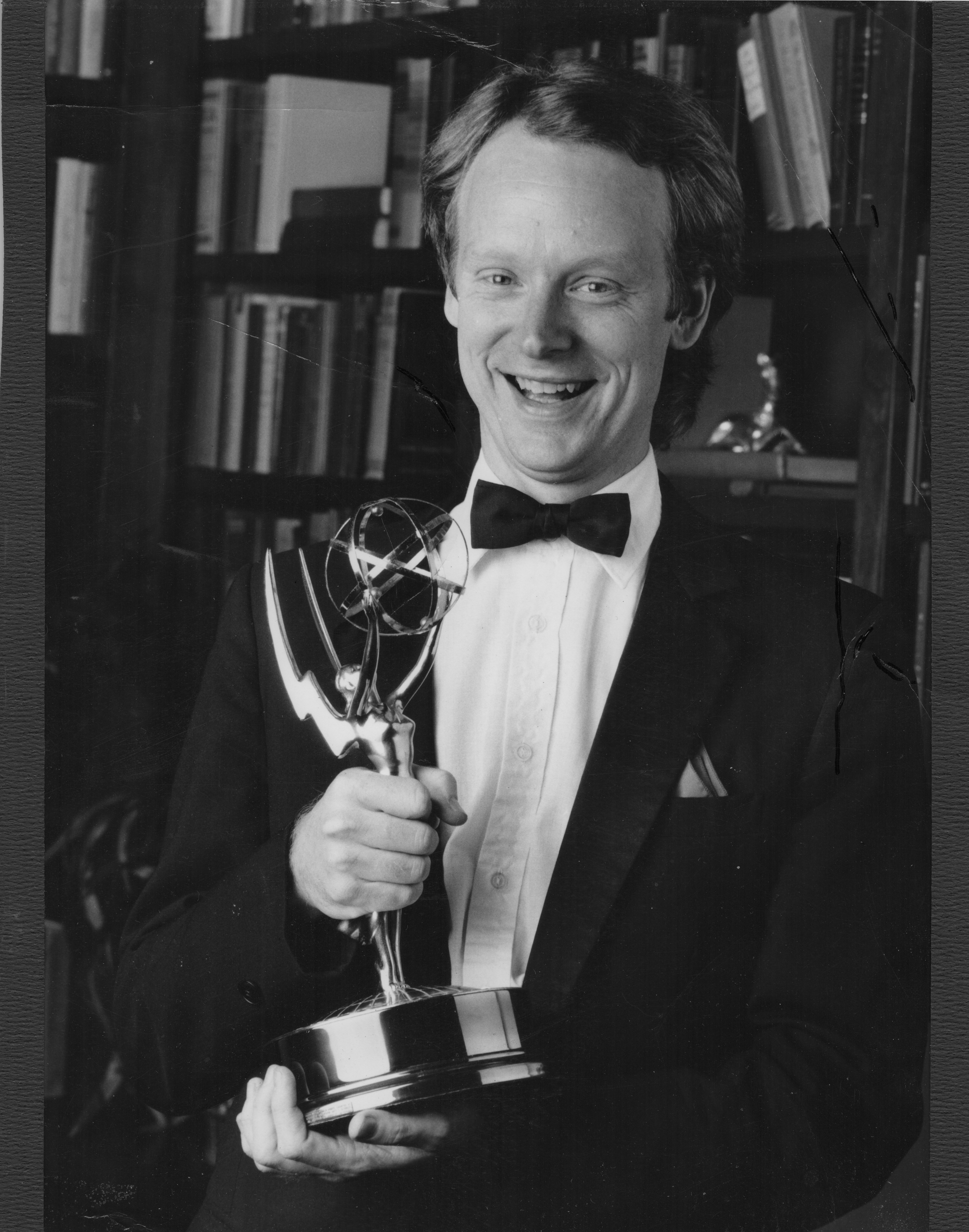
- Scott Harper receiving the first of his two Emmy Awards, 1986.

Background information
- Born: Scott Gleckler; December 22, 1952 (age 73); Pasadena, California, US
- Genres: Film score: contemporary classical music; post-romanticism; jazz; pop/rock
- Occupations: Composer, orchestrator, arranger, conductor, musician
- Instrument: Double Bass, Piano, Violin, Saxophone, Cello, Electric Bass
- Years active: 1975–present
- Website: www.fullscore.com
- Education: Royal College of Music, Double Bass, Performing, Honors Graduate, 1977
- Organization: Hollywood Studio Symphony Orchestra
- Awards: Emmy Awards for Outstanding Achievement in Music Composition (1986), Emmy Awards for Individual Achievement in Music Composition (1990)

Scott Elder Harper (born Scott Gleckler; December 22, 1952) is an American composer, arranger and musician for motion picture and television scores and orchestra.

== Biography ==
In 1986, Scott Harper and co-writer Lyn Murray were awarded an Emmy Award for Outstanding Achievement in Music Composition for the National Geographic Special: Miraculous Machines. Harper was awarded a second Emmy in the Music Categories for "Amazon, Land of The Flooded Forest", a National Geographic Special on PBS.

In 1980, he changed his name from Gleckler to Harper.

Harper married Susan Picking Harper in 1994. They have a daughter named Lauralee.

== Discography ==
=== Original motion picture soundtracks ===
Performances with the Hollywood Studio Symphony Orchestra

- 2018: Commando (Original Motion Picture Soundtrack) – bass player
- 2008: Indiana Jones: The Complete Soundtracks Collection (Original Motion Picture Soundtracks) – bass player
- 1987: Harry and the Hendersons (Original Motion Picture Soundtrack) – bass player
- 1984: Indiana Jones and the Temple of Doom (Original Motion Picture Soundtrack) – bass player
- 1983: The Right Stuff (Original Motion Picture Soundtrack) – bass player
- 1983: E.T., the Extraterrestrial (Original Motion Picture Soundtrack) – Double bass player

=== Film and TV music compositions ===
- 1999: The Free Willy Story – Keiko's Journey Home (TV movie) – composer
- 1998: To Hell With Love (feature film) – composer
- 1994: Roseanne: An Unauthorized Biography (TV movie) – composer
- 1993: Phenom (TV series) – composer, 2 episodes
  - "Crazy for You" (1993)
  - "Answered Prayers" (1993) – composer
- 1992: Hearts Are Wild (TV series) – composer
- 1991: Night Games (film) – composer
- 1991: The Point! (film) – composer
- 1990: A Woman's Heart (film short) – composer
- 1989: Serengeti Diary (TV film) – composer of "a lovely, subdued score"
- 1987: Eat & Run (feature film)

=== Documentary scores ===
- 2008: Proof of Propaganda (documentary) – composer
- 2008: Food Fight (documentary) – composer
- 1993: Wilderness: The Last Stand (documentary) – 3 episodes
- 1990–1992: World of Discovery (documentary TV series) – composer; 2 episodes:
  - "Realm of the Serpent" (1992)
  - "Inventors: Out Of Their Minds" (1990)
- 1992: Survive Siberia (documentary TV film) – composer
- 1990: The Urban Gorilla (documentary TV film) – composer
- 1990: Amazon: Land of the Flooded Forest (documentary TV film) – Emmy Award for Outstanding Achievement in Music & Composition
- 1985–1989: National Geographic Specials (documentary feature film TV series):
  - "Those Wonderful Dogs" (1989) – composer
  - "Mysteries of Mankind" (1988) – composer
  - "The Grizzlies" (1987) – composer
  - "Miraculous Machines" (1985) – composer; Emmy Award for Outstanding Achievement in Music & Composition
- 1987: The Grizzlies (documentary TV film)

=== Popular music ===
- 2008: Three Graces, Three Graces – orchestration, string arrangements
- 2005: Chronicles, Cher -album arrangements
- 2003: A Time for the Soul, Winard Harper – percussion
- 2002: Memphis Rockabillies: Hillbillies and Honky Tonkers – composer
- 2002: The Slash Recordings, The Blasters – composer
- 2002: The Colour of My Love, Celine Dion – conductor, string arrangements, string conductor
- 1999: Say Man!, Bill Stuve – composer
- 1998: Backtracking: The Duke Recordings, Vol. 2, Junior Parker – composer
- 1997: Ricky Jones, Ricky Jones – conductor, orchestral arrangements
- 1997: Ultimatum, Ultimatum – engineer
- 1996: Chapters, Steve Chapman – guitar (bass)
- 1996: Kissing Rain, Roch Voisine – conductor, string arrangements
- 1994: Federico Mompou: Music for Piano, Michel Wagemans – audio engineer
- 1993: The Colour of My Love, Celine Dion – string arrangements, string conductor
- 1992: Deeper Than A River, Back to Basics
- 1991: Love Hurts, Cher – album arrangements

=== Performances ===
- 1983: Karen Akers

== Awards ==
Year	Nominated work	Category	Result	Notes
1977	"Freer Thou"	Cobbett Prize, Royal College of Music	Won	Clarinet, violoncello, piano
1986	Miraculous Machines	20th Primetime Emmy Awards; Outstanding Achievement in Musical Composition	Won	with Lyn Murray
1990	Amazon, Land of the Flooded Forest	23rd Primetime Emmy Awards; Individual Achievement in Musical Composition	Won	
