= Treehouse (song) =

Single by James Arthur and Ty Dolla Sign featuring Shotty Horroh

from the album You
- Released: 6 September 2019
- Recorded: 2018
- Length: 3:40
- Label: Columbia
- Songwriter(s): Andrew Jackson; James Arthur; Nicholas Balding; DaviDior; Adam Rooney; Tyrone Griffin Jr.
- Producer(s): Nic Nac; DaviDior

James Arthur singles chronology
| "Falling Like the Stars" (2019) | "Treehouse" (2019) | "Finally Feel Good" (2019) |

Ty Dolla Sign singles chronology
| "Hottest in the City" (2019) | "Treehouse" (2019) | "Midnight Hour" (2019) |

Shotty Horroh singles chronology
| "Are You Not Afraid" (2019) | "Treehouse" (2019) |

"Treehouse" is a song by British singer-songwriter James Arthur and American singer-songwriter Ty Dolla $ign featuring British rapper Shotty Horroh. It was released as a digital download and for streaming on 6 September 2019, as the fourth single from the former's third album You.

== Background ==
In a statement, James Arthur said: "Treehouse is a song about surrendering – going to a safe place, a sanctuary where you can get away from your troubles. The sentiment is 'it's okay not to be okay', just take a load off and go to your happy place. The line 'I don't know why you don't ask for help' could be directed at me, but everyone feels life getting on top of them at times. That’s the message I want to share. It's an inclusive song, not a personal one". In an interview with the Official Charts Company, Arthur acknowledged that the song was a "change of pace" for him, and remarked that "My hardcore fans know I'm a huge hip-hop fan[,] and that's where my heart is. [...] I've been hard-positioned as this guy who just does ballads – that's not me at all. I enjoy taking on a lot of styles. It had to be something like this".

== Music video ==
A music video to accompany the release of "Treehouse" was first released onto YouTube on 6 September 2019.

== Track listing ==
Digital download
| No. | Title | Length |
|---|---|---|
| 1. | "Treehouse" (with Ty Dolla $ign featuring Shotty Horroh) | 3:40 |

Digital download – Sofia Reyes version
| No. | Title | Length |
|---|---|---|
| 1. | "Treehouse" (with Sofia Reyes) | 3:09 |

Digital download – Remix
| No. | Title | Length |
|---|---|---|
| 1. | "Treehouse" (R3hab remix) | 3:12 |

== Charts ==
| Chart (2019) | Peak position |
|---|---|
| Czech Republic (Rádio – Top 100) | 65 |
| New Zealand Heatseekers (RMNZ) | 22 |
| Scotland (OCC) | 81 |
| UK Singles Downloads (OCC) | 54 |

== Release history ==
| Region | Date | Format | Label |
|---|---|---|---|
| United Kingdom | 6 September 2019 | Digital download; streaming | Columbia |
