= Nobody (Martin Jensen and James Arthur song) =

Single by Martin Jensen and James Arthur
- Released: 1 March 2019
- Recorded: 2018
- Genre: Dance-pop
- Length: 3:31
- Label: Virgin
- Songwriter(s): Martin Jensen; Scott Harris; Mads Dyhrberg; Thom Bridges; Philip Plested
- Producer(s): Martin Jensen; Mads Dyhrberg

Martin Jensen singles chronology
"Somebody I'm Not" (2018)	"Nobody" (2019)	"Rubber Bands" (2019)

James Arthur singles chronology
"The Power of Love" (2018)	"Nobody" (2019)	"Falling Like the Stars" (2019)

"Nobody" is a song by Danish DJ and record producer Martin Jensen and British singer-songwriter James Arthur. It was released as a Digital download on 1 March 2019. The song peaked at number 52 on the UK Singles Chart. The song was written by Martin Jensen, Scott Harris, Mads Dyhrberg, Thom Bridges and Philip Plested.

== Music video ==
A music video to accompany the release of "Nobody" was first released onto YouTube on 26 March 2019 at a total length of three minutes and forty-seven seconds.

== Charts ==
=== Weekly charts ===
Chart (2019)	Peak position
Ireland (IRMA)	27
Lithuania (AGATA)	82
Scotland (OCC)	27
Sweden (Sverigetopplistan)	73
Switzerland (Schweizer Hitparade)	87
UK Singles (OCC)	52
US Hot Dance/Electronic Songs (Billboard)	19

=== Year-end charts ===
Chart (2019)	Position
US Hot Dance/Electronic Songs (Billboard)	97

== Certifications ==
Region	Certification	Certified units/sales
Brazil (Pro-Música Brasil)	Gold	20,000^{‡}
Denmark (IFPI Danmark)	Gold	45,000^{‡}
New Zealand (RMNZ)	Gold	15,000^{‡}
Norway (IFPI Norway)	Gold	30,000^{‡}
United Kingdom (BPI)	Silver	200,000^{‡}
Streaming
Sweden (GLF)	Gold	4,000,000^{†}
^{‡} Sales+streaming figures based on certification alone.^{†} Streaming-only figures based on certification alone.

== Release history ==
Region	Date	Format	Label
United Kingdom	1 March 2019	Digital download	Virgin Records
