= Bradley Spence =

British music producer

Bradley Spence is a British record producer and mixing engineer based at Dean Street Studios, in London.

Spence has produced albums for Jamiroquai, Mark Owen and Hero Fisher, tracks for Passenger and Alt-J as well as mixing for Kasabian, Chapel Club and Cosmicide. He has recently produced The Strypes album Little Victories, and rock band The Tones new track, "A.W.O.L".

In 2001, Spence began working at Matrix studios in London and then onto SARM studios; assisting Trevor Horn. While at SARM West Spence worked with Coldplay, Doves, Iron Maiden, Skin, Belle and Sebastian, Sikth, Seal and New Order. At SARM Hook End Studios, Spence worked with Radiohead, Stereophonics, Ian Brown, Russell Watson and The Beautiful South providing production, programming and engineering for recording sessions.

Spence has gone on to forge a partnership with fellow producer Charlie Russell, often working together under their joint venture production company name WTNSS.
