= Naked (James Arthur song) =

Single by James Arthur

from the album You
- Released: 24 November 2017
- Recorded: 2017
- Length: 3:54
- Label: Sony
- Songwriters: Max Martin; Savan Kotecha; James Arthur; Johan Carlsson
- Producer: Johan Carlsson

James Arthur singles chronology
"Sun Comes Up" (2017)	"Naked" (2017)	"You Can Cry" (2018)

"Naked" is a song recorded by British singer and songwriter James Arthur. The song was released as a digital download on 24 November 2017 in the United Kingdom by Sony Music, as the lead single from his third studio album, You. The song has peaked at number 11 on the UK Singles Chart. The song was written by Max Martin, Savan Kotecha, James Arthur and Johan Carlsson, the song was produced by Carlsson. As of 2021, it has sold 730,347 copies in the UK.

== Music video ==
An official music video to accompany the release of "Naked" was first released onto YouTube on 1 December 2017 at a total length of four minutes and one second. The video was directed by Mario Clement.

== Track listing ==
Digital download
No.	Title	Length
1.	"Naked"	3:54

Digital download – Remix
No.	Title	Length
1.	"Naked" (CADE Remix)	3:56

Digital download – Acoustic
No.	Title	Length
1.	"Naked" (acoustic version)	3:50

== Charts ==
=== Weekly charts ===
Chart (2017–2018)	Peak position
Austria (Ö3 Austria Top 40)	26
Belgium (Ultratop 50 Flanders)	38
Belgium (Ultratop 50 Wallonia)	18
Brazil (Crowley Charts)	84
Canada Hot 100 (Billboard)	86
Czech Republic Airplay (ČNS IFPI)	22
Czech Republic Singles Digital (ČNS IFPI)	55
Denmark (Tracklisten)	33
Euro Digital Song Sales (Billboard)	7
France (SNEP)	186
Germany (GfK)	23
Greece International (IFPI)	65
Hungary (Single Top 40)	36
Ireland (IRMA)	28
Italy (FIMI)	76
Latvia (DigiTop100)	55
Lebanon Airplay (Lebanese Top 20)	1
Netherlands (Single Top 100)	74
New Zealand Heatseekers (RMNZ)	2
Portugal (AFP)	30
Scotland Singles (OCC)	3
Singapore (RIAS)	29
Slovakia Airplay (ČNS IFPI)	28
Slovakia Singles Digital (ČNS IFPI)	59
Slovenia (SloTop50)	35
Sweden (Sverigetopplistan)	36
Switzerland (Schweizer Hitparade)	8
UK Singles (OCC)	11
US Bubbling Under Hot 100 (Billboard)	25
US Adult Contemporary (Billboard)	23
US Adult Pop Airplay (Billboard)	34

=== Year-end charts ===
Chart (2018)	Position
Belgium (Ultratop Wallonia)	88
Portugal (AFP)	82
Switzerland (Schweizer Hitparade)	82
Chart (2019)	Position
Portugal (AFP)	145

== Certifications ==
Region	Certification	Certified units/sales
Australia (ARIA)	Gold	35,000^{‡}
Brazil (Pro-Música Brasil)	2× Diamond	500,000^{‡}
Canada (Music Canada)	2× Platinum	160,000^{‡}
Denmark (IFPI Danmark)	Platinum	90,000^{‡}
France (SNEP)	Gold	100,000^{‡}
Germany (BVMI)	Platinum	400,000^{‡}
Italy (FIMI)	Platinum	50,000^{‡}
New Zealand (RMNZ)	Platinum	30,000^{‡}
Poland (ZPAV)	Gold	10,000^{‡}
Portugal (AFP)	2× Platinum	20,000^{‡}
Spain (PROMUSICAE)	Platinum	60,000^{‡}
Switzerland (IFPI Switzerland)	Platinum	20,000^{‡}
United Kingdom (BPI)	Platinum	600,000^{‡}
United States (RIAA)	Gold	500,000^{‡}
Streaming
Sweden (GLF)	Gold	4,000,000^{†}
^{‡} Sales+streaming figures based on certification alone.^{†} Streaming-only figures based on certification alone.

== See also ==
- List of number-one songs of 2018 (Lebanon)
