= You (James Arthur song) =

Single by James Arthur featuring Travis Barker

from the album You
- Released: 11 October 2019
- Recorded: 2019
- Length: 3:52
- Label: Columbia
- Songwriters: James Arthur; Travis Barker; George Tizzard; Rick Parkhouse
- Producer: Red Triangle

James Arthur singles chronology
"Finally Feel Good" (2019)	"You" (2019)	"Quite Miss Home" (2019)

Travis Barker singles chronology
"Long Live" (2019)	"You" (2019)	"I Love Me (Remix)" (2020)

Music video
- "You" on YouTube

"You" is a song by British singer-songwriter James Arthur, featuring drums from American musician Travis Barker of rock group Blink-182. It was released as a digital download and for streaming on 11 October 2019, as the sixth single from Arthur's third studio album, You. The song was written by James Arthur, Travis Barker, George Tizzard and Rick Parkhouse.

== Background ==
On 11 October 2019, Arthur announced the release of "You" on social media, saying, "#YOU with @travisbarker The baddest man to ever play the drums OUT NOW".

== Charts ==
Chart (2019–2020)	Peak position
Czech Republic Airplay (ČNS IFPI)	12
New Zealand Hot Singles (RMNZ)	30

== Certifications ==
Certifications for "You"
Region	Certification	Certified units/sales
Denmark (IFPI Danmark)	Gold	45,000^{‡}
^{‡} Sales+streaming figures based on certification alone.

== Release history ==
Region	Date	Format	Label
United Kingdom	11 October 2019	Digital download; streaming	Columbia
