= Lucy Spraggan discography =

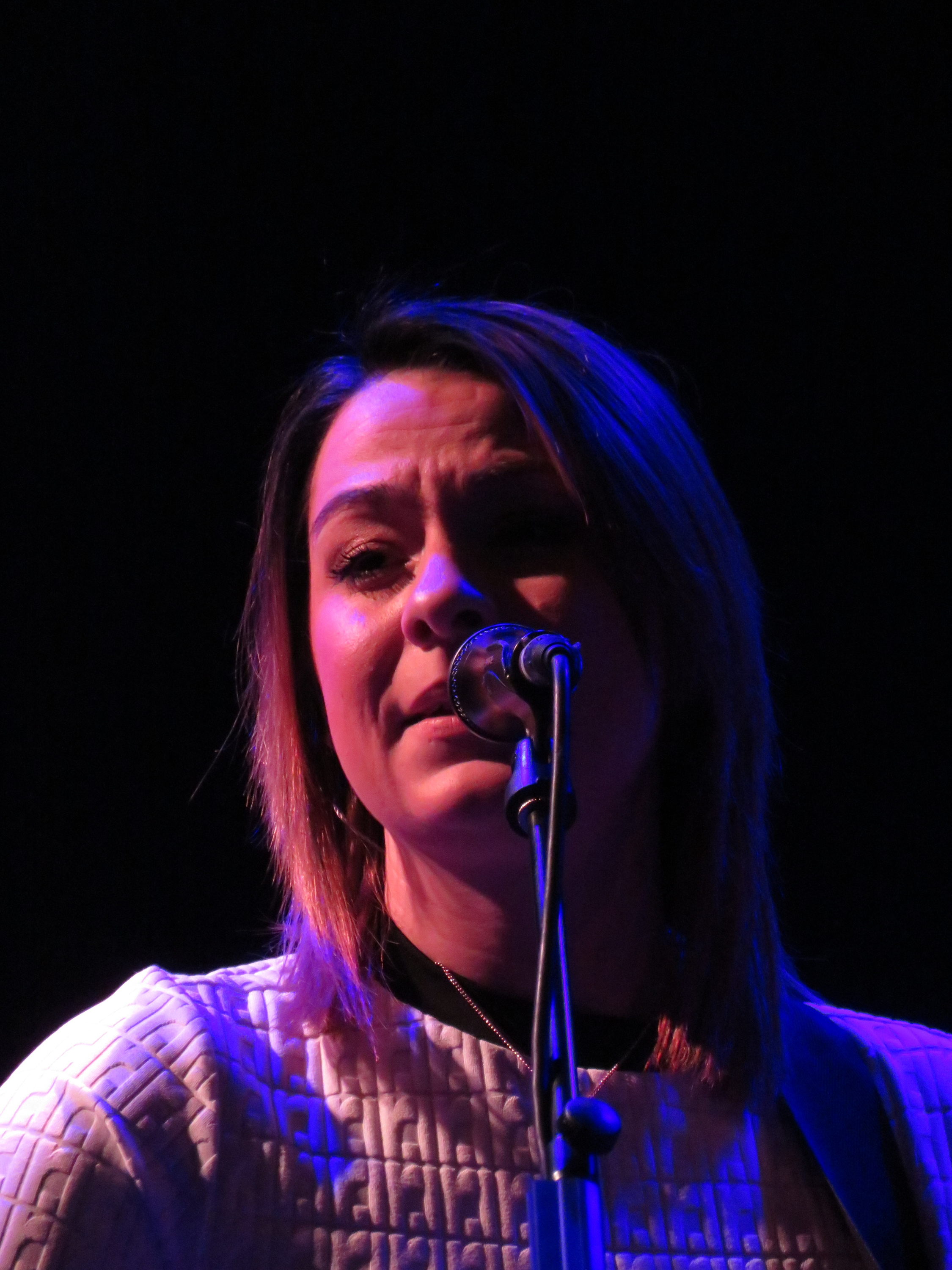
- Spraggan performing in 2019
- Studio albums: 7
- EPs: 1
- Singles: 20
- Music videos: 14

The discography of the English singer-songwriter Lucy Spraggan consists of 7 studio albums, 1 EP, 20 singles and 14 music videos. Her debut studio album, Top Room at the Zoo, was released in October 2011. The album peaked at number twenty-two on the UK Albums Chart. Her second studio album, Join the Club, was released in October 2013. The album peaked at number seven on the UK Albums Chart. The album includes the singles "Tea and Toast", "Lighthouse" and "Last Night (Beer Fear)". Her third studio album, We Are, was released in May 2015. The album peaked at number seventeen on the UK Albums Chart. The album includes the single "Unsinkable". Her fourth studio album, I Hope You Don't Mind Me Writing, was released in January 2017. The album peaked at number twelve on the UK Albums Chart. The album includes the singles "Dear You" and "Modern Day Frankenstein". Her fifth studio album, Today Was a Good Day, was released in May 2019. The album peaked at number twelve on the UK Albums Chart. The album includes the singles "Stick the Kettle On" and "Lucky Stars". Her sixth studio album, Choices, was released in February 2021. The album was preceded by singles "Flowers", "Sober" and "Roots". In December 2022, Spraggan released the single "Balance", taken from her forthcoming seventh studio album of the same name, released in August 2023.

== Albums ==
| Title | Details | Peak chart positions | | |
| Title | Details | UK | IRE | SCO |
|---|---|---|---|---|
| Top Room at the Zoo | Released: 20 October 2011 (UK); Label: Independent; Formats: Digital download, CD | 22 | 72 | 19 |
| Join the Club | Released: 7 October 2013 (UK); Label: Columbia; Formats: Digital download, CD, LP | 7 | 14 | 6 |
| We Are | Released: 4 May 2015 (UK); Label: Ctrl; Formats: Digital download, CD | 17 | — | — |
| I Hope You Don't Mind Me Writing | Released: 27 January 2017 (UK); Label: Ctrl; Formats: Digital download, CD, LP | 12 | — | 6 |
| Today Was a Good Day | Released: 3 May 2019 (UK); Label: Cooking Vinyl; Formats: Digital download, CD, LP | 12 | — | 3 |
| Choices | Released: 26 February 2021 (UK); Label: Cooking Vinyl; Formats: Digital download, CD, LP | 5 | — | 7 |
| Balance | Released: 11 August 2023 (UK); Label: Ctrl; Formats: Digital download, CD, LP | 24 | — | 8 |
| Other Sides of the Moon | Released: 20 June 2025 (UK); Label: Ctrl; Formats: Digital download, CD, LP | 36 | — | 6 |
"—" denotes an album that did not chart or was not released.

== Extended plays ==
| Title | Details |
|---|---|
| Home | Released: 8 February 2016; Label: CTRL Records; Formats: Digital download, CD |

== Singles ==
=== As lead artist ===
| Title | Year | Peak chart positions | | | | Album |
| Title | Year | UK | UK Digital | IRE | SCO | Album |
|---|---|---|---|---|---|---|
| "Tea and Toast" | 2012 | 50 | — | — | — | Join the Club |
| "Lighthouse" | 2013 | 26 | — | 21 | 14 | Join the Club |
| "Last Night (Beer Fear)" | 2013 | 11 (Note: Originally charting in 2012, after Spraggan's The X Factor audition, it peaked at number 2 on the chart update, but was subsequently removed from sale. It had, however, accumulated enough sales to debut at number 11 in the UK. The same was true in Ireland, where it charted at number 16. It was re-released in September 2013 by her new record label, Columbia, and reached number 18. It was included first on her debut album Top Room at the Zoo, and later on her major label debut Join the Club. Top Room at the Zoo reached #7 on the UK chart update before being removed from sale, as well.) | — | 16 | 11 | Join the Club |
| "Unsinkable" | 2015 | — | — | — | — | We Are |
| "Dear You" | 2016 | — | — | — | — | I Hope You Don't Mind Me Writing |
| "Modern Day Frankenstein" | 2016 | — | — | — | — | I Hope You Don't Mind Me Writing |
| "Drink 'Til We Go Home" | 2017 | — | 71 | — | 60 | Non-album single |
| "Stick the Kettle On" (featuring Scouting for Girls) | 2018 | — | — | — | — | Today Was a Good Day |
| "Lucky Stars" | 2019 | — | — | — | — | Today Was a Good Day |
| "Flowers" | 2020 | — | 93 | — | — | Choices |
| "Sober" | 2020 | — | — | — | — | Choices |
| "Roots" | 2020 | — | — | — | — | Choices |
| "Why Don't We Start From Here" (with The Dunwells) | 2021 | — | — | — | — | Choices |
| "Bring It All Back" | 2021 | — | — | — | — | Non-album singles |
| "All I Want for Christmas Is You" | 2021 | — | — | — | — | Non-album singles |
| "Everything Changes (Beer Fear Pt. II)" | 2022 | — | 57 | — | — | Balance |
| "Balance" | 2022 | — | 12 | — | — | Balance |
| "OCD" | 2023 | — | — | — | — | Balance |
| "Bodies" | 2023 | — | — | — | — | Balance |
| "Empire" | 2023 | — | — | — | — | Balance |
| "Sober" (featuring Robbie Williams) | 2024 | — | 58 | — | — | Other Sides of the Moon |
| "Other Sides of the Moon" | 2024 | — | — | — | — | Other Sides of the Moon |
| "Run" | 2024 | — | — | — | — | Other Sides of the Moon |
| "Unsinkable" | 2025 | — | — | — | — | Other Sides of the Moon |
"—" denotes a single that did not chart or was not released.

=== As featured artist ===
| Title | Year | Album |
|---|---|---|
| "Give Me Sunshine" (Santa Maradona F.C. featuring Lucy Spraggan) | 2014 | Non-album single |

=== Promotional singles ===
| Title | Year | Album |
|---|---|---|
| "I'm Gonna Be (500 Miles)" | 2020 | Non-album singles |
| "All the Things She Said" | 2020 | Non-album singles |
| "Animal (Skank Butcher Remix)" | 2021 | Non-album singles |

== Other charted songs ==
| Title | Year | Peak chart positions | | Album |
| Title | Year | UK | IRE | Album |
|---|---|---|---|---|
| "Someone" | 2012 | 137 | — | Top Room at the Zoo and Join the Club |
| "Butterflies" | 2013 | — | 61 | Top Room at the Zoo and Join the Club |
| "'91" | 2013 | — | 67 | Top Room at the Zoo and Join the Club |
"—" denotes a single that did not chart or was not released.

== Music videos ==
| Title | Year | Director |
|---|---|---|
| "Dreamer" (featuring J-Mac) | 2011 | Ollie Green & Daniel Entwistle |
| "Last Night" | 2012 | Damien Reeves |
| "Lighthouse" | 2013 | —N/a |
| "Last Night (Beer Fear)" | 2013 | Damien Reeves |
| "Mountains" | 2013 | Michael Baldwin |
| "Tea And Toast" | 2013 | —N/a |
| "Unsinkable" | 2015 | Damien Reeves |
| "Dear You" | 2016 | Damien Reeves & Lucy Spraggan |
| "Modern Day Frankenstein" | 2016 | Damien Reeves |
| "Drink 'Til We Go Home" | 2017 | —N/a |
| "Stick the Kettle On" | 2018 | —N/a |
| "Lucky Stars" | 2019 | —N/a |
| "Flowers" | 2020 | —N/a |
| "Sober" | 2020 | —N/a |
| "Balance" (Lyric video) | 2022 | Zak Rashid |
