= James Flannigan (songwriter) =

British songwriter, producer and musician

- Birth name: James Oliver Richard Flannigan
- Origin: London, England
- Occupation(s): Record producer, songwriter

James Oliver Richard Flannigan is a British songwriter, record producer and multi-instrumentalist.

== Career ==
Initially signed to Columbia Records as a member of pop punk band Stiff Dylans (as featured in teen film Angus, Thongs and Perfect Snogging). Flannigan found fame after being featured and performing in Gurinder Chadha's 2008 Paramount Pictures film Angus, Thongs and Perfect Snogging, Flannigan has since gone on to write and produce songs and albums with major artists such as Kodaline, Matt Maeson, Black Eyed Peas, Broods, Ben Abraham, Carly Rae Jepsen, Hayley Kiyoko, Andrew McMahon, Parachute, VERITE, MARINA, Mø, Weezer, Lana Del Rey and Dua Lipa.

Notable productions and co-writes include Kodaline's "All I Want", "Hallucinogenics" by Matt Maeson featuring Lana Del Rey, Hayley Kiyoko's "Girls like Girls", MARINA's final album with Atlantic Records, Ancient Dreams in a Modern Land, and the Weezer EP SZNZ: Winter.

He has also had his music feature in TV shows and film, including The Fault in Our Stars, Kick-Ass 2, Grey's Anatomy, Justin and the Knights of Valour and Red Band Society.

== Songwriting and production credits ==
Title	Year	Artist	Album	Songwriter	Producer			
Title	Year	Artist	Album	Songwriter	Primary	Secondary	Additional	Vocal
"All I Want"	2012	Kodaline	The Kodaline EP	check				
"Don't Panic"	2012	Lena	Stardust	check				
"Rich Youth"	2013	Hayley Kiyoko	A Belle to Remember EP	check	check			
"Speed the Fire"	2013	Bo Bruce	Before I Sleep	check	check			
"Lightkeeper"	2013	Bo Bruce	Before I Sleep		check			
"The Fall"	2013	Bo Bruce	Before I Sleep		check			
"Golden"	2013	Bo Bruce	Before I Sleep	check	check			
"All I Want"	2013	Kodaline	In a Perfect World	check				
"Lighthouse"	2013	Lucy Spraggan	Join the Club	check	check			
"Last Night (Beer Fear)"	2013	Lucy Spraggan	Join the Club		check			
"Someone"	2013	Lucy Spraggan	Join the Club		check			
"Tea & Toast"	2013	Lucy Spraggan	Join the Club		check			
"91"	2013	Lucy Spraggan	Join the Club		check			
"The Tourist"	2013	Lucy Spraggan	Join the Club		check			
"In a State"	2013	Lucy Spraggan	Join the Club		check			
"Wait for Me"	2013	Lucy Spraggan	Join the Club	check	check			
"Let Go"	2013	Lucy Spraggan	Join the Club		check			
"Join the Club"	2013	Lucy Spraggan	Join the Club		check			
"You're Too Young"	2013	Lucy Spraggan	Join the Club		check			
"Rockliffe Bay"	2013	Lucy Spraggan	Join the Club		check			
"If I Had the Money"	2013	Lucy Spraggan	Join the Club		check			
"Butterflies"	2013	Lucy Spraggan	Join the Club		check			
"Safe"	2013	Lucy Spraggan	Join the Club		check			
"Cecilia and the Satellite"	2014	Andrew McMahon	Andrew McMahon in the Wilderness	check	check			
"High Dive"	2014	Andrew McMahon	Andrew McMahon in the Wilderness		check			
"Canyon Moon"	2014	Andrew McMahon	Andrew McMahon in the Wilderness		check			
"This Side of Paradise"	2014	Hayley Kiyoko	This Side of Paradise EP		check			
"See Her on the Weekend"	2014	Andrew McMahon	Andrew McMahon in the Wilderness		check			
"All Our Lives"	2014	Andrew McMahon	Andrew McMahon in the Wilderness		check			
"Black and White Movies"	2014	Andrew McMahon	Andrew McMahon in the Wilderness		check			
"Driving Through a Dream"	2014	Andrew McMahon	Andrew McMahon in the Wilderness		check			
"Halls"	2014	Andrew McMahon	Andrew McMahon in the Wilderness		check			
"Map for the Gateway"	2014	Andrew McMahon	Andrew McMahon in the Wilderness	check	check			
"Given It All"	2015	Hayley Kiyoko	This Side of Paradise EP	check	check			
"Cliff's Edge"	2015	Hayley Kiyoko	This Side of Paradise EP		check			
"Girls Like Girls"	2015	Hayley Kiyoko	This Side of Paradise EP		check			
"Feeding the Fire"	2015	Hayley Kiyoko	This Side of Paradise EP	check	check			
"Lucky Ones"	2015	The Dunwells	Lucky Ones EP	check	check			
"All I Want"	2015	Collabro	Act Two	check				
"What Side of Love"	2016	Parachute	Wide Awake	check				
"Hey Now"	2016	The Dunwells	Light Up the Sky	check	check			
"Found"	2016	Seramic	Found EP	check				
"If"	2017	Lucy Spraggan	I Hope You Don't Mind Me Writing	check				
"Tightrope"	2017	LPX	Bolt in the Blue EP	check	check			
"Tremble"	2017	LPX	Bolt in the Blue EP	check	check			
"Begging"	2017	Dua Lipa	Dua Lipa	check	check			
"Somewhere in Between"	2017	VERITE	Somewhere in Between	check	check			
"Slide"	2017	LPX	Bolt in the Blue EP	check	check			
"Bolt in the Blue"	2018	LPX	Bolt in the Blue EP	check	check			
"Fog and the Fear"	2018	LPX	Bolt in the Blue EP		check			
"Red Queen"	2018	LPX	Bolt in the Blue EP		check			
"Us" (featuring Daniels)	2018	What So Not	Not All the Beautiful Things				check	
"Hallucinogenics"	2018	Matt Maeson	The Hearse EP	check				
"Put it on Me"	2018	Matt Maeson	The Hearse EP	check				
"The Hearse"	2018	Matt Maeson	The Hearse EP	check				
"Cliffy"	2018	Matt Maeson	The Hearse EP	check				
"Unconditional"	2018	Matt Maeson	The Hearse EP	check				
"Mr. Rattlebone"	2018	Matt Maeson	The Hearse EP	check				
"Wishing You Away"	2018	Holychild	TBA	check				
"Big Love"	2018	Black Eyed Peas	Masters of the Sun Vol. 1	check				
"Carmelo"	2018	Holychild	TBA	check				
"Mercy" (featuring What So Not and Two Feet)	2018	MØ	Forever Neverland	check	check			
"To Belong"	2019	Broods	Don't Feed the Pop Monster	check	check			
"No Drug Like Me"	2019	Carly Rae Jepsen	Dedicated	check				
"End of the Earth"	2019	Marina	Love + Fear	check	check			
"No More Suckers"	2019	Marina	Love + Fear	check	check			
"Real Love"	2019	Carly Rae Jepsen	Dedicated	check	check			check
"Solo"	2020	Carly Rae Jepsen	Dedicated Side B	check	check			
"Purge the Poison"	2021	Marina	Ancient Dreams in a Modern Land					check
"Ancient Dreams in a Modern Land"	2021	Marina	Ancient Dreams in a Modern Land		check			
"Venus Fly Trap"	2021	Marina	Ancient Dreams in a Modern Land		check			
"Highly Emotional People"	2021	Marina	Ancient Dreams in a Modern Land		check			
"New America"	2021	Marina	Ancient Dreams in a Modern Land		check			
"Pandora's Box"	2021	Marina	Ancient Dreams in a Modern Land		check			
"Flowers"	2021	Marina	Ancient Dreams in a Modern Land		check			
"Goodbye"	2021	Marina	Ancient Dreams in a Modern Land		check			
"I Want A Dog"	2022	Weezer	SZNZ: Winter		check			
"Iambic Pentameter"	2022	Weezer	SZNZ: Winter		check			
"Basketball"	2022	Weezer	SZNZ: Winter		check			
"Sheraton Commander"	2022	Weezer	SZNZ: Winter		check			
"Dark Enough to See the Stars"	2022	Weezer	SZNZ: Winter		check			
"The One That Got Away"	2022	Weezer	SZNZ: Winter		check			
"The Deep and Dreamless Sleep"	2022	Weezer	SZNZ: Winter		check			
