= Big Hits 2012 =

- Origin: 2011
- Genres: Pop
- Years active: 2012
- Labels: Big Hits 2012

Big Hits 2012 is a cover band. They had four hits: a pre-release cover version of Sam and the Womp's "Bom Bom" made No. 65 on the UK Singles Chart, Ne-Yo's "Let Me Love You" was taken to No. 61 by them in the form of a pre-release cover version and Lucy Spraggan's tracks "Tea and Toast" and "Last Night" were taken to No. 52 and No. 74 on the UK Singles Chart by them after Spraggan was asked to remove her EP Top Room at the Zoo from iTunes.

== Discography ==
Song	Original artist	UK Singles Chart position	Reference
"Bom Bom"	Sam and the Womp	65	
"Let Me Love You"	Ne-Yo	61	
"Tea and Toast"	Lucy Spraggan	52	
"Last Night"	Lucy Spraggan	74	
