= Jennifer Decilveo =

American musician, songwriter, and producer

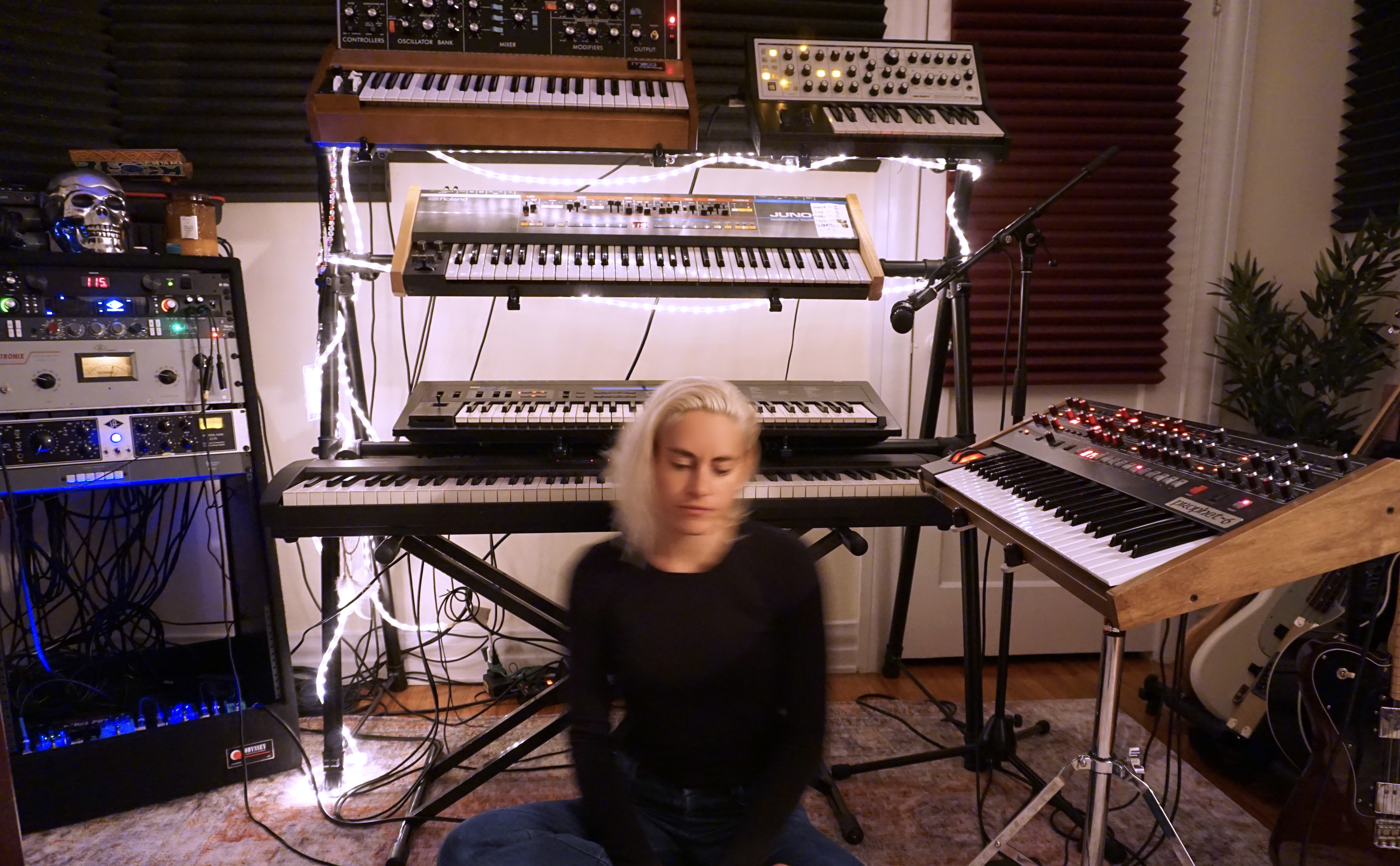
- Decilveo in her studio in 2012

Background information
- Born: Jennifer Decilveo; New Jersey, United States
- Genres: Pop; alternative rock; Americana; electronic
- Occupations: Record producer, songwriter, composer
- Instruments: Piano, bass guitar, synthesizer, vocals, percussion
- Years active: 2015–present

Jennifer Decilveo is an American Grammy-winning, Brit and Mercury Prize-nominated record producer, multi-instrumentalist, and songwriter. Her production and songwriting credits include Beth Ditto of The Gossip, Bat for Lashes, Andra Day, Porridge Radio, Miley Cyrus, Hozier, Fletcher, Melanie Martinez, Anne-Marie, Albert Hammond Jr. of The Strokes, The Wombats, Phantogram, Marina, Lucius, White Reaper, and Angelique Kidjo. Decilveo co-wrote and produced Andra Day's "Rise Up" on her critically acclaimed album Cheers to the Fall. The album was nominated for Best R&B Album and the album's main single, "Rise Up", was nominated for Best R&B Performance at the 2016 Grammy Awards. Decilveo and Day are winners of BET's 2016 Soul Train Music Awards The Ashford & Simpson Songwriter's Award. Decilveo also produced Marina's Man's World which was nominated for the 2021 Ivor Novello Awards for Best Song Musically and Lyrically.

== Biography ==
Decilveo was born in New Jersey. She graduated from Lehigh University with a degree in finance from the College of Business and Economics.

== Awards and nominations ==
=== Mercury Prize ===
Year	Nominee / work	Award	Result
2020	Porridge Radio - Every Bad	Mercury Prize	Nominated

=== Brit Awards ===
Year	Nominee / work	Award	Result
2019	Anne Marie - Speak Your Mind	British Album of the Year	Nominated

=== Ivor Novello Awards ===
Year	Nominee / work	Award	Result
2021	Marina - Man's World	Best Song Musically and Lyrically	Nominated

=== BET Awards ===
Year	Nominee / work	Award	Result
2016	Andra Day - Rise Up	Centric Award	Nominated

=== Grammy Awards ===
Year	Nominee / work	Award	Result
2016	Andra Day - Rise Up	Best R&B Performance	Nominated
2016	Andra Day - Cheers to the Fall	Best R&B Album	Nominated
2022	Angelique Kidjo - Mother Nature	Global Music Album	Won

=== Soul Train Awards ===
Year	Nominee / work	Award	Result
2016	Rise Up	The Ashford & Simpson Songwriter's Award	Won

== Discography ==
=== Producer and writer discography ===
Year	Artist	Song	Album	Label
2026	Chelsea Wolfe	Cold Seethe Humours Swallower Halo The Dark Turn The Key Im Not There Death Is Not the End Dancer in the Sky	The Dark	Loma Vista
2026	Freya Ridings	Dancing In The Kitchen Undefeated R U OK? Battleship Wicker Woman	Mother of Pearl	BMG
2026	Alice Merton	Ignorance Is Bliss Coasting Visions Cruel Intentions Boogie Man Mirage Jane Street On the Wire Willow Trees in Tokyo Landline Marigold Treasure Island	Visions	Paper Plane Records
2026	Diana Silvers	Mediation No.1	TBA	Capitol Records
2026	Gayle	Bite the Bullet	Observing Chaos	Atlantic Records
2025	Violent Vira	Intro Missing Posters Burn Me With A Bible Eat Indie Common Decency Lil Crush Wave In The Monitor Interlude Saccharine Trap Nest S.E.X. Narcissist You Promised Chasing Ghosts	Lover Of A Ghost	Mom + Pop Music
2025	Fletcher	Party High Everyone Leave Please Don't Tempt Me The Arsonist Boy Chaos Distance Good Girl/Gone Girl All of the Women Would You Still Love Me If You Really Knew Me?	Would You Still Love Me If You Really Knew Me?	Capitol Records
2025	Rise Against	I Want It All Ricochet Prizefighter	Ricochet	Loma Vista
2025	Sekou	Keep My Love	In A World We Dont Belong	Island Records
2025	Maude Latour	Sugar Water	Sugar Water Deluxe	Warner Records
2025	Gatlin	Kissimmee Jesus Christ & Country Clubs	The Eldest Daughter	Dualtone Records
2025	Sasami ft. Soccer Mommy	Just be Friends	Blood on the Silver Screen	Domino
2024	Phantogram	Ashes	Memory of a Day	Neon Gold Records
2024	Hinds ft. Beck	Boom Boom Back	Viva Hinds	Lucky Number
2024	Kylie Minogue	Diamonds Dance to the Music	Tension II	BMG
2024	Deb Never	I'm Not In Love	Thank You For Attending	Giant Records
2024	Hozier	Fare Well	Unheard	Columbia Records
2024	Sasami	Honeycrash Slugger Just Be Friends I'll Be Gone Love Makes You Do Crazy Things Possessed Figure It Out For The Weekend Smoke (Banished From Eden) Nothing But A Sad Face On Lose It All	Blood on the Silver Screen	Domino
2024	Maude Latour	Comedown Infinite Roses Save Me	Sugarwater	Warner Records
2024	Fletcher	Doing Better Ego Talking Two Things Can Be True Eras of Us Attached To You Crush Joyride	In Search of the Antidote	Capitol Records
2023	Hozier	Francesca I, Carrion (Icarian) Butchered Tongue	Unreal Unearth	Columbia Records
2023	Cold War Kids	Blame	Cold War Kids	AWAL
2023	Fletcher	Eras of Us	In Search of the Antidote	Capitol Records
2023	Take That	Brand New Sun The Champion Time and Time Again	This Life	EMI Records
2023	Royal and the Serpent	Junkie Slug Utopia	Rat Trap 2: the burn	Atlantic Records
2023	Charlotte Cardin	Enfer	99 Nights	Atlantic Records
2023	Cannons	Crybaby	Heartbeat Highway	Columbia Records
2023	Lola Young	What Is It About Me	My Mind Wanders and Sometimes Leaves Completely	Island Records
2023	Miley Cyrus	Island	Endless Summer Vacation	Columbia Records
2023	Crawlers	This Time of Year Always Messiah	The Mess We Seem To Make	Polydor Records
2023	Gigi Perez	Kill For You When She Smiles Balsam Fir Glue The Man	How To Catch A Falling Knife	Interscope Records
2023	White Reaper	Asking For A Ride Funny Farm Getting Into Trouble w/ the Boss Pink Slip Heaven or Not Thorn Pages	Asking For A Ride	Elektra Records
2023	Taylor Janzen	Nightmare Something Better	I Live In Patterns	Glassnote Records
2022	Hozier	Swan Upon Leda	Unreal Unearth	Columbia Records
2022	White Reaper	Pages	Asking for a Ride	Elektra Records
2022	Fletcher	Girl of My Dreams Sting Serial Heartbreaker	Girl of My Dreams	Capitol Records
2022	Miley Cyrus	High	Attention: Miley Live	Columbia Records
2022	Mark Owen	You Only Want Me Rio Boy Last of the Heroes Magic Being Human	Land of Dreams	BMG Records
2022	Royal and the Serpent	Death of Me Love Abuser (Save Me)	Happiness Is An Inside Job	Atlantic Records
2022	Christina Perri	Surrender Hurt Evergone Back in Time ft.Ben Rector Home People Like You Fever Blue I Do It For You Mothers Fighter Tiny Victories Time of Our Lives Roses in the Rain	A Lighter Shade of Blue	Elektra Records
2022	Marina	Pink Convertible	Ancient Dreams in a Modern Land	Atlantic Records
2022	Max Frost	Head In The Clouds Cool Kids Rings Star Change Shape Walking In The Stars	Flying Machines	Nettwerk
2022	George Cosby	Man On A Road	Man On A Road	Columbia Records
2022	The Greeting Committee ft.Briston Maroney	Sort of Stranger	Dandelion	Harvest Records
2022	Alice Merton	Mania	Sides	Mom + Pop Music
2022	Amos Lee	Dreamland	Dreamland	ATO Records
2022	Seulgi	Los Angeles	28 Reasons	SM Entertainment
2022	Ella Jane	Party Trick	Marginalia	Fader
2022	Hannah Diamond	Staring at the Ceiling	Perfect Picture	PC Music
2022	Lucius	White Lies Dance Around It LSD	Second Nature	Mom + Pop
2022	Valerie June	Use Me	TBA	Concord
2022	Cat and Calmell	Cry	TBA	EMI Music Australia
2022	Caitlyn Smith	High	High and Low	Monument Records
2022	Ella Henderson	Brave	Everything I Didn't Say	Atlantic Records
2021	Christina Perri	Songs For Rosie	Songs For Rosie	Atlantic Records
2021	Angelique Kidjo	Mother Nature	Mother Nature	Sony Records
2021	Imelda May	Different Kinds of Love	11 Past The Hour	Decca Records
2021	Betta Lemme	Girls	TBA	Ultra Records
2021	The Greeting Committee	Can I Leave Me Too? Float Away Dandelion Bird Hall Make Out So It Must Be True Wrapped Inside of Your Arms Ada How Long? Ten	Dandelion	Harvest Records
2021	Marina	Purge the Poison I Love You but I Love Me More	Ancient Dreams in a Modern Land	Atlantic Records
2021	Shura	Obsession	Forevher	Secretly Canadian
2021	Cherry Glazerr	Big Bang	TBA	Secretly Canadian
2020	Cherry Glazerr	Rabbit Hole	TBA	Secretly Canadian
2020	Miley Cyrus	High	Plastic Hearts	RCA Records
2020	Anne-Marie	Problems	TBA	Atlantic Records
2020	Marina	Man's World	Ancient Dreams in a Modern Land	Atlantic Records
2020	Deep Sea Diver ft. Sharon Van Etten	Impossible Weight	Impossible Weight	ATO Records
2020	Sea Girls	Lie To Me	Open Up Your Head	Polydor Records
2020	Fletcher	Feel	The S(ex) Tapes	Capitol Records
2020	The Score	Golden Fire	Carry On	Republic Records
2020	Phem	Self Control	Self Control	Caroline Records
2020	Hinds	Spanish Bombs	Spanish Bombs	Mom + Pop Music
2020	Sam Fischer ft. Anne-Marie	This City	TBA	RCA Records
2020	Demi Lovato	I Love Me	Dancing With the Devil	Island Records; Hollywood Records
2020	Hinds	Good Bad Times Just Like Kids (Miau) Riding Solo Boy Come Back And Love Me <3 Burn Take Me Back The Play Waiting For You This Moment Forever	The Prettiest Curse	Mom + Pop Music
2020	Porridge Radio	Sweet	Every Bad	Secretly Canadian
2020	Caitlyn Smith	Long Time Coming Fly Away	Supernova	Monument Records
2020	Bloxx	Lie Out Loud Coming Up Short Go Out With You 5000 Miles Thinking About Yourself Off My Mind Give Me The Keys Hey Jenny Changes It Won't Work Out What You Needed Swimming	Lie Out Loud	Chess Club
2019	Hinds	Riding Solo	The Prettiest Curse	Mom + Pop Music
2019	Fletcher	All Love	You Ruined New York City for Me	Capitol Records
2019	Bat for Lashes	Desert Man Feel For You Peach Sky	Lost Girls	AWAL
2019	Meg Myers	Some People	Take Me to the Disco	300 Entertainment
2019	Joseph	Fighter Shivers	Good Luck, Kid	ATO Records
2019	Ben Platt	Bad Habit Ease My Mind Temporary Love Honest Man Better Share Your Address In Case You Don't Live Forever Older Runaway	Sing to Me Instead	Atlantic Records
2019	Olivia O'Brien	Almost In Love	It Was A Sad Fucking Summer	Island Records
2018	Bibi Bourelly	White House	TBA	Def Jam Recordings
2018	Anne-Marie	Perfect To Me	Speak Your Mind	Asylum Records
2018	Roses Gabor	Perfect Magnitude	Fantasy & Facts	Believe Digital
2018	Banoffee	Bubble	Bubble	Remote Control Records
2018	Piso 21	Besándote	Ubuntu	Warner Music Mexico
2018	Anne-Marie	Cry Ciao Adios Can I Get Your Number Perfect Some People Used To Love You	Speak Your Mind	Asylum Records
2018	Rae Morris	Rose Garden	Someone Out There	Atlantic Records
2018	Albert Hammond Jr.	Muted Beatings	Francis Trouble	Vagrant Records
2018	The Wombats	Cheetah Tongue White Eyes	Beautiful People Will Ruin Your Life	14th Floor Records
2018	Dusky Grey	A Little Bit	A Little Bit	Atlantic Records
2018	Flight Facilities	Need You	Need You	Future Classic
2018	Bipolar Sunshine	Pressure	Imaginarium	Interscope Records
2018	Diana Gordon	The Hard Way	The Hard Way	4AD
2018	Jeanne Added	Mutate	Radiate	Naïve Records
2018	Talos	See Me	See Me	Sony BMG
2017	Anne-Marie	Ciao Adios	Speak Your Mind	Asylum Records
2017	Beth Ditto	Fire In and Out Fake Sugar Savoir Faire We Could Run Oo La La Go Baby Go Oh My God Love in Real Life Do You Want Me To? Lover Clouds (Song for John)	Fake Sugar	Virgin Records
2017	Dan Owen	Moonlight	Open Hands and Enemies	Atlantic Records
2017	NCT 127	Cherry Bomb	Cherry Bomb	S.M. Entertainment
2017	LPX	Slide	Bolt in the Blue	Neon Gold Records
2016	Skizzy Mars	Feel It Loud	Alone Together	Atlantic Records
2016	Martina Stoessel	Great Escape	Tini	Hollywood Records
2016	Madison Beer	Something Sweet	Something Sweet	Island Records
2016	Andra Day	Rise Up	Cheers for the Fall	Warner Brothers
2016	Cash Cash ft. Sofía Reyes	How to Love	Blood, Sweat & 3 Years	Atlantic Records
2016	Rebecca Ferguson	Superwoman	Without A Woman	RCA Records
2015	Julian Moon	2AM	Good Girl	Warner Bros. Records
2015	Leslie Clio	Changes	Eureka	Universal Records
2015	Andreya Triana	Keep Running	Giants	Ninja Tune Records
2015	Phases	Silhouette Part of Me	For Life	Warner Bros. Records
2015	Galantis	Forever Tonight "In My Head"	Pharmacy	Atlantic Records
2015	Ryn Weaver	Here Is Home Free Sail On	The Fool	Interscope Records
2015	The Royal Concept	Just Wanna Be Loved By U	Smile	Republic Records
2015	Machine Gun Kelly	Merry Go Round	General Admission	Interscope Records
2015	Andra Day	Rise Up	Cheers to the Fall	Warner Bros. Records
2015	Melanie Martinez	Play Date	Cry Baby	Atlantic Records
2015	Clare Dunn	Ferrari	Clare Dunn	MCA Nashville Records
2015	Brodinski ft Maluca	Bury Me	Brodinski	Bromance records
2015	Mr Little Jeans	Waking Up	Waking Up	Mr Little Jeans
