= Venus Fly Trap (song) =

2021 single by Marina

Single by Marina

from the album Ancient Dreams in a Modern Land
- Released: 9 June 2021
- Genre: Pop
- Length: 2:38
- Label: Atlantic
- Songwriter: Marina Diamandis
- Producers: Marina Diamandis; James Flannigan

Marina singles chronology
"Ancient Dreams in a Modern Land" (2021)	"Venus Fly Trap" (2021)	"Butterfly" (2025)

Music video
- "Venus Fly Trap" on YouTube

"Venus Fly Trap" is a song written and recorded by Welsh singer-songwriter Marina for her fifth studio album, Ancient Dreams in a Modern Land (2021). It was released as the project's fourth single on 9 June 2021, through Atlantic Records, and was produced by Marina and James Flannigan. A Kito remix featuring Swedish singer Tove Lo was released on 16 July.

== Background and release ==
"Venus Fly Trap" was released for digital download and streaming on 9 June 2021, as the parent album's fourth single. It was the final song to premiere ahead of the album's release, and was originally teased one month prior with previous single "Ancient Dreams in a Modern Land". Marina is the sole songwriter of "Venus Fly Trap", and produced it with James Flannigan. The music video for "Venus Fly Trap" debuted alongside the single, and was directed by Weird Life Films.

On 16 July 2021, a remix by Australian producer and DJ Kito featuring Swedish singer-songwriter Tove Lo was released. Additional writing was handled by Lo.

== Composition and lyrics ==
"Venus Fly Trap" is a funk-influenced pop song. The chorus consists of Marina asking: "Why be a wallflower when you can be a Venus fly trap?" Other lyrics in the song are "unexpectedly" personal, particularly "I know that money ain't important, and it don't mean you're the best / But I earned it all myself, and I'm a millionairess", according to NME's Nick Levine. He also summarized the message as a "tongue-in-cheek self empowerment banger" that makes reference to her second studio album, Electra Heart (2012). Clash's Jessica Fynn shared a similar view, opining that Marina "lyrically revive[d]" herself from the era. Feeling it was reminiscent of "Ancient Dreams in a Modern Land", Red Dziri from The Line of Best Fit said "Venus Fly Trap" shared the same energy, but that it was "more hectic" and sassy.

== Reception ==
According to the Official Charts Company, "Venus Fly Trap" peaked at number 31 on the Singles Sales chart, which ranks the best-selling songs of the week. It also reached number 3 on the Physical Singles chart, and was the highest-performing Vinyl Singles entry for the week of 20 May 2022, becoming her second number one on the chart following "Purge the Poison". In the US, the song entered two Billboard radio charts. It debuted on the Rock Airplay chart at number 38 on the publication dated 10 July 2021. On the Billboard Alternative Airplay chart, a component chart of Rock Airplay, the song reached a slightly higher peak at number 34.

== Live performances ==
MARINA first performed the "Venus Fly Trap" as part of the setlist of Ancient Dreams: Live from the Desert, a virtual concert broadcast a day after the album's release. She also performed the song on Late Night with Seth Meyers on 14 June 2021.

== Track listing ==
- Digital download
1. "Venus Fly Trap" – 2:38
- Blossom Remix
1. "Venus Fly Trap" (Blossom Remix) – 3:28
- Kito Remix - Featuring Tove Lo
1. "Venus Fly Trap" (Kito Remix) [featuring Tove Lo] – 2:43

== Charts ==
Chart performance for "Venus Fly Trap"
Chart (2021–2022)	Peak position
UK Singles Sales (OCC)	31
US Rock Airplay (Billboard)	38

== Release history ==
Release dates and formats for "Venus Fly Trap"
Region	Date	Format(s)	Version	Label	Ref.
Various	9 June 2021	Digital download; streaming	Original	Atlantic	
Various	30 June 2021	Digital download; streaming	Blossom remix	Atlantic	
Various	16 July 2021	Digital download; streaming	Kito remix	Atlantic	
