= Someone (Lucy Spraggan song) =

Song by Lucy Spraggan

from the album Top Room at the Zoo, Join the Club and Local Talent
- Released: 17 September 2012
- Recorded: 2012
- Genre: Indie pop
- Length: 2:27
- Label: Hypertension Music

"Someone" is a song by English musician Lucy Spraggan. The song was released in the United Kingdom as a digital download on 17 September 2012. It initially appeared on Spraggan's first independent album Top Room at the Zoo (2011), and then on her major-label debut Join the Club (2013). The song is also included on an album titled Local Talent which features 56 local UK artists including Spraggan. The song peaked at number 137 on the UK Singles Chart and number 16 on the UK Indie Chart.

== Track listing ==
Digital download
No.	Title	Length
1.	"Someone"	2:27

== Chart performance ==
Chart (2012)	Peak position
UK Singles (Official Charts Company)	137
UK Indie (Official Charts)	16

== Release history ==
Region	Date	Format	Label
United Kingdom	17 September 2012	Digital download	Hypertension Music
