= Purge the Poison =

2021 single by Marina

Single by Marina

from the album Ancient Dreams in a Modern Land
- Released: 14 April 2021
- Genre: Pop; electropop; power pop
- Length: 3:16
- Label: Atlantic
- Songwriter(s): Marina Diamandis
- Producer(s): Jennifer Decilveo

Marina singles chronology
"Man's World" (2020)	"Purge the Poison" (2021)	"Ancient Dreams in a Modern Land" (2021)

Music video
- "Purge the Poison" on YouTube

"Purge the Poison" is a song written and recorded by Welsh singer-songwriter Marina for her fifth studio album, Ancient Dreams in a Modern Land (2021). It was released as the project's second single on 14 April 2021, through Atlantic Records, alongside the album's announcement. The song was produced by Jennifer Decilveo and previously teased by Marina in 2020. It was promoted through the creation of a news alert website called AllMyFriendsAreWitches.com. The song is a guitar-heavy pop, electropop, and power pop anthem, sung from the point-of-view of Mother Nature. Its lyrics preach about a better society, that is free of capitalism, climate change, and patriarchy.

"Purge the Poison" was highlighted by music critics, with some praising its catchiness. Others compared it to older works in her catalogue. The accompanying music video was released simultaneously with the song and directed by Weird Life Films. It features Marina dancing in an ensemble of colorful outfits. An alternative version of "Purge the Poison", featuring Pussy Riot's Nadezhda Tolokonnikova, was released on 5 May.

== Background and release ==
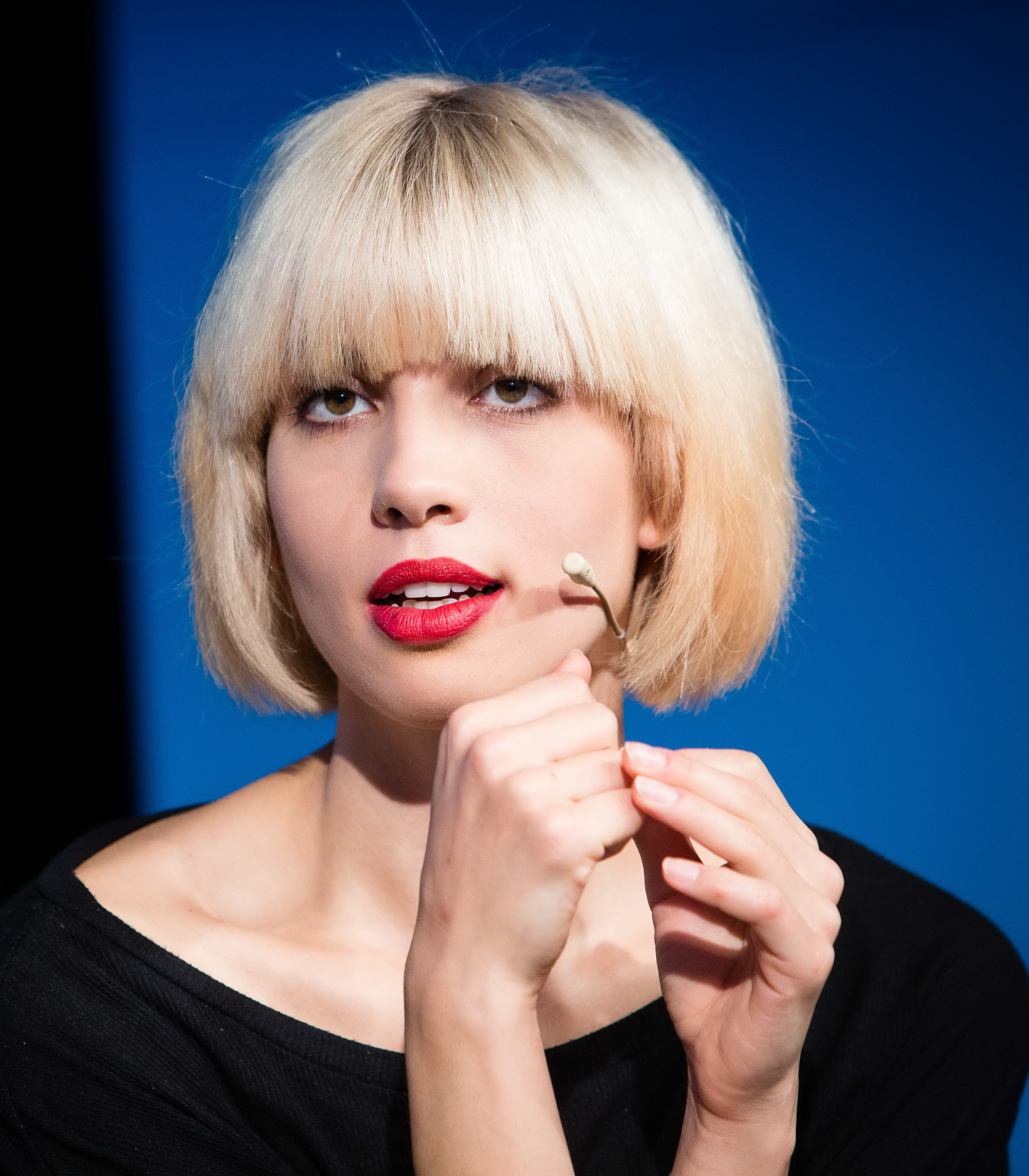
The alternate version of "Purge the Poison" features guest vocals from Pussy Riot's Nadezhda Tolokonnikova (shown in 2015).

In January 2020, Marina took to her social media accounts, revealing that she had been working on her fifth studio album. In regards to the project, she expressed desire to collaborate with an all-female creative team, differing from her previous experiences while recording her fourth studio album, Love + Fear (2019). Following the release of the lead single, "Man's World" in 2020, Marina posted several teasers of other songs from her fifth album's recording sessions, such as "Flowers" and a clip from a track about Venus flytrap plants. Previously, in May 2020, Marina shared a snippet of a demo of "Purge the Poison" to her Twitter account, along with a verse of lyrics. She had wanted to release singles in support of her album as early as April 2020, but changed plans following the onset of the COVID-19 pandemic.

Marina wrote "Purge the Poison" by herself, with Jennifer Decilveo serving as its sole producer. The two met during a lunch date at Marina's house, with the latter's name provided in a recommendation. In The New York Times, Decilveo expressed her excitement to work with another woman: "I'm one of the only female producers in the business, and we spoke each other's language. She's the real deal and, in this strange pop market, it's refreshing to have somebody with lyrics that are going against the grain." Two days prior to the song's release, Marina launched a website called AllMyFriendsAreWitches.com, where fans could enter their phone numbers to receive updates regarding Marina's music; it was supported with the hashtag campaign #PurgethePoison, and the song was announced later that day. It was officially released on 14 April 2021 for digital download and streaming, through Atlantic Records. The title of the fifth album, Ancient Dreams in a Modern Land, was announced simultaneously, along with a tentative 11 June 2021 release date.

An official alternate version of "Purge the Poison", featuring Russian group Pussy Riot, was released on 5 May 2021. It contains guest vocals from member Nadezhda Tolokonnikova, who adds a new verse to the song. Regarding her thoughts on the original song, Tolokonnikova wrote in a statement that she was "blown away by [the] track" and enjoyed how "it feeds your brain with the right questions and encourages you to think." Set for release on 29 October 2021 is a limited edition 7" single of "Purge the Poison". The glow-in-the-dark-coloured release is limited to 4,000 copies and contains the Pussy Riot version of the song as its B-side.

== Composition and lyrics ==
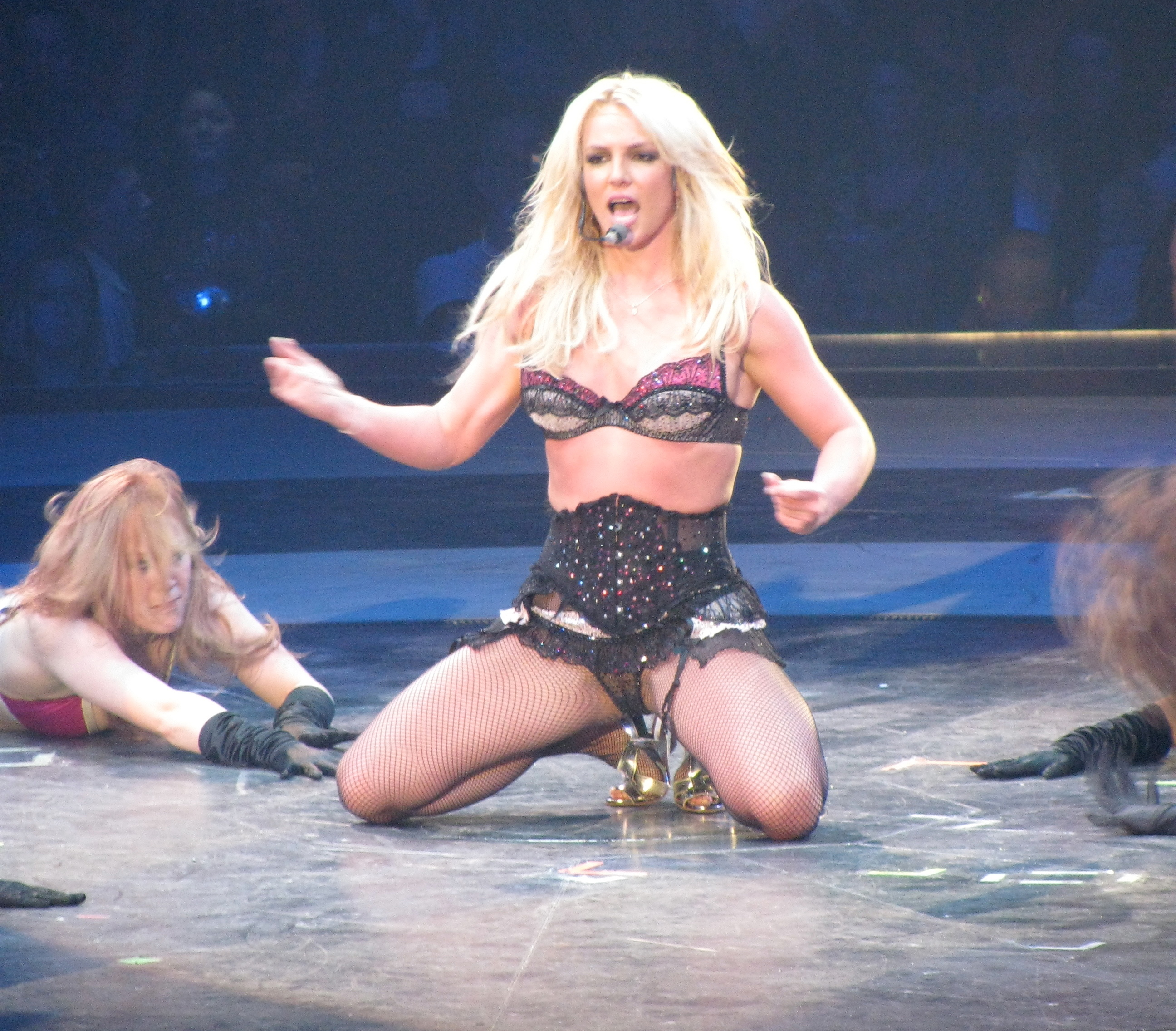
One lyric to "Purge the Poison" references a 2007 media incident where Britney Spears (pictured) was photographed shaving her head.

"Purge the Poison" is a guitar-driven pop, electropop, and power pop anthem. Instrumentation consists of keyboards and synths performed by Decilveo, drums by Sam Kauffman-Skloff, bass by Patrick Kelly, and guitar by David Levita. According to Decilveo, her production on the song is intentionally intense: "I wasn't trying to be nice. I knew it needed to be a sock in the face." Due to the song's use of "theatrical vocal riffs and hard-rocking strings", Joey Nolfi from Entertainment Weekly called it similar, musically, to the material on Marina's debut album, The Family Jewels (2010). The Official Charts Company also referred to "Purge the Poison" as "classic Marina". Marina switches between singing in "theatrical soprano" to "belligerent sass-mouth" during the verses, which Thomas H. Green of The Arts Desk found to be gutsy and trite.

According to Gab Ginsberg from Billboard, "Purge the Poison" is "an Earth Day anthem of sorts", due to its lyrics pertaining to climate change and saving the planet. Marina wrote the song from the point-of-view of Mother Nature, and addresses societal expectations regarding capitalism and patriarchy. As Mother Nature, she opens the song, addressing events such as United States wars, and the consequences of the COVID-19 pandemic: "Virus come, fires burn / Until human beings learn / From every disaster / You are not my master." Other lyrics in the song reference memorable popular culture events, such as Britney Spears shaving her head in 2007, and Harvey Weinstein's role in the Me Too movement.

== Reception ==
Dimitra Gurduiala from Atwood Magazine acclaimed "Purge the Poison", writing that it is the "perfect combination" of her previous musical endeavors; she continued: "If we didn't already know what Marina was able to do, it would be hard to believe that such an iconic and catchy song came out while dealing with serious issues that touch each of us every day." Green also praised it, calling it undoubtedly "one of the year's best pop songs". Ahad Sanwari, for V, called the song a "Guitar Hero dream of a track", and labelled it as one of his favorite new music releases. Red Dziri from The Line of Best Fit highlighted Marina's vocal abilities on the song, writing that she "confront[s] turbulence with ease and get[s] her every word in despite the constant menace of being overthrown by an instrumental neurosis."

On the other hand, Abigail Firth from Dork referred to "Purge the Poison" as the "biggest misstep" of Ancient Dreams in a Modern Land; she called the song "too on the nose" and inferior to its surrounding tracks "Venus Fly Trap" and "Man's World".

=== Chart performance ===
In November 2021, according to the Official Charts Company, "Purge the Poison" peaked at number 14 on the Singles Sales chart, which ranks the best-selling songs of the week. It also reached number 3 on the Physical Singles chart, and was the highest-performing Vinyl Singles entry in its debut week, becoming Marina's first number one effort on the chart.

== Music video ==
The music video for "Purge the Poison" was conceptualised by Marina and Weird Life Films, the video's director. It features Marina wearing an ensemble of colorful and glittery outfits. Charlotte Krol from NME called it a trippy video.

== Track listings and formats ==
- 7" vinyl
1. "Purge the Poison" – 3:17
2. "Purge the Poison" (featuring Pussy Riot) – 3:15
- Digital download/streaming
1. "Purge the Poison" – 3:16
- Digital download/streaming – featuring Pussy Riot
1. "Purge the Poison" (featuring Pussy Riot) – 3:15
- Streaming – Spotify EP edition
1. "Purge the Poison" – 3:17
2. "Man's World" – 3:28

== Credits and personnel ==
=== Song ===
Credits adapted from Tidal.

- Marina Diamandis – vocals, writing
- Jennifer Decilveo – production, additional production, engineering, recording, drum programming, keyboards, synthesizer
- Andrew Lappin – engineering, recording
- Greg Calbi – mastering
- John O'Mahony – mixing
- James Flannigan – vocal production
- Matt Harris – voice editing
- Patrick Kelly – bass
- Sam Kauffman-Skloff – drums
- David Levita – guitar

=== Music video ===
Credits adapted from Marina's YouTube account.

- Weird Life Films – director, concept
- Marina Diamandis – concept
- Erin Boyle – producer
- Anthony Pedone – producer, COVID compliance officer
- Laura Gordon – executive producer
- Jackson James – executive producer, director of photography
- Ryan Ohm – executive producer, edit and color, VFX
- Rick Gorge – VFX
- Trevor Joseph Newton – video commissioner
- Paul Deorio – gaffer
- Michael Suraci – key grip
- Justin Ryan Brown – art direction
- Anthony Nguyen – make up artist
- Rena Calhoun – hair stylist
- Mercedes Natalia – wardrobe stylist
- Oscar Lima – custom wardrobe designer
- Matt Garland – PA

== Charts ==
Chart performance for "Purge the Poison"
Chart (2021)	Peak position
UK Singles Sales (OCC)	14

== Release history ==
Release dates and formats for "Purge the Poison"
Region	Date	Format(s)	Version	Label	Ref.
Various	14 April 2021	Digital download; streaming	Original	Atlantic	
United States	14 April 2021	Streaming (Spotify EP edition)	Original	Atlantic	
Various	5 May 2021	Digital download; streaming	featuring Pussy Riot	Atlantic	
Various	29 October 2021	7" vinyl	Original	Atlantic	

== See also ==
- Climate change in popular culture
