= Man's World (song) =

2020 single by Marina

Single by Marina

from the album Ancient Dreams in a Modern Land
- Released: 18 November 2020
- Genre: Alternative pop
- Length: 3:28
- Label: Atlantic
- Songwriter: Marina Diamandis
- Producers: Jennifer Decilveo; Marina Diamandis

Marina singles chronology
"About Love" (2020)	"Man's World" (2020)	"Purge the Poison" (2021)

Music video
- "Man's World" on YouTube

"Man's World" is a song recorded, written, and produced by Welsh singer-songwriter Marina for her fifth studio album, Ancient Dreams in a Modern Land (2021). The song was also produced by American musician Jennifer Decilveo, who Marina enlisted as part of her effort to work with an all-female production team. It was released as the album's lead single on 18 November 2020 by Atlantic Records. A stripped-down version of the song was made available the next month. Atlantic commissioned two remixes of the song, which were produced by Muna and Empress Of featuring Pabllo Vittar, and released in 2021. "Man's World" is a midtempo alternative pop track with a piano-driven beat and a dreamy sound. Its lyrics criticise history's oppressive treatment of women and minority groups, and Marina states that she no longer wishes to live in a world exclusively led by men.

The song received positive reviews from music critics, and Marina's fulfillment of her promise to work with all-females on the track was commonly discussed. Commercially, "Man's World" entered New Zealand's Hot 40 Singles chart and reached the lower positions of the United Kingdom's downloads and sales component charts, compiled by the Official Charts Company. The accompanying music video for the song was released the same day as the song and directed by Alexandra Gavillet. Filmed in Simi Valley, California, it features the singer performing evocative choreography with a troupe of similarly dressed dancers and was inspired by the works of the neoclassicism movement.

== Background and release ==
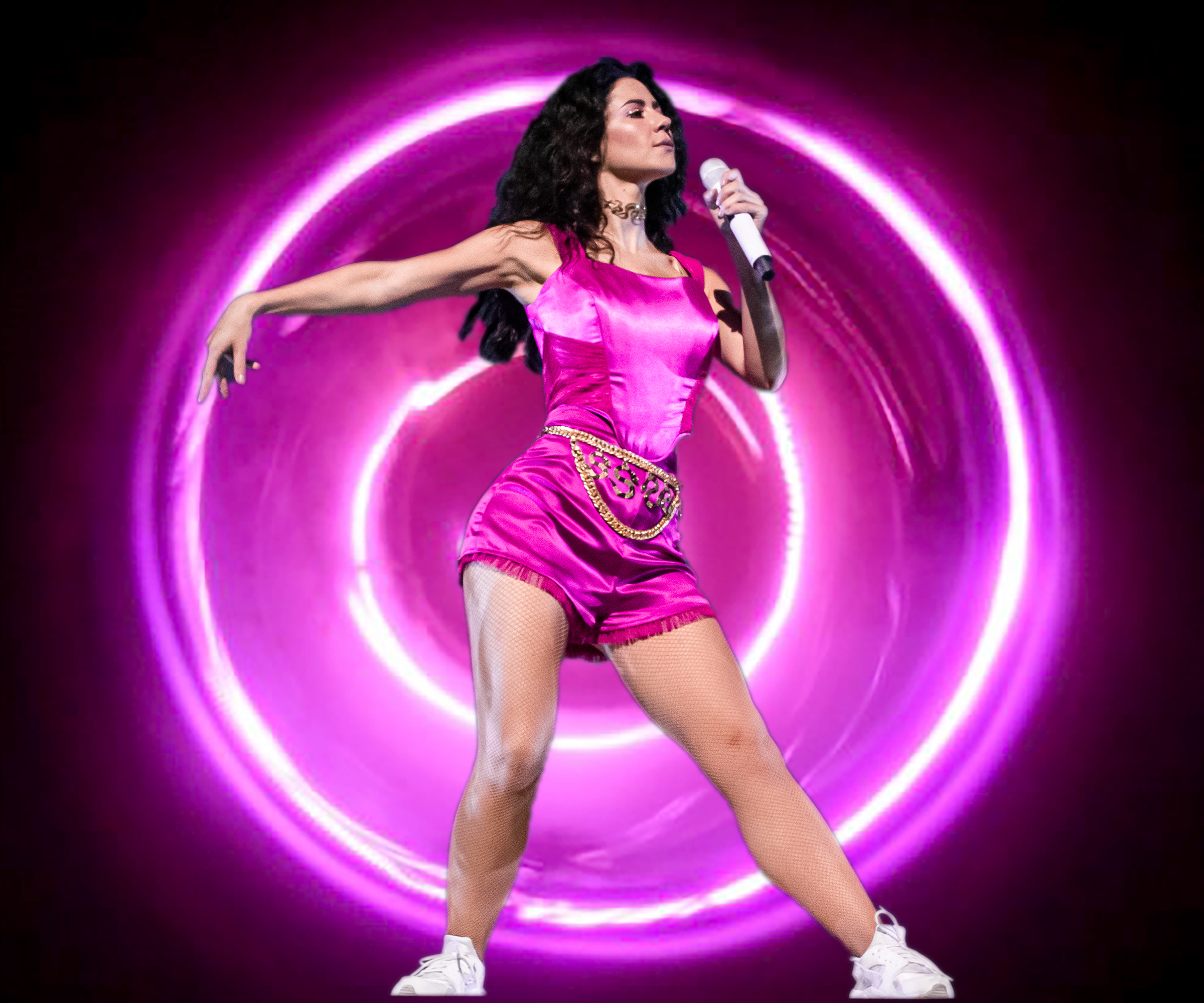
Marina performing during the Love + Fear Tour in October 2019.

In 2019, Marina released Love + Fear, her fourth studio album and first without the "and the Diamonds" part of her former stage name. To promote the project, she embarked on the accompanying Love + Fear Tour later in the year and released her sixth extended play Love + Fear (Acoustic) in September 2019. Following the tour's completion, she began songwriting for a new album; in January 2020, Marina posted to her Instagram account, confirming that she was working on songs, with a photograph that used the caption "Album 5". Another post revealed that she had also been writing lyrics while on holiday in Paris. Later into the year, she released the standalone single "About Love" in February, which was featured on the soundtrack to the American romantic comedy film To All the Boys: P.S. I Still Love You (2020).

Throughout the summer months, Marina teased that she was close to finishing the album and had plans to release new material soon. Former interviews claimed that her next studio album would feature a team of female musicians, in contrast to her experience with Love + Fear in 2019. Behind her intentions, she stated that she was startled to learn "that only two per cent of producers and three per cent of engineers across popular music are women". In September 2020, Marina shared a snippet of a previously unreleased song called "Happy Loner", leaving critics to assume that new music from the singer would arrive shortly. On 13 November 2020, she officially confirmed the release of a new song, titled "Man's World", when she posted the single's cover artwork to her social media accounts. She also posted a photograph of herself containing the lyric "I don't wanna live in a man's world anymore". Mike Wass, a contributor to Idolator, remarked that "Marina has traditionally spent several years on projects" so the announcement of "Man's World" was unexpected.

"Man's World" was produced by American musician Jennifer Decilveo, and written and co-produced by Marina. Marina revealed in an interview with Vogue that the song was intended to be released in April 2020 to coincide with her performance at the Coachella Valley Music and Arts Festival, but the cancellation of the festival due to the COVID-19 pandemic prevented it. Ultimately, it was released for digital download and streaming in various countries on 18 November 2020, through Atlantic Records. That same day, Marina created a pre-order link for a limited edition 7" single on her official merchandise website, limited to 3,000 copies, pressed on pink-coloured vinyl, and containing a previously unreleased B-side. The release was originally scheduled for 12 March 2021, but was delayed until 9 April. On 11 December 2020, a stripped-down version of "Man's World" was released to digital retailers, featuring a black and white variant of the cover artwork. On that same day via Spotify in the US, the "Stripped" version was bundled with the original version of the song as part of a digital extended play to stream. Additionally, Atlantic commissioned several remixes of the song that were first announced in November 2020. The first remix, by American group Muna, was digitally released on 6 January 2021. A second remix, produced by Empress Of and featuring Brazilian drag queen Pabllo Vittar, was released on 4 February 2021.

== Composition and lyrics ==
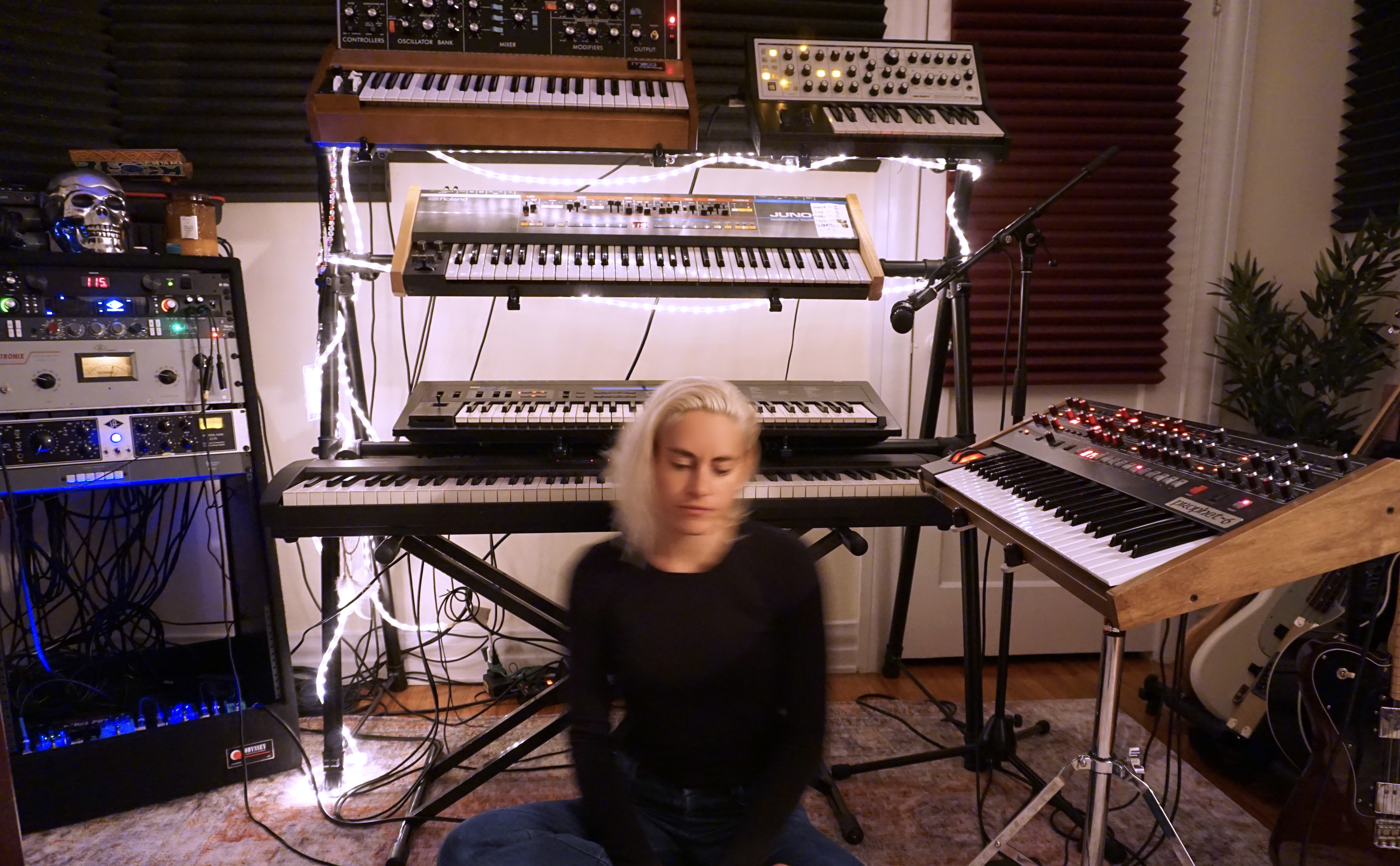
Marina co-produced "Man's World" with American producer Jennifer Decilveo (pictured), as part of a team of all-female musicians.

Musically, "Man's World" is a melodic alternative pop song. Tom Skinner from NME called the song dreamy. Keaton Bell from Vogue described the single as a "soaring pop anthem" that "sounds as big as the topics she's singing about". He also compared it to the song "Savages" from her third studio album, Froot (2015). Marina explained to Bell her inspiration behind the track:

At the time I was mostly inspired by the shifts that are happening for people who are discriminated against. The original idea for the song was to write a snapshot of how women and LGBTQ+ individuals have been subjugated and discriminated against throughout history going back to the Salem witch trials, where any person who was deemed abnormal or slightly alternative was singled out. Those kinds of patterns are still present in society. That’s something inspiring to me and worth writing about.

The song's instrumentation consists of piano, performed by Marina herself, in addition to Patrick Kelly on bass, Sam Kauffman on drums, and David Levita on guitar. Decilveo contributes on keyboards and synthesizer, is credited as the drum programmer, and also provided the background vocals for the track. It was mastered by Emily Lazar and recorded by Cian Riordan and Decilveo.

Lyrically, "Man's World" finds Marina criticising the poor treatment of "women and other minority groups throughout history". In the first verse she sings: "Burnt me at the stake, you thought I was a witch / Centuries ago, now you just call me a bitch". Some lyrics reference former actress Marilyn Monroe or controversial subject matters, such as Hassanal Bolkiah, the current Sultan of Brunei. Marina criticises Bolkiah and name-drops the Beverly Hills Hotel, which he owns, where she references "a sheik who killed thousands of gay men" and concludes "I guess that's why he bought the campest hotel in LA then". Her decision to blast "his use of Sharia law against homosexuals" was considered to be an effort to bring attention to the highly-contested issue, according to a contributor to Contactmusic.com. Derrick Rossignol from Uproxx said that the song's chorus ("Mother Nature's dying, nobody's keeping score / I don't want to live in a man's world anymore") confirms that "Marina put her money where her mouth is", in regards to her decision to work with female musicians on her fifth album.

== Reception ==
Mike Wass from Idolator called the song "biting and very necessary," and described the chorus as catchy. A contributor to DIY labelled the track as an "empowering bop" and noted how Marina stayed true to her word by working with all females. A staff member from Paper liked the song, explaining that they were grateful for Marina "getting busy" and remaining productive despite the circumstances of the COVID-19 pandemic. In their review of the song's music video, a contributor to Contactmusic.com wrote that the song "highlights what a sensational, individual and captivating voice Marina possess[es]; her vocal delivery here is sensational." Dork's Abigail Firth also discussed Marina's vocals, calling them delightful. In his review of the parent album, Thomas H. Green from The Arts Desk acclaimed both "Man's World" and the title track for their chutzpah. Jem Aawad from Variety featured it in the magazine's "Best Songs of the Week" column during the third week of November 2020.

=== Chart performance ===
"Man's World" entered the record charts in two countries. In the United Kingdom, the song did not reach the Official Charts Company's UK Singles Chart, which ranks the country's top 100 most popular songs weekly. However, it did chart on the download component chart during the week of 20 November 2020. It debuted at number 96, the same week that it appeared on the sales component chart at number 99. The latter position later improved to number 29, during the week of 24 June 2021. It also reached the charts in New Zealand, compiled by Recorded Music NZ, where it debuted on the Hot 40 Singles chart at number 36 during the week of 30 November.

== Music video ==
The accompanying music video for "Man's World" was first announced on 16 November 2020 when she uploaded a 15-second teaser of the clip to her social media accounts. It premiered on her YouTube account at approximately 9:30 AM (PST) on 18 November 2020, exactly when the single itself was released. According to Marina, the visual was inspired by the neoclassicism movement of the nineteenth century, particularly the paintings of English artist John William Godward. It was filmed on-location in Simi Valley in California and directed by Alexandra Gavillet.

Alongside the YouTube release of the music video, it was made available for download via Apple Music on the same day, 18 November 2020.

== Track listings and formats ==
- 7" vinyl
1. "Man's World" – 3:28
2. "Man's World" (Muna remix) – 2:59
- Digital download/promotional CD single/streaming
1. "Man's World" – 3:28
- Digital download/streaming – Empress Of remix
1. "Man's World" (Empress Of remix featuring Pabllo Vittar) – 3:10
- Digital download/streaming – Muna remix
1. "Man's World" (Muna remix) – 2:59
- Digital download/streaming – stripped
1. "Man's World" (stripped) – 3:38
- Streaming – Empress Of remix (Spotify EP edition)
1. "Man's World" (Empress Of remix featuring Pabllo Vittar) – 3:11
2. "Man's World" (Muna remix) – 2:59
3. "Man's World" – 3:28
4. "Man's World" (stripped) – 3:38
- Streaming – Muna remix (Spotify EP edition)
1. "Man's World" (Muna remix) – 2:59
2. "Man's World" – 3:28
3. "Man's World" (stripped) – 3:38
- Streaming – stripped (Spotify EP edition)
1. "Man's World" (stripped) – 3:38
2. "Man's World" – 3:28

== Credits and personnel ==
=== Song ===
Credits adapted from Tidal.

- Marina Diamandis – vocals, writer, producer, piano
- Jennifer Decilveo – producer, background vocals, drum programming, recording, keyboards, synthesizer
- Jacob Johnston – assistant engineer
- Nick Brumme – assistant engineer
- Emily Lazar – mastering
- Dan Gretch – mixing
- Cian Riordan – recording
- Patrick Kelly – bass
- Sam Kauffman – drums
- David Levita – guitar

=== Music video ===
Credits adapted from Marina's Instagram and YouTube accounts.

- Alexandra Gavillet – director
- Marina Diamandis – writer, creative direction, story
- Briana Gonzales – producer
- Fiorella Occhipinti – cinematographer
- Anaka – editor
- Mercedes Natalia – stylist
- Olima – costume designer
- Kate Lingan – makeup artist
- Rena Calhoun – hair stylist
- Mini Moroni – movement director
- Cathy Cooper – cast member
- Joe Davis – cast member
- Reshma Gajjar – cast member
- Sabrina Johnson – cast member
- Maria Maea – cast member
- Gabriela Ruiz – cast member

== Charts ==
Chart performance for "Man's World"
Chart (2020–2021)	Peak position
New Zealand Hot Singles (RMNZ)	36
UK Singles Downloads (OCC)	96
UK Singles Sales (OCC)	29

== Release history ==
Release dates and formats for "Man's World"
Region	Date	Format(s)	Version	Label	Ref.
Various	18 November 2020	Digital download; streaming	Original	Atlantic	
Various	11 December 2020	Digital download; streaming	Stripped	Atlantic	
United States	11 December 2020	Streaming (Spotify EP edition)	Stripped	Atlantic	
Benelux	2020	Promotional CD single	Original	Atlantic	
Various	6 January 2021	Digital download; streaming	Muna remix	Atlantic	
United States	6 January 2021	Streaming (Spotify EP edition)	Muna remix	Atlantic	
Various	4 February 2021	Digital download; streaming	Empress Of remix	Atlantic	
United States	4 February 2021	Streaming (Spotify EP edition)	Empress Of remix	Atlantic	
Various	9 April 2021	7"	Original	Atlantic	
