= Ancient Dreams in a Modern Land (song) =

2021 single by Marina

Single by Marina

from the album Ancient Dreams in a Modern Land
- Released: 19 May 2021
- Genre: Pop rock; disco; electropop
- Length: 3:26
- Label: Atlantic
- Songwriter: Marina Diamandis
- Producers: Marina Diamandis; James Flannigan

Marina singles chronology
"Purge the Poison" (2021)	"Ancient Dreams in a Modern Land" (2021)	"Venus Fly Trap" (2021)

Music video
- "Ancient Dreams in a Modern Land" on YouTube

"Ancient Dreams in a Modern Land" is a song written and recorded by Welsh singer-songwriter Marina for her fifth studio album of the same name (2021). It was released as the album's third single on 19 May 2021, through Atlantic Records, premiering alongside the announcement of a livestreaming concert titled Ancient Dreams: Live from the Desert. The song is a pop rock, disco, and electropop track with a glam rock type beat, and was produced by Marina and James Flannigan. Critics called it reminiscent of Britney Spears' 2008 single "Womanizer". An accompanying VHS-inspired music video debuted the day of the song's release.

== Background and release ==
In January 2020, Marina announced that she had begun work on her fifth studio album, the follow-up to Love + Fear (2019). The first single for the project, "Man's World", was released in November following a lengthy delay due to the COVID-19 pandemic. She followed with second single "Purge the Poison" in April 2021, and revealed the title of the album, Ancient Dreams in a Modern Land, and its track listing. Additionally, she announced that she would release two more singles, in support of the album, within a month. "Ancient Dreams in a Modern Land" serves as the album's third single. James Flannigan produced the song with Marina, who is credited as the sole songwriter.

Marina first teased a snippet of the title track on 11 May 2021 via her Twitter account. It was officially released on 19 May 2021 for digital download and streaming, through Atlantic Records. On that same day in the US, the song was bundled with previous singles "Man's World" and "Purge the Poison"" as part of a digital extended play on Spotify. The song's premiere coincided with the announcement of a livestreaming concert, Ancient Dreams: Live from the Desert, scheduled to be broadcast on 12–13 June 2021.

== Composition and lyrics ==
"Ancient Dreams in a Modern Land" is a pop rock, disco, and electropop song with a glam rock style beat. It is backed by drums and a "cinematic guitar riff". Danielle Chelosky from Stereogum opined that the song has the same energy of Britney Spears' "Womanizer" (2008) and previous single, "Purge the Poison". She also referred to it as Marina's possible return to the "idiosyncratic, internet-influenced anthems that populated Tumblr for years". Similarly, Vicky Greer from Gigwise described the song's sound as Marina's return "to the intoxicating dance-pop of the late '00s, with a much more modern message." The Arts Desk's Thomas H. Green described it as "an electro-glam-pop stomper" that is, musically, reminiscent of both "Womanizer" and Goldfrapp's 2003 single "Strict Machine".

According to Tristan Kinnett from Mxdwn, the song's lyrics find Marina envisioning "the possibility of leaving her Earthly form behind her". She sings the refrain ("I am not my body, not my mind or my brain / Not my thoughts or feelings, I am not my DNA") in a high-pitched vibrato.

== Critical reception ==
Chelosky provided a positive review of "Ancient Dreams in a Modern Land", predicting that it will mark Marina's return "to possessing an interesting image that imbues the music with personality". Abigail Firth, of Dork, called the song "one of her most unabashedly fun and vibrant" releases, and felt it recalled the sound of her debut album, The Family Jewels (2010). A contributor to Contactmusic.com called the song equally as strong as both "Man's World" and "Purge the Poison".

== Music video ==
The music video to "Ancient Dreams in a Modern Land", referred to as the song's "visual", was released on 19 May 2021. Damian Jones from NME called the video "VHS-inspired", while the Contactmusic.com contributor described it as "retro, semi-psychedelic, Barbarella meets Bond".

== Track listings ==
Digital download/streaming
No.	Title	Length
1.	"Ancient Dreams in a Modern Land"	3:26

Streaming – Spotify EP edition
No.	Title	Length
1.	"Ancient Dreams in a Modern Land"	3:26
2.	"Purge the Poison"	3:16
3.	"Man's World"	3:28

== Release history ==
Release dates and formats for "Ancient Dreams in a Modern Land"
Region	Date	Format(s)	Label	Ref.
Various	19 May 2021	Digital download; streaming	Atlantic	
United States	19 May 2021	Streaming (Spotify EP edition)	Atlantic	
