= Today Was a Good Day =

Studio album by Lucy Spraggan
- Released: 3 May 2019
- Genre: Pop
- Label: Cooking Vinyl
- Producer: Jon Maguire

Lucy Spraggan chronology
I Hope You Don't Mind Me Writing (2017)	Today Was a Good Day (2019)	Choices (2021)

Singles from Today Was a Good Day
- 1. "Stick the Kettle On" Released: 7 September 2018; 2. "Lucky Stars" Released: 2019

Today Was a Good Day is the fifth studio album by the English singer-songwriter Lucy Spraggan, released on 3 May 2019 by Cooking Vinyl. It debuted and peaked at No. 12 on the UK Albums Chart.

== Track listing ==
No.	Title	Writer(s)	Producer(s)	Length
1.	"Breathe"	Lucy Spraggan; David Dunwell; Joseph Dunwell	Jon Maguire	3:16
2.	"Lucky Stars"	Spraggan; Edd Holloway	Maguire	3:22
3.	"End of the World"	Spraggan; Joseph Hamill	Maguire	3:12
4.	"Don't Play This on the Radio"	Spraggan; Jon Maguire	Maguire	3:13
5.	"Dinner's Ready"	Lucy Spraggan; David Dunwell; Joseph Dunwell	Maguire	3:02
6.	"Lightning"	Spraggan; Joseph Hamill	Spraggan; Maguire	3:09
7.	"Home Wasn't Built in a Day"	Spraggan; Joseph Hamill	Maguire	3:42
8.	"Stick the Kettle On" (featuring Scouting for Girls)	Spraggan; Maguire; Roy Stride	Maguire	2:55
9.	"Today Was a Good Day"	Spraggan; Joseph Hamill	Maguire	3:03
10.	"Connie's Bar"	Spraggan	Maguire	2.35
11.	"Love Is the Best Revenge"	Spraggan; Sam Preston; Timothy Deal	Maguire	3.34
12.	"The Waiting Room"	Spraggan; Hamill	Maguire	3:58
13.	"As the Saying Goes"	Spraggan; Hamill	Jon Maguire; Charlie Martin	3:42
14.	"Thanks for Choosing Me"	Spraggan; Hamill	Jon Maguire; Charlie Martin	3:14

== Charts ==
Chart (2019)	Peak position
Scottish Albums (Official Charts)	3
UK Albums (Official Charts)	12
