= Tea and Toast =

Single by Lucy Spraggan

from the album Join the Club
- Released: 13 July 2012; 13 December 2013 (re-release)
- Recorded: 2011
- Genre: Indie pop
- Length: 4:36
- Label: Independent; Columbia
- Songwriter: Lucy Spraggan

Lucy Spraggan singles chronology
"Tea and Toast" (2012)	"Lighthouse" (2013)
"Last Night (Beer Fear)" (2013)	"Tea & Toast" (2013)	"Give Me Sunshine" (2014)

2013 cover

"Tea and Toast" is the debut single by the English singer-songwriter Lucy Spraggan. The song was released in the United Kingdom as a digital download on 13 July 2012, and the following year on 13 December 2013, Columbia Records re-released the song. It is included on her studio album Join the Club (2013).

== Live performances ==
She sang the song on The X Factor at bootcamp after Tulisa said that she wanted to hear one of her tracks. Spraggan said that the song was about a real couple that she had seen. After she performed the song, she burst into tears when she received a standing ovation from the audience and the judging panel.

== Inspiration for song ==
Spraggan explains the inspiration behind "Tea and Toast". She revealed that she was inspired by an elderly couple walking down the street when "the lady collapsed in the street and was unconscious. And the look on the husbands face was like he'd never lost her before and he'd just lost her then. It was horrible and it inspired me to write a song — after I got them into an ambulance."

== Track listing ==
Digital download
No.	Title	Length
1.	"Tea and Toast"	4:36

Album version
No.	Title	Length
1.	"Tea & Toast"	4:32

Digital download – 2013 single
No.	Title	Length
1.	"Tea and Toast"	4:32
2.	"It Doesn't Feel Like Christmas"	3:30

== Big Hits 2012 cover version ==
After Spraggan was asked to remove her album Top Room at the Zoo (2011) from iTunes, a group called Big Hits 2012 took advantage and released their own version. This version charted at No. 52 on the UK Singles Chart, while their version of "Last Night" also charted, at No. 74.

== Chart performance ==
The song entered the UK Singles Chart at number 135 and number 11 on the UK Indie Chart after she performed her song "Last Night" at X Factor auditions which was shown on 25 August 2012. In October 2013, the song re-entered the UK Singles Chart at number 50, due to the release of her album Join the Club.

=== Weekly charts ===
Chart (2012)	Peak position
UK Singles (Official Charts Company)	135
UK Indie (Official Charts)	11
Chart (2013)	Peak position
UK Singles (Official Charts Company)	50

== Release history ==
Region	Date	Format	Label
United Kingdom	13 July 2012	Digital download	Independent
United Kingdom	13 December 2013	Digital download	Columbia Records
