= Gatlin =

Gatlin may refer to:

== People with the surname ==
- Alfred Moore Gatlin (1790–1841), American Representative from North Carolina
- Helen Camille Stanley Hartmeyer Gatlin (born 1930), composer and violist
- Justin Gatlin (born 1982), American sprinter
- LaDonna Gatlin (born 1954), American musician
- Larry Gatlin (born 1948), American country music singer
- Richard C. Gatlin (1809–1896), Confederate Army Brigadier General

== Places ==
- Gatlin Site, archaeological site in Arizona
- Gatlin Glacier, Antarctica
- Gatlin Peak, Antarctica

== See also ==
- Gatlin Brothers-Southwest Golf Classic, a former professional golf event in Abilene, Texas (played under this name from 1981 to 1988)
- The Champions Classic, formerly named Gatlin Brothers Seniors Golf Classic. A former professional golf event (1983 to 1985)
- Gatlin, Nebraska, a fictional town in the short story "Children of the Corn" by Stephen King
- Gatlin, South Carolina, a fictional town in the novel Beautiful Creatures by Kami Garcia and Margaret Stohl
- Gatling gun, early hand-cranked weapon
