= Balance (Lucy Spraggan album) =

Studio album by Lucy Spraggan
- Released: 11 August 2023
- Genre: Pop
- Length: 44:52
- Label: CTRL
- Producer: Aron Bicskey; Philip Magee; Frank Colucci; Sam Preston

Lucy Spraggan chronology
Choices (2021)	Balance (2023)

Singles from Balance
- 1. "Everything Changes (Beer Fear, Pt. II)" Released: 26 August 2022; 2. "Balance" Released: 7 December 2022; 3. "OCD" Released: 3 March 2023; 4. "Bodies" Released: 19 April 2023; 5. "Empire" Released: 14 June 2023

Balance is the seventh studio album by the English singer-songwriter Lucy Spraggan. The album was released on 11 August 2023 through her own label, CTRL Records.

== Track listing ==
Balance track listing
No.	Title	Writer(s)	Producer(s)	Length
1.	"Everything Changes (Beer Fear, Pt. II)"	Lucy Spraggan; Sam Preston	Philip Magee; Frank Colucci	2:58
2.	"OCD"	Spraggan; Aron Bicskey	Bicskey; Magee	3:28
3.	"Balance"	Spraggan; Bicskey	Magee	3:34
4.	"Bodies"	Spraggan; Joe Hammill	Magee	3:04
5.	"Seasick"	Joe Dunwell; Dave Dunwell	Magee	3:02
6.	"Not Another Travelling Song"	Spraggan; Cian McSweeney; Magee; Stephen Garrigan	Magee	3:25
7.	"California"	Spraggan; Hammill	Magee	3:14
8.	"Cocaine"	Spraggan; Joe Dunwell; Dave Dunwell	Magee	3:07
9.	"Hope For the Best"	Spraggan	Bicskey; Magee	2:48
10.	"Caroline"	Spraggan; Hammill	Bicskey; Magee	3:44
11.	"Underdog"	Spraggan; Joe Dunwell; Dave Dunwell	Magee	3:26
12.	"Empire"	Spraggan; Joe Dunwell; Dave Dunwell	Magee	3:05
13.	"Manchester"	Spraggan; Preston	Magee	2:48
14.	"Cost of Living"	Spraggan; Preston	Magee; Preston	3:09
Total length:				44:52

== Charts ==
Chart performance for Balance
Chart (2023)	Peak position
Scottish Albums (OCC)	8
UK Albums (OCC)	24
UK Independent Albums (OCC)	3

== Release history ==
Release dates and formats for Balance
Region	Date	Format(s)	Label	Ref.
Various	11 August 2023	CD; digital download; LP; streaming	Ctrl Records	
