= Lighthouse (Lucy Spraggan song) =

Single by Lucy Spraggan

from the album Join the Club
- Released: 14 July 2013
- Recorded: 2012
- Genre: Pop
- Length: 3:20
- Label: Columbia
- Songwriters: Lucy Spraggan; Samuel Preston; James Flannigan

Lucy Spraggan singles chronology
"Tea and Toast" (2012)	"Lighthouse" (2013)	"Last Night (Beer Fear)" (2013)

Music video
- "Lighthouse" on YouTube

"Lighthouse" is a single by the English singer-songwriter Lucy Spraggan. The song was released in the United Kingdom as a digital download on 28 June 2013 as the lead single from her debut studio album. The song was written by Lucy Spraggan, James Flannigan and the Ordinary Boys frontman Preston. The song has peaked to number 26 on the UK singles chart.

== Background ==
The song was inspired by a journey Spraggan made across America at the age of 18 with just her guitar and a three-month Visa, Spraggan said, "Lighthouses are my good omen. When I was in the US and stuff went wrong, when I'd miss the last bus or I'd run out of money, I'd always see a lighthouse on a piece of paper, beer bottle or in real life then things would start getting better."

== Live performances ==
On 15 July 2013, Spraggan performed the song live on BBC Breakfast.

== Music video ==
A music video to accompany the release of "Lighthouse" was first released onto YouTube on 22 May 2013 at a total length of three minutes and twenty-two seconds.

== Track listing ==
Digital download
No.	Title	Length
1.	"Lighthouse"	3:20
2.	"Butterflies"	3:15
3.	"'91" (Acoustic)	3:15
4.	"Lighthouse" (Music video)	3:21

== Chart performance ==
=== Weekly charts ===
Chart (2013)	Peak position
Ireland (IRMA)	21
Scotland Singles (Official Charts)	14
UK Singles (Official Charts)	26

== Release history ==
Region	Date	Format	Label
United Kingdom	14 July 2013	Digital download	Columbia Records
