= Join the Club (album) =

Studio album by Lucy Spraggan
- Released: 4 October 2013
- Recorded: 2011–12
- Genre: Pop
- Length: 43:07
- Label: Columbia

Lucy Spraggan chronology
Top Room at the Zoo (2011)	Join the Club (2013)	We Are (2015)

Singles from Join the Club
- 1. "Tea & Toast" Released: 13 July 2012; 2. "Lighthouse" Released: 28 June 2013; 3. "Last Night (Beer Fear)" Released: 29 September 2013

Join the Club is the second and major-label debut studio album by English singer-songwriter Lucy Spraggan. It was released on 4 October 2013. The album includes the singles "Lighthouse" and "Last Night (Beer Fear)". The album peaked at number 7 on the UK Albums Chart and number 6 on the Scottish Albums Chart. It was certified silver by the BPI on 12 October 2018.

== Singles ==
"Lighthouse" was released as the album's lead single on 28 June 2013. The song reached number 26 on the UK Singles Chart.

"Last Night (Beer Fear)" was released on 29 September 2013, as the album's second single. The original version was featured on Spraggan's debut album, Top Room at the Zoo and was her audition song for The X Factor in 2012. A new version had been recorded for this album. The music video for this song was released on Spraggan's Vevo on 16 September 2013 and is a remake of the first video for this song.

On her October 2013 Join the Club tour, Spraggan announced each night prior to performing "Tea & Toast" that she was proud to announce that "Tea & Toast" would be her third official album single. Spraggan confirmed via her Twitter page that she had been recording an accompanying music video for the track. The single was released on 13 December 2013.

=== Other songs ===
"Tea & Toast" was released independently as a single on 13 July 2012. Spraggan performed the song in the boot camp stage of The X Factor after Tulisa asked to hear another one of her original songs. The song reached number 135 in the UK.

"Mountains" was made available to download from the album on iTunes when it was made available to pre-order. A music video for the track was also released on 21 August 2013. Spraggan performed the song on the first live show of The X Factor in 2012.

"Someone" was iTunes' 'single of the week' and was available to download for free on the same week as the album's release.

== Track listing ==
No.	Title	Writer(s)	Producer(s)	Length
1.	"Someone"	Lucy Spraggan	James Flannigan; Samuel Preston	2:53
2.	"Tea & Toast"	Spraggan	Flannigan; Preston	4:32
3.	"Lighthouse"	Spraggan; Samuel Preston; Flannigan	Flannigan; Preston	3:21
4.	"'91"	Spraggan	Flannigan; Preston	3:15
5.	"The Tourist"	Spraggan	Flannigan; Preston	3:20
6.	"In a State"	Spraggan	Flannigan; Preston	2:50
7.	"Wait for Me"	Spraggan; Preston; Flannigan	Flannigan; Preston	3:18
8.	"Mountains"	Spraggan	David Kosten	3:38
9.	"Let Go"	Spraggan	Flannigan; Preston	4:15
10.	"Last Night (Beer Fear)"	Spraggan	Flannigan; Preston	2:13
11.	"Join the Club"	Spraggan	Flannigan; Preston	2:09
12.	"You're Too Young"	Spraggan	Flannigan; Preston	4:13
13.	"Paper Dreams"	Spraggan, Chris Byard	David Kosten	3:12
Total length:				43:07

Deluxe edition bonus tracks
No.	Title	Writer(s)	Producer(s)	Length
14.	"Rockliffe Bay"	Spraggan	Flannigan; Preston	2:56
15.	"If I Had the Money"	Spraggan	Flannigan; Preston	3:03
16.	"Butterflies"	Spraggan	Flannigan; Preston	3:18
17.	"Safe"	Spraggan	Flannigan; Preston	3:23
Total length:				55:47

- All credits are taken from the album's liner notes.

== Chart performance ==
Chart (2013)	Peak position
Irish Albums (IRMA)	14
Scottish Albums (Official Charts)	6
UK Albums (Official Charts)	7
UK Album Downloads (Official Charts)	3

== Release history ==
Region	Date	Format	Label	Edition
Ireland	4 October 2013	Digital download; CD	Columbia Records	Standard; Deluxe
United Kingdom	7 October 2013	Digital download; CD	Columbia Records	Standard; Deluxe
