= We Are (Lucy Spraggan album) =

Studio album by Lucy Spraggan
- Released: 4 May 2015
- Recorded: 2014
- Genre: Pop
- Length: 38:25
- Label: CTRL Records
- Producer: Adam Argyle; Martin Brammer; Jordan Riley; Jon Maguire; Steve Power; The Nexus; One Bit Productions; Gordon Mills Jr.; Stuart Roslyn; Ben Noke

Lucy Spraggan chronology
Join the Club (2013)	We Are (2015)	Home (2016)

Singles from We Are
- 1. "Unsinkable" Released: 12 April 2015

We Are is the third studio album by English singer-songwriter Lucy Spraggan. It was released on 4 May 2015 independently through Spraggan's label, CTRL Records. The album peaked at number 17 on the UK Albums Chart.

== Singles ==
"Unsinkable" was released independently as the album's first single on 12 April 2015.

== Track listing ==
No.	Title	Writer(s)	Producer(s)	Length
1.	"23"	Lucy Spraggan; Martin Brammer; Adam Argyle	Adam Argyle; Martin Brammer; Jordan Riley	3:07
2.	"London Bound"	Spraggan; Jon Maguire; Caroline Ailin	Jon Maguire	2:54
3.	"Unsinkable"	Spraggan; Brammer; Argyle	Steve Power	3:28
4.	"In This Church"	Spraggan; David Sneddon; James Bauer-Mein	The Nexus	2:49
5.	"The Postman"	Spraggan	Power	3:42
6.	"I Don't Know"	Spraggan; Joe Murphy; Jonty Howard	One Bit Productions	2:59
7.	"Broken Bones"	Spraggan; Gordon Mills Jr.	Gordon Mills Jr.	3:21
8.	"IOU"	Spraggan; George O'Dowd; John Themis	Power	2:33
9.	"Coming Down"	Spraggan; Sneddon; Bauer-Mein	The Nexus	2:54
10.	"Until I've Lived My Life"	Spraggan; Ben Noke	Power	3:17
11.	"Uninspired"	Spraggan; Noke	Stuart Roslyn	3:33
12.	"Papercuts" (Original Demo)	Spraggan; Noke	Ben Noke	3:48
Total length:				38:25

== Chart performance ==
Chart (2015)	Peak position
Scottish Albums (Official Charts)	20
UK Albums (Official Charts)	17
UK Album Downloads (Official Charts)	27
UK Independent Albums (Official Charts)	4

== Release history ==
Region	Date	Format	Label	Ref.
United Kingdom	4 May 2015	Digital download; CD	CTRL Records	
