= I Hope You Don't Mind Me Writing =

Studio album by Lucy Spraggan
- Released: 27 January 2017
- Genre: Pop
- Label: CTRL Records
- Producer: Jon Maguire; Lucy Spraggan; Gordon Mills

Lucy Spraggan chronology
Home (2016)	I Hope You Don't Mind Me Writing (2017)	Today Was a Good Day (2019)

Singles from I Hope You Don't Mind Me Writing
- 1. "Dear You" Released: 12 August 2016; 2. "Modern Day Frankenstein" Released: 9 December 2016

I Hope You Don't Mind Me Writing is the fourth studio album by English singer-songwriter Lucy Spraggan, released on 27 January 2017. The album includes the singles "Dear You" and "Modern Day Frankenstein".

== Track listing ==
I Hope You Don't Mind Me Writing
No.	Title	Writer(s)	Producer(s)	Length
1.	"Fight for It"	Lucy Spraggan; Ben Noke	Jon Maguire	3:38
2.	"Loaded Gun"	Spraggan; Jon Maguire	Maguire	2:40
3.	"Grown Up"	Spraggan; Noke	Maguire	3:33
4.	"I Don't Live There Anymore"	Spraggan; Joe Hammill	Maguire	3:33
5.	"Dear You"	Spraggan	Maguire	3:29
6.	"Freddos Aren't 10p"	Spraggan	Spraggan; Maguire	1:58
7.	"Hey William" (featuring The Dunwells)	Spraggan; David Dunwell; Joseph Dunwell	Maguire	3:10
8.	"If"	Spraggan; Samuel Preston; James Flannigan	Maguire	2:52
9.	"All That I've Loved (For Barbara)"	Spraggan; Noke	Maguire	3:41
10.	"Puppy Dog Eyes"	Spraggan	Maguire	3:22
11.	"Modern Day Frankenstein"	Spraggan; Hammill	Maguire	3:35
12.	"Prozac"	Spraggan; Gordon Mills	Maguire; Gordon Mills	3:37
13.	"Hush Little Baby"	Spraggan	Maguire	3:02

== Charts ==
Chart (2017)	Peak position
Scottish Albums (Official Charts)	6
UK Albums (Official Charts)	12
UK Independent Albums (Official Charts)	2
