= Last Night (Lucy Spraggan song) =

Single by Lucy Spraggan

from the album Top Room at the Zoo and Join the Club
- Released: 29 September 2013
- Recorded: 2013
- Genre: Pop; acoustic; comedy
- Length: 2:13
- Label: Sony Music Entertainment
- Songwriter: Lucy Spraggan
- Producers: Will Farley (Top Room at the Zoo version); James Falnnigan; Samuel Preston (Join the Club version)

Lucy Spraggan singles chronology
"Lighthouse" (2013)	"Last Night" (2013)	"Tea & Toast" (2013)

Music video
- "Last Night" on YouTube

"Last Night" is a song by the English singer-songwriter Lucy Spraggan, from her self-released album Top Room at the Zoo (2011). The song entered the UK Singles Chart at number 70 after performing the song at The X Factor auditions which was shown on 25 August 2012. Following a rule change regarding X Factor contestants, it was pulled from iTunes but early sales enabled it to finish at number 11 for the week. A new version of the song "Last Night (Beer Fear)" was released in the United Kingdom on 29 September 2013 as the second single from her debut studio album Join the Club (2013)

== Background ==
Spraggan performed the song at The X Factor auditions; she was put through to bootcamp after performing the track. Judge Louis Walsh suggested that the song could go to number one in the charts. Shortly after the audition was screened, the song entered the UK Singles Chart at number 70. The song then peaked to number 2 on iTunes. However, it was soon removed from iTunes by request of The X Factor producers due to an X Factor rule change. She was told to take down her album and informed that all other X Factor contestants this year have also been banned until the show is over, in order to give them the same level of exposure. Steve Anderson of The Independent suggested that it was removed because it was challenging the 2011 X Factor victors, Little Mix, for the number one spot.

== Chart performance ==
On 26 August 2012 "Last Night" entered the UK Singles Chart at number 70 after Spraggan performed the song at The X Factor auditions, which was shown in the episode broadcast on 25 August 2012. On 29 August 2012, "Last Night" was at number 5 on the Official Chart Update before being removed from iTunes later that day. It finished in the week end charts in the UK at number 11. On 30 August 2012, the song entered the Irish Singles Chart at number 16.

== Music video ==
A music video for the song was uploaded to YouTube on 24 August 2012 at a total length of two minutes and fourteen seconds. The video was directed by Damien Reeves and produced by Melmo Films and funded by Live and Unsigned as one part of Lucy's prize for becoming the runner up of Live and Unsigned 2011.

== Track listing ==
Digital download (2011)
No.	Title	Writer(s)	Producer(s)	Length
1.	"Last Night"	Lucy Spraggan	Will Farley	2:09

Digital download (2013)
No.	Title	Writer(s)	Producer(s)	Length
1.	"Last Night (Beer Fear)"	Spraggan	James Falnnigan; Samuel Preston	2:13

=== Last Night ===
Chart (2012)	Peak position
Ireland (IRMA)	16
Scottish Singles Sales (Official Charts)	11
UK Singles (Official Charts)	11
UK Indie (Official Charts)	2

=== Last Night (Beer Fear) ===
Chart (2013)	Peak position
Ireland (IRMA)	45
Scottish Singles Sales (Official Charts)	15
UK Singles (Official Charts)	18

== Release history ==
Country	Release date	Format	Label
United Kingdom	29 September 2013	Digital download	Sony Music Entertainment
