= Lucy Spraggan =

English singer-songwriter (born 1991)

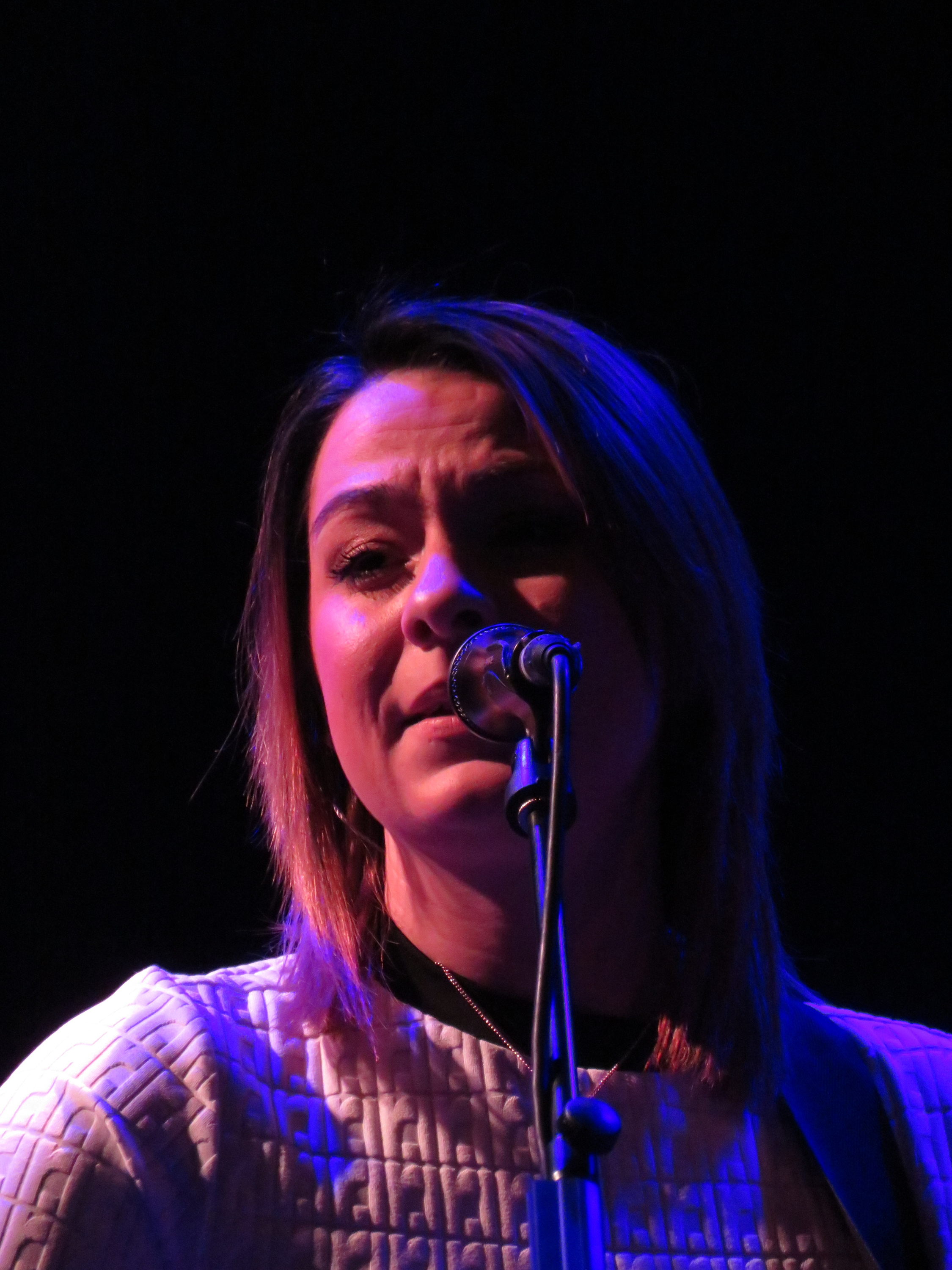

Background information
- Born: Lucy Honour Ruby Spraggan; 21 July 1991 (age 35); Canterbury, Kent, England
- Origin: Buxton, England
- Genres: Folk pop; indie pop; acoustic
- Occupation: Singer-songwriter
- Instruments: Vocals; guitar
- Works: Discography
- Years active: 2011–present
- Labels: CTRL; Columbia; Cooking Vinyl
- Spouse(s): Georgina Gordon (m. 2016; sep. 2019) Emilia Smith (m. 2024)
- Website: lucyspraggan.com

Lucy Honour Ruby Spraggan (born 21 July 1991) is an English singer-songwriter. Spraggan was a contestant on The X Factor in 2012, and she was the first contestant in the show's history to score a Top 40 single and album before the live shows aired, with her independently released album Top Room at the Zoo (2011). Following the show Spraggan signed a recording contract with Columbia Records, and she has released seven studio albums in total.

Spraggan auditioned for The X Factor in 2012, performing her composition "Last Night". Spraggan quit her run on The X Factor three weeks into the live shows, finishing in ninth place. It was initially stated that she had left due to illness, however Spraggan later revealed in her biography, Process, that her departure was a consequence of her being raped by a porter in a hotel. Her debut major-label album, Join the Club, was released on 7 October 2013, reaching No. 7 on the UK Albums Chart. She has since released five more studio albums. Her sixth album, Choices, was released on 26 February 2021 and debuted at No. 5 on the UK Albums Chart. The album was preceded by the singles "Flowers", "Roots" and "Sober". Subsequently, Spraggan's seventh studio album, Balance, was released in August 2023. Her autobiography, Process, was released on 20 July 2023.

== Career ==
=== 2011–2012: Live and Unsigned and The X Factor ===
In July 2011, Spraggan was announced as the runner up of the Urban, Pop & Acoustic Category of Live and Unsigned, placing third place overall in the competition. Spraggan's prizes awarded by Live and Unsigned for her progress in the competition consisted of a festival slot at Osfest, and a slot at Australia's 'Go Connect' Festival. When the festival was later cancelled, Live and Unsigned provided Spraggan with a series of replacement prizes, including: a string of guest act spots at Live and Unsigned and Open Mic UK shows across the country, a new website, and a music video shoot for her single "Last Night", which has received over 4.2million views as of 2023.

On 20 October 2011 Spraggan independently released her album Top Room at the Zoo. In an interview she said that the majority of her album's lyrics were inspired by a short-lived romance with an older woman of 27 that occurred when Spraggan visited America at the age of 18.

Spraggan performed as a guest act at a large volume of Live and Unsigned and Open Mic UK shows across the country during this time, on Open Mic UK, Spraggan said in an interview: "Open Mic UK is a great way to build your fan base to thousands of new fans whether you are a guest act or a competitor in the show." As a result of performing at these shows, Spraggan was scouted by several festival organisers to perform at their festivals, amongst which included London Summer Jam, Osfest, Strawberry Fields Festival Whaley Bridge Water Weekend and Cockermouth Rock Festival.

On 13 July 2012, she released the single "Tea and Toast". Spraggan auditioned for the ninth series of The X Factor, which was shown on 25 August 2012, singing her own song "Last Night" from Top Room at the Zoo (2011). She won herself a place at bootcamp after performing the song, which left the audience at the Manchester auditions chanting for more. Her second song, which was a rendition of "Halo" by Beyoncé, was shown on The Xtra Factor. Shortly after the audition was screened, the song climbed to Number 70 in the UK Singles Chart, and reached Number 2 on iTunes. However, it was soon removed from iTunes by request of The X Factor producers. On 29 August 2012, Greg James announced that "Last Night" was at number 5 on the Official Chart Update despite the song being removed from iTunes, her album Top Room at the Zoo was at number 7 on the Official Chart Update as well. On 2 September 2012 "Last Night" entered the UK Singles Chart at number 11 and Top Room at the Zoo entered the UK Albums Chart at number 22.

Spraggan sang "Moves like Jagger" by Maroon 5 at bootcamp but the performance was described as "awkward" and "messy". She returned to the stage with a mix-up of songs that she really liked and meant a lot to her. Tulisa then said that she wanted to hear one of her tracks so Spraggan decided to sing "Tea and Toast", stating that the song was about a real couple. After she performed the song she burst into tears when she received a standing ovation from the audience and the judging panel.

She made it through to the live shows as one of the three female singers selected by mentor Tulisa. In week 4, Spraggan was ill so she automatically got through to week 5. On 3 November, she decided to leave the competition because she felt that it wouldn't be fair to get another free pass to the next round, as she was still too ill to compete. Spraggan later revealed that the real reason why she left the show was that she was raped during the production of the show.

==== Performances on The X Factor ====
Episode	Theme	Song	Result
Audition	Free choice	"Last Night" (original song)	Advanced
Bootcamp 1	Group performance	"Moves like Jagger"	Advanced
Bootcamp 2	Solo performance	"Tea and Toast" (original song)	Advanced
Judges' houses	No theme	"I Will Always Love You"	Advanced
Week 1	Heroes night	"Mountains" (original song)	Safe (5th)
Week 2	Love and heartbreak	"Gold Digger"	Safe (5th)
Week 3	Club classics	"Titanium" (version with original lyrics)	Safe (7th)
Week 4	Halloween	N/A	Withdrew (9th)

=== 2012–2016: Join the Club and I Hope You Don't Mind Me Writing ===
Spraggan announced her signing to record label Columbia Records in March 2013. Her debut studio album Join the Club was released on 7 October 2013.

About the album Spraggan said "I wanted to put my own take on events that happen to everyone by telling these stories. I have been writing this album for as long as I can remember and I hope people will be able to relate." The lead single "Lighthouse" was released 14 July. About the single Spraggan explains 'Whenever I'd run out of money or get on the wrong bus, I'd see a lighthouse and things would start to getting better'. Spraggan confirmed the second single lifted from the album would be "Last Night (Beer Fear)" was released on 30 September.

Spraggan announced a headline UK and Ireland tour in support of the album which started at Margate Winter Gardens on 21 October and concluded at The Academy in Dublin on 16 November.

November 2014 Spraggan showcased new music she'd been working on since The X Factor. On 17 January via Facebook she announced the title of her second studio album titled We Are, which was released on 4 May 2015, and the first single "Unsinkable" released on 12 March 2015. Following the album's release Spraggan embarked on "The Unsinkable Tour". In 2015, Spraggan wrote and sang the "catchy" lyrics for the TV advert for online fashion store Simplybeyou. Later in 2015 Spraggan was signed to CTRL Records. On 3 February 2016 Spraggan announced, via social media, that her new EP would be called Home and due to be released on 9 February. The EP contained 3 new songs called "Home", "Yes, This One's for You" and "Skylights". It also included a new version of "Tea and Toast" which explained the story behind the song. On 9 November 2016, Spraggan announced her fourth studio album I Hope You Don't Mind Me Writing, which was released on 27 January 2017. On 8 December 2016 the music video for the first single from the album "Modern Day Frankenstein" became available to view online with the pre-order for the album following 10 December 2016.

=== 2017–2019: Dear You Tour, summer festivals and new record label ===
Spraggan announced a headline European tour to promote her studio album I Hope You Don't Mind Me Writing (2017), starting at The Waterfront, Norwich on 1 March and concluding at the Gruner Salon, Berlin on 28 March 2017. The tour consisted of 18 dates in total. Summer festival highlights for Spraggan included performances at Hope & Glory (Wonders of the Age Stage), Isle of Wight (Big Top Stage), Glastonbury (Acoustic) and Tramlines (Sheffield).

On 19 May 2017 Spraggan announced via her social media pages that she was going to embark on a 31 date UK tour throughout September and October of that year. Following a number of showcase performances at SXSW Festival in Austin, Texas in March 2018, Spraggan signed to Cooking Vinyl Records & Publishing. Soon after this, she was added to the roster on ATC Live for UK & European live bookings and APA for Northern America. Spraggan is set to tour the US & Canada throughout September 2018, followed by a substantial UK tour and European dates through October and into November. She is currently writing new material for a new album due out in Spring 2019 to be released through Cooking Vinyl and will be performing at festivals including Kendal Calling, Y Not and Belladrum over the Summer.

At the beginning of 2019, she toured with Melissa Etheridge for three weeks in Europe on Etheridge's "Yes I Am" 25th Anniversary Tour. Released in May 2019, Today Was a Good Day contained 14 song including "Stick the Kettle On", a song about being there for people who are suffering with their mental health, "Lucky Stars", "Thanks for Choosing Me", "End of the World", and "Don't Play This on the Radio". A deluxe edition was released with extra tracks from her live concerts: "Fight for it", "Loaded Gun Blues", "Unsinkable" and "Lucky Stars".

=== 2021–present: Choices, Balance and autobiography ===
Spraggan's sixth studio album, Choices, was released on 26 February 2021 and debuted at number 5 on the UK Albums Chart. The album was preceded by the singles "Flowers", "Roots" and "Sober". On 19 March 2021, Spraggan released "Animal (Skank Butcher Remix)" as a promotional single.

On 21 May 2021, Spraggan released a cover version of the 1999 S Club 7 single, "Bring It All Back". On 28 May 2021, Spraggan announced her UK tour, due to commence 25 October 2021.

In August 2022, Spraggan announced UK and Ireland shows for spring 2023. In late 2022, it was announced that Spraggan had signed with Simon Cowell's record publishing label, Syco Music. On 7 December 2022, Spraggan released the single "Balance", which she co-wrote alongside Aron Bicksy and Philip Magee, and announced her upcoming studio album of the same name, due for release in April 2023.

On 8 December 2022, Spraggan announced her memoir, Process, would be released in July 2023. On writing her memoir, Spraggan said, "It's been horrendous [...] Going through everything that's ever traumatised you with a fine-tooth comb: it has been horrendous but wonderful, too [...] I've always spoken about how I truly feel, so I guess I'm a bit of an open book."

On 16 December 2022, the "Balance" single peaked at number 12 on the UK Official Singles Downloads Chart Top 100. Spraggan followed this release with two more singles: "OCD" on 3 March 2023, and "Bodies" on 19 April 2023.

On 2 May 2024, Spraggan released a duet version of "Sober" which features Robbie Williams.

In 2025, Spraggan came joint first on the seventh series of the Celebrity series SAS: Who Dares Wins.

== Personal life ==
=== Family ===
Spraggan was born in Canterbury, but at a young age, moved with her family to Buxton in Derbyshire. She attended Buxton Community School and the University of Derby, and currently resides in Manchester, England. She stated in her X Factor appearance, when she was asked about her job by judge Tulisa, that "I am the person with a clipboard in the street that you try to avoid. I sell baby photos for 99p". Her mother, Anstey, is a freelance journalist.

=== Relationships ===
Spraggan came out as gay at 14 years old and married Georgina Gordon on 18 June 2016; the couple separated on 12 November 2019. On 31 March 2024, Spraggan announced her engagement to long-time friend Emilia Smith. They married at Saltmarshe Hall in Yorkshire in June 2024; Simon Cowell walked Spraggan down the aisle.

=== Sexual assault ===
In a 2023 interview, Spraggan revealed that she had been raped by a hotel porter in 2012, after a night out for Rylan Clark's birthday during the production of The X Factor. After taking PEP following the attack to prevent possible HIV infection, she became too ill from its side-effects to continue the show. The perpetrator admitted the offence and was jailed for ten years.

== Discography ==
- Top Room at the Zoo (2011)
- Join the Club (2013)
- We Are (2015)
- I Hope You Don't Mind Me Writing (2017)
- Today Was a Good Day (2019)
- Choices (2021)
- Balance (2023)
- Other Sides of the Moon (2025)
