= Top Room at the Zoo =

Studio album by Lucy Spraggan
- Released: 20 October 2011
- Recorded: 2011
- Genre: Pop
- Length: 35:19
- Label: Independent

Lucy Spraggan chronology
Top Room at the Zoo (2011)	Join the Club (2013)

Top Room at the Zoo is the debut independently released album by the English singer-songwriter Lucy Spraggan. It was released in the United Kingdom on 20 October 2011. The album includes the song "Last Night", which she performed at The X Factor auditions in 2012.

== Background ==
Originally, Spraggan released the album independently in the United Kingdom on 20 October 2011. After she sang "Last Night" at The X Factor auditions, the album peaked to number 2 on iTunes but the album had to be removed upon request of the producers of The X Factor due to a rule change. She was told to take down her album and informed that all other X Factor contestants that year had also been banned until the show was over, in order to give them the same level of exposure. In an interview, Spraggan said a short-lived romance with an older woman of 27, when she visited America at the age of 18, inspired the majority of her album's lyrics.

== Track listing ==
No.	Title	Length
1.	"Someone"	2:26
2.	"Butterflies"	2:38
3.	"91"	3:35
4.	"Last Night"	2:09
5.	"You're Too Young"	4:23
6.	"Join the Club"	2:07
7.	"In a State"	2:46
8.	"Summer '08"	4:00
9.	"'Til Death"	3:30
10.	"Let Go"	4:10
11.	"Paper Dreams"	3:35

== Chart performance ==
On 29 August 2012, the album was at number 7 on the Official Chart Update despite the album being removed from iTunes. On 30 August 2012, the album entered the Irish Albums Chart at number 72. On 2 September 2012, the album entered the UK Albums Chart at number 22.

=== Weekly charts ===
Chart (2012)	Peak position
Irish Albums (IRMA)	72
Scottish Albums (Official Charts)	19
UK Albums (Official Charts)	22
UK Album Downloads (Official Charts)	8
UK Independent Albums (Official Charts)	2

== Release history ==
Region	Release date	Format	Label
United Kingdom	20 October 2011	Digital download	Independent
