= Matt Cardle discography =

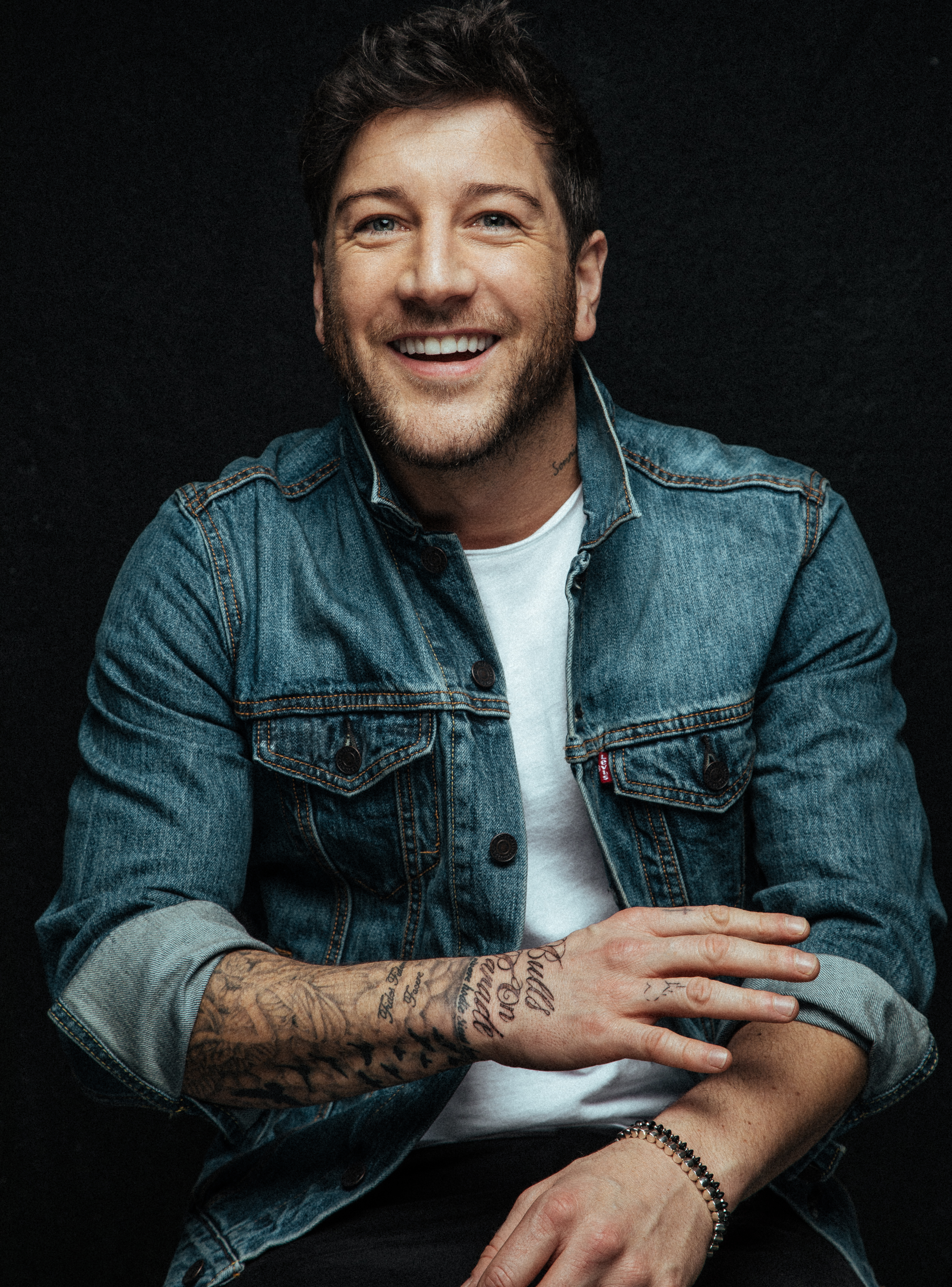
- Studio albums: 5
- EPs: 1
- Singles: 24
- Music videos: 10

The discography of the English singer Matt Cardle consists of four studio albums, one live album, twenty-foursingles, one EP and eleven music videos.

Cardle signed a joint deal with Syco and Columbia Records after winning the seventh series of The X Factor. His winner's single "When We Collide" topped the UK Singles Chart to become the 2010 Christmas number 1 and remained there for three consecutive weeks. In June 2012 the song reached the one million sale mark, making it the 123rd single to sell a million copies in the UK and the fourth by an X Factor contestant. In Ireland it is the fourth best selling single of all time. His debut album, Letters, was released in the UK on 17 October 2011. The album's first single, "Run For Your Life," written by Gary Barlow, peaked at number 6 on the UK Singles Chart. Letters debuted at number 2 on the UK Albums chart and spent 16 consecutive weeks in the top 40. Two further singles from the album were released, "Starlight" and "Amazing".

Following his split from Columbia/Syco, Cardle's second album, The Fire was released on 29 October 2012 through So What Recordings, part of the Silva Screen Music Group. The album debuted at number 8 in the UK album chart. Cardle then released his third album, Porcelain, independently in 2013 . It reached number 11 on the UK album chart. The first single, a duet with Melanie C called "Loving You", was released on 18 August 2013 and reached number 14 on the UK Singles Chart. Two further singles were released, "When You Were My Girl" and "Hit My Heart".

Cardle returned to Sony in 2017 and released his fourth album, Time to Be Alive, with them on 27 April 2018.

Cardle announced the release of "Purple Crayon" on 12 January 2021, ahead of the release of his fifth studio album. The song was released digitally on 15 January 2021. Cardle says, "Purple Crayon is song about my struggles with addiction to Valium and the escape I found through using it. The song's emotions are intertwined with imagery from my favourite children's book Harold and the Purple Crayon."

Cardle's fifth studio album, The Great Escape, is due for release on 3 July 2026, and was released on 3 July 2026; the album was by seven singles. As of 2025, he has sold in excess of three million records.

== Albums ==
=== Studio albums ===
Title	Details	Peak chart positions			Certifications & Sales
Title	Details	UK	IRE	SCO	Certifications & Sales
Letters	Released: 17 October 2011; Label: Syco, Sony, Columbia; Format: CD, digital download	2	2	2	UK: Platinum; IRE: Gold
The Fire	Released: 29 October 2012; Label: So What Recordings; Format: CD, digital download	8	14	8	UK: Silver
Porcelain	Released: 28 October 2013; Label: Absolute; Format: CD, digital download, vinyl	11	75	22	
Time to Be Alive	Released: 27 April 2018; Label: Sony Music; Format: CD, digital download, vinyl	28	—	22	
The Great Escape	Released: 3 July 2026; Label: London Multimedia Limited; Format: CD, vinyl, cassette, digital download, streaming	— (Note: The Great Escape did not enter the UK Albums Chart, but debuted at number 26 on the UK Albums Downloads Chart, on 10 July 2026.)	—	—	

=== Live albums ===
Title	Details
Intimate and Live	Released: 18 November 2016; Label: Absolute; Format: CD

=== EPs ===
Title	Details
Purple Crayon	Released: 18 June 2021; Label: Matt Cardle; Last Man Music; Format: Digital download; streaming

== Singles ==
=== As lead artist ===
Title	Year	Peak chart positions				Album
Title	Year	UK	UK Indie	IRE	SCO	Album
"When We Collide"	2010	1	—	1	1	Letters
"Run for Your Life"	2011	6	—	12	6	Letters
"Starlight"	2011	185	—	—	—	Letters
"Amazing"	2012	84	—	—	—	Letters
"It's Only Love"	2012	175	18	—	—	The Fire
"Anyone Else"	2012	—	—	—	—	The Fire
"Lately"	2013	—	—	—	—	The Fire
"Loving You" (with Melanie C)	2013	14	2	42	11	Porcelain
"When You Were My Girl"	2013	—	36	—	—	Porcelain
"Hit My Heart"	2014	171	20	—	—	Porcelain
"I Can't Make You Love Me" (Live)	2016	—	—	—	—	Intimate & Live
"Desire"	2018	—	—	—	—	Time to Be Alive
"Time to Be Alive"	2018	—	—	—	—	Time to Be Alive
"Blind Faith"	2018	—	—	—	—	Time to Be Alive
"I'm Not Letting Go"	2018	—	—	—	—	Time to Be Alive
"Nobody"	2018	—	—	—	—	Time to Be Alive
"Purple Crayon"	2021	—	—	—	—	Purple Crayon - EP
"We're the Butterflies"	2021	—	—	—	—	Purple Crayon - EP
"Drinking Dreams"	2025	—	—	—	—	The Great Escape
"Fading Lights"	2026	—	—	—	—	The Great Escape
"Mirrorball"	2026	—	—	—	—	The Great Escape
"You Take The Sun"	2026	—	—	—	—	The Great Escape
"Painkiller"	2026	—	—	—	—	The Great Escape
"Stilettos"	2026	—	—	—	—	The Great Escape
"Broken"	2026	—	—	—	—	The Great Escape
"—" denotes single that did not chart or was not released.

=== As featured artist ===
Title	Year	Peak chart positions			Album
Title	Year	UK	IRE	SCO	Album
"Heroes" (as part of The X Factor finalists)	2010	1	1	1	Non-album single

== Other charted songs ==
Title	Year	Peak chart positions		Album
Title	Year	UK	UK Indie	Album
"The First Time Ever I Saw Your Face"	2012	92	9	The Fire

== Promotional singles ==
Title	Year	Album
"Nobody" (Matt Cardle with W.LDN.SOUNDSYSTEM & ScoobE)	2019	Non-album single

== Other appearances ==
Title	Year	Album
"The Power of Love" (Trevor Horn featuring the Sarm Orchestra and Matt Cardle)	2010	Reimagines the Eighties

== Music videos ==
Title	Year	Director(s)
"When We Collide"	2011	Andy Morahan
"Run for Your Life"	2011	Howard Greenhalgh
"Starlight"	2011	Sean De Sparengo
"Amazing"	2012	Sean De Sparengo
"It's Only Love"	2012	Nick Spanos
"Anyone Else"	2012	Chanya Button
"Lately"	2013	Nick Spanos
"Loving You"	2013	Jonny Kight
"When You Were My Girl"	2013	Nick Spanos
"Desire"	2018	Tim Fox
"Nobody"	2018	Sean Robinson
