= Unplugged Tour (Matt Cardle) =

2013 concert tour by Matt Cardle

- Tour by Matt Cardle
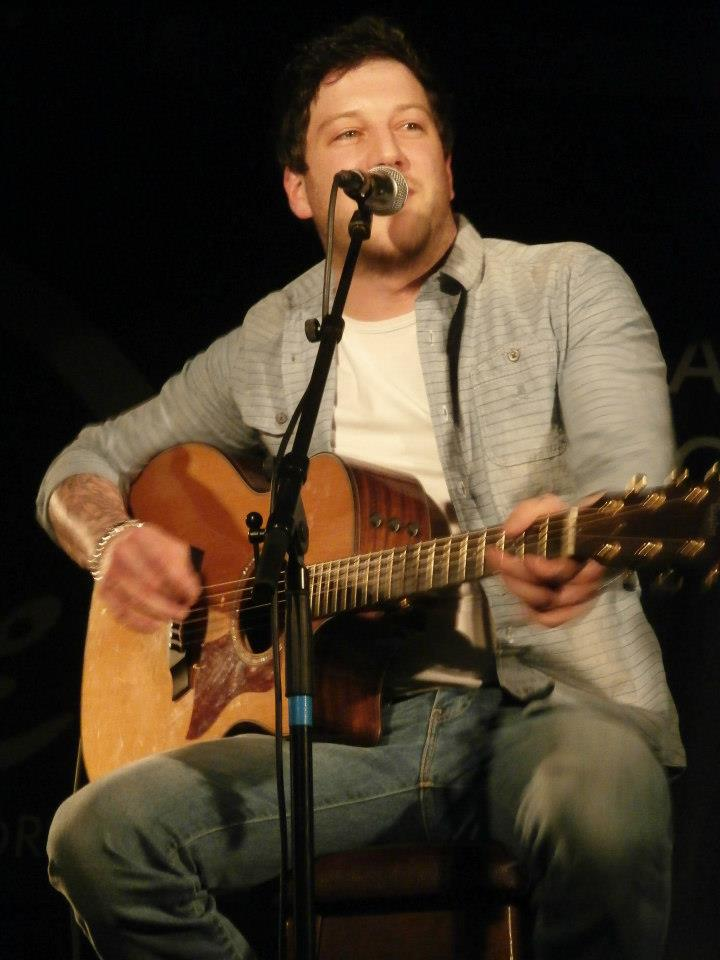
- Matt Cardle performing in Glasgow on his Unplugged Tour
- Associated albums: Letters; The Fire
- Start date: April 23, 2013
- End date: May 2, 2013
- No. of shows: 8

Matt Cardle concert chronology
- Letters Tour (2012); Unplugged Tour (2013); Porcelain Tour (2014)

The Unplugged Tour was an eight date concert tour by Matt Cardle. In contrast to his previous tours, the Letters Tour and promotional tours, it was not specifically in support of his most recent album, rather a set of songs from both his albums and other tracks that have meant a lot to him. It was the first he had done without the backing of a full live band. Cardle played acoustic guitar for the majority of the songs, but had the addition of Paul Bullen on keyboard for the middle portion of the set and the encore. No other instrumentation was used. All dates sold out.

== Background ==
The tour was announced on 10 December 2012 with tickets on general sale on 12 December. Cardle explained the reason behind it being unplugged was that it hadn't been long since doing a big production tour and he wanted to strip it down and make it a more intimate show, especially for fans who prefer his acoustic side. The tour began on 23 April 2013 in Cork. The first half of the set included songs from his first album, Letters, and covers of songs that have been part of his musical journey, such as the first song that really inspired him, "Thank U" by Alanis Morissette and the song he performed for his first audition on The X Factor, "I'm No Good" by Amy Winehouse. The second half consisted of songs from his most recent album, The Fire.

== Reception ==
Dean McAdam of Herald Scotland said Cardle is "comfortably establishing himself as something just a little different from the rest" and claims that the acoustic approach suits him well. Phil Allely of Fame Magazine said he "ticked every box imaginable " and "Cardle was on the ball for start to finish, he built the crowd up perfectly and ended on the perfect high he possibly could." Bernard O'Rourke of Golden Plec said "it is clear that he has left the manufactured reality show pop version of a singer-songwriter behind, it just isn’t clear what exactly he’s grown into."

== Setlist ==
1. "Letters"
2. "Thank U"
3. "You Know I'm No Good"
4. "When We Collide"
5. "Faithless"
6. "Lost & Found"
7. "Amazing"
8. "Set Fire to the Rain"
9. "Millionaire"
10. "All That Matters"
11. "Water"
12. "Anyone Else"
13. "It's Only Love"

Encore:

1. "Lately" (Added from Manchester onwards)
2. "The First Time Ever I Saw Your Face"

== Tour dates ==
| Date | City | Country | Venue |
|---|---|---|---|
| April 23, 2013 | Cork | Ireland | Cyprus Avenue |
| April 24, 2013 | Dublin | Ireland | Whelans |
| April 25, 2013 | Belfast | Northern Ireland | Empire Music Hall |
| April 27, 2013 | Glasgow | Scotland | Oran Mor |
| April 28, 2013 | Coventry | England | Arts Centre Theatre |
| April 29, 2013 | Manchester | England | Lowry Theatre |
| May 1, 2013 | Cambridge | England | Junction |
| May 2, 2013 | London | England | Union Chapel |
