= Porcelain Tour =

2014 concert tour by Matt Cardle

- Tour by Matt Cardle
- Associated album: Porcelain
- Start date: 1 April 2014
- End date: 25 April 2014
- No. of shows: 20

Matt Cardle concert chronology
- Unplugged Tour (2013); Porcelain Tour (2014); Intimate and Live Tour (2016)

The Porcelain Tour was a 19 date concert tour by Matt Cardle in support of his 2013 album Porcelain. It took place over Ireland and the UK through April 2014, ending in Telford on 25 April.

== Background ==
The tour was announced on 30 October 2013, with tickets on general sale on 4 November 2013. The tour began on 1 April 2014 in Belfast, followed by one date in Ireland then moving to Scotland and England. Cardle played guitar and was backed by a live band. He was joined by Melanie C on three shows to perform their duet Loving You.

== Reception ==
Joe Hoffman of The Upcoming gave 5 out of 5 stars for the show saying "He is an unbelievable musical talent, and he did not fail to bring it all to a sold out show last night at Shepherd’s Bush Empire" and "Cardle’s voice is incredible, with a falsetto that can send shivers down your spine." Ann Clarkson from Native Monster gave it a favourable review saying "The vocals sounded effortless, which is a hard trick to pull off when you have a massive four-octave range and use most of that during one evening."

== Setlist ==
1. Your Kind Of Love
2. Starlight
3. All For Nothing
4. The Fire
5. In Chains
6. Not Over You
7. Faithless
8. When We Collide
9. Water (Belfast only)
10. Lately (Belfast and London only)
11. It's Only Love (Performed as encore in London)
12. Hit My Heart
13. Letters
14. When You Were My Girl
15. This Trouble Is Ours
16. Porcelain

Encore:

1. Loving You (Performed with Mel C in Manchester, Liverpool and London)

== Tour dates ==
Date	City	Country	Venue
April 1, 2014	Belfast	Northern Ireland	Mandela Hall
April 2, 2014	Dublin	Ireland	The Academy
April 4, 2014	Edinburgh	Scotland	Queens Hall
April 5, 2014	Glasgow	Scotland	The Arches
April 6, 2014	Newcastle	England	O2 Academy Newcastle
April 8, 2014	Sheffield	England	O2 Academy Sheffield
April 9, 2014	Manchester	England	The Ritz
April 10, 2014	Liverpool	England	O2 Academy Liverpool
April 12, 2014	Birmingham	England	O2 Academy Birmingham
April 13, 2014	Oxford	England	O2 Academy Oxford
April 14, 2014	Bournemouth	England	O2 Academy Bournemouth
April 16, 2014	Worthing	England	Pavilion Theatre
April 17, 2014	Bath	England	Komedia
April 18, 2014	London	England	Shepherd's Bush Empire
April 20, 2014	High Wycombe	England	Swan Theatre
April 21, 2014	Chester	England	The Live Rooms
April 22, 2014	Coventry	England	Arts Centre Theatre
April 24, 2014	Bristol	England	O2 Academy Bristol
April 25, 2014	Telford	England	Oakengates Theatre
