= Letters Tour =

2012 concert tour by Matt Cardle

- Tour by Matt Cardle
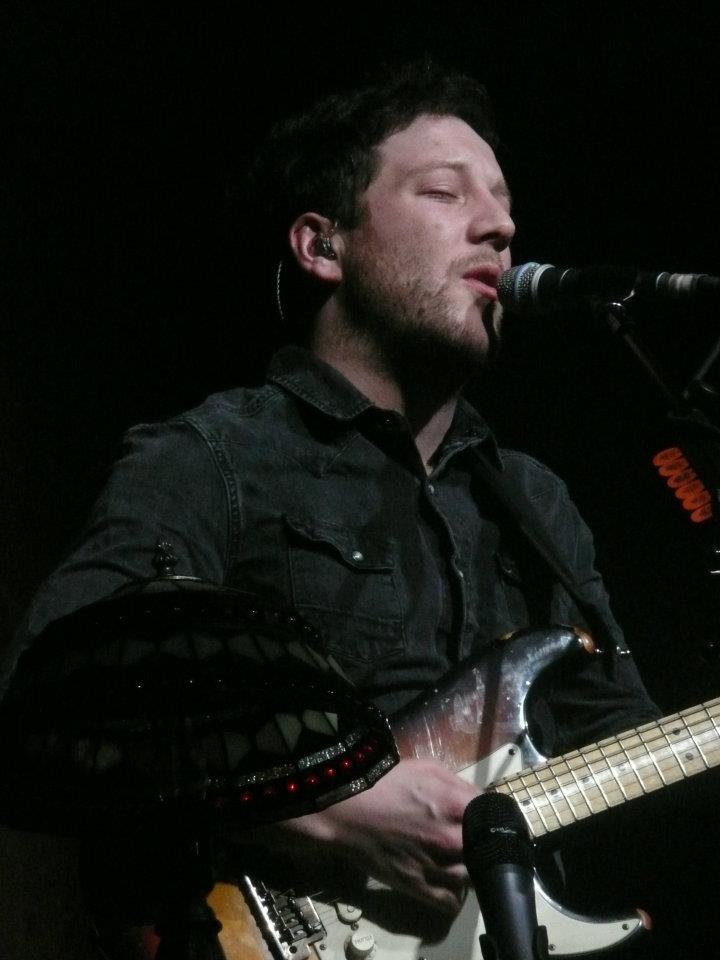
- Associated album: Letters
- Start date: February 28, 2012
- End date: March 29, 2012
- No. of shows: 23

Matt Cardle concert chronology
- The X Factor Live Tour (2011); Letters Tour (2012); Unplugged (2013)

The Letters Tour was the debut concert tour by Matt Cardle in support of his debut solo album. It included 23 dates across the UK and Ireland in early 2012. The tour sold out causing an extra date to be added. It received largely positive reviews.

== Background ==
The tour was announced on 24 October 2011 with tickets on general sale on 28 October. A second date in Dublin was added due to the first selling out. The tour began on 28 February 2012 in Wales. He performed all of the album tracks on the first two shows, as well as "Run For Your Life" B-side "Lost & Found". On the third show into the tour he took "Reflections" out of the set list and added a cover of "The First Time Ever I Saw Your Face", a song which he'd received high praise for on The X Factor.

As well as playing acoustic and electric guitar himself, Cardle had a live band backing him, the same band he plays with for promotional appearances and gigs. They are Remy Mallett on bass, Lorenzo De Feo on lead guitar, pianist Paul Bullen and Tom Peters on drums. The support act on the tour was Kyle Parry on the first two dates and Roxanne Emery thereafter.

== Reception ==
The tour received largely positive reviews. Becca Longmire from Entertainment Wise said "Cardle’s voice is amazing, a real natural talent" and "few people seem to be able to portray such emotion through their music, but with Matt it just seemed natural." Amy Senior of Mancunian Matters said "His voice is faultless and his guitar skills more than just a stage novelty and yet unlike most talent show finalists his presence is down to earth and unrehearsed." Lucy Needham of Retford Today said "Matt shows off his impressive vocal range as he skips between notes with incredible ease." Fraser Wilson from the Nottingham Post said "time dragged during the opening section of his 70-minute show" but "the singer turned things around in style with a handful of pitch-perfect ballads...you could truly understand why so many people picked up their phones and voted for him."

Daniel Cairns from AAA Music wrote "everyone is shown that he has more to offer than just being an X Factor winner." Backstage Pass said he "shows his lack of natural confidence between songs but tonight is about music and music alone. His songs are powerful - his impeccable voice could stand alongside anyone and not be embarrassed." Jackie Davies of South Wales Argus said "his ballads sit equally well alongside the more upbeat, rock inspired numbers" and "he is a natural and affable performer."

== Setlist ==
1. Stars & Lovers
2. Amazing
3. Letters
4. Walking On Water
5. Slowly
6. Faithless
7. Lost & Found
8. The First Time Ever I Saw Your Face (Replaced Reflections on the third show)
9. Beat Of A Breaking Heart
10. All For Nothing
11. Pull Me Under
12. Starlight

Encore:

1. When We Collide
2. Run For Your Life

== Tour dates ==
Date	City	Country	Venue
February 28, 2012	Rhyl	Wales	Rhyl Pavilion
February 29, 2012	Rhyl	Wales	Rhyl Pavilion
March 1, 2012	York	England	York Barbican
March 3, 2012	Cambridge	England	Cambridge Corn Exchange
March 4, 2012	Oxford	England	Apollo New Theatre
March 5, 2012	Birmingham	England	Symphony Hall
March 7, 2012	Nottingham	England	Nottingham Royal Concert Hall
March 8, 2012	Bournemouth	England	O2 Academy Bournemouth
March 10, 2012	Swindon	England	Oasis
March 11, 2012	Portsmouth	England	Portsmouth Guildhall
March 12, 2012	Southend	England	Cliffs Pavilion
March 14, 2012	Liverpool	England	Royal Liverpool Philharmonic
March 15, 2012	Glasgow	Scotland	O2 Academy Glasgow
March 16, 2012	Newcastle	England	Newcastle City Hall
March 18, 2012	Belfast	Northern Ireland	Waterfront Hall
March 19, 2012	Dublin	Ireland	Olympia
March 20, 2012	Dublin	Ireland	Olympia
March 22, 2012	Manchester	England	O2 Apollo Manchester
March 24, 2012	Cardiff	Wales	St David's Hall
March 25, 2012	Bristol	England	Colston Hall
March 26, 2012	Plymouth	England	Plymouth Pavilions
March 28, 2012	Brighton	England	Brighton Dome
March 29, 2012	London	England	Hammersmith Apollo
