= Porcelain Tower =

Porcelain Tower may refer to:

- Porcelain Tower of Nanjing, an historical site in China
- The Porcelain Tower, a set of musical variations by Nikita Koshkin

== See also ==
- Porcelain Tour
