= Darwyn =

- Origin: Essex, England
- Genres: Rock, alternative rock
- Years active: 2005–2010
- Label: RCA Records (2006–10)
- Past members: Matt Cardle; Ali McMillan; Richard Grace
- Website: http://www.myspace.com/darwyn

Darwyn were an alternative rock and acoustic band from Essex. The band featured Matt Cardle as the lead singer and acoustic guitar player. The other Darwyn members were Ali McMillan on drums and percussion and Richard Grace on piano. The band members met at Lights Music Action and formed Darwyn in 2005.

== Career ==
=== 2005: Formation ===
The band, who described themselves as acoustic rock, recorded the 11 track album When You Wake in 2006, which included the tracks "Violet" and "When You Wake". They were subsequently awarded an Arts Council England grant which they used to record the follow-up EP Little Sunlight in 2007 which included the track "Junior". The band played at many festivals including Stortford Music Festival and Brownstock Festival and regularly played at the venue and recording studio Highbarn in Essex.

Cardle and McMillan also played as a two-piece under the name Darwyn playing acoustic cover versions of popular songs in venues in and around the Suffolk area and videos of them playing together have gained many views on YouTube.

=== 2006: When You Wake ===
Darwyn released their Studio album When You Wake in 2006.

=== 2007-08: Little Sunlight ===
In 2007 Darwyn released their second album Little Sunlight.

=== 2009-10: Split up ===
In 2010, the band split and Cardle joined a new band called Seven Summers.

== Discography ==
=== Studio albums ===
Year	Album
2006	When You Wake: Formats: CD, digital download; Track list: 1. "You Know" (4:01); 2. "Right Through Me" (3:48); 3. "Waiting" (3:58); 4. "Matahari" (5:20); 5. "Straight to the A Game" (3:58); 6. "Are You Blind" (3:55); 7. "Violet" (4:20); 8. "Fall in Line" (3:48); 9. "Growing Out" (4:39); 10. "When You Wake" (3:43); 11. "The Girl and I" (5:45)
2007	Little Sunlight: Formats: CD, digital download; Track list: 1. "Little Sunlight" (4:30); 2. "Give It Away" (4:00); 3. "Junior" (3:01); 4. "Outside" (4:10); 5. "Free Wheeler" (3:50); 6. "Walk With Me" (3:17); 7. "Electro Sex Show" (3:52)
