= Anyone Else =

Anyone Else may refer to:

- "Anyone Else" (Collin Raye song), 1999
- "Anyone Else" (Matt Cardle song), 2012
