= Porcelain (Matt Cardle album) =

Studio album by Matt Cardle
- Released: 25 October 2013
- Recorded: 2012–2013
- Genre: Pop rock
- Length: 38:59
- Label: Absolute
- Producers: Matt Cardle (also exec.), Ben Cullum, Ash Howes, Tom Peters, Dan McDougall, Jamie Scott, Toby Smith, Will Talbot (exec.)

Matt Cardle chronology
The Fire (2012)	Porcelain (2013)	Intimate and Live (2016)

Matt Cardle studio album chronology
The Fire (2012)	Porcelain (2013)	Time to Be Alive (2018)

Singles from Porcelain
- 1. "Loving You" Released: 18 August 2013; 2. "When You Were My Girl" Released: 13 October 2013; 3. "Hit My Heart" Released: 30 March 2014

Porcelain is the third studio album released by English musician Matt Cardle. The album was released on 25 October 2013 in Ireland, and on 28 October in the United Kingdom. Recording locations include London, Los Angeles and New York. It is primarily written by Cardle but, as with his previous albums, he worked with various songwriters, including Conner Reeves and American R&B artist Brian McKnight. Cardle has also produced the album and played the majority of the instruments.

The lead single was a duet with Spice Girl Melanie C, called "Loving You" which was released on 18 August 2013 and reached number 14 on the UK Singles Chart. A second single, "When You Were My Girl", was released on 13 October 2013. The album was released on digital download and physical CD as well as a very limited number of vinyl copies available through Cardle's official website. Porcelain is Cardle's first album to be released worldwide.

The Porcelain Tour in support of the album took place over the UK and Ireland in April 2014. The album received largely positive reviews. It reached number 11 on the UK Albums Chart, number 3 in the Independent Album Chart and number 22 on the Scottish Album Chart.

== Background ==
After completion of his previous record, The Fire, Cardle continued writing and recording, using incomplete tracks to start working towards a third album. Cardle confirmed he was in the process of making a third album on 16 April 2013 in a video message to his fans on Facebook. On 14 May 2013 at the European Charts Launch Party, Cardle spoke about where he was in the process of making the album at that point, saying for him it was the "difficult third album" as opposed to the difficult second. He also described the album as a lot more diverse than his previous records. In later interviews he revealed has been pushing his vocal range more and experimenting with different instruments.

On 15 July 2013, it was announced that he had teamed up with Absolute Marketing for the release, his manager explaining, "When considering who to partner with on the project, it was always imperative that Matt and I be able to remain fully in control of the A&R process, creative direction and ultimately the allocation of an agreed promotional and marketing budget." On 8 October 2013 Cardle announced he has signed a worldwide publishing deal with BMG Chrysalis, giving them ownership of his back catalogue as a result of the Sony/ATV/EMI merge, and making it his first album to be released internationally.

For the lead single Cardle released a duet with Melanie C called "Loving You" which was premiered on BBC Radio 2 on 2 July 2013. A Spanish version called "Te Amo" was also recorded and released. The video premiered on 21 July 2013 and the single released 18 August 2013. It reached number 14 on the UK Singles Chart making it Cardle's first Top 40 single since "Run For Your Life".

The album title was announced on 19 August 2013, along with the album cover. Further details were released on 8 September 2013 on Cardles website, including an announcement of the second single, "When You Were My Girl" and descriptions of some other tracks: ‘Hit My Heart’ "begins deceptively with its ethereal intro and stop-start rhythmic verses but eventually develops into a chorus that’s pure euphoria and allows him to demonstrate his skills as an arranger and producer", "‘Not Over You’ finds Cardle at his most tender. Co-written with Brian McKnight, the song features a lavish string arrangement and vulnerability in the vocal performance that he himself admits, caught him slightly off guard", and "In Chains" has "trip-hop leanings and tortured lyrics, this is a song reminiscent of Portishead’s early work and certainly finds him exploring new territory.".

== Reception ==
Professional ratings
Review scores
Source	Rating
Female First	4/5 stars
Renowned for Sound	4/5 stars
Daily Mirror	4/5 stars
Yorkshire News	4.5/5 stars
Click Music	3/5 stars
Entertainment Focus	4/5 stars
Yahoo! omg!	Positive
Hit The Floor Magazine	6/10 stars

Female First said "Pushing both his vocals and the range of instruments and beats used for this offering, Matt is back and better than he's ever been" and suggest the album appeals to a wider audience than he has with his previous records. Francesca Tichon of Renowned for Sound concludes that the album is "a great offering of pop/rock with a sprinkling of soul; an album that truly shines with the artists awesome vocals and musical range." Jeremy Williams from Yorkshire News gave it 4.5 out of 5 stars, calling it an "ambitious, soulful tease" and says "Cardle should no longer be listed as a flopstar, but simply viewed as a striking, compelling musician."

Jon OBrien from Yahoo says the album is "a confident and surprisingly eclectic third effort which makes Simon Cowell and his army's decision to brush him under the carpet appear even more foolish." Owen Tonks from The Mirror also gave a positive review saying it "brilliantly shows off his impressive talent and wide vocal range." Paul Leake from Click Music writes "It can lack the post-Syco confidence of his second album, but when the pieces do fit together, he proves his worth as a singer-songwriter on his own merits." Pip Ellwood from Entertainment Focus says the album "is a progression rather than a rehash" and that Cardle "doesn't get the credit he deserves and actually he's one of the best stars The X Factor has produced."

== Singles ==
- "Loving You" was released as the lead single from the album 18 August 2013. The track was premiered on 2 July 2013 and the video was released on 21 July 2013. The single charted at number 14 on the UK Singles Chart and sold 30,000 copies in the first two weeks and number 2 on the UK Indie Chart.
- "When You Were My Girl" was announced as the second single from the album on his official website on 8 September 2013. The video was directed and shot by Nick Spanos in Los Angeles on 16 September 2013. The single was premiered on BBC Radio 2 on 30 September and was released on 13 October 2013. It reached number 36 on the UK Indie chart.
- "Hit My Heart" was announced as the third single on 2 February 2014, to be released 6 April 2014. A red vinyl is available with the radio edit and instrumental of the song, as well as a physical CD with a new song "It's All Just Talk" and acoustic versions of his first single "When We Collide" and album track "This Trouble Is Ours".

== Track listing ==
No.	Title	Writer(s)	Producer(s)	Length
1.	"In Chains"	Matt Cardle, Dan McDougall	Matt Cardle, Dan McDougall^{[b]}	4:50
2.	"Loving You" (featuring Melanie C)	Cardle, Jez Ashurst, Will Talbot, Jamie Scott, Melanie Chisholm	Cardle, Scott, Toby Smith	3:37
3.	"When You Were My Girl"	Cardle, Talbot, Scott, Smith, JC Chasez, Jimmy Harry	Cardle, Smith, Scott	2:58
4.	"Hit My Heart"	Cardle, Ben Cullum, Talbot	Cardle, Tom Peters, Ash Howes^{[a]}	3:17
5.	"A Little Too Late"	Cardle, Cullum, Talbot	Cardle, Cullum	3:37
6.	"Not Over You"	Cardle, Brian McKnight, Talbot	Cardle	4:10
7.	"Mouth to Mouth"	Cardle, Conner Reeves	Cardle	3:33
8.	"Your Kind of Love"	Cardle, Cullum	Cardle, Howes^{[a]}	3:37
9.	"This Trouble Is Ours"	Cardle, Alex Reid	Cardle	3:41
10.	"Porcelain"	Cardle, Reeves	Cardle	5:40

Notes

- ^{^a} signifies an additional producer
- ^{^b} signifies a co-producer

== Charts ==
Chart (2013)	Peak position
Irish Albums Chart	75
Irish Independent Albums Chart	13
Scottish Albums Chart	22
UK Albums Chart	11
UK Indie Chart	3

== Release history ==
Regions	Dates	Format(s)
Ireland	25 October 2013	CD, digital download, Vinyl
United Kingdom	28 October 2013	CD, digital download, Vinyl
