= Time to Be Alive =

Studio album by Matt Cardle
- Released: 27 April 2018
- Recorded: 2016–2018
- Length: 63:00
- Label: Sony
- Producer: Jim Eliot

Matt Cardle chronology
Intimate and Live (2016)	Time to Be Alive (2018)

Matt Cardle studio album chronology
Porcelain (2013)	Time to Be Alive (2018)

Singles from Time to Be Alive
- 1. "Desire" Released: 13 March 2018; 2. "Time to Be Alive" Released: 30 March 2018; 3. "Blind Faith" Released: 13 April 2018; 4. "I'm Not Letting Go Yet" Released: 8 June 2018

Time to Be Alive is the fourth solo studio album by English singer-songwriter Matt Cardle. It was released on 27 April 2018 through Sony. The lead single "Desire" was premiered on BBC Radio 2 on 13 March 2018 and made available to stream on the same day.

== Background ==
In early 2015 Cardle spoke about taking a different direction for his fourth album, with a more electronic sound than his previous work. Throughout 2015 to 2017 he played several previously unheard songs at live gigs to test them on a live audience, even embarking on a 16 date tour, the Intimate and Live Tour in summer 2016, which he described as a "warm up" for the fourth album. Describing the reasons for this he stated, "I’ve done a few live performances here and there to test out some of the new material too. I’ve found in the past that you can record an album and then tour it and wish afterwards that you’d done some of the songs differently. So this time around I’ve wanted to test the waters and perform the demos live first before making some changes. Back to front really but I’ve found it very helpful." During a gig on 18 June 2016 in Guildford he performed a new song called "Desire" for the first time, which would eventually be the lead single from the album.

It was announced on 7 November 2017 that Cardle had returned to Sony for the release of his next album, after previously being dropped by them in 2012. Speaking of the new start he said, "Signing this new deal with Sony is one of the proudest moments of my life. After the highs of X Factor I sank to the darkest places I’ve ever been. But after overcoming addiction I finally found myself in a place where I was ready and able to create the album I have always wanted to. I then spent three years pouring blood, sweat and tears plus all my darkness and my hope into this album." The song "Hallelujah" is about Cardle's experience with Vallium which he became addicted to.

On 13 March 2018, the first play of the lead single, "Desire" was played on The Ken Bruce Show on BBC Radio 2. On the same day it was announced the album, entitled Time to Be Alive, would be released on 27 April 2018 and was made available to pre-order. Two further tracks, "Time to Be Alive" and "Blind Faith" were also made available to download prior to the album release.

== Track listing ==
All tracks produced by Jim Eliot, except "Ten Ten", produced by Dimitri Tikovoï

No.	Title	Writer(s)	Length
1.	"Higher Power"	Matthew Cardle; James Eliot; Ian Barter	5:34
2.	"I'm Not Letting Go Yet"	Cardle; Eliot; Gabrielle Aplin; Jemima Stilwell; Wayne Hector	3:39
3.	"Desire"	Cardle; Eliot; Stilwell	3:47
4.	"Time to Be Alive"	Cardle; Eliot; Stilwell	3:33
5.	"Crazy Love"	Cardle; James Hayto; Eliot; James Jackman	4:16
6.	"Hallelujah"	Cardle; Daniel McDoughall	4:00
7.	"Hole in the Boat"	Cardle; Nicholas Atkinson; Katherine Eaton	3:31
8.	"Nobody"	Bryn Christopher; Eliot; Stilwell	3:12
9.	"Blind Faith"	Cardle; Eliot; Stilwell	4:29
10.	"High as the Night"	Cardle; Eliot; Stilwell	4:00
11.	"Human Nature"	Cardle; Ryan "Ashley" Campbell; Aaron Horn	5:05
12.	"Ten Ten"	Cardle; Dimitri Tikovoï; Michael Champion	3:40
13.	"Don't Be So Shy"	Cardle; Hayto; Eliot; Jackman	5:42
14.	"She"	Cardle; Hayto; Eliot; Jackman	8:02
Total length:			1:03:00

== Charts ==
Chart (2018)	Peak position
Scottish Albums (OCC)	22
UK Albums (OCC)	28
