= Anyone Else (Matt Cardle song) =

Single by Matt Cardle

from the album The Fire
- Released: 31 December 2012
- Recorded: 2012
- Genre: Indie Pop
- Length: 3:04
- Label: So What Recordings
- Songwriter(s): Matt Cardle, Jeff Halatrax
- Producer(s): Matt Cardle

Matt Cardle singles chronology
"It's Only Love" (2012)	"Anyone Else" (2012)	"Loving You" (2013)

"Anyone Else" is a song by British singer-songwriter Matt Cardle, co-written by Cardle with Jeff Halatrax. It was released as the second single from his second studio album, The Fire, on 31 December 2012. For the radio version the vocals were reworked slightly, with extra backing vocals added on the last chorus, however this version was not made available to buy. With limited national radio support and no release separate from the album digital download, which was already available, it is perhaps unsurprising that the song did not chart.

== Background ==
Cardle wrote the song in Los Angeles and it was recorded at Canvas Studios in London and Studio 217 in Los Angeles. Cardle says the song is about "not being able to make up my mind whether I want to sleep around or not!" and "To be with that one person that really means something to you." He says it the poppiest track on the album and describes it as "hooky, it's funky, it's a little more colourful".

A music video to accompany the song was premiered on YouTube on 4 December 2012, at a total length of three minutes and twenty six seconds. The video was filmed by Chanya Button at the Playhouse Theatre in London and features Cardle performing the song on the stage with his band members, as if a rehearsal for a show, with just his girlfriend watching. As the song progresses, Cardle sees the band members appearing to transform into attractive women trying to seduce him.

== Promotion ==
Cardle first performed "Anyone Else" on British television programme Daybreak, on 13 December 2012, followed by a performance on Loose Women on 4 January 2013. He then performed it on Irish entertainment programme The Saturday Night Show, on 26 January 2013.

== Release history ==
Country	Release date	Format	Label
United Kingdom	31 December 2012	Digital download	So What Recordings
