= Hit My Heart =

Single by Matt Cardle

from the album Porcelain
- Released: 6 April 2014
- Recorded: 2013
- Genre: Indie Pop
- Length: 3:17
- Songwriter(s): Matt Cardle; Ben Cullum; Will Talbot
- Producer(s): Matt Cardle; Tom Peters; Ash Howes

Matt Cardle singles chronology
| "When You Were My Girl" (2013) | "Hit My Heart" (2014) | "Desire" (2018) |

"Hit My Heart" is the third single from the album Porcelain by English recording artist Matt Cardle. The song was released in the United Kingdom on 6 April 2014 as a digital download, as well as a limited number of copies on CD and vinyl. The song was written by Cardle, his former manager Will Talbot, and Ben Cullum. It was produced by Cardle, Tom Peters and Ash Howes.

== Background ==
The song "begins deceptively with its ethereal intro and stop-start rhythmic verses but eventually develops into a chorus that’s pure euphoria and allows him to demonstrate his skills as an arranger and producer" Cardle describes it as the albums "pop moment".

A radio edit of the song was first played on Ken Bruce's show on BBC Radio 2 on 24 February 2014. The single was made available to pre-order exclusively from his official website as a red 7 inch vinyl, including the radio edit, and an instrumental, and on CD, including the radio edit, a cover of the Clive Gregson song "It's All Just Talk" and acoustic versions of "When We Collide" and album track "This Trouble Is Ours".

== Track listing ==
- Digital download
1. "Hit My Heart" (Radio Edit) – 3:17
- CD Single
1. "Hit My Heart" (Radio Edit) – 3:17
2. "It's All Just Talk"
3. "When We Collide" (Acoustic Version)
4. The Trouble Is Ours (Acoustic Version)
- Red 7 Inch Vinyl
1. "Hit My Heart" (Radio Edit) – 3:17
2. "Hit My Heart" (Instrumental) – 3:17

== Chart performance ==
=== Weekly charts ===
| Chart (2013) | Peak position |
|---|---|
| UK Indie (OCC) | 20 |

== Release history ==
| Region | Date | Format |
|---|---|---|
| United Kingdom | 6 April 2014 | Digital download |
