= Seven Summers =

British rock band

- Origin: Chelmsford, Essex, England
- Genres: Rock, alternative rock
- Years active: 2009–10, 2017–present
- Labels: Seven Summers
- Members: Matt Cardle; Alex Baker; John Holland; Neillo

Seven Summers is a British rock band from Essex. The band members are Alex Baker (drums), Jon Holland (bass), Matt Cardle (vocals and guitar) and Neillo (guitars).

== Career ==
The band released their self-titled debut album on 22 January 2010 which included the songs "Youngblood", "Way to Be" and "Dirt". This was followed later that year by the single "Picture of You".

Not having a record contract, they distributed their music independently, with the album reaching No. 30 on the Official UK Album Downloads Chart, No. 11 on the Official UK Independent Album Chart, and No. 1 on the Official UK Independent Album Breakers Charts for week ending 25 December 2010.

Following Matt's success on The X Factor in 2010, the band saw an upsurge in popularity, with their music videos gaining large numbers of views on YouTube.

The band performed live on Sue Marchant's BBC radio program on 8 December 2009. They also won the 'Panic Awards Best Band 2010' award.

In July 2018, the band reformed.

== Discography ==
=== Studio albums ===
| Year | Album |
|---|---|
| 2010 | Seven Summers: Released: 22 January 2010; Label: Seven Summers; Engineer: Tom Peters; Formats: CD, digital download; Track listing: 1. "Youngblood" (4:03); 2. "Bad News Again" (2:40); 3. "Way to Be" (3:40); 4. "Dirt" (3:50); 5. "Without You" (4:51); 6. "Find Me There" (3:56); 7. "Live Without It" (3:14); 8. "Paved Paradise" (4:44); 9. "Growing Up High" (3:11); 10. "Flesh Not Stone" (4:10); 11. "Just for a Day" (4:49) |

=== Singles ===
- 2010: "Picture of You"
