= Letters (Matt Cardle album) =

Studio album by Matt Cardle
- Released: 14 October 2011
- Recorded: 2010–2011
- Genre: Pop rock
- Length: 48:56
- Labels: Syco, Sony, Columbia
- Producers: Gary Barlow, Jon Green, Ash Howes, Eliot James, Richard "Biff" Stannard, Phil Thornalley, James Walsh, Jeremy Wheatley, Eg White

Matt Cardle chronology
Letters (2011)	The Fire (2012)

Singles from Letters
- 1. "When We Collide" Released: 12 December 2010; 2. "Run for Your Life" Released: 10 October 2011; 3. "Starlight" Released: 4 December 2011; 4. "Amazing" Released: 19 February 2012

Letters is the debut studio album by English singer-songwriter and guitarist Matt Cardle. It was released on 14 October 2011 through Syco Music, Sony Music and Columbia Records. Cardle worked with various songwriters on the album including Eg White and James Walsh. He co-wrote all the tracks except for his X Factor winner's single, "When We Collide" and the single "Run for Your Life", written by Gary Barlow.

It peaked at number two on the UK Albums Chart, behind Noel Gallagher's High Flying Birds' self-titled debut album. The Letters Tour in support of the album began in February 2012.

On 14 April 2023, a vinyl version of Letters was released to coincide with Cardle's 40th birthday.

== Background ==
After winning the seventh series of TV talent competition The X Factor, it was announced on 15 March 2011 that Cardle had signed a record deal with Simon Cowell's Syco Music, in a joint venture with Columbia Records, becoming the first X Factor winner not to be exclusively signed to Cowell's label. Cardle soon began work on his debut studio album, which just days after his X Factor win, was slated for release on 24 October 2011. On 18 August 2011, Cardle made his first official announcement regarding the album. He announced its title to be Letters, and the debut single from the album would be a Gary Barlow-penned track, "Run for Your Life". During an interview given on the day of the announcement, Cardle revealed the name of several album tracks, and the process behind writing them: "Starlight is a depressing, yet happy song about the insignificance of everything. Amazing is 'bout finding someone when you've got no-one. All for Nothing is one I wrote with my favourite all-time songwriter, Eg White. I recorded it after a couple of cups of tea and a few cigarettes, so it's quite raw."

In September 2011, it was revealed that "Run for Your Life" would be released on 10 October 2011, and the album's release was pushed forward a week to 17 October, due to popular demand from fans. Cardle appeared on the BBC Breakfast show on 1 September to give a preview of the video. The single was premiered in full on The Chris Moyles Show on 5 September 2011. The video was then premiered in full on 5 September on his YouTube channel. The single was released on 9 October 2011, Cardle performed the song on The X Factor on the same day. He also performed another track from the album, "All For Nothing", on ITV2 show The Xtra Factor. Prior to the album release Cardle went on a five date tour ending on 3 October at Koko in London. On 15 October a documentary on the making of the album entitled Into The Light was broadcast on ITV2.

== Reception ==
=== Critical reception ===
Professional ratings
Review scores
Source	Rating
Irish Independent	8/10 stars
The Daily Telegraph	2/5 stars
What Culture	3/5 stars
The Guardian	2/5 stars
The Observer	3/5 stars

Upon its release, Letters received mixed reviews from critics. Daily Express said that Cardle's vocals were "versatile and emotional" and the songs were "more than decent." The Irish Independent gave Letters eight out of ten, noting Cardle's "impressive falsetto." The BBC gave an unfavourable review, calling Letters "over-produced" and "a barrage of formulaically chugging soft-rock structures and overwhelming strings." The Daily Telegraph claimed that Cardle's vocals sound "off-key" while Digital Spy rated it two out of five stars, faulting the album for "mushy, MOR soft-rock production." The Financial Times gave the album one out of five stars, calling it "woefully formulaic, instantly forgettable debut album full of manufactured drama." The Guardian gave the album two out of five, calling Letters "an album of triumphal power ballads." The Observer rated it three out of five, calling the album "widescreen guitar pop based around overwrought choruses that demand gurning as they're belted."

The Daily Record, called the album "fantastic" and "classic," saying it had "exceeded all expectations." Pop Ledge rated Letters three out of ten, calling the over-all album "boring" and "too formulaic" while naming "Starlight" and "Stars and Lovers" as stand-out tracks and concluding with "We feel for Matt Cardle – he has talked often of the sort of artist he wants to be and it’s not this album." The Yorker noted that while there was "nothing especially awful" about "Letters", tracks were "instantly forgettable" and "utterly boring." BigLiveActs said "Letters" was "a must for Matt Cardle and X Factor fans but not much here to interest the rest of us" and suggests "A number of the songs would have been better treated with a quiet acoustic backing to Matt's voice...Presumably the end result was the wish of the producers and not Matt Cardle himself. Philip Elwood's blog Entertainment Focus rated it four out of five, calling it a "solid debut" and a "fantastic record." What Culture? awarded the album three stars, and stated that Cardle "is a very, very good singer", concluding that the album is "Solid, at times verging on very good, but ultimately inconsistent and bland." In its review, Female First, an online "celebrity gossip and lifestyle magazine," concluded that "'Letters', in all honesty, isn't a particularly adventurous record," but predicted it "will go some way to help [Cardle] establish himself as a serious musician and song-writer." According to the reviewer for Cosmoplitan magazine, "[t]he 13-track album is every bit the epic, power-ballad compilation I could’ve wished for. Big, belting choruses, meaningful lyrics and plenty of high notes to make women swoon." Orange UK gave the album a very favorable review, choosing "Letters" and "Beat of a Breaking Heart" as stand-out tracks, while praising Cardle's "excellent", "stunning", and "heartfelt" vocals Despite the mixed reviews, in December 2011, "Letters" and "Starlight" were voted album and song of the year by readers of The Guardian.

=== Commercial performance ===
The album sold more than 70,000 copies in the week of release, peaking at number two on the UK Albums Chart behind Noel Gallagher's High Flying Birds's self-titled debut album.

== Singles ==
- "When We Collide", Cardle's X Factor winner's single, is included as the final track on the album. It was released on 12 December 2010. The single contained Cardle's live performances of "The First Time Ever I Saw Your Face", "Just the Way You Are" and "Nights in White Satin", as performed on The X Factor.
- "Run for Your Life" was released as the album's official lead single on 10 October 2011. Written by Gary Barlow, it became Cardle's second consecutive top ten single when it peaked at number six on the UK Singles Chart on the week of release. The single contained two previously unreleased tracks, "Lost and Found" and "Chemical", as its B-sides.
- "Starlight" was released as the album's second official single on 4 December 2011. The single performed very poorly compared to Cardle's previous singles, only peaking at number 185 on the UK Singles Chart.
- "Amazing" was released as the album's third official single on 19 February 2012 and peaked at number 84 on the UK Singles chart. The single was released as an EP with an all-new song called "All Is Said", written by Cardle, James Walsh and Eliot James, a newly recorded studio version of "The First Time Ever I Saw Your Face", and a live version of "Slowly" recorded at KOKO in October 2011.

== Track listing ==
Standard edition
No.	Title	Writer(s)	Producer(s)	Length
1.	"Starlight"	Matt Cardle, Ash Howes, Richard Stannard, Seton Daunt	Stannard, Howes	4:18
2.	"Run for Your Life"	Gary Barlow	Barlow, Stannard, Howes	4:04
3.	"All for Nothing"	Cardle, Francis White	White, Jeremy Wheatley^{[a]}	3:23
4.	"Pull Me Under"	Cardle, James Walsh, Eliot James	Walsh, James	3:40
5.	"Amazing"	Cardle, Tom Leonard, Martin Harrington, Howes, Stannard	Stannard, Howes	3:59
6.	"Faithless"	Cardle, Walsh, James	Walsh, James	3:49
7.	"Beat of a Breaking Heart"	Cardle, Howes, Stannard, Daunt	Stannard, Howes	3:51
8.	"Stars & Lovers"	Cardle, Phil Thornalley, Jon Green	Phil Thornalley, Jon Green, Stannard^{[a]}	3:39
9.	"Letters"	Cardle, Howes, Stannard, David Sneddon, James Bauer-Mein	Stannard, Howes	4:26
10.	"Reflections"	Cardle, Walsh, James	Walsh, James	3:36
11.	"Walking on Water"	Cardle, Adam Argyle, Iain James, Michael Paynter	Stannard, Howes	2:54
12.	"Slowly"	Cardle, White, Sneddon	White	3:29
13.	"When We Collide"	Simon Neil	Stannard, Howes	3:48
Total length:				48:56

Amazon.co.uk free pre-release single^{[b]}
No.	Title	Writer(s)	Length
14.	"Sparks"	Cardle, Emma Rohan, Stannard, Howes, Daunt	4:09

Deluxe edition bonus disc
No.	Title	Writer(s)	Length
1.	"For You" (Acoustic Version)	Cardle, Howes, Sneddon, Bauer-Mein	3:55
2.	"Letters" (Acoustic Version)	Cardle, Howes, Stannard, Sneddon, Bauer-Mein	4:31
3.	"Amazing" (Acoustic Version)	Cardle, Howes, Stannard, Harrington, Leonard	4:02
4.	"Slowly" (Acoustic Version)	Cardle, White, Sneddon	3:37
5.	"Walking On Water" (Acoustic Version)	Cardle, Argyle, James, Paynter	3:19

Special pre-order edition bonus disc
No.	Title	Writer(s)	Length
1.	"Goodbye Yellow Brick Road" (Live on The X Factor)	Elton John, Bernie Taupin	2:09
2.	"...Baby One More Time" (Live on The X Factor)	Max Martin	2:22
3.	"Bleeding Love" (Live on The X Factor)	Jesse McCartney, Ryan Tedder	2:32
4.	"When Love Takes Over" (Live on The X Factor)	Miriam Nervo, Olivia Nervo, David Guetta, Frédéric Riesterer	2:14
5.	"She's Always A Woman" (Live on The X Factor)	Billy Joel	2:40

Notes

- ^{^a} signifies an additional record producer
- ^{^b} Offered as a free download to customers who purchased Letters before 15 October 2011.

== Charts and certifications ==
=== Weekly charts ===
Chart (2011)	Peak position
Irish Albums (IRMA)	2
Scottish Albums (Official Charts)	2
UK Albums (Official Charts)	2
UK Album Downloads (Official Charts)	2

=== Year-end charts ===
Chart (2011)	Position
UK Albums (OCC)	49

=== Certifications ===
Region	Certification	Certified units/sales
United Kingdom (BPI)	Gold	278,227

== Release history ==
Region	Date	Format	Label
Ireland	14 October 2011	Digital download, CD	Syco, Sony, Columbia
United Kingdom	17 October 2011	Digital download, CD	Syco, Sony, Columbia
Various	14 April 2023	Vinyl	Syco, Sony, Columbia
