= The Fire (Matt Cardle album) =

Studio album by Matt Cardle
- Released: 26 October 2012
- Recorded: 2012
- Genre: Pop rock
- Length: 34:15 (Standard); 48:56 (Deluxe)
- Label: SO What?
- Producer: Steve Booker, Matt Cardle (also exec.), Reynold D'Silva (exec.), Tim Gordine, Jeff Halatrax, Jamie Hartman, Will Talbot (exec.)

Matt Cardle chronology
Letters (2011)	The Fire (2012)	Porcelain (2013)

Singles from The Fire
- 1. "It's Only Love" Released: 29 October 2012; 2. "Anyone Else" Released: 31 December 2012

The Fire is the second studio album released by English musician Matt Cardle. The album was released on 26 October 2012, via SO What? Recordings, a subsidiary of Silva Screen Records, alongside the lead single, "It's Only Love". The Fire was primarily written by Cardle, but also writing credits from by Eg White, Jack McManus, Jamie Hartman, James Walsh and others. The album produced a second single, "Anyone Else", released on 31 December 2012. Cardle also made a video for the song "Lately", although not released as a single.

The album received wide positive response from critics, who complimented Cardle's voice, songwriting and harder sound. It was also a commercial success, debuting at number eight on both the British and Scottish album charts. It has sold over 60,000 copies in the UK giving it a Silver certification.

== Background ==
On 20 May 2012, Cardle announced on Twitter that he had "parted ways" with Columbia Records and Syco Music, stating musical differences as the reason for the departure. On 9 September 2012, Cardle announced that he had signed with So What Recordings, part of the Silva Screen Music Group. The same day, he announced that his second album, The Fire, would be released on 29 October 2012. The lead single from the album, "It's Only Love," was also confirmed for release on 29 October 2012. He has stated that he had offers from various record labels but decided to go with the independent over a major one to have more control: "The other major labels that were interested, they were offering a similar thing to Sony, and I really wanted to have as much control as I could. So (So What Recordings) offered just as much support in every other way that a major label would, but I get to have control, which I plan to keep."

Cardle is credited with producing the album, and co-writing nine of the record's ten tracks, alongside Starsailor frontman James Walsh, Eg White, whose previous credits include Adele and Will Young, and Paul Statham, who has written for Dido and Kylie Minogue. Cardle also played the majority of the instruments on the album. He has stated that having complete freedom on the album was important to him, and so he had to be a bit of a "control freak". As well as the standard 10 track edition, a deluxe edition was made available, with three extra original tracks and an acoustic version of "It's Only Love".

Lyrically, the album is predominantly about the break up of Cardle's relationship with dancer Sarah Robinson, who he met during his time on The X Factor. According to Cardle, the only track on the album (apart from the one he did not write, "The First Time Ever I Saw Your Face") that is not about his relationship breakup is "Water," which is about the death of his uncle Richard.

== Reception ==
Professional ratings
Review scores
Source	Rating
Daily Mirror	(Positive)
Music-News	4/5 stars
Female First	2.5/5 stars
LSMedia	4/5 stars
Entertainment Focus	4/5 stars
What Culture	5/5 stars

The Fire has received mostly positive feedback. The Mirror described it as "a more heartfelt and mature sound". Entertainment Focus gave it four out of five stars, stating that "Cardle has come back fighting and we think he's definitely won." LSMedia also gave the album four out of five stars, describing it as "energetic yet emotional" and "full of growth". Unreality Shout declared the album "Highly Recommended". Music News gave it four out of five stars, calling it "a triumphant, yet emotional album". What Culture gave the album five out of five, calling it "a fantastic demonstration of how good Matt can sing" and "a wonderful album from beginning to end".

"The Fire" debuted at number eight on both the British and Scottish album charts, making it Cardle's second top ten release on both charts. It also debuted at number 1 on the OCC Independent Chart. The album was similarly successful in Ireland, where it debuted at number fourteen on the chart, and number one on the indie chart. Four editions of the album were made available, each with an alternate code number. SW001 is the standard physical or digital version of the album, with ten tracks. SW002 is the digital, and Tesco physical exclusive, deluxe edition, with fourteen tracks. SW003 are signed copies of the standard ten-track album, which were made available via HMV. The HMV edition also includes extended liner notes from Cardle.

== Singles ==
- "It's Only Love" was released as the lead single from the album on 29 October 2012. The video for the track premiered on 10 October, and was filmed in Palmdale, California. The single charted at number 175 on the UK Singles Chart, after receiving little promotion and very little airplay on mainstream radio.
- "Anyone Else" was the second single from the album. This was confirmed by Cardle via his official Twitter account on 30 October 2012. It has been reworked slightly for the video and radio with extra backing vocals added in on the last chorus. It was given a release date of 31 December 2012 although it wasn't re-released as a single separate from the album.

== Track listing ==
No.	Title	Writer(s)	Producer(s)	Length
1.	"It's Only Love"	Matt Cardle, Paul Statham	Cardle	3:13
2.	"The Fire"	Cardle, Francis White, Jack McManus	Cardle	3:36
3.	"For Every Heartbreak"	Cardle, Steve Booker	Booker, Cardle	3:43
4.	"Water"	Cardle, Andrew Jackson, Tim Gordine	Gordine, Cardle	3:38
5.	"Anywhere"	Cardle, Ben Earle	Cardle	3:29
6.	"Anyone Else"	Cardle, Jeff Halatrax	Cardle	3:04
7.	"Empire"	Cardle, Jamie Hartman	Cardle, Hartman	3:27
8.	"All That Matters"	Cardle	Cardle	2:55
9.	"Lately"	Cardle, James Walsh	Cardle	5:21
10.	"The First Time Ever I Saw Your Face"	Ewan MacColl	Cardle	3:49

Deluxe version bonus tracks
No.	Title	Writer(s)	Producer(s)	Length
11.	"It's Only Love" (acoustic)	Cardle, Statham	Cardle	3:30
12.	"Millionaire"	Cardle, David Bassett	Cardle	4:00
13.	"Hanging from Your Heartstrings"	Cardle, Earle		4:04
14.	"Your Somebody"	Cardle, Thomas "Tawgs" Salter	Cardle	3:25

== Charts ==
Chart (2012)	Peak position
Irish Albums Chart	14
Irish Independent Albums Chart	1
Scottish Albums Chart	8
UK Albums Chart	8
UK Indie Chart	1

== Release history ==
Regions	Dates	Format(s)	Label(s)
Ireland	26 October 2012	CD, digital download	SO What? Recordings
United Kingdom	29 October 2012	CD, digital download	SO What? Recordings
