= Loving You (Matt Cardle and Melanie C song) =

2013 song by Matt Cardle and Melanie C

Single by Matt Cardle and Melanie C

from the album Porcelain
- Released: 18 August 2013
- Recorded: 2012
- Genre: Pop rock
- Length: 3:34
- Songwriter(s): Matt Cardle; Melanie C; Jez Ashurst; Will Talbot; Jamie Scott
- Producer(s): Matt Cardle; Jamie Scott; Toby Smith

Matt Cardle singles chronology
"Anyone Else" (2012)	"Loving You" (2013)	"When You Were My Girl" (2013)

Melanie C singles chronology
"I Know Him So Well" (2012)	"Loving You" (2013)	"Cool As You" (2014)

Music video
- "Loving You" on YouTube

"Loving You" is a song by English singers Matt Cardle and Melanie C. It was written by Cardle, Jez Ashurst, Will Talbot, Jamie Scott and Melanie C, and was produced by Cardle, Scott and Toby Smith. It features Cardle on drums and acoustic guitar. The single was released on 18 August 2013 in the United Kingdom as a digital download as the lead single from his third studio album Porcelain (2013). It has also been released in many countries worldwide, making it the first of his singles to be released outside the United Kingdom and Ireland. Despite only BBC Radio 2 playlisting the song, which meant a lack of airplay on radio overall, it performed well in the charts.

It reached number 14 on the UK Singles Chart, making it Cardle's third and Melanie C's twelfth (as a solo artist) UK Top 40 single. It also reached number 42 on the Irish Singles Chart and number 11 in Scotland.

== Background ==
Rumours of a duet between Cardle and Melanie C began in early May 2013 after she attended his concert at Union Chapel on 2 May. It was confirmed on 30 June on his website, when it was announced as the first single from his forthcoming album. Cardle said, "I met Melanie at the Isle of Wight Festival last year. I’m a big fan and I’ve always loved her voice." Speaking of the song he said, "I had already started writing "Loving You", and I thought with a few changes it could work perfectly as a duet".

The song premiered on The Ken Bruce Show on BBC Radio 2 on 2 July 2013. A lyric video was uploaded on YouTube on the same day. On 25 July a Spanish version of the song, titled "Te Amo", was released on YouTube and made available to pre-order on iTunes.

== Music video ==
Melanie and Cardle sharing a kiss in a music video scene

Directed by Jonny Kight, the music video was filmed in south London, England on 4 July 2013. It premiered on YouTube on 21 July 2013. The video starts with Cardle sitting on his own in various rooms of a house. Mel C is revealed, also on her own, after the first chorus for her solo verse. Throughout, there are close up shots of their bodies laying together on a mattress, apart at first then becoming closer together until finally kissing at the end.

== Promotion ==
On 6 July 2013, Cardle performed the song for the first time, as a solo in Stafford. On 16 August 2013 he performed the song with Melanie C live on British weekday breakfast television programme Daybreak. On 21 August 2013 they performed the song live on British daytime television programme This Morning.

Cardle and Melanie C went on a promotional trip to Germany in late August. They performed on German sports show Samstag Live on 24 August 2013. On 25 August 2013 they performed the song on German television programme Fernsehgarten. In October they did a promotional trip to Poland. They performed on Polish TV show Dzień Dobry TVN on 26 October 2013. They also performed on British chat show The Paul O'Grady Show on 15 November 2013.

== Formats and track listings ==
These are the formats and track listings of major single releases of "Loving You".

- Digital download
1. "Loving You" – 3:34
- Digital download
1. "Te Amo" – 3:34
- Remixes (EP)
1. Loving You (DSK CHK Radio Edit) - 3:52
2. Loving You (DSK CHK Remix) - 6:45
3. Loving You (Ravi B. Remix) - 4:48
4. Loving You (Funk Generation H3DRush Radio Mix) - 3:55
5. Loving You (Funk Generation H3DRush Club Mix) - 6:32

== Charts ==
Chart (2013)	Peak position
Ireland (IRMA)	42
Scotland (OCC)	11
UK Indie (OCC)	2
UK Singles (OCC)	14

== Release history ==
Country	Date	Format
Ireland	16 August 2013	Digital download
United Kingdom	18 August 2013	Digital download
Brazil	18 August 2013	Digital download
United States	20 August 2013	Digital download
Canada	20 August 2013	Digital download
Germany	23 August 2013	Digital download
Czech Republic	23 August 2013	Digital download
Australia	9 May 2014	Digital download
