= Amazing (Matt Cardle song) =

Single by Matt Cardle

from the album Letters
- Released: 19 February 2012
- Recorded: 2010–2011
- Genre: Indie pop
- Length: 3:59
- Label: Syco Music, Columbia
- Songwriter(s): Matt Cardle; Martin Harrington; Tom Leonard; Ash Howes; Richard Stannard
- Producer(s): Richard 'Biff' Stannard

Matt Cardle singles chronology
"Starlight" (2011)	"Amazing" (2012)	"It's Only Love" (2012)

"Amazing" is a song by British singer-songwriter Matt Cardle, released as the third single from his debut studio album, Letters, on 19 February 2012. The song was co-written by Tom Leonard, Martin Harrington, Ash Howes, Richard Stannard and Cardle himself. The single was backed with an all-new track, "All Is Said", as well as a live version of "Slowly", and a studio version of his cover of "The First Time Ever I Saw Your Face".

== Critical reception ==
Robert Copsey of Digital Spy gave the song a positive review, stating: "Co-written by the man himself and produced by Richard Stannard – Ellie Goulding, Will Young – 'Amazing' will do little to deter his detractors who claim he is nothing more than mushy MOR guitar-pop, but it should easily please his larger-than-you'd-think fanbase. Yes, it's another Keane-esque guitar-strumming number, the lyrics are clichéd – "Look inside this fragile heart of mine" – and he belts out his trademark ad-libs at the end, but – whisper it – sometimes you just can't beat a bit of no-frills pop.".

== Lawsuit ==
On 9 June 2016, it was reported that Ed Sheeran and Johnny McDaid, were being sued by "Amazing" songwriters Harrington and Leonard, for $20 million for copyright infringement with their song "Photograph". The lawsuit says: "Given the striking similarity between the chorus of Amazing and Photograph, (the) defendants knew when writing, publishing, recording, releasing, and distributing Photograph that they were infringing on a pre-existing musical composition." Cardle clarified on Twitter that it was not his lawsuit, adding that he thinks Ed Sheeran is "a genius and 100% deserves all his success". The lawsuit was privately settled in April 2017, with no admission of guilt and an undisclosed sum.

== Music video ==
The music video for "Amazing" premiered on 13 January 2012, at a total length of four minutes and six-seconds. The video shows scenes of Cardle performing the song in a dark room, direct to camera. Certain shots are filmed in a laissez-faire style, with the camera and boom operators being seen in shot. It also shows scenes of people in the surrounding studio in various states of emotion, as well as various monochromatic scenes of Cardle talking to the cast and crew. The video features former Hollyoaks and Eastenders actress, Modupe Adeyeye.

== Track listing ==
Digital EP
No.	Title	Writer(s)	Length
1.	"Amazing"	Matt Cardle, Tom Leonard, Martin Harrington, Ash Howes, Richard Stannard	3:58
2.	"The First Time Ever I Saw Your Face" (Studio Mix)	Ewan MacColl	3:36
3.	"All Is Said" (Demo)	Matt Cardle, James Walsh, Eliot James	3:54
4.	"Slowly" (Live from Koko)	Matt Cardle, Eg White, David Sneddon	4:00

Promotional CD single
No.	Title	Writer(s)	Length
1.	"Amazing"	Matt Cardle, Tom Leonard, Martin Harrington, Ash Howes, Richard Stannard	3:31
2.	"Amazing" (Instrumental)	Matt Cardle, Tom Leonard, Martin Harrington, Ash Howes, Richard Stannard	3:31

== Chart performance ==
Chart (2011)	Peak position
UK Singles (The Official Charts Company)	84
