= It's Only Love (Matt Cardle song) =

Single by Matt Cardle

from the album The Fire
- Released: 29 October 2012
- Recorded: 2012
- Genre: Indie Pop
- Length: 3:13
- Label: So What Recordings
- Songwriter(s): Matt Cardle, Paul Statham
- Producer(s): Matt Cardle

Matt Cardle singles chronology
"Amazing" (2012)	"It's Only Love" (2012)	"Anyone Else" (2012)

"It's Only Love" is a song by British singer-songwriter Matt Cardle, released as the lead single from his second studio album, The Fire, on 29 October 2012. It was written by Matt Cardle and Paul Statham and produced by Matt Cardle. The song peaked at number 175 on the UK Singles Chart.

== Background ==
Discussing the song, Cardle said: "When I started writing the track with Paul, we immediately started to feel a bit of an '80s vibe, so we just ran with it! Big vocals, big drums… it was great fun to write." Explaining the lyrical content, Cardle says the song is about not leaning too heavily on the ideals of romance, "I fell in love and it didn't quite work out and how I was feeling at the time that's how I was putting it across in the song, that sometimes it's not the be all and end all."

A music video to accompany the release of "It's Only Love" was first released onto YouTube on 3 October 2012, at a total length of three minutes and ten seconds. The video was filmed in Palmdale, California. It features Cardle walking along a long stretch of road, being followed by people who have just been dumped by their partners. Cardle came up with the concept on his way home from a gig, drawing some inspiration from one of his favourite films, Forrest Gump, for the scene involving a group of people walking down an empty highway.

== Promotion ==
Cardle performed the song acoustically on various radio shows ahead of the album release and on STV. He performed it with a live band on This Morning on 29 October 2012.

== Tracklist ==
The Remixes – EP

1. "It's Only Love" (Radio Edit) -3:11
2. "It's Only Love" (7th Heaven Radio Edit) – 3:46
3. "It's Only Love" (7th Heaven Club Mix) – 7:49
4. "It's Only Love" (Super Stylers Remix) – 6:45

== Chart performance ==
The song peaked at number 175 on the UK Singles Chart, due to little promotion and very little radio airplay.

=== Weekly charts ===
Chart (2012)	Peak position
UK Singles (The Official Charts Company)	175

== Release history ==
Country	Release date	Format	Label
United Kingdom	29 October 2012	Digital download	So What Recordings
