= Run for Your Life (Matt Cardle song) =

2011 single by Matt Cardle

Single by Matt Cardle

from the album Letters
- Released: 9 October 2011
- Recorded: 2010–2011
- Genre: Indie pop
- Length: 3:43 (video/radio edit); 4:08 (album version)
- Label: Syco Music
- Songwriter(s): Gary Barlow
- Producer(s): Gary Barlow

Matt Cardle singles chronology
| "When We Collide" (2010) | "Run for Your Life" (2011) | "Starlight" (2011) |

"Run for Your Life" is a song by the British singer-songwriter and The X Factor 2010 winner Matt Cardle. It was released on 9 October 2011 as the lead single from his first studio album, Letters (2011). The song was written and produced by Gary Barlow, and was the last song that Cardle recorded for the album. It reached number 6 on the UK Singles Chart.

== Background ==
"Run for Your Life" was written by the Take That frontman Gary Barlow after he took over the role of head judge on The X Factor in 2011, of which Cardle won the seventh series.

On 19 August 2011, a 30-second snippet was posted by Cardle on his Facebook page. On 5 September 2011, the song received its first radio airplay by Chris Moyles on BBC Radio 1. The video for the song was premiered on the same day on Cardle's YouTube channel. The song was officially released via digital download on 9 October 2011, with a CD single release following the next day.

== Critical reception ==
"Run for Your Life" was met with generally negative reviews. Robert Copsey of Digital Spy rated it 3/5, stating: "X Factor winners of the male variety have never had it easy. Steve Brookstein and Leon Jackson barely made it past a second single, while Shayne Ward and Joe McElderry were more recently banished from the Syco clique after failing to match the bar set by X Factor female winners Leona and Alexandra. Fortunately for Matt Cardle, his anti-talent show image during last year's competition gave him a more promising outlook – but is it enough to buck the boys' worrying trend? Judging by 'Run For Your Life', it looks like he's finally succumbed to the peer pressure. Over an anaemic guitar-pop melody, he confesses he's not worthy of his kindly lass, admitting: 'You need someone to walk you back/ Someone to love you too before you ask – before launching into the arm-waving, Gary Barlow-penned chorus. While Matt's famous falsetto manages a brief appearance, it's about the only distinguishable feature that remains from his once-rebellious nature." Copsey also called the single a "disappointing start".

The BBC described the single as "plodding" and "try-hard", while The Guardian said it "sounds like a song Barlow was happy for Take That to pass up." Pop Ledge said it "was probably a Take That D-side cast off – not much to get excited about." WhatCulture gave "Run for Your Life" a positive review, commenting that it "shows off Cardle’s stunning vocal range".

== Music video ==
The music video was directed by Tom Watson, and was premiered on 5 September 2011 on Cardle's YouTube channel. The video shows Cardle performing in front of a video screen, watching images of a woman running along a beach, staring back at him. The video ends when the woman jumps out of the screen, hugs Cardle, and the pair walk off into the distance.

== Live performances ==
Cardle performed the song live for the first time on 9 October 2011 during the live results show of The X Factor, in front of the song's writer, Gary Barlow. On 13 October 2011, he recorded a performance for The Album Chart Show along with a few other tracks from the album. On 19 November 2011, he performed the song live on Children In Need. For each performance Cardle had a live backing band.

== Track listing ==
- Digital download / CD single
1. "Run for Your Life" – 4:08
2. "Lost & Found" (Richard Lobb) – 4:13
3. "Chemical" (Cardle, Stannard, Howes, Sneddon, Bauer-Mein) – 3:12

== Charts ==
| Chart (2011) | Peak position |
|---|---|
| Ireland (IRMA) | 12 |
| Scotland (OCC) | 6 |
| UK Singles (OCC) | 6 |
| UK Download (The Official Charts Company) | 7 |

== Release history ==
| Region | Date | Format | Label |
|---|---|---|---|
| Ireland | 7 October 2011 | Digital download | Syco Music / Columbia Records |
| United Kingdom | 9 October 2011 | Digital download | Syco Music / Columbia Records |
| United Kingdom | 10 October 2011 | CD single | Syco Music / Columbia Records |
