= Starlight (Matt Cardle song) =

Single by Matt Cardle

from the album Letters
- Released: 4 December 2011
- Recorded: 2010–2011
- Genre: Indie Pop
- Length: 4:18
- Label: Syco Music
- Songwriter(s): Matt Cardle, Ash Howes, Richard Stannard, Seton Daunt
- Producer(s): Richard 'Biff' Stannard

Matt Cardle singles chronology
"Run for Your Life" (2011)	"Starlight" (2011)	"Amazing" (2012)

"Starlight" is a song by British singer-songwriter Matt Cardle. It was written by Matt Cardle, Ash Howes, Richard Stannard and Seton Daunt. It was released in the UK as the second single from his debut studio album, Letters on 4 December 2011.

== Background ==
The song was co-written between Matt Cardle, Ash Howes, producer Richard Stannard and mixer Seton Daunt. It was one of the first songs that Cardle wrote for the album. Despite expressing his wishes at releasing "Starlight" as the album's single, its release was postponed in favour of "Run for Your Life". The single eventually received an official release on 4 December 2011. The only digital format of the single, a two-track remix bundle, managed to peak at number 2 on the UK Club Singles Chart, however the official single only entered the UK Singles Chart at number 185. The single failed to chart on the Irish Singles Chart.

== Critical reception ==
Lewis Corner of Digital Spy gave the song a positive review stating: "Luckily for Cardle, it's infinitely better than his Take That reject last effort. "It wouldn't matter if we died tonight/ We are beautiful," he proclaims over a rousing combo of weighty beats and soaring guitar riffs breezier than the top of the Blackpool tower, before unleashing his impressive vocal talents on the chorus. The result is easily his strongest offering to date, so fingers crossed it's not all in vain." The Mirror was also favourable, saying "Like a phoenix from the ashes, perhaps it’s not quite over yet for Matt Cardle.". Unreality Shout said "There’s an pleasant enough production at work here, with meaty guitars backed up by a thumping piano chime, and there’s an almost tangible sense of optimistic anticipation for the chorus. When the chorus arrives, the tightly rounded verse structure is thrown up into the air with the arrival of raucous guitars and a soaring vocal from Cardle, but he takes his time getting the stride right."

== Music video ==
A music video to accompany the release of "Starlight" was first released onto YouTube on 2 November 2011, at a total length of three minutes and forty-eight seconds. The video features Cardle and an entourage of fans performing the song in and around a disused cargo port. The final scene shows the entire cast of the video gathered around Cardle, whilst an array of Fireworks are let off in the distance.

== Live performances and other media usage ==
Cardle performed "Starlight" on T4 Stars Live on 9 December 2011 and again for the Hollyoaks Christmas special. In Ireland he performed the song on The Late Late Show on 4 November 2011 with a different band than he normally plays with. The song appeared in the soundtrack for 2012 movie Fast Girls. It was also used in the trailer for 2012 movie Best Exotic Marigold Hotel.

== Track listing ==
- Digital download
1. "Starlight" – 4:18
2. "Starlight" (Music Video) – 3:41
- Digital download – Remix single
1. "Starlight" (The Alias Remix Edit) – 3:50
2. "Starlight" (The Alias Club Remix) – 6:10
- CD single
1. "Starlight" (Radio Edit) – 3:41
2. "Starlight" (Instrumental Version) – 4:18

== Chart performance ==
Chart (2011	Peak position
UK Singles (The Official Charts Company)	185

== Release history ==
Region	Date	Format	Label
United Kingdom	4 December 2011	Digital download, CD single	Syco Music
