= Matt Cardle =

English singer (born 1983)

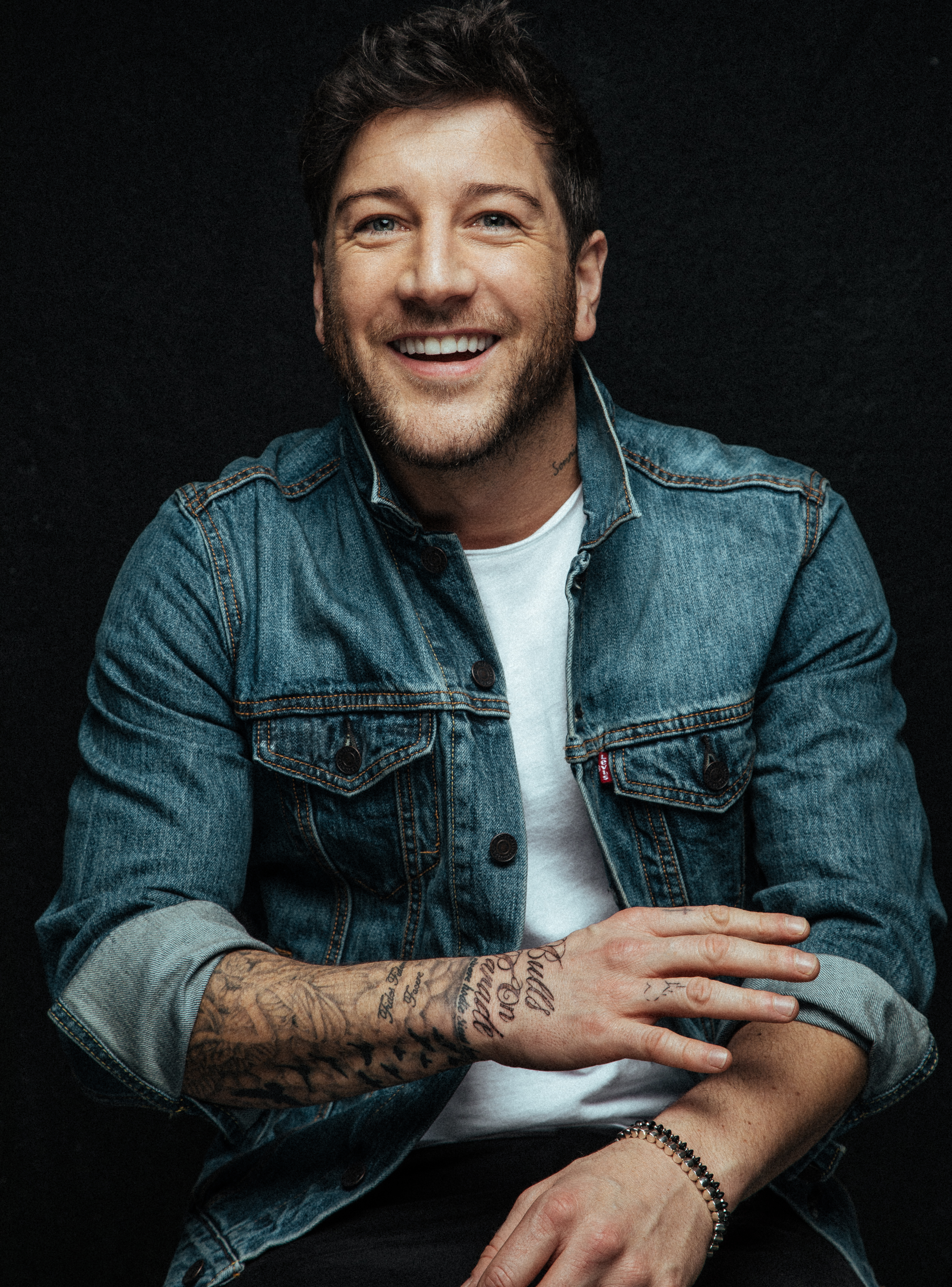
- Cardle in 2011

Background information
- Born: Matthew Sheridan Cardle; 15 April 1983 (age 43); Southampton, Hampshire, England
- Origin: Halstead, Essex, England
- Genres: Indie pop; pop rock; pop
- Occupations: Singer; songwriter
- Instruments: Vocals; guitar
- Years active: 2005–present
- Labels: Syco; Columbia; So What; Absolute; Universal
- Website: mattcardlemusic.com

Matthew Sheridan Cardle (born 15 April 1983) is an English singer. He was born in Southampton and grew up in Halstead, Essex. Cardle has been involved in music since his early teens and has been a member of two different bands; Darwyn and Seven Summers. Cardle rose to fame after winning the seventh series of The X Factor in 2010, and received a £1 million recording contract with Syco Music and later signed a deal with Columbia Records.

Following Cardle's victory on The X Factor, the winner's single and his debut single, "When We Collide", was released. The track was made available to purchase on 12 December 2010, shortly after the show had ended. On 19 December 2010, the track debuted at number one on the UK singles chart, as well as on the Irish Singles Chart. The track also became the second biggest-selling single of 2010 with 815,000 copies sold within two weeks. In June 2012, it had sold one million copies, the fourth single by an X Factor contestant to have done so.

"Run for Your Life" was the follow-up single released by Cardle which charted at number six on the UK singles chart. Cardle went on to release his debut album, Letters, in 2011, which debuted at number two on the UK Albums Chart and the Irish Albums Chart. The album saw two more singles released, "Starlight" and "Amazing". Cardle then parted ways with record labels Syco Music and Columbia Records, and signed a recording contract with So What Recordings in early 2012. He released his second studio album, The Fire, which charted at number eight on the UK Albums Chart. In October 2013, Cardle released his third album, Porcelain, in association with Absolute Marketing as an independent release; the album reached number 11 on the UK Albums Chart, and included the duet with Melanie C, "Loving You", which reached number 14 on the UK singles chart. His fourth studio album, Time to Be Alive was released in 2018. Cardle's fifth studio album, The Great Escape was released in July 2026, and was preceded by the single "Drinking Dreams", released November 2025.

Cardle is a guitarist, and plays frequently on tour and other performances. He also plays other instruments including drums and piano. He has toured the United Kingdom, South Africa, Asia and Ireland on his Letters Tour in 2012, Unplugged Tour in 2013, Porcelain Tour in 2014 and Intimate and Live Tour in 2016. As of 2025, Cardle has sold in excess of three million records.

== Life and career ==
=== Early life and career beginnings ===
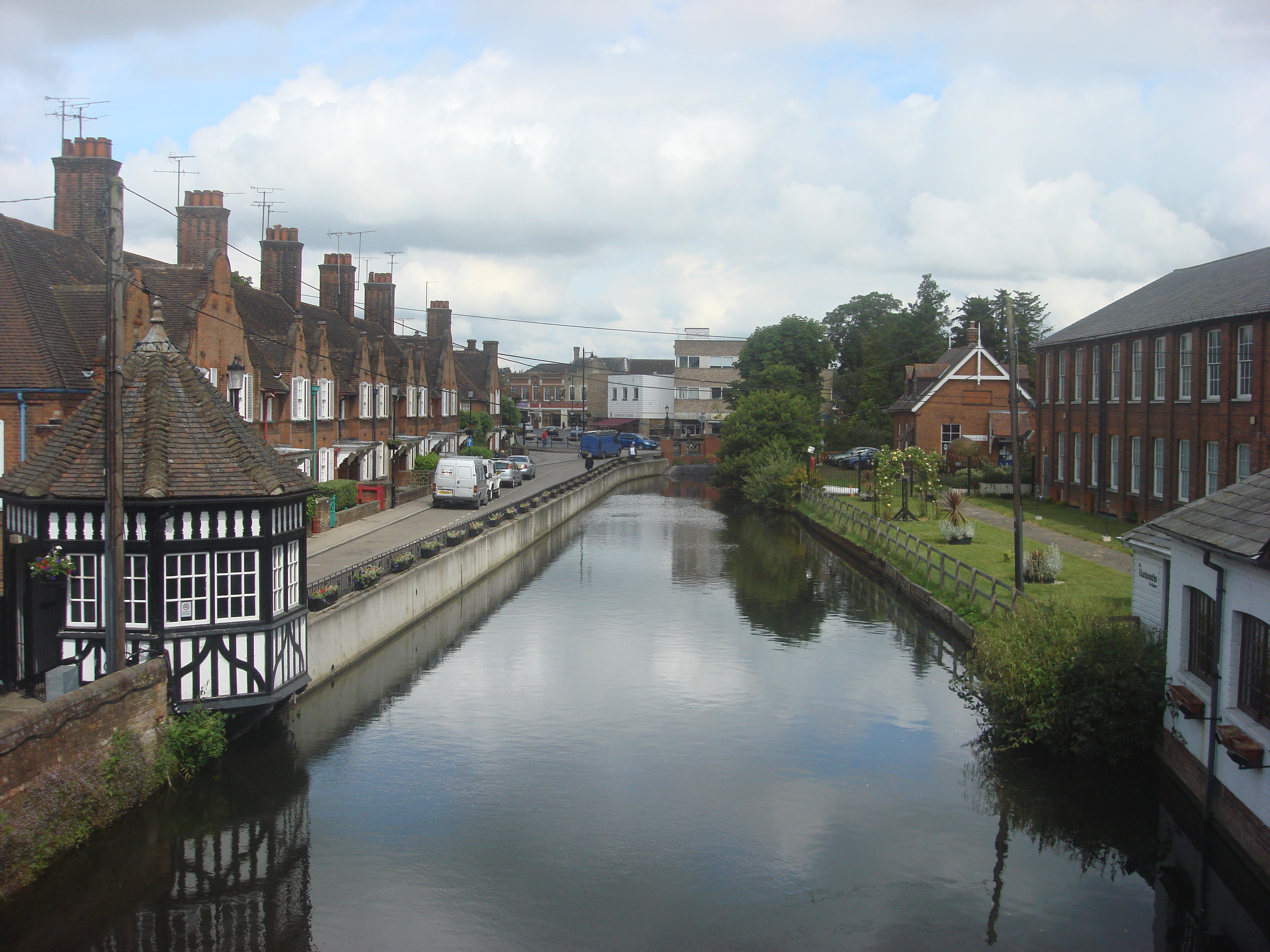
Cardle was raised in Halstead, Essex.

Matthew Sheridan Cardle was born on 15 April 1983 in Southampton, Hampshire, to David and Jennifer Cardle (née Horner). He has an older brother called Dominic with whom he has a close relationship. His family lived in Bristol before moving to Essex. He started playing guitar and writing songs at aged 11 and knew from that point that music was what he wanted to do with his life. At this time he also started singing lessons but stopped going after missing a class. He attended a summer band camp through his teens and played in bands. He attended the independent Stoke College in Suffolk, then studied a music course at the Institute in Colchester. He then went on to do a media course at Braintree College. Cardle is a keen skateboarder and spent a lot of his college years at skate parks instead of studying and therefore felt that education wasn't the right path for him. When he was a young adult, he interviewed for a music course at Bournemouth University but he didn't make it. He said he was "probably rubbish at the time."

In 2005, Cardle joined alternative rock/pop band Darwyn and the band recorded an 11-track album, When You Wake, the band also released a follow-up EP, Little Sunlight in 2006. The band described themselves as an acoustic rock band. The band's first album contained tracks "Violet" and title track "When You Wake". They were awarded an Arts Council England grant which they used to record the EP Little Sunlight. The band played at many festivals including Stortford Music Festival and Brownstock Festival and regularly played at the venue and recording studio Highbarn in Essex. Cardle and Darwyn band member Ali McMillan also played as a two-piece under the name Darwyn, playing acoustic cover versions of popular songs in venues in and around the Suffolk area and videos of them playing together have gained many views on YouTube.

In 2009, Cardle became the lead singer and guitarist of rock band called Seven Summers. The band performed live on Sue Marchant's BBC radio program, in December 2009. They released their self-titled album in January 2010. The album featured alternative rock, pop, urban and folk influences. The album included the songs "Youngblood", "Way to Be" and "Dirt" and the follow-up single "Picture of You". Although the band did not have a recording contract and they distributed their music independently, they reached No.30 on the Official UK Album Downloads Chart and No.11 on the Official UK Independent Album Charts for week ending 25 December 2010, and No.1 on the Official UK Independent Album Breakers Charts for week ending 25 December 2010. Following Cardle's success on The X Factor, the band saw an upsurge in popularity, with their music videos gaining large numbers of views on YouTube.

=== 2010: The X Factor ===
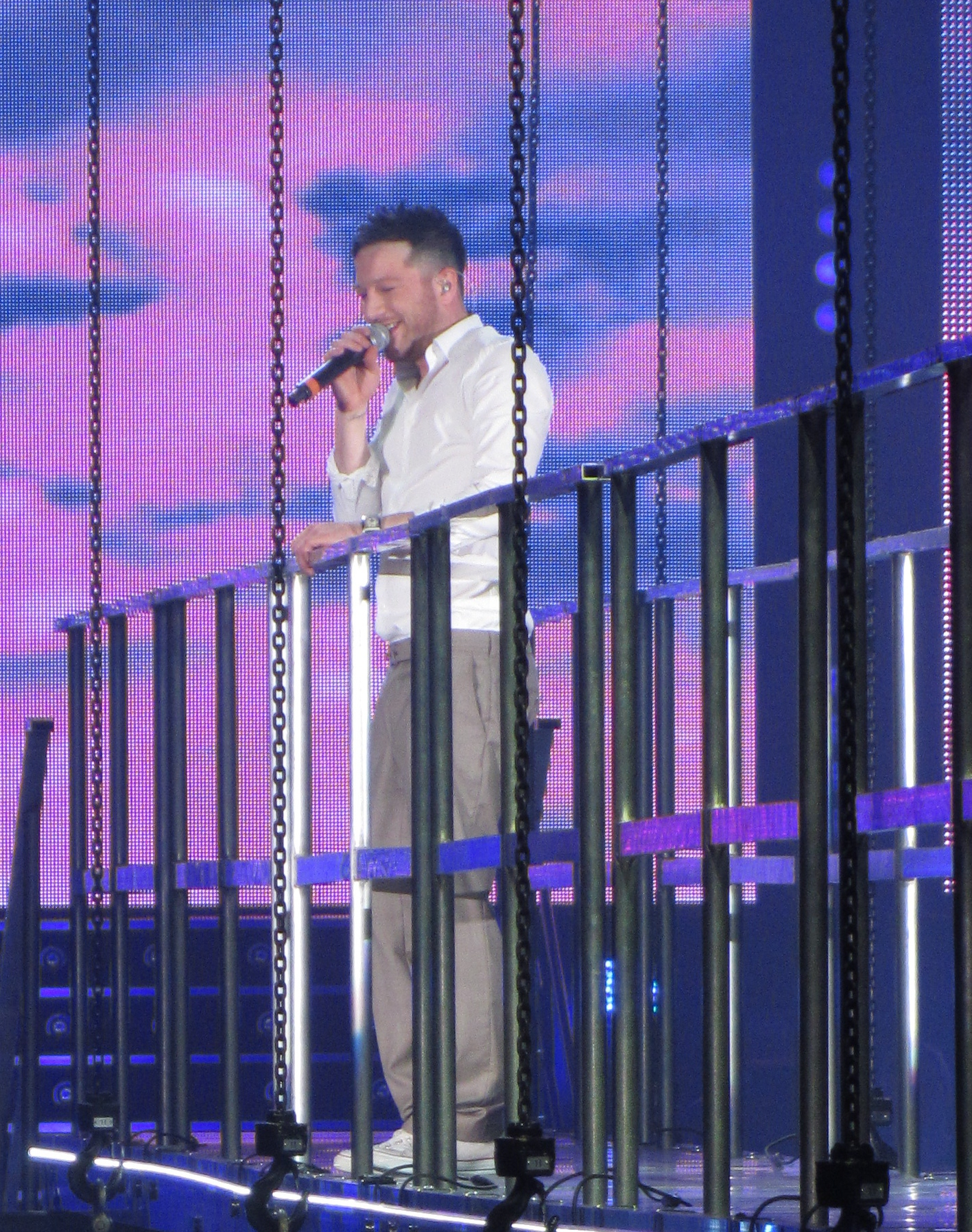
Cardle performing on the X Factor tour

In 2010, Cardle auditioned for the seventh series of The X Factor in front of Simon Cowell, Cheryl Cole and Louis Walsh, singing Amy Winehouse's "You Know I'm No Good". At the Bootcamp stage of the show, he sang "The First Time Ever I Saw Your Face", a performance which prompted Simon Cowell to say "Why haven't we noticed him before?" and Louis Walsh to say "He's the biggest surprise of today for me!" He was put through to the Boys category where the age limit was raised to 28, making Dannii Minogue his mentor. Cardle was favourite to win from before the live shows until the end of the series, with some of the shortest odds the show had ever seen.

On the first live show he sang "When Love Takes Over" which received high praise from all four judges. In week five he performed "The First Time Ever I Saw Your Face" again, which earned him the first standing ovation from all four judges of the series. It remains his most viewed performance on YouTube with over 34 million views to date. In the semi-final he had to withdraw from a secret X Factor gig in London due to throat problems which saw him almost have to miss the show that weekend. In the final he performed a duet with Rihanna.

Cardle was announced the winner on 12 December 2010, after receiving 44.61% of the vote. He received the most votes every week from week two, being beaten only by Mary Byrne in week one. The week after the series final, Cardle's cover version of "Many of Horror" originally recorded by Scottish rock trio Biffy Clyro and retitled as "When We Collide", topped the UK Singles Chart to become the 2010 Christmas number 1 and remained there for three consecutive weeks. The song was nominated in the Best British Single category at the 2011 BRIT Awards. In June 2012 the song reached the one million sale mark, making it the 123rd single to sell a million copies in the UK and the fourth by an X Factor contestant. In Ireland it is the fourth best selling single of all time, and the best selling single of the century so far, as of 31 December 2015.

Cardle remains good friends with fellow contestant Aiden Grimshaw and mentor Dannii Minogue. On 15 March 2011, it was reported that Cardle signed a record deal with Syco Music in a joint venture with Columbia Records, becoming the first The X Factor winner not to be exclusively signed to Simon Cowell's label.

Beyond singing on The X Factor, Cardle says he tries to watch the show in his spare time.

The X Factor performances and results
| Show | Song choice | Theme | Result |
|---|---|---|---|
| Audition | "You Know I'm No Good" – Amy Winehouse | —N/a | Through to bootcamp |
| Bootcamp (Part 1) | "Paparazzi" – Lady Gaga | —N/a | Through to the next day of bootcamp |
| Bootcamp (Part 2) | "The First Time Ever I Saw Your Face" – Roberta Flack | —N/a | Through to judges' houses |
| Judges' houses | "If I Were a Boy" – Beyoncé | —N/a | Through to live shows |
| Live show 1 | "When Love Takes Over" – David Guetta feat. Kelly Rowland | Number-one singles | Safe (2nd) |
| Live show 2 | "Just the Way You Are" – Bruno Mars | Heroes | Safe (1st) |
| Live show 3 | "...Baby One More Time" – Britney Spears | Guilty pleasures | Safe (1st) |
| Live show 4 | "Bleeding Love" – Leona Lewis | Halloween | Safe (1st) |
| Live show 5 | "The First Time Ever I Saw Your Face" – Roberta Flack | American anthems | Safe (1st) |
| Live show 6 | "Goodbye Yellow Brick Road" – Elton John | Elton John | Safe (1st) |
| Live show 7 | "Come Together" – The Beatles | The Beatles | Safe (1st) |
| Quarter-Final | "I Love Rock 'n' Roll" – Joan Jett and the Blackhearts | Rock | Safe (1st) |
| Quarter-Final | "Nights in White Satin" – The Moody Blues | Rock | Safe (1st) |
| Semi-Final | "You Got the Love" – Florence and the Machine | Club classics | Safe (1st) |
| Semi-Final | "She's Always a Woman" – Billy Joel | Song to get you to the final | Safe (1st) |
| Final (Part 1) | "Here with Me" – Dido | No theme | Safe (1st) |
| Final (Part 1) | "Unfaithful" – (with Rihanna) | Celebrity duet | Safe (1st) |
| Final (Part 2) | "Firework" – Katy Perry | No theme | Winner |
| Final (Part 2) | "When We Collide" – Biffy Clyro | Winners single | Winner |

=== 2011–2013: Letters and The Fire ===
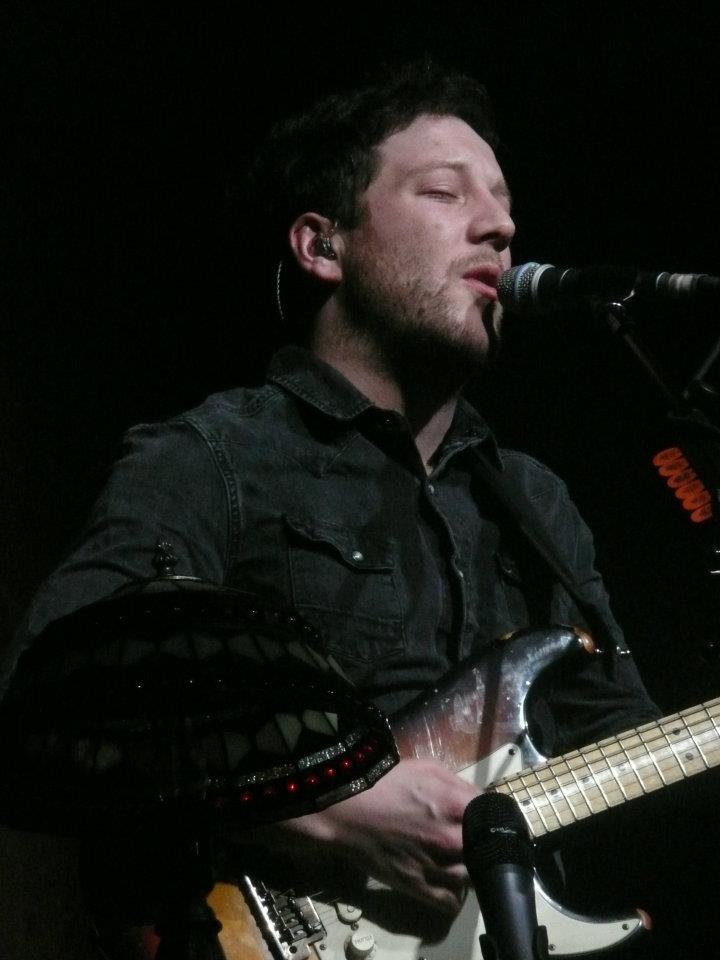
Cardle performing at Hammersmith Apollo, March 2012

On 18 August 2011, Cardle revealed that his debut album, Letters, would be released in the UK on 17 October 2011. Cardle said he was nervous about releasing his album as previous male X Factor winners have not been very successful, and female winners Leona Lewis and Alexandra Burke enjoyed massive success. Whilst working on the album Cardle collaborated with various writers including Eg White and James Walsh. The album's first single, "Run for Your Life," written by Gary Barlow, was premiered on The Chris Moyles Show on 5 September 2011. Cardle appeared on the BBC Breakfast show on 1 September to give a preview of the video. The video was then premiered in full on 5 September on his YouTube channel. The single was released on 9 October 2011, Cardle performed the song on The X Factor on the same day. He also performed another track from the album, "All For Nothing", on ITV2 show The Xtra Factor. "Run for Your Life" peaked at number six on the UK Top 40 Chart. Prior to the album release Cardle went on a five date tour ending on 3 October at Koko in London. Letters was released on 17 October and debuted at number two on the UK Albums chart and spent 16 consecutive weeks in the top 40.

A second single, "Starlight", was released on 4 December 2011. It had been originally intended as the first single before "Run for Your Life" was sent to him and was generally better received by fans and journalists. Despite this, it only charted at number 185 but sparked a boost in album sales which saw "Letters" return to the top 25 on the album charts shortly after "Starlight"s release. The third and final single to be released from "Letters" was Amazing which was released as an EP, containing a new track called "All Is Said", which Cardle wrote with James Walsh, a new recording of "First Time Ever I Saw Your Face" and a live version of the album track "Slowly" recorded at the album launch. In February 2012 he embarked on a sell out tour, the Letters Tour. The tour ended on 29 March 2012 at Hammersmith Apollo. In September 2012 he said this was his favourite gig so far in his career.

On 20 May 2012, Cardle announced on Twitter that he had parted ways with Columbia Records. In October 2012, Cardle explained he left Sony through his own choice because he wasn't a priority. "I would just have been left to get on with it while One Direction ruled the planet. Which is brilliant for them – I'm so proud of them – but I needed to be a bit selfish. I asked Sony to let me go and they said okay." Later, in October 2013 he stated another reason for leaving was because of the lack of control he had with decisions such as "Run for Your Life" being released as his first single instead of "Starlight" which he'd written and preferred.

On 9 September 2012, So What Recordings, part of the Silva Screen Music Group, announced that Cardle's second album, The Fire would be released on 29 October 2012 on their label. On 11 September 2012, the lead single, "It's Only Love" was released online on Cardle's YouTube channel as an audio only video. The video for the song was premiered on 3 October. Even though the song was promoted as being the lead single, it was not released as a standalone product and was only made available to buy at the same time as the album, and therefore it did not enter the singles chart. The Fire debuted at number eight in the UK Albums Chart, giving Cardle his second top 10 album. He said the album is more like what he did before The X Factor than Letters, and feels more honest. "I'm getting closer to myself, and getting back to what I do and what I've always done." A second single, "Anyone Else" was released on 31 December 2012. On 10 December 2012 an Unplugged Tour was announced on Cardle's website. Tickets went on general sale on 12 December with some dates selling out on the first day. The tour ran through April and May 2013 over the UK and Ireland.

=== 2013–2014: Porcelain ===
On 16 April 2013 Cardle confirmed he was in the process of making his third album in a video message to his fans on Facebook. In July 2013, Music Week announced he has teamed up with Absolute Marketing for the album, which is an independent release, having moved on from So What Recordings. The title, Porcelain, was revealed on 19 August 2013, with 28 October 2013 as the release date. It is described as incorporating "everything from Rock, Funk, Soul, Gospel, Pop and Blues to create his most musically diverse piece of work yet." The first single, a duet with Melanie C called "Loving You", premiered on The Ken Bruce Show on BBC Radio 2 on 2 July. It was released 18 August 2013 and had a positive response on the charts in UK. It reached number 14 on the single chart, number 2 on the Independent charts, number 11 in the Scottish charts and top 50 in the Irish charts. The second single, "When You Were My Girl", was released on 13 October 2013. On 8 October 2013 Cardle announced he has signed a worldwide publishing deal with BMG Chrysalis. Porcelain reached number 11 on the UK Albums chart. On 25 February 2014, he announced the next single from the album would be "Hit My Heart".

On 28 September, Cardle performed a cover of "The First Time Ever I Saw Your Face" at the Miss World 2013 in Bali, Indonesia. The Porcelain Tour in support of the album was announced on 30 October 2013, beginning in April 2014.

On 20 June 2014, Cardle performed a free gig at the Portadown's Got Talent awards, hosted in the People's Park of Portadown, Northern Ireland. The event is part of the Peace Process in Northern Ireland and is supported and backed by the EU.

=== 2015–2019: Musical theatre and Time to Be Alive ===
On 11 May 2015, it was announced Cardle would take over the lead role of Huey Calhoun in a production of Memphis from 6 July 2015 until the end of its run in October. It was his first acting role.

In August 2014, Cardle confirmed he was working on his fourth album. In 2016, he embarked on a summer tour, entitled the Intimate and Live Tour, to promote the new material and to test it live before recording. A limited edition live album recorded from the tour was released shortly after. Cardle explained the longer than usual gap in between albums was because he was "running on empty" around the release of his last album and that he needed to recharge. "What has been brilliant for me this time around is the more relaxed nature of the writing and recording process. I've had gaps where I've been able to live, recharge and become inspired again." He describes it as a lot more electronic than his previous albums.

Cardle's fourth album, Time to Be Alive, was released through Sony on 27 April 2018. The lead single, "Desire", was premiered on BBC Radio 2 on 13 March 2018.

Cardle returned to the West End on 31 July 2018, playing the role of Wally Strand in Strictly Ballroom until it closes on 27 October 2018. Cardle played the role of Pilate in Jesus Christ Superstar at the Barbican from 4 July until 24 August 2019. Later in the year he reunited with his former band Seven Summers for a gig in Chelmsford, and they have begun to work to new music together.

=== 2021-present: Purple Crayon and The Great Escape ===
Cardle announced the release of "Purple Crayon" on 12 January 2021, ahead of the release of his fifth studio album. The song was released digitally on 15 January 2021. Cardle says, "Purple Crayon is song about my struggles with addiction to Valium and the escape I found through using it. The song's emotions are intertwined with imagery from my favourite children's book Harold and the Purple Crayon." On 26 March 2021, Cardle released the second single from his upcoming album, "We're the Butterflies". On 18 June 2021, Cradle released the EP Purple Crayon. On 12 September 2022, Cardle revealed he was working on his fifth studio album.

In 2024 it was announced Cardle would star as William Shakespeare in the UK and Ireland tour of the musical & Juliet.

On 27 November 2025, Cardle released "Drinking Dreams"; the single is the lead release from his upcoming fifth studio album, The Great Escape, originally due for release on 10 April 2026, but later delayed until 3 July 2026. Upon announcing the album, the singer stated,

"I took a long hiatus from releasing music, feeling the need to reconnect with a feeling inside that I had lost. The Great Escape is a body of work over a decade in the making. I've drawn on years of highs & lows and love & loss – and at times needing to escape life & myself altogether. I've poured all that emotion into this album."

On 12 December 2025, it was announced that Cardle had signed with Absolute Label Services, the latter of whom will power the release of the album with a number of services including distribution, marketing and project management.

Cardle released the album's second single, "Fading Lights", on 9 January 2026. On 16 January 2026, it was announced that Cardle would be starring as Charlie Price in the musical Kinky Boots at the London Coliseum; the production runs from March to July 2026. He released the single "Mirrorball" on 28 March 2026, quickly following this by releasing the album's fourth single, "You Take The Sun", on 13 April 2026, and fifth single, "Painkiller, on 1 May 2026. He released the single "Stilettos" on 29 May 2026. "Broken", the album's seventh preceding single, was released on 19 June 2026.

== Artistry ==
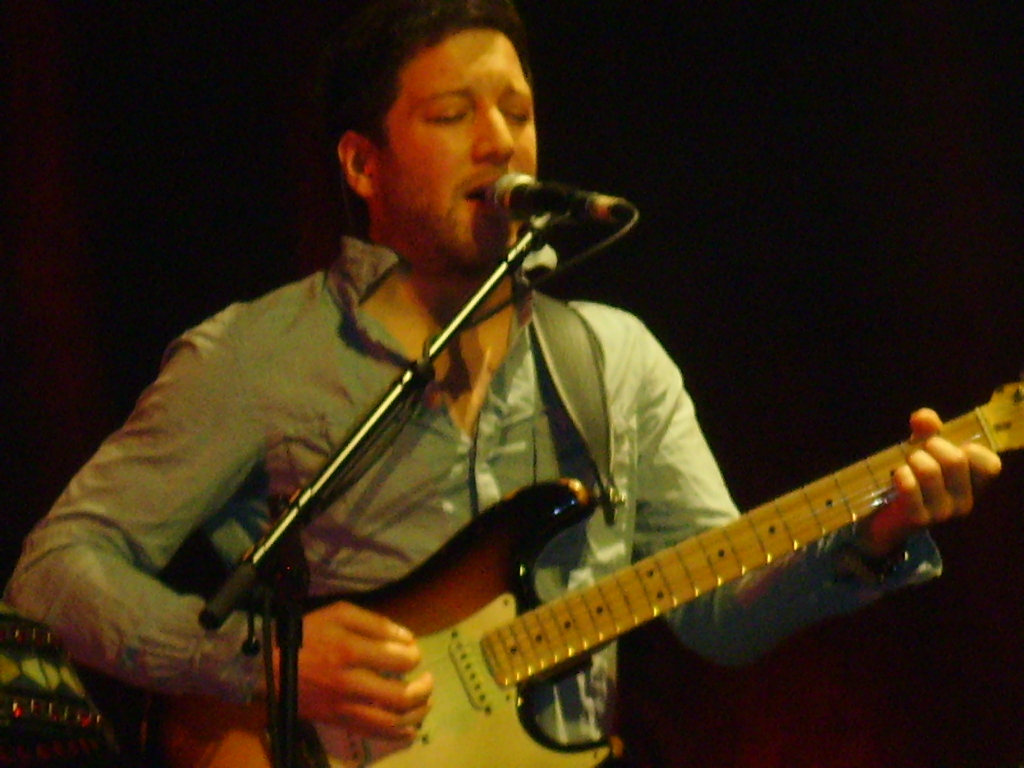
Cardle performing in Belfast, 2012

=== Music and voice ===
Cardle is a tenor with a vocal range of around B2-F5. Being a fan of heavy metal music from a young age, he had tried to emulate the singing style of his rock heroes such as Kurt Cobain, but found it was damaging his vocal cords. After taking advice from the owners of Highbarn, a venue in Essex he'd often played at in the past, he had vocal coaching, which helped increase his range and soften his sound. He is known for his falsetto and being able to reach notes typically unusual for a male singer. Upon Cardle winning The X Factor he has been involved in what type of music he would like to record, which led to the release of his debut album Letters. Cardle co-wrote eleven of the tracks which appeared on the album and a reviewer noted Cardle's "impressive falsetto".

=== Influences ===
Cardle said he was influenced by everything he has ever listened to, being a fan of a range of music. He said, "I love Dave Matthews and Rage Against the Machine are one of my favourite bands, but then again I also love Katy Perry and Lady Gaga, so kind of all sorts really. It's a pretty weird mix." He cites "Thank U" by Alanis Morissette as the first song he was really inspired by and is a big fan of hers. He has covered this song on tour as well as another of her songs, "Uninvited". Other artists Cardle cited as favourites when he began singing include Michael Jackson, Kurt Cobain, Pearl Jam and Peter Gabriel.

While recording his debut album, Letters, Cardle took many different artists as an influence; reviews compared tracks to those by artists such as Snow Patrol and Coldplay, as well as Chris Martin.

== Discography ==
- Letters (2011)
- The Fire (2012)
- Porcelain (2013)
- Time to Be Alive (2018)
- The Great Escape (2026)

== Tours ==
- The X Factor Live Tour (2011)
- Letters Tour (2012)
- Unplugged Tour (2013)
- Porcelain Tour (2014)
- Intimate and Live Tour (2016)

== Copyright lawsuit ==
In 2012, Cardle published the song "Amazing", co-written by himself, with Martin Harrington, Tom Leonard, Ash Howes and Richard Stannard. The chorus of the song was claimed to be plagiarised by Ed Sheeran in the chorus of his song, "Photograph", written in 2013. The lawsuit was privately settled in April 2017, with no admission of guilt and an undisclosed sum.

== Publications ==
- Cardle, Matt (2010). Matt Cardle: My Story. Harper. ISBN 978-0-00-742670-6.

| Preceded by Joe McElderry | Winner of The X Factor; 2010 | Succeeded by Little Mix |
