= Rebecca Ferguson discography =

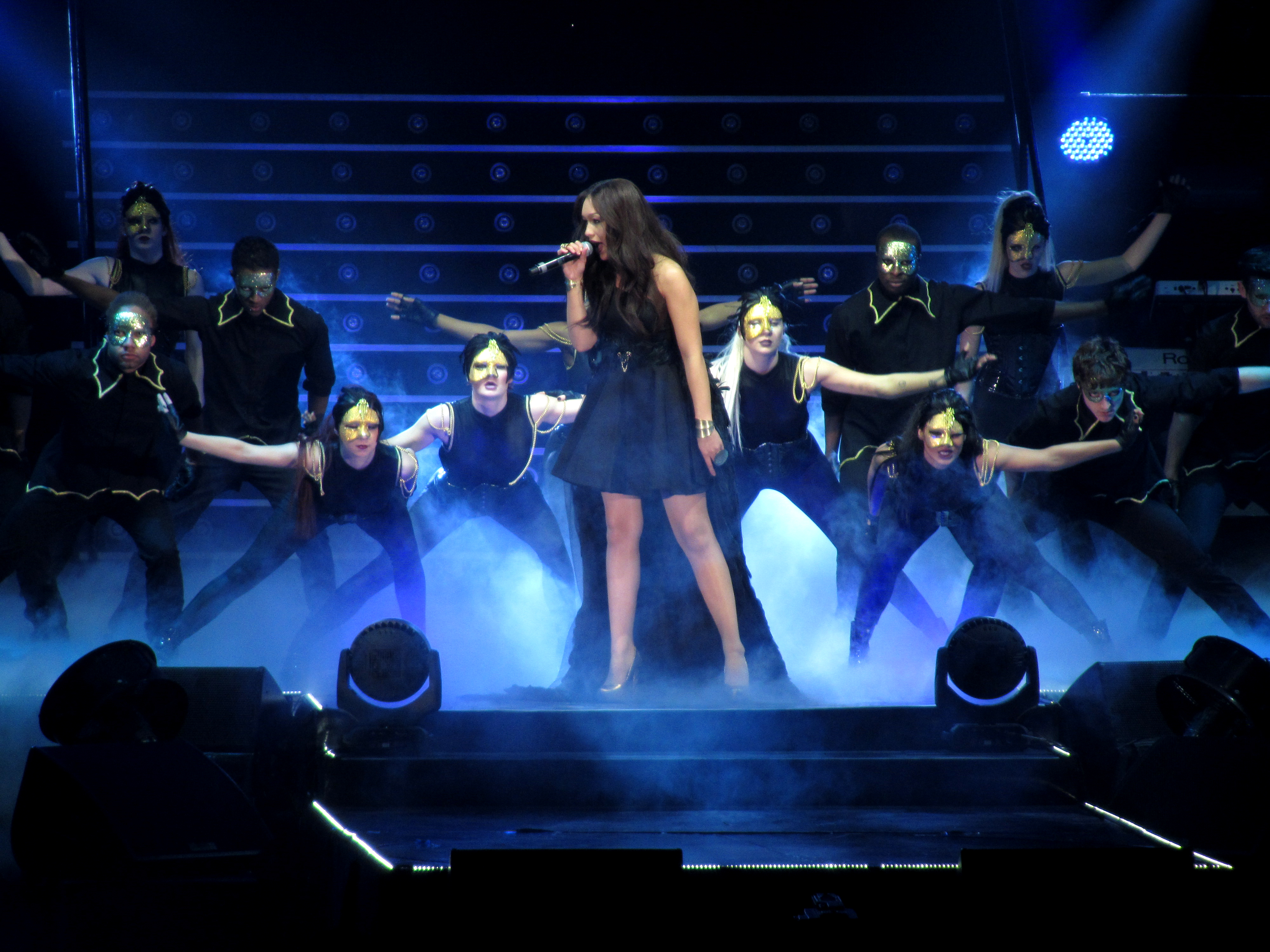
- Ferguson performing live in concert
- Studio albums: 5
- Extended plays: 1
- Singles: 16
- Music videos: 11
- Promotional singles: 1
- Featured singles: 3

Rebecca Ferguson is an English singer from Liverpool. She rose to fame in 2010 when she finished as the runner-up behind Matt Cardle in the seventh series of The X Factor in 2010. Ferguson's discography so far consists of five studio albums, sixteen singles, one extended play and eleven music videos. After two years of both critical and commercial success in the music industry, Ferguson has sold over 1 million albums worldwide.

Heaven, Ferguson's debut studio album, was released in December 2011. The album charted at number 3 on the UK Albums Chart and has been certified double platinum by the British Phonographic Industry (BPI) with a total number of sales of 536,960. The album debuted at number 9 in Ireland and was certified platinum. Heaven also has charted Internationally successfully with it peaking at number 7 in Switzerland, number 6 in the Netherlands and making the top 20 in Australia, peaking at number 14 and making the top 30 in both New Zealand and Italy, as well as charting in many other countries including the United States. Her debut single, "Nothing's Real but Love", charted at number 10 on the UK Singles Chart and 23 on the Irish Singles Chart. The song has also charted internationally, peaking at number 14 in Australia. The next single from the album was "Too Good to Lose", which was released on 4 March 2012. However, due to poor publicity, the single charted only at number 186 in the UK. In April, it was confirmed that "Glitter & Gold" was to be the third single taken from the album and was released on 29 April 2012, it peaked to number 116 on the UK Singles Chart and has also charted at 27 in Italy and 65 on the Irish Singles Chart. The fourth single from the album "Backtrack" was released a day before the deluxe edition of Heaven on the 14 October 2012. The deluxe edition of Heaven featured five new songs.

Freedom, Ferguson's second studio album, was released in December 2013. The album was preceded by the release of lead single "I Hope", the song peaked to number 15 on the UK Singles Chart. "Light On" was released in German-speaking Europe on 28 December 2013 as the second single from the album. "All That I've Got" was released on 2 March 2014 as the second UK single (third overall) from the album. Lady Sings the Blues, Ferguson's third studio album was released in March 2015. The album charted in the top ten of two countries.

On 5 December 2023 Ferguson released her fifth studio album Heaven Part II, a completely independent release.

== Studio albums ==
Title	Details	Peak chart positions										Certifications	Sales
Title	Details	UK	AUS	AUT	GER	IRE	NL	NZ	SCO	SWI	US	Certifications	Sales
Heaven	Released: 5 December 2011; Label: Syco, RCA; Formats: CD, digital download	3	14	18	15	9	6	22	3	7	23	BPI: 2× Platinum; IRMA: Platinum	WW: 1,500,000+; UK: 660,892
Freedom	Released: 2 December 2013; Label: Syco, RCA; Formats: CD, digital download	6	—	—	54	37	—	—	12	55	—	BPI: Gold	UK: 150,000
Lady Sings the Blues	Released: 9 March 2015; Label: Syco, RCA; Formats: CD, digital download	7	—	—	—	27	—	—	8	46	—		UK: 45,000
Superwoman	Released: 14 October 2016; Label: Syco, RCA; Formats: CD, digital download	7	—	—	—	37	—	—	7	91	—		
Heaven Part II	Released: 5 December 2023; Label: Minerva Oto; Formats: CD, vinyl, digital download	— (Note: "Heaven Part II" did not enter the Official Albums chart, but did reach number 89 on the Albums Sales chart, number 22 on the Album Downloads chart and number 19 on the Independent Albums chart.)	—	—	—	—	—	—	—	—	—		
"—" denotes a recording that did not chart or was not released in that territory.

== Extended plays ==
Title	Details
iTunes Festival: London 2012	Released: 16 September 2012; Label: Syco, Sony Music, RCA; Format: Digital download

== Compilation albums ==
Title	Details
Nothing's Real But Love	Released: 6 August 2021; Label: Sony Music; Format: Digital download

== Singles ==
=== As lead artist ===
Title	Year	Peak chart positions									Certifications	Album
Title	Year	UK	AUS	AUT	BEL	GER	IRE	NZ	SCO	SWI	Certifications	Album
"Nothing's Real but Love"	2011	10	14	—	97	64	23	34	10	24	BPI: Silver; ARIA: Gold; FIMI: Gold	Heaven
"Too Good to Lose"	2012	186	—	—	—	—	—	—	—	—		Heaven
"Glitter & Gold"	2012	116	—	51	—	68	65	—	—	36	FIMI: Gold	Heaven
"Backtrack"	2012	15	—	—	—	—	23	—	13	—		Heaven
"Shoulder to Shoulder"	2012	—	—	—	—	—	—	—	—	—		Heaven
"Teach Me How to Be Loved"	2012	128	—	—	—	92	—	—	67	66		Heaven
"I Hope"	2013	15	—	—	—	—	33	—	8	—		Freedom
"Light On"	2013	—	—	41	—	40	—	—	—	52		Freedom
"All That I've Got"	2014	150	—	—	—	—	—	—	—	—		Freedom
"Get Happy"	2015	—	—	—	—	—	—	—	—	—		Lady Sings the Blues
"Freedom" (Brothers of the Wind version)	2016	—	—	—	—	—	—	—	—	—		Brothers of the Wind
"Bones"	2016	— (Note: "Bones" did not enter the UK Singles Chart, but peaked at number 70 on the UK Singles Downloads Chart.)	—	—	—	—	—	—	67	—		Superwoman
"Superwoman"	2016	—	—	—	—	—	—	—	—	—		Superwoman
"Nothing Left but Family" (featuring Nile Rodgers)	2020	—	—	—	—	—	—	—	—	—		Non-album singles
"No Words Needed" (featuring Nile Rodgers)	2021	169	—	—	—	—	—	—	—	—		Non-album singles
"Diamonds In Her Shoes"	2024	—	—	—	—	—	—	—	—	—		Heaven Part II
"Christmas Will Find You"	2024	—	—	—	—	—	—	—	—	—		
"I Go Out"	2026	—	—	—	—	—	—	—	—	—		Non-album singles
"—" denotes a recording that did not chart or was not released in that territory.												Non-album singles

=== As featured artist ===
Title	Year	Peak chart positions			Album
Title	Year	UK	IRE	SCO	Album
"Heroes" (as part of The X Factor Finalists 2010)	2010	1	1	1	Charity single
"He Ain't Heavy, He's My Brother" (as part of The Justice Collective)	2012	1	4	2	Charity single
"Stop Crying Your Heart Out" (as BBC Radio 2's Allstars)	2020	7	—	—	Charity single
"Waiting for Sunshine" (AFSHEEN feat. Rebecca Ferguson)	2023	—	—	—	Small World
"—" denotes a recording that did not chart or was not released in that territory.

=== Promotional singles ===
Title	Year	Album
"Fairytale (Let Me Live My Life This Way)"	2011	Heaven
"Uncrazy"	2017	Non-album singles
"Creatures of the Night" (Collaboration with Afsheen)	2018	Non-album singles
"I'll Be There" (Collaboration with Rogerseventytwo)	2019	Non-album singles

== Soundtracks ==
Title	Year	Album
"Heroes"	2013	Justin and the Knights of Valour soundtrack

== Music videos ==
Title	Year
"Heroes" (as part of The X Factor Finalists 2010)	2010
"Nothing's Real but Love"	2011
"Nothing's Real but Love" (Live)	2011
"Too Good to Lose"	2012
"Glitter & Gold"	2012
"Backtrack"	2012
"Teach Me How to Be Loved"	2012
"Strange & Beautiful (I'll Put a Spell on You)"	2012
"Shoulder to Shoulder"	2012
"He Ain't Heavy, He's My Brother" (as part of The Justice Collective)	2012
"I Hope"	2013
"Get Happy" (Live)	2015
"Embraceable You" (Live)	2015
"Blue Moon" (Live)	2015
"Bones"	2016
"Superwoman"	2016
