= Freedom (Rebecca Ferguson album) =

Studio album by Rebecca Ferguson
- Released: 29 November 2013
- Genres: Pop; R&B
- Length: 38:00
- Labels: Syco; RCA
- Producers: Jarrad Rogers; Eg White; TMS; Toby Gad; Mr Hudson; Steve Robson; Matt Hales; Steve Booker

Rebecca Ferguson chronology
iTunes Festival: London 2012 (2012)	Freedom (2013)	Lady Sings the Blues (2015)

Singles from Freedom
- 1. "I Hope" Released: 1 December 2013; 2. "Light On" Released: 28 December 2013; 3. "All That I've Got" Released: 2 March 2014

Freedom is the second studio album by English singer-songwriter Rebecca Ferguson, and was released on 2 December 2013 in the United Kingdom, a day after the release of the album's lead single "I Hope". The album received positive reviews from critics, praising her vocals and movement away from her soul-influenced debut album, Heaven, into a more R&B, club-orientated sound. The album also attained moderate commercial success in the UK, where it became her second top ten album and achieved a silver certification from the BPI after just 3 weeks since its release date, followed by a Gold certification on 27 December 2013. The album was released through a joint deal between Syco Music and RCA Records.

Its lead single "I Hope" was released on 1 December 2013 and peaked at number 15, her third Top 40 single. In mainland Europe, "Light On" was released as the second single from the album after a television performance of the track which entered it in the German Top 40 singles.

== Background ==
In November 2012, Ferguson said that following her US tour in early 2013, she would go back to the studio and begin writing for her second album which was aimed for release in late in 2013 or early 2014. Ferguson considered Freedom stronger and edgier than its predecessor. In July 2013, she stated through a series of posts on Twitter that she was "proud" of her new album and that the "album has been hard to make." She also revealed that she had written songs "inspired by her babies." Meanwhile, Ferguson had settled a dispute with her former management team, Modest! Management, after branding them "vile" for not allowing her enough time off to see her children. The parties "settled their outstanding legal disputes" for an undisclosed sum of money. On 22 August 2013, Ferguson formally announced via Twitter that the new record was to be titled Freedom, and would be released on 2 December 2013 in the United Kingdom.

== Release ==
On 17 October 2013, Ferguson unveiled the album artwork. The cover depicts Ferguson wearing a red gown giving her a 70s look. Mike Wass of Idolator wrote that the cover is "exquisite and she’s raising glamour to previously unimagined heights by channeling Diana Ross on the cover."

== Promotion ==
On 11 November 2013 Ferguson premiered samples of five songs via Popjustice earlier including "All That I've Got", "My Best", "Hanging On" and "Bridges". On 12 November 2013, "Fake Smile" was made available to free digital download on Amazon.co.uk. The same day, Ferguson played an intimate show at the Under the Bridge venue, in London, performing 6 songs from Freedom, 6 others from Heaven and a cover of Katy Perry's "Roar". On 14 November 2013, she performed "All That I've Got" on The Paul O'Grady Show.

== Singles ==
The lead single for the album, "I Hope", premiered on 12 October 2013 and was originally slated to be released on 24 November 2013; however, the release date was pushed back a week to 1 December 2013. The official music video was uploaded onto Ferguson's YouTube account on 21 October 2013. About the message of the song, Ferguson said, "It's about coming out of something really messy like a messy relationship and finally getting to the point where you choose to forgive the person that's hurt you rather than holding a grudge." The song became a success entering the UK Singles Chart at number 15, becoming Ferguson's third top twenty single, after Nothing's Real but Love and Backtrack, and serving as her second most successful single to date.

'Light On', a German bonus track, was released as the album's second single after a television performance in Germany which saw the track make a top 40 appearance.

The second UK single "All That I've Got" was confirmed as the second single from the album with a release date of 2 March.

== Critical reception ==
Professional ratings
Review scores
Source	Rating
Digital Spy	5/5 stars
The Independent	4/5 stars
The Daily Telegraph	4/5 stars
The Guardian	4/5 stars
Entertainment Focus	5/5 stars
Female First	4/5 stars
musicOMH	4/5 stars
The Observer	3/5 stars

On 23 September 2013, Ferguson debuted four tracks from the album for music critics—"I Hope", "Fake Smile", "Freedom" and "All That I Got". They were all met with acclaim; Digital Spy's Robert Copsey called "Fake Smile" smooth and soulful, whilst praising Ferguson's vocals on the track. The Huffington Post called the tracks performed stronger and fiercer than on Heaven.

Freedom received universal acclaim from critics. Digital Spy gave the album 5 out of 5 stars, noting how "Rebecca has developed into an artist who can produce incredibly good albums" and saying that "Freedom is proof that the critical applause for Ferguson's debut wasn't down to a fluke." Entertainment Focus was very positive while discussing the album and said that "Freedom is a bold statement from an artist that is going nowhere for the foreseeable future and emphasises quality. Ferguson is a class act and her success is destined to continue for years to come." The Independent praised the album by writing a 4 out of 5 stars review and said: "It’s this satisfying emotional arc that gives Freedom much of its power, and raises the album above the level of simply a collection of songs". Daniel Falconer from Female First gave the album 4/5 stars, commenting "This album's a step-up from her previous - something that's to be admired by a sophomore collection - and though her impact hasn't been as major as it could have been, it's one that's slowly growing and should reach boiling point pretty soon".

Laurence Green of musicOMH gave a rating of four stars out of five, saying "with Freedom, Ferguson evidences a marked maturity as an artist – one that sees this record playing to her strengths on one hand, whilst showcasing a deeper, richer swathe of emotional depth with the other. Amongst a legion of former reality show contestants so often lambasted for being plastic, cookie-cutter clones, Ferguson’s music remains thrillingly suffused with life, personality and warmth". Neil McCormick of The Daily Telegraph gave a positive review with four stars, saying, "Ferguson’s attempts to dance away the heartache turn into a kind of therapy disco session, while too many songs rely on her voice to overcome pop-psychology messages."

== Track listing ==
Freedom – Standard version
No.	Title	Writer(s)	Producer(s)	Length
1.	"I Hope"	Rebecca Ferguson; J Loos; Jarrad Rogers	Jarrad Rogers/J Loos	4:01
2.	"Fake Smile"	Rebecca Ferguson; Francis White	Francis White	3:59
3.	"Bridges" (featuring John Legend)	John Legend; J Loos; Steve Robson	Steve Robson/J Loos	3:27
4.	"My Best"	Rebecca Ferguson; Thomas Barnes; Peter Kelleher; Ben Kohn	TMS	3:49
5.	"All That I've Got"	Rebecca Ferguson; Jarrad Rogers	Jarrad Rogers/J Loos	3:41
6.	"Hanging On"	Rebecca Ferguson; Jarrad Rogers	Jarrad Rogers/J Loos	3:41
7.	"My Freedom"	Rebecca Ferguson; Francis White	Francis White	3:31
8.	"Beautiful Design"	Rebecca Ferguson; J Loos; Mr Hudson	Mr Hudson/J Loos	3:41
9.	"Wonderful World"	Rebecca Ferguson; Toby Gad	Toby Gad/J Loos	3:26
10.	"We'll Be Fine"	Rebecca Ferguson; Jarrad Rogers	Jarrad Rogers/J Loos	3:38
11.	"I Choose You"	Rebecca Ferguson; Matt Hales	Matt Hales	3:48
12.	"Freedom"	Rebecca Ferguson; J Loos; Jarrad Rogers	Jarrad Rogers/J Loos	3:08

Freedom – Deluxe edition bonus disc
No.	Title	Writer(s)	Producer(s)	Length
1.	"Rollin'"	Ferguson; Steve Booker	Booker	3:41
2.	"I Hope" (Live at Air Studios)	Ferguson; Rogers		3:59
3.	"Fake Smile" (Live at Air Studios)	Ferguson; White		3:19
4.	"All That I've Got" (Live at Air Studios)	Ferguson; Rogers		3:37
5.	"Freedom" (Live at Air Studios)	Ferguson; Rogers		3:11

Freedom – iTunes deluxe edition bonus video
No.	Title	Writer(s)	Length
18.	"All That I've Got" (Live at Air Studios)	Ferguson; Rogers	3:38

Freedom – German bonus track
No.	Title	Writer(s)	Director(s)	Length
13.	"Light On"	Ferguson; Rogers	Alexander Geringas	3:30

== Charts and certifications ==
=== Weekly charts ===
Chart (2013)	Peak position
German Albums (Offizielle Top 100)	54
Irish Albums (IRMA)	37
Scottish Albums (Official Charts)	12
Swiss Albums (Schweizer Hitparade)	55
UK Albums (Official Charts)	6

=== Year-end charts ===
Chart (2013)	Position
UK Albums (OCC)	80

=== Certifications ===
Region	Certification	Certified units/sales
United Kingdom (BPI)	Gold	149,280

== Release history ==
Country	Date	Version	Format	Label
Ireland	29 November 2013	Standard; deluxe	CD; digital download	RCA
United Kingdom	2 December 2013	Standard; deluxe	CD; digital download	RCA
