= Teach Me How to Be Loved =

Single by Rebecca Ferguson

from the album Heaven
- Released: 7 December 2012
- Recorded: 2011
- Genre: Soul, pop
- Length: 3:50
- Label: Syco
- Songwriters: Rebecca Ferguson, Johnny Lattimer
- Producer: Lattimer

Rebecca Ferguson singles chronology
| "Shoulder to Shoulder" (2012) | "Teach Me How to Be Loved" (2012) | "I Hope" (2013) |

"Teach Me How to Be Loved" is a song recorded by British soul recording artist Rebecca Ferguson, taken from her debut album Heaven (2012). It was written by Ferguson and Johnny Lattimer and produced by Lattimer. It is the fifth official single from the album, having been released on 7 December 2012 in Germany.

== Live performances ==
"Teach Me How to Be Loved" was performed live at the Britain's Got Talent 2012 semi-final along with "Glitter & Gold", and also featured as a track Ferguson performed at the iTunes Festival and on the Heaven Tour.

== Music video ==
"Teach Me How to Be Loved" received a music video in November 2012, featuring Ferguson performing the song in a recording studio.

== Track listing ==
1. "Teach Me How to Be Loved" – 3:50
2. "Shoulder to Shoulder" (Piano version) – 3:04
3. "Nothing's Real but Love" (Acoustic version) – 2:57
4. "On & On" – 3:53
5. "Teach Me How to Be Loved" (Music video) – 3:42

== Chart performance ==
"Teach Me How to Be Loved" entered the Swiss charts at number 74, peaking at number 66. In Germany, the only country in which the single was released, the song peaked at number 92.

| Chart (2012–13) | Peak position |
|---|---|
| Germany (German Singles Chart) | 92 |
| Switzerland (Swiss Singles Chart) | 66 |
| United Kingdom (OCC) | 128 |
| Chart (2017–18) | Peak position |
| Scotland Singles (OCC) | 67 |
| UK Singles Downloads (OCC) | 84 |
| UK Singles Sales Chart (OCC) | 84 |

== Release history ==
| Country | Date | Format |
|---|---|---|
| Europe | 7 December 2012 | Digital download |
