= All That I've Got =

All That I've Got may refer to:

- "All That I've Got" (The Used song)
- "All That I've Got" (Rebecca Ferguson song)
- "All That I've Got (I'm Gonna Give It to You)", a song by Billy Preston

== See also ==
- "All That I Got (The Make-Up Song)", a song by Fergie from the 2006 album The Dutchess
- "All That I Got Is You", a song by Ghostface Killah from the 1996 album Ironman
