= I Hope =

I Hope may refer to:

- "I Hope" (Dixie Chicks song)
- "I Hope" (Gabby Barrett song)
- "I Hope" (Rebecca Ferguson song)
- "I Hope" (Tedy song)
