= Light On (Rebecca Ferguson song) =

Single by Rebecca Ferguson

from the album Freedom
- B-side: "Rollin'"
- Released: 28 December 2013
- Recorded: 2013
- Genre: Pop, soul
- Length: 3:32
- Label: Syco, RCA
- Songwriters: Alexander Geringas, Nikki Leonti
- Producer: Alexander Geringas

Rebecca Ferguson singles chronology
"I Hope" (2013)	"Light On" (2013)	"All That I've Got" (2014)

"Light On" is a song recorded by British singer Rebecca Ferguson. Written by Alexander Geringas and Nikki Leonti and produced by Geringas, it was released in German-speaking Europe on 28 December 2013 as the second single from Ferguson's second studio album Freedom (2013).

== Background ==
"Light On" was released as the second single from the album after a television performance of the track; it entered the German Top 40 singles.

== Track listing ==
Digital download
No.	Title	Length
1.	"Light On"	3:30

German CD single
No.	Title	Writer(s)	Length
1.	"Light On"	Alexander Geringas, Nikki Leonti	3:32
2.	"Rollin'"	Rebecca Ferguson, Steve Booker	3:44

== Charts ==
Chart (2014)	Peak position
Austria (Ö3 Austria Top 40)	41
Germany (GfK)	40
Switzerland (Schweizer Hitparade)	52
UK Physical Singles (OCC)	5

== Release history ==
Region	Date	Format	Label
Austria	28 December 2013	Digital download	Syco, RCA
Germany	28 December 2013	Digital download	Syco, RCA
Switzerland	28 December 2013	Digital download	Syco, RCA
