= Backtrack (song) =

Single by Rebecca Ferguson

from the album Heaven (Deluxe Edition)
- Released: 14 October 2012
- Recorded: 2011
- Genre: Soul, jazz, pop
- Length: 3:07
- Label: Syco
- Songwriters: Rebecca Ferguson, Jonny Lattimer
- Producers: Jonny Lattimer, Tim Baxter

Rebecca Ferguson singles chronology
"Glitter & Gold" (2012)	"Backtrack" (2012)	"Shoulder to Shoulder" (2012)

"Backtrack" is a song recorded by British soul recording artist Rebecca Ferguson, taken as the lead single from the deluxe edition of her debut album Heaven (2012). The song was written by Ferguson and Jonny Lattimer, who produced the track with Tim Baxter as well. The song was released on 14 October 2012 in the United Kingdom, the day before the release of the deluxe edition of Heaven. The single already features as a bonus track on the U.S. version of Heaven. "Backtrack" contains elements of soul, jazz and pop. The single entered the UK Singles Chart at number 15, making it Ferguson's second top twenty hit.

== Background ==
"Backtrack" was announced as Ferguson's next single via her official website on 23 August 2012. It was released on 14 October 2012, a day before the release of a deluxe edition of her debut album. In an interview with the Official Charts Company, Ferguson talked about "Backtrack", stating: "I wrote Backtrack about someone who cheated on me," explains the singer. "But, I tried to put my own little spin on it and made it really upbeat. I recorded it with an amazing writer called Jonny Lattimer. It's a break-up song, but we put a positive spin on it so it's really fun, happy and something everyone can sing along to."

== Critical reception ==
The song "Backtrack" has received positive views from critics. Digital Spy rated the song 4 out of 5 stars. They reviewed the song as a "neat and sassy soul-pop ditty".

== Chart performance ==
Backtrack entered the UK charts at number 15, becoming Ferguson's second top-twenty single in the UK and became her second-highest charting after "Nothing's Real But Love", which charted at number 10. The following week, "Backtrack" dropped 5 places to number 20 in the UK. The single also charted at number 32 in Ireland. In its second week it climbed 9 places to 23 equaling her previous best "Nothing's Real But Love" on the chart and made her third Irish top 100 hit. The single also appeared on the charts in Hungary for one week, at number 27.

== Live performances ==
On 14 October, Ferguson performed "Backtrack" during The X Factor results show. She also performed the song on Loose Women on 22 October.

== Music video ==
The music video premièred on 3 September 2012 via Ferguson's official Vevo. The video charts the journey of the song from conception when Ferguson discovers her boyfriend has cheated on her, to the recording of the track in a studio and finally her performing it in a club. The video was directed by Ben Peters.

== Track listing ==
- Digital EP
1. "Backtrack" – 3:07
2. "Backtrack" (7th Heaven Club Mix) – 6:40
3. "Backtrack" (DEVolution Remix) - 5:55
4. "Backtrack" (RAW Club Mix) - 6:19

== Charts ==
Chart (2012)	Peak position
Europe (Euro Digital Songs)	18
Hungary (Rádiós Top 40)	27
Ireland (IRMA)	23
Scotland Singles (OCC)	13
UK Singles (OCC)	15

== Release history ==
Country	Date	Format
Ireland	14 October 2012	Digital download
United Kingdom	14 October 2012	Digital download
