= Too Good to Lose =

Single by Rebecca Ferguson

from the album Heaven
- B-side: "On & On"
- Released: 2 March 2012
- Recorded: 2011
- Genre: Pop, R&B
- Length: 3:44
- Label: Syco, RCA Records
- Songwriter(s): Rebecca Ferguson, Eg White
- Producer(s): Eg White, Mike Spencer (single version)

Rebecca Ferguson singles chronology
"Nothing's Real but Love" (2011)	"Too Good to Lose" (2012)	"Glitter & Gold" (2012)

"Too Good to Lose" is a song by British singer songwriter Rebecca Ferguson. The song serves as the second single from the debut studio album, Heaven, and was released in the United Kingdom on 2 March 2012. "On & On" was confirmed as the single's official B-side on Ferguson's website on 1 February. "On & On" is a cover of a song by the band Longpigs that originally appeared on their album The Sun Is Often Out.

== Background ==
The song is about Ferguson's relationship with a boyfriend, and says that signs of breaking up aren't as they seem. In the song she says "Hey I lost my phone/Maybe you called and I didn't pick up/And if you wondered that's all it means". Ferguson also says she would give up all the good things in the world just to be with the boy she loves, because he is "Too Good to Lose".

== Music video ==
A music video to accompany the release of "Too Good to Lose" was first released onto Ferguson's Vevo on 1 February 2012 at a total length of three minutes and thirty-one seconds. The video shows Ferguson strolling along Venice Beach, California wearing a red dress and features many bright and unique characters which implies all that is good cannot be lost.

== Critical reception ==
Robert Copsey of Digital Spy gave the song a positive review, stating:

"Maybe you called and I didn't pick up/ And if you wondered that's all it means," she assures in her peppery tones over a soul-tinged piano riff. Her smitten-but-still-independent stance makes for a wonderfully refreshing change from the 'til death do us part norm, especially when it comes sans in-yer-face finger snapping. Just effortless sass and sophistication.

== Track listing ==
Digital download
No.	Title	Writer(s)	Length
1.	"Too Good to Lose"	Ferguson, White	3:44
2.	"On & On"	Crispin Hunt, Richard Hawley Diarmuid Boyle	3:53

Digital EP

1. "Too Good to Lose" (Single Mix) - 3:35
2. "Too Good to Lose" (Seamus Haji Mix) - 3:00
3. "Too Good to Lose" (Dukebox Remix) - 3:38
4. "Too Good to Lose" (Ayo Mix) - 3:19

== Chart performance ==
Chart (2012)	Peak position
UK Singles (Official Charts Company)	186
