= All That I've Got (Rebecca Ferguson song) =

Single by Rebecca Ferguson

from the album Freedom
- Released: 2 March 2014
- Recorded: 2013
- Genre: Pop; soul
- Length: 3:41
- Label: Syco, RCA
- Songwriter(s): Rebecca Ferguson; Jarrad Rogers
- Producer(s): Jarrad Rogers; J Loos

Rebecca Ferguson singles chronology
"Light On" (2013)	"All That I've Got" (2014)	"Get Happy" (2015)

"All That I've Got" is a song recorded by British singer Rebecca Ferguson. Written by Rebecca Ferguson and Jarrad Rogers. It was released as a digital download in the United Kingdom on 2 March 2014 as the second UK single (third overall) from her second studio album Freedom (2013).

== Chart performance ==
=== Weekly charts ===
Weekly chart performance for "All That I've Got"
Chart (2014)	Peak position
Hungary (Rádiós Top 40)	11
Hungary (Single Top 40)	37

=== Year-end charts ===
Year-end chart performance for "All That I've Got"
Chart (2014)	Position
Hungary (Rádiós Top 40)	55

== Release history ==
Release history and formats for "All That I've Got"
Region	Date	Format	Label
United Kingdom	2 March 2014	Digital download	Syco, RCA
