= Lady Sings the Blues (Rebecca Ferguson album) =

Studio album by Rebecca Ferguson
- Released: March 6, 2015
- Studio: Capitol (Hollywood)
- Genre: Jazz
- Length: 53:06
- Label: Syco, RCA
- Producer: Troy Miller

Rebecca Ferguson chronology
| Freedom (2013) | Lady Sings the Blues (2015) | Superwoman (2016) |

Singles from Lady Sings the Blues
- 1. "Get Happy" Released: 2 February 2015

Lady Sings the Blues is the third studio album by British singer-songwriter Rebecca Ferguson. It was released on 6 March 2015 by Syco Music and RCA Records. The album is an interpretation of songs performed by American jazz singer Billie Holiday, predominantly from her 1956 album of the same name.

== Track listing ==
| No. | Title | Writer(s) | Length |
|---|---|---|---|
| 1. | "Get Happy" | Ted Koehler; Harold Arlen | 2:49 |
| 2. | "Fine and Mellow" | Billie Holiday | 2:37 |
| 3. | "Embraceable You" | George Gershwin; Ira Gershwin | 3:37 |
| 4. | "That Ole Devil Called Love" | Allan Roberts; Doris Fisher | 3:07 |
| 5. | "Blue Moon" | Richard Rodgers; Lorenz Hart | 2:51 |
| 6. | "I Thought About You" | Jimmy Van Heusen; Johnny Mercer | 3:04 |
| 7. | "Summertime" | G. Gershwin; DuBose Heyward | 2:51 |
| 8. | "I'll Never Smile Again" | Ruth Lowe | 3:22 |
| 9. | "Lover Man (Oh Where Can You Be)" | Jimmy Davis; Roger Ramirez; James Sherman | 3:19 |
| 10. | "All of Me" | Gerald Marks; Seymour Simons | 2:39 |
| 11. | "God Bless the Child" | Holiday; Arthur Herzog, Jr. | 3:34 |
| 12. | "What Is This Thing Called Love" | Cole Porter | 2:38 |
| 13. | "Stormy Weather" | Harold Arlen; Ted Koehler | 3:12 |
| 14. | "Lady Sings the Blues" | Holiday; Herbie Nichols | 3:37 |
| 15. | "Willow Weep for Me" | Ann Ronell | 2:39 |
| 16. | "Don't Explain" | Holiday; Herzog | 3:52 |
| 17. | "My Man" | Jacques Charles; Channing Pollock; Albert Willemetz; Maurice Yvain | 3:35 |

== Charts ==
| Chart (2015) | Peak position |
|---|---|
| Irish Albums (IRMA) | 27 |
| Scottish Albums (OCC) | 8 |
| Spanish Albums (Promusicae) | 44 |
| Swiss Albums (Schweizer Hitparade) | 46 |
| UK Albums (OCC) | 7 |
| UK Album Downloads (OCC) | 12 |
| UK Jazz & Blues Albums (OCC) | 4 |
