= I Hope (Rebecca Ferguson song) =

Single by Rebecca Ferguson

from the album Freedom
- Released: 1 December 2013
- Recorded: 2013
- Genre: Pop; soul; gospel
- Length: 4:01 (album version); 3:24 (radio edit)
- Label: Syco, RCA
- Songwriter(s): Rebecca Ferguson, Jarrad Rogers
- Producer(s): Jarrad Rogers

Rebecca Ferguson singles chronology
"Teach Me How to Be Loved" (2012)	"I Hope" (2013)	"Light On" (2013)

"I Hope" is a song recorded by British singer Rebecca Ferguson. It was released in the United Kingdom on 1 December 2013 as the lead single from her second studio album Freedom (2013). It was Ferguson's 3rd Top 20 hit in UK's singles chart, peaking at number 15.

== Background ==
In November 2012, Ferguson said that following her US tour in early 2013, she would go back to the studio and begin writing for her second album, which was aimed for later in 2013 or 2014. Ferguson considered Freedom being stronger and edgier than its predecessor. In July 2013 she posted a series of tweets on Twitter stating that she was "proud" of her new album and that the "album has been hard to make." She also revealed that she had written songs about her babies. Meanwhile, Ferguson had settled a dispute with her former management team, Modest! Management, after branding them "vile" for not allowing her enough time off to see her children. They "settled their outstanding legal disputes" for an undisclosed sum of money. On 10 October 2013, Ferguson announced that the lead single would be "I Hope", initially scheduled to be released on 24 November, one week ahead of the album's release. The single officially premiered on 14 October 2013.

== Artwork ==
The artwork was officially unveiled on 14 October 2013, the same day the audio for the single premiered. The artwork shows Ferguson leaning against a dark wall glowing blue and pink, wearing a lepord-print jacket, black shirt and gold locket.

== Promotion ==
On 1 November 2013, Ferguson uploaded a video of her performing the song live at London Air Studios. For some unknown reason she decided to perform album track (now the follow-up single) 'All That I Got' live on The Paul O'Grady Show on 14 November 2013 instead of 'I Hope'. She later performed 'I Hope' live on The X Factor on 1 December 2013.

== Music video ==
The music video for the single officially premiered on 21 October 2013. The video sees Ferguson singing in an apartment, while other scenes show different kinds of relationships and flames burning inside people, representing love and heartbreak.

== Critical reception ==
Lewis Corner of Digital Spy gave the song four out of five stars. He said: "Musically, 'I Hope' continues the star's penchant for a smooth soul number, but lyrically, Ferguson has more fire in her belly. "'Cause after a time you realised that it ain't easy/ 'Cause after a time you realised that you should've believed in me," she tells her past flame, rising above the ashes of a messy relationship to forgive his neglect. Ferguson's smoky tones are tinged with heartbreak, but with a new-found defiance and another chart-worthy midtempo track in her possession, she is burning brighter than ever before."

== Chart performance ==
"I Hope" debuted at number 15 on the UK Singles Chart on 8 December 2013, having debuted at number 57 on the Irish Singles Chart three days earlier. The song became Ferguson's biggest hit in Scotland, where it reached number 8, becoming her second top 10 single on the Scottish Singles Chart. The single also charted in the Top 40 in Romania following massive radio airplay.

== Track listing ==
Digital download
No.	Title	Writer(s)	Length
1.	"I Hope"	Rebecca Ferguson, JLoos, Jarrad Rogers	3:24
2.	"I Hope (Live at Air Studios)"	Rebecca Ferguson, JLoos, Jarrad Rogers	4:01

Moto Blanco Remix Single

1. "I Hope" (Moto Blanco Radio Mix) - 3:08
2. "I Hope" (Moto Blanco Club Mix) -6:25

== Charts ==
=== Weekly charts ===
Chart (2013–14)	Peak position
Hungary (Rádiós Top 40)	7
Hungary (Single Top 40)	8
Ireland (IRMA)	33
Russia (Tophit)	167
Scotland (OCC)	8
UK Singles (OCC)	15

=== Year-end charts ===
Chart (2014)	Position
Hungary (Rádiós Top 40)	56
Hungary (Single Top 40)	96
