= Glitter & Gold =

Single by Rebecca Ferguson

from the album Heaven
- Released: 29 April 2012
- Recorded: 2011
- Genre: Soul, jazz, pop, blues
- Length: 3:29
- Label: Syco, RCA Records
- Songwriters: Rebecca Ferguson, Alex Smith, Paul Barry
- Producers: Mark Taylor, Alex Smith

Rebecca Ferguson singles chronology
"Too Good to Lose" (2012)	"Glitter & Gold" (2012)	"Backtrack" (2012)

"Glitter & Gold" is a song by British singer songwriter Rebecca Ferguson. The song serves as the third single from the debut studio album, Heaven, and was released in the United Kingdom on 29 April 2012. The song was written by Ferguson, Alex Smith and Paul Barry, and was produced by Smith and Mark Taylor.

The song was included on the international soundtrack of the Brazilian remake soap opera Guerra dos Sexos.

== Background ==
The song was Ferguson's third single, and was scheduled to be released on 29 April 2012. It was co-written by Ferguson, Alex Smith and Paul Barry and was produced by Mark Taylor and Alex Smith. Whilst the title "Glitter & Gold" conjures up wealth, glitzy parties and expensive jewellery, the song is actually about friendships and about how money doesn't buy your soul.

== Critical reception ==
The song "Glitter & Gold" received positive views from critics. Digital spy rated the song 4 out of 5 stars. They reviewed the song as "tame by Adele's standards", and said the song is "as sour as Rebecca gets" when she has ended a relationship with her boyfriend. The Guardian described the single as "lovely" livened up with "a Mark Ronson-esque arrangement".

== Music video ==
The video premiered on 13 April 2012 in a Metro music video face off, Ferguson's video beating Jessie J's LaserLight by 2 rounds to 1. "In the video, we see Rebecca looking stunning at a party as she mingles and sings, seemingly giving advice to the partygoers as they turn into cardboard cutouts of themselves. Rebecca is there to help them make a choice: what is more important to their life, happiness or wealth?". The video was directed by Syndrome.

== Chart performance ==
As the third single from Heaven, "Glitter & Gold" was released on 29 April 2012. The song debuted at 164 on the UK Singles Chart, but climbed up to 116 after Ferguson performed the song on Alan Carr's Chatty Man. The song has, so far, peaked higher than Too Good to Lose, which peaked at number 186. The song also charted on the Irish Singles Chart at 65. To add to this, the song has also charted at number peaked at 27 in Italy, and peaked at 36 so far in the Swiss Singles Chart.

== Live performances ==
On 6 April 2012 Ferguson performed the song live at the Echo Arena. On 11 May she performed on Alan Carr: Chatty Man, despite having a broken leg.

== Track listing ==
Digital download
No.	Title	Writer(s)	Length
1.	"Glitter & Gold"	Rebecca Ferguson, Alex Smith, Paul Barry	3:29

Digital EP

1. "Glitter & Gold" - 3:29
2. "Glitter & Gold" (Live Version) - 3:28
3. "Glitter & Gold" (Cahill Remix Edit) - 3:24
4. "Glitter & Gold" (Tom Farrago Remix) - 3:39

== Charts and certifications ==
=== Weekly charts ===
Weekly chart performance for "Glitter & Gold"
Chart (2012–2014)	Peak position
Austria (Ö3 Austria Top 40)	51
France (SNEP)	146
Germany (GfK)	68
Ireland (IRMA)	65
Italy (FIMI)	27
Switzerland (Schweizer Hitparade)	36
UK Singles (OCC)	116

=== Year-end charts ===
Year-end chart performance for "Glitter & Gold"
Chart (2012)	Position
Italy (FIMI)	100

=== Certifications ===
Certifications for "Glitter & Gold"
Region	Certification	Certified units/sales
Italy (FIMI)	Gold	15,000^{*}
^{*} Sales figures based on certification alone.

== Release history ==
Release dates for "Glitter & Gold"
Region	Date	Format	Label
United Kingdom	29 April 2012	Digital Download	Syco Music, RCA Records
