= Shoulder to Shoulder (song) =

Single by Rebecca Ferguson

from the album Heaven
- Released: 9 December 2012
- Recorded: 2011
- Genre: Soul, pop, blues
- Length: 3:12
- Label: Syco
- Songwriter(s): Rebecca Ferguson, Eg White
- Producer(s): Lattimer

Rebecca Ferguson singles chronology
| "Backtrack" (2012) | "Shoulder to Shoulder" (2012) | "Teach Me How to Be Loved" (2012) |

"Shoulder to Shoulder" is a single recorded by British soul recording artist Rebecca Ferguson, taken from her debut album Heaven (2012). It was written by Ferguson and Eg White and produced by Lattimer. It was released as the fifth and final single from Heaven on December 9. In Germany, however, "Teach Me How to Be Loved" was released as the final single instead. Because it was never released as a digital download or physical CD, "Shoulder to Shoulder" is not considered an official single.

== Music video ==
The official video for the song premiered in late November 2012. It features Ferguson performing the song in a recording studio.

== Live performances ==
Ferguson performed the song on This Morning on 10 December and Alan Carr: Chatty Man on 14 December 2012.

== Chart performance ==
Due to little promotion and lack of airplay, the song only managed to chart #76 on the UK Radio Airplay chart. The single, however, became a top 20 hit in Ukraine.

| Chart (2012/2013) | Peak position |
|---|---|
| United Kingdom (Airplay Chart) | 76 |
