= Heaven (Rebecca Ferguson album) =

Studio album by Rebecca Ferguson
- Released: 5 December 2011
- Length: 35:40
- Labels: Syco; RCA; Columbia
- Producers: Tim Baxter; Steve Booker; Sam Holden; Jonny Latimer; Alex Smith; Fraser T. Smith; Mark Taylor; Eg White; Xenomania

Rebecca Ferguson chronology
Heaven (2011)	iTunes Festival: London 2012 (2012)

US cover artwork

Singles from Heaven
- 1. "Nothing's Real but Love" Released: 20 November 2011; 2. "Too Good to Lose" Released: 4 March 2012; 3. "Glitter & Gold" Released: 29 April 2012; 4. "Backtrack" Released: 14 October 2012; 5. "Shoulder to Shoulder" Released: 9 December 2012; 6. "Teach Me How to Be Loved" Released: 7 December 2012

Heaven is the debut studio album by English singer-songwriter Rebecca Ferguson. The album was released on 5 December 2011 under the recordings of Syco Music and RCA Records. Recording sessions include: London, Los Angeles and Sweden. Eg White, who has worked with Adele and Duffy, serves as a major collaborator. Additional producers and songwriters include Steve Booker, Fraser T Smith, Xenomania, Paul Barry and Mark Taylor. Ferguson later revealed that she would be co-writing the whole of her album in order for her to "connect" with the songs. The main genre from the album features genres like soul, pop, blues and R&B. The lyrical content of the album mainly explores the subjects of betrayal, friendship and love found, lost and unrequited. The album's music was compared to Macy Gray, Aretha Franklin, Adele, Joss Stone and Duffy. Ferguson also wished to record with Franklin on the album. The album's title Heaven came around as Ferguson said she was in "heaven" while recording the album.

The album received universal acclaim, receiving no less than four out of five stars from all critics. The Daily Telegraph said that "reality television has finally turned out someone who not only has the hallmarks of a real star, but is also an artist in her own right." Upon the release of the album, the album charted at number-three on the UK Albums Chart selling 128,458 copies in its opening week. The most copies for a number three chart position in 2011. It was held off the number-one by Amy Winehouse's posthumous album Lioness: Hidden Treasures and Michael Bublé's album Christmas. After two weeks of the album being released, the British Phonographic Industry awarded Ferguson with a Platinum certification. As of August 2012 Heaven had sold 536,960 in the United Kingdom.

A deluxe edition of the album was released in the United Kingdom on 15 October 2012. It features three new tracks and two covers. "Backtrack" was released as the fourth single on 14 October. "Shoulder to Shoulder" was released as the album's fifth and final single in the United Kingdom, while "Teach Me How to be Loved" was released in Germany as the fifth and final single from Heaven.

== Background ==
"I've loved writing and recording the album throughout this year so I'm really excited for everyone to hear it! I feel like I've learnt a lot about myself going through the writing process, putting my experiences on paper and into the tracks. It's a record I'm really proud of."

— Rebecca Ferguson on recording the album

Ferguson revealed that recording her first album was a dream come true after struggling to get into the Music industry and previously being rejected from The X Factor during series 2 and series 3 before deciding to try for P. Diddy's Starmaker in 2007 and then Britain's Got Talent in 2009; she was rejected from them all. She said when she got the rejections it was the hardest thing ever. She added that the first time she got rejected she was disappointed as she thought she had a talent, and could make it into the industry. She noted that she began to doubt her talent when she got rejected the fourth time. On 21 October 2011 Rebecca confirmed the title of her debut album, Heaven and would be released in the UK on 5 December 2011. She co-wrote the album with songwriters including Steve Booker (Duffy) and Eg White, who has previously worked with Adele, Duffy and James Morrison. After the X Factor Ferguson began dating fellow contestant from band, One Direction, Zayn Malik. She said that the split from Malik inspired her on her debut album. She went on to reveal that her album was based on previous relationships and her children, which is why she co-wrote everyone song on the album so the album could be "more personal" to herself.

== Development ==
Ferguson revealed that her journey throughout The X Factor and standing on the stage with Matt Cardle waiting for the winner's name to be called out enthused her to put the "feelings of that" into her debut album. She went on to say that on the album you can see the "vulnerability" of her which appears when she is singing on the stage. She went on to say that she was nervous after she wasn't crowned the winner of the show as she knew there was a risk she would not get a record deal after the show. It was revealed by Ferguson herself that label bosses Simon Cowell and head of RCA Records already had tracks for her to record, but Ferguson refused to record the material written for as she wanted to write her first LP to be written by her. She said; "Syco have been really brilliant – as soon as I put my foot down they back off completely. I just wanted songs I'd written on the album. At first I was going into sessions with writers who'd pretty much got all of the songs done already. But I told management they needed to let me write it because otherwise no-one's going to think I'm a credible artist. Then they let me just go into sessions on my own – I couldn't believe it." Ferguson said not only were they wanting to write the album for her, they were not writing the album the way she wanted it to be written. She confirmed that her album is a pop with a retro soul vibe which reminiscent Macy Gray and elevated by Ferguson's bruised voice.

"A lot of the songs are about past relationships. The theme is relationships in general, making them, breaking them, love and loss. Recording was hard. It wasn't a case of skipping to the studio and being happy. I got really emotional and sometimes I had really bad days. I poured out all my heart and soul into the album and would often cry. At the beginning they didn't know I could write so they were bringing songs in for me but I put my foot down and said if you want me to be a credible artist you have to let me write. Now I've co-written every single song on the album." She also revealed her life growing up with a Foster care family inspired her to write the album.

— Ferguson on her inspiration

Ferguson planned to have a collaboration with the Kings of Leon on the album. She revealed that she was recording the album for 11 months straight. Ferguson also revealed that she wanted to write her own songs in order for her to "connect" to the songs properly, though she did not have anything against people who do not write their own music. Ferguson said that her record label's gave her fantastic options for her album but the option were not for herself. She said the songs she was given were not bad songs, they were just not for her. The album has inspiration from Aretha Franklin who she calls the "queen of soul" Simon Cowell praised the album, saying that he was "blown away" when he heard it. She said that she would never be like Rihanna after she said she was a "bad role model" for her children and children around the world and Ferguson refuses to let her children watch her. Adele admitted she is a fan of Ferguson's voice.

== Composition and recording ==
Ferguson confirmed that after The X Factor Live Tour she was in the album full-time recording for around 11 months before deciding the album was ready to be released. About the lead single from Ferguson's debut album "Nothing's Real but Love", she said that the song pretty much sums her up as an artist, in the sentiment of the song. She went on to say that the song is not particularly commercial and saying the song is "a bit different" from what is currently being played on the radio at the minute.

She said that she thought it was important to put her "own little stamp" on her music and she hopes she has done that with the album. She said that the album focus's on relationships and that she has been "sternly honest" on the album, her relationship with her two children and her parents and growing up in a foster care home. she said that it also has her feelings of stuff which have "hurt" her in the past, and putting the feelings into words. Although that she previously said that the album's lyrics are inspired from ex-boyfriend Zayn Malik, she said she never actually "focused" on him throughout the album as the relationship didn't last long, but some of it was from that. However, she said that most of the lyrics were written on the relationship she was in from seventeen years of age [the father of her children]. She said that all of the album is not about relationships and some of the album is about a "normal" girl from Liverpool dreaming of being a star, which the track "Fly Away" focus' on.

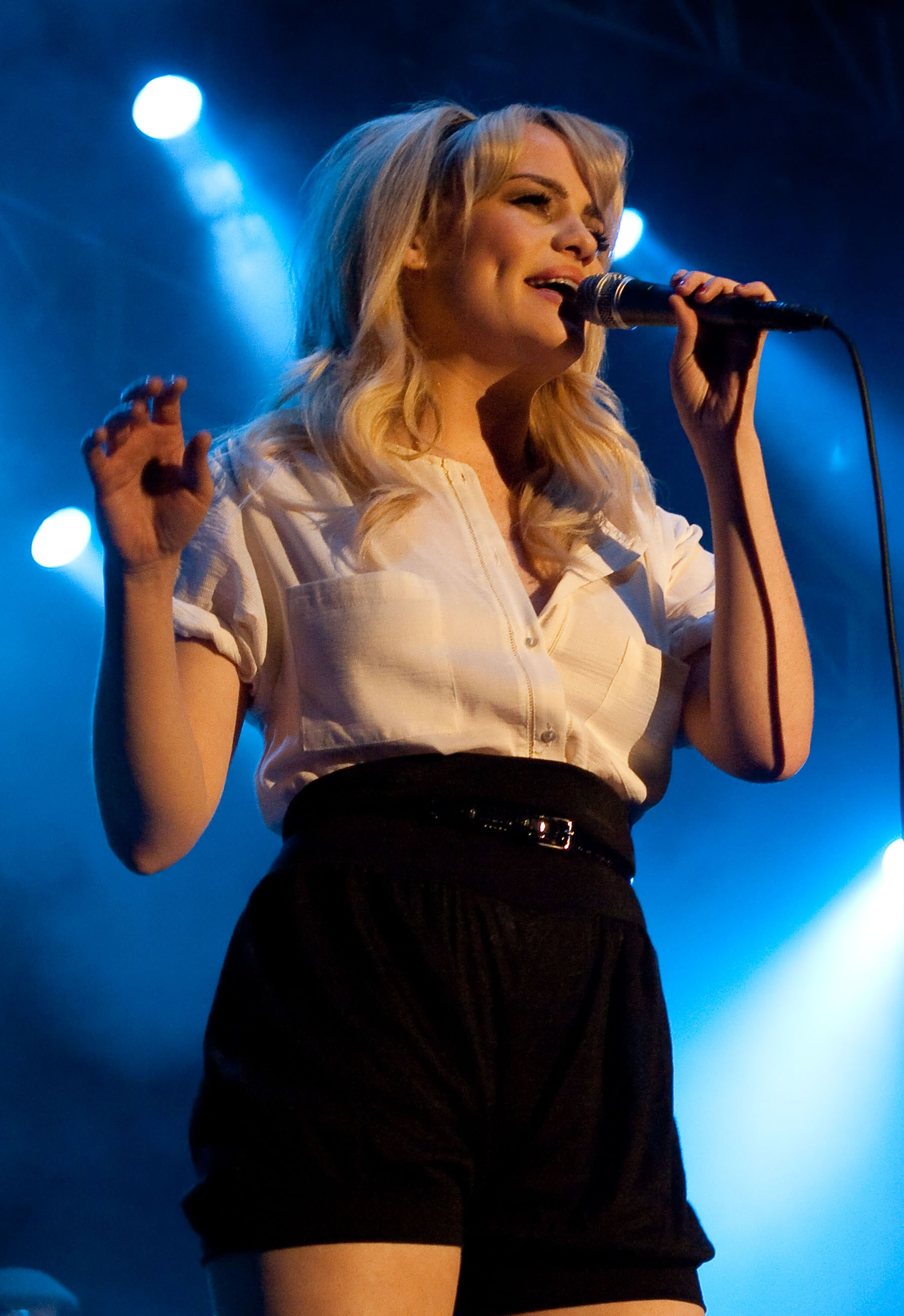
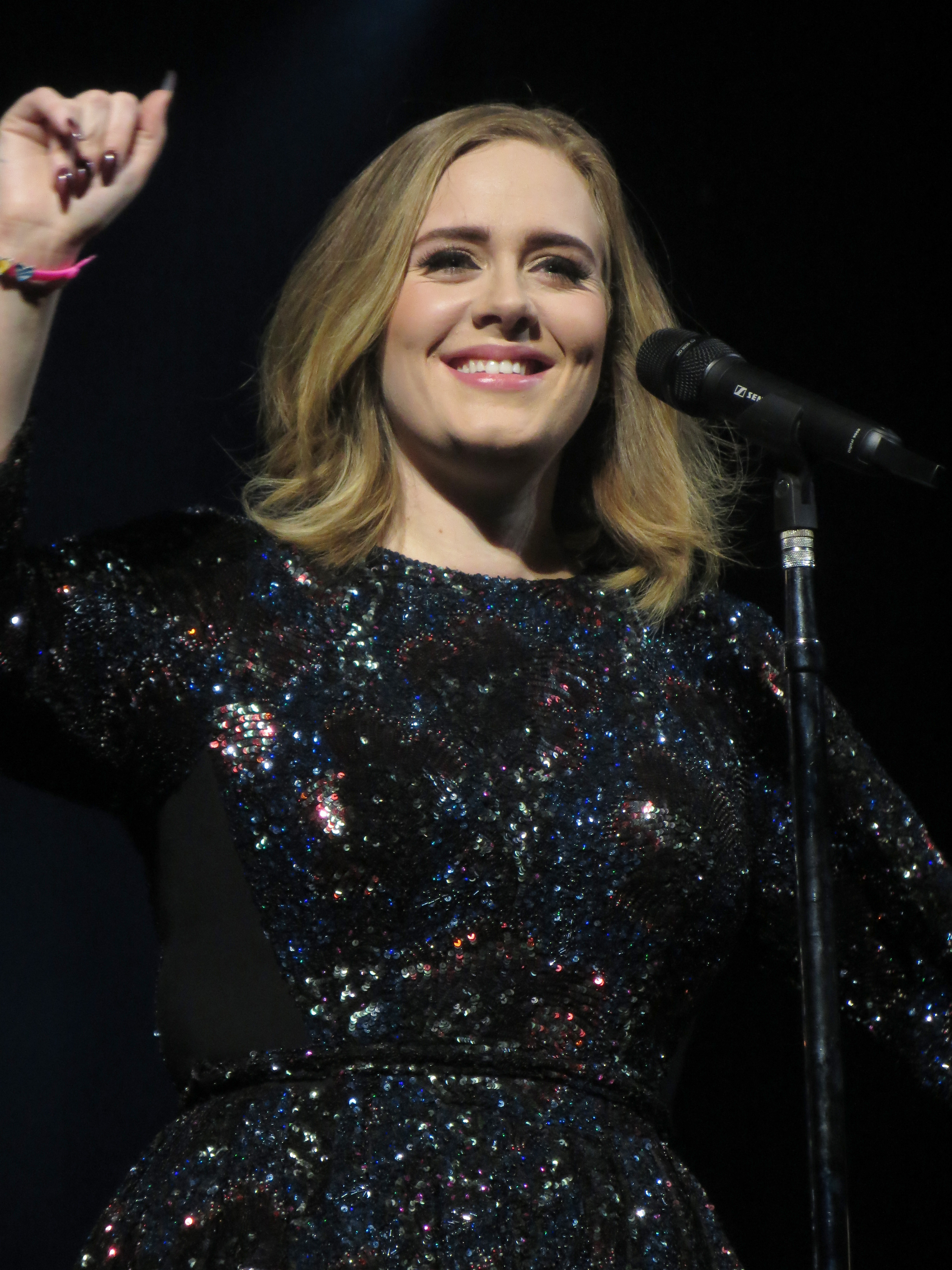
The sound of the album was compared to the musical styles of Duffy (left) and Adele (right).

She said that her album is "quite soulful" but couldn't compare it to anyone as it is "just her". She wanted to record with Aretha Franklin and Kings of Leon on the album. Ferguson said that she wrote one song every day for six months, but none of which appeared on the album as she scrapped them before she began recording. She said: "I was looking for songs that I felt especially connected to, and while some of the songs we got rid of were brilliant tunes, I just didn’t think I could sing them night after night for a year, if not longer, without feeling really close to them." She revealed that "Too Good to Lose" was her favourite track on the album, saying you can have a dance to the track and "Teach Me How to Be Loved" is the most meaningful song to her on the album. She said that "Shoulder to Shoulder" is a really emotional track. When Ferguson played the track to her friends they said "thats me and my ex-boyfriend". "Fighting Suspicions" was the most risky song and unusual song that Ferguson had written, she explained. She pointed out that the song is something that she would not normally write about. "Run Free" was quite a dancey track.

Ferguson revealed that she always knew what kind of music she wanted to make. She said that she didn't know how but she always knew that creating the album and being a popstar would be hard work, saying it may have been something she saw or read. She said that people are disillusioned [including her before the success] as they think it is all about turning up at fancy events and having loads of money but yet not working for it. She went on to say recording the album was early morning and lots of hard work, pointing out you wouldn't have it any other way. She revealed that her label promised her to fly on British Airways, yet she ended up flying on EasyJet to record her album.

== Singles ==
The lead single from Heaven, "Nothing's Real but Love", was released on 20 November 2011 and the video released showed Ferguson performing the song live. On 23 November, an official video of the single was released on her official website, the video is set in black and white and was filmed in various locations in London. The video has had over 3,500,000 views on YouTube. The single debuted, peaked on the UK Singles Chart at number 10. The single has spent ten consecutive in the top 75 to date. Ferguson performed the song for the first time during the live shows of the eighth series of The X Factor and also performed "Fairytale (Let Me Live My Life This Way)" on sister show The Xtra Factor on 20 November 2011 followed by a performance on This Morning on 25 November. Ferguson performed it a few weeks later and after the release of Heaven on The Graham Norton Show on 17 December. The song was later released internationally, in which the song charting in various countries such as Italy, Switzerland, New Zealand and Australia where it peaked at #14 and was certified gold for shifting 35,000 copies. "Nothing's Real but Love" was used in a television advertisement campaign for Nescafé Gold Blend coffee, and was covered by contestant of The Voice (Australia). The song currently leads as her most successful to date, as well as her most well known.

"Too Good to Lose" was the second single to be taken from the album released in the UK on 4 March 2012 with the single version being edited to make it more radio friendly. "Too Good to Lose" has, to date only charted at only number 186 due to lack of promotion. The single's music video shows Ferguson strolling along Venice Beach, California the video received over 650,000 views on YouTube. "Glitter & Gold" was confirmed via Ferguson's official website to be the third single taken from the album and was released on 29 April 2012. The artwork for the single was added to the official website on 2 April with the official video following a week later on 13 April, which received over 550,000 views on YouTube. The single peaked at number 116 on the UK Singles Chart to add to this it has charted at number 65 in Ireland, 45 in Portugal and 27 in Italy. The song will be performed by Ferguson on Alan Carr's Chatty Man. So far, the song has been praised by critics and compared to Adele's "Rolling in the Deep".

"Backtrack" was released as the fourth single on 14 October 2012, a day before the release of the deluxe edition of Heaven. "Backtrack", one of Ferguson's more up-beat songs, has so far shown a positive reception to fans and the music video was released on 3 September 2012. On the day of the single's release, Ferguson performed "Backtrack" on the X Factor results show, however. The single peaked at number 15 on the UK Singles Chart, making her third top 20 hit in chart.

"Shoulder to Shoulder" was released as the album's fifth and final single in the United Kingdom on 9 December 2012. It received little promotion and thus failed to chart in the UK. A music video aired in late November 2012.

In Germany, "Teach Me How to be Loved" was released as the album's fifth and final single instead of "Shoulder to Shoulder". A music video aired in late November and the single was released as a digital EP on 7 December in Germany. It reached number 92 in Germany and 66 in Switzerland, while peaking at number 128 in the UK after a performance of the song on Britain's Got Talent whilst promoting "Glitter & Gold".

== Promotion ==
In United Kingdom, Ferguson performed "Nothing's Real but Love" on 20 November 2011 on The X Factor, "Teach Me How to Be Loved" on 10 May 2012 on Britain's Got Talent, "Glitter & Gold" on 11 May 2012 on Alan Carr: Chatty Man and "Backtrack" on 14 October 2012 in The X Factor. In United States, Ferguson performs "Nothing's Real but Love" on 29 May 2012 in The Today Show, "Run Free" on 24 September 2012 in The Tonight Show with Jay Leno, "Mr Bright Eyes" on 26 September 2012 in Good Day L.A.. Ferguson promoted the album with her tour, Heaven Tour.

== Critical reception ==
"I didn't even think of the audience when I was writing the album, I just thought I love this song. The feedback has been amazing, and the album's been getting praise from people I really didn't expect to like it."

— Ferguson shocked about the response to the album

Professional ratings
Aggregate scores
Source	Rating
Metacritic	84/100
Review scores
Source	Rating
AllMusic	4/5 stars
The Arts Desk	3/5 stars
Entertainment Weekly	A−
Consequence of Sound	4/5 stars
The Daily Telegraph	5/5 stars
Evening Standard	4/5 stars
The Guardian	4/5 stars
The Independent	4/5 stars
musicOMH	4/5 stars
The Observer	4/5 stars

Heaven received universal acclaim from critics. The Daily Telegraph gave the album 5 out of 5 stars, saying "There is nothing about this record I don't like. After 12 years, reality TV has finally turned out someone who not only has the hallmarks of a real star, but is also an artist in her own right." Digital Spy also gave the album a 5/5 review: "Fortunately, it would seem the best has been saved for last. She may have been branded "the shy one" on last year's show, but there's plenty of evidence here to suggest she won't take any crap (she insisted on co-writing each of the album's ten tracks)." The Independent gave a very positive review, claiming "By the law of averages, talent-show telly has to throw up at least one genuinely serviceable talent every ten years or so, and Rebecca Ferguson is surely that one."

Cheryl Cole, Ferguson's mentor on The X Factor, expressed her views over the album, stating "Wow!". The Independent said; "It's not hard to understand why: there's a hard central core of reality, of real lived experience, running through these ten songs that's almost diametrically opposed to the usual soul-diva cliches promoted by shows like The X Factor. And Ferguson herself likewise avoids the showboating vocal frippery by which some contestants aim to brandish their technique." They went on to compare Ferguson's album to Carla Thomas, while also comparing "Glitter & Gold" to Adele's "Rolling in the Deep". Also, Daily News (New York) commented on how Ferguson is a contender to become the next Adele. Shah Salimat from MediaCorp's Xinmsn gave 4 out of 5 stars, noting how Rebecca "impresses with her signature brand of soul-blues" and that "Heaven is an album full of gems that remind us why Rebecca should have won The X-Factor in the first place".

== Chart performance ==
The album debuted at number nine on the Irish Albums Chart. In the United Kingdom, the album entered the UK Albums Chart at number three, selling 128,458 copies, the highest for a number three album in 2011. The album was kept off the top spot by the first week sales of Amy Winehouse's posthumous album Lioness: Hidden Treasures, which sold over 194,000 copies, and Michael Bublé's album Christmas, which sold 190,000. Heaven became the second fastest-selling debut album of 2011 in United Kingdom; One Direction's debut album Up All Night was the fastest-selling album, selling 138,631 copies in its opening week. During the second week of sales, the album sold 96,000 copies, dropping it to number seven on the charts. After two weeks of the album being released, the British Phonographic Industry awarded Ferguson with a Platinum certification. During the third week, the album sold around 90,000 and it remained at number seven. The deluxe edition of Heaven re-entered the charts at number five. By November 2012 Heaven was certified double platinum. As of December 2012 Heaven had sold 586,000 in the United Kingdom.

In United States, Heaven debuted at 23 on the US Billboard 200, number 3 on the US R&B/Hip-Hop Albums and 20 on the US Digital Albums with first week sales of 12,006.

== Track listing ==
Heaven track listing
No.	Title	Writer(s)	Producer(s)	Length
1.	"Nothing's Real but Love"	Rebecca Ferguson; Eg White	White	2:54
2.	"Glitter & Gold"	Ferguson; Alex Smith; Paul Barry	A. Smith; Mark Taylor	3:29
3.	"Shoulder to Shoulder"	Ferguson; White	White	3:13
4.	"Fairytale (Let Me Live My Life This Way)"	Ferguson; White	White	3:23
5.	"Mr Bright Eyes"	Ferguson; Brian Higgins; Luke Fitton; Matt Gray; Toby Scott; Owen Parker	Xenomania	4:00
6.	"Fighting Suspicions"	Ferguson; White	White	4:15
7.	"Teach Me How to Be Loved"	Ferguson; Johnny Lattimer	Lattimer	3:50
8.	"Run Free"	Ferguson; Steve Booker	Booker	3:13
9.	"Diamond to Stone"	Ferguson; Fraser T. Smith	F. Smith	3:39
10.	"Too Good to Lose"	Ferguson; White	White	3:44
Total length:				35:40

German iTunes Store additional tracks
No.	Title	Writer(s)	Producer(s)	Length
11.	"Shoulder to Shoulder" (Piano version)	Ferguson; White	White	3:04
12.	"Too Good to Lose" (Dukebox Remix)	Ferguson; White	White; Dukebox^{[a]}	3:38

German Amazon.de additional tracks
No.	Title	Writer(s)	Producer(s)	Length
11.	"Too Good to Lose" (Seamus Haji Mix)	Ferguson; White	White; Seamus Haji^{[a]}	3:00
12.	"Too Good to Lose" (Ayo Mix)	Ferguson; White	White; Ayo^{[a]}	3:19

US edition additional track
No.	Title	Writer(s)	Producer(s)	Length
11.	"Backtrack"	Ferguson; Lattimer	Lattimer; Tim Baxter	3:10

US limited edition additional tracks
No.	Title	Writer(s)	Producer(s)	Length
11.	"Backtrack"	Ferguson; Lattimer	Lattimer; Tim Baxter	3:12
12.	"Nothing's Real but Love" (Acoustic version)	Ferguson; White	White	2:59
13.	"Glitter & Gold" (Live version)	Ferguson; Smith; Barry	Smith; Taylor	3:30
14.	"Fairytale (Let Me Live My Life This Way)" (Live version)	Ferguson; White	White	3:32
15.	"Shoulder to Shoulder" (Live version)	Ferguson; White	White	3:11

Deluxe edition
No.	Title	Writer(s)	Producer(s)	Length
11.	"Backtrack"	Ferguson; Lattimer	Lattimer; Tim Baxter	3:10
12.	"Strange & Beautiful (I'll Put a Spell on You)"	Matt Hales; Kim Oliver	Hales	3:39
13.	"Good Days, Bad Days"	Ferguson; Higgins; Jerome Isa-Marie; Gray; Parker	Higgins; Xenomania	4:18
14.	"I'll Count the Days"	John Lunn; Don Black	Lunn	2:42
15.	"I'll Take Care of You" (Live at Liverpool Echo Arena)	Brook Benton	Stephen Large	4:11

Notes

- ^{^[a]} denotes additional producer
- On the deluxe edition of the album, a new version of "Mr Bright Eyes" replaces the original. It bears minor differences to the original and is known as the "Single Mix".

== Credits and personnel ==
(Credits taken from Allmusic)

- Florrie Arnold – Drums
- Beatriz Artola – Engineer
- Ben Baptie – Assistant
- Guy Barker – Trumpet
- Paul Barry – Composer, piano, background vocals, wurlitzer
- Tim Baxter – Producer
- Richard Beesley – Saxophone
- Marcus Bonfanti – Guitar
- Steve Booker – Clavinet, composer, guitar, piano, producer, programming
- Nathan Bray – Trumpet
- Dan Carpenter – Trumpet
- Tom Cawley – Piano
- Rupert Christie – Additional production
- John Davis – Mastering
- Alessandro Destefanis – Assistant engineer
- Eg White – Additional production, bass, drums, guitar, mixing, piano, producer, programming, saxophone, background vocals
- Tom Elmhirst – Mixing
- Ben Epstein – Bass
- Rebecca Ferguson – Composer, vocals, background vocals
- Luke Fitton – Composer, keyboards, programming
- Fraser T Smith – Composer, guitar, piano, producer
- Matt Gray – Composer, engineer, keyboards, programming
- Richard Griffiths – Representation
- Brian Higgins – Composer, keyboards, producer, programming
- Jon Kelly – Engineer
- Jonny Lattimer – Composer, producer
- Harry Magee – Representation
- Sam Martin – Keyboards
- Pino Palladino – Bass
- Owen Parker – Bass, composer, guitar, keyboards
- Martin Radford – Cello
- James Roberts – A&R
- Toby Scott – Composer, engineer, keyboards, programming
- Alex Smith – Composer, guitar, producer, background vocals
- Ash Soan – Drums, percussion
- Ben Taylor – Engineer
- Mark Taylor – Keyboards, producer
- Phil Todd – Saxophone
- Utters – Programming
- Ellen Von Unwerth – Photography
- Francis White – Composer
- Neal Wilkinson – Drums
- Dave Williams – Trombone
- Xenomania – Producer

== Charts ==
=== Weekly charts ===
Weekly chart performance for Heaven
Chart (2011–12)	Peak position
Australian Albums (ARIA)	14
Austrian Albums (Ö3 Austria)	18
Canadian Albums (Nielsen SoundScan)	52
German Albums (Offizielle Top 100)	15
Dutch Albums (Album Top 100)	6
Irish Albums (IRMA)	9
Italian Albums (FIMI)	30
New Zealand Albums (RMNZ)	22
Scottish Albums (OCC)	3
Spanish Albums (Promusicae)	53
Swiss Albums (Schweizer Hitparade)	7
UK Albums (OCC)	3
US Billboard 200	23
US Digital Albums (Billboard)	20
US Top R&B/Hip-Hop Albums (Billboard)	3

=== Year-end charts ===
2011 year-end chart performance for Heaven
Chart (2011)	Position
UK Albums (Official Charts)	26

2012 year-end chart performance for Heaven
Chart (2012)	Position
Australian Albums (ARIA)	86
Swiss Albums (Swiss Hitparade)	68
UK Albums (Official Charts)	36

== Certifications ==
Certifications for Heaven
Region	Certification	Certified units/sales
Ireland (IRMA)	Platinum	15,000^{^}
United Kingdom (BPI)	2× Platinum	661,189
^{^} Shipments figures based on certification alone.

== Release history ==
Heaven release history
Region	Date	Format	Edition	Label	Ref(s)
Ireland	2 December 2011	Digital download; CD	Standard	RCA Records; Syco Music; Sony Music	
United Kingdom	5 December 2011	Digital download; CD	Standard	RCA Records; Syco Music; Sony Music	
Australia	13 January 2012	Digital download; CD	Standard	RCA Records; Syco Music; Sony Music	
Italy	7 February 2012	Digital download; CD	Standard	RCA Records; Syco Music; Sony Music	
Argentina	28 March 2012	Digital download; CD	Standard	RCA Records; Syco Music; Sony Music	
Germany	6 April 2012	Digital download; CD	Standard	RCA Records; Syco Music; Sony Music	
Brazil	2 May 2012	Digital download; CD	Standard	RCA Records; Syco Music; Sony Music	
United States	29 May 2012	Digital download; CD	Standard	Columbia Records; Syco Music	
United Kingdom	15 October 2012	Digital download; CD	Deluxe	RCA Records; Syco Music; Sony Music	
