= Nothing's Real but Love =

2011 single by Rebecca Ferguson

Single by Rebecca Ferguson

from the album Heaven
- B-side: "Shoulder to Shoulder" (piano version)
- Released: 20 November 2011
- Recorded: 2011
- Genre: Soul, pop
- Length: 2:56
- Label: SYCO, RCA
- Songwriters: Rebecca Ferguson, Eg White
- Producer: Eg White

Rebecca Ferguson singles chronology
"Nothing's Real but Love" (2011)	"Too Good to Lose" (2012)

Music video
- "Nothing's Real but Love" on YouTube

"Nothing's Real but Love" is the debut single by English singer-songwriter Rebecca Ferguson. The song serves as the lead single from the debut studio album, Heaven, and was released in the United Kingdom on 20 November 2011, having originally been scheduled for release the following week. The release was brought forward to coincide with the first official performance of the song on the eighth series of The X Factor. The song was written by Ferguson with Eg White, who also produced it. "Nothing's Real but Love" is a mid-tempo soul and pop song. The song also features on Ferguson's debut EP, iTunes Festival: London 2012.

"Nothing's Real but Love" received positive reviews from critics, praising the gentle acoustics and the lyrics. On 26 November the song debuted at number ten on the UK Singles Chart, The song made the top ten in Scottish Singles Chart as well, and charted at 23 in the Irish Singles Chart. The song also received international success, with the song charting in the top twenty in Italian and Australian singles chart. "Nothing's Real but Love" was certified Gold in Australia for shifting 35,000 copies.

The song was used in a television advertisement campaign for Nescafé Gold Blend coffee, and was covered by Karise Eden of The Voice Australia. Ferguson has performed the track live a few times, including on The Today Show, where she made her U.S. television debut.

== Background ==
The single was scheduled to be released on 27 November 2011, but the release date was brought forward to 20 November 2011 to coincide with her return to The X Factor, where she performed the track live on television for the first time alongside a performance of an album track on The Xtra Factor.

In terms of the actual meaning behind the song, Ferguson told Blues & Soul: "It's basically talking about how we get so concerned about stuff like money and cars that it overtakes our lives and we forget what's really important is FAMILY. I mean, I actually remember the day I wrote it with Eg White. Something had upset me, and I was like 'You know, people just forget what's important'... And then I literally just said 'It's not your money, it's not your car - it's LOVE!' - and straightaway we were both like 'Oh, we've got a SONG here!'!... And, while I know it sounds cheesy, I genuinely do think those sentiments are TRUE! Plus, I was standing in line and wondering why it don't move"

== Composition ==
According to the sheet music published by EMI Music Publishing, "Nothing's Real but Love" is a soul and pop song set in common time with 72 beats per minute. The song is written in the key of A Major, with the vocal range from the note of A3 to F#5. Nothing's Real but Love contains the instruments of guitars and a piano.

== Critical reception ==
"Nothing's Real But Love" received positive reviews from critics. Robert Copsey of Digital Spy gave the song four stars out of five and a positive review, stating:

"No money, no house, no car/ Is like love," she calmly ponders over gentle acoustics, allowing nothing but her voice to do the talking - one that is just as raw and shaky as it was this time last year but now with an added hint of diva ambition [...] the result is smooth, premium and leaves you feeling warm and fuzzy inside immediately after.

== Music videos ==
A music video to accompany the release of "Nothing's Real but Love" was first released onto YouTube on 2 November 2011 at a total length of two minutes and fifty-one seconds, which showed Ferguson performing live with her band.

The official video premiered on Ferguson's official website on 23 November and then went to all UK music channels. The video is in black and white and sees Ferguson singing along with intercut scenes of various people around the streets of London.

== Chart performance ==
The lead single from Heaven, "Nothing's Real But Love" was released on 20 November 2011. The single debuted on the UK Singles Chart at number 10. In February 2012 the single re-entered the official UK chart at number 34 and climbed two places to 32. The single spent eleven weeks in the top 100. The single peaked at number 23 in Ireland. The song debuted at number thirty-four in New Zealand, becoming her first record to chart outside the UK. The song also charted inside the top 20 of the Italian iTunes chart and has charted at number 16 on the Italian official chart. It peaked on the ARIA Charts at #41. Due to contestant Karise Eden singing it on The Voice (Australia) it re-entered the charts at a new peak of #14 and was certified gold. Karise's version placed at #11. The single also charted at number 24 in Swiss Music Charts.

== Live performances ==
Rebecca performed the song for the first time during the live shows of the eighth series of The X Factor on 20 November 2011 followed by a performance on This Morning on 25 November. Ferguson performed it a few weeks later and after the release of Heaven on The Graham Norton Show on 17 December.

== Track listing ==
Digital download
No.	Title	Length
1.	"Nothing's Real but Love"	2:56
2.	""Shoulder to Shoulder"" (Piano version)	3:04

Digital EP

1. "Nothing's Real but Love" - 2:54
2. "Nothing's Real but Love" (Logistics Remix) - 5:04
3. "Nothing's Real but Love" (T2 Mix) - 5:29
4. "Nothing's Real but Love" (Acoustic Studio Version) - 2:57

== Charts and certifications ==
=== Weekly charts ===
Chart (2011–12)	Peak position
Australia (ARIA)	14
Belgium (Ultratip Bubbling Under Flanders)	74
Belgium (Ultratip Bubbling Under Wallonia)	47
Germany (GfK)	64
Ireland (IRMA)	23
Italy (FIMI)	15
New Zealand (Recorded Music NZ)	34
Russia (Tophit)	228
Scottish Singles Sales (Official Charts)	10
South Korea International (Circle)	68
Switzerland (Schweizer Hitparade)	24
UK Singles (Official Charts)	10
US Adult R&B Songs (Billboard)	21
US Hot R&B/Hip-Hop Songs (Billboard)	68
US Hot Dance Club Songs (Billboard)	11
US Adult Pop Songs (Billboard)	40

=== Year-end charts ===
Chart (2012)	Peak position
UK Cross Rhythms Annual Chart	1

=== Certifications ===
Region	Certification	Certified units/sales
Australia (ARIA)	Gold	35,000^{^}
Italy (FIMI)	Gold	15,000^{*}
United Kingdom (BPI)	Silver	200,000^{‡}
^{*} Sales figures based on certification alone.^{^} Shipments figures based on certification alone.^{‡} Sales+streaming figures based on certification alone.

== Release history ==
Region	Date	Format	Label
United Kingdom	20 November 2011	Digital Download	Syco Music, RCA Records
United States	10 January 2012	Digital Download	Syco Music, Columbia Records
United States	5 March 2012	Hot/Modern/AC	Syco Music, Columbia Records
Germany	13 April 2012	CD single	RCA Records
