= Rebecca Ferguson (singer) =

English singer-songwriter (born 1986)

Rebecca Ferguson MBE
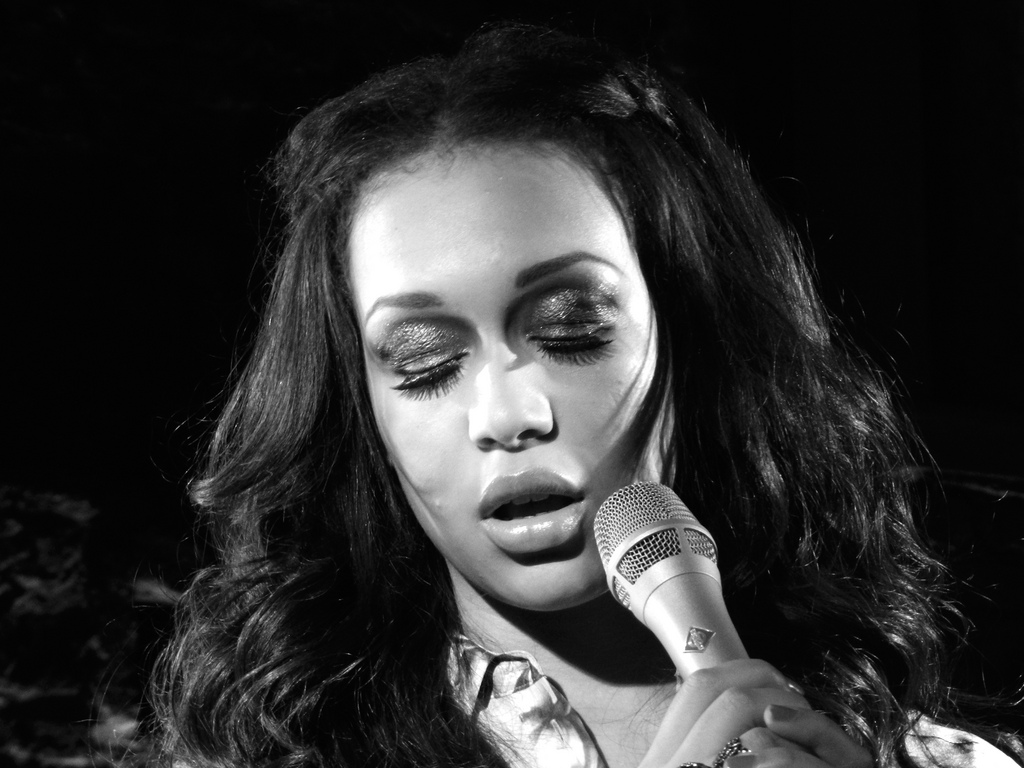
- Rebecca performing in Milan, Italy in 2012

Background information
- Also known as: Ferguson
- Born: Rebecca Caroline; 21 July 1986 (age 40); Liverpool, Merseyside, England
- Genres: R&B; soul; gospel; pop; jazz
- Occupations: Singer; songwriter
- Instrument: Vocals
- Years active: 2010–present
- Labels: Sony; RCA; Epic; Columbia
- Spouse: Jonny Hughes (m. 2022)

Rebecca Caroline Ferguson (born 21 July 1986) is an English soul singer and songwriter. In 2010, Ferguson finished as the runner-up in the seventh series of The X Factor. She later released her debut album titled Heaven in December 2011. The album peaked at number 3 on the UK Albums Chart, and went onto achieve another three top three albums with: Freedom (2013), Lady Sings the Blues (2015), and Superwoman (2016). She cites Aretha Franklin, Kings of Leon, Christina Aguilera, and Amy Winehouse among her influences.

== Early life ==
Rebecca Ferguson was born on 21 July 1986 in Liverpool to a father of black Jamaican descent and a white British mother. She has a younger brother. She spent the first two years of her life in Huyton. Her family moved to a house on an estate in Woolton Village when her parents separated. Ferguson received her primary education at Woolton Primary School and her secondary and sixth form education at Gateacre Community Comprehensive School. As a teenager she later moved to Anfield, where she became pregnant with her first daughter. Two years later she had her first son. Ferguson revealed that she always wanted to become a pop star when she was young and said that her family fully supported her passion of becoming a professional singer, helping her through two previous X Factor auditions. She also revealed that she was, "bullied as a kid because my family was poor, and I never had the right clothes or toys." Despite having a difficult start in life, Ferguson insisted that she wanted people to focus solely on her talent. She revealed on Loose Women that she was sexually abused in a care home when she was 8 years old.

Ferguson is a qualified legal secretary, having studied at Hugh Baird College, Bootle. She later commented, "There is only so long you can chase the dream when you are a mum. I wanted the kids to see me do well and be a better role model. They were always seeing their mummy fail. That was why I started college."

== Career ==
=== 2009–2011: Beginnings and The X Factor ===
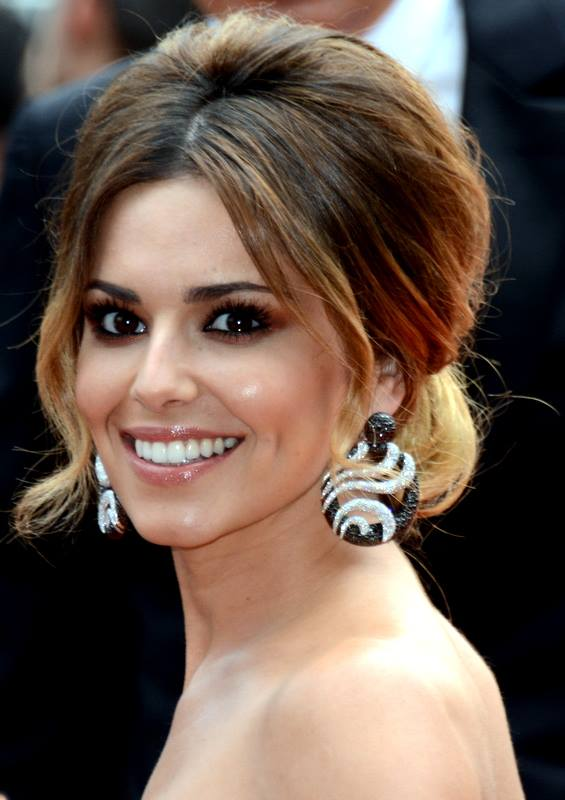
Ferguson was mentored by Cheryl (pictured) during her time on The X Factor.

Ferguson had previously unsuccessfully auditioned for The X Factor and for P. Diddy's Starmaker in New York. She later commented "I went to other auditions, I was invited to New York to audition for P.Diddy's Starmaker and I was told ‘no’. It was really upsetting because I spent money to get there. I also tried out for The X Factor but it did not turn out too well."

Ferguson sang "A Change Is Gonna Come" for her audition in front of judges, Simon Cowell, Louis Walsh and guest judge, Nicole Scherzinger. At her bootcamp audition, she sang "Like a Star". She sang "Fireflies" in the Judges' Houses round and was sent through to the live shows by mentor Cheryl in her Girls category (solo females aged 16–27). For the first live show she sang "Teardrops" and in the second live show she sang "Feeling Good". In the third live show she sang "Why Don't You Do Right?" and in the fourth live show she sang "Wicked Game". In the fifth live show, Ferguson received a standing ovation from Cowell and Cheryl following her performance of "Make You Feel My Love". In the following episode, Ferguson received another standing ovation from Dannii Minogue and Cheryl after singing "Candle in the Wind". In the final, she performed a duet with Christina Aguilera, performing Aguilera's hit single "Beautiful". Ferguson's winner's song was a cover of Duffy's "Distant Dreamer". She avoided the final showdown every week and finished second to Matt Cardle, making her the first female runner-up on The X Factor.

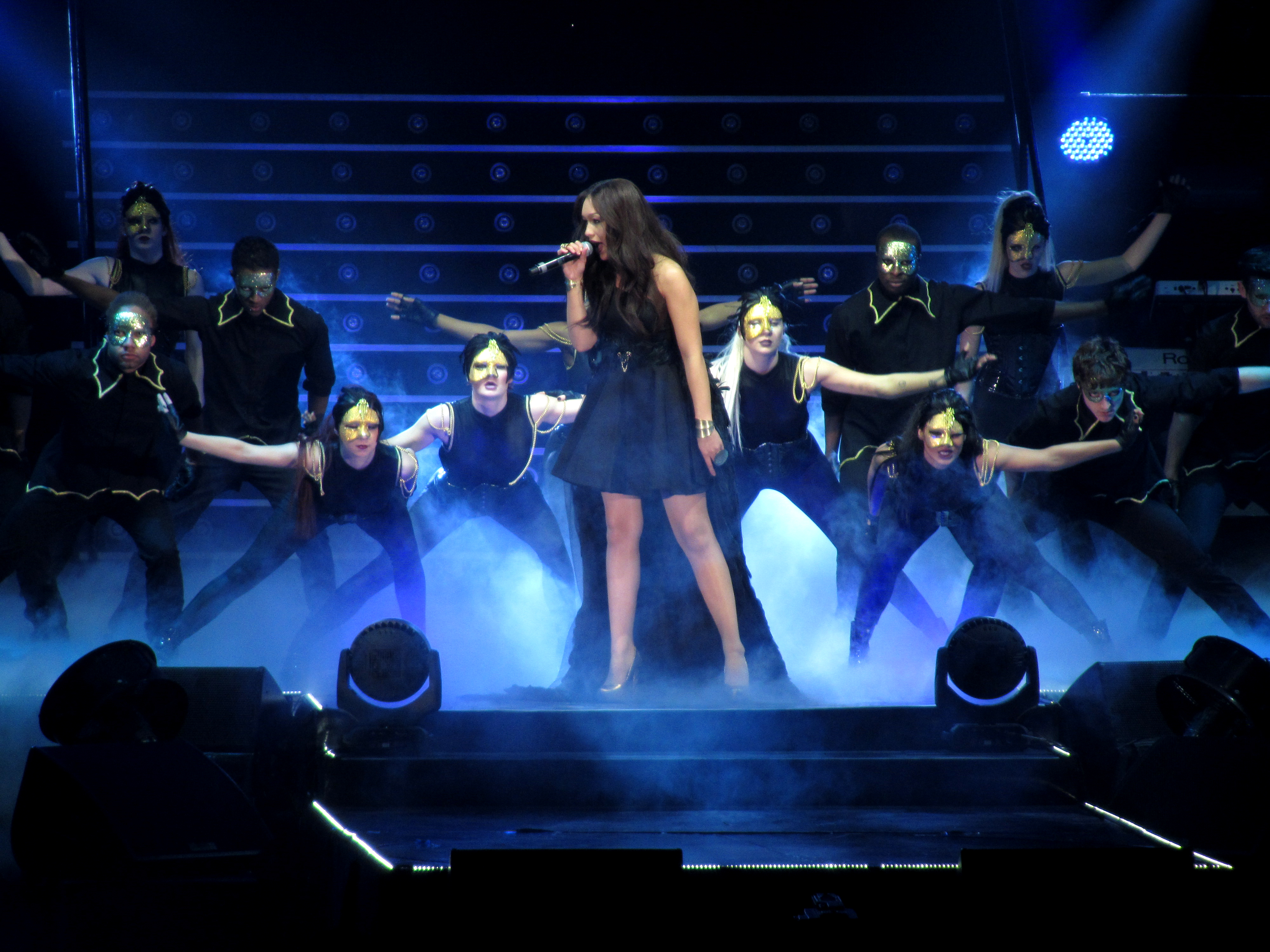
Ferguson performing on the X Factor Live Tour, April 2011. The tour saw Ferguson performing for 500,000 people throughout the UK.

After the finale, it was announced that Ferguson had been signed by Syco Music. In January 2011, it was reported that Ferguson had signed a joint record deal between Syco Records and Epic Records. Ferguson and nine other contestants from the series participated in the X Factor Live Tour from February to April 2011. The tour saw Ferguson performing for 500,000 people throughout the UK.

=== 2011–2012: Heaven ===
Ferguson released her debut single "Nothing's Real but Love" on 20 November 2011, which was written by Ferguson and Eg White. The single peaked at number ten on the UK Singles Chart. Her debut album Heaven followed and was released 5 December 2011 in the UK. The album features Ferguson collaborating with Eg White, Steve Booker, Fraser T Smith, Xenomania, Paul Barry, Mark Taylor and Brian Higgins. Ferguson later revealed that she would be co-writing the whole of her album for her to "connect" with the songs. The album would feature genres like Soul, Pop and Blues. The album was certified platinum for shipments of 300,000 units by the British Phonographic Industry in its first two weeks of release.

On 18 November 2011, Ferguson announced her first headlining UK and Ireland Tour, spanning 14 dates from 20 February to 13 March 2012. Due to high demand, Ferguson had to add more dates to her tour, all of which sold out. Ferguson confirmed on her official website that the second single to be released from the album will be "Too Good to Lose". The single was originally meant to be released on 26 February but later pushed back to 4 March. The official video premiered on Ferguson's website on 2 February. The single release was edited and shortened for radio. Ferguson performed "Endless Love" with Lionel Richie on an ITV1 special entitled This Is Lionel Richie. Starting in February 2012, an excerpt from Ferguson's "Nothing's Real but Love" was used in a television advertisement campaign for Nescafé Gold Blend coffee. "Glitter & Gold" was confirmed via Ferguson's official website to be the third single taken from the album which was released on 29 April 2012. In April 2012, Ferguson broke her left leg during a night out, which kept her wearing a cast for several weeks. During performances on Britain's Got Talent and Alan Carr: Chatty Man, she performed while sitting on a stool.

On 29 May 2012, Ferguson made her American television debut when she sang "Nothing's Real but Love" on The Today Show. She also performed the song on The View. On 13 July, Ferguson revealed via Twitter that she would be taking her management team to court, after they made her work until she collapsed. The relationship deteriorated further in September 2012 with the former management company filing a High Court writ, asking for a declaration that the star unlawfully ended her contract and seeking 20% of her future earnings.

In an interview in March 2012, Ferguson stated that she expected to release her second studio album in 2014, that she would start writing the album in 2013 once promotion for Heaven had finished, and that she expected to take a more up-beat approach to the album. On 23 August 2012, Ferguson announced she would release a deluxe version of Heaven on 15 October 2012, and she would also release her fourth single "Backtrack" the day before. Ferguson performed Backtrack on the second The X Factor results show on 14 October. On 16 September, Ferguson released an EP of live tracks from the 2012 iTunes Festival, which featured five tracks including "Nothing's Real but Love". During an interview with Chart Show TV, Ferguson confirmed that "Shoulder to Shoulder" would be released on 9 December 2012 as the final single from Heaven before starting work on her second studio album. Ferguson performed the single on Chatty Man on 14 December. However, "Teach Me How to Be Loved" was released as the album's final single in Germany. Ferguson features on the charity record He Ain't Heavy, He's My Brother including other singers such as Paloma Faith, Paul McCartney and Robbie Williams. The single was to raise money for various charities associated with the Hillsborough disaster. The song achieved Christmas Number 1 in the UK.

=== 2012–2015: Freedom and Lady Sings the Blues ===
In October 2012, Ferguson stated she would embark on a US tour in January 2013 and that she had already begun writing new material for her second album. On 29 November 2012, Ferguson confirmed her plans to tour in the US and said she would release her second album late next year, stating, "I'm going back to touring the US more early in the new year and then I am getting stuck into writing the new album which should be out later in 2013 or 2014."

She began work on her second studio album on 18 February 2013 after a month hiatus and completed the album in mid-August. In July 2013, Ferguson revealed she was in the stages of finishing up her second album, also saying that it "has been hard to make" and that she was writing about her babies. On 22 August 2013 she revealed on Facebook that her new album would be called Freedom and would be released on 2 December 2013 along with putting up pre-order links to the album.

The lead single, "I Hope", was uploaded to Ferguson's YouTube channel on 12 October 2013 and was released on 1 December 2013, entering the UK singles chart at number 15; in mainland Europe "Light On" was released as the lead single from the album. Freedom was released the following day and entered the charts at number 6 and has since been certified Gold by the BPI. Freedom was met with generally positive reviews from critics. The album includes a duet with US soul star John Legend and production/songwriting from Jarrad Rogers, Toby Gad and Eg White.

On 7 August 2014 Ferguson tweeted that she was back in the studio confirming the work of a third studio album stating "amazing day at the studio working with the same musicians that Frank Sinatra used and so many other greats feeling very blessed". On 13 January 2015 Ferguson revealed the album title, artwork and release date via her Vevo channel. Lady Sings the Blues was released on 9 March 2015 via RCA Records. The album charted at number 7 on the UK Albums Chart.

=== 2015–2016: Superwoman ===
On 9 May 2015 Ferguson performed at VE Day 70: A Party to Remember in Horse Guards Parade, London. On 4 October 2015 Ferguson confirmed the creation of a new studio album by posting on Twitter that she is "busy recording" and "the next album sounds good already". The first single from the album was announced on 30 August and was called "Bones", a cover of a 2013 track by NZ artist Ginny Blackmore, and was released on 2 September 2016. The album "Superwoman" was released on 7 October. Ferguson toured from 23 October to 15 November across the UK.

In December 2016 she was on Fern Britton Meets. In the interview Ferguson revealed how her Christian faith got her through troubled times, both on The X Factor and in the years that followed.

On 21 April 2017, she announced that she was working on her fifth studio album. On 2 October of that year she announced through her Facebook page that she was no longer with her management company but was working on new projects and touring in 2018. She released the first single "Uncrazy" from the album on 1 December 2017, a dance song, which moves away from Ferguson's usual style of music.

=== 2020–present: Heaven Part II and semi retirement ===
On 8 May 2020, a single titled "Nothing Left but Family" featuring Nile Rodgers was released. In a series of live videos on social media, Ferguson confirmed that the next album would be released the end of 2022 or early 2023 and is being produced by producer Nile Rodgers. On 25 November 2021, via her Twitter account, Ferguson confirmed her fifth studio album to be released in 2023 would be her final one, and that she would be retiring from the music industry following the release. On 11 February 2022, Ferguson premiered the track "I'm Going to Love You" on BBC Concert Orchestra, thought to be the lead single from her final studio album.

On 6 June 2023, Ferguson confirmed that her fifth studio album, Heaven Part II, will be released in December. She performed in her hometown at the Philharmonic Hall, Liverpool, on 18 November 2023, just weeks before the album's release. On 6 November, Ferguson announced her nationwide tour in support of the album which began in April 2024. On 19 February 2025 Ferguson announced her Tour 15 Years Stripped Back a string of intimate acoustic shows across the UK.

== Personal life ==
Ferguson met the father to her two oldest children, Karl Dures, on holiday in Tenerife. Ferguson and Dures dated for four years and had two children. She also has a daughter, born in 2014, from a later relationship.

On 1 January 2022 Ferguson confirmed her engagement to her partner of seven years Jonny Hughes. They married in December 2022. On 17 February 2023, Ferguson revealed she had given birth to her fourth child.

Ferguson previously dated fellow The X Factor contestant and former One Direction member Zayn Malik. The relationship ended after four months together, in July 2011. Ferguson addressed the media interest, saying: "When I was in a relationship with Zayn it was quite hard, but it comes with it. Me and Zayn just grew apart. I wish him all the best."

Ferguson was appointed Member of the Order of the British Empire (MBE) in the 2024 Birthday Honours for services to the music industry.

== Musical style and influences ==
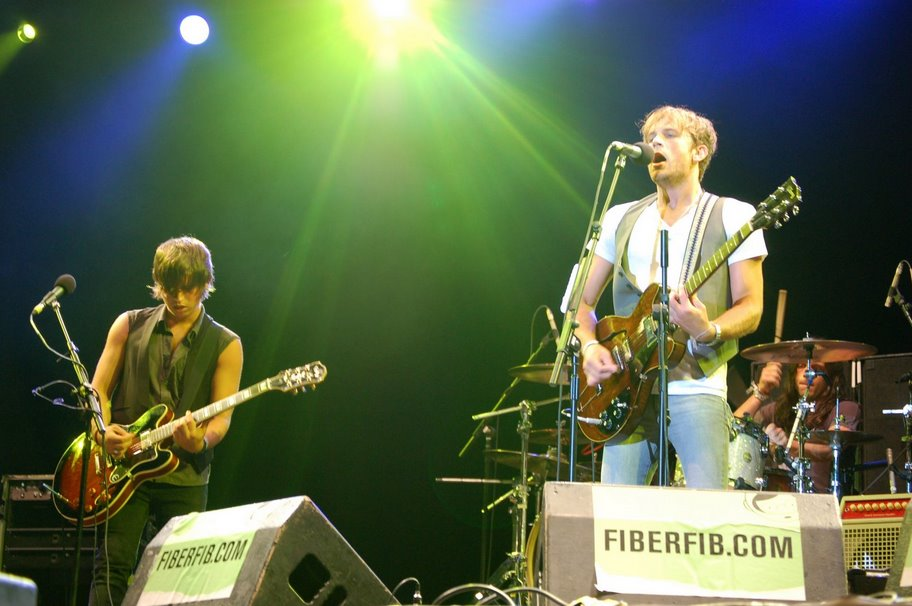
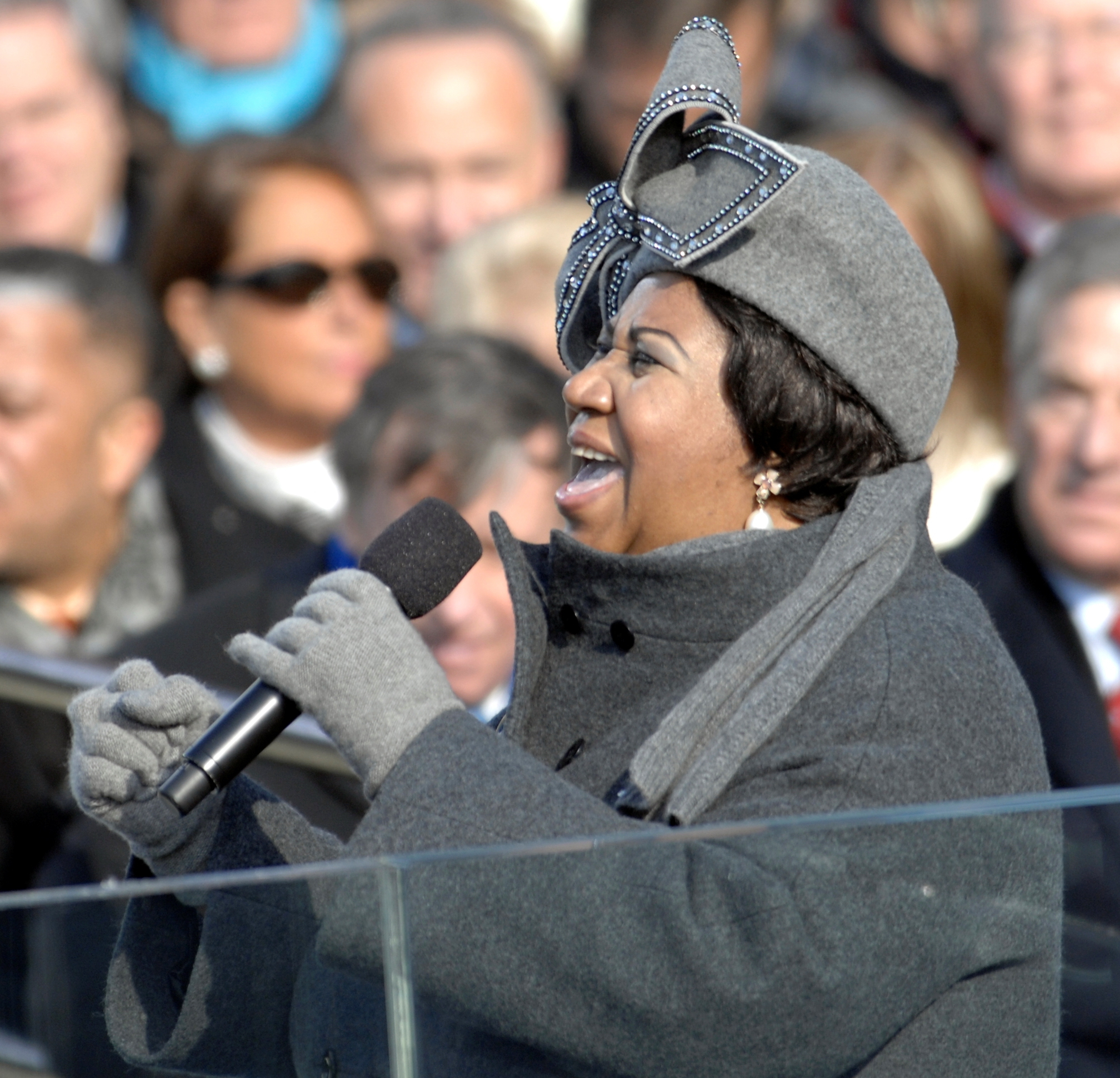
Kings of Leon (left) and Aretha Franklin (right) are two of the musical acts Ferguson draws inspiration from.

Ferguson's first album is of the soul, pop, blues and R&B genres, with lyrics describing heartbreak and relationships. The album's music was compared to work by Aretha Franklin and Macy Gray. On describing her own sound she said, "quite soulful, I don't know what you compare it to. I’m just me."

Ferguson cites Aretha Franklin as one of the artists who had the biggest influence on her. She revealed how she wished to have collaborated with Franklin on her debut album. She cites band Kings of Leon as an inspiration. On the question of collaborating with Kings of Leon she said, "I’d like to see what happened. I just think it would be cool, I love them as musicians and they play really well so I’d love to just write with them maybe...I’m dreaming here but you never know, I could rock out with the Kings of Leon." Ferguson also cites the late soul singer Amy Winehouse as one of her biggest influences, stating that she respected Winehouse as "she was real and wasn't in it for the fame, she was artistic and her music is lovely." She also cites Sam Cooke, Otis Redding and Nina Simone among her influences.

== Other ventures ==
Ferguson became the new face of Walkers crisps Sunbites as of June 2011. She starred in an ad that appeared online, on social media and TV. It became Ferguson's first ad as part of the campaign. Ferguson also opened a beauty salon in Liverpool – Rebecca's Beauty Boudoir – in 2013, but she closed the business in 2015.

Since 2017, Ferguson has been making guest appearances on ITV's Loose Women. Her latest appearance was in April 2019.

== Discography ==
Albums

- Heaven (2011)
- Freedom (2013)
- Lady Sings the Blues (2015)
- Superwoman (2016)
- Heaven Part II (2023)

== Tours ==
- The X Factor Live Tour (2011)
- Heaven Tour (2012)
- US Tour (2013)
- Freedom Tour (2014)
- Lady Sings the Blues Tour (2015)
- Superwoman Tour (2016)
- Revolution Tour (2018)
- Heaven Part II Tour (2024)
- 15 Years Stripped Back (2025)
- The Hits at Christmas Tour (2026)

== Awards and nominations ==
Year	Association	Category	Nominated work	Result
2012	Glamour Women of the Year Awards	UK Musician/Solo Artist	Herself	Nominated
2012	MOBO Awards	Best Female	Herself	Nominated
2012	MOBO Awards	Best R&B/Soul Act	Herself	Nominated
2012	MTV Europe Music Awards	Best Push	Herself	Nominated
2012	Soul Train Music Awards	Best International Performance	"Nothing's Real but Love"	Nominated
