= Union J discography =

- Studio albums: 3
- EPs: 1
- Singles: 8
- Music videos: 9

The discography of English boy band Union J consists of three studio albums, five singles and six music videos. Union J first announced that they had signed a record deal with Sony Music Entertainment at a performance in Cardiff, Wales on 15 December 2012. Their debut single "Carry You" was recorded in London in January 2013 and was released in June 2013, charting at number six in the United Kingdom. On 28 January, it was confirmed that the subsidiary label that Union J had signed with was RCA Records. In June 2013, it was announced that the band would embark on their first UK headline tour, the Magazines and TV Screens Tour, which consists of 18 dates in December 2013 and January 2014. Their second single, "Beautiful Life", was released on 21 October and debuted at number 8. The following week saw the release of their self-titled debut album, Union J. On 5 November 2013, they announced that their third single would be "Loving You Is Easy".

In 2014, Union J left RCA and signed with Epic Records. "Tonight (We Live Forever)", the lead single from their second album, was released on 17 August 2014. This was followed up by "You Got It All", written by Magic!'s Nasri, released in November 2014. Although it was the most purchased single of the week, audio streaming of Ed Sheeran's "Thinking Out Loud" prevented it from reaching the number one spot. Their second album, You Got It All – The Album, reached number 28 on the UK Albums Chart.

In December 2022, Union J released their third studio album, Ten, to celebrate ten years since their formation. The album includes previously released singles "Alive" and "Dancing".

== Albums ==
Title	Details	Peak chart positions			Sales	Certifications
Title	Details	UK	IRE	SCO	Sales	Certifications
Union J	Released: 28 October 2013; Label: Syco, RCA; Format: CD, digital download	6	8	5	UK: 60,000+	BPI: Silver
You Got It All – The Album	Released: 8 December 2014; Label: Syco, Epic; Format: CD, digital download	28	57	26		
Ten	Released: 23 December 2022; Label: R U Listening; Format: Digital download; streaming	—	—	—		

== Extended plays ==
Title	Details
Who Would've Thought	Released: 12 July 2019; Format: Digital download

== Singles ==
Single	Year	Peak chart positions			Certifications	Album
Single	Year	UK	IRE	SCO	Certifications	Album
"Carry You"	2013	6	12	4	BPI: Silver	Union J
"Beautiful Life"	2013	8	19	7		Union J
"Loving You Is Easy"	2013	196	—	—		Union J
"Tonight (We Live Forever)"	2014	9	45	7		You Got It All – The Album
"You Got It All"	2014	2	64	2		You Got It All – The Album
"Alive"	2018	166	—	—		Who Would've Thought
"Dancing" (featuring Ironik)	2018	—	—	—		Who Would've Thought
"Paralysed"	2019	—	—	—		Who Would've Thought
"—" denotes a single that did not chart or was not released in that territory.

== Music videos ==
List of videos, showing year released and director
Title	Year	Director(s)
"Carry You"	2013	Sarah Chatfield
"Carry You in Kick-Ass 2"	2013	
"Beautiful Life"	2013	Naroop
"Loving You Is Easy"	2013	Carly Cussen
"Tonight (We Live Forever)"	2014	Director X
"You Got It All"	2014	Frank Borin
"Alive"	2018	Jedd Roberts
"Dancing" (Featuring Ironik)	2018	Jedd Roberts
"Paralysed"	2019	Askaris & Sean Russell for RU Listening Ltd
