= Pink Angels =

Pink Angels may refer to:

- 5Angels, a former Czech girl group
- The Pink Angels Anti-Violence Project, a former neighborhood watch organization in Chicago, US
