= You Got It All (disambiguation) =

You Got It All is a 1986 song by The Jets.

You Got It All may also refer to:

- "You Got It All" (Union J song), 2014
  - You Got It All (album), 2014 album by Union J which includes the song
