= Magazines + TV Screens Tour =

2013–14 concert tour by Union J

Magazines and TV Screens Tour
- Tour by Union J
- Associated album: Union J
- Start date: December 14, 2013
- End date: April 6, 2014
- Legs: 1
- No. of shows: 19 in United Kingdom; 1 in Ireland; 1 in Portugal; Total 21

The Magazines and TV Screens Tour (stylised as Magazine + TV Screens Tour) is a concert tour by Union J in support of their solo debut studio album Union J. The tour will be their first headlining tour in the United Kingdom, Ireland and Portugal.

== Background ==
On 11 June 2013, Union J announced that they would be touring the United Kingdom and Ireland in support of their debut album, Union J. When asked about the tour, the band stated:

"The thing we love most about music is performing and we are so excited to get out on the road for our first ever tour. Playing our album to fans will be brilliant. We are so excited and promise to put on a really special show."

Tickets went on sale on 14 June 2013. The band added an extra date to Belfast on the tour.

== Opening acts ==
- Room 94
- 5Angels
- Elyar Fox
- Ollie Marland
- Nagiiba Georgiou Abdulah
- D8 (X-Factor Portugal finalist)
- NO STRESS (Portuguese Band)

== Set List ==
- Where Are You Now
- Beethoven
- Head In The Clouds
- Wild Ones/Roar (Katy Perry and Flo Rida cover) (George's Solo)
- Carry You
- Save The Last Dance
- Lucky Ones
- Listen (Beyoncé cover) (Jaymi's Solo)
- Skyscraper (Demi Lovato cover)
- Amaze Me
- Counting Stars (OneRepublic cover) (JJ's Solo)
- I Knew You Were Trouble/We Are Never Ever Getting Back Together/22/Love Story/Everything Has Changed (Taylor Swift cover)
- Beneath Your Beautiful (Labrinth cover) (Josh's Solo)
- Beautiful Life
- Last Goodbye

Encore:

- Loving You Is Easy

http://www.setlist.fm/setlist/union-j/2013/new-theatre-oxford-england-4bc5bbb2.html

== Tour dates ==
Date	City	Country	Venue	Opening acts
14 December 2013	Oxford	United Kingdom	New Theatre Oxford	Elyar Fox; Ollie Marland; 5Angels
15 December 2013	Cardiff	United Kingdom	Motorpoint Arena Cardiff	Elyar Fox; Ollie Marland; 5Angels
16 December 2013	Sheffield	United Kingdom	Sheffield City Hall	Elyar Fox; Ollie Marland; 5Angels
18 December 2013	Plymouth	United Kingdom	Plymouth Pavilions	Elyar Fox; Ollie Marland; 5Angels
19 December 2013	Brighton	United Kingdom	Brighton Centre	Elyar Fox; Ollie Marland; 5Angels
21 December 2013	Manchester	United Kingdom	O2 Apollo Manchester	Elyar Fox; Ollie Marland; 5Angels
22 December 2013	Bournemouth	United Kingdom	Bournemouth International Centre	Elyar Fox; Ollie Marland; 5Angels
23 December 2013^{[A]}	London	United Kingdom	Hammersmith Apollo	Elyar Fox; Ollie Marland; 5Angels
28 December 2013	Newcastle	United Kingdom	Newcastle City Hall	Elyar Fox; Ollie Marland; 5Angels
29 December 2013	Nottingham	United Kingdom	Nottingham Royal Concert Hall	Elyar Fox; Ollie Marland; 5Angels
30 December 2013	Manchester	United Kingdom	O2 Apollo Manchester	Elyar Fox; Ollie Marland; 5Angels
3 January 2014	Ipswich	United Kingdom	Regent Theatre	Elyar Fox; Ollie Marland; 5Angels
5 January 2014	Bristol	United Kingdom	Colston Hall	Elyar Fox; Ollie Marland; 5Angels
6 January 2014	Liverpool	United Kingdom	Echo Arena Liverpool	Elyar Fox; Ollie Marland; 5Angels
7 January 2014	Glasgow	United Kingdom	Clyde Auditorium	Elyar Fox; Ollie Marland; 5Angels
9 January 2014	Blackpool	United Kingdom	Blackpool Opera House	Elyar Fox; Ollie Marland; 5Angels
10 January 2014	Birmingham	United Kingdom	National Indoor Arena	Elyar Fox; Ollie Marland; 5Angels
12 January 2014	Belfast	United Kingdom	Waterfront Hall	Elyar Fox; Ollie Marland; 5Angels
13 January 2014	Belfast	United Kingdom	Waterfront Hall	Elyar Fox; Ollie Marland; 5Angels
14 January 2014	Dublin	Ireland	The O2	Elyar Fox; Ollie Marland; 5Angels
6 April 2014	Lisbon	Portugal	MEO Arena	D8; No Stress; Emblem3

^{[A]}Matinée and evening shows
