= Street Love (disambiguation) =

Street Love is an album by Lloyd

Street Love may also refer to:

- Street Love (song)
- "Street Love", song by Biffy Clyro 2010
- "Streetlove", song by Lloyd
- "Street Love", song by Olamide
- Scarred (film), a 1984 American film also known as Street Love
