= Rough Copy =

UK musical group

- Origin: Croydon, London, England
- Genres: R&B, soul
- Years active: 2008–2016
- Labels: Epic (2014), EMC Records (2015–), DeeVu Records (2016)
- Members: Kazeem Ajobe; Joey Thomas; Sterling Ramsey
- Website: www.roughcopyofficial.com

Rough Copy were a British boy band from Croydon, London. The group consists of Kazeem Ajobo, Sterling Ramsey and Joseph James Thomas. They were the ninth contestant eliminated on the tenth series of The X Factor in 2013. They originally auditioned for the ninth series in 2012 and got to the "judges' houses" stage, but were forced to back out as Nigerian-born Ajobo was unable to obtain a visa in time, which would have made it almost impossible for him to re-enter the UK.

In 2014, Rough Copy signed a record deal with Epic Records. They released their debut single "Street Love" on 29 June 2014, but were later dropped after the single failed to chart. The group later signed with EMC Records. Now signed to DeeVu Records the band's new single is due for release on 5 October 2016. The band failed to have a single make the UK music charts and consequently broke up in 2016.

== History ==
=== 2008–12: Formation and early career ===
Rough Copy were formed in 2008 and were originally called SOS (Sons of Soul), whose original members were Kazeem "Kaz" Ajobe, Joey Thomas, Rickstar Rickell Brown and Sterling Ramsey. After Brown left the group Ajobe, Thomas and Ramsey stayed together as a three-piece and renamed themselves to Rough Copy. Ajobe admitted that it was his girlfriend who convinced him to put the band together. He told Heat Magazine, "We've been together for eight years and I really want to marry her, but I need the money first. I owe my life to my girlfriend. She's the one that encouraged me to start the band – she suggested it." Rough Copy describe their style as "sweet but street". In October 2012, they released a mixtape called Sweet But Street.

=== 2012–13: The X Factor ===
In 2012, Rough Copy auditioned for the ninth series of The X Factor. They sang "Use Somebody" by Kings of Leon and a standing ovation from the audience and all four judges. After getting four "yeses", they progressed through to "bootcamp", where they were chosen for "judges' houses" with Louis Walsh as their mentor. However, before flying out to Las Vegas, Rough Copy were forced to leave the show as Ajobe, who was born in Nigeria, would have difficulty getting back into the UK. He had applied for a visa which would allow him to travel to Las Vegas and then return to the UK, but it would not be processed in time. As a result, they were replaced at judges' houses by Triple J (renamed Union J) and Times Red.

Rough Copy re-auditioned for the following series and sang "Do It Like a Dude" in their room audition and "Little Things" in the arena. After getting to bootcamp, it became apparent that Ajobe, yet again, was unable to obtain a visa in time for judges' houses, so Ramsey and James decided to continue on without him. They performed "Stop Crying Your Heart Out" at bootcamp and "Boyfriend" and "I Can't Make You Love Me" at judges' houses. After putting them through, their mentor Gary Barlow said he would do whatever he could to get Ajobe back into the band, and they reunited as a trio for the live shows.

Following the eliminations of Miss Dynamix in week 3 and Kingsland Road in week 4, Rough Copy were the last group left in the competition. In week 7, they were in the bottom two with Hannah Barrett, but were sent through to the quarter-final when only Nicole Scherzinger, Barrett's mentor, voted to send them home. However voting statistics confirmed that Barrett received more votes than Rough Copy meaning if Osbourne or Walsh voted to send Barrett through to the quarter-final or if the result went to deadlock, Barrett would've advanced to the quarter-final and Rough Copy would've been eliminated. In the semi-final, Rough Copy were in the final showdown with Luke Friend and were eliminated after the result went to deadlock. Although James and Ramsey also took part in the X Factor 2014 live tour, Ajobe was kicked off following a 'backstage incident' with fellow contestant Sam Callahan.

=== 2014–16: Record deal, "Street Love" and Break up ===
On 21 April 2014, Rough Copy announced that they had signed a record deal with Sony Music subsidiary Epic Records. They also announced that their debut single "Street Love", a reworking of Anita Baker's 1986 hit single "Sweet Love", would be released on 29 June 2014.

The group was subsequently dropped from their record label when their debut single "Street Love" failed to make the top 100. Later signing with EMC Records, they released their second single "Same Formula" on 17 May 2015, but this also failed to chart.

The band broke up in late 2016.

== Discography ==
| Year | Single | Peak chart positions |
| Year | Single | UK R&B |
|---|---|---|
| 2014 | "Street Love" | 29 |
| 2015 | "Same Formula" | |
| 2016 | "UK" | |

== Videography ==
List of music videos and year released
| Title | Production | Year |
|---|---|---|
| “Street Love” | - | 2014 |
| “3 Words” | - | 2015 |
| “Same Formula” (Lyric Video) | | 2015 |
| “Same Formula” | - | 2015 |
| “Our Love” | - | 2015 |

Cover Sundays series showing year released, and YouTube views
| Title | Production | Year | YouTube views |
|---|---|---|---|
| “One Direction - Little Things” (Cover) | Producer: | 2015 | 186K |
| “Justin Bieber - Boyfriend” (Cover) | Producer: | 2015 | 108K |
| “Rihanna - Diamonds” (Cover) | Producer: | 2015 | 162K |

== Members ==
Joey James (born Joseph James Thomas; 1987) was the oldest member of the group. He previously worked as a Michael Jackson lookalike and held several paper rounds in his local area.

Sterling "Boob" Ramsey (born 1988) previously worked as a crane operator for some of the largest ports in the UK.

Kazeem "Baz" Ajobo (born 1989 in Nigeria) was the youngest member of the group. He previously worked as a dog and cat therapist, specialising in depression.
