= Diamond Cats =

Czech girl group

- Origin: Czech Republic
- Genres: Pop
- Years active: 2009–2014
- Spinoff of: 5Angels
- Past members: Nikol Šneiderová; Kristýna Pecková; Hana Hladíková; Kristýna Šlingrová

Diamond Cats were a Czech girl group founded in September 2009. They consisted of Nikol Šneiderová, Kristýna Pecková, Hana Hladíková, and Kristýna Šlingrová, all aged 9–11 at the time of the group's inception.

== History ==
The band was formed in September 2009, when its members left the girl group 5Angels after an internal conflict.

Diamond Cats' first live performance took place in September 2009, at the "First School Bell" event in Plzeň. Their debut single was titled "One, Two Step". In 2010, they released the album Showbyznys, whose title song went on to become their best-known hit. The accompanying YouTube video was viewed over 200,000 times in two months. In the following years, Diamond Cats issued two more albums, Deja vu (2011) and Na dlani (2012).

After Hladíková left the group, at the end of 2013, the remaining members decided not to continue without her.

== Song themes and management ==
Diamond Cats' songs were mainly themed around friendship, love, fashion, and regrets over people's misfortunes. Musically, the band was led by Nikol Davídková, who wrote and produced their songs and acted as their singing instructor. Choreographically, the band members were trained at Yemi A.D.'s Dance Academy Prague.

== Endorsements ==
Diamond Cats were several times asked to be the face of Hasbro's Littlest Pet Shop franchise. As part of its promotion, in 2011, they gave a concert at the toy fair held at the PVA Expo Praha exhibition center.

== Discography ==
Studio albums

- Showbyznys (2010)
- Na dlani (2012)

EPs

- Deja vu (2011)

Video albums

- Karaoke DVD (2011)
