= Beautiful Life (Union J song) =

Single by Union J

from the album Union J
- Released: 21 October 2013
- Recorded: 2013
- Genre: Pop
- Length: 4:03
- Label: Syco; RCA
- Songwriters: Jon Maguire; Jon Lilygreen; Jo Perry; Jo Lawrence; Blair Dreelan

Union J singles chronology
"Carry You" (2013)	"Beautiful Life" (2013)	"Loving You Is Easy" (2013)

"Beautiful Life" is a song by British boy band Union J. It was released as on 21 October 2013 as the second single from their debut studio album, Union J (2013).

== Background ==
On 3 September 2013, Union J announced via Twitter the name of their next single would be "Beautiful Life" and will be released on 21 October: "THE WAIT IS OVER! Our brand new single is called 'Beautiful Life' and is released on 21st Oct #UnionJBeautifulLife". George Shelley said: "Single 2 is called Beautiful Life, and its my favourite song in the world. Means so much to me, and you'll love it!" The group also commented on the track: "The guitar is back!", and Josh Cuthbert described it as a "mid-tempo song" that "builds throughout". The single officially debuted on 9 September.

== Music video ==
On 4 September 2013, it was reported the band were filming the music video for their new single. In late September, 4Music revealed a behind-the-scenes of the video for "Beautiful Life". The video was filmed in London at a shipping dock as the song progresses young people emerge from the crates and join Union J. The music video officially premiered on 16 September 2013.

== Critical reception ==
Roberts Copsey of Digital Spy gave the song three out of five stars, saying: "As such, Union J's latest single 'Beautiful Life', which encourages people to live life to the fullest – including one insecure girl who lives a 'broken dream' and spades on the make-up 'to cover up an empty space' – feels a touch on the dated side. The jaunty guitar riff, singalong lyrics and arms-aloft chorus are all present and correct, but what is sorely lacking is a dose of youthful charm."

== Track listing ==
Digital download
No.	Title	Length
1.	"Beautiful Life"	4:03
2.	"Beautiful Life" (Acoustic)	4:01

Other Versions

- 7th Heaven Club Mix – 6:28

== Charts ==
Chart (2013)	Peak position
Ireland (IRMA)	19
Scotland Singles (OCC)	7
UK Singles (OCC)	8

== Release history ==
Region	Date	Format	Label
Indonesia	27 September 2013	Digital download	Sony Music
Australia	18 October 2013	Digital download	RCA Records, Sony Music
Ireland	18 October 2013	Digital download	RCA Records, Sony Music
New Zealand	18 October 2013	Digital download	RCA Records, Sony Music
United Kingdom	18 October 2013	Digital download	RCA Records, Sony Music
