= 5Angels =

Czech girl group

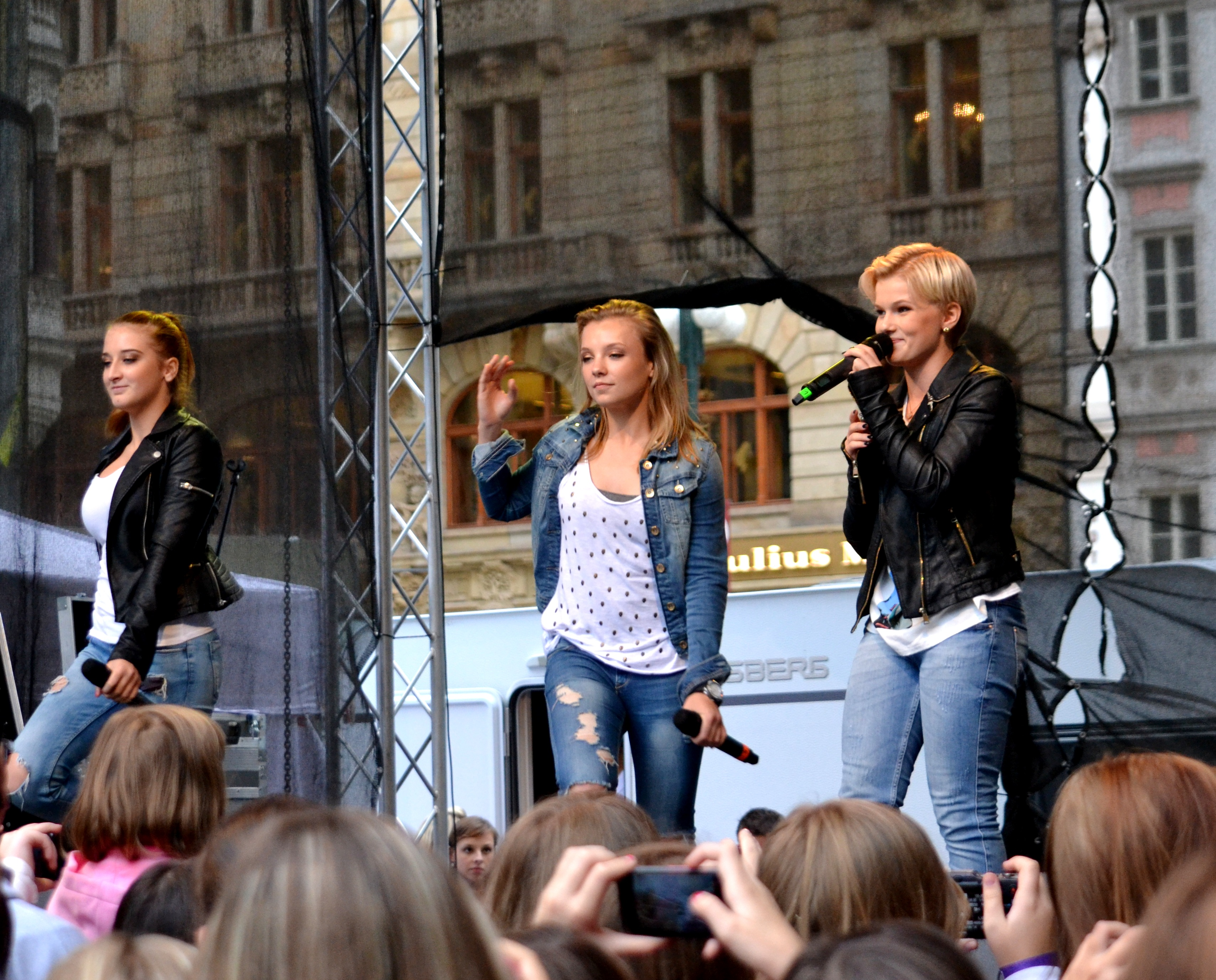
- 5Angels performing in 2014

Background information
- Also known as: Pink Angels
- Origin: Prague, Czech Republic
- Genre: Pop
- Years active: 2007–2017
- Spinoffs: Diamond Cats
- Past members: Nikola Mertlová; Angelina Šesťáková; Tereza Haklová; Natálie Skotnická; Veronika Spurná; Václava Vošmiková; Michaela Exlová; Kristýna Šlingrová; Kristýna Pecková; Nikol Šneiderová; Hana Hladíková; Diana Kahleová; Tereza Procházková

5Angels (Pink Angels in 2016–2017) were a girl group from Prague, Czech Republic, formed in 2007. By the time they broke up, in 2017, the group had released four studio albums, including one international release; two EPs; one live album; a collaboration album; two video albums; as well as a number of singles.

== History ==
5Angels was formed in late 2007 by one of the girls' father, Michal Mertl. The members were chosen from among students of the dance studio AT Studio Domino in Prague in a competition. The original lineup consisted of Kristýna Šlingrová, Nikol Šneiderová, Kristýna Pecková, Nikola Mertlová, and Tereza Procházková. Procházková left the group in early 2008 and was replaced by Diana Kahleová. A more radical change in the group happened in 2009, when Kahleová was replaced by Hana Hladíková, and soon after that, Šlingrová, Šneiderová, Pecková, and Hladíková left. Their departure was shrouded in a hostile atmosphere, and there were reports that the group had broken up. In September, the four had formed their own group, Diamond Cats. 5Angels continued, however, with the sole original remaining member being Mertl's daughter, Nikola. Four new members were recruited: Angelina Šestáková, Michaela Exlová, Tereza Haklová, and Václava Vošmiková. Exlová was replaced by Veronika Spurná in June 2013, and Natálie Skotnická took Vošmiková's place in 2015.

The group performed on numerous television shows in the Czech Republic and Slovakia, including on the Czech version of X-Factor, in 2008. In September 2013, 5Angels were special guests on the CBBC show Blue Peter, where they performed their song "World Domination". They also played at AllStarz Summer Party and Sundown Festival. "World Domination" was released as the band's first UK single in December of that year.

5Angels supported the boy band Union J on their 2013/14 winter tour. They were signed and managed in the UK by record producer Denis Ingoldsby of Amber Entertainment, who had previously worked with Girls Aloud, Blazin' Squad, and Eternal.

On 27 June 2014, they were set to perform at the Pop Across the Mersey! music festival, sharing the Echo Arena stage with Backstreet Boys, Blue, and Kian Egan, though the festival was ultimately cancelled.

In 2017, a year after a final lineup change and rebranding as Pink Angels, the group broke up.

== Band members ==
- Nikola Mertlová (Nikki)
- Angelina Šestáková (Angee)
- Tereza Haklová
- Natálie Skotnická
- Veronika Spurná
- Václava Vošmiková (Wendy)
- Michaela Exlová (Míša)
- Kristýna Šlingrová (Týna)
- Kristýna Pecková
- Nikol Šneiderová (Niki)
- Hana Hladíková
- Diana Kahleová
- Tereza Procházková

== Discography ==
Studio albums

Title	Album details
5angels	Released: 23 October or 15 November 2008; Label: Mista / EMI Publishing Belgium; Formats: CD
Krásnej den	Released: 20 October 2010; Label: Mista / EMI Publishing Benelux; Formats: CD
Na dosah	Released: 1 November 2011; Label: Mista / EMI Publishing Benelux; Formats: CD, digital download, streaming
World Domination	Released: 8 December 2014; Label: BrainZone; Formats: CD, digital download, streaming

Live albums

Title	Album details
Live!	Released: late 2009; Label: Mista / EMI Publishing Belgium; Formats: CD

Spoken-word albums

Title	Album details
Tajný deník	Released: 2011; Label: Mista / EMI Publishing Benelux; Formats: CD

Collaboration albums

Title	Album details
Andílci za školou (musical)	Released: 3 December 2012; Label: Popron Music & Publishing; Formats: CD

Singles

- "World Domination" (2013)
- "Kiss and Tell" (2014)
- "Long Lost Weekend" (2015)
- "Běž dál" (2016)

Other songs

- "Už znáš svět Winx" (ending theme for the third season of Winx Club)
- "Objevíš náš svět Winx" ("Under the Sign of Winx")

=== As Pink Angels ===
EPs

- Slay Mama (Remixes) (2016)
- Mamma Don't Lie (Remixes) (2017)

Singles

- "Slay Mama" (2016)
- "Falling Again" (2016)
- "Mamma Don't Lie" (2017)

== Videography ==
Video albums

Title	Album details
5angels (a.k.a. "Debutové DVD")	Released: 2008; Label: Československá Muzika; Formats: DVD
Karaoke DVD	Released: 2010; Label: Mista / EMI Publishing Benelux; Formats: DVD
Karaoke DVD 2	Released: 1 March 2011; Label: Mista / EMI Publishing Benelux; Formats: DVD

Music videos

- "Čarodějky" (2008)
- "Ples démonů" (2008)
- "Táto, noc, nečeká!" (2009)
- "4 World Domination" (2010)
- "Pusa tě láká" (2012)
- "Pár dnů lásky" (2013)
- "World Domination" (2013)
- "Kiss and Tell" (2014)
- "Long Lost Weekend" (2015)
- "Běž dál" (2016)
- "Slay Mama" (2016)
- "Mamma Don't Lie" (2017)

== Bibliography ==
- Cool sešit (2012)
- Dívčí svět (2013)

== On screen and stage ==
=== Films ===
- Show! (2013)

=== Musicals ===
- Tajemství 5-ti andělů (2009)
- Andílci za školou (2012)
