= Carry You (Union J song) =

Single by Union J

from the album Union J
- Released: 2 June 2013
- Recorded: 2013
- Genre: Pop; dance-pop
- Length: 3:06
- Label: Syco; RCA; Sony
- Songwriters: Steve Mac; Claude Kelly

Union J singles chronology
"Carry You" (2013)	"Beautiful Life" (2013)

"Carry You" is the debut single by English boy band Union J. It was released in Ireland and the United Kingdom on 2 June 2013 as the lead single from their debut studio album, Union J (2013).

== Background ==
During a performance in Cardiff on 15 December 2012, Union J announced that they had signed a recording contract with Sony Music. It was later revealed, in January 2013, that the record label was that of sub-division, RCA Records. On 14 January, it was announced that Union J were in London recording their debut single that day, and on 8 April 2013, the group confirmed the title and release of their debut single, "Carry You". This was followed by the unveiling of the accompanying artwork, which also debuted the band's logo.

The track was given its radio premiere on 22 April, which was followed by the upload of an audio version of the single on the official Vevo account for Union J. Whilst explaining the meaning behind the single, band member Jaymi Hensley said, "The message of the song is [that] we've been on a massive rollercoaster the last year with each other, and it's about being there for each other." He also revealed, "It's there for the fans, we really wouldn't be here without them."

== Music videos ==
On 30 March 2013, Union J announced via their official Twitter account that the music video for the single had been filmed. An official teaser for the video was uploaded to the group's Vevo account on 26 April 2013. The full video first premiered through Capital TV on 29 April.

The video was filmed in Nottingham and includes the band shopping, skateboarding and performing a gig. George Shelley had to learn how to skateboard, while JJ Hamblett said he disliked having to ride a pink flowery bicycle, admitting he would "rather be on a horse."

In July 2013, a second video for the track was released, featuring scenes from Kick-Ass 2, which features the track. Clips of the music video were also featured in a scene of the film.

== Critical reception ==
Robert Copsey of Digital Spy gave the song a mixed review, while mentioning how Union J's constant comparisons to One Direction could hinder future success.

Union J's post-X Factor debut is a highly calculated exercise in muscling their way in without ruffling too many feathers. "Don't ever say you're lonely/ Just lay your problems on me" George Shelley insists over defiant piano and spacious synths, ahead of a cutesy chorus with a suitably niggling hook. The result achieves its objective, but in doing so, lacks the impact needed for survival.

== Live performances ==
The track was performed live for the first time at Futurehits Live 2013. Union J performed the song on Britain's Got More Talent on 30 May 2013. They also sang it at Capital FM's Summertime Ball at Wembley Stadium on 9 June 2013 and at Chester Rocks 2013 on 15 June.

== Track listing ==
Digital download

1. Carry You - 3:06
2. Carry You (Karaoke Version) - 3:06
3. Carry You (Steve Smart & WestFunk Remix) - 2:55
4. Carry You (Cutmore Remix) - 3:02

== Charts ==
=== Weekly charts ===
Chart (2013)	Peak position
Ireland (IRMA)	12
Scotland Singles (OCC)	4
Slovakia Airplay (ČNS IFPI)	46
UK Singles (OCC)	6

=== Year-end charts ===
Chart (2013)	Peak position
UK Singles (Official Charts Company)	173

== Certifications ==
Region	Certification	Certified units/sales
United Kingdom (BPI)	Silver	200,000^{‡}
^{‡} Sales+streaming figures based on certification alone.

== Release history ==
Region	Date	Format	Label
Indonesia	10 May 2013	Digital download	Sony Music
Ireland	2 June 2013	Digital download	RCA Records, Sony Music
United Kingdom	2 June 2013	Digital download	RCA Records, Sony Music
