= Pink Angels Anti-Violence Project =

Volunteer group in Chicago, formed 1991

The Pink Angels Anti-Violence Project, also called simply the Pink Angels, was a Chicago-based volunteer group which worked to prevent and report anti-LGBT hate crimes. The group was started in 1991 by Alyn Toler, who was inspired by a similar group, the New York City-based Guardian Angels. The group served as a reaction to increased homophobic hate crimes in the city and the inaction of police and other authorities to address the issue. By March 1992, the group held general membership meetings twice each month, and by April the group had about 50 members, 35 of whom were willing to patrol.

== Project ==
The Pink Angels taught self-defense tactics to their volunteers, as well as training them how to identify and report hate crimes. Unarmed volunteers patroled the streets on weekends, donning black berets, where they intervened in "a variety of violent situations - regardless of sexual orientation," such as sexual assaults and race-related hate crimes. The group's "predawn pink patrol" worked from midnight to 5 am. The group had both LGBT and straight volunteers, who came from a variety of racial backgrounds.

The group's work was praised by Sgt. Anthony J. Scalise, a member of the Chicago police department's civil rights section, who noted "they're not only doing a good job keeping the hate crimes down, they're seeing a lot of other things and passing the information along to us". Members of the Pink Angels reported feeling supported by police, and often remained in contact with dispatchers during their patrols.

One year before 1998, the Pink Angels were the fundraising recipient of the "Lesbian and Gay Pride Edition" of Chicago's annual Too Much Light Makes The Baby Go Blind theatre event.

== Disbandment ==
The group disbanded a few years after its founding, following Toler's death from AIDS complications.

== See also ==
- Guardian Angels
