= Street Love (song) =

Single by Rough Copy
- Released: 29 June 2014
- Recorded: 2014
- Genre: R&B, soul
- Length: 3:16
- Label: Epic
- Songwriters: Anita Baker, Louis A. Johnson, Gary Bias, Crush Boys, Tejai Moore
- Producers: hAZEL, Da Beatfreakz

"Street Love" is the debut single by British boy band Rough Copy. It was released through Epic Records on 29 June 2014. The song, produced by hAZEL and Da Beatfreakz, is a reworking of Anita Baker's 1986 hit single "Sweet Love". Whilst new verses were written by Crush Boys, the chorus from the original remains mostly the same. The initial idea to use a rework of Anita Baker's "Sweet Love" chorus on this track is where Singer-songwriter Tejai Moore came into play.

The song failed to chart on the UK Singles Chart, but peaked at number 29 on the UK R&B Chart.

== Background and composition ==
On 8 December 2013, Rough Copy finished fourth on the tenth series of The X Factor. On 21 April 2014, the group announced that they had signed a record deal with Sony Music subsidiary Epic Records. They also announced that their debut single "Street Love" would be released on 29 June 2014.

"Street Love" is a reworking of Anita Baker's 1986 hit single "Sweet Love". It was produced by hAZEL and Da Beatfreakz (Usher, Jason Derulo), whilst new verses were written by Crush Boys. In an interview with Singersroom.com, Crush Boys explained, "...we've had a long standing relationship with the platinum selling producers, Da Beatfreakz, for a while. With this particular record, they teamed up with a friend of ours named hAZEL to create a record tailored for Rough Copy. They (Da Beatfreakz) sent us the beat back with a vocal reference on the hook (Tejai Moore was the vocal reference) and asked us to do our thing with the verses. We finished the record in like an hour, sent it back, and a couple weeks later they called us back and said Rough Copy was interested in taking the record and potentially making it a single."

== Chart performance ==
The song failed to chart on the UK Singles Chart, although it did chart at number 29 on the UK R&B Chart.

== Music video ==
The music video was filmed in London. It was uploaded to YouTube on 12 May 2014 at a total of three minutes and twenty-eight seconds. It features Rough Copy walking around the streets serenading a woman.

== Charts ==
Chart (2014)	Peak position
UK Hip Hop/R&B (Official Charts)	29

== Release history ==
Region	Date	Format	Label
Ireland	27 June 2014	Digital download	Epic Records
United Kingdom	29 June 2014	Digital download	Epic Records
