= Union J (album) =

Studio album by Union J
- Released: 28 October 2013
- Recorded: 2013
- Genre: Pop
- Length: 35:31
- Labels: RCA; Syco
- Producers: Joseph Lawrence; Steve Mac; Tim Powell; Tom, Dick & Harry Productions; Ze Infidels

Union J chronology
Union J (2013)	You Got It All – The Album (2014)

Singles from Union J
- 1. "Carry You" Released: 2 June 2013; 2. "Beautiful Life" Released: 21 October 2013; 3. "Loving You Is Easy" Released: 4 December 2013

Union J is the self-titled debut studio album by English boy band Union J. It was released in the United Kingdom on 28 October 2013 through RCA Records, and debuted at number six on the UK Albums Chart.

"Carry You" was released as the album's first single in June 2013 and reached number-six in the United Kingdom, marking the group's first top ten track. In September 2013, the band confirmed their second single would be "Beautiful Life". It was released on 21 October, preceding the release of their debut studio-album by one week. The third single was "Loving You Is Easy" which charted at number 9 in Ireland, and charted in the lower regions of the UK Singles Chart.

Union J promoted the album by embarking on their first headlining tour, the Magazines + TV Screens Tour, throughout December 2013 and January 2014, in support of their first record release.

== Background and production ==
During a performance in Cardiff on 15 December 2012, Union J announced that they had signed a recording contract with Sony Music. On 28 January 2013, it was revealed that the record label was that of sub-division RCA Records and that the group would be releasing their debut single in June. On 14 January, it was announced that Union J were in London recording their debut single that day. On 12 January 2013, the band announced news of recording their debut single via Twitter: "Recording or first single on Monday! So sorry Belfast but we have to change the gig date, things are moving so fast for us! We'll be back! X". On 22 April, it was revealed that Union J's debut single "Carry You" would be released on 2 June.

On 5 June, the group revealed that their debut album was nearly finished, and were hoping to release it in either September or October. Speaking about the album, band member George Shelley revealed: "It all depends how well Carry You does because we've got loads of different sounds on our album at the moment that we’ve recorded. So if Carry You does well then we will do a second single that's sort of down that route and if it doesn’t do as well as we are hoping then we will do something a little different." The group later described their album as: "It's pop music but there's some stuff that people wouldn't expect. There's some funky summer vibes, some dance music, some ballads and a Californian vibe to it." On 4 September 2013, the album's artwork and title was revealed, and it was announced that it would be released on 28 October 2013.

== Promotion ==
Union J performed "Carry You" live for the first time at Futurehits Live 2013. They also performed it on Britain's Got More Talent on 30 May 2013. They also sang it at Capital FM's Summertime Ball at Wembley Stadium on 9 June 2013 and at Chester Rocks 2013 on 15 June. In August 2013, it was announced the group would be supporting Selena Gomez on the European leg of her Stars Dance Tour in Lisbon. The song "Beethoven" was performed for the first time during their opening concert in Lisbon. They performed "Beautiful Life" on Friday Download on 25 October and on The Xtra Factor on 27 October. On 31 October, Union J appeared on Loose Women and performed "Beethoven".

== Singles ==
On 8 April 2013, the group confirmed the title and release of their debut single, "Carry You". This was followed by the unveiling of the accompanying artwork, which also debuted the band's logo. The track was given its radio premiere on 22 April, which was followed by the upload of an audio version of the single on Union J's official Vevo account. Whilst explaining the meaning behind the single, band member Jaymi Hensley said, "The message of the song is [that] we've been on a massive rollercoaster the last year with each other, and it's about being there for each other." He also revealed, "It's there for the fans, we really wouldn't be here without them." On 30 March 2013, Union J announced via their official Twitter account that the music video for the single had been filmed. An official teaser for the video was uploaded to the group's Vevo account on 26 April 2013. The full video first premiered through Capital TV on 29 April. The single reached number six on the UK Singles Chart.

On 3 September 2013, the group announced that "Beautiful Life" would be released as their second single on 21 October 2013, a week ahead of the release of the album. During an interview on This Morning, Hensley explained that it was an old song that they had recorded before they auditioned for The X Factor: "Our fans come from all walks of life and the message behind the song is what the band stands for - that no matter where you come from or what you are, we are all the same." The track premiered on 9 September 2013. It arrived in at number four on The Vodafone Big Top 40 on 20 October 2013 and charted at number eight on the UK Singles Chart the following week.

"Loving You Is Easy" was announced to be the album's third single on 5 November 2013, on the band's Twitter account. The music video was released on 4 December 2013.

== Reception ==
Professional ratings
Review scores
Source	Rating
AllMusic	3.5/5 stars
Virginmedia.com	2/5 stars
The Arts Desk	1/5 stars

== Track listing ==
No.	Title	Writer(s)	Producer(s)	Length
1.	"Carry You"	Steve Mac; Claude Kelly	Steve Mac	3:06
2.	"Beautiful Life"	Jo Perry; Joseph Lawrence; Blair Dreelan; Jon Maguire; Jon Lilygreen	Joseph Lawrence; Tom, Dick & Harry Productions	3:58
3.	"Loving You Is Easy"	Wayne Hector; Austin Mahone; Jason Desrouleaux; Mac	Mac	3:12
4.	"Last Goodbye"	Simon Katz; Samuel Martin; Matt Squire	Ze Infidels	3:39
5.	"Beethoven"	Iain James; Lindy Robbins; Mac	Mac	2:56
6.	"Head in the Clouds"	August Rigo; Mac	Mac	3:17
7.	"Where Are You Now"	Hector; Robbins; Mac	Mac	4:00
8.	"Save the Last Dance"	Hector; Robbins; Mac	Mac	3:44
9.	"Amaze Me" (No Angels cover)	Karen Poole; Mac	Mac	3:54
10.	"Skyscraper" (Demi Lovato cover)	Robbins; Tobias Gad; Kerli Kõiv	Tim Powell	3:42
Total length:				35:31

Deluxe edition bonus disc
No.	Title	Writer(s)	Producer(s)	Length
1.	"Carry You (acoustic)"	Mac; Kelly	Mac	3:24
2.	"Head in the Clouds (acoustic)"	Rigo; Mac	Mac	2:48
3.	"Where Are You Now (acoustic)"	Hector; Robbins; Mac	Mac	4:03
4.	"Lucky Ones"	Hector; Ed Drewett; Ross Golan; Mac	Mac	3:20
Total length:				13:40

Notes

- All credits adapted from album liner notes.

== Charts and certifications ==
=== Weekly charts ===
Chart (2013)	Peak position
Belgian Albums (Ultratop Flanders)	114
Belgian Albums (Ultratop Wallonia)	170
Irish Albums (IRMA)	8
Portuguese Albums (AFP)	25
Scottish Albums (Official Charts)	5
UK Albums (Official Charts)	6

=== Year-end charts ===
Chart (2013)	Position
UK Albums Chart	190

=== Certifications ===
Region	Certification	Certified units/sales
United Kingdom (BPI)	Silver	60,000^{*}
^{*} Sales figures based on certification alone.

== Release history ==
Region	Date	Format	Edition
Ireland	25 October 2013	CD, digital download	Standard, deluxe
United Kingdom	28 October 2013	CD, digital download	Standard, deluxe
Portugal	28 October 2013	CD, digital download	Deluxe

== Magazines and TV Screens Tour ==
Magazines and TV Screens Tour
- Tour by Union J
- Associated album: Union J
- Start date: December 14, 2013
- End date: April 6, 2014
- Legs: 1
- No. of shows: 19 in United Kingdom; 1 in Ireland; 1 in Portugal; Total 21

The Magazines and TV Screens Tour (stylised as Magazine + TV Screens Tour) is a concert tour by Union J in support of their solo debut studio album Union J. The tour was their first headlining tour in the United Kingdom, Ireland and Portugal.

== Background ==
On 11 June 2013, Union J announced that they would be touring the United Kingdom and Ireland in support of their debut album, Union J. When asked about the tour, the band stated:

"The thing we love most about music is performing and we are so excited to get out on the road for our first ever tour. Playing our album to fans will be brilliant. We are so excited and promise to put on a really special show."

Tickets went on sale on 14 June 2013. The band added an extra date to Belfast on the tour.

== Opening acts ==
- Room 94
- 5Angels
- Elyar Fox
- Ollie Marland
- Nagiiba Georgiou Abdulah
- D8 (X-Factor Portugal finalist)
- NO STRESS (Portuguese Band)

== Set list ==
- Where Are You Now
- Beethoven
- Head In The Clouds
- Wild Ones/Roar (Katy Perry and Flo Rida cover) (George's Solo)
- Carry You
- Save The Last Dance
- Lucky Ones
- Listen (Beyoncé cover) (Jaymi's Solo)
- Skyscraper (Demi Lovato cover)
- Amaze Me
- Counting Stars (OneRepublic cover) (JJ's Solo)
- I Knew You Were Trouble/We Are Never Ever Getting Back Together/22/Love Story/Everything Has Changed (Taylor Swift cover)
- Beneath Your Beautiful (Labrinth cover) (Josh's Solo)
- Beautiful Life
- Last Goodbye

Encore:

- Loving You Is Easy

== Tour dates ==
Date	City	Country	Venue	Opening acts
14 December 2013	Oxford	United Kingdom	New Theatre Oxford	Elyar Fox; Ollie Marland; 5Angels
15 December 2013	Cardiff	United Kingdom	Motorpoint Arena Cardiff	Elyar Fox; Ollie Marland; 5Angels
16 December 2013	Sheffield	United Kingdom	Sheffield City Hall	Elyar Fox; Ollie Marland; 5Angels
18 December 2013	Plymouth	United Kingdom	Plymouth Pavilions	Elyar Fox; Ollie Marland; 5Angels
19 December 2013	Brighton	United Kingdom	Brighton Centre	Elyar Fox; Ollie Marland; 5Angels
21 December 2013	Manchester	United Kingdom	O2 Apollo Manchester	Elyar Fox; Ollie Marland; 5Angels
22 December 2013	Bournemouth	United Kingdom	Bournemouth International Centre	Elyar Fox; Ollie Marland; 5Angels
23 December 2013^{[A]}	London	United Kingdom	Hammersmith Apollo	Elyar Fox; Ollie Marland; 5Angels
28 December 2013	Newcastle	United Kingdom	Newcastle City Hall	Elyar Fox; Ollie Marland; 5Angels
29 December 2013	Nottingham	United Kingdom	Nottingham Royal Concert Hall	Elyar Fox; Ollie Marland; 5Angels
30 December 2013	Manchester	United Kingdom	O2 Apollo Manchester	Elyar Fox; Ollie Marland; 5Angels
3 January 2014	Ipswich	United Kingdom	Regent Theatre	Elyar Fox; Ollie Marland; 5Angels
5 January 2014	Bristol	United Kingdom	Colston Hall	Elyar Fox; Ollie Marland; 5Angels
6 January 2014	Liverpool	United Kingdom	Echo Arena Liverpool	Elyar Fox; Ollie Marland; 5Angels
7 January 2014	Glasgow	United Kingdom	Clyde Auditorium	Elyar Fox; Ollie Marland; 5Angels
9 January 2014	Blackpool	United Kingdom	Blackpool Opera House	Elyar Fox; Ollie Marland; 5Angels
10 January 2014	Birmingham	United Kingdom	National Indoor Arena	Elyar Fox; Ollie Marland; 5Angels
12 January 2014	Belfast	United Kingdom	Waterfront Hall	Elyar Fox; Ollie Marland; 5Angels
13 January 2014	Belfast	United Kingdom	Waterfront Hall	Elyar Fox; Ollie Marland; 5Angels
14 January 2014	Dublin	Ireland	The O2	Elyar Fox; Ollie Marland; 5Angels
6 April 2014	Lisbon	Portugal	MEO Arena	D8; No Stress; Emblem3

^{[A]}Matinée and evening shows
