= Tonight (We Live Forever) =

Single by Union J

from the album You Got It All – The Album
- Released: 15 August 2014
- Recorded: 2014
- Genre: Pop
- Length: 3:20
- Label: Epic; Syco
- Songwriter(s): Rick Parkhouse; George Tizzard; Josh Wilkinson; Roy Stride
- Producer(s): Red Triangle; Simon Katz

Union J singles chronology
"Loving You Is Easy" (2013)	"Tonight (We Live Forever)" (2014)	"You Got It All" (2014)

"Tonight (We Live Forever)" is a song by English boy band Union J. It was released through Epic Records on 15 August 2014 as the lead single from their second studio album You Got It All – The Album (2014). It was written by Rick Parkhouse, George Tizzard, Josh Wilkinson and Roy Stride, and produced by Red Triangle and Simon Katz.

The song debuted at number 9 in the United Kingdom, becoming the band's third top 10 hit.

== Background ==
In April 2014, Union J left RCA Records and signed with Epic Records.

The single's promotional artwork was revealed by the band via Twitter on 16 June 2014. Speaking to Capital FM on 19 June 2014, Union J said, "This track sums up what Union J are about in terms of our sound and it also reflects who we are together - a group of friends having the time of our lives. It's a happy song that lifts our mood whenever we hear it." The actual artwork was revealed on 18 July.

== Critical reception ==
4Music called the song a "big new anthem". Paul Leake of clickmusic.com gave it three-and-a-half out of five stars and commended the band for "finally [getting] some energy behind them". In a negative review, Amy Davidson of Digital Spy stated that Union J were "playing it safe" and awarded the song two stars.

== Music video ==
A lyric video was filmed in Los Angeles and was uploaded to YouTube on 19 June 2014. It consists entirely of numerous Snapchat clips that last no more than five seconds each.

The official music video was directed by Director X. It was uploaded on 23 July 2014. The video features Union J hosting a party in a flat.

== Live performances ==
Union J performed "Tonight" live for the first time at the Capital Summertime Ball on 21 June 2014. They also performed the track live during the Blinkbox Music UK Live concerts during June and July, performing live at Sunderland, Ipswich and Weston-super-Mare.

== Chart performance ==
The single charted at #9 in the UK Singles Chart on the week of August 30. In its second week on the chart, it fell to #74, before leaving the chart the following week.

== Track listings ==
Digital download

1. "Tonight (We Live Forever)" – 3:20

CD single

1. "Tonight (We Live Forever)" – 3:20
2. "Tonight (We Live Forever)" (Karaoke Version) – 3:20

Digital remixes

1. "Tonight (We Live Forever)" (Cahill Radio Edit)
2. "Tonight (We Live Forever)" (Cahill Remix)

Digital download

1. "Tonight (We Live Forever)" (George & Jaymi Re-Fix)

Digital download

1. "Tonight (We Live Forever)" (Josh & JJ Re-Fix)

== Charts ==
Chart (2014)	Peak position
Ireland (IRMA)	45
Scotland (OCC)	7
UK Singles (OCC)	9

== Release history ==
Region	Date	Format	Label
Ireland	15 August 2014	Digital download, CD single	Epic Records, Syco Music
United Kingdom	17 August 2014	Digital download, CD single	Epic Records, Syco Music
