= You Got It All (album) =

2014 album by Union J

Studio album by Union J
- Released: 8 December 2014
- Recorded: 2014
- Genre: Pop
- Length: 42:12
- Label: Syco Music, Sony, Epic
- Producer: Simon Katz, Red Triangle, Phil Cook, James F. Reynolds, Josh Wilkinson, Jon Maguire, Matt Rad, Jamie Scott, Toby Smith, Ricky Reed, Joe London, Peter Steengard, Duck Blackwell, Oh, Hush!, Tim Powell, Matt Schwartz, Jack McManus

Union J chronology
Union J (2013)	You Got It All (2014)	Ten (2022)

Singles from You Got It All
- 1. "Tonight (We Live Forever)" Released: 15 August 2014; 2. "You Got It All" Released: 30 November 2014

You Got It All (stylized as You Got It All – The Album) is the second studio album by British boy band Union J. It was released in the United Kingdom on 8 December 2014 through Syco Music, Sony Music, Epic Records.

"Tonight (We Live Forever)" was released as the album's first single in August 2014 and reached number nine in the United Kingdom, making it the group's third top 10 hit. The title track "You Got It All" was released on 30 November. This was the last album to feature the original members after George Shelley and Josh Cuthbert left the group.

== Singles ==
"Tonight (We Live Forever)" was released as the album's first single in August 2014 and reached number nine in the United Kingdom, marking the group's third top 10 hit.

In October 2014, the band confirmed their second single would be "You Got It All". It was released on 30 November 2014 in the UK and peaked at number 2, becoming the band's highest-charting single to date.

== Chart performance ==
You Got It All debuted at number 28 on the UK Albums Chart, selling 15,000 copies on its first week. The following week, the album dropped 23 places to number 51.

== Track listing ==
No.	Title	Writer(s)	Producer(s)	Length
1.	"Tonight (We Live Forever)"	Rick Parkhouse • Roy Stride • George Tizzard • Josh Wilkinson	Simon Katz • Red Triangle	3:20
2.	"You Got It All"	Nasri Atweh · Gregg Pagani	Phil Cook • James F. Reynolds	3:32
3.	"All About a Girl"	Josh Cuthbert • Alex Davies • JJ Hamblett • Jaymi Hensley • Jon Maguire • George Shelley • James F. Reynolds • Roy Stride • Josh Wilkinson	James F. Reynolds • Josh Wilkinson	3:15
4.	"One More Time"	Andrew Jackson • James F. Reynolds • Roy Stride • Josh Wilkinson	James F. Reynolds • Josh Wilkinson	2:32
5.	"Together"	Josh Cuthbert • JJ Hamblett • Jaymi Hensley • Jon Lilygreen • Jon Maguire • George Shelley • Nathan Towell	Simon Katz • Jon Maguire • Josh Wilkinson	3:03
6.	"I Can't Make You Love Me"	Mike Reid • Allen Shamblin	James F. Reynolds	3:52
7.	"She's In My Head"	Nick Hartman • Jamie Scott	Matt Rad • Jamie Scott • Toby Smith	3:32
8.	"Midnight Train"	Eric Frederic • Tom Peyton • John Ryan • Andreas Schuller • Joe Spargur • Noonie Bao	Ricky Reed • Joe London	3:33
9.	"I Love to Watch You Sleep"	Diane Warren	Peter Steengard	3:24
10.	"Central Park"	Duck Blackwell • Ki Fitzgerald • Jon Greene	Duck Blackwell	3:23
11.	"Girl Like You"	Oh, Hush! • James "J Hart" Abrahart • Joleen Belle	Oh, Hush!	4:15
12.	"YOLO"	Paddy Dalton • Rick Parkhouse • George Shelley • George Tizzard	Red Triangle	3:01
13.	"Get It Right"	Mary Leay • Tim Powell • James Newman • George Shelley	Tim Powell	3:16
14.	"Song for You and I"	Camille Purcell • Matt Schwartz • James F. Reynolds • Josh Wilkinson	James Reynolds • Matt Schwartz • Josh Wilkinson •	2:57
15.	"It's Beginning to Look a Lot Like Christmas" (bonus track)	Meredith Willson	Jack McManus • James F. Reynolds	2:59

== Charts ==
Chart (2014)	Peak position
Irish Albums (IRMA)	57
Scottish Albums (OCC)	26
UK Albums (OCC)	28
UK Album Downloads (OCC)	28
