= You Got It All (Union J song) =

2014 single by Union J

Single by Union J

from the album You Got It All – The Album
- Released: 28 November 2014
- Recorded: 2014
- Genre: Pop
- Length: 3:33
- Label: Epic, Syco
- Songwriter: Nasri Atweh
- Producers: Phil Cook; James Reynolds

Union J singles chronology
"Tonight (We Live Forever)" (2014)	"You Got It All" (2014)	"Alive" (2018)

"You Got It All" is a song performed by English boy band Union J, and written by Nasri (Magic!). It was released on 28 November 2014 in Ireland, and on 30 November 2014 in the UK, as the second and final single from Union J's second studio album You Got It All – The Album (2014). Additionally, a version featuring The Vamps was released on 1 December 2014. It marks the group's final single with George Shelley after he left the group on 4 March 2016.

== Background and composition ==
"You Got It All" was written by Nasri, lead singer of Canadian band Magic!. On 14 October 2014, Union J revealed the name of the track via Twitter. It premiered the following morning on Capital FM.

Talking to Capital FM, Josh Cuthbert said, "This single, it's a really important one for us. It's finally the sound that I think suits us. We've gone back to our roots. On The X Factor we sort of stood on stage and just sang, and this is what we've done with this song. And we love it," he added. "It's written by a Grammy Award winner [Nasri], so we're extremely lucky and we've been in safe hands with Nasri."

JJ Hamblett explained, "It's basically we've gone back to our old roots, it's a different lane for Union J," while Cuthbert added: "We feel like there's no other bands out there that are doing what this sound is, I think this is what we're going to stick with." George Shelley explained: "We've helped a lot with this song and it does mean a lot to us, especially to me since I have a deep connection with the lyrics within it. I thought of this one girl while helping writing it".

== Music video ==
The music video was directed by Frank Borin. It was uploaded to YouTube on 20 October 2014.

== Chart performance ==
The song debuted and peaked at number 64 in the Republic of Ireland, becoming their lowest charting single in the country to date. On 7 December 2014, the song debuted and peaked at number 2 on the UK Singles Chart, becoming their fourth top-ten hit in the UK and highest charting single to date. It also became the first song in UK chart history to miss the number one spot due to streaming, as it made number one on the sales-only chart, with digital downloads and CD single sales accounting for 45,849 copies.

== Live performances ==
Union J performed the song live for the first time on The X Factor on 30 November 2014.

== Track listing ==
Digital download

1. "You Got It All" – 3:32

Digital download

1. "You Got It All" (featuring The Vamps) – 3:35

CD single

1. "You Got It All" – 3:32
2. "It's Beginning to Look a Lot Like Christmas"

CD single 2 (George Edition)

1. "You Got It All" (George Live Edition)
2. "You Got It All" (Karaoke Version)

CD single 3 (Remixes)

1. "You Got It All" (The Alias Radio Edit)
2. "You Got I All" (The Alias Remix)

== Charts ==
Chart (2014)	Peak position
Ireland (IRMA)	64
Scotland Singles (OCC)	2
UK Singles (OCC)	2

== Release history ==
Region	Date	Format	Label
Ireland	28 November 2014	Digital download, CD single	Epic Records, Syco Music
United Kingdom	30 November 2014	Digital download, CD single	Epic Records, Syco Music
