= Union J =

English boy band

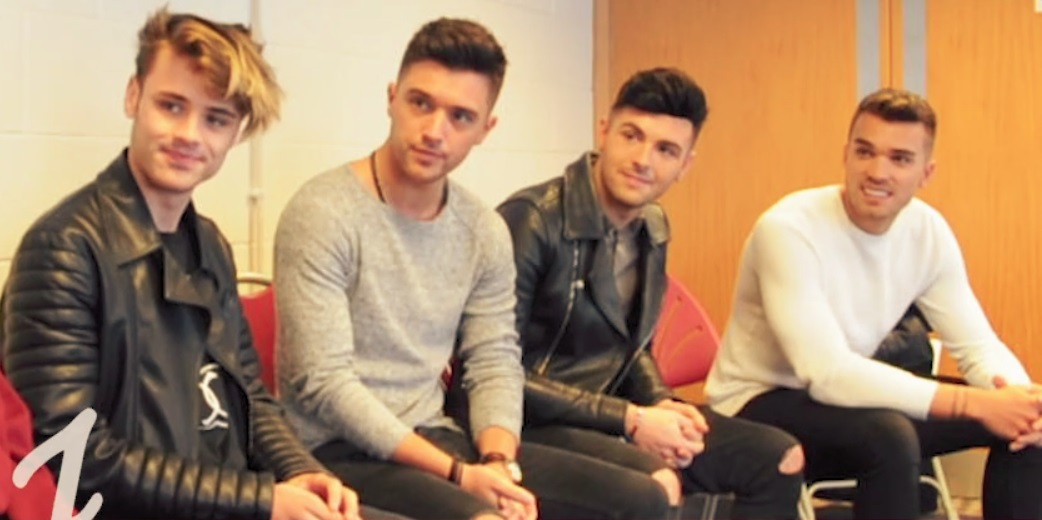
- Union J interviewed by students of Ullswater Community College in 2016

Background information
- Also known as: Triple J (2011–2012)
- Origin: London, England
- Genre: Pop
- Years active: 2011–2019; 2022–2023
- Labels: RU Listening; Syco; Sony; Epic
- Past members: George Shelley; JJ Hamblett; Josh Cuthbert; Casey Johnson; Jaymi Hensley

Union J were an English boy band, originally consisting of JJ Hamblett, Jaymi Hensley, George Shelley and Josh Cuthbert. Shelley left the group in 2016 and was replaced by Casey Johnson, who left several months later, Cuthbert left the group in 2018 leaving the band as duo until they disbanded in 2019. The band formed in 2011, originally as a trio known as Triple J, consisting of Cuthbert, Hamblett and Hensley. They auditioned for the ninth series of the British television music competition The X Factor where they met Shelley who joined the band at the judges' request. They were the tenth contestant eliminated and were subsequently signed to Sony Music subsidiary RCA Records. Their debut single "Carry You" was released in June 2013. Their self-titled debut studio album followed in October 2013 and peaked at number 6 on the UK Albums Chart.

Union J left RCA Records in April 2014 and signed with Epic Records. In the lead-up to the release of their second album You Got It All – The Album, the band released two singles: "Tonight (We Live Forever)" and "You Got It All". A new EP Who Would've Thought was released on 22 March 2019. Cuthbert left the band in 2018 leaving the group as a duo, they later disbanded in 2019.

On 31 January 2022 Union J confirmed they would be reforming to celebrate their tenth anniversary with Shelley and Cuthbert rejoining the group who respectively left in 2016 and 2018.

== History ==
=== 2011–2012: Formation and The X Factor ===
In 2007, Blair Dreelan of Alpha Dog Management met 14-year-old Josh Cuthbert, who was auditioning for the fourth series of The X Factor in front of judges Simon Cowell, Louis Walsh, Sharon Osbourne and Dannii Minogue. Cuthbert failed to progress to the bootcamp stage, but Dreelan believed that he looked like a pop star and was impressed by his voice: "I began to sort of work with him on various little projects like just sort of recording stuff because I've got a recording studio in Swindon." In 2011, Cuthbert and Jaymi Hensley met whilst studying performing arts at the Sylvia Young Theatre School in Westminster and later decided to put a band together. Former jockey Jamie "JJ" Hamblett was later added to the group by Dreelan, and they named themselves Triple J (due to each member sharing the same initial).

In May 2012, after eight months together, Triple J and soloist George Shelley both auditioned in London for the ninth series of The X Factor in front of judges Walsh, Gary Barlow, Tulisa and Nicole Scherzinger. Triple J performed Rihanna's international hit "We Found Love", whilst George covered an acoustic version of Britney Spears' "Toxic" – in which he also incorporated his guitar. Both acts progressed to the next stage of the competition, receiving positive critique from all judges present. Bootcamp saw Shelley perform Labrinth's "Earthquake", competing against female contestants; Charlie Cammish and Meg O'Neill. Triple J first sang Maroon 5's "Moves Like Jagger", before contending for the final place at judges' houses with GMD3 (later District3). They covered Chris Brown's "Yeah 3x", but were sent home after GMD3 were eventually chosen for judges' houses. However, following Rough Copy's forced withdrawal from the show, Dreelan was contacted by The X Factor producers with an offer for the group to return, on the basis that Shelley was added to the three-piece. All parties accepted the offer and the band – now a four-piece – became Union J and advanced to judges' houses alongside fellow recalled Times Red in the groups category, mentored by Walsh. The band's first performance as a four-piece was an acoustic cover of Carly Rae Jepsen's "Call Me Maybe". Walsh put them through to the live shows alongside District3 and MK1, and they instantly proved popular with social media users.

In week 1 of the live shows, Union J performed Queen's "Don't Stop Me Now". Despite negative feedback from the other judges, they progressed through to the next week after placing fourth in voting statistics behind Christopher Maloney, Jahméne Douglas and Ella Henderson, respectively. In week 4, the group received the fewest public votes with Jade Ellis, but were saved by Barlow, Scherzinger and Walsh. They found themselves in the bottom two again in week 6, against District3, but were saved for a second time by Barlow and Scherzinger, with Walsh refusing to vote between his acts. Union J were in the bottom two for a third time in the quarter-final, where they were saved by Walsh, Barlow and Tulisa over Rylan Clark. They were eliminated in the semi-final on 2 December. It was later reported that their winning single would have been a cover of Demi Lovato's "Skyscraper", which is featured on their debut album.

Performances on The X Factor
Show	Track(s)		Theme	Result
Show	Triple J	George Shelley	Theme	Result
Auditions	"We Found Love"	"Toxic"	Free choice	Progressed to Bootcamp
Bootcamp (1)	"Moves Like Jagger"	"Earthquake"	Bootcamp challenge	Rebranded/progressed to judges' houses
Bootcamp (2)	"Sweet Child o' Mine"	—N/a	Free choice	Rebranded/progressed to judges' houses
Judges' houses	"Call Me Maybe"		Free choice	Progressed to live shows
Live show 1	"Don't Stop Me Now"		Heroes (songs inspired by the Olympic Games)	Safe (4th)
Live show 2	"Bleeding Love" / "Broken Strings"		Love and heartbreak	Safe (7th)
Live show 3	"When Love Takes Over"		Club classics	Safe (8th)
Live show 4	"Sweet Dreams"		Halloween	Bottom two (8th)
Live show 4 results	"Perfect"		Free choice	Safe (3/4 majority vote)
Live show 5	"Love Story"		Number-ones	Safe (4th)
Live show 6	"Fix You"		Best of British	Bottom two (6th)
Live show 6 results	"Set Fire to the Rain"		Free choice	Safe (2/2 majority vote)
Live show 7	"Call Me Maybe"		Guilty pleasures	Safe (4th)
Quarter-Final	"The Winner Takes It All"		ABBA	Bottom two (4th)
Quarter-Final	"I'll Be There"		Motown	Bottom two (4th)
Quarter-Final Results	"Run"		Free choice	Safe (3/4 majority vote)
Semi-Final	"Beneath Your Beautiful"		Free choice/someone special	Eliminated by public vote (4th)
Semi-Final	"I'm Already There"		Free choice/songs to get you to the final	Eliminated by public vote (4th)

=== 2013–2014: Union J and You Got It All ===
Union J first announced that they had signed a record deal with Sony Music Entertainment at a performance in Cardiff, Wales, on 15 December 2012. Their debut single "Carry You" was recorded in London in January 2013 and was released in June 2013, charting at number six in the United Kingdom. On 28 January, it was confirmed that the subsidiary label that Union J had signed with was RCA Records. In June 2013, it was announced that the band would embark on their first UK headline tour, the Magazines + TV Screens Tour, which consisted of 18 dates in December 2013 and January 2014. They also revealed that their debut album would be released on 28 October 2013.

Union J announced that their second single, "Beautiful Life", would be released on 21 October 2013, a week before their self-titled debut album, Union J. On 2 October 2013, the band revealed that they are partnering up with Pokémon for the UK release of X and Y. On 5 November 2013, they announced that their third single would be "Loving You Is Easy".

On 2 January 2014, while guest editing the Daily Star's Playlist column, Union J announced that they would release their second album in 2014. Jaymi said, "Very exciting, we're about to start recording our second studio album, which is massive. And then I think we're going to write on the album as well, work with some new producers." Josh also said that they hope to "find that lane that [they] want to go down." They also revealed that they felt there was pressure on them to match the huge success of One Direction, as Louis Walsh had expected them to have a number-one single. The band also revealed that they did write songs for their debut album which ultimately failed to make the final cut, but hoped to have more self-penned tracks on their second album. Hensley told Digital Spy, "We did write for [their first] album and we'd done about 14 songs but they didn't go on the album, maybe because they weren't right. The thing about writing is it's personal but also the more practice you get, the better you get."

On 5 April, Cuthbert announced via Twitter that Union J had left RCA and signed a new deal with Epic Records. The first single to be taken from the band's second album is "Tonight (We Live Forever)", which was released on 17 August 2014. Following its premiere on Capital FM on 18 June 2014, the single entered the iTunes Top 100 Chart through pre-order sales alone. Union J performed "Tonight (We Live Forever)" live for the first time at Capital FM's Summertime Ball. On 24 August, "Tonight" debuted at number 9 in the UK.

On 14 October, it was announced that the second single from their second album is entitled "You Got It All". Its first play was on 15 October on Capital FM. On 30 October, Union J that announced that their second album will be called You Got It All – The Album and was released on 8 December 2014. Despite promoting the album on The X Factor and The Xtra Factor, it entered at number 28 on the UK Albums Chart, selling 15,000 copies on its first week.

=== 2015–2019: Tour, departures and split ===
Union J were the main support act on The Vamps' arena tour in the UK and Ireland in April and May 2015. They announced that they were doing An Audience with Union J in October and November, and also revealed that they are working on their third album.

Shelley left the group in March 2016; speaking exclusively to The Sun's Dan Wootton, Cuthbert blamed Shelley's departure on the latter's changing manner following his stint on I'm a Celebrity...Get Me Out of Here!. Cuthbert said, "I would much rather have someone who wants to do it and is committed to do it. I’m not going to lose any sleep over him not being in the band." Hensley revealed that Shelley's departure was a mutual agreement between all four members and that there were no bad feelings or jealousy which led to it.

Union J recorded their third album called "Who Would've Thought" in Los Angeles in May 2016. It was also announced that theywould be touring Butlins throughout the summer of 2016. In April 2017, Johnson left the band and the remaining members announced that they would continue as a trio.

In July 2018, Union J announced that they will be releasing their new single on the same month. In the same month, it was announced that the single is called "Alive" and will be released on 13 July 2018. They released a second single, Dancing featuring Ironik, off their third album on 25 August.

Josh Lloyd-Cuthbert then quit the band in October, leaving Hamblett and Hensley as a duo. Cuthbert told The Sun:

"The music industry is really difficult. It plays with your emotions, it's ups and downs and you go through different managers. Over the last few years we’ve had different managers and we've been promised the world and been let down. We've got a label now which are great and I respect them lots and have nothing but good words to say about them, but it is difficult when you change members.

George obviously left, which was hard for us, but everyone has different reasons and has different things going on. Now that I'm making this decision myself I understand why George made that decision two years ago.

At the time you don't really get it, until you have the same feelings as him, which I now have. I spoke to them on the phone and I just hope that they support me, I want to stay friends with the boys, I love them."

The remaining members of Union J released their third and final single from Who Would've Thought, called "Paralysed", on 14 December 2018, with a video appearing on their YouTube channel on 25 January 2019. JJ Hamblett and Jaymi Hensley then disbanded.

=== 2022–2023: Tenth anniversary reunion ===
On 31 January 2022, the band confirmed they would be reforming to celebrate their tenth anniversary. Shelley and Cuthbert rejoined the group for the reunion and announced a one night residency at The London Palladium on 28 May 2022. On the night of the concert, they announced they would be embarking on a comeback tour.

On 23 December 2022, Union J released their third studio album, Ten, to celebrate the tenth anniversary of the band's formation. On 9 December 2022 the group announced they would be embarking on a headline UK tour the following year. On 19 March 2023 the group issued a statement on their social media platforms saying they had to cancel their upcoming tour, they did not state the reason(s) why.

On 11 April 2023, Hensley announced his departure from the band via Twitter. He said: "I hoped and dreamed of all possibilities afterwards, but this has not happened for several reasons, and therefore, out of love & respect to the family of fans and my integrity as an artist, I cannot sit and watch the legacy that I have tried to sustain for a decade decay any further." The group later disbanded.

== Products and endorsements ==
Union J made an appearance in the 2013 comedy film Kick-Ass 2, playing heartthrobs adored by Hit-Girl's teenage school friends.

On 2 April 2013, it was announced that they had signed a book deal to publish an autobiography through Penguin Books and Michael Joseph, prior to the release of their album on 26 September 2013. The band commented, "We are very excited to be working with Penguin on our first book and are looking forward to the chance to tell our stories, of how we came together and where we came from, as well as the journey we've taken since X Factor." The autobiography, titled Our Story: Union J 100% Official, was released on 21 October 2013. They also released The Official Union J 2014 Annual.

On 21 January 2014, the band launched a set of lookalike dolls. On 7 February, Panini launched the official Union J sticker collection.

== Members ==
- JJ Hamblett (2011–2019, 2022–2023)
- Josh Cuthbert (2011–2018, 2022–2023)
- Jaymi Hensley (2011–2019, 2022–2023)
- George Shelley (2012–2016, 2022–2023)
- Casey Johnson (2016–2017)

Timeline

=== JJ Hamblett ===
Jamie Paul "JJ" Hamblett, born 25 May 1988 (age 38), is from Newmarket, Suffolk. He is the oldest member of the group and was one of the three original members of Triple J. He was a jockey until he was 21, riding in 270 races and winning 24 times. He has ridden for the Queen and met her. On 18 September 2013, Hamblett announced that he and his then girlfriend were expecting a child together, making both of them first-time parents. Hamblett's son was born shortly thereafter during November 2013.

In August 2015, Hamblett announced the start of a new reality television project with his former girlfriend and mother of his child, by posting a sneak peek video on Facebook but the venture did not progress beyond initial promotions. Also at this time, Hamblett announced that he signed a contract with ThinkersPR Talent but this business relationship was discontinued.

In January 2019, Hamblett appeared on the fourth series of Celebrity Coach Trip alongside Jaymi Hensley.

=== Jaymi Hensley ===
James William "Jaymi" Hensley, born 24 February 1990 (age 36), is from Luton, Bedfordshire. He was one of the three original members of Triple J. Hensley has been in a relationship with Olly Marmon since 2009 and proposed to him in 2010. He went to a theatre school with Cuthbert. He has 17 tattoos. Before The X Factor, he did both ballet and gymnastics, but his career as a gymnast was cut off by a broken wrist, and he struggled with his weight when he was no longer exercising so much. In 2015, Hensley appeared with singer Sinitta on Pointless Celebrities, a celebrity edition of the BBC game show Pointless. Having made his panto debut in the lead role in Peter Pan at the White Rock Theatre (Hastings) in December 2016. Hensley was set to play the lead role in the Aladdin panto at the Derngate Theatre (Northampton) over December 2017. Hensley has been in a long-term relationship with Olly Marmon since 24 September 2009. They became engaged in 2014. Hensley and Marmon were originally due to get married in 2015, but postponed their wedding for a few years. In August 2024 Olly Marmon died following a fall from a hotel window, a few weeks before he and Jaymi were due to be married.

In January 2019, Hensley appeared on the fourth series of Celebrity Coach Trip alongside JJ Hamblett. Hensley is now starring in Joseph and the Amazing Technicolour Dreamcoat as Joseph, Directed by Bill Kenwright at Theatre Royal Windsor.

=== George Shelley ===
George Paul Shelley, born 27 July 1993 (age 33), in Clevedon, North Somerset, was the youngest member of the group. His parents Dominic Shelley and Toni Harris are divorced, Dominic remarried. He has two brothers Tom, who lives in Australia, and Will, who did three tours with the Marines in Afghanistan; a younger sister Harriet who died in April 2016 after being hit by a car, and two step-sisters Anabelle and Louisa along with four half-brothers Leo, Archie, Spencer and Roman. He attended Weston College in Weston-super-Mare from 2010 until 2011, where he completed a BTEC Extended Diploma in Graphic Design.

Shelley auditioned for The X Factor as a solo artist singing "Toxic" in 2012 while he worked as a Barista in Costa Coffee and was eliminated during bootcamp, but they later called him back to join Triple J and form Union J.

In 2015, Shelley appeared as one of the thirteen contestants on the fifteenth series of I'm a Celebrity...Get Me Out of Here! On 4 March 2016, it was announced Shelley left Union J to pursue other career endeavours.

=== Casey Johnson ===
Casey Johnson, born 1 May 1995 (age 31), was the most recent member of Union J. Johnson auditioned for the X Factor in 2014 and became a member of eight-piece band Stereo Kicks. The band released one single, "Love Me So", and a month later they split as they could not afford to continue without a record deal.

On 6 May 2016, Union J announced that Johnson was the newest member of the band, and that they were to continue as a four-piece. However, he left the band less than a year later.

=== Josh Cuthbert ===
Joshua Thomas John "Josh" Cuthbert, born 28 July 1992 (age 34), is from Ascot, Berkshire. He attended Charters School in Berkshire and The Sixth Form College Farnborough. He was one of the three original members of Triple J. Before The X Factor, he worked in an office and starred in the West End musical Chitty Chitty Bang Bang when he was 14. In 2009, he was invited to join The Wanted, but was unable to do so because of a two-year contract with another band, Replay.

Cuthbert also used to be a footballer, playing as a goalkeeper, but had to quit after damaging his thumb in a shooting accident. Cuthbert said, "I played football from a young age. Playing in goal meant I broke every single finger but one day I was shooting an air rifle with my grandad and the gun was faulty. My thumb got trapped and I ended up losing half of it. And obviously being a goalie your thumb is an integral part."

Cuthbert was in a relationship with model Chloe Lloyd since November 2014. On 14 November 2015, Cuthbert proposed to Lloyd on a gondola ride in Venice. On 9 August 2018, Cuthbert married Lloyd at a private wedding at Aynhoe Park.

On 7 February 2015, Cuthbert signed a modelling contract with modeling agency Two Management. On 11 May 2015, it was announced that he had signed a modelling contract with modeling agency Storm Model Management in London. On 16 June 2015, Josh announced that he signed a contract with Red Model Management. In 2016, he signed a contract with Select Model Management in London.

== Discography ==
- Union J (2013)
- You Got It All – The Album (2014)
- Ten (2022)

== Tours ==
Headlining

- The X Factor Live Tour (2013)
- Magazines + TV Screens (2013–14)
- An Audience with Union J (2015)
- Union J Europe Tour (2016)
- Union J UK Tour (2017)

One Night Residency

- 10th Anniversary Reunion (2022)

Supporting

- Selena Gomez – Stars Dance (2013) '
- The Vamps – The Vamps Arena Tour (2015)
- Christina Aguilera – EU/UK Summer Series (2022)

== Awards and nominations ==
Year	Award	Nominee	Category	Result
2013	Popdust	Union J	Next Pop Superstar of 2013	Third
2013	BBC Radio 1 Teen Awards	Union J	Best British Breakthrough	Won
2014	Best of 2013 Awards	Union J	Best Boyband of 2013	Fourth
2014	Nickelodeon Kids' Choice Awards	Union J	UK Favourite Band	Nominated
2014	World Music Awards	Union J	World's Best Group	Nominated
2014	World Music Awards	Union J	World's Best Live Act	Nominated
2014	World Music Awards	"Beautiful Life"	World's Best Song	Nominated
2014	World Music Awards	"Beautiful Life"	World's Best Video	Nominated
