= About Love (song) =

2021 single by Marina

Single by Marina

from the album To All the Boys: P.S. I Still Love You (Music from the Netflix Film)
- Released: 7 February 2020
- Genre: Pop
- Length: 3:34
- Label: Capitol
- Songwriters: Marina Diamandis; Ben Berger; Ryan McMahon; Ryan Rabin
- Producer: Captain Cuts

Marina singles chronology
"Karma" (2019)	"About Love" (2020)	"Man's World" (2020)

To All the Boys soundtrack singles chronology
"About Love" (2020)	"As I'll Ever Be" (2020)

Lyric video
- "About Love" on YouTube

"About Love" is a song by Welsh singer and songwriter Marina from the soundtrack to the American film To All the Boys: P.S. I Still Love You (2020). The song was written by Marina and the members of Captain Cuts, which consists of Ben Berger, Ryan McMahon, and Ryan Rabin; the trio also handled the song's production. It was released for digital download and streaming as the soundtrack's lead single on 7 February 2020 by Capitol Records. The song was teased two weeks prior to its release, which coincided with the announcement of a United States concert tour that was ultimately cancelled due to the COVID-19 pandemic. A pop song with a danceable beat, it is about the uncertainties in a relationship and the unpredictability of love. In the film, the song appears during a scene where the protagonist confesses about love to her boyfriend.

"About Love" received generally favourable reviews from music critics; it was called catchy and labelled by some as a highlight of the To All the Boys: P.S. I Still Love You soundtrack. The song appeared on the extension chart to the Ultratop Top 50, in Belgium's Wallonia region, where it peaked at number 38. It was also nominated for Best Soundtrack Song at the 46th annual People's Choice Awards in 2020. An animated promotional lyric video for the song was released via Capitol Records' YouTube channel on 11 February 2020.

== Background and release ==
In 2019, Marina entered a new era in her career, beginning by dropping "and the Diamonds" from her stage name and releasing her fourth studio album, Love + Fear. The album spawned several singles and included the Clean Bandit and Luis Fonsi collaboration "Baby" (2018). Following its release in April 2019, Love + Fear received significant hype and attention due to Marina's extended four-year hiatus. For promotion, she embarked on the accompanying Love + Fear Tour later in the year and released her sixth extended play Love + Fear (Acoustic) in September 2019. Marina also teased that she was working on an upcoming fifth studio album, when she posted a photo to her Instagram account. The picture was published in January 2020 and features Marina standing in her home alongside the caption "Album 5".

"About Love" was first mentioned on 29 January 2020 in a press release for the 2020 Netflix-produced American film To All the Boys: P.S. I Still Love You, where it was listed as the third track on the track listing for the accompanying soundtrack album. The soundtrack is the first album to be produced for the To All the Boys film franchise, while "About Love" marked Marina's first release of new music since Love + Fear in 2019. The song was written by Marina alongside its three producers, Ben Berger, Ryan McMahon, and Ryan Rabin; they make up the trio of Captain Cuts. Marina had previously collaborated with Captain Cuts on Love + Fear, with them contributing production to the single "Superstar". "About Love" appears during the final scene and ending credits to To All the Boys: P.S. I Still Love You.

"About Love" was released for digital download and streaming in various countries on 7 February 2020, through Capitol Records. The soundtrack to the film was also digitally released on that date. Alongside the commercial release of the single, Marina announced additional touring dates in the United States, scheduled throughout April 2020. However, the concert series was cancelled in its entirety as a result of the ongoing COVID-19 pandemic. On 11 February 2020, an accompanying promotional lyric video was uploaded to Capitol Records' YouTube channel. The visual was produced and directed by Filipino artist Bianca Nicdao, and animated by Goldmond Fong. Furthermore, a promotional CD single, intended to receive radio airplay, was distributed throughout the Benelux region of Europe by the Universal Music Group.

== Composition and lyrics ==
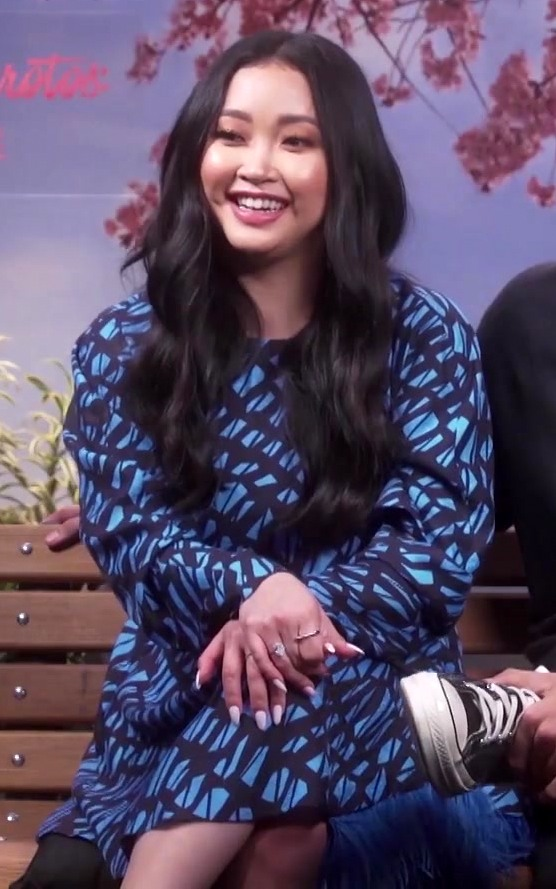
In To All the Boys: P.S. I Still Love You, "About Love" appears during an important scene for Lara Jean, portrayed by Vietnamese-born American actress Lana Condor (shown).

Musically, "About Love" has been described as a pop track and a love song with a danceable beat. The song appears at a point in To All the Boys: P.S. I Still Love You that has been classified as the narrative's climax. In the scene, protagonist Lara Jean, portrayed by Vietnamese-born American actress Lana Condor, is describing her personal opinions regarding love to her love interest, Peter, played by American actor Noah Centineo. Allison Stubblebine from Nylon described "About Love" as one of several "danceable tunes" about love that appear on the film's soundtrack.

According to the sheet music published at Musicnotes.com, "About Love" is set in the time signature of common time, and has a moderate tempo of 97 beats per minute. The key of the song is in C major and it follows the setup of a verse, followed by a pre-chorus, chorus, and post-chorus. Throughout the song's two verses, her vocal range advances in the chord progression of F–C–G-Am–A. It was engineered by Manny Marroquin and Robert Vosgien, who also mixed and mastered the track, respectively. Marina's boyfriend Jack Patterson, of British group Clean Bandit, served as the track's vocal producer. The song has a running time of 3 minutes and 34 seconds.

Lyrically, the song discusses the uncertainties that accompany the beginning stages of a relationship. Marina opens the song with: "Started in the strangest way / Didn't see it coming / Swept up in your hurricane / Wouldn't give it up for nothing". She continues by claiming that love is unpredictable in the chorus; she admits: "I don't really know a lot about love / But you're in my head, you're in my blood / And it feels so good, it hurts so much".

== Reception ==
Prior to the release of "About Love", Mike Wass from Idolator wrote in anticipation of the single: "Of the previously unheard tracks, pop fans will be most excited by the prospect of new Marina." After its distribution for digital consumption, the track was met with generally positive reviews from music critics. Mike Nied, also a writer for Idolator, wrote a favorable review of the song, stating that: "If this is a hint of what to expect on her fifth album, then we're in for a serious treat". He also described the song as "a stunner" and recommended it as a highlight in his weekly "New Music Friday" column. Michelle Topham of Leo Sigh enjoyed the song, calling it "so darned catchy." Stubblebine discussed the song in an advanced review of the soundtrack; she wrote that the inclusion of a new single from Marina on the "killer" soundtrack would only add to the anticipation of the film.

"About Love" appeared on the official record charts in Belgium. In the country's Wallonia region, "About Love" entered the main Ultratip Bubbling Under chart, which serves as an extension to the main Top 50 chart. It peaked at number 38 on 29 February 2020, and lasted a total of seven weeks on the chart. On 1 October of the same year, it was announced that "About Love" was nominated for Best Soundtrack Song at the 46th annual People's Choice Awards. It lost to "Only the Young" by American singer-songwriter Taylor Swift, a promotional release from her 2020 documentary Miss Americana.

== Track listing ==
Digital download/promotional CD single/streaming
No.	Title	Length
1.	"About Love"	3:34

== Credits and personnel ==
Credits adapted from Tidal.

- Marina Diamandis – writer, vocals
- Ben Berger – writer
- Ryan McMahon – writer
- Ryan Rabin – writer
- Captain Cuts – producer
- Jack Patterson – vocal producer
- Manny Marroquin – mixing, engineer
- Robert Vosgien – mastering, engineer

== Charts ==
Chart performance for "About Love"
Chart (2020)	Peak position
Belgium (Ultratip Bubbling Under Wallonia)	38

== Release history ==
Release dates and formats for "About Love"
Region	Date	Format(s)	Label	Ref.
Various	7 February 2020	Digital download; streaming	Capitol	
Benelux	7 February 2020	Promotional CD	Universal	
