= Orange Trees =

2019 song by Marina

Single by Marina

from the album Love + Fear
- Released: 22 March 2019
- Studio: Wolf Cousins Studios (Stockholm)
- Genre: Electropop; indie pop
- Length: 3:08
- Label: Atlantic
- Songwriters: Marina Diamandis; Oscar Görres; Erik Hassle; Jakob Jerlstrom
- Producer: Oscar Görres

Marina singles chronology
"Superstar" (2019)	"Orange Trees" (2019)	"To Be Human" (2019)

Music video
- "Orange Trees" on YouTube

"Orange Trees" is a song by Welsh singer and songwriter Marina from her fourth studio album, Love + Fear (2019). The song was released for digital download and streaming as the album's third single on 22 March 2019 by Atlantic Records. It was written by Marina, Oscar Görres, Erik Hassle, and Jakob Jerlstrom, while produced by Görres. Several remixes of the song were commissioned by Atlantic and released throughout 2019, including one produced by German DJ Claptone. An acoustic version of "Orange Trees" appears on Marina's sixth extended play, Love + Fear (Acoustic) (2019). Musically, the song has been described as an electropop and indie pop track, with a tropical beat and lyrics that describe a summer romance spent in the beauty of nature. Marina wrote the song about the island city of Lefkada, Greece, where her family once lived.

"Orange Trees" received generally mixed reviews from music critics. Some considered the song a standout or compared it to Marina's previous single "Handmade Heaven", a track that also discusses nature in its lyrics, while other critics dismissed it as inferior to other Love + Fear tracks. Two accompanying music videos were produced and the original video was released alongside the song, directed by Sophie Muller, and filmed at a private villa in Puerto Vallarta. It depicts Marina adventuring and exploring the property with several friends. A vertical video was released in April 2019, featuring Marina singing while wearing a large, flower headpiece. To promote the song, Marina performed it on Late Night with Seth Meyers that same month. The song was also included on the setlist of her fourth concert tour, the Love + Fear Tour (2019).

== Background and release ==
To mark the beginning of a new era in her career, Marina stated via Twitter in 2018 that she would be dropping "and the Diamonds" from her stage name in order to release music as just Marina (stylised in all caps). She explained that, "It took me well over a year to figure out that a lot of my identity was tied up in who I was as an artist... and there wasn't much left of who I was." After the announcement, Marina released "Baby" with Clean Bandit, her first single under her new name. On 14 February 2019, she announced Love + Fear, her fourth studio album and first as Marina. The track listing was unveiled the same day, revealing "Orange Trees" as the third track on the album. Love + Fear serves as a double album that is composed of two segments, with each one exploring psychologist Elisabeth Kübler-Ross' theory that humans are only capable of experiencing the aforementioned two emotions. "Orange Trees" appears on the Love portion of the album, devoted to lyrics detailing positive thoughts and emotions, because it was categorised as a song about "her sense of home". The song was written by Marina, Oscar Görres, Erik Hassle, and Jakob Jerlstrom, while Görres handled production. Marina recorded her vocals for the song at Wolf Cousins Studios in Stockholm.

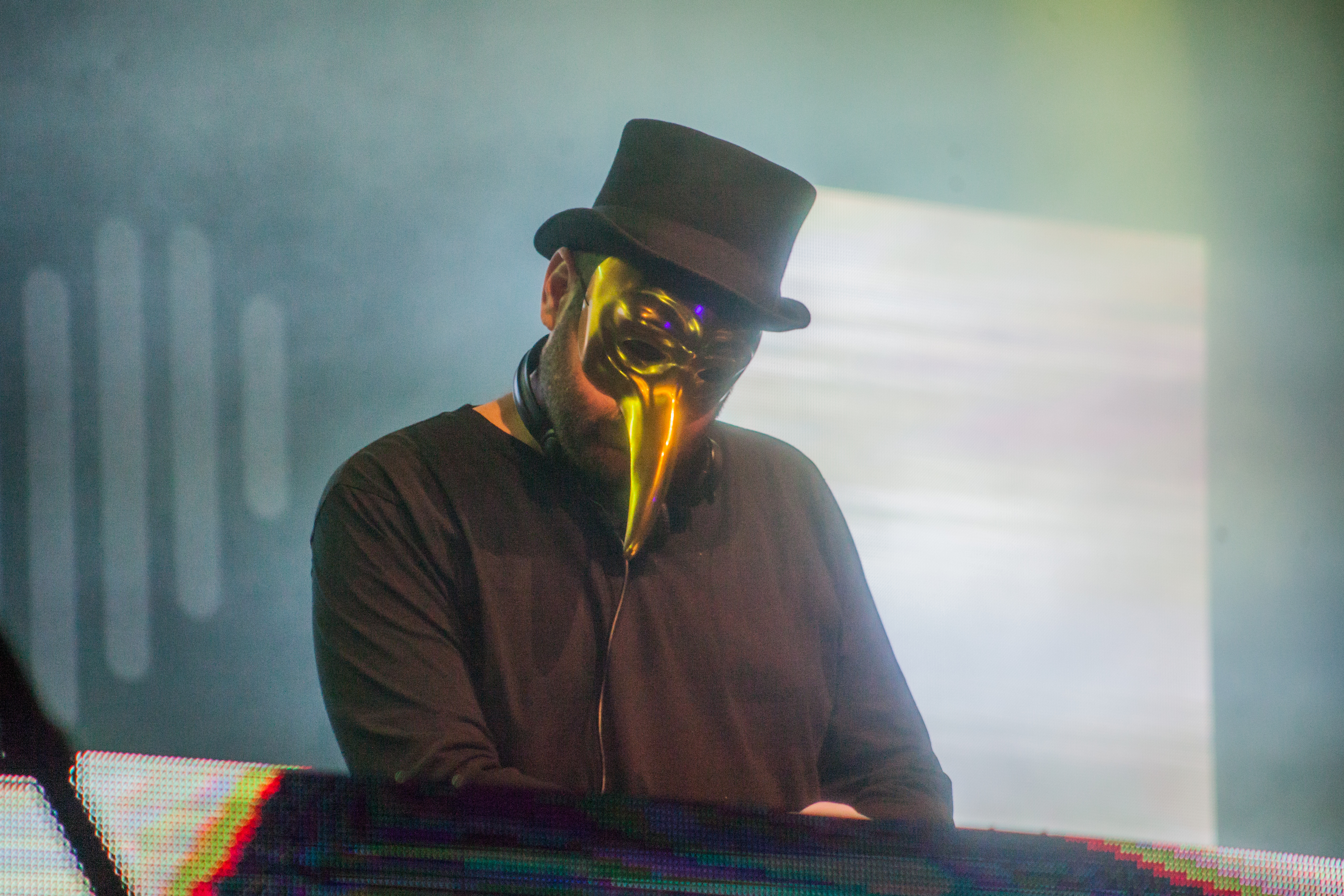
German DJ and producer Claptone created one of the song's four official remixes.

"Orange Trees" was released for digital download and streaming as a single in the United States on 22 March 2019 through Atlantic Records. On that same day via Spotify in the US, the song was bundled with previous singles "Handmade Heaven" and "Superstar" as part of a digital extended play to stream. A promotional CD single for "Orange Trees", intended for radio airplay, was distributed throughout the Benelux region of Europe by Atlantic Records and the Warner Music Group. It features the album version of the song plus four remixes, released in advance of their digital distributions.

Atlantic commissioned a total of four remixes to be made for "Orange Trees". They all first appeared on the Benelux promotional CD, but were then released separately for digital download and streaming; the first one, the Danny Dove remix, was released on 19 April 2019. The Bearson remix and Claptone remix followed, being released on 31 May and 7 June 2019, respectively. The Michael Goldwasser & Easy Star All-Stars Reggae remix was the last one, released for digital download and streaming on 14 June. An acoustic version of the song was recorded and included on the track listing for Marina's sixth EP, Love + Fear (Acoustic), on 13 September 2019. It was produced by English musician Benjamin Fletcher.

== Composition and lyrics ==
It's easy listening. I'm actually kind of addicted to it. I wrote it with a Swedish artist called Erik Hassle. I haven't always enjoyed that process in the past, because I was always so nervous about songwriting with other people and it was such as solitary pursuit. But that fear has gone now.

— Marina commenting on writing "Orange Trees" with Erik Hassle.

Musically, "Orange Trees" is a romantic and "breezy" electropop and indie pop song, with a tropical beat. Lauren Murphy from The Irish Times referred to the beat as an "infectious summer groove". Similarly, John Murphy from musicOMH said the chorus is "suitably summery" when considering the song's lyrical subject matter. Classic Pop's Wyndham Wallace described the genre of the song as "understated electro-pop", while he considered Marina's vocals to sound "demure" and reserved.

According to Musicnotes.com, "Orange Trees" is set in common time and has a moderate tempo of 101 beats per minute. The key of the song is in B major, with Marina's vocal range spanning an entire octave, from F_{3} to G_{4} in scientific pitch notation. Throughout the song's three verses, the vocal range advances in the chord progression of E–F♯–E-F♯–B/D♯. Instrumentation for the song is provided by Hassle, who plays the guitar, and Görres, who plays keyboards and percussion. The song was engineered by John Hanes, while mixed by Serban Ghenea. Marina provided her own background vocals for the song and mastering was handled by Dave Kutch at The Mastering Palace in New York City.

Lyrically, "Orange Trees" uses vivid imagery and serves as "an ode to the beauty of Earth's natural wonders". According to Marina, the song is about the island city of Lefkada in Greece, where her family originated from. Regarding her decision to write a song about the town, she said: "it's my favourite place in the world. I always feel at peace there. It's like my body/biology recognises I’m back home." Lake Schatz from Consequence of Sound summarized the song's message as being "about embracing and becoming one with all the beauty that nature has to offer". Lucas Villa from AXS described the lyrics as "picturesque" and compared them to the ones of "Handmade Heaven". Marina opens the song by singing "O-o-o-orange / O-o-o-orange / O-o-o-orange" over a beat without the use of a sustain pedal. She then transitions into the first verse, where she describes: "I can see the flowers in the greenery / I take a breath of air and I feel free". During the song's bridge, Marina sings "Life is beautiful and now you see / This is how it feels to be free," which Villa felt alluded to a summer romance in Marina's personal life.

== Critical reception ==
Ben Niesen from Atwood Magazine considered "Orange Trees" to be one of the most "'powerful' moments" on Love + Fear and called it "probably the most colourful cut" overall. Lauren Murphy also liked the track, grouping it with several other songs on the album that she felt were "uplifting and empowering". David Renshaw from The Fader raved about the song, describing it as "an upbeat song perfect for sunny days and long, balmy nights". Idolator's Mike Wass was equally positive in his review of the song: "It's achingly lovely and definitive proof that the 33-year-old doesn’t need to be in the depths of despair to make great pop music." The acoustic version of the song was reviewed by several critics. Mike Nied from Idolator described it as his "personal favorite" and the "absolute standout" on Love + Fear (Acoustic). Although Riana Buchman from WRBB was mixed in her review of the EP, she felt "Orange Trees" succeeded as the album's closing track and called it the sole highlight.

The more negative reviews of "Orange Trees" referred to it as boring or unmemorable. NME reviewer Douglas Greenwood provided a mixed review of the song, saying that it "might be more of a swig of Fanta than a sip of fancy San Pellegrino, but there's something about its carefree nature that makes it difficult to hate." In his review of Love + Fear, Peyton Thomas from Pitchfork called the track "anodyne" and preferred album cut "Too Afraid". Also, Nick Lowe from Clash was unimpressed by the track, referring to it as Marina's "half-hearted attempt [at] a chart-topping summer hit".

== Music videos ==
The original music video for "Orange Trees" was directed by English director Sophie Muller, who had previously collaborated with Marina on the video for "Handmade Heaven". The visual was filmed on location in Puerto Vallarta in Jalisco, Mexico at a private villa and beach. It was later announced that the music video would be released at 10:00 AM (PST) on 22 March 2019. Ultimately, it was uploaded to Marina's official YouTube account on the scheduled date. The video opens following Marina as she walks around a beachfront property in Puerto Vallarta. The next scene shows her lounging in an infinity pool with two female friends; for the first chorus, she is joined by her friends on the beach, as they hold hands and dance in the waves. A different shot has Marina posed in a green dress in front of a wall of flowers. Other scenes show her dancing in the sand of the beach in a one-piece swimsuit and standing on a dock while gazing at the surrounding water. Many of the shots in the video were edited with a color filter to bring out a strong orange hue.

Marina performed "Orange Trees" as part of the set list for her Love + Fear Tour in 2019.

Alongside the YouTube release of the music video, it was made available for download via Apple Music on 22 March 2019. Villa wrote a positive review of the visual, calling it a "colorful video". A contributor for Billboard also enjoyed it, writing that the video "positively radiates with summer sunshine" and summarising it as a "feel-good clip". A separate vertical video, also directed by Muller, was created. It features Marina singing the song in an orange dress and a headpiece containing many flowers. The video was eventually uploaded to her YouTube channel on 12 April 2019.

== Live performances ==
In 2019, Marina was featured on NBC's Late Night with Seth Meyers as the guest musical artist, standing as her first appearance on the show since 2015. She appeared on the 8 April episode and performed "Orange Trees" to the audience. Schatz was positive in his review of the performance, writing: "Though the stage itself was without any flora or natural daylight, the London-based artist carried plenty of warmth and spiritual uplift in her body language and, quite literally, in her hair."

The song was also included on the set list for Marina's Love + Fear Tour in 2019. It was performed in between her 2015 single "Froot" and Electra Heart track "Teen Idle" (2012). During this segment of the show, Marina and her background dancers began to engage in more theatrics. Roman Gokhman from Riff, reviewing Marina's show in San Francisco, called the live performance of "Orange Trees" a highlight of the show. He complimented her ability to "bend [...] the tone of her voice to a near vibrato", which he considered a trademark of the older releases in her discography.

== Track listings ==
- Digital download/streaming
1. "Orange Trees" – 3:08
- Digital download – Bearson remix
1. "Orange Trees" (Bearson remix) – 3:02
- Digital download – Claptone remix
1. "Orange Trees" (Claptone remix) – 2:48
- Digital download – Danny Dove remix
1. "Orange Trees" (Danny Dove remix) – 3:04
- Digital download – Michael Goldwasser & Easy Star All-Stars Reggae remix
1. "Orange Trees" (Michael Goldwasser & Easy Star All-Stars Reggae remix) – 3:01
- Promotional CD single
1. "Orange Trees" – 3:08
2. "Orange Trees" (Bearson remix) – 3:02
3. "Orange Trees" (Claptone remix) – 2:47
4. "Orange Trees" (Danny Dove remix) – 3:04
5. "Orange Trees" (Michael Goldwasser & Easy Star All-Stars Reggae remix) – 3:01
- Streaming – Spotify EP edition
1. "Orange Trees" – 3:08
2. "Superstar" – 3:54
3. "Handmade Heaven" – 3:30

== Credits and personnel ==
=== Song ===
Credits adapted from the liner notes of Love + Fear.

- Marina Diamandis – backing vocals, vocals, writer
- Serban Ghenea – mixing
- Oscar Göerres – keys, percussion, producer, programming, writer
- John Hanes – mix engineer
- Erik Hassle – guitar, writer
- Jakob Jerlström – writer
- Dave Kutch – mastering

=== Music video ===
Credits adapted from Marina's YouTube account.

Production

- Prettybird UK – production company

Personnel

- Sophie Muller – director, edit, grade
- Vern Moen – additional editing
- Juliette Larthe – executive producer
- Hannah May – producer
- Mariela Martinez – local producer
- Cesar Rosas – local producer
- Andrea Miranda – production assistant
- Dan Curwin – commissioner
- Daniel Robles – GDL production coordinator
- Adrian Patiño – director of photography
- Ruben Quintero "Pupilo" – Steadicam operator
- Rodrigo León – first AC camera manager
- Victor Andres – electrician
- Edwin Chávez – electrician
- Sierra Galvan – electrician
- René Garcia – data manager
- Mercedes Contreras – stylist
- Derek Yuen – hair
- Katelin Hollenkamp – makeup
- Molly Horne – dancer
- Kayla Watson – dancer
- Andrés Sierra – gaffer
- Jesus Ivan – transport coordinator
- Fletes Sandoval – transport coordinator
- Melitón Guerra – driver
- Victor Velasco – driver

== Release history ==
Release dates and formats for "Orange Trees"
Region	Date	Format(s)	Version	Label(s)	Ref.
United States	22 March 2019	Digital download; streaming	Original	Atlantic	
United States	22 March 2019	Streaming (Spotify EP edition)	Original	Atlantic	
Benelux	22 March 2019	Promotional CD	Original	Atlantic; Warner	
Various	19 April 2019	Digital download; streaming	Danny Dove remix	Atlantic	
Various	31 May 2019	Digital download; streaming	Bearson remix	Atlantic	
Various	7 June 2019	Digital download; streaming	Claptone remix	Atlantic	
Various	14 June 2019	Digital download; streaming	Michael Goldwasser & Easy; Star All-Stars Reggae remix	Atlantic	
