= Karma (Marina song) =

2019 single by Marina

Single by Marina

from the album Love + Fear
- Released: 29 August 2019
- Studio: Club Ralph (London)
- Genre: Pop
- Length: 3:24
- Label: Atlantic
- Songwriter(s): Marina Diamandis; Ben Berger; Ryan McMahon; Jack Patterson; Ryan Rabin
- Producer(s): Jack Patterson; Mark Ralph

Marina singles chronology
"To Be Human" (2019)	"Karma" (2019)	"About Love" (2020)

Music video
- "Karma" on YouTube

"Karma" is a song by Welsh singer and songwriter Marina from her fourth studio album, Love + Fear (2019). Marina's former boyfriend Jack Patterson produced the song alongside Mark Ralph. It was written by Marina, Ben Berger, Ryan McMahon, Ryan Rabin, and Patterson. The song was released for streaming in the United States as the album's fifth and final single on 29 August 2019 by Atlantic Records. Marina was inspired by the Me Too movement and the Harvey Weinstein sexual abuse cases when writing the song, although she was not initially aware of the inspiration. It is a pop song with a tropical beat, which lyrically describes a woman confronting a man, insisting he will eventually receive his karma.

"Karma" received mixed reviews from music critics. Some felt the song recalled Marina's earlier works, while other critics found it unmemorable. An acoustic version of the song was released on Marina's sixth EP, Love + Fear (Acoustic) (2019). A music video using the acoustic version was released in September 2019. Directed by Nikko LaMere, the video features Marina portraying a black-and-white jester who dances. The original version of the song was included on the setlist of her fourth concert tour, the Love + Fear Tour (2019). Marina also performed the song on Jimmy Kimmel Live! in September 2019 as part of a promotional appearance in the US.

== Background and release ==
For proceeding with a new era, Marina announced via Twitter in 2018 that she would be dropping "and the Diamonds" from her stage name in order to release music as just Marina (stylised in all caps). She explained that to Dazed, "It took me well over a year to figure out that a lot of my identity was tied up in who I was as an artist... and there wasn't much left of who I was." After the announcement, Marina released "Baby" with Clean Bandit and Luis Fonsi, her first single under the new name. On 14 February 2019, she announced Love + Fear, her fourth studio album and first as Marina. The track listing for the album was unveiled the same day, revealing "Karma" as the twelfth track on the album and the fourth on the Fear portion of it.

Conceptually, Love + Fear is a double album that is made up of two segments, with each one referring to psychologist Elisabeth Kübler-Ross' theory that humans are only capable of experiencing the aforementioned two emotions. "Karma" appears on the Fear portion of the album, which explores themes such as "being taken advantage of" and sexism. The song was produced by Marina's boyfriend Jack Patterson, of British group Clean Bandit, and Mark Ralph. It was written by Marina, Ben Berger, Ryan McMahon, Ryan Rabin, and Patterson. Marina performed her vocals for the track at Ralph's private home recording studios in London, nicknamed Club Ralph.

"Karma" was released on 26 April 2019, as the twelfth track on Marina's fourth studio album Love + Fear. For its release as a single, the song was sent to music distributor Spotify in the United States for streaming on 29 August 2019, through Atlantic Records. The single release of the song uses the same cover artwork as Love + Fear. An acoustic version of "Karma" was recorded by Marina and featured as the third track on her sixth EP Love + Fear (Acoustic), released on 13 September 2019. The version was produced by English musician Benjamin Fletcher.

== Lyrics and composition ==
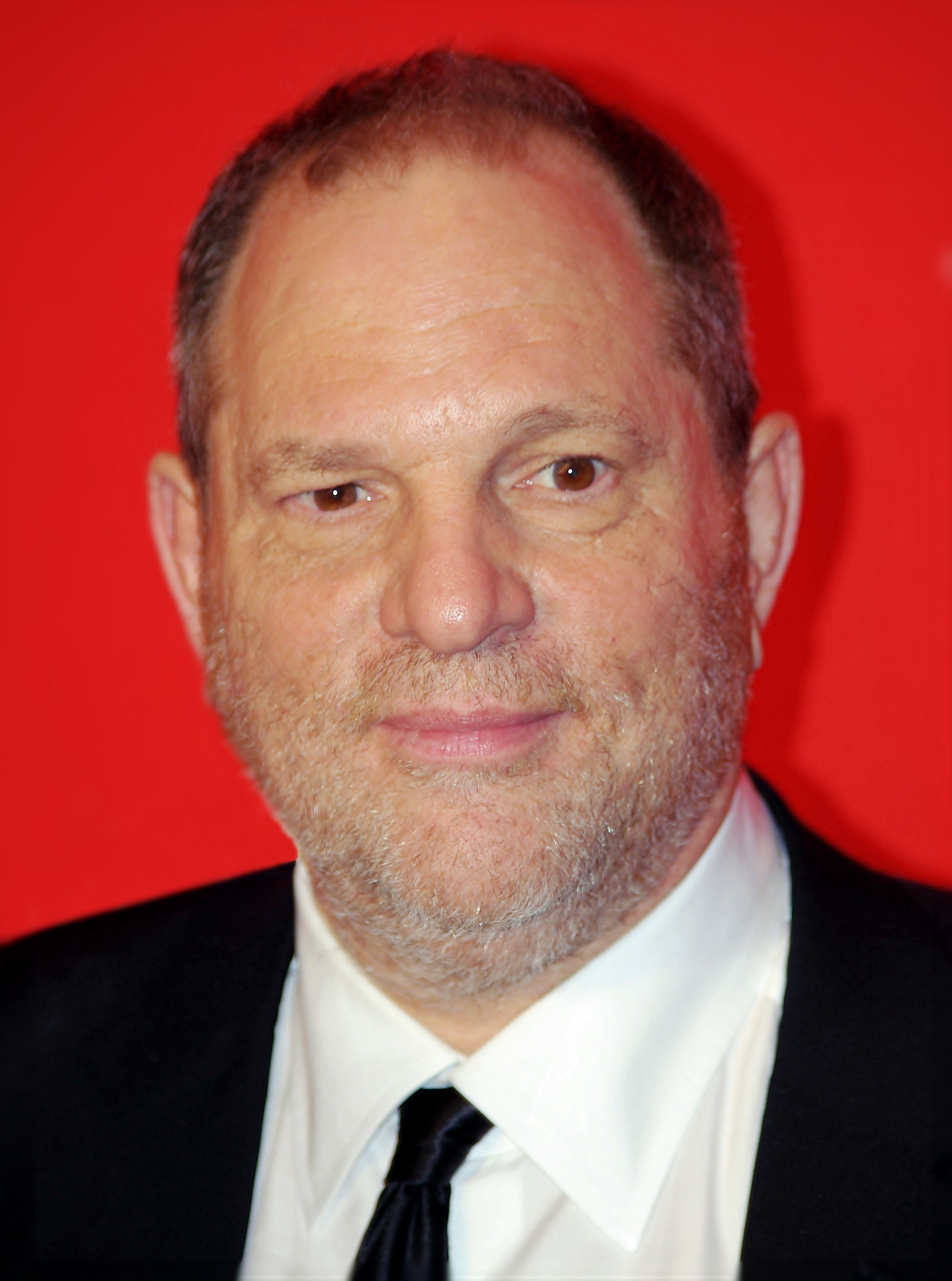
Lyrically, "Karma" was inspired by the sexual abuse cases surrounding American producer and convicted sex offender Harvey Weinstein (shown).

During an interview with Apple Music, Marina revealed the backstories behind each of the 16 tracks on Love + Fear. Regarding "Karma", she stated that the song's lyrical content was subconsciously inspired by the Harvey Weinstein sexual abuse cases and the consequential viral response that came with the Me Too movement. Marina said that the initial idea for the song's subject matter came from a discussion she previously had with her producers regarding various "music industry individuals that were falling from grace." Certain critical commentary discussed how Marina, in 2016, was among several pop artists that stood up in defense of American singer Kesha throughout a lengthy series of lawsuits and countersuits against record producer Dr. Luke; Marina had previously worked with him on her single "Primadonna" (2012) and other songs that are included on her second studio album, Electra Heart (2012). In her interview with Apple Music, Marina continued:

Since that point, there's really been an explosion of cases and experiences that followed the Harvey Weinstein situation. I didn't really think about that in relation to the song for a while, but then when we were reproducing it, it felt so strange. It was interesting going back to the songs, actually.

The lyrics of "Karma" see Marina confronting an enemy with a "told-you-so" attitude as she sings: "I'm like, 'Oh my god / I think it's karma.'" Brittany Spanos from Rolling Stone felt like Marina was describing misogyny in the lyrics, which she noted as a common theme explored on the Fear portion of the album. Musically, "Karma" is a pop song, with a "Mediterranean" tropical-style beat. Marina sings in falsetto, being accompanied by instruments such as the mandolin and ukulele. Stylistically, the original version of the song differed a great deal in comparison to the final edit; Marina compared the original to the catalogue of American band NSYNC and commented: "It was actually really sick. But, alas, it didn't suit the record!"

== Critical reception ==
Imaan Jalali from LA Excites paid special attention to the song's lyrics, writing that they "reiterated Marina's lyrical assertiveness as one who is not to be reckoned with." Abigail Firth of The Line of Best Fit commented that the sound of Love + Fear is drastically different compared to her previous three albums, but admitted that her "signature Marina-isms" and "'oh my god!'s on 'Karma' mean she's not too far from the Marina we came to love a decade ago." Although Ben Niesen from Atwood Magazine called the song "too damnably infectious," he felt that its "menacing" tone fell flat in comparison to Marina's previous releases. The acoustic version of the song was reviewed by Riana Buchman from WRBB, who was less impressed by the song, stating that the new versions of "Karma" and "Superstar" sound like "drab copies of the originals" and ultimately ended up "clutter[ing]" Love + Fear (Acoustic).

== Promotion ==
Marina performing "Karma" while accompanied by two backup singers and a live band during the Love + Fear Tour in September 2019.

A music video for the acoustic version of "Karma" was released to Marina's YouTube channel on 25 September 2019. The video is the final of three to be released for promoting Love + Fear (Acoustic) and was filmed during the last week of August 2019; it was preceded by the acoustic visuals for "Superstar" and "True". All three videos were directed by American photographer Nikko LaMere and produced by AJR Films. The music video depicts Marina as a black-and-white jester that dances and wears an "asymmetrical jumpsuit with frilly cuffs and [a] sparkly corset."

Marina appeared as a musical guest for Jimmy Kimmel Live! on 4 September 2019, where she performed "Karma" in a similar wardrobe as seen in the acoustic version's music video. The performance featured her dancing while near a glowing, white orb. According to Lake Schatz from Consequence of Sound, Marina's appearance on the show was to promote Love + Fear (Acoustic) in addition to the album and her upcoming tour dates for the Love + Fear Tour in the US. He found the performance to be exceptional, writing that "she took the stage exuding confidence and polish," and her "four-year hiatus dedicated to self-discovery appears to have paid off."

"Karma" was included on the set list for Marina's Love + Fear Tour in 2019. During the North American leg of the tour, it was performed within a grouping of songs, including 2015 Froot outtake "I'm Not Hungry Anymore", her 2010 single "Oh No!", and Love + Fear track "No More Suckers". Jalali, reviewing Marina's show at the Greek Theatre in Los Angeles, called her rendition of "Karma" one of the main Love + Fear tracks of the night that "did not disappoint."

== Credits and personnel ==
=== Song ===
Credits adapted from the liner notes of Love + Fear.

- Marina Diamandis – writer, vocals
- Ben Berger – writer
- Ryan McMahon – writer
- Jack Patterson – writer, producer, mixing
- Ryan Rabin – writer
- Mark Ralph – producer, guitar, mandolin, mixing, ukulele
- Tom A.D. Fuller – engineer
- Ross Fortune – assistant engineer
- Dave Kutch – mastering

=== Music video ===
Credits adapted from Marina's YouTube account.

Production

- AJR Films – production company

Personnel

- Nikko LaMere – director
- Russell Tandy – DP
- Derec Dunn – executive producer
- Katia Spivakova – editing
- Emilio Marcelino – gaffer
- Ionel Diaconescu – key grip
- Dennis Haynes – production assistant
- Caleb Boyles – production assistant
