= Superstar (Marina song) =

2021 single by Marina

Single by Marina

from the album Love + Fear
- Released: 1 March 2019
- Studio: Golden Age (Los Angeles)
- Genre: Synth-pop; electro
- Length: 3:54
- Label: Atlantic
- Songwriters: Marina Diamandis; Ben Berger; Ryan McMahon; Ryan Rabin
- Producers: Sam de Jong; Captain Cuts

Marina singles chronology
"Handmade Heaven" (2019)	"Superstar" (2019)	"Orange Trees" (2019)

Music video
- "Superstar" on YouTube

"Superstar" is a song by Welsh singer and songwriter Marina from her fourth studio album, Love + Fear (2019). The song was written by Marina, Ben Berger, Ryan McMahon, and Ryan Rabin, while produced by Sam de Jong and Captain Cuts. It was released for digital download and streaming as the album's second single on 1 March 2019 by Atlantic Records. Marina cited the song as a result of the creative freedom she demanded, lacking from her previous albums, when creating it. It is a synth-pop and electro ballad that was often compared to other releases in Marina's catalogue. A love song, the lyrics describe a couple who have worked hard to achieve a desirable relationship.

"Superstar" received generally mixed reviews from music critics upon release. Depending on the review, Marina's lyrics for the song were either largely appreciated or considered careless. The song was included on the setlist for her fourth concert tour, the Love + Fear Tour (2019). An acoustic version of the song appears on Marina's seventh extended play, Love + Fear (Acoustic) (2019). A music video for the acoustic version was released in September 2019 and directed by Nikko LaMere. It depicts Marina dancing and singing in a dimly lit room, while giving the impression of being underwater.

== Background and release ==
In order to officially begin a new chapter in her career, Marina announced via Twitter in 2018 that she would be dropping "and the Diamonds" from her stage name in order to release music under the mononym Marina (stylised in all caps). She explained that, "It took me well over a year to figure out that a lot of my identity was tied up in who I was as an artist... and there wasn’t much left of who I was." After her announcement, Marina released her first new single under the new name, "Baby" with Clean Bandit. She announced Love + Fear on 14 February 2019, her fourth studio album and first as Marina. The track listing was revealed the same day, which unveiled "Superstar" as the second track on the album.

Conceptually, Love + Fear is a double album that is composed of two segments with each one exploring psychologist Elisabeth Kübler-Ross' theory that humans are only capable of experiencing the aforementioned two emotions. "Superstar" appears on the Love section of the album, which is devoted to songs with lyrics detailing positive thoughts and emotions. Marina also revealed that the song is featured on a part of the album that she specifically asked her record label Atlantic Records to set aside for her. She justified the request, explaining that she had not always had creative control for her previous projects and did not want this to be repeated on Love + Fear. The song was written by Marina, Ben Berger, Ryan McMahon, and Ryan Rabin, while production being handled by Sam de Jong and Captain Cuts. Marina recorded her vocals for the track at Joel Little's Golden Age recording studios in Los Angeles.

"Superstar" was released for digital download and streaming in various countries on 1 March 2019 through Atlantic Records. It served as the second single from Love + Fear, following "Handmade Heaven" earlier in the year. A promotional CD single, intended for radio airplay, was distributed throughout the Benelux region of Europe in 2017 by Atlantic Records and the Warner Music Group. "Superstar" also appears as a bonus track on a Spotify-exclusive extended play for "Orange Trees", the album's subsequent single. An acoustic version of "Superstar" was later recorded and released as the fourth track on Marina's sixth extended play, Love + Fear (Acoustic), on 13 September 2019. It was produced by English musician Benjamin Fletcher.

== Composition and lyrics ==
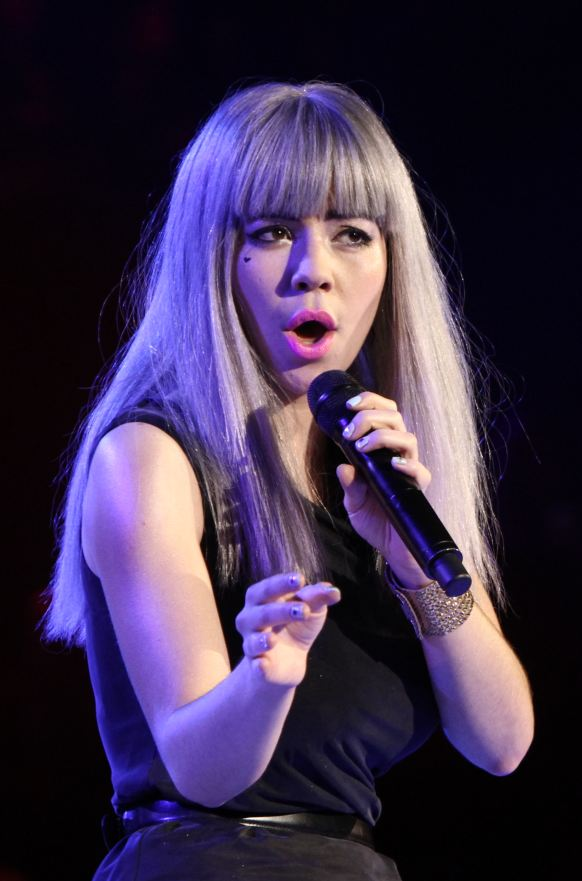
The electro sound of "Superstar" was compared to Marina's second studio album, Electra Heart (2012).

Prior to the release of "Handmade Heaven" in February 2019, Marina revealed on Twitter that the song would have little to no indication of what the rest of Love + Fear would sound like. Musically, "Superstar" is a synth-pop and electro track. A contributor to Billboard described the production as a "shimmering backdrop of pulsating beats and gently sweeping keys". Idolator's Mike Wass compared the electro sound of "Superstar" to the songs on Marina's second studio album Electra Heart (2012). NME reviewer Douglas Greenwood called the track a "synth-driven pop ballad that could soundtrack a dozen sports cars careering off a cliff in a Bond film". Lake Schatz from Consequence of Sound described Marina's vocals on the track as "almost operatic" and noted the understated presence of a piano.

According to the sheet music published at Musicnotes.com, "Superstar" is set in the time signature of common time, and has a moderate tempo of 97 beats per minute. The key of the song is in B minor, with Marina's vocal range spanning from A_{3} to E_{5} in scientific pitch notation, acting as a mezzo-soprano. Throughout the song's verses, her vocal range advances in the chord progression of B–F♯–G-A–F♯-G. Instrumentation for the track is provided by Captain Cuts and de Jong, who contribute with keyboards. The song was mixed by Serban Ghenea at MixStar Studios in Virginia Beach, Virginia, and engineered by John Hanes. Mastering of the track was handled by Dave Kutch at The Mastering Palace in New York City.

Marina has referred to "Superstar" as a "true love song". In an interview with Apple Music, during the release week of Love + Fear, she spoke about the process she went through when writing the song: "I think [...] when your mind is clearer you write sparse, simple songs. I also really like how the song celebrates the hard work that goes into a good relationship." Lauren Murphy from The Irish Times also called it a love song and cited the line, "So impossible to dream when you're far away from me" as evidence. Following an instrumental intro to the song, Marina begins the first verse by singing: "Before I met you, I pushed them all away / Soon as I kissed you, I wanted you to stay". She alternates to, "You never judge me for any of my fears / Never turn your back, always keep my body near" at the beginning of the second verse.

== Critical reception ==
"Superstar" was met with generally mixed reviews from music critics, many of whom discussed the lyrics. A Billboard contributor wrote a positive review of the song, calling it "romantic". Greenwood acclaimed the song, calling attention to the lyrics, and named it a "delicious decoy" on Love + Fear. Wass highlighted the song's lyrics and its "even gushier" chorus. Additionally, he compared the song to several of Marina's prior releases, and considered the combination of elements to be "a very good thing". Allison Stubblebine from Nylon also enjoyed the song and considered her favorite part to be the lyrics, "All of the days that we spend apart / My love is a planet revolving your heart". On the other hand, Peyton Thomas of Pitchfork called the same lyrics "sloppy" and compared its "incoherent" style to a technique first used by Swedish producer and songwriter Max Martin. Ben Niesen from Atwood Magazine said he expected something more from the song, describing its lyrics as generic and a part of "common poetry". Nick Lowe from Clash was unimpressed by the track, writing that it "showcase[s] her excellent songwriting but [is] let down by lacklustre production".

The acoustic version of "Superstar" was also reviewed by critics. Mike Nied of Idolator provided a positive review, writing that Marina "breathes new life" into the song. Riana Buchman from WRBB was less impressed by the song, saying that "Superstar" and "Karma" sound like "drab copies of the originals" and ended up "clutter[ing]" Love + Fear (Acoustic).

== Promotion ==
Marina performing "Superstar" with several backup singers during the Love + Fear Tour in September 2019.

Coinciding with the release of "Superstar" as a single, a lyric video using a looped clip of Marina in a black dress while floating in a pool of water, was released on 1 March 2019. A music video for the acoustic version of the song was later released to Marina's YouTube channel on 13 September of that same year. The video was the first of three released to promote Love + Fear (Acoustic) and was filmed during the last week of August 2019. It was directed by American photographer Nikko LaMere and produced by AJR Films. The video opens with Marina in a dimly lit room, sprawled out on the ground and her hair is arranged in patterns that replicate the shape of a heart symbol. A filter used on the floor gives the appearance that Marina is performing while being underwater.

"Superstar" was also included on the set list for Marina's Love + Fear Tour in 2019. It was performed in between Love + Fear single "To Be Human" and her 2015 single "Froot". Roman Gokhman from Riff, reviewing Marina's show in San Francisco, was mixed about her performance of the song. He called the song "bassy" and wrote that it "didn't really stand out that much from the rest of the set".

== Track listing ==
Digital download/promotional CD single/streaming
No.	Title	Length
1.	"Superstar"	3:54

== Credits and personnel ==
=== Song ===
Credits adapted from the liner notes of Love + Fear.

- Marina Diamandis – writer, vocals
- Ben Berger – writer
- Ryan McMahon – writer
- Ryan Rabin – writer
- Captain Cuts – producer, keys, programming
- Sam de Jong – producer, keys, programming
- Serban Ghenea – mixing
- John Hanes – mix engineer
- Dave Kutch – mastering

=== Music video ===
Credits adapted from Marina's YouTube account.

Production

- AJR Films – production company

Personnel

- Nikko LaMere – director
- Russell Tandy – DP
- Derec Dunn – executive producer
- Shaina Stein – editing
- Emilio Marcelino – gaffer
- Ionel Diaconescu – key grip
- Dennis Haynes – production assistant
- Caleb Boyles – production assistant

== Release history ==
Release dates and formats for "Superstar"
Region	Date	Format(s)	Label(s)	Ref.
Various	1 March 2019	Digital download; streaming	Atlantic	
Benelux	1 March 2019	Promotional CD	Atlantic; Warner	
