= Love + Fear (Acoustic) =

EP by Marina
- Released: 13 September 2019
- Recorded: 2019
- Genre: Acoustic
- Length: 17:46
- Label: Atlantic
- Producer: Benjamin Fletcher

Marina chronology
Love + Fear (2019)	Love + Fear (Acoustic) (2019)	Ancient Dreams in a Modern Land (2021)

Love + Fear (Acoustic) is the third extended play by Welsh singer and songwriter Marina. It was released digitally on 13 September 2019 by Atlantic Records and contains five acoustic versions of songs that originally appeared on Marina's fourth studio album, Love + Fear (2019). The EP was first announced just weeks prior to its release and Benjamin Fletcher serves as the sole producer. While deciding on the track listing for the EP, Marina chose songs from the album that she felt very comfortable with and would translate well when stripped-down.

To promote Love + Fear (Acoustic), Marina appeared as a guest on Jimmy Kimmel Live! in 2019 and music videos for the acoustic versions of "True", "Superstar", and "Karma" were released. The videos were all directed by Nikko LaMere and uploaded to YouTube throughout September 2019. The EP received positive to mixed reviews from music critics, with several of them praising the new version of "Orange Trees". Criticism was aimed at the selection of songs by some, with one reviewer calling it too safe.

== Background and release ==
To mark a new era in her career, Marina stated via Twitter in 2018 that she would be dropping her "and the Diamonds" moniker from her stage name to release music as simply Marina (stylised in all caps), explaining that: "It took me well over a year to figure out that a lot of my identity was tied up in who I was as an artist... and there wasn't much left of who I was." Following the announcement, she released "Baby" with Clean Bandit, her first new single with her new name. She also recorded a fourth studio album, Love + Fear, which was released on 26 April 2019. In support of the album, Marina embarked on the Love + Fear Tour, which debuted on 29 April 2019 at the O2 Academy Newcastle in Newcastle upon Tyne, England.

On 4 September 2019 via Instagram, Marina first announced Love + Fear (Acoustic), a digital extended play that features acoustic versions of songs from Love + Fear. That same day, an official press release by Atlantic Records and Neon Gold Records confirmed her news, with the release describing the EP as a collection of "powerful" stripped-down songs. In an interview with Billboard published on 13 September 2019, Marina stated that the acoustic versions of songs from her previous albums had become popular with fans, which prompted the idea of releasing an acoustic-dedicated EP. Marina also revealed how she determined what songs from Love + Fear were to be re-recorded for Love + Fear (Acoustic), saying:

Well, I think sometimes when the production is more [...] synthetic sometimes some songs don't carry as well acoustically, but I think it's more just to do with the structure of the song and the ease of singing it. Like, it's down to how comfortable I feel singing it, so I've picked songs that felt very natural and easy for me to sing.

Alongside recording the songs for Love + Fear (Acoustic) in 2019, Marina rehearsed the EP's acoustic versions of her songs in preparation for her Love + Fear Tour during autumn. "True", "Superstar", "Karma", "No More Suckers", and "Orange Trees" from Love + Fear were chosen for the final track listing. Atlantic Records sent Love + Fear (Acoustic) to music distributors such as Amazon Music and Apple Music for digital download and streaming on 13 September 2019. English musician Benjamin Fletcher is credited as the EP's sole producer.

== Promotion ==
Marina performing in Minneapolis during the Love + Fear Tour in September 2019.

Following its release in April 2019, Love + Fear received significant hype and attention due to Marina's extended four-year hiatus. Meanwhile, Marina made several promotional media appearances in the United States on late-night talk shows. She appeared as a musical guest for Jimmy Kimmel Live! on 4 September 2019, where Marina performed "Karma" in a similar wardrobe as seen in the accompanying music video. According to Lake Schatz from Consequence of Sound, the appearance on the show was to promote Love + Fear (Acoustic) in addition to the album and her upcoming tour dates for the Love + Fear Tour in the US.

Marina released three music videos for the versions of her songs that appear on the EP. All of the clips were directed by American photographer Nikko LaMere and filmed throughout the last week of August 2019. They were all uploaded to Marina's YouTube channel during the next month. The first visual, accompanying "Superstar", was released alongside Love + Fear (Acoustic) on 13 September. On 16 September, the video for "True" was released. The final music video accompanied "Karma" and was released on 25 September 2019. The clip depicts Marina as a black-and-white jester that dances and wears an "asymmetrical jumpsuit with frilly cuffs and [a] sparkly corset".

== Critical reception ==
Love + Fear was met with mixed to positive reviews from music critics. Mike Nied from Idolator provided a positive review of the EP, writing that Marina "breathes new life into previous single 'Superstar'" and he described the acoustic version of "Orange Trees" as his "personal favorite" and the "absolute standout of the bunch". Allison Stubblebine, writing for Nylon, called the EP a collection of "stripped-down songs" and considered it a surprise release aimed at Marina's fanbase. Riana Buchman from WRBB was somewhat mixed in her review of Love + Fear (Acoustic), giving it three stars out of five. While she enjoyed "Orange Trees" as the closing track of the EP and called it the main highlight, Buchman said it was "cluttered", and songs like "Superstar" and "Karma" sound like "drab copies of the originals"; with her adding: "Although the acoustic EP delivers a more honest and vulnerable Marina, it also reveals the lack of depth in the original album’s lyrics. Without the distracting, loud synth and booming bass, the lyrics emerge as rather simple and cliche."

== Track listing ==
Credits adapted from AllMusic.

Love + Fear (Acoustic) track listing
No.	Title	Writer(s)	Length
1.	"True" (acoustic)	Marina Diamandis; Noonie Bao; Oscar Görres; Oscar Holter	3:19
2.	"Superstar" (acoustic)	Diamandis; Ben Berger; Ryan McMahon; Ryan Rabin	4:02
3.	"Karma" (acoustic)	Diamandis; Berger; McMahon; Jack Patterson; Rabin	3:48
4.	"No More Suckers" (acoustic)	Diamandis; James Flannigan; Alex Hope	3:29
5.	"Orange Trees" (acoustic)	Diamandis; Görres; Erik Hassle; Jakob Jerlstrom	3:08
Total length:			17:46

Notes:

- All tracks produced by Benjamin Fletcher

== Credits and personnel ==
Credits adapted from Tidal.

- Marina Diamandis – writer, lead vocals, backing vocals
- Noonie Bao – writer (track 1)
- Ben Berger – writer (tracks 2, 3), additional keyboards (track 2)
- James Flannigan – writer (track 4), piano (track 4), additional keyboards writer (track 4)
- Oscar Görres – writer (tracks 1, 5)
- Erik Hassle – writer (track 5)
- Oscar Holter – writer (track 1)
- Alex Hope – writer (track 4), piano (track 4), additional keyboards (track 4)
- Jakob Jerlstrom – writer (track 5)
- Ryan McMahon – writer (track 2, 3), additional keyboards (track 2)
- Jack Patterson – writer (track 3)
- Ryan Rabin – writer (track 2, 3), additional keyboards (track 2)
- Benjamin Fletcher – producer, engineer, guitar, percussion, piano
- Kevin Tuffy – masterer
- Jonny Breakwell – mixer, assistant mixer (track 2), assistant mix engineer (tracks 3, 4)
- Daniel Moyler – mixer (tracks 1–4), additional programmer (tracks 2, 3)
- Dan Gretch – additional guitar (track 1), synthesizer (track 1)
- Mark Ralph – mixer (track 5), additional production (track 5), additional guitar (tracks 3, 5)
- Sam de Jong – additional keyboards (track 2)

== Release history ==
Release dates and formats for Love + Fear (Acoustic)
Region	Date	Format(s)	Label	Ref.
Various	13 September 2019	Digital download; streaming	Atlantic	
