= Handmade Heaven =

2019 single by Marina Diamandis

Single by Marina

from the album Love + Fear
- Released: 8 February 2019
- Studio: Golden Age (Los Angeles)
- Genre: Synth-pop; pop; electro
- Length: 3:29
- Label: Atlantic
- Songwriter(s): Marina Diamandis
- Producer(s): Joel Little

Marina singles chronology
| "Baby" (2018) | "Handmade Heaven" (2019) | "Superstar" (2019) |

Music video
- "Handmade Heaven" on YouTube

"Handmade Heaven" is a song recorded and written by Welsh singer and songwriter Marina for her fourth studio album, Love + Fear (2019). The song was produced by Joel Little and serves as Marina's first solo release following a name change in 2018. It was released for digital download and streaming as the album's lead single on 8 February 2019 by Atlantic Records. Two versions of a remix of the song, produced by Irish DJ Krystal Klear, were released in March 2019. The song's lyrics were inspired by climate change and serve as an ode to Marina's passion for nature. Marina chose the track to be the lead single because she felt its sound was distinctive and different from the rest of the album.

Musically, "Handmade Heaven" is a slow-building synth-pop, pop, and electro ballad that was compared to the works of Lana Del Rey, Lorde, and Madonna. Some reviewers described it as a musical departure from her previous releases. The song received generally positive reviews from music critics, who called it a return to form for Marina. It was also described as romantic, poetic, and dreamy. Commercially, the song did not enter the Official Singles Chart in the United Kingdom, but reached the download component chart where it peaked at number 52. It also charted in Scotland and appeared on the official digital charts in France, Greece, and New Zealand.

Two accompanying music videos for "Handmade Heaven" were produced and both released in February 2019. The first one was directed by English director Sophie Muller and filmed in Estonia. It depicts Marina exploring a large forest during the winter. A separate vertical video, featuring different footage from the shoot, was released later in the month. "Handmade Heaven" was included on the setlist of her fourth concert tour, the Love + Fear Tour (2019), and used as the show's opener. A live one-shot video filmed during the COVID-19 pandemic and featuring Marina performing the song on piano was released in May 2020.

== Background and release ==
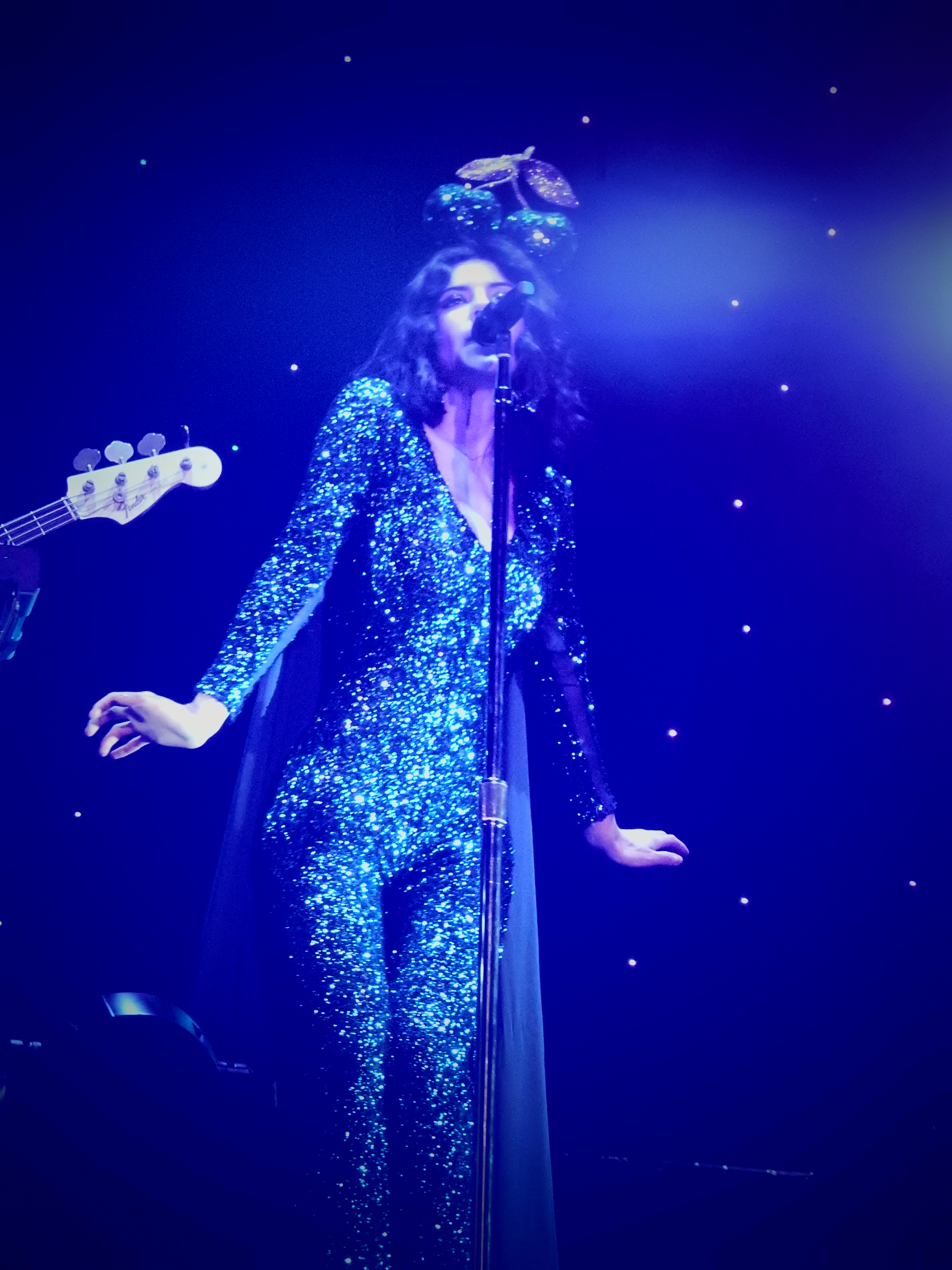
Marina performing during the Neon Nature Tour in February 2016.

To mark the beginning of a new era in her career, Marina stated via Twitter in 2018 that she would be dropping "and the Diamonds" from her stage name in order to release music as just Marina (stylised in all caps). She explained that, "It took me well over a year to figure out that a lot of my identity was tied up in who I was as an artist... and there wasn't much left of who I was." After the announcement, Marina released "Baby" with Clean Bandit, her first single under her new name. Towards the beginning of 2019, "Handmade Heaven" was formally announced to the public. It served as the lead single to her then-upcoming fourth studio album and is her first solo release since "Blue", the fifth and final single from her third album, Froot, in 2015.

On 14 February 2019, Marina announced Love + Fear, her fourth studio album and first under her new moniker. The track listing was unveiled the same day, revealing "Handmade Heaven" as the opening track on the album. Love + Fear serves as a double album that is composed of two segments, with each one exploring psychologist Elisabeth Kübler-Ross' theory that humans are only capable of experiencing the aforementioned two emotions. "Handmade Heaven" appears on the Love portion of the album, devoted to lyrics detailing positive thoughts and emotions, because it was described as a song about finding one's freedom. The song was solely written by Marina and produced by New Zealand musician Joel Little. She recorded her vocals for the track at Little's Golden Age recording studios in Los Angeles. The song was mixed by Dan Greece-Marguerat at Solar Management Limited in London, and engineered by Little. Mastering of the track was handled by Dave Kutch at The Mastering Palace in New York City.

"Handmade Heaven" was released for digital download and streaming in various countries on 8 February 2019 through Atlantic Records. It served as the lead single to Love + Fear and her first new solo release since 2015. A promotional CD single, intended for radio airplay, was distributed throughout the Benelux region of Europe in 2017 by Atlantic Records and the Warner Music Group. Atlantic also distributed a promotional CD of the single across Finland. On 8 March 2019, two versions of a remix produced by Irish DJ Krystal Klear were released to digital music retailers and streaming services. The original remix has a running time of 6 minutes and 57 seconds and was exclusive to Apple Music. For the remix's distribution on Spotify in the United States, a condensed version of the remix lasting 4 minutes and 10 seconds was released instead. The longer version was used in an audio video for the remix that was uploaded to Marina's YouTube account on 11 March 2019.

== Composition and lyrics ==
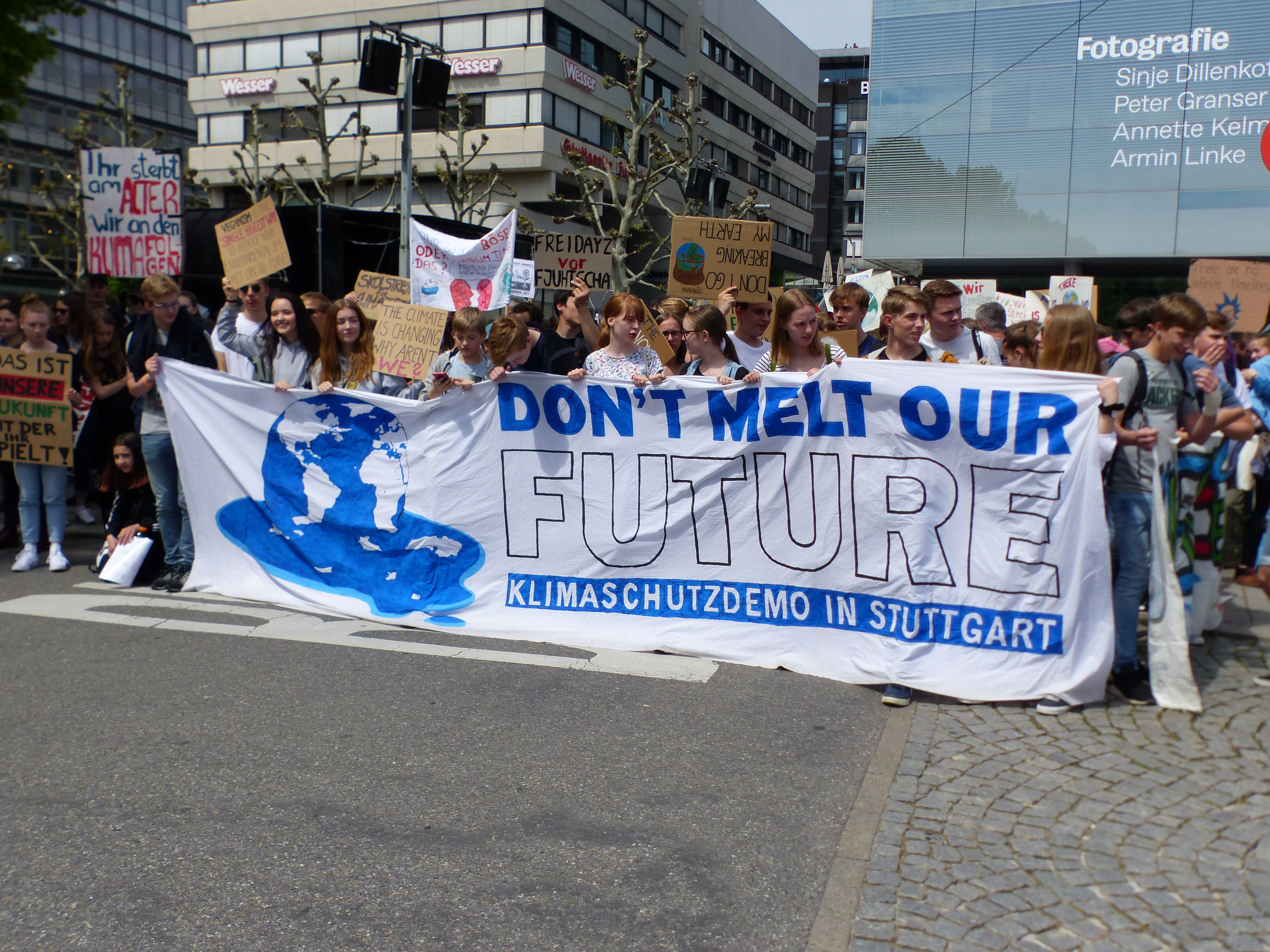
Climate change served as a source of inspiration to Marina when writing "Handmade Heaven".

Musically, "Handmade Heaven" is a slow, "melodramatic" synth-pop, pop, and electro ballad. Upon the release of "Handmade Heaven", Marina stated on Twitter that the song's sound would have little to no indication of what the rest of Love + Fear would be like. The song is an "idyllic [and] pleasant-sounding" track that "promise[s] paradise". Brittany Spanos from Rolling Stone explained that it contains Marina's "distinctive voice" paired alongside synths. She also considered it a musical departure from "the bubblegum pop excess and cheekiness" of her first three albums. Paper's Katherine Gillespie compared the song to the works of Lana Del Rey and Madonna, specifically the latter's seventh studio album Ray of Light (1998). Pranav Trewn from Consequence of Sound likened it to the style of New Zealand singer and songwriter Lorde.

According to the song's sheet music on Musicnotes.com, "Handmade Heaven"" is set in common time and has a moderate tempo of 107 beats per minute. Spanos described this beat as mid-tempo and free of the "bubblegum pop excess and cheekiness of her first three full-length [albums]". In the same vein, Chris Kelly of The Washington Post called it a "stirring, slow motion synth-pop number." The key of the song is in A major, with Marina's vocal range spanning an entire octave, from F_{3} to C_{5} in scientific pitch notation. Throughout the song's three verses, the vocal range advances in the chord progression of E–D–F♯–C♯, along with the use of suspended chords during C♯. Instrumentation for the track is provided by Little, who contributed with keyboards, synths, percussion, and drums.

Lyrically, the song refers to Marina's admiration of nature and the outdoors. In contrast to her prior releases, "Handmade Heaven" is more straightforward and does not reference any priorly created "personas and world-building". During a track-by-track interview for Love + Fear with Apple Music, she revealed that climate change served as a main source of inspiration for the track: "I think people are suddenly becoming more aware of the natural world. And I think that’s quite odd and intense. I’ve had a feeling of longing, or regret that nature isn’t a larger part of my life." Marina opens the song exclaiming: "I envy the birds high up in the trees / They live out their lives so purposefully / I envy the spiders, the squirrels, and seeds / They all find their way automatically". During the refrain, she sings alongside several layers of her own vocals, creating a choir-sounding effect; she coos: "In this handmade heaven, I come alive / Blue birds forever, colour the sky".

== Reception ==
"Handmade Heaven" received positive reviews from music critics, with many of them labelling it as a proper comeback for Marina. Mike Wass from Idolator described it as Marina "at her most poetic and serene" and "achingly pretty". Gab Ginsberg from Billboard applauded the single, calling it "stunning" and lauding her vocals, which he called a "return [...] to her borderline operatic form". Carolyn Bernucca, a writer for Complex magazine, included "Handmade Heaven" in her "Best New Music This Week" column. She wrote that Marina "sounds as divine as her single's title would suggest" and called the song dreamy and romantic. Robin Murray from ClashMusic.com referred to the song as a "bold new single". Kate Nicholson, for The Guardian, was impressed by the song and questioned if its appeal would be enough to make it commercially successful: "Whether other people will ever want to enter it is still open to debate, but her sharply insightful worldview is rare in pop and deserves to be heard." Ben Niesen from Atwood Magazine provided a more mixed review of the song, calling it one of the most "'powerful' moments" on Love + Fear. However, he questioned Marina's sincerity regarding the song's lyrics, explaining that it only succeeds "because the subject matter doesn’t require specificity".

=== Chart performance ===
In the United Kingdom, "Handmade Heaven" did not reach the Official Charts Company's UK Singles Chart, which ranks the country's top 100 most popular songs weekly. However, it did chart on the download component chart during the week of 15 February 2019. It debuted at number 52 on the same ranking where Marina's previous single "Baby" appeared at number 78. Similarly, "Handmade Heaven" entered the Top 100 Sales chart in the UK, where it also debuted and peaked at number 52. It appeared on Scotland's official record chart, also compiled by the Official Charts Company. During the week of 21 February 2019, "Handmade Heaven" peaked at number 46 and served as the week's seventh highest new entry. Elsewhere in Europe, the song debuted at number 92 on Greece's International Digital Singles component chart, compiled by the IFPI. And on France's SNEP charts, the song reached number 196 on the downloads chart during the seventh week of 2019. Outside of Europe, "Handmade Heaven" reached number 25 on New Zealand's Hot Singles chart, according to Recorded Music NZ.

== Music videos ==
The original music video for "Handmade Heaven" was directed by English director Sophie Muller, who would later direct the video for "Orange Trees", the third single from Love + Fear. The clip was produced by Sophie Brooks, headed by Hannah May, and executively produced by Juliette Larthe. It was filmed on location in Estonia, during January 2019. The official announcement for the video revealed that it would debut at 5:00 PM (GMT) on 8 February 2019. Ultimately, the video was uploaded to Marina's YouTube channel at that time. It opens with Marina following a snow-covered path in the middle of a forest, superimposed with clips of her performing the song. She wore an oversized, hooded red jacket and bright red lipstick for the shoot. Other scenes in the video show multi-coloured flowers blooming, Marina gazing in front of a body of water, and Marina singing the song in a now dimly-lit forest landscape.

Marina performing the concert opener "Handmade Heaven" with two backup singers during the Love + Fear Tour in September 2019.

Alongside the YouTube release of the music video, it was made available for download via Apple Music on 8 February 2019. Bailey Calfee from Nylon analysed the video's message, predicting that regardless of where Marina is, she is able to prosper and "find [...] solace in imagining her own paradise". Overall, the video received positive reviews from critics, with Wass calling it "gorgeous". Murray also liked the video, highlighting Muller's striking direction that captures a "fragile, human, but emphatically creative Marina". Estonian production company Nafta posted a behind-the-scenes montage of leftover footage from the video shoot, exclusive to their website. A separate vertical video for "Handmade Heaven", also directed by Muller, was created, featuring Marina singing the song as projections of flowers are transposed over her face. The video was eventually uploaded to her YouTube channel on 19 February 2019.

== Live performances ==
"Handmade Heaven" was also included on the set list for Marina's Love + Fear Tour in 2019. It was selected as the show's opening song. For the performance, as Marina started the show, she began "on a platform in the middle of the stage as the dancers appeared at her wings and performed a sort of gymnastics floor routine". Roman Gokhman from Riff, reviewing Marina's show in San Francisco, felt the performance "could have benefited from having musicians on stage," as he felt her group of backup dancers was inconsistent. Imaan Jalali from LA Excites, who saw her Los Angeles show, lauded the live rendition of "Handmade Heaven", noting how Marina seemed comfortable with the audience which helped reveal her "charmingly compelling personality". Additionally, he considered it a pleasant mood-setter for the evening and described it as "a lovely idyllic piece that is pleasant-sounding and ingratiated Marina to her audience".

In observance of Earth Day in 2020, Marina self-recorded a live performance of "Handmade Heaven" and posted it to her various social media accounts. A month later, she uploaded the clip to her YouTube channel on May 13.

== Track listings and formats ==
Digital download/promotional CD single/streaming
| No. | Title | Length |
|---|---|---|
| 1. | "Handmade Heaven" | 3:29 |

Digital download/streaming – Krystal Klear remix (Apple Music version)
| No. | Title | Length |
|---|---|---|
| 1. | "Handmade Heaven (Krystal Klear remix)" | 6:57 |

Digital download/streaming – Krystal Klear remix (Spotify version)
| No. | Title | Length |
|---|---|---|
| 1. | "Handmade Heaven (Krystal Klear remix)" | 4:10 |

== Credits and personnel ==
=== Song ===
Credits adapted from the liner notes of Love + Fear.

- Marina Diamandis – writer, vocals
- Joel Little – producer, engineer, keyboards, synths, percussion, drum programming
- Dan Grech-Marguerat – mixing, additional programming
- Dave Kutch – mastering

=== Music video ===
Credits adapted from Marina's YouTube account and Nafta.

Production

- Prettybird UK – production company

Personnel

- Sophie Muller – director
- Evgeny Bystrov – DOP
- Juliette Larthe – executive producer
- Hannah May – head of production, EP
- Sophie Brooks – producer
- Helen Lõhmus – line producer
- Sissel-Maria Mägi – production assistant
- Kenn Rull – location manager
- Krisjan Daniel Esko – assistant location manager
- Evgeny Bystrov – DOP
- Kaarel Tiidus – 1st AC, focus puller
- Sanna Rink – DIT
- Indrek Raag – gaffer
- Elle Fell – stylist
- Ben Moth – hair
- Adam de Cruz – makeup

== Charts ==
Chart performance for "Handmade Heaven"
| Chart (2019) | Peak position |
|---|---|
| France Downloads (SNEP) | 196 |
| Greece International Digital Singles (IFPI) | 92 |
| New Zealand Hot Singles (RMNZ) | 25 |
| Scotland (OCC) | 46 |
| UK Singles Downloads (OCC) | 52 |

== Release history ==
Release dates and formats for "Handmade Heaven"
| Region | Date | Format(s) | Version | Label(s) | Ref. |
|---|---|---|---|---|---|
| Various | 8 February 2019 | Digital download; streaming | Original | Atlantic | |
| Benelux | 8 February 2019 | Promotional CD | Original | Atlantic; Warner | |
| Finland | 8 February 2019 | Promotional CD | Original | Atlantic | |
| Various | 8 March 2019 | Digital download; streaming | Krystal Klear remix (Apple Music version) | Atlantic | |
| United States | 8 March 2019 | Streaming | Krystal Klear remix (Spotify version) | Atlantic | |
