= Love + Fear =

- Digital edition cover (Note: Physical editions of the album depict Marina in a different pose, facing forward and with her head inclined.)

Studio album by Marina
- Released: 26 April 2019 (Note: The album's first half Love, including the four previously released singles, was released on 4 April 2019. Fear was released on 26 April 2019.)
- Recorded: 2017–2018
- Studios: Golden Age; Westlake; Comic Sands; Harmony (Los Angeles); Wolf Cousins (Stockholm); Club Ralph; Metropolis; RAK (London)
- Genres: Pop; dance-pop; synth-pop; electropop
- Length: 56:16
- Labels: Atlantic; Neon Gold
- Producers: Sam de Jong; Oscar Görres; Captain Cuts; Joel Little; Jack Patterson; Mark Ralph; James Flannigan; Grace Chatto; Oscar Holter; Alex Hope

Marina chronology
Froot Acoustic EP (2015)	Love + Fear (2019)	Love + Fear (Acoustic) (2019)

Singles from Love + Fear
- 1. "Baby" Released: 2 November 2018; 2. "Handmade Heaven" Released: 8 February 2019; 3. "Superstar" Released: 1 March 2019; 4. "Orange Trees" Released: 22 March 2019; 5. "To Be Human" Released: 8 April 2019; 6. "Karma" Released: 29 August 2019

Love + Fear (stylized as LOVE + ꓤⱯƎℲ) is the fourth studio album by Welsh singer-songwriter Marina Diamandis, and her first under the mononym Marina. It was released in full on 26 April 2019 by Atlantic and Neon Gold Records, though the album's first half was surprise released on 4 April 2019. Marina took a hiatus after she concluded touring in support of her third studio album Froot (2015) with plans to retire from music. However, she began working on a new record with several producers, including Sam de Jong, Oscar Görres, Joel Little, Jack Patterson, Mark Ralph, James Flannigan, and Oscar Holter during its recording.

Musically, Love + Fear has been described musically as a pop, dance-pop, synth-pop, and electropop album with a more commercial sound, in comparison to Marina's previous albums. Conceived as a double album, each half of the album explores the two nominal emotions referenced in the title, according to the theory by psychologist Elisabeth Kübler-Ross. Love + Fear received generally mixed reviews from music critics and debuted at number five on the UK Albums Chart, becoming the singer's fourth consecutive top ten album.

The album was supported by five singles: "Handmade Heaven", "Superstar", "Orange Trees", "To Be Human", and "Karma". It also includes the previously released single "Baby" (2018) with Clean Bandit. The album was announced alongside a tour, which visited the US, Canada, and Europe, which began in April 2019 and concluded in November. An acoustic EP, titled Love + Fear (Acoustic), was released on 13 September 2019.

== Background and production ==
After concluding the Neon Nature Tour in promotion of her third studio album Froot (2015), Marina began writing sessions in Los Angeles for her next record, despite initially dismissing the idea of making a follow-up. In June 2016, she told Fuse that she had begun writing new material for upcoming songs. However, the sessions were cancelled because of her plans to retire from music, in search of new creative inspiration. Speaking to Entertainment Weekly, Marina recalled realising that her passion for music had shifted, saying, "I remember thinking, oh sh—, this doesn't feel the same", and described feeling a growing apathy that made her question her motivation as an artist. She reflected that she no longer needed external validation and wondered, "Why am I doing this, then, if I'm not doing it from a place of ego?" concluding that after three albums, she thought, "that's enough." In another interview, she elaborated that following nearly a decade of work, she had started to feel that too much of her sense of self was tied to her artistic identity, which led her to temporarily step back from music and focus on reconnecting with herself. Marina cited her struggles with depression and stress due the loss of her aunt and her grandmother during promotion for Froot as the main reasons of her near retirement. She also experienced writer's block, which led her to take acting classes. However, Marina left those classes and enrolled at the University of London where she studied psychology for six months. She described the experience as a way to explore another passion and "feel like a human being again", noting that her long-term obsession with being an artist since the age of 15 had consumed much of her life.

Three months after finishing the course, the singer returned to the studio and continued with the songwriting of her fourth album from early 2017 to summer 2018. Some of the songs made before her break were initially instrumented only by piano but were reworked after Marina "[fell] back in love with them." The singer was inactive in social media during her hiatus, though she uploaded content occasionally. In December 2016, electronic group Clean Bandit confirmed that "Disconnect", a song they had performed with Marina at the 2015 Coachella Valley Music and Arts Festival, would be released on their new album; it was released as a single in June 2017 and she performed it with them at Glastonbury. When Marina thought in May 2018 that the album was already finished, she wrote several songs in a trip to Sweden.

To mark a new stage in her career, Marina announced via Twitter in 2018 that she would be dropping her "and the Diamonds" moniker to release music as "Marina" (stylised in all caps), explaining that "It took me well over a year to figure out that a lot of my identity was tied up in who I was as an artist... and there wasn't much left of who I was." She later elaborated that returning to songwriting felt deeply personal, saying that it was as if "something had cleared" within her. Marina explained that continuing under the name "Marina and the Diamonds" felt like constructing an artificial idea of herself, adding that she no longer wanted to be "locked behind a persona" or tied to the pop star concept of a tightly defined "era". Instead, she emphasised a desire to feel "more human", stating that there was "no concept other than love and fear."

In November 2018, a second collaboration with Clean Bandit and Puerto Rican singer Luis Fonsi, "Baby", was released, peaking at number 15 in the UK. It was revealed that the song would also be included on the album. In July 2018, Marina said she was going to Los Angeles to finish the production of Love + Fear. The album was mixed and finished in December 2018. In an interview in June 2019, the singer spoke about the conception of the title and stated:

"I think [Love + Fear] can both be motivating forces... I mean there's a reason why we feel fearful - it's from evolutionary reasons. We need fear to survive, we need love but... I think because this whole chapter of my life has had like a psychological backdrop it was a very fitting universal title. I didn't write with this concept in mind I just wrote ready freely. I didn't even know if I was going to do an album I was just writing for the joy of it and then at the end I was like what should I name it? ... I went through and so what the main themes were... [Love + Fear] kept jumping out on me."

Marina collaborated with several songwriters and producers during the album's production, most of them with close ages to the singer, unlike in her second studio album Electra Heart (2012), where most collaborators were older than her. When asked about the collaborations, she said, "It's really important as a writer to feel like I'm excited about doing new things... that's why I collaborated a lot on this record... 'Orange Trees', I never would've wrote on my own".

== Music and lyrics ==
Love + Fear has been described as a subdued, pop, dance-pop, synth-pop, and electropop record. Marina described the album as a "contemporary pop record". Its production was characterised as "pristine", with booming synth lines and beat-driven ballads. Jeffrey Davies of PopMatters classified the album as "likely her most commercial attempt to date". Marina described the songwriting in the album to be more honest and direct in comparison to her previous works. Love + Fear is a double album that is split into two eight-track collections (Love and Fear), with each collection exploring psychologist Elisabeth Kübler-Ross' theory that humans are only capable of experiencing the nominal two emotions: love and fear. According to a statement, Love was said to deal with a "longing to enjoy life", while Fear would address themes of gender inequality, insecurity, and the desire to understand one's purpose. Marina elaborated on this, quoting Kübler-Ross: "There are only two emotions: Love and Fear. All positive emotions come from love, all negative emotions from fear. We cannot feel these two emotions together, at exactly the same time. They're opposites."

=== Songs ===
"Handmade Heaven"
A sample from "Handmade Heaven", illustrating the introspective tone and themes of self-reflection that marked Marina's transition into the Love + Fear era

Love + Fear opens with "Handmade Heaven", which was described as a musical departure from "the bubblegum pop excess and cheekiness" of Marina's first three albums. Lyrically, the song refers to her admiration of nature and the outdoors. In a track-by-track interview for Love + Fear with Apple Music, she revealed that climate change served as a main source of inspiration for the track. During the refrain, she sings alongside several layers of her own vocals, creating a choir-sounding effect; she coos: "In this handmade heaven, I come alive / Blue birds forever, colour the sky". "Superstar" is a synth-pop and electro track that was compared to the sound of Marina's second studio album Electra Heart (2012). The track upholds triumphant, unconditional love and reflects the overarching ethos of the album's Love half. Lake Schatz from Consequence described her vocals on the track as "almost operatic" and noted the understated presence of a piano. The singer referred to "Superstar" as a "true love song" that "celebrates the hard work that goes into a good relationship". "True" continues this theme of affection and connection, expanding upon the surface-level idea of love introduced earlier in the record. "Enjoy Your Life" is an indie-pop track driven by rhythmic percussion and Marina's soothing vocals, culminating in a simple reminder to "enjoy your life."

"Orange Trees" uses vivid imagery and serves as "an ode to the beauty of Earth's natural wonders". According to Marina, the song is about the island city of Lefkada in Greece, where her family originated from. It finds peace in the waves of her native Greek isle, further contributing to the serene and optimistic tone of Love. "To Be Human" has been described as one of the standout tracks on Love + Fear. Though it appears on the Love side, it could have easily fit within Fear, and has been cited as the album's dramatic political centerpiece. The accompanying music video features Marina performing against a lush, green backdrop while singing about distant places and cities she has visited, emphasising the shared humanity that connects them. In a video posted to her Twitter account, the singer explained that the song was inspired by contemporary political divisions, stating that "in our political climate we are constantly being made to see other people as 'other'", and that she wrote the song as a response to that mindset, which she described as "a sad way to see humanity". Regarding "Karma", she stated that the song's lyrical content was subconsciously inspired by the Harvey Weinstein sexual abuse cases and the consequential viral response that came with the Me Too movement. Marina said that the initial idea for the song's subject matter came from a discussion she previously had with her producers regarding various "music industry individuals that were falling from grace." The lyrics of the song see Diamandis confronting an enemy with a "told-you-so" attitude as she sings: "I'm like, 'Oh my god / I think it's karma.'" Brittany Spanos from Rolling Stone felt like Marina was describing misogyny in the lyrics, which she noted as a common theme explored on the Fear portion of the album. Love + Fear closes with "Soft to be Strong", a piano ballad where the singer seeks kindness as a strength; Kate Solomon of The Independent found the track to be "a worthy message to close an album that probes metallic emotions and deep, universal insecurities."

== Release and promotion ==
On 31 January 2019, Marina teased the album by posting a picture on social media with the caption "8 Days". A day after, she revealed in an interview the new album would come out some time in early 2019. On 6 February, it was revealed the title of the lead single of the album would be entitled "Handmade Heaven". A few weeks before the album's release, Marina premiered the song along with its accompanying music video, but cautioned fans not to view it as representative of the overall sound or tone of the record. The album and two cover artworks were announced through her Instagram on 14 February, with Diamandis revealing it comprised "two 8-track collections that form a set". On 4 April, Diamandis released the album's first half, Love, as a surprise. Four days later, she publicly performed the song "Orange Trees" for the first time on Late Night With Seth Meyers. On 4 September, she performed the single "Karma" on Jimmy Kimmel Live!. All singles released prior to "Karma" were part of the album's first half, Love.

=== Singles ===
"Handmade Heaven" was released as the lead single on digital platforms on 8 February 2019. A music video for the track directed by Sophie Muller was released concurrently with the song. On 1 March, "Superstar" was released as the second single. Its lyric video was released on the same day, featuring an upside-down Marina partially submerged in a clear pool of water as the lyrics appear across the screen. The third single, "Orange Trees", was released on 22 March, alongside the music video. It was shot in Puerto Vallarta, Mexico, and directed by Muller. "To Be Human" is the fourth single from the album, which was released on 8 April with the release of its music video. The fifth and last single, "Karma", was released on 29 August.

=== Tour ===
Love + Fear Tour
- Tour by Marina
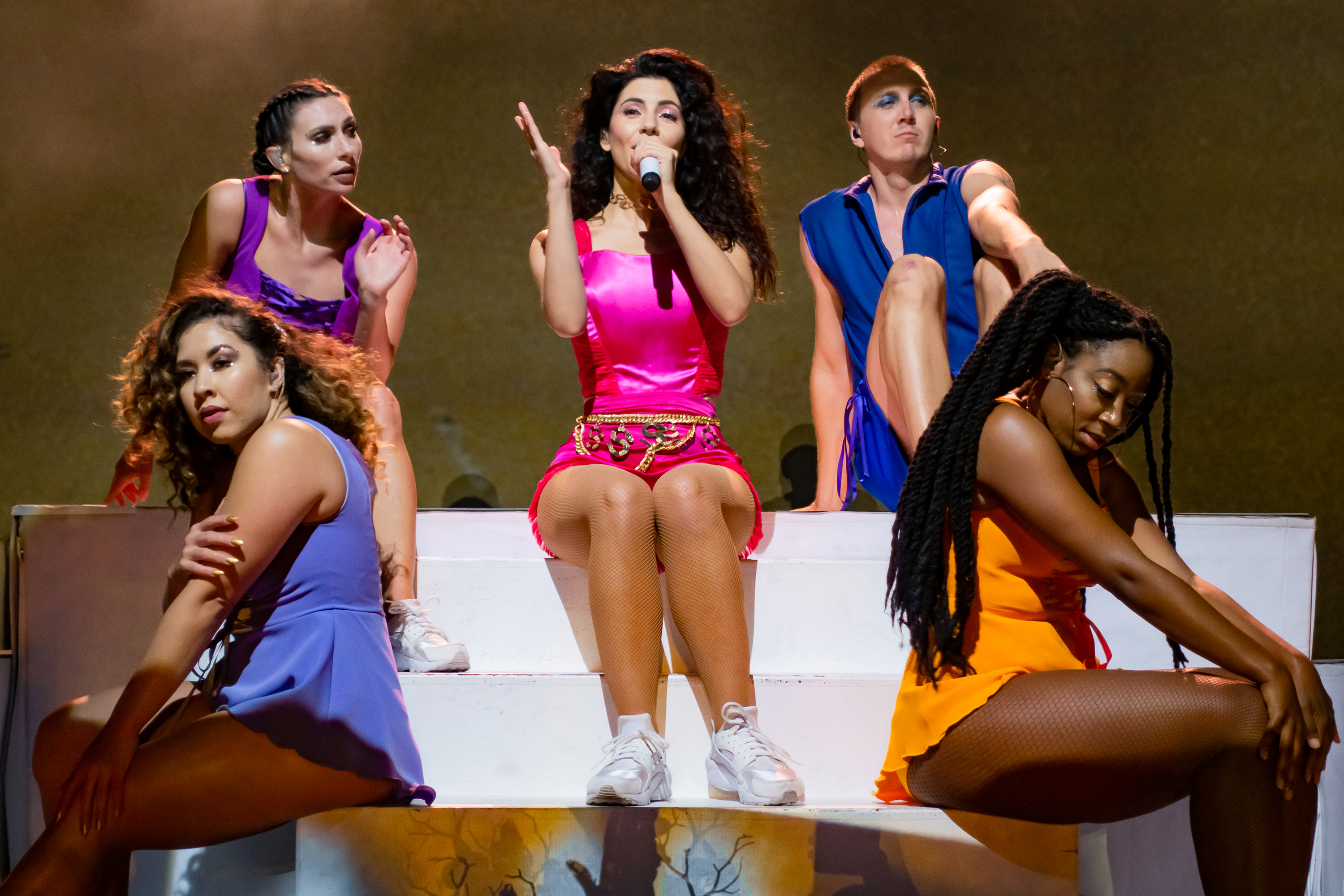
- Diamandis performing in Los Angeles as a part of the Love + Fear Tour (4 October 2019)
- Associated album: Love + Fear
- Start date: 29 April 2019
- End date: 18 November 2019
- Legs: 3
- No. of shows: 48
- Supporting acts: Daya; Broods; Allie X

Marina concert chronology
- Neon Nature Tour (2015–16); Love + Fear Tour (2019); Ancient Dreams in a Modern Land Tour (2022)

The Love + Fear Tour was a concert tour in support of the album, running from 29 April to 18 November 2019, which began in Newcastle, United Kingdom, and included stops in cities such as Glasgow, London, Birmingham, and Manchester. The North American leg commenced in September 2019, featuring performances in Toronto, Montréal, New York City, Chicago, Los Angeles, San Francisco, and other major cities across the United States and Canada. Supporting acts of the tour were Daya, Broods and Allie X.

During the summer of 2019, Marina also appeared at several major European festivals, including Open'er Festival in Poland, Roskilde Festival in Denmark, Ruisrock Festival in Finland, Mad Cool Festival in Spain, NOS Alive in Portugal, Benicàssim Festival in Spain, and Latitude Festival in the United Kingdom.

== Critical reception ==
Professional ratings
Aggregate scores
Source	Rating
AnyDecentMusic?	5.4/10
Metacritic	62/100
Review scores
Source	Rating
AllMusic	4/5 stars
Clash	7/10
Dork	4/5 stars
The Independent	3/5 stars
The Line of Best Fit	7/10
MusicOMH	3/5 stars
NME	3/5 stars
Pitchfork	5.4/10
Q	2/5 stars
The Irish Times	3/5 stars

Love + Fear received generally mixed reviews from contemporary music critics. At Metacritic, which assigns a weighted mean rating out of 100 to reviews from mainstream critics, the album received an average score of 62 based on eight reviews, indicating "generally favourable reviews". Another music-aggregator AnyDecentMusic? gave it 5.4 out of 10, based on their assessment of the critical consensus.

Neil Z. Young from AllMusic noted that Love + Fear represents "a new stage" in Marina's career, highlighting her refined confidence and emotional maturity. He praised the Love half for its bright dance-pop and synth-pop production that embraces peace and self-acceptance, while the Fear half delves into anxiety and existential reflection with polished, introspective pop textures. Clash editor Nick Lowe added that Love + Fear serves as an ambitious conceptual project, though its execution sometimes feels uneven. The Love side was described as leaning too heavily into mainstream pop conventions, occasionally losing Marina's distinct artistic identity, whereas Fear was regarded as stronger in both emotion and lyrical depth. Stephen Ackroyd of Dork similarly remarked that Marina has "cast aside personas and protective shields", calling the record "one of the best in the game at her most open and honest". Ackroyd also noted that even the heavier moments maintain a sense of resilience and clarity. The Independent's Kate Solomon said that Marina has never shied away from a concept, comparing Love + Fear to her previous albums Electra Heart and Froot. The autor further noted Love mixes joy, anxiety, and self-help affirmations over Latin beats and sparse synth undertones, while Fear embraces insecurities and the weirdness of life, ultimately still seeking love. Firth Abigail of The Line of Best Fit said that by removing part of her stage name and using a stripped-down album cover, Marina aimed for a more authentic presentation. He further noted that this genuine approach is evident on several tracks, though the absence of her former personas makes some collaborations, such as with Clean Bandit, feel somewhat awkward. NME author Douglas Greenwood said that the Fear emphasises anxiety and self-doubt, which can make some tracks feel less confident in their sonic execution. Greenwood added that despite the sombre mood and conventional rhyming schemes, moments of inventive production and spirited tracks provide relief. NME concluded that while the album may lack high-energy pop bangers, it demonstrates Marina's autonomy and commitment to making music on her own terms. Stereoboard editor Milly McMahon described Love + Fear as an ambitious double album contrasting two emotional halves, noting that its first section recalls Marina's earlier pop-leaning sound.

In December 2019, The Irish Times's Louise Bruton listed "Soft to Be Strong" among the Best International Songs of 2019.

== Commercial performance ==
Love + Fear debuted at number five on the UK Albums Chart, becoming Diamandis' fourth consecutive top-ten album. The album also entered the top ten in Scotland, where it peaked at number four. In other European countries, it reached number 17 in Ireland, number 18 in Germany, number 19 in Austria, number 20 in Switzerland, and number 24 in Spain. It also charted within the top 50 in the Netherlands, Poland, the Czech Republic, and Belgium's Flanders region.

In other territories, the album peaked at number 22 on the Australian Albums Chart, number 28 on the Billboard 200 in the United States, number 31 in New Zealand, and number 32 in Canada. It also reached number 84 in Belgium's Wallonia region, number 90 in Slovakia, and number 136 in France.

== Track listing ==
Love
No.	Title	Writer(s)	Producer(s)	Length
1.	"Handmade Heaven"	Marina Diamandis	Joel Little	3:30
2.	"Superstar"	Diamandis; Benjamin Berger; Ryan McMahon; Ryan Rabin	Sam de Jong; Captain Cuts	3:54
3.	"Orange Trees"	Diamandis; Kaj Hassle; Jakob Jerlstrom; Oscar Görres	Görres	3:08
4.	"Baby" (Clean Bandit featuring Marina and Luis Fonsi)	Jack Patterson; Camille Purcell; Jason Evigan; Diamandis; Matthew Knott; Luis Lopez-Cepero	Patterson; Grace Chatto; Mark Ralph	3:25
5.	"Enjoy Your Life"	Diamandis; Jonnali Parmenius; Oscar Holter	Holter; Görres	3:36
6.	"True"	Diamandis; Parmenius; Holter; Görres	Görres	3:29
7.	"To Be Human"	Diamandis	Little	4:06
8.	"End of the Earth"	Diamandis; Joseph Janiak; James Flannigan	Flannigan	3:41
Total length:				28:32

Fear
No.	Title	Writer(s)	Producer(s)	Length
9.	"Believe in Love"	Diamandis; Görres	Görres	3:33
10.	"Life Is Strange"	Diamandis; Little	Little	3:17
11.	"You"	Diamandis; Patterson; Janiak	Patterson; de Jong	3:32
12.	"Karma"	Diamandis; Patterson; Berger; McMahon; Rabin	Patterson; Ralph	3:24
13.	"Emotional Machine"	Diamandis; Georgia Nott; Caleb Nott; de Jong	de Jong	3:16
14.	"Too Afraid"	Diamandis; Justin Parker	de Jong	3:23
15.	"No More Suckers"	Diamandis; Alexandra Robotham; Flannigan	Alex Hope; Flannigan	3:15
16.	"Soft to Be Strong"	Diamandis; Richard Nowels Jr.	de Jong	3:47
Total length:				27:27

=== Notes ===
- The CD version of the album includes a version of "Baby" (3:42) with a guitar intro before Luis Fonsi's opening lines.
- The vinyl version of the album includes a version of "Baby" (3:41) which only features Marina and includes a guitar intro.
- "Emotional Machine" features uncredited vocals by Broods.

== Personnel ==
Credits were adapted from the liner notes and Tidal.

Recording locations

- Golden Age; Los Angeles (1, 2, 7, 10, 11, 13, 14, 16)
- Westlake Studios; Los Angeles (4)
- Comic Sands; Los Angeles (8, 15)
- Harmony Studios; Los Angeles (13, 14)
- Wolf Cousins Studios; Stockholm (3, 5, 6, 9)
- Club Ralph; London (4, 12)
- Metropolis Studios; London (4)
- RAK Studios; London (4)

=== Love ===
Musicians

- Marina – lead vocals (1–3, 5–8), featured vocals (4), backing vocals (3, 5, 6)
- Clean Bandit – lead artist (4)
- Luis Fonsi – featured vocals (4)
- Joel Little – keyboards (1, 7), drum programming (1, 7), percussion (1, 7), synthesizer (1, 7)
- Captain Cuts – keyboards (2), programming (2)
- Sam de Jong – keyboards (2), programming (2)
- Oscar Görres – keyboards (3, 5, 6), programming (3, 5, 6), percussion (3, 5, 6), guitar (5, 6), bass (5)
- Jack Patterson – keyboards (4), guitar (4)
- Oscar Holter – keyboards (5), programming (5), percussion (5), guitar (5), bass (5)
- James Flannigan – keyboards (8), programming (8), percussion (8), drums (8), violin (8)
- Luke Patterson – piano (4), percussion (4), additional drums (4), trumpet (4)
- Dan Grech-Marguerat – programming (5, 6, 8), additional programming (1)
- Erik Hassle – guitar (3)
- Mark Ralph – guitar (4)
- Nakajin – acoustic guitar (4)
- Grace Chatto – bass (4)

Technical

- Joel Little – engineering (1, 7)
- Sam de Jong – engineering (2)
- Alex Robinson – engineering (4)
- Jack Patterson – engineering (4)
- Mike Horner – engineering (4)
- Ray Charles Brown Jr – engineering (4)
- Ross Fortune – engineering (4)
- Tom AD Fuller – engineering (4)
- James Flannigan – engineering (8)
- Greg Eliason – assistant engineering (4)
- Dan Grech-Marguerat – mixing (1, 5, 6, 8)
- Serban Ghenea – mixing (2, 3)
- Jack Patterson – mixing (4)
- Mark Ralph – mixing (4)
- Geoff Swan – mixing (7)
- John Hanes – mix engineering (3), assistant mix engineering (2)
- Niko Batistini – assistant mix engineering (7)
- Dave Kutch – mastering (1–3, 5–8)
- Matt Deutchman – coordinating (8)

=== Fear ===
Musicians

- Marina – lead vocals (1–8), backing vocals (1)
- Joel Little – drum programming (2), keyboards (2), percussion (2), synthesizer (2)
- Oscar Görres – backing vocals (1), keyboards (1), percussion (1), programming (1), ukulele (1)
- Sam de Jong – keyboards (3, 5, 6, 8), programming (3, 5, 6, 8), guitar (6, 8), bass (8), drums (8)
- Mark Ralph – guitar (4), mandolin (4), ukulele (4)
- Caleb Nott – bass (5), percussion (5)
- Dan Grech-Marguerat – programming (5, 6, 8), additional programming (7)
- Georgia Nott – piano (5)
- Alex Hope – drum programming (7), keyboards (7), percussion (7), piano (7), programming (7)
- James Flannigan – keyboards (7), percussion (7), piano (7), programming (7)

Technical

- Dave Kutch – masterering (1–8)
- Joel Little – engineering (2)
- Niko Batistini – assistant mix engineering (1–3)
- Geoff Swan – mixing (1–3)
- Mark Ralph – mixing (4)
- Sam de Jong – engineering (5, 6, 8)
- Jack Patterson – mixing (4)
- Ross Fortune – assistant mix engineering (4)
- Tom AD Fuller – assistant mix engineering (4)
- Dan Grech-Marguerat – mixing (5–8)
- Matt Deuthman – coordinating (7)
- James Flannigan – engineering (7)

== Charts ==
Chart performance
Chart (2019)	Peak position
Australian Albums (ARIA)	22
Austrian Albums (Ö3 Austria)	19
Belgian Albums (Ultratop Flanders)	59
Belgian Albums (Ultratop Wallonia)	84
Canadian Albums (Billboard)	32
Czech Albums (ČNS IFPI)	50
Dutch Albums (Album Top 100)	43
French Albums (SNEP)	136
German Albums (Offizielle Top 100)	18
Irish Albums (IRMA)	17
New Zealand Albums (RMNZ)	31
Polish Albums (ZPAV)	44
Scottish Albums (Official Charts)	4
Slovak Albums (ČNS IFPI)	90
Spanish Albums (Promusicae)	24
Swiss Albums (Schweizer Hitparade)	20
UK Albums (Official Charts)	5
US Billboard 200	28

== Release history ==
Release history
Region	Date	Format	Label	Ref.
Various	26 April 2019	CD; digital download; LP; streaming	Atlantic; Neon Gold	
