= Disconnect (Clean Bandit and Marina and the Diamonds song) =

Single by Clean Bandit and Marina and the Diamonds
- Released: 23 June 2017
- Recorded: 2015
- Genre: Pop; dance
- Length: 4:12
- Label: Atlantic
- Songwriters: Harvey Mason Jr.; Marina Diamandis; Jack Patterson
- Producers: Luke Patterson; Jack Patterson; Mark Ralph

Clean Bandit singles chronology
| "Symphony" (2017) | "Disconnect" (2017) | "I Miss You" (2017) |

Marina and the Diamonds singles chronology
| "Blue" (2015) | "Disconnect" (2017) | "Baby" (2018) |

Audio video
- "Disconnect" on YouTube

"Disconnect" is a song by English electronic music group Clean Bandit and Welsh singer and songwriter Marina Diamandis, under the stage name Marina and the Diamonds. It was composed by Diamandis and Jack Patterson, with the song's production handled by Luke Patterson, Jack Patterson, and Mark Ralph. It was released to digital retailers on 23 June 2017. The song became Diamandis' first single since her 2015 album Froot, and her last as Marina and the Diamonds; she currently uses the mononym Marina on further releases.

"Disconnect" is a pop and dance song that was described as a "gloomy, disco-tinged anthem about the loneliness of modern life." The track was performed two years prior to its release at the 2015 Coachella Valley Music and Arts Festival. It received positive reviews from music critics, most of them praising its production. Commercially, the song did not enter the Official Singles Chart in the United Kingdom, but reached the download component chart where it peaked at number 72. It also charted in Scotland, Israel, and Belgium.

== Background ==
Clean Bandit and Marina and the Diamonds first performed the song two years prior at the 2015 Coachella Valley Music and Arts Festival. In an interview by Idolator, when asked about the unreleased song, Grace Chatto said: "That song with Marina and the Diamonds is a really special song for us, but since we performed it live at Coachella we've been trying out different directions for the production. Now we're kind of thinking we might go back to the original, so there was no need for anyone to wait two years!" Jack Patterson said: "It's like maybe 30 different versions of it on my laptop. I think we've finished one, actually — I was working on it on the way [to New York] on the plane, so I think we're going to have a nice surprise for them soon."

Marina and the Diamonds tweeted the band to inquire about the song's release date on 1 June 2016. Chatto explained in an interview with BBC News that the song "had been through several permutations before they got it right". Clean Bandit wrote in a tweet that this official release is a "finished studio version".

== Composition ==
"Disconnect" is a pop and dance song that was described as a "gloomy, disco-tinged anthem about the loneliness of modern life."

== Critical reception ==
Mike Wass of Idolator wrote that the collaboration "packs quite a punch". Sam Damshenas of Gay Times regarded the song as "a certified pop banger / smash / future summer anthem". Patrick Crowley of Billboard magazine wrote that the song was "worth the wait".

== Credits and personnel ==
Credits adapted from Tidal.

- Marina and The Diamonds – composer, vocalist
- Jack Patterson – composer, producer, engineer, mixer, pianist, synthesizer player
- Luke Patterson – producer, drummer
- Mark Ralph – producer, mixer
- Stuart Hawkes – mastering engineer
- Anthony Leung – engineer
- Drew Smith – engineer, assistant
- Grace Chatto – cellist
- Beatrice Philips – violinist
- Braimah Kenneh-Mason – violinist

== Charts ==
Chart performance for "Disconnect"
| Chart (2017) | Peak position |
|---|---|
| Belgium Dance (Ultratop Flanders) | 49 |
| Israel International Airplay (Media Forest) | 5 |
| Scotland Singles (OCC) | 67 |
| UK Singles Downloads (OCC) | 72 |
| US Hot Dance/Electronic Songs (Billboard) | 31 |
