= Happy (Marina and the Diamonds song) =

Single by Marina and the Diamonds

from the album Froot
- Released: 12 December 2014
- Genre: Pop
- Length: 4:04
- Label: Atlantic
- Songwriter(s): Marina Diamandis
- Producer(s): David Kosten; Marina Diamandis

Marina and the Diamonds singles chronology
"Froot" (2014)	"Happy" (2014)	"I'm a Ruin" (2015)

Music video
- "Happy" on YouTube

"Happy" is a song by Welsh singer-songwriter Marina Diamandis, professionally known as MARINA and formerly as Marina and the Diamonds. It is the opening track on her third album, Froot, and was released on 12 December 2014 as the second song from her "Froot of the Month" campaign, which was the monthly release of a new song up until the album's release. An acoustic video for the song was released on 18 December 2014. The song also serves as the second official single from the album.

== Background and composition ==
"Happy" was written by Diamandis, and is an airy pop ballad. It follows the topic of her battle to find happiness. Diamandis said, "It would've been easy" to choose "Happy" as the lead single over a song like "Froot" that many people may not have liked, but she felt "It would've been too predictable". The song was released at midnight for those who had pre-ordered the album, meaning some countries such as Australia and New Zealand received the track hours before the song premiered on YouTube on 12 December.

== Music video ==
The song initially premiered as an audio video on YouTube. The video was an animation of fruit slowly rotating in front of a backdrop of animated space. The track amassed over half a million views in a day. As of September 2022 Happy has amassed over 5.7 million YouTube views.

On 18 December an acoustic video for "Happy" was released. The video features Diamandis dressed in a gold robe, and her band, whose faces are obscured, performing the track in an infinity room lit by blue light. The video was directed by Paul Caslin, who directed all the acoustic Froot videos.

== Reception ==
The song received critical acclaim from reviewers. Bradley Stern from Idolator called the track a "gentle, soul-searing ballad" with an "underlying message of hope". Michael Cragg of The Guardian said the track sounded "utterly redemptive" and that the line 'I believe in possibility' refracted like "sun from a cloud". Michelle Geslani from Consequence of Sound said "the song is a bare-bones ballad that's quietly backed only by the delicate purr of a piano. However, its austerity serves as its greatest strength and allows the Welsh singer to convey joy and exultation on her own terms — intimately, with much contemplation, and through the use of her emotive, porcelain-like vocals."

Although the song was not released as a single, upon release it reached number 1 on iTunes in 9 countries, number 6 in the US, and got to ten in the UK. The song failed to chart in any country; in the UK, the song was ineligible to chart since most of the purchases came as instant gratification downloads for album preorders.

== Track listing ==
- US Digital download
1. "Happy" – 4:03

== Release history ==
Region	Date	Format	Label
Worldwide	12 December 2014	Digital download (via pre-order of the album)	Atlantic Records
