= I'm a Ruin =

Single by Marina and the Diamonds

from the album Froot
- Released: 2 February 2015
- Genre: Synth-pop
- Length: 4:32
- Label: Neon Gold; Atlantic
- Songwriter(s): Marina Diamandis
- Producer(s): Marina Diamandis; David Kosten

Marina and the Diamonds singles chronology
| "Happy" (2015) | "I'm a Ruin" (2015) | "Forget" (2015) |

Music video
- "I'm a Ruin" on YouTube

"I'm a Ruin" is a song by Welsh singer-songwriter Marina Diamandis, professionally known as Marina and the Diamonds. It was released on 2 February 2015 as the third official single from her third studio album, Froot, two months before the release of the album. A music video for the song was released the following day, and premiered on Noisey. During its initial premiere on BBC Radio 1 in the United Kingdom, host Huw Stephens announced that the song would be officially released as a single in the United Kingdom on 22 March 2015. "I'm a Ruin" was praised by critics, who commended its production, lyrical content, and Diamandis' vocal delivery; it was further hailed as a highlight of Froot.

== Background and release ==
As with the other tracks on the album, "I'm a Ruin" was written solely by Diamandis. It was written about an experience in which she had to break up with someone with whom she was in a relationship, which left her with feelings of guilt as she had hurt someone else. Diamandis said of the experience "It's just as hard as being rejected or dumped".

The song is a sparse synth-based pop track that features mild hints of disco. Like the rest of the album, it was recorded with a live band, and produced by David Kosten and Diamandis.

The song was officially released on 2 February, but due to early shipping of the "Immortal"/"I'm a Ruin" vinyl single, containing the song in addition to previous promotional single "Immortal", it leaked online around a week and a half earlier. The song received its first official radio premiere on Huw Stephens’ radio show on 27 January.

== Music video ==
The song received its YouTube premiere on 27 January 2015 as an audio video. On the same day, the hashtag "#imaruin" trended at number one worldwide.

On 3 February, the official music video premiered via Noisey's website. It was directed by Marcus Lundqvist and filmed during late January 2015 on the island of Lanzarote, Spain, and features Diamandis dancing in front of a barren mountainous landscape, which switches later on in the song to an underwater scene where she is surrounded by jellyfish. 17 days later, an acoustic video for "I'm a Ruin" premiered on Elle's website. It was directed by Paul Caslin, who directed all of Diamandis' acoustic videos on Froot.

== Reception ==
The song received critical acclaim from reviewers. Jamie Milton from DIY called it "another affected take from the record, beginning lovelorn and sombre before finding 'Froot'-laced escape in the energy-flowing choruses." Despite giving a mixed review of Froot, Joe Rivers of Clash called "I'm a Ruin" an "absolute songwriting masterclass." Matt Collar from AllMusic called "I'm a Ruin" a "shadowy" and "airy introspective epic," and compared the song to songs by Scottish singer-songwriter Annie Lennox. Collar also chose "I'm a Ruin" as a highlight of Froot. Laurence Day of The Line of Best Fit stated that "I'm a Ruin" is "arguably the centerpiece of the album." He further added that the song contained "all the neon-flicker glamour, the fading elegance, the regret-laced-with-hope tenets and the unfathomably catchy double-tap chorus," which "superglues together all the best bits of FROOT into one delicious package."

== Track listing ==
- Digital download
1. "I'm a Ruin" – 4:32

== Charts ==
Chart performance for "I'm a Ruin"
| Chart (2015) | Peak position |
|---|---|
| UK Singles (OCC) | 169 |

== Release history ==
| Region | Date | Format | Label |
|---|---|---|---|
| Various | 2 February 2015 | Digital download (via pre-order of the album) | Neon Gold; Atlantic |
| United Kingdom | 22 March 2015 | Digital download (single release) | Neon Gold; Atlantic |
