= To All the Boys: P.S. I Still Love You (soundtrack) =

To All the Boys: P.S. I Still Love You (Music from the Netflix Film)

Soundtrack album by various artists
- Released: February 7, 2020
- Length: 50:17
- Label: Capitol
- Producers: Laura Webb; Lindsay Wolfington

Singles from To All the Boys: P.S. I Still Love You (Music from the Netflix Film)
- 1. "About Love" Released: February 7, 2020; 2. "As I'll Ever Be" Released: February 7, 2020

To All the Boys: P.S. I Still Love You (Music from the Netflix Film) is the soundtrack album to the 2020 American film To All the Boys: P.S. I Still Love You. It was released on February 7, 2020 by Capitol Records. The soundtrack's release was simultaneous with the distribution of two singles: "About Love" by Welsh singer Marina and "As I'll Ever Be" by American singer Chaz Cardigan. Ashe's 2019 single "Moral of the Story" was featured on the soundtrack and became a sleeper hit after its inclusion in the film, reaching the top 40 in several countries.

== Singles ==
"About Love" by Welsh singer and songwriter Marina was first mentioned on January 29, 2020, in a press release for the film. It was released as the soundtrack's lead single for digital download and streaming in various countries on February 7, 2020 through Capitol Records. In Belgium, the song reached number 38 on the Ultratop Top 50 chart on February 28, 2020. Four days later, a promotional lyric video was uploaded to Capitol Records' YouTube channel, which was produced and directed by Filipino artist Bianca Nicdao, and animated by Goldmond Fong.

The soundtrack's second single, "As I'll Ever Be" by American singer Chaz Cardigan, was also released on February 7, 2020.

== Track listing ==
To All the Boys: P.S. I Still Love You (Music from the Netflix Film) – Standard edition
No.	Title	Writer(s)	Performer(s)	Length
1.	"I Can't Believe"	Cynthia Nabozny; Matias Mora	Cyn	2:25
2.	"Age of Consent"	Bernard Sumner; Gillian Gilbert; Peter Hook; Stephen Paul David Morris	Cayetana	3:46
3.	"About Love"	Marina Diamandis; Ben Berger; Ryan McMahon; Ryan Rabin	Marina	3:34
4.	"Crashing"	Nicholas Miller; Julia Michaels; Justin Tranter; Antonina Armato; Elio Armato; Tim James	Illenium featuring Bahari	3:51
5.	"Moral of the Story"	Finneas O'Connell; Ashlyn Wilson; Casey Smith; Noah Conrad	Ashe	3:21
6.	"Midnight Sun"	Ryan Chadwick; Timothy Arnott	OTR and Ukiyo	3:55
7.	"Purple Hat"	Sophie Hawley-Weld; Tucker Halpern; Jon Hume; Richard Bynon; Joshua Hoisington	Sofi Tukker	2:58
8.	"Candy"	Bad Child; Ryan Chambers; Casey Marshall	Bad Child featuring Ryan Chambers	2:16
9.	"Way Back In"	Tim Perry	Ages and Ages	3:46
10.	"As I'll Ever Be"	Chaz McKinney; Davis Naish	Chaz Cardigan	2:26
11.	"Honest"	Hanne Eriksen; Karl Zine	Hanne Mjøen	3:35
12.	"You're Mine"	Gil Landau; Yael Shoshana Cohen	Lola Marsh	4:12
13.	"You Should Be Dancing"	Barry Gibb; Maurice Gibb; Robin Gibb	The New Respects	3:14
14.	"Better by Myself"	Rena Lovelis; Nia Lovelis; Casey Moretta; Daniel Nigro; Gabe Simon	Hey Violet	3:14
15.	"Something Like This"	Sophie Payten	Gordi	3:44
Total length:				50:17

To All the Boys: P.S. I Still Love You (Music from the Netflix Film) – Urban Outfitters LP edition
No.	Title	Performer(s)	Length
1.	"I Can't Believe"	CYN	2:25
2.	"Age of Consent"	Cayetana	3:46
3.	"About Love"	Marina	3:34
4.	"Crashing"	Illenium featuring Bahari	3:51
5.	"Moral of the Story"	Ashe	3:21
6.	"Midnight Sun"	OTR and Ukiyo	3:55
7.	"Purple Hat"	Sofi Tukker	2:58
8.	"Candy"	Bad Child featuring Ryan Chambers	2:16
9.	"Way Back In"	Ages and Ages	3:46
10.	"As I'll Ever Be"	Chaz Cardigan	2:26
11.	"You're Mine"	Lola Marsh	4:12
12.	"Honest"	Hanne Mjøen	3:35
13.	"Something Like This"	Gordi	3:44
Total length:			43:49

== Credits and personnel ==
=== Personnel ===
Credits adapted from the film's press release.

- Michael Fimognari – executive producer
- Matt Kaplan – executive producer
- Laura Webb – producer
- Lindsay Wolfington – producer

=== Production ===
Credits adapted from Spotify.

- Daniel Anglister – producer (track 12)
- Allegra Anka – producer (track 2)
- Bad Child – producer (track 8)
- Richard Bynon – producer (track 7)
- Captain Cuts – producer (track 3)
- Noah Conrad – producer (track 5)
- Joseph E-Shine – producer (track 12)
- Illenium – producer (track 4)
- Augusta Koch – producer (track 2)
- Gil Landau – producer (track 12)
- Jeremy Lutito – producer (track 13)
- Casey Marshall – producer (track 8)
- Matias Mora – producer (track 1)
- Davis Naish – producer (track 10)
- Daniel Nigro – producer (track 14)
- Finneas O'Connell – producer (track 5)
- Rob Oberdorfer – producer (track 9)
- Kelly Olsen – producer (track 2)
- OTR – producer (track 6)
- Sophie Payten – producer (track 15)
- Tim Perry – producer (track 9)
- Evan Railton – producer (track 9)
- Rock Mafia – producer (track 4)
- Sofi Tukker – producer (track 7)
- Alex Somers – producer (track 15)
- Shimo Tal – producer (track 12)
- Ukiyo – producer (track 6)
- Ori Winokur – producer (track 12)
- Karl Zine – producer (track 11)

== Release history ==
Release dates and formats for To All the Boys: P.S. I Still Love You (Music from the Netflix Film)
Region	Date	Format(s)	Edition	Label	Ref.
Various	February 7, 2020	Digital download; streaming	Standard	Capitol	
United States	April 17, 2020	CD	Standard	Capitol	
United States	May 22, 2020	LP	Standard	Capitol	
United States	May 22, 2020	LP	Urban Outfitters	Capitol	
