= Froot (song) =

Single by Marina and the Diamonds

from the album Froot
- Released: 10 October 2014
- Recorded: 2013
- Genre: Disco; electropop; pop; dance
- Length: 5:31
- Label: Atlantic
- Songwriter(s): Marina Diamandis
- Producer(s): David Kosten; Marina Diamandis

Marina and the Diamonds singles chronology
| "How to Be a Heartbreaker" (2012) | "Froot" (2014) | "Happy" (2014) |

Music video
- "Froot" on YouTube

"Froot" is a song by Welsh singer Marina Diamandis, released under the stage name Marina and the Diamonds. It was released for streaming on 10 October 2014, to coincide with the singer's birthday, and later received a full digital release as the lead single of her third studio album of the same name. Diamandis premiered the single on YouTube.

== Background and release ==
In March 2014, she posted the song line "I've been saving all my summers for you." She uploaded a snippet of her then-unreleased track "Froot" through her Instagram account in September 2014, and released its lyric through the same profile the following month. On 10 October, to coincide with Diamandis' 29th birthday, the song itself was premiered as the lead single from the newly-titled parent album Froot (2015).

== Composition ==
"Froot" is an upbeat, '80s-inspired disco, electropop, pop and dance song composed in the key of G minor with a tempo of 120 beats per minute and Diamandis' vocals spanning notes between F_{3} and D_{5}.

== Music video ==
Diamandis released an audio video for "Froot" through her channel on YouTube on 10 October 2014. The video, which reached one million views in a few days, features animated depictions of fruit and celestial bodies slowly rotating through a celestial background with the title of the track appearing occasionally in multicolor. The video was animated by artist Bill Richards, with the same animations used for an audio video for second promotional single "Happy". On 4 November 2014, Diamandis hinted via Twitter that she would release the music video a week later. She also tweeted a behind the scenes promo image.

A music video for "Froot" was filmed in Eltham Palace at the end of October 2014, with Chino Moya as the director; it was released through Diamandis' YouTube channel on 11 November 2014, featuring a shortened radio edit of the song.

== Critical reception ==
The song received positive reviews from most reviewers. Hayden Manders from Refinery29 commented that the track combined the "tongue-in-cheek wordplay" from Diamandis' debut studio album The Family Jewels (2010) and the "decidedly danceable production" from her follow-up project Electra Heart (2012) in a fashion that would help her "break free of cult status". Lucas Villa of AXS also wrote that the song was a return to the "quirkier pop" of her debut album. He further described it as an "'80s video game-inspired electro-pop track" that was a "fruitful return" for Diamandis. David Deady of MusicScene.ie stated that Marina "never fails to paint a perfect picture for her audience" and this track will leave fans "salivating for more." Ryan Reed of Billboard, however, gave "Froot" only 2.5 out of 5 stars. He called the song a "pop banger", and praised its production for sounding "sonically fresh"; however, he panned the lyrics, calling them "stale."

== Charts ==
Chart performance for "Froot"
| Chart (2015) | Peak position |
|---|---|
| UK Physical Singles (OCC) | 19 |
