= Froot =

2015 studio album by Marina and the Diamonds

Studio album by Marina and the Diamonds
- Released: 13 March 2015
- Studios: Muttley Ranch (London); Kore (London); Assault & Battery 2 (London)
- Genres: Pop; Europop; synth-pop
- Length: 53:05
- Labels: Atlantic; Neon Gold
- Producers: David Kosten; Marina Diamandis

Marina and the Diamonds chronology
Electra Heart (2012)	Froot (2015)	Froot Acoustic EP (2015)

Singles from Froot
- 1. "Froot" Released: 11 November 2014; 2. "Happy" Released: 12 December 2014; 3. "I'm a Ruin" Released: 2 February 2015; 4. "Forget" Released: 3 March 2015; 5. "Blue" Released: 16 July 2015

Froot is the third studio album by the Welsh singer and songwriter Marina Diamandis, and her last under the stage name Marina and the Diamonds. It was originally scheduled to be released on 3 April 2015, through Atlantic and Neon Gold Records, although it was ultimately released on 13 March 2015, due to unauthorised Internet leaks. With the record being written entirely by Diamandis, she collaborated with David Kosten for production.

After drafting new material for the album while spending a month in the United States, Diamandis felt an improvement as a songwriter and believing in her own abilities. Musically, she conceived Froot as a pop record, influenced by Europop and synth-pop, with elements of electronic music, indie pop, new wave, and rock. Upon its release, music critics commended its cohesive production and further applauded Diamandis for her vocal delivery. A critical success, it appeared on several critics' year-end lists in 2015. The record debuted at number 10 in the United Kingdom (Official Albums Chart) with first-week sales of 10,411 copies. It also became her first top 10 album in the United States, debuting at number eight on the Billboard 200 chart after selling 46,000 units.

The "Froot of the Month" campaign saw six songs ("Froot", "Happy", "Immortal", "I'm a Ruin", "Forget" and "Gold") released on a monthly basis in anticipation of the record. Froot has been promoted through a series of festival performances during the spring and summer; Diamandis toured internationally with the accompanying Neon Nature Tour, with performances scheduled in North America, Europe and South America between October 2015 and March 2016.

== Development and production ==
"Maybe I was ready to change [and] leave a lot of things I'd held onto in the past behind. I don't know if that happens to other people when they hit a certain age, or maybe some people don't even have those issues to begin with. Perhaps it's not very common, but I know that it was important for my future."

— Diamandis, starting to take on a new perspective for Froot to The Line of Best Fit

After releasing her second studio album, Electra Heart (2012), which became her first chart-topping album in the United Kingdom, the Welsh singer and songwriter Marina Diamandis had spent one month in New York City, United States. During that time, she attended a relaunch party for Billboard on 22 February 2013, revealing that she had begun writing songs for her forthcoming album. She later confirmed in a Facebook question and answer (Q&A) session with her fans on 13 October 2014, that material for the record was written from July 2012 onwards.

Speaking with The Line of Best Fit, Diamandis already knew what she wanted to do with the third record after finishing her "incredible" past record along with "Primadonna" (2012). Electra Heart came with a list of production and writing credits, which included American record producers Diplo and Dr. Luke, but for the new record she preferred the company of one producer as opposed to a rotating cast; on Froot, Diamandis could produce the project. After seeing the creative process occurring, Diamandis felt that her confidence as a songwriter had improved by listening to her instincts and believing in her own abilities. Further, she felt that there was a distance between the way she sounded in a recorded and live performance, so when she started writing the album and was looking for a producer, she explained to her artists and repertoire (A&R) that she needed to be produced as a band.

Diamandis also stated that Froot was not entirely dark and that "it's almost celebrating being happy". She described the album as considerably "reflective" in comparison to her previous releases, and is said to be "centred around extremely different things; half of the album is about a relationship that I had to end". The singer declared the word "Fruit" was spelled as "Froot" because she liked the way it looked, especially since the "O"s could interlink.

== Themes and composition ==
Froot is defined as a pop, Europop and synth-pop album with broader elements of electronic music, indie pop, new wave, and rock. The songs were recorded with a live band. "Happy", the album opener is a heartfelt pop ballad, where the singer is presenting her sentiments "above the simplest, sweetest of piano melodies", with her voice remaining the focus. The title track was described by critics as a collage of forgotten 1970s and 1980s club gems. "I'm a Ruin" is a mid-tempo composition in which Diamandis reflects on life and loving herself selfishly. The tense vocals are backed by lush, throwback synths and hard-hitting drums. Bradley Stern of MuuMuse complimented the lyrics as similar to the ones she wrote for Electra Heart (2012), while also "starkly confessional".

The Line of Best Fit's Larry Day described "Better Than That" as "sassy" and "a future heavy-hitter, doused in wah-wah axes and classic funk and rock delvings", while Diamandis herself said it was "like classic rock". "Savages", the penultimate track, reflects on humanity's proneness to violence, and is inspired by contemporary events including the Boston Marathon bombing and the Delhi gang rape; Diamandis called it one of the "most important" songs on Froot and expressed a wish for it to be released on its own, despite saying that it "doesn't scream radio single". The closing track, "Immortal", was written while visiting a war memorial in Poland and was described as "brandishing emotional and thematic gravitas" by The Line of Best Fit where it seeks "everlasting life and remembrance" following through the philosophy of Søren Kierkegaard.

== Promotion and release ==
=== Marketing and singles ===
Diamandis first teased the album's title track, "Froot", on 1 September 2014, through social media platform Instagram. The song soon premiered on Diamandis's 29th birthday, 10 October, being released digitally on 11 November. The track listing was confirmed on 9 November, while the album cover was later unveiled the following day. Diamandis also had planned in releasing a boxed-set, containing six varicoloured 7-inch vinyl singles, six scratch and sniff stickers. She then confirmed to share six songs before the album release, one each month up until 6 April 2015, calling this proposal as the "Froot of the Month". Afterwards, Diamandis released the second single titled "Happy" on 12 December 2014, issued along with the previous song as the first purple 7-inch vinyl from the campaign.

The next year, another song titled "Immortal" was shared 2 January 2015, with "I'm a Ruin" released as the third single for Froot on 2 February 2015; both songs were also released through a yellow 7-inch vinyl. The same goes towards the fourth single "Forget" on 3 March with "Gold" as it concluded the "Froot of the Month" strategy; an orange 7-inch vinyl was made. Afterwards, the remaining tracks on the album were also released as 7-inch vinyl singles. "Blue" became the fifth and final single for Froot on 16 July 2015, separate from the campaign.

After questioning about her promotional stance, Diamandis tweeted, "I came up with the 'Froot of the Month' strategy to enable me to release the music I wanted to, as opposed to what might work commercially." After the unauthorised Internet leaks and subsequent early release of the album, fans speculated that this would be cut short to five songs, but despite this, the final song was released on its planned date. Interviewed by Billboard in April 2015, Diamandis expressed a wish to repackage the album with new tracks to include "I'm Not Hungry Anymore". However, she later decided against it, stating that Froot works best as a 12-track album and that she was still not satisfied with the new track. However, a demo version of the song was leaked in late 2017, but on 28 July 2019, Diamandis announced that she would perform an acoustic version of "I'm Not Hungry Anymore" for the first time live during her Love + Fear Tour. She would ultimately release the song in 2025, via different streaming services and on digital download for its tenth anniversary of the album.

=== Concert tour and festivals ===
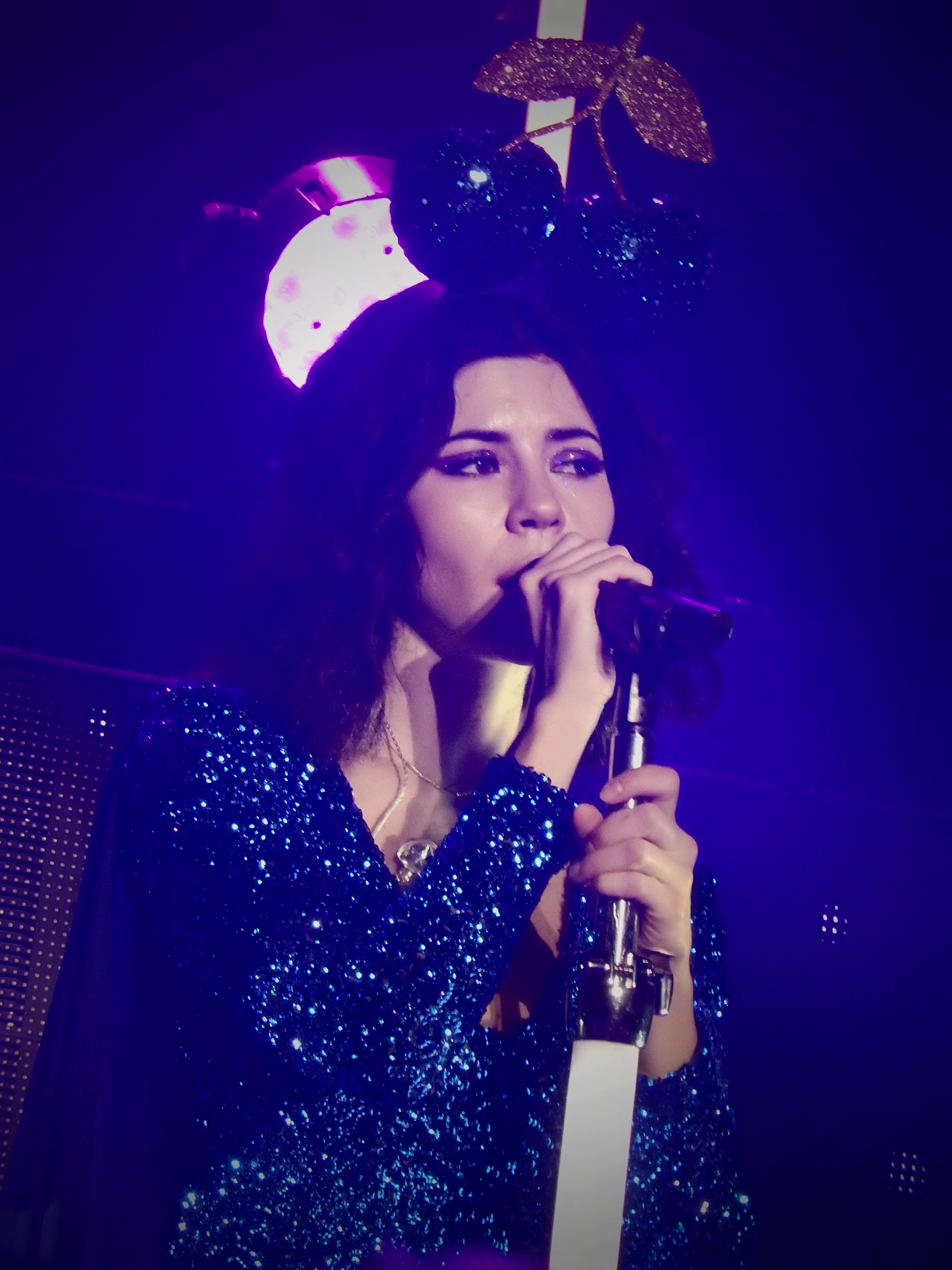
Diamandis performing during her Neon Nature Tour at London, in February 2016

Diamandis gave several large profile performances during early 2015, such as a performance at the Coachella Valley Music and Arts Festival between 12 and 19 April. After her performance at the Governor's Ball in June, Diamandis announced the first dates of her third headlining Neon Nature Tour on 23 June which also included the Lollapalooza Festival in August. Speaking with The Guardian, she stated that her hopes for the merchandise stand for the concert tour, such as glow-in-the-dark T-shirts, eye shadow, and nail varnish modeled after Diamandis's colour palette, so that audience members can wear them and be a part of the show. The stage decoration for the festival performances was described by Diamandis as an "electric garden, with luminous flowers and shiny fruit", though the debut of said setup during Lollapalooza Brasil wound up cancelled due to flight delays. The 48-date tour began in October 2015, and included performances in North and South America and Europe.

Diamandis concluded her tour on 5 April 2016 and made a statement on X (formerly Twitter), which she announced the end of the Froot era via a live-chat and personal letter directed toward her fans. Diamandis stated, "I've achieved so many things that I've been trying to for many years. Now, I'm gonna take a little break to do some different things. I've been on the road for seven years, and I've had an amazing, amazing experience. This isn't goodbye for good, it's just for a short while."

== Critical reception ==
Professional ratings
Aggregate scores
Source	Rating
AnyDecentMusic?	7.1/10
Metacritic	75/100
Review scores
Source	Rating
AllMusic	3.5/5 stars
Digital Spy	3/5 stars
DIY	4/5 stars
Entertainment Weekly	A−
The Guardian	3/5 stars
The Irish Times	4/5 stars
The Observer	4/5 stars
Pitchfork	7.5/10
Spin	8/10
Sputnikmusic	4.9/5

Froot received positive reception from contemporary music critics upon its release. According to review aggregator Metacritic, which assigns a normalised rating from mainstream publications, the album received a weighted average score of 75 out of 100, based on nineteen critic reviews.

Multiple reviewers noticed a promising shift in music for Diamandis, where she focused the deep introspection present throughout Froot which read out as a "cohesive pop album" by Michael Cragg for The Observer, rather than being dependent on its singles. In a similar remark, Laurence Day of The Line of Best Fit saw the "anthology of [an] astute nihilistic, [with] existentialist discussions", calling it "one of the most complex pop albums of recent years." This made the album feel more "intriguing" and "untamed by genre" which marked an accomplishment for Diamandis. The Irish Times applaud the diversity of the record's arrangements, while noticing the variety "from polite club bangers [...] to stripped-back ballads [...] to glorious pop", connecting its creativeness by Diamandis and seeing the originality as "singular and ridiculously poptastic." AllMusic editor Matt Collar also saw a defined bridge between Froot with its "uniquely tantalizing, and pugnaciously feminist" tracks while maintaining the "enthusiastic pop hooks and dance beats" of her previous album, Electra Heart. Rory Cashin of State.ie interpreted the album as "far more focused" than its predecessor, characterising Diamandis as "that emotionally intelligent outsider who knew how to perfectly articulate those weird thoughts and reactions," which made him understand more about the singer. Isabella Biedeharn for Entertainment Weekly noted her voice ranging from a "voluptuous alto" or switching to a "fluttering soprano in one swoop." Martin Townsend from the Sunday Express, saw Diamandis as a "pop enigma" showcasing her "euphoric" rhythm and blues sounds in Froot, having a similar likeness to 1986 studio album True Blue, by the American singer Madonna.

Fewer moderate criticism was pointed out, due to the lack of identity in the album, with Lisa Wright for Digital Spy seeing the track listing had a "playful spark", but is having difficulty to understand Marina's "influence [fitting] in pop's spectrum." Caroline Sullivan for The Guardian has also seen "highs and lows" of intensity for Froot which has "a range of styles that don't always join up well", but ultimately called Diamandis and her world as an "intriguing place". Marc Hirsh from The Boston Globe saw Diamandis often switching her tone on the album, whether "silly on the macro scale" or "revealing herself a more canny artist", but noticed some tracks "fall flat" and "mistake quirk for personality", but eventually felt that "a few slices of Froot are exactly ripe enough".

Froot was identified as being the ninth most discussed album of 2015 amongst its users through Metacritic. "I'm a Ruin" was nominated for the 2015 Popjustice £20 Music Prize.

== Commercial performance ==
Froot debuted at number 10 on the UK Albums Chart, selling 10,411 copies in its first week. It sold 2,294 copies in its second week, falling to number 44. In the United States, the album entered the Billboard 200 at number eight with first-week sales of 46,000 units, 43,000 of which consisted of traditional album sales; it became Diamandis's first top-10 album on the chart. As of August 2015, Froot had sold 75,000 copies in the United States. The album debuted at number six on the Canadian Albums Chart with 4,500 copies sold in its first week.

Froot was moderately successful across Europe, reaching number four in Ireland, number 10 in Switzerland, number 19 in Finland, and number 24 in Germany. In Oceania, it peaked at number 12 in both Australia and New Zealand, becoming Diamandis's highest-charting album in both countries.

== Track listing ==
All tracks are written by Marina Diamandis, and co-produced with David Kosten.

Standard edition
No.	Title	Length
1.	"Happy"	4:03
2.	"Froot"	5:31
3.	"I'm a Ruin"	4:32
4.	"Blue"	4:14
5.	"Forget"	4:09
6.	"Gold"	4:14
7.	"Can't Pin Me Down"	3:25
8.	"Solitaire"	4:37
9.	"Better Than That"	4:36
10.	"Weeds"	4:07
11.	"Savages"	4:16
12.	"Immortal"	5:21
Total length:		53:05

10th anniversary edition
No.	Title	Length
13.	"I'm Not Hungry Anymore"	4:05
Total length:		57:10

== Personnel ==
Credits were adapted from the liner notes of the album.

=== Studios ===
- Muttley Ranch; London, United Kingdom
- Kore Studios; London, United Kingdom – drums
- Assault & Battery 2; London, United Kingdom – drums

=== Musicians ===
- Marina Diamandis – keyboards, lead vocals, backing vocals
- David Kosten – keyboards, percussion, programming
- Jason Cooper – drums (tracks 1–5, 7–12)
- Jeremy Pritchard – bass (tracks 1, 3, 4, 9)
- James Ahwai – bass (tracks 2, 5, 7, 8, 10, 12)
- Chris McGrath – bass (track 11)
- Fyfe Dangerfield – piano (track 1); guitar (track 9)
- Keith Bayley – guitar (tracks 5, 10, 12)
- Alexander Robertshaw – guitar (tracks 1–9, 11)
- Wez Clarke – additional programming

=== Technical ===
- David Kosten – production, engineering (all tracks); mixing (track 1)
- Marina Diamandis – production
- Mo Hausler – additional engineering
- Al Lawson – drum recording engineering assistance
- Drew Smith – drum recording engineering assistance
- Wez Clarke – mixing
- Lewis Hopkin – mastering

=== Artwork ===
- Charlotte Rutherford – photography
- Sam Coldy – artwork

== Charts ==
Chart performances
Chart (2015–2025)	Peak position
Australian Albums (ARIA)	12
Austrian Albums (Ö3 Austria)	38
Belgian Albums (Ultratop Flanders)	92
Belgian Albums (Ultratop Wallonia)	61
Canadian Albums (Billboard)	6
Dutch Albums (Album Top 100)	21
Finnish Albums (Suomen virallinen lista)	19
French Albums (SNEP)	78
German Albums (Offizielle Top 100)	24
Hungarian Albums (MAHASZ)	37
Irish Albums (IRMA)	4
Italian Albums (FIMI)	68
New Zealand Albums (RMNZ)	12
Norwegian Albums (VG-lista)	31
Scottish Albums (Official Charts)	9
Spanish Albums (Promusicae)	27
Swedish Albums (Sverigetopplistan)	48
Swiss Albums (Schweizer Hitparade)	10
UK Albums (Official Charts)	10
US Billboard 200	8

== Certifications ==
Certifications
Region	Certification	Certified units/sales
United Kingdom (BPI)	Silver	60,000^{‡}
^{‡} Sales+streaming figures based on certification alone.

== Release history ==
List of release dates, editions, and formats
Region	Date	Format(s)	Edition	Label(s)	Ref.
Various	13 March 2015	CD; digital download; LP; streaming	Standard	Atlantic; Neon Gold	
United States	11 September 2015	Cassette	Standard	Neon Gold; Elektra	
Various	25 July 2025	CD; LP	10th anniversary	Atlantic	

== Froot Acoustic EP ==
Froot Acoustic EP

EP by Marina and the Diamonds
- Released: 8 June 2015
- Genre: Acoustic
- Length: 13:31
- Label: Self-released

Marina and the Diamonds chronology
Froot (2015)	Froot Acoustic EP (2015)	Love + Fear (2019)

Froot Acoustic EP is the second extended play (EP) by Welsh singer and songwriter Marina Diamandis, released under the stage name Marina and the Diamonds. It was self-released digitally on 8 June 2015, through her Myspace page, containing three acoustic versions of songs that originally appeared on the eponymous album. The music videos of these versions were released between December 2014 and March 2015.

=== Track listing ===
All tracks are written by Marina Diamandis.

No.	Title	Length
1.	"Froot"	4:15
2.	"Happy"	4:32
3.	"I'm a Ruin"	4:45
Total length:		13:31
