= WRBB =

Radio station at Northeastern University

Boston, Massachusetts; United States
- Frequency: 104.9 MHz
- Branding: WRBB 104.9 FM

Programming
- Format: College radio

Ownership
- Owner: Northeastern University

History
- Founded: December 13, 1962; 62 years ago (carrier current)
- Former call signs: WNEU (carrier current)
- Call sign meaning: "Radio Back Bay"

Technical information
- Licensing authority: FCC
- Facility ID: 49425
- Class: D
- ERP: 19 watts
- HAAT: 27 meters (89 ft)
- Transmitter coordinates: 42°20′19.3″N 71°5′26.1″W

Links
- Public license information: Public file; LMS
- Webcast: Listen Live
- Website: wrbbradio.org

WRBB (104.9 FM) is a radio station broadcasting a variety format, run by the students of Northeastern University. Licensed to Boston, Massachusetts, United States, it serves the Greater Boston area. The station is owned by Northeastern and transmits from its main Boston campus. The station is funded through the Northeastern Student Activities fee.

The station airs over 100 music and talk programs during a typical semester, encompassing a large variety of musical and topical genres. In addition, all major Northeastern hockey, basketball, and baseball games are also broadcast live. Despite its signal coverage within Boston, its 104.9 frequency collides with nearby WNKC, which covers the North Shore area.

== History ==
The station went on the air on December 13, 1962, as carrier current outlet WNEU, broadcasting only to two dorm buildings on campus. In September 1970, the station began FM broadcasting as WRBB on 91.7 MHz. In 1982, the frequency changed to the current 104.9, due to interference from other stations and FCC rulings.

The station was one of the first college radio stations in the country to broadcast hip-hop music during the early 1980s.

== Notable alumni ==
- Wendy Williams – television personality, host of The Wendy Williams Show
- Alex Faust - hockey and baseball radio and television broadcaster

== See also ==
- Campus radio
- List of college radio stations in the United States
