= Baby (Clean Bandit song) =

2018 song by Clean Bandit

Single by Clean Bandit featuring Marina and Luis Fonsi

from the album What Is Love?
- Language: English; Spanish
- Released: 2 November 2018
- Studio: Westlake Studios (Los Angeles); Club Ralph; Metropolis Studios; RAK Studios (London)
- Length: 3:25
- Label: Atlantic
- Songwriters: Marina Diamandis; Matthew Knott; Luis Lopez-Cepero; Jack Patterson; Camille Purcell
- Producers: Patterson; Grace Chatto; Mark Ralph

Clean Bandit singles chronology
"Solo" (2018)	"Baby" (2018)	"Mama" (2019)

Marina singles chronology
"Disconnect" (2017)	"Baby" (2018)	"Handmade Heaven" (2019)

Luis Fonsi singles chronology
"Imposible" (2018)	"Baby" (2018)	"Sola" (2019)

Music video
- "Baby" on YouTube

"Baby" is a song by the English electronic music group Clean Bandit, featuring guest vocals from Welsh singer Marina and Puerto Rican singer Luis Fonsi. It was released on 2 November 2018 through Atlantic Records, as the fifth single from Clean Bandit's second studio album, What Is Love? (2018). The song was written by Diamandis, Matthew Knott, Fonsi, Jack Patterson, and Camille Purcell.

An accompanying music video was released the same day, where an unnamed bride (portrayed by Grace Chatto) marrying the groom (Fonsi), revealing flashbacks of having a thwarted relationship with a wedding guest (Starley), while attending summer camp. Clean Bandit later performed "Baby" on television programme Strictly Come Dancing: It Takes Two. It marked as Marina's first single where she is not credited under her previous stage name and later appeared on her fourth studio album, Love + Fear (2019); a version without Fonsi appears on the album's vinyl release.

Commercially, the song topped the charts in Israel (Media Forest), and debuted at number fifteen in the United Kingdom (Official Singles Chart), while it reached the top twenty in Bulgaria, Croatia, Iceland, Lebanon, and Scotland. "Baby" was later certified gold both in Poland and the United Kingdom.

== Background and release ==
During the annual Coachella Valley Music and Arts Festival in 2015, the English electronic music group Clean Bandit brought out Welsh singer Marina Diamandis (who was previously known Marina as and the Diamonds) onto the main stage and performed an unreleased track, that was then titled as "Disconnect". They next year, Diamandis tweeted the band to inquire about the song's official release date in 2016, which later bandmate Grace Chatto explained in an interview with BBC News that the song "had been through several permutations before they got it right". It was later surprise-released on 23 June 2017, coinciding with their scheduled performance at the Glastonbury Festival of Contemporary Performing Arts.

After releasing "Solo" featuring American singer Demi Lovato, Clean Bandit subsequently announced their second studio album, What Is Love?, on 27 September 2018 along with its track listing. It showed a second collaboration with Diamandis, titled "Baby" with Puerto Rican singer Luis Fonsi.

On 29 October 2018, the group announced the release on Twitter and shared its cover art. On 2 November 2018, the group performed on BBC Two's Strictly Come Dancing: It Takes Two.

== Composition and reception ==
Baby is composed in the key of C minor. Lyrically, the song deals with a love triangle, with the singer telling somebody that they are "already someone else's".

The song has a tempo of 117 beats per minute, and has a time signature of common time. It also features a complete descending circle of fifths, which propels the music forward throughout the circle of fifths and back to C minor.

Mike Wass of Idolator called the preview of the song a "sultry banger that already sounds like a hit", saying Marina "coos" the line "But I'm already someone else's baby" over Clean Bandit's "seductive, Latin-tinged house beats". Billboard labelled "Baby" a "flamenco-infused track", opining that Fonsi's verse in Spanish provides it with a "distinctive Latin flare".

== Music video ==
Clean Bandit also released the video on YouTube on 2 November 2018. The video features Fonsi, Marina, Grace Chatto, and Australian singer Starley. Chatto portrays an unnamed bride who marries Fonsi's character as it is revealed via flashbacks that she had a thwarted relationship with Starley’s character—now a wedding guest—while attending summer camp. The wedding scene was shot at the Wayfarers Chapel in Rancho Palos Verdes, California.

== Track listing ==
- Digital download/streaming
1. "Baby" – 3:25
- Digital download/streaming – acoustic
1. "Baby" (acoustic) – 3:37
- Digital download/streaming – remixes
1. "Baby" (Martin Jensen remix) – 3:02
2. "Baby" (Sammy Porter remix) – 3:28

== Credits and personnel ==
Credits were adapted from the liner notes of Love + Fear.

- Clean Bandit – lead artist
- Marina – featured vocals
- Luis Fonsi – featured vocals
- Jack Patterson – engineering, guitar, keyboards, mixing
- Luke Patterson – piano, percussion, additional drums, trumpet
- Mark Ralph – guitar, mixing
- Nakajin – acoustic guitar
- Grace Chatto – bass
- Alex Robinson – engineering
- Mike Horner – engineering
- Ray Charles Brown Jr. – engineering
- Ross Fortune – engineering
- Tom AD Fuller – engineering
- Greg Eliason – assistant engineering

== Charts ==
=== Weekly charts ===
Chart (2018–2019)	Peak position
Belarus Airplay (Eurofest)	18
Belgium (Ultratip Bubbling Under Flanders)	5
Belgium Dance (Ultratop Flanders)	32
Belgium (Ultratip Bubbling Under Wallonia)	17
Belgium Dance (Ultratop Wallonia)	11
Bulgaria (PROPHON)	2
CIS Airplay (TopHit)	4
Croatia (HRT)	11
Czech Republic Airplay (ČNS IFPI)	38
Greece (IFPI)	51
Hungary (Dance Top 40)	10
Hungary (Single Top 40)	29
Iceland (Tónlistinn)	5
Ireland (IRMA)	39
Israel (Media Forest)	1
Lebanon (Lebanese Top 20)	16
Lithuania (AGATA)	69
Mexico Airplay (Billboard)	5
Netherlands (Dutch Top 40)	21
New Zealand Hot Singles (RMNZ)	20
Romania (Airplay 100)	30
Russia Airplay (TopHit)	4
Scottish Singles Sales (Official Charts)	6
Slovakia Airplay (ČNS IFPI)	9
Slovakia Singles Digital (ČNS IFPI)	100
Slovenia (SloTop50)	23
UK Singles (Official Charts)	15
US Hot Dance/Electronic Songs (Billboard)	13

=== Year-end charts ===
Chart (2019)	Position
CIS (Tophit)	121
Hungary (Dance Top 40)	47
Russia Airplay (Tophit)	127
Slovenia (SloTop50)	34
US Hot Dance/Electronic Songs (Billboard)	53

== Certifications ==
List of certifications with units and/or sales
Region	Certification	Certified units/sales
Poland (ZPAV)	Gold	25,000^{‡}
United Kingdom (BPI)	Gold	400,000^{‡}
^{‡} Sales+streaming figures based on certification alone.

== Release history ==
List of release dates and formats
Region	Date	Format	Version	Label	Ref.
Various	2 November 2018	Digital download; streaming	Original	Atlantic	
Italy	9 November 2018	Contemporary hit radio	Original	Warner	
United Kingdom	16 November 2018	Contemporary hit radio	Original	Warner	
Various	16 November 2018	Digital download; streaming	Acoustic	Atlantic	
Various	23 November 2018	Digital download; streaming	Remixes	Atlantic	
Various	30 November 2018	Digital download; streaming	Remixes	Atlantic	
