= Neon Nature Tour =

2015–16 concert tour by Marina

- Tour by Marina
- Associated album: Froot
- Start date: 12 October 2015
- End date: 20 March 2016
- Legs: 3
- No. of shows: 52
- Supporting acts: Shamir; Christine and the Queens; Clock Opera; Rivrs; Kloe; Shura; Aprile; Lghtnng; PollyAnna; Lys; Light & Love; Mary PopKids; Ilia Darlin

Marina concert chronology
- The Lonely Hearts Club Tour (2012–13); Neon Nature Tour (2015–16); Love + Fear Tour (2019)

The Neon Nature Tour is the third concert tour by Welsh singer Marina (formerly known as Marina and the Diamonds) in support of her third studio album, Froot (2015). The tour was officially announced three months after the release of the album, on 23 June 2015. The tour began on 12 October 2015, in Houston, Texas at the Revention Music Center and concluded on March 20, 2016, in Santiago, Chile, with a total of fifty-two shows over six months.

== Background ==
After the release of Froot, Diamandis embarked on a promotional concert tour that was mostly composed of festival performances during the spring and summer of 2015. During the series of promotional concerts, Diamandis expressed an interest in doing a formal concert tour in the fall of that year. In April 2015, when speaking about the tour, Diamandis said "I think I’m calling my tour the Neon Nature tour. Creating this cyber garden on-stage, something exotic, but electrical."

Two months after the initial idea was expressed, on 23 June 2015, the tour's North American leg was officially announced with nineteen dates over two months. About two weeks after the tour's initial announcement, on 6 July 2015, the tour's European leg was announced with ten dates across the United Kingdom and Ireland. As the tour began to develop, additional dates were added to both legs of the tour.

On 5 April 2016, Diamandis posted a picture to Instagram following the conclusion of her tour, along with a statement on Twitter, marking the end of the Froot era, with Weeds being the only track on the album never performed live in the entirety of the Froot era and her career.

== Development ==
In the months leading up to the tour, Diamandis began to tease what the tour's visual concept and theme would be. In an interview, Diamandis stated, "With the Neon Nature Tour, I really like the idea of taking natural things and blending them. I feel like it's something I’m always interested in anyway, and I feel like it's also something a lot of people connect to, like, 'How can you live a life that's natural while still progressing and being part of the technological world.' So the themes for Neon Nature involve a lot of flowers, fruit, very surreal elements … but it's definitely the biggest kind of tour I’ve ever done production-wise. I want to see what people think." She also revealed how the setlist would be structured as well as what type of merchandise will be for sale on the tour. When speaking of the setlist for the tour, Diamandis stated, "I have three acts in the show. My first act is devoted to my first album (The Family Jewels), the second is my second album, and the third is Froot. It's something I’ve wanted to do for a while. Each era has such a defined look that it didn’t make sense for me to mix them. I quite like theatre, and this is a theatrical show. It felt good to put it into three acts. I don’t think that often happens in alternative shows." When discussing what the merchandise stand would consist of, Diamandis exclaimed, "Well, I plan to go one up from what I’ve done in the past. I really want to do scratch and sniff T-shirts. Maybe those Global Hypercolor ones. I want to put my colour palette onto eye shadows and nail varnish. I also want glow in the dark T-shirts that people can buy and then be part of the show."

== Concert synopsis ==
The show is split into three acts, each one devoted to an album by Diamandis, beginning with "The Family Jewels". During most, but not all, shows, the show is performed on a double stage, comprising the venue's original stage floor and a balcony-style stage above three video screens.

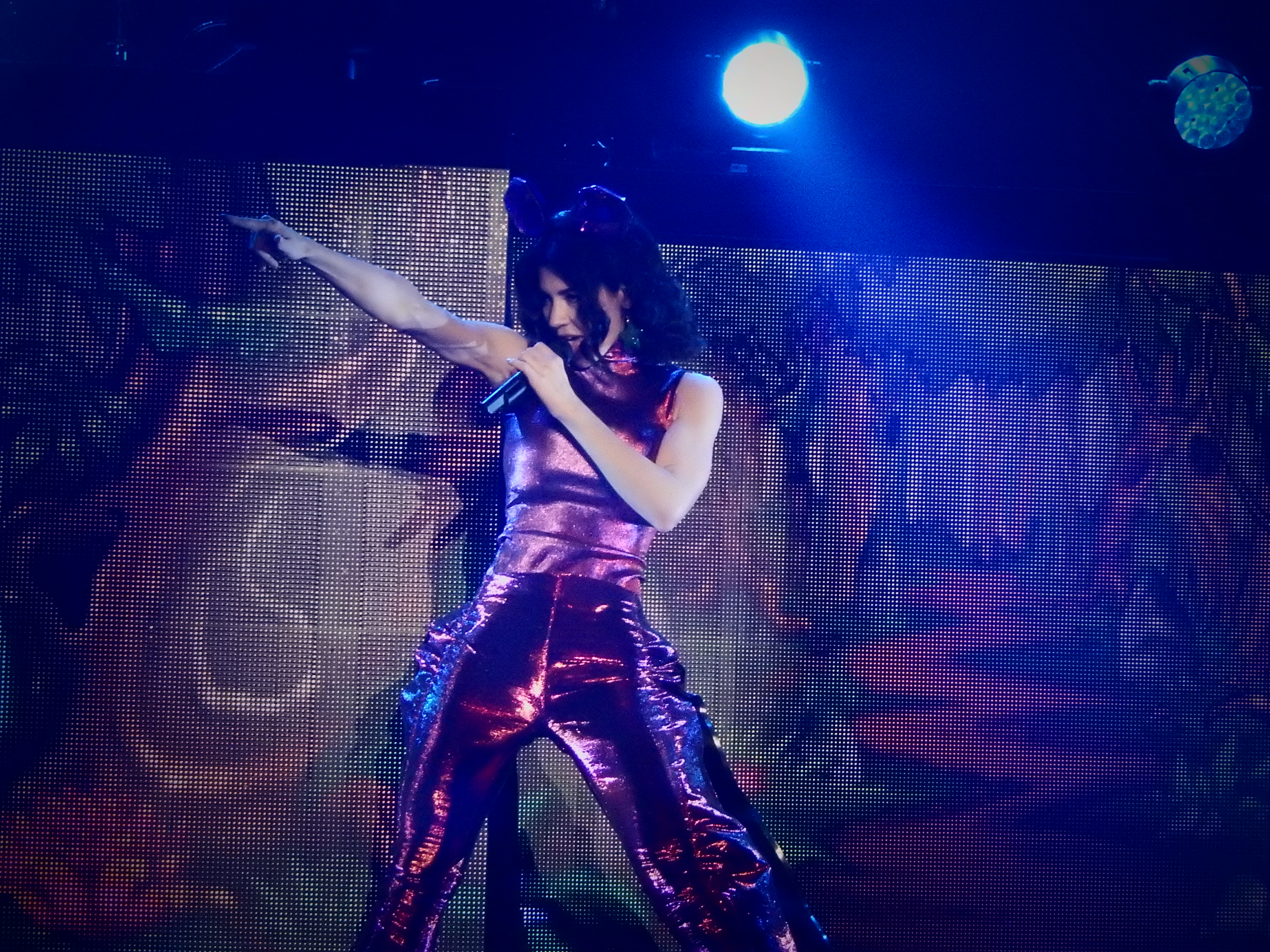
Diamandis wearing one of the two outfits designed by Paula Knorr for "The Family Jewels" section.

The show's opener, "Mowgli's Road" is performed. While during most of the United Kingdom and North American leg of the tour, Diamandis enters wearing either one of two outfits designed by Paula Knorr, featuring headbands with two jewels on them. During the European and South American leg of the tour, some of the shows started with Diamandis entering and performing "Mowgli's Road" in an outfit designed by Celia Kritharioti. The show continues with "I Am Not a Robot" and "Oh No!"; Diamandis briefly talks to the audience and moves to a keyboard to perform "Obsessions" while the video screens display footage from Betty Boop shorts. This section closes with a performance of "Hollywood" amid scenes of animated Hollywood. Diamandis leaves the stage for a costume change.

Opening the next section, a remixed version of "Electra Heart" is played by the band alongside a video interlude where Diamandis' face is seen flowing to her signature Electra Heart look while the album's title flashes. While an interlude of "Bubblegum Bitch" is played, a silhouette of Diamandis appears on the screens, and Diamandis enters with pompoms and the signature heart on her left cheek. At most of the concerts, Diamandis enters wearing a pink catsuit designed by Austin Louis Perry, while some of the other concerts she is seen wearing an outfit also designed by Austin Louis Perry with a pink catsuit and holographic bell bottoms on her arms and legs. She begins to perform an energetic performance of "Bubblegum Bitch" with the video screens displaying various phrases such as "Tweet Me", "Marry Me", "Cwtch Me" ("cwtch" is Welsh for "cuddle" or "hug"), "Miracles Happen". After the first chorus, she throws the pompoms back in a sassy manner. The next number played was "Teen Idle". In 2016, the graphics changed with phrases that say "Welcome to the life of Electra Heart" and "Marilyn is the only one who understands" (Earlier in the tour, "Radioactive" was performed instead of "Teen Idle"). This is followed by "How to Be a Heartbreaker". "Primadonna" is performed after Diamandis re-introduces the robotic poodle "Marilyn", who also made an appearance in the majority of "The Lonely Hearts Club Tour". The section closes with a performance of "Lies" where lights start flashing around the stage, and Diamandis exits for another costume change.

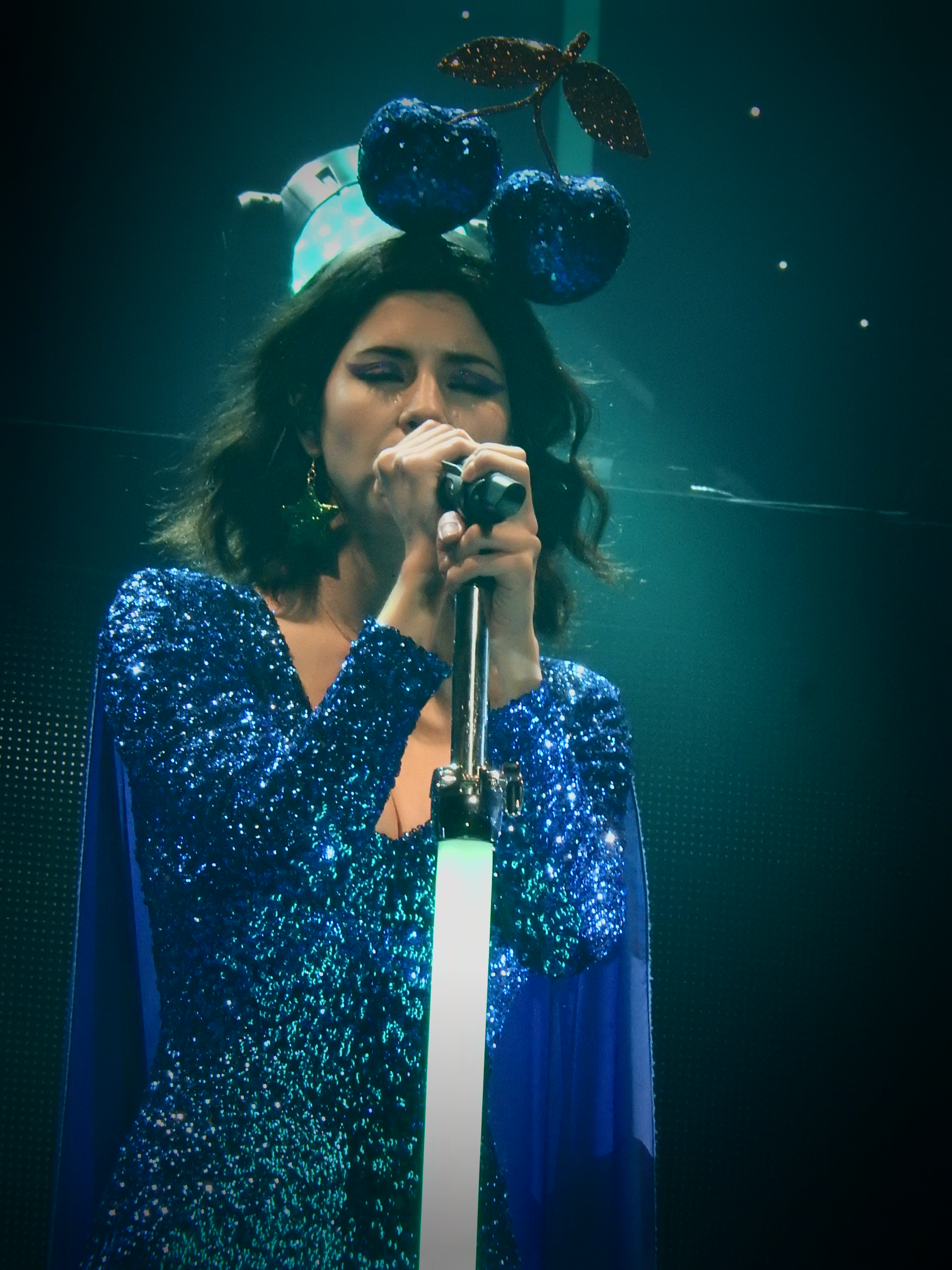
Outfit designed by Michael Costello for the "Froot" section.

The next section opens with a video interlude displaying Diamandis' Electra Heart look transforming to her face as seen in the cover of "Froot", with a starry background and various fruits as well as the album's name flashing on the screen. Diamandis re-appears above the video screens. and at most concerts, wearing a sparkly blue catsuit with similar colored cape attached and similar colored cherries used as a head accessory, with the outfit designed by Michael Costello and the headpiece by Piers Atkinson. Other outfits were such as a green catsuit with bell bottom "sleeves" and a blue catsuit with fabric flowing from the sleeves, both designed by Burnt Soul. She begins to perform "Froot"; following this she moves to the lower stage and performs "Savages", "Can't Pin Me Down" and "I'm A Ruin" (from 1 to 3 December 2015, "Gold"; And at some shows "Solitaire" was performed). "Forget" is performed next (At some shows, "True Colours", a Cyndi Lauper cover song was performed after "Forget"), then "Immortal", where home video footage is seen on the screens. After briefly leaving the stage, Diamandis begins the encore by performing "Happy" against a starry background; the show ends with a performance of "Blue" with snippets of the music video playing on the screens. Diamandis then thanks the audience for coming, introduces her band members, takes one final bow with her band and exits the stage.

== Critical reception ==
The tour was well-received by fans and critics and got positive reviews. Frank Mojica from the Chicago-based online magazine Consequence of Sound praised the 19 October 2015 show in Los Angeles at the Greek Theatre, calling it "A pop experience that's all pleasure and no guilt". Reviewing the 23 November Manchester concert at The Ritz, Annaliese Watkins from the Manchester Evening News gave a positive review, saying: "As always, the show was cartoonish and flashy in its production, a trait which fails to distract from Marina's incredible vocals, glorious glam-rock get-ups and ever-surprising lyrics"

== Broadcast ==
The performance on 4 November 2015 in Boston was live-streamed by Yahoo, and the show on 12 March 2016 at Lollapalooza Brasil was streamed through Internet Worldwide and TV in Brazil. On 11 November 2015 Diamandis performed an exclusive and intimate Neon Nature Tour show at the New York Hall of Science which was recorded for an episode of the Live from the Artists Den TV series. The episode was aired through television on 24 April 2016.

== Set list ==
This setlist is representative of the show on February 25, 2016. It does not represent all dates throughout the tour.

Act 1: The Family Jewels

1. "Mowgli's Road"
2. "I Am Not a Robot"
3. "Oh No!"
4. "Obsessions"
5. "Hollywood"

Act 2: Electra Heart

6. "Bubblegum Bitch"
7. "Teen Idle"
8. "How to Be a Heartbreaker"
9. "Primadonna"
10. "Lies"

Act 3: Froot

11. "Froot"
12. "Savages"
13. "Can't Pin Me Down"
14. "I'm a Ruin"
15. "Forget"
16. "Immortal"

Encore

17. "Happy"
18. "Blue"
Notes
- From October 12 to November 3, 2015, "Radioactive" was originally performed instead of "Teen Idle".
- From December 1 to 3, 2015, "Gold" was performed.
- At some shows, "Solitaire" was performed.
- At some shows, "True Colours" (Cyndi Lauper cover) was performed.

== Shows ==
Date	City	Country	Venue	Opening acts	Attendance	Revenue
North America
12 October 2015	Houston	United States	Revention Music Center	Shamir	—N/a	—N/a
13 October 2015	Austin	United States	Stubb's Waller Creek Amphitheater	Shamir	2,200 / 2,200	$61,600
14 October 2015	Dallas	United States	South Side Ballroom	Shamir	—N/a	—N/a
16 October 2015	Tempe	United States	Marquee Theatre	Shamir	—N/a	—N/a
17 October 2015	Pomona	United States	Pomona Fox Theater	Christine and the Queens	2,000 / 2,000	$60,000
19 October 2015	Los Angeles	United States	Greek Theatre	Christine and the Queens	—N/a	—N/a
20 October 2015	Oakland	United States	Fox Oakland Theatre	Christine and the Queens	—N/a	—N/a
21 October 2015	Oakland	United States	Fox Oakland Theatre	Christine and the Queens	2,800 / 2,800	$98,000
23 October 2015	Portland	United States	Roseland Theater	Christine and the Queens	—N/a	—N/a
24 October 2015	Vancouver	Canada	Commodore Ballroom	Christine and the Queens	—N/a	—N/a
25 October 2015	Seattle	United States	Paramount Theatre	Christine and the Queens	—N/a	—N/a
27 October 2015	Salt Lake City	United States	The Complex	Christine and the Queens	—N/a	—N/a
28 October 2015	Denver	United States	Ogden Theatre	Christine and the Queens	—N/a	—N/a
30 October 2015	Minneapolis	United States	Northrop Auditorium	Christine and the Queens	—N/a	—N/a
31 October 2015	Chicago	United States	Riviera Theatre	Christine and the Queens	2,510 / 2,510	$77,810
2 November 2015	Toronto	Canada	Rebel	Christine and the Queens	—N/a	—N/a
3 November 2015	Montreal	Canada	Métropolis	Christine and the Queens	2,274 / 2,274	$60,882
4 November 2015	Boston	United States	House of Blues Boston	Christine and the Queens	2,425 / 2,489	$74,085
6 November 2015	Washington, D.C.	United States	Lincoln Theatre	Christine and the Queens	—N/a	—N/a
7 November 2015	Philadelphia	United States	Electric Factory	Christine and the Queens	—N/a	—N/a
9 November 2015	New York City	United States	Terminal 5	Christine and the Queens	—N/a	—N/a
10 November 2015	New York City	United States	Terminal 5	Christine and the Queens	—N/a	—N/a
11 November 2015 (Note: The show on 11 November 2015 in New York City was an exclusive performance for the Live from the Artists Den TV series.)	New York City	United States	New York Hall of Science	—N/a	—N/a	—N/a
Europe
20 November 2015	Cambridge	England	Corn Exchange	Clock Opera	—N/a	—N/a
21 November 2015	Bournemouth	England	O_{2} Academy Bournemouth	Clock Opera	—N/a	—N/a
23 November 2015	Manchester	England	The Ritz	Rivrs	—N/a	—N/a
24 November 2015	Newcastle upon Tyne	England	O_{2} Academy Newcastle	Rivrs	—N/a	—N/a
25 November 2015	Glasgow	Scotland	O_{2} ABC Glasgow	Clock Opera	—N/a	—N/a
27 November 2015	Birmingham	England	The Institute	Clock Opera	—N/a	—N/a
28 November 2015	Cardiff	Wales	The Great Hall	Clock Opera	—N/a	—N/a
1 December 2015	Belfast	Northern Ireland	The Limelight	Clock Opera	—N/a	—N/a
2 December 2015	Dublin	Ireland	The Academy	Clock Opera	—N/a	—N/a
3 December 2015	Dublin	Ireland	The Academy	Clock Opera	—N/a	—N/a
6 December 2015	London	England	London Palladium	Clock Opera	—N/a	—N/a
16 February 2016	Glasgow	Scotland	O_{2} Academy Glasgow	Kloe	—N/a	—N/a
17 February 2016	Leeds	England	O_{2} Academy Leeds	Shura	—N/a	—N/a
18 February 2016	Manchester	England	Manchester Academy	Shura	—N/a	—N/a
20 February 2016	London	England	Roundhouse	Shura	—N/a	—N/a
21 February 2016	London	England	Roundhouse	Shura	—N/a	—N/a
24 February 2016	Brussels	Belgium	Cirque Royal	Aprile	—N/a	—N/a
25 February 2016	Utrecht	Netherlands	Tivoli	Lghtnng	—N/a	—N/a
26 February 2016	The Hague	Netherlands	Paard van Troje	PollyAnna	—N/a	—N/a
28 February 2016	Tourcoing	France	Le Grand Mix	Lys	—N/a	—N/a
29 February 2016	Stuttgart	Germany	Im Wizemann	—N/a	—N/a	—N/a
2 March 2016	Prague	Czech Republic	Incheba Arena	Light & Love	—N/a	—N/a
3 March 2016	Budapest	Hungary	Akvárium Klub	Mary PopKids	—N/a	—N/a
5 March 2016	Athens	Greece	Piraeus Academy	Ilia Darlin	—N/a	—N/a
South America
11 March 2016	São Paulo	Brazil	Audio Club	—N/a	1,552 / 3,000	$57,583
12 March 2016 (Note: The show on 12 March 2016 in São Paulo was part of Lollapalooza Brazil.)	São Paulo	Brazil	Autódromo de Interlagos	—N/a	—N/a	—N/a
16 March 2016	Buenos Aires	Argentina	Teatro Vorterix	—N/a	—N/a	—N/a
19 March 2016 (Note: The show on 19 March 2016 in Buenos Aires was part of Lollapalooza Argentina.)	San Isidro	Argentina	Hipódromo de San Isidro	—N/a	—N/a	—N/a
20 March 2016 (Note: The show on 20 March 2016 in Santiago was part of Lollapalooza Chile.)	Santiago	Chile	Parque O'Higgins	—N/a	—N/a	—N/a
Total					15,791 / 17,273 (91.4%)	$489,360
