= The Lonely Hearts Club Tour =

2012–13 concert tour by Marina and the Diamonds

- Tour by Marina and the Diamonds
- Associated album: Electra Heart
- Start date: 27 May 2012
- End date: 29 May 2013
- Legs: 5
- No. of shows: 79
- Supporting acts: Meredith Sheldon; MS MR; Foe; Foxes; Icona Pop; Charli XCX; Little Daylight

Marina and the Diamonds concert chronology
- The Family Jewels Tour (2010–11); The Lonely Hearts Club Tour (2012–13); Neon Nature Tour (2015–16)

The Lonely Hearts Club Tour was the second concert tour by Welsh singer-songwriter Marina Diamandis, formerly known as Marina and the Diamonds, in support of her second studio album, Electra Heart (2012).

== Background and development ==
The UK dates were announced on Valentine's Day with the North American dates announced in April. On 30 April 2012, it was announced that the UK segment of the tour has been rescheduled due to vocal cord condition of the artist to dates beginning on 18 June 2012. The tour ran concurrent with Coldplay's Mylo Xyloto Tour for which Marina served as an opening act. On 11 February 2013, Diamandis announced via her website and e-mail, that her European tour was cancelled. On Saturday, 4 May, Diamandis debuted the track "Electra Heart", as an interlude to her final, closing leg of the tour.

== Set lists ==
Leg 1: Europe (May–July 2012)
1. "Homewrecker"
2. "Oh No!"
3. "Mowgli's Road"
4. "Lies"
5. "I Am Not a Robot"
6. "The State of Dreaming"
7. "Power & Control"
8. "Bubblegum Bitch"
9. "Starring Role"
10. "Obsessions"
11. "Living Dead"
12. "Primadonna"
13. "Shampain"
14. "Radioactive"

Encore

15. "Teen Idle"
16. "Fear and Loathing"
17. "Hollywood"
Leg 2: North America (July–August 2012)
1. "Homewrecker"
2. "Oh No!"
3. "Mowgli's Road"
4. "Lies"
5. "I Am Not a Robot"
6. "The State of Dreaming"
7. "Power & Control"
8. "Bubblegum Bitch"
9. "Starring Role"
10. "Obsessions"
11. "Hypocrates"
12. "Primadonna"
13. "Shampain"
14. "Hollywood"
15. "Radioactive"

Encore

16. "Teen Idle"
17. "Fear and Loathing"
18. "How to Be a Heartbreaker"
Leg 3: Europe (September–November 2012)
1. "Homewrecker"
2. "Oh No!"
3. "Mowgli's Road"
4. "Lies"
5. "I Am Not a Robot"
6. "The State of Dreaming"
7. "Power & Control"
8. "Bubblegum Bitch"
9. "Starring Role"
10. "Obsessions"
11. "Valley of the Dolls"
12. "Primadonna"
13. "Shampain"
14. "Hollywood"
15. "Radioactive"
16. "Fear and Loathing"

Encore

17. "Teen Idle"
18. "How to Be a Heartbreaker"
Leg 4: North America (December 2012)
1. "Homewrecker"
2. "Oh No!"
3. "Mowgli's Road"
4. "Lies"
5. "I Am Not a Robot"
6. "The State of Dreaming"
7. "Power & Control"
8. "Bubblegum Bitch"
9. "Starring Role"
10. "Obsessions"
11. "Hollywood"
12. "Sex Yeah"
13. "Shampain"
14. "Radioactive"
15. "Primadonna"
16. "Fear and Loathing"

Encore

17. "Teen Idle"
18. "How to Be a Heartbreaker"
Leg 5: North America (May 2013)
1. "Electra Heart" (intro)
2. "Homewrecker"
3. "Oh No!"
4. "Bubblegum Bitch"
5. "I Am Not a Robot"
6. "Lies"
7. "The State of Dreaming"
8. "Power & Control"
9. "Mowgli's Road"
10. "Starring Role"
11. "Obsessions"
12. "Numb"
13. "Radioactive"
14. "Shampain"
15. "Primadonna"
16. "Hollywood"
17. "Fear and Loathing"

Encore

18. "Teen Idle"
19. "How to Be a Heartbreaker"

=== Notes ===
- At the 29 and 30 June 2012 shows, "How to Be a Heartbreaker" was performed between "Primadonna" and "Shampain".
- "Lonely Hearts Club" was performed as the opening song at the following 2012 dates: 30 September, 2, 4, 5, 6, 8, 14 and 15 October.
- "Hypocrates" was performed as the second song of the encore at the 9, 11 and 13 October 2012 dates.
- At the 14 October 2012 show, "Living Dead" was performed as the second song of the encore.
- "E.V.O.L" was performed at the 20 May 2013 date between "Radioactive" and "Shampain".

== Opening acts ==
- Meredith Sheldon Leg 1: United Kingdom
- MS MR Leg 1: North America
- Foe Leg 2: United Kingdom
- Foxes Leg 2: United Kingdom
- Icona Pop Leg 2: North America
- Charli XCX Leg 3: North America
- Little Daylight (Dates without Charli XCX) Leg 3: North America

== Tour dates ==
Date	City	Country	Venue
Europe
27 May 2012	Berlin	Germany	Astra Kulturhaus (Melt! Weekender)
5 June 2012	Hamburg	Germany	Uebel & Gefährlich
7 June 2012	Crans-près-Céligny	Switzerland	Caribana Festival
15 June 2012	Aarhus	Denmark	Northside Festival
16 June 2012	Hultsfred	Sweden	Hultsfred Festival
18 June 2012	Norwich	United Kingdom	The Waterfront
20 June 2012	Glasgow	United Kingdom	O2 ABC Glasgow
21 June 2012	Edinburgh	United Kingdom	The Queen's Hall
22 June 2012	Manchester	United Kingdom	Manchester Cathedral
24 June 2012	Royal Leamington Spa	United Kingdom	The Assembly
25 June 2012	London	United Kingdom	The Tabernacle
27 June 2012	Cardiff	United Kingdom	Coal Exchange
29 June 2012	Birmingham	United Kingdom	Digbeth Institute
30 June 2012	Sheffield	United Kingdom	The Leadmill
1 July 2012	Weston-super-Mare	United Kingdom	T4 on the Beach
North America
10 July 2012	Los Angeles	United States	The Music Box
11 July 2012	San Francisco	United States	The Fillmore
13 July 2012	Portland	United States	Aladdin Theater
14 July 2012	Seattle	United States	Showbox at the Market
15 July 2012	Vancouver	Canada	Commodore Ballroom
18 July 2012	Denver	United States	The Summit
21 July 2012	Chicago	United States	Park West
14 August 2012	Washington, D.C.	United States	9:30 Club
16 August 2012	New York City	United States	Webster Hall
17 August 2012	Philadelphia	United States	The TLA
18 August 2012	New York City	United States	Webster Hall
Europe
30 September 2012	Leeds	United Kingdom	Leeds Metropolitan University
2 October 2012	Dundee	United Kingdom	Fat Sam's Dundee
4 October 2012	Liverpool	United Kingdom	O2 Academy Liverpool
5 October 2012	Preston	United Kingdom	53 Degrees Preston
6 October 2012	Manchester	United Kingdom	Manchester Academy
8 October 2012	Leicester	United Kingdom	O2 Academy Leicester
9 October 2012	Wolverhampton	United Kingdom	Wulfrun Hall
11 October 2012	London	United Kingdom	London Forum
13 October 2012	Bristol	United Kingdom	O2 Academy Bristol
14 October 2012	Lincoln	United Kingdom	Engine Shed
15 October 2012	Oxford	United Kingdom	O2 Academy Oxford
20 November 2012	Dublin	Ireland	Olympia Theatre
22 November 2012	Utrecht	Netherlands	Tivoli (Utrecht)
23 November 2012	Hamburg	Germany	Markthalle
24 November 2012	Geneva	Switzerland	Salle des Fêtes de Carouge
26 November 2012	Zurich	Switzerland	X-Tra
27 November 2012	Munich	Germany	Muffathalle
28 November 2012	Cologne	Germany	Gloria
29 November 2012	Berlin	Germany	Astra
North America
3 December 2012	Toronto	Canada	Kool Haus
4 December 2012	Philadelphia	United States	Union Transfer
6 December 2012	New York City	United States	Terminal 5
7 December 2012	Huntington	United States	The Paramount
8 December 2012	Boston	United States	House of Blues
9 December 2012	Baltimore	United States	Rams Head Live!
11 December 2012	Charlotte	United States	The Fillmore Charlotte
12 December 2012	Atlanta	United States	Center Stage Atlanta
14 December 2012	Fort Lauderdale	United States	Culture Room
17 December 2012	Houston	United States	The Ballroom at Warehouse Live
15 December 2012	Orlando	United States	The Beacham
18 December 2012	Austin	United States	Emo's
19 December 2012	Dallas	United States	Granada Theater (Dallas)
2 May 2013	Seattle	United States	Showbox SoDo
3 May 2013	Vancouver	Canada	Commodore Ballroom
4 May 2013	Portland	United States	Wonder Ballroom
6 May 2013	San Francisco	United States	Warfield
7 May 2013	Santa Ana	United States	Observatory
9 May 2013	Las Vegas	United States	Boulevard Pool at The Cosmopolitan of Las Vegas
10 May 2013	San Diego	United States	House of Blues
11 May 2013	Los Angeles	United States	Shrine Auditorium
13 May 2013	Salt Lake City	United States	Club Sound
14 May 2013	Denver	United States	Gothic
16 May 2013	Lawrence	United States	Granada
17 May 2013	St. Louis	United States	The Pageant
19 May 2013	Minneapolis	United States	Skyway Theater
20 May 2013	Chicago	United States	Riviera Theater
22 May 2013	Detroit	United States	St. Andrews
23 May 2013	Toronto	Canada	Echo Beach
24 May 2013	Montreal	Canada	Metropolis
25 May 2013 ^{A}	Boston	United States	City Hall Plaza
28 May 2013	Pittsburgh	United States	Stage AE
29 May 2013	New York City	United States	Rumsey Playfield

- A Boston Calling Music Festival Show

== Box office score data ==
Venue	City	Tickets Sold / Available	Gross Revenue
The Music Box	Los Angeles	1,200 / 1,200 (100%)	$27,000
Park West	Chicago	1,000 / 1,000 (100%)	$22,000
9:30 Club	Washington DC	1,200 / 1,200 (100%)	$26,400
Emo's	Austin	1,500 / 1,500 (100%)	$27,000
Riviera Theatre	Chicago	2,500 / 2,500 (100%)	$62,500
Metropolis	Montreal	2,263 / 2,263 (100%)	$54,648
Stage AE	Pittsburgh	1,501 / 2,300 (65%)	$33,022
