= Hypocrates =

Hypocrates may refer to:

- portmanteau of the word hypocrite and Hippocrates
- Hypocrates (song), by Welsh singer MARINA Diamandis
