= How to Be a Heartbreaker =

Single by Marina and the Diamonds

from the album Electra Heart
- Released: 7 December 2012
- Recorded: 2012
- Genre: Pop
- Length: 3:41
- Label: 679; Atlantic
- Songwriters: Marina Diamandis; Lukasz Gottwald; Henry Walter; Benjamin Levin; Ammar Malik; Daniel Omelio
- Producers: Dr. Luke; Cirkut; Benny Blanco

Marina and the Diamonds singles chronology
"Power & Control" (2012)	"How to Be a Heartbreaker" (2012)	"Froot" (2014)

Music video
- "How to Be a Heartbreaker" on YouTube

"How to Be a Heartbreaker" is a song by Welsh singer Marina Diamandis, released under the stage name Marina and the Diamonds, from her second studio album, Electra Heart (2012). It was released on 7 December 2012 by 679 Artists and Atlantic Records as the album's third and final single. Diamandis worked with Ammar Malik, Benny Blanco, Cirkut, Daniel Omelio, and Dr. Luke during the songwriting process, and enlisted Blanco, Cirkut, and Dr. Luke to oversee its production.

== Background and release ==
Diamandis explained that "How to Be a Heartbreaker" was the only new track on the US edition of her album Electra Heart, and she wrote it "as the UK album was being printed." Lyrically, she stated the song "basically involves four rules on how to be a heartbreaker. It's a guide for everyone!" Despite initially confirming to Digital Spy that "How to Be a Heartbreaker" would be released in the United Kingdom on 15 October 2012, Diamandis ultimately stated via her Twitter page on 22 November 2012 that the UK release of the song would be postponed until spring 2013 because of her US tour in December.

== Music video ==
Diamandis in the song’s music video

On 19 September 2012, Marina announced on her Twitter page that the music video for "How to Be a Heartbreaker" would premiere online on 24 September. However, problems occurred on the day of the supposed release, and Diamandis took to her Twitter to explain the situation: "So, someone at my record label won't let me release the video because I look ugly in it apparently and we need more money and time to paint out ugly parts. The video will be out end of the week. If not, I am happy to leak the 'minger' version for my fans." The video premiered on 28 September 2012 on YouTube. Marina also worked on the song for about 6 months prior to being released.

The video was directed by duo Marc & Ish and filmed in late August 2012. It opens with Diamandis in a shower surrounded by Speedo-clad male models. It includes various close-up shots of Diamandis and the models throughout the video. She also appears with four different men in various settings, each showing her with a different colored hair ribbon. It includes shots of her walking alone on the beach in some parts of the video, and includes a shot of her holding a platter with a severed and bloodied mannequin head. She dons black hair and various black dresses throughout the video, and her signature heart makeup on her cheek.

== Commercial performance ==
"How to Be a Heartbreaker" was released as the third single off Electra Heart. The song was a commercial success worldwide. In the United Kingdom the song peaked at number 88 and spent one week on the chart. The song ranks as Marina's fifth best-selling track to date in the United Kingdom, with 95,000 combined sales as of February 2019. "How to Be a Heartbreaker" was certified Silver in the United Kingdom in November 2021, denoting sales in excess of 200,000 units. In Denmark the song peaked at number 18 and was certified Platinum. The single was certified Platinum by the Recording Industry Association of America (RIAA) in June 2021.

== Live performances ==
Diamandis first performed "How to Be a Heartbreaker" live on 29 June 2012 on The Lonely Hearts Club Tour at the HMV Institute in Birmingham. She has since performed the song during most of her Lonely Hearts Club Tour performances and opening performances on Coldplay's Mylo Xyloto Tour, occasionally adding another breakdown after the second chorus. On 9 July 2012, she performed the song on Jimmy Kimmel Live! along with "Primadonna". She has performed the song acoustically on various radio stations and television appearances in Europe and Canada. She also performed the song as part of her "YouTube Presents" streaming performance along with four other songs from Electra Heart on 15 August 2012. Diamandis performed "How to Be a Heartbreaker" live on the season finale of Denmark's X Factor on 22 March 2013, along with "Primadonna".

== Other versions ==
The song was covered by Dean Geyer and Lea Michele on the Glee episode "Feud".

== Track listings ==
- UK and Irish digital download (EP)
1. "How to Be a Heartbreaker" – 3:41
2. "How to Be a Heartbreaker" (Kat Krazy remix) – 3:34
3. "How to Be a Heartbreaker" (Almighty remix) – 5:37
4. "How to Be a Heartbreaker" (Kitty Pryde remix) – 3:00
5. "How to Be a Heartbreaker" (Baunz remix) – 7:27
- Canadian and US digital download (remixes)
1. "How to Be a Heartbreaker" (Dada Life remix) – 6:28
2. "How to Be a Heartbreaker" (Dada Life remix radio edit) – 3:16

== Charts ==
Chart performance for "How to Be a Heartbreaker"
Chart (2012–2013)	Peak position
Denmark (Tracklisten)	18
Finland Download (Latauslista)	23
Hungary (Rádiós Top 40)	29
Ireland (IRMA)	21
Poland (Polish Airplay New)	3
Scotland Singles (Official Charts)	73
UK Singles (Official Charts)	88
US Pop Digital Songs (Billboard)	42

== Certifications ==
Certifications for "How to Be a Heartbreaker"
Region	Certification	Certified units/sales
New Zealand (RMNZ)	Gold	15,000^{‡}
United Kingdom (BPI)	Silver	200,000^{‡}
United States (RIAA)	Platinum	1,000,000^{‡}
Streaming
Denmark (IFPI Danmark) Streaming	Platinum	1,800,000^{†}
^{‡} Sales+streaming figures based on certification alone.^{†} Streaming-only figures based on certification alone.

== Release history ==
Release dates and formats for "How to Be a Heartbreaker"
Region	Date	Format	Version(s)	Label(s)	Ref.
Ireland	7 December 2012	Digital download	Original; Kat Krazy remix; Almighty remix; Kitty Pryde remix; Baunz remix	679; Atlantic	
United States	8 January 2013	Contemporary hit radio	Original	Elektra	
United Kingdom	3 February 2013	Digital download	Original; Kat Krazy remix; Almighty remix; Kitty Pryde remix; Baunz remix	679; Atlantic	
Canada	12 March 2013	Digital download	Remixes	Elektra	
United States	12 March 2013	Digital download	Remixes	Elektra	
