= Meredith Sheldon =

American singer-songwriter (born 1988)

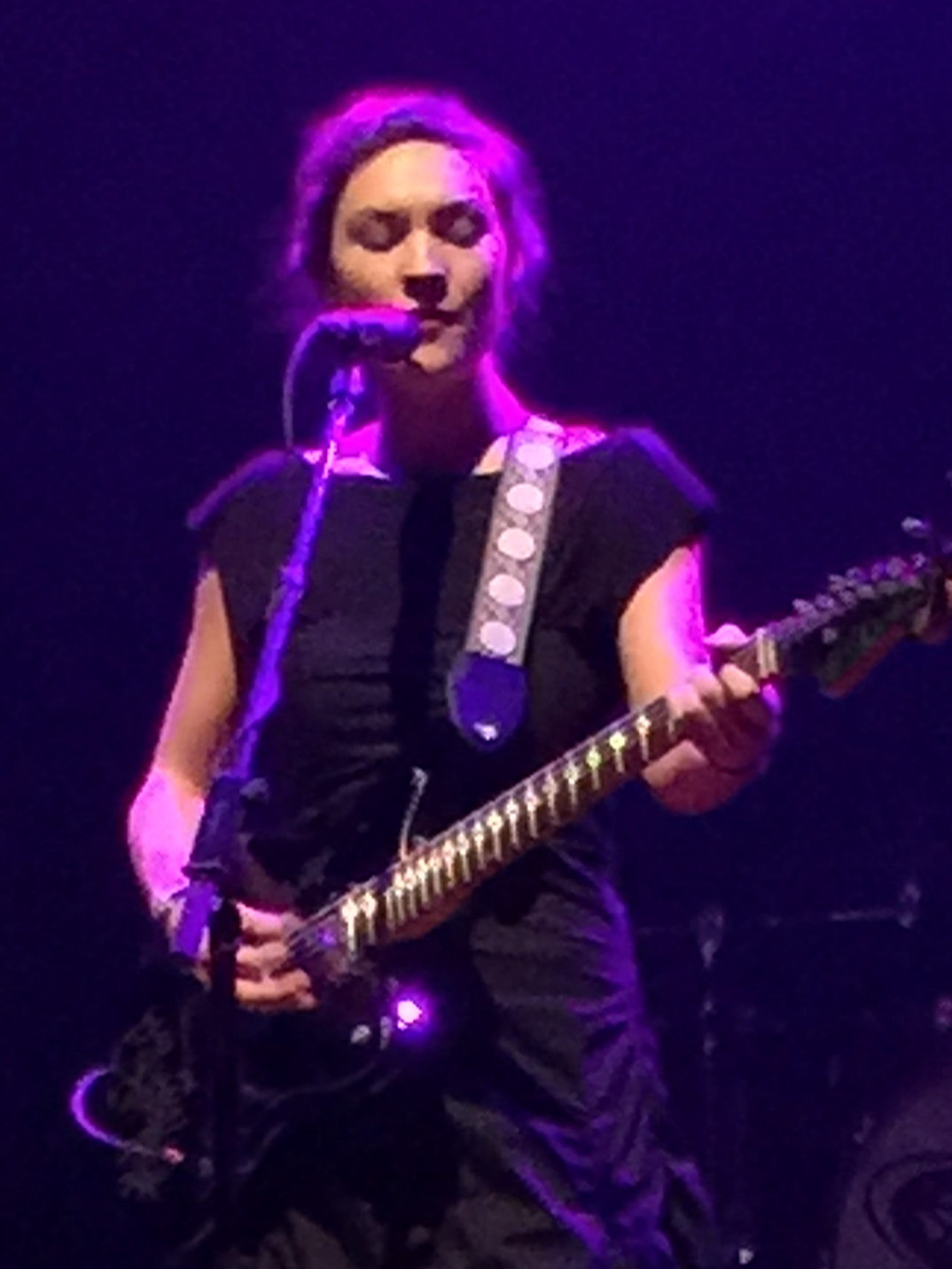
- Sheldon in 2014

Background information
- Born: Meredith Lucia Sheldon; October 20, 1988 (age 37); Berkeley, California, United States
- Origin: Massachusetts, United States
- Genres: Rock music, Alternative music, Grunge, Indie rock, Pop rock
- Occupations: Singer-songwriter, Recording artist, Touring musician
- Instruments: Voice, guitar, bass guitar
- Label: Bandcamp (unsigned)
- Website: meredithsheldon.com

Meredith Lucia Sheldon (born October 20, 1988) is an American musician from Massachusetts. She credits Evan Dando with giving her a leg up in the music business, being an early supporter of her demos, and says the same of Marina and the Diamonds.

Meredith was the original bassist and backing vocals for Family of the Year. After leaving the band, she toured as support on first leg of Marina and the Diamonds' The Lonely Hearts Club Tour. She also toured with Dando-led The Lemonheads. At least for some time in 2012 she appeared on stage with Jen Turner, bassist, as part of a project referred to in the contemporary reviews as Alamar. In 2013 and 2014 she toured in support of Johnny Marr, opening for all his shows.

== Personal information ==
Sheldon lives on Martha's Vineyard.

== Discography ==
- MLS (Digital album, EP) Bandcamp
- A La Mar (Sketches, Single) Bandcamp
- A La Mar 2 (Sketches, Single) Bandcamp
- A La Mar 3 (Sketches, Single) Bandcamp
- TBA (LP, 2015)
