= Teen Idle =

Song by Marina and the Diamonds

from the album Electra Heart
- Released: April 27, 2012
- Recorded: 2011
- Studio: The Ivory Tower
- Genre: Pop
- Length: 4:14
- Label: 679; Atlantic
- Songwriter: Marina Diamandis
- Producer: Liam Howe

Live video
- "Teen Idle" on YouTube

"Teen Idle" is a song by Welsh singer-songwriter Marina Diamandis, professionally known as Marina and formerly as Marina and the Diamonds. The ninth track on her second studio album, Electra Heart (2012), it was released on 27 April 2012 along with the whole record. While the production was handled by Liam Howe, the song was written solely by Diamandis.

Too obscure to be released as a single, almost not even making to the final tracklist of the album, the track received a warm reception from her fanbase and grew to become a substantial song in Diamandis' discography, which is noted to define the Tumblr "sad girl" subculture and did influence later singers like Billie Eilish and Melanie Martinez.

The song incorporates eerie downtempo music as the lyrics articulate problems with youth lifestyles and include metaphors for the issues such as the loss of virginity, eating disorders, and suicide. The ingenious title exudes the contrast between the absurdity of an idolized teenage dream media portrayal and adolescent depression. "Teen Idle" was the second non-single track from Marina's discography to be certified Gold in the United States, following a TikTok-revived sleeper hit, "Bubblegum Bitch".

== Background ==
The title "Teen Idle" is a play on a phrase "teen idol". In February 2011, during London Fashion Week, Marina attended a fashion show for one of her favourite London designers, Ashish, among whose new collection she saw a grey knitted jumper with "Teen Idle" written on it. Thinking it would be funny to rhyme "idle" with "suicidal", she decided to write the song about youth and specifically how she did not live out her teen years the way she wished she had.

Marina was in Los Angeles in late March to write new tracks, on the 25th she was in the studio and the next day she tweeted a part of the song.

When the album tracklist was being completed, Marina's manager at the time did not want the song on the album to be included, suggesting Marina to limit the number of songs to eleven. Marina did not acquiesce to this decision, saying that he as a middle-aged man would not understand the lyrics at all. Afterwards, when Electra Heart got released, "Teen Idle" quickly became one of the most popular tracks on the record. "It just kind of goes to show sometimes your artistic instincts are right, and that's what should be heard", said Marina. In 2019, her new manager called the fact that the music video was not made for the song "outrageous". However, a high quality video of a live performance at The Tabernacle in London from June 2012 was uploaded to her official YouTube channel in July 2012.

=== Lyrical composition ===
"Teen Idle" is a ballad telling a story of a depressed teenage girl and her disappointment in glamourised youth portrayal and a façade of adolescence perfection in mass media. In the song, Marina discusses the loss of virginity, narcissism, religion, alcohol, suicide attempts, eating disorders as well as adhering to society's standards. "Teen Idle" was noted for becoming massively popular among teenage Tumblr users, reposting or covering the lyrics on their blogs. The fact that so many people would relate to the song having "too specific and obscure" lyrics Marina found "the biggest shock on the album". As noticed by the press, "not every teen experiences thoughts as negative as these, but Marina takes these seemingly mature issues and makes them accessible to teens." In an interview to PopDirt, Diamandis explained:

Lyrically, it's a strange song, as it crosses polar opposite themes – innocence and darkness. I had waited a long time to write that song and it helped me acknowledge some experiences that I'd had in my teenage years. Ages 16-20 were kind of blackout years for me, like I didn't even live them or they didn't belong to my life. I don't really remember them. It's most definitely one of my fan base's favorite songs on Electra Heart. I'm really proud of it. The nicest thing about being an artist is realizing that a feeling or experience you had that you always thought was really obscure or embarrassing, is in fact very common, and that we all deal with pretty much the same stuff in one way or another."

== Critical reception ==
Complimented by Del Rey herself, "Teen Idle" was compared to the sounds of Lana Del Rey and Kate Bush. According to Drowned in Sound, "Teen Idle" as well as "Primadonna" are represented by "what seems like endless cheerleader choruses, set against misery and drowning in their own self-conscious irony." The Guardian praised "Teen Idle" as one of the album's highlights, which "strip back most of that album's excesses to let the melodies breathe and focus attention on Diamandis's singing: coolly enunciated and slightly folky, her voice is much more appealing than you might have realised, overshadowed as it was on The Family Jewels by her apparently unquenchable desire to shriek, deploy a horrible vibrato and do animal impersonations." As observed, it "twists the cynicism of the whole Electra Heart concept into an intriguingly nasty lyric that subverts the message of a million Hollywood teen films by apparently suggesting adolescents would be better off trying to curry favour with the vacuous social elite in their school than expressing their individuality". However, Pitchfork named the song a "horrible, glitchy ballad that sounds as though it was recorded in a church."

American singer Billie Eilish praised "Teen Idle" in both the third episode of Me & Dad Radio, her own radio show, admiring the controversial straightforward lyricism and saying "it was like the first time she heard a song about actual depression", as well as in an interview to Los 40 where she named it "the best song in the f-ing world".

American singer Melanie Martinez praised "Teen Idle" in an interview to celebrity news website Hollywire, answering a question about a song that "she wishes she had written", saying "the lyrics are perfect and the melodies are insane".

== Certifications ==
Certifications for "Teen Idle"
Region	Certification	Certified units/sales
United States (RIAA)	Gold	500,000^{‡}
^{‡} Sales+streaming figures based on certification alone.
