= Power & Control =

Single by Marina and the Diamonds

from the album Electra Heart
- Released: 20 July 2012
- Genre: Electropop; power pop; dance-pop
- Length: 3:46
- Label: 679; Atlantic
- Songwriters: Marina Diamandis; Steve Angello
- Producer: Greg Kurstin

Marina and the Diamonds singles chronology
"Primadonna" (2012)	"Power & Control" (2012)	"How to Be a Heartbreaker" (2012)

Music video
- "Power & Control" on YouTube

"Power & Control" is a song by Welsh singer Marina Diamandis, released under the stage name Marina and the Diamonds, from her second studio album, Electra Heart (2012). It was released on 20 July 2012 by 679 Artists and Atlantic Records as the second single from the record. Diamandis collaborated with Swedish House Mafia member Steve Angello while writing the track, and enlisted Greg Kurstin to oversee its production. An electropop, power pop, and dance-pop track, "Power & Control" describes the struggle between romantic partners in achieving superiority in their relationship.

"Power & Control" was hailed by contemporary music critics as a stand-out track from Electra Heart. However, the song peaked at number 193 on the UK Singles Chart, and failed to impact additional record charts internationally. An accompanying music video for "Power & Control" was directed by Casper Balslev and released on 30 May 2012. Its simplistic concept received generally favourable reviews from critics.

== Background and composition ==
"Power & Control"
A sample of the chorus of "Power & Control".

In June 2012, it was announced that "Power & Control" would be released as the second single from Diamandis' second studio album Electra Heart (2012). It followed the lead single "Primadonna", which was premiered on 13 March 2012. "Power & Control" was written by Diamandis and Swedish House Mafia member Steve Angello; it was produced by Greg Kurstin at Echo Studio in Los Angeles, California and was later mixed by Serban Ghenea at MixStar Studios in Virginia Beach, Virginia. Jessie Shatkin, John Hanes, and Kurstin handled the engineering of the track, while the latter was additionally responsible for the programming and played the keyboards, guitar, and bass. Tim Roberts and Phil Seaford are credited with assisting throughout the process.

According to Diamandis, "Power & Control" details "the power struggle in relationships [where] there's always one person who wants the upper hand." It draws stylistic inspiration from "spacey synths and barely-there beats with a haunting chorus", which struck Robert Copsey from Digital Spy as a stark contrast from the musical elements showcased in "Primadonna". Noted for its prominent experimentation with electropop, power pop, and dance-pop styles, the track has received comparisons to the catalogs of Swedish group ABBA and American recording artist Lady Gaga. Diamandis' vocal delivery is treated with a "layered" effect throughout "Power & Control", and is complemented by its subtle "hammering beats", "dance floor pulsations", and piano instrumentation.

== Reception ==
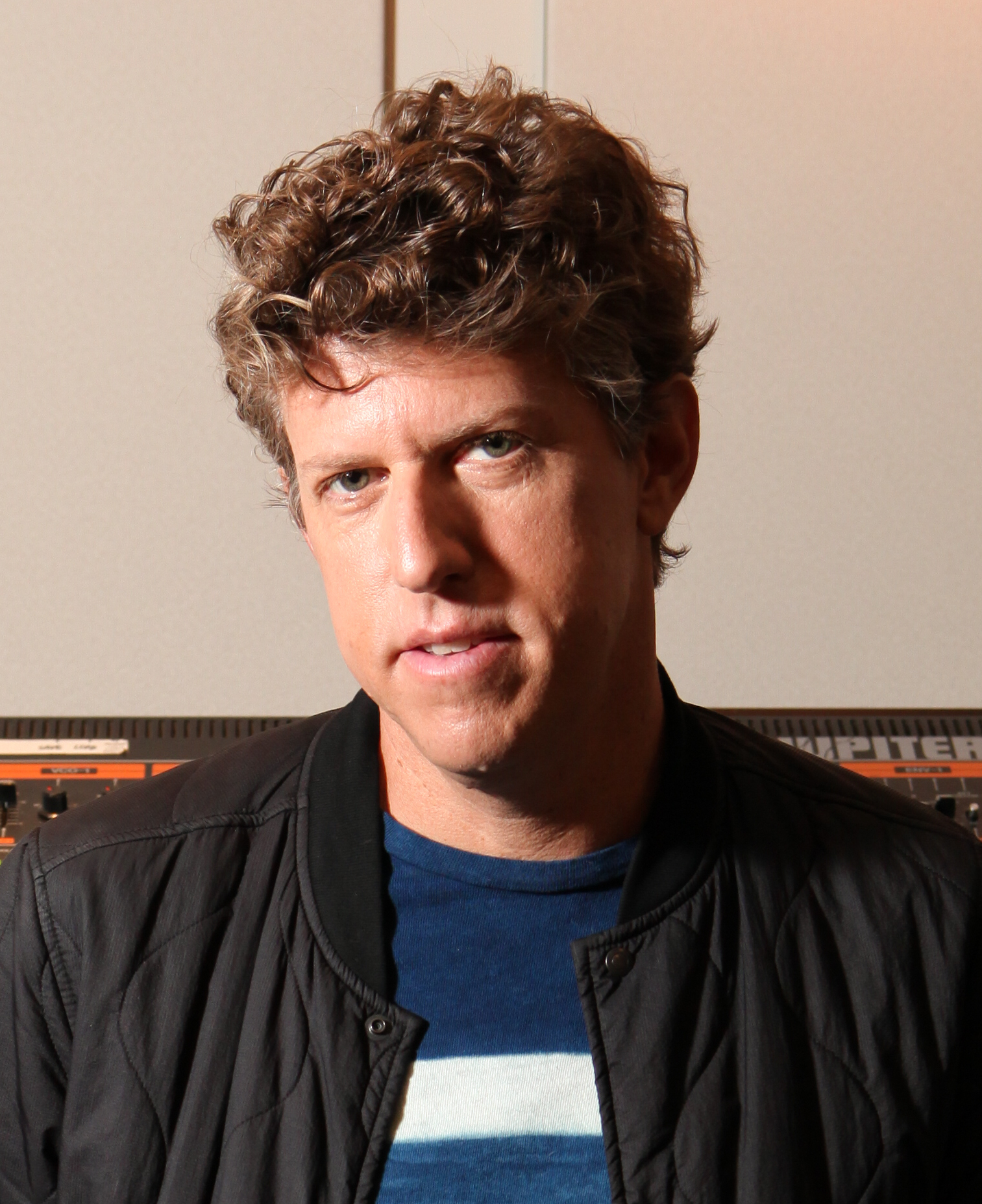
Greg Kurstin (pictured) co-produced four tracks for Electra Heart, one of which was "Power & Control".

"Power & Control" received generally favorable reviews from contemporary music critics. Surprised by the relatively lackluster reviews Electra Heart received upon its release, Rich Juzwiak from Gawker recognized "Power & Control" as a highlight from its parent record; he felt that the exaggerated pronunciation of the word "make" in the refrain provided the track with "at least half of its hookiness", and praised the line "you may be good looking but you're not a piece of art" as "the best take-down I've heard in a pop song all year." Josh Webb from WhatCulture simply opined that the song was "amazing", and focused less on the "deep psychological messages being conveyed" and more on his appreciation for "good pop music."

Writing for MuuMuse, Bradley Stern classified the song as "a personal favorite from the album", and spoke favorably of its "surging chorus" that felt "ready to split at the seams at any second." Robert Copsey from Digital Spy gave the track three out of five stars; he jokingly noted that Diamandis comes across as the dominant person in a relationship, citing the "anguish" in her vocals as an indication that "this man doesn't stand a chance." However, Ben Hewitt from NME was disappointed by "Power & Control"; he felt that its production was "anaemic" and "piss-weak", and criticized the lyrics "Women and men we are the same / But love will always be a game" for sounding like an excerpt from a self-help book. In 2012, the track was nominated for the Popjustice £20 Music Prize, although it lost to "Jealousy" by Will Young.

"Power & Control" debuted at number 193 on the UK Singles Chart; it underperformed by comparison with "Primadonna", which peaked at number 11 in the United Kingdom.

== Music video ==
Marina Diamandis in the music video for Power & Control

An accompanying music video for "Power & Control" was directed by Casper Balslev; it was released on 30 May 2012 as the sixth installment of her eleven-part "The Archetypes" video series. A blue tint is applied throughout the clip; it takes place in an empty mansion, presumably the same location where the music video for "Primadonna" was filmed. A blonde Diamandis is seen engaging in a series of mind games with her romantic interest. Rich Juzwiak from Gawker appreciated a reference to the music video for "Freedom! '90" by George Michael, which he complimented as "a nice touch". Bradley Stern from MuuMuse stated that the clip was "absolutely gorgeous" despite its simplistic concept; he enjoyed the appearance of a Newton's cradle in the beginning of the video, and felt that it represented the lyrics "you can't have peace without a war" by exemplifying that the concept that "for every action, there is an equal and opposite reaction". Writing for WhatCulture, Josh Webb thought that it was interesting to see an "understated" Diamandis in the clip, and stated that the overall product was an "aesthetically very pleasing" visual. Referencing the emptiness of the mansion, Eliot Glazer from Vulture jokingly offered to "suggest an interior decorator".

== Track listing ==
"Power & Control" – Remix EP
No.	Title	Length
1.	"Power & Control" (Michael Woods Remix)	6:38
2.	"Power & Control" (Eliphino Remix)	4:42
3.	"Power & Control" (Brackles – Drum and Squares Remix)	4:26
4.	"Power & Control" (Krystal Klear Remix)	3:54
5.	"Power & Control" (Brackles – Dub Mix)	4:49
Total length:		24:29

== Credits and personnel ==
=== Song credits ===
Credits adapted from the liner notes of Electra Heart.

Recording

- Produced at Echo Studio (Los Angeles, California)
- Mixed at MixStar Studios (Virginia Beach, Virginia)

Personnel

- Marina Diamandis – songwriter
- Steve Angello – songwriter
- Greg Kurstin – keyboards, programming, guitar, bass, engineering, producer
- Jessie Shatkin – engineering
- Serban Ghenea – mixing
- John Hanes – engineering
- Tim Roberts – assisting
- Phil Seaford – assisting

=== Video credits ===
Credits adapted from Balslev's website.

- Casper Balslev – director
- Natricia Bernard – choreographer
- Will Bex – DP
- Mark Connell – art director
- Celestine Cooney – stylist
- Darren Evans – hair
- Jason Ewart – Steadicam op
- Jen Farrell – production manager
- Love – production company
- Lasse Marcussen – grade
- Nathan Matthews – gaffe
- Paul McKee – executive producer
- Alan Parks – commissioner
- Niamh Quinn – make-up
- Sarah Rollason – focus puller
- James Rose – editor
- Rachel Rumbold – producer
- Lucy Sanderson – set dresser
- Regina Sinatra – set dresser
- Stephanie Zari – Ist AD

== Charts ==
Chart (2012)	Peak position
UK Singles (OCC)	193

== Release history ==
Country	Date	Format	Label	Ref.
United Kingdom	20 July 2012	Digital download – remix EP	679; Atlantic	
