= Electra Heart (song) =

2014 song by Betatraxx

Promotional single by Betatraxx featuring Marina and the Diamonds
- Released: May 5, 2014
- Genre: Pop
- Length: 3:43
- Label: Pilot
- Songwriters: Timothy Nelson; Marina Diamandis
- Producer: Betatraxx

Music video
- "Electra Heart" on YouTube

"Electra Heart" is a song recorded and produced by American disc jockey Betatraxx. It features guest vocals from Welsh singer-songwriter Marina Diamandis, released under the stage name Marina and the Diamonds, who co-wrote the track with him. Diamandis first used the song in a music video in August 2013, as part of a visual series created to promote her second studio album, Electra Heart (2012). The finalized version of "Electra Heart" was digitally distributed as a promotional single on May 5, 2014, through Pilot Records. A classical version and two remixes of the song, including one by Teddy Killerz, were released shortly after.

Lyrically, "Electra Heart" serves as the end to the fictitious Electra Heart persona that Diamandis invented for her album, effectively killing the character. The song's genre was labeled as pop, while the Teddy Killerz Remix was called a dance track. The multiple releases of "Electra Heart" received generally favorable reviews from music critics, with one of them referring to the original version as a satisfying conclusion to Diamandis' album. The song's accompanying music video is a compilation that features Diamandis ending her persona's life, concluding the Electra Heart era.

== Background and release ==
In 2012, Welsh singer-songwriter Marina Diamandis, using the stage name Marina and the Diamonds, released her second studio album, Electra Heart. A concept album described as "a visual project", it discusses a fictitious persona named Electra Heart, invented by Diamandis, to represent popular female American archetypes. She explored four different ones on the album, including "Homewrecker", "Beauty Queen", "Housewife", and "Idle Teen". To effectively end the persona's life, the song "Electra Heart" was created to complete the era.

Betatraxx, the stage name of American disc jockey Timothy Nelson, first produced "Electra Heart" for a music video on Diamandis' official YouTube channel. It was featured in the finale to her 11-part Electra Heart-themed video series, uploaded on August 8, 2013. Despite the 2013 video appearance, "Electra Heart" was not formally released for another year, due to unknown circumstances. The song was first sent out for digital download and streaming on May 5, 2014, through Pilot Records, in the United States and Canada. Additionally, Betatraxx created a classical, instrumental rendition of "Electra Heart". It was digitally released to North and South American countries on June 9, 2014, through Psi Sci Records, and lasts 6 minutes and 38 seconds. Diamandis is credited as a featured artist on the original release of the track, but her role is omitted from the classical version. "Electra Heart" is not featured on Diamandis' Electra Heart, despite sharing the same name. The song was written by Betatraxx and Diamandis, with the former solely handling the production and being credited as a composer on the song's classical mix.

Betatraxx remixed a new version of "Electra Heart" and released it as a free download, via his SoundCloud profile, on May 24, 2014. Russian and Ukrainian music group Teddy Killerz also remixed the song, and digitally distributed it in June 2014. In 2022, for the 10th anniversary of Electra Heart, the track and "E.V.O.L." were remastered and put on the platinum blonde edition of the album, also allowing them to be played on vinyl for the first time.

== Music and lyrics ==
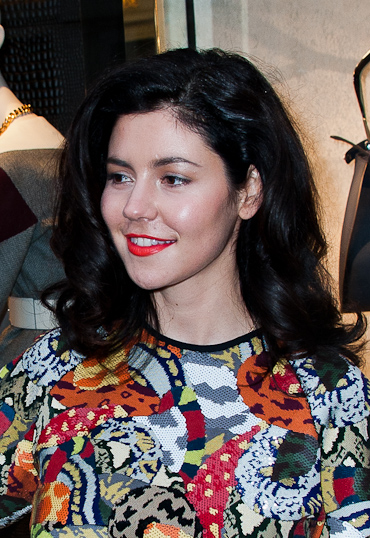
"Electra Heart" features guest vocals from Marina and the Diamonds (shown), who first used the song for a music video she released in August 2013.

Musically, "Electra Heart" has been described as a pop song. Besides the original version of the song, the Teddy Killerz Remix was described as a dance track that suits Diamandis' vocals, while the Betatraxx remix was noted for its "hard hitting bass that [was] infused with a classical undertone," according to a writer for The DNA Life. Khris Davenport from Complex noted that the remix added "some tough electro-fied beats" to the instrumentation, including some "nods to '90s-era breaks sounds".

According to its sheet music, "Electra Heart" is set in the time signature of common time, and has a moderately fast tempo of 128 beats per minute. The song is composed in the key of F minor and is largely instrumental, with just one set of lyrics throughout. It opens with Diamandis introducing herself as "I'm Electra, I'm Electra Heart" to the chord progression of Am-Am-Dm. Given the song's subject matter regarding the Electra Heart character, it has been described as a swan song.

== Reception and promotion ==
The different versions of "Electra Heart" received generally positive reviews from music critics. The song was lauded by On Campus's Amer El-Mousa, who explained that the song is exactly what Diamandis' fans wanted, acknowledging that it was the final release from Electra Heart. She continued, saying: "Marina did wonders with her era and we hope to see more of her soon." In 2019, Ryan Roschke from PopSugar featured "Electra Heart" on his list of the 35 best songs to play at Halloween parties. Davenport, reviewing the Teddy Killerz remix of "Electra Heart", praised it, describing it as "hot and heavy" and "proper rage music"; he also expressed shock that Diamandis' "vocals [we]ren't twisted in different dance music directions on a more regular basis".

The accompanying 2013 music video for "Electra Heart" features the original version of the song. It was directed and edited by British visual artist Margarita Louca. The clip is a compilation of the 11 others from her Electra Heart series, which began with parent album track "Fear and Loathing". One scene was filmed specifically for "Electra Heart", with Diamandis returning with a "long hair" look. Just like the song, the video finds Diamandis killing off the Electra Heart character. Diamandis appears in a number of outfits and scenes, to which Fuse summarized: "fans saw the singer go blonde, shower with male models and eat the saddest meal ever". Alongside its release to YouTube, Diamandis posted on her Twitter account: "Goodbye, Electra Heart!".

== Track listings ==
Digital download/streaming
No.	Title	Length
1.	"Electra Heart" (featuring Marina and the Diamonds)	3:43

Digital download/streaming – classical version
No.	Title	Length
1.	"Electra Heart" (classical version)	6:38

== Credits and personnel ==
Credits adapted from Tidal.

- Timothy Nelson – performer, composer
- Marina Diamandis – performer

== Release history ==
Release dates and formats for "Electra Heart"
Region	Date	Formats	Version	Label	Ref.
Canada	May 5, 2014	Digital download; streaming	Original	Pilot	
United States	May 5, 2014	Digital download; streaming	Original	Pilot	
North America	June 9, 2014	Digital download; streaming	Classical	Psi Sci	
South America	June 9, 2014	Digital download; streaming	Classical	Psi Sci	
