= Primadonna (Marina and the Diamonds song) =

2012 single by Marina and the Diamonds

Single by Marina and the Diamonds

from the album Electra Heart
- Released: 20 March 2012
- Recorded: October 2011
- Genre: Dance-pop; electropop; Europop; disco-pop
- Length: 3:38
- Label: 679; Atlantic
- Songwriters: Marina Diamandis; Julie Frost; Lukasz Gottwald; Henry Walter
- Producers: Dr. Luke; Cirkut

Marina and the Diamonds singles chronology
"Shampain" (2010)	"Primadonna" (2012)	"Power & Control" (2012)

Music video
- "Primadonna" on YouTube

"Primadonna" is a song by Welsh singer-songwriter Marina Diamandis, released under the stage name Marina and the Diamonds, from her second studio album, Electra Heart (2012). She wrote the song with Julie Frost, Lukasz "Dr. Luke" Gottwald, and Henry "Cirkut" Walter based on her experience of being called a "prima donna" by her ex-boyfriend. Backed by synthesisers and uptempo beats, the song is about a woman named Electra Heart, a dramatic celebrity looking for adoration. It was released on 20 March 2012 as the album's lead single.

The song peaked at number 11 on the UK Singles Chart in its first week and was Diamandis's highest-charting single in the country at the time. It reached the top five in Austria, Ireland, and New Zealand. Critics generally praised "Primadonna" for its production and exploration of a female archetype, though some found its lack of development exhausting. An accompanying music video, showing Diamandis living a luxurious life in a mansion, was directed by Casper Balslev and released on 12 March 2012 as the fourth part of the Electra Heart video series. Diamandis promoted the song on various television shows and performed it on her headlining tours: The Lonely Hearts Club Tour (2012–2013), Neon Nature Tour (2015–2016), Love + Fear Tour (2019), Ancient Dreams in a Modern Land Tour (2022), and The Princess of Power Tour (2025–2026).

== Background ==
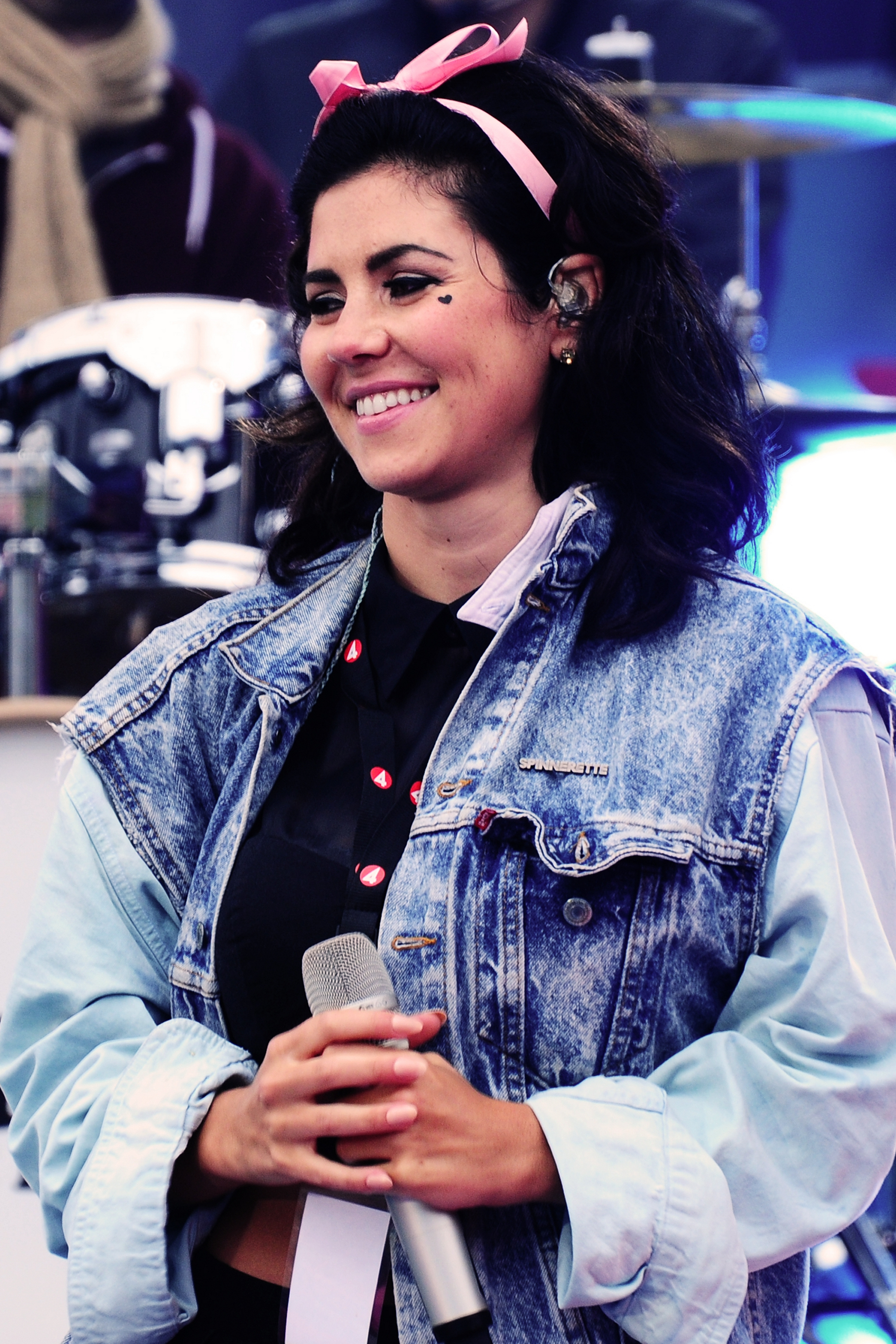
Marina Diamandis in 2012.

Welsh singer-songwriter Marina Diamandis, performing under the stage name Marina and the Diamonds, released her debut album, The Family Jewels, in 2010. After returning from a trip to the United States, she decided to create a persona as the theme for her next album. Diamandis created the character Electra Heart, which embodied four female archetypes: "Primadonna", "Su-Barbie-A", "Teen Idle", and "Homewrecker". In August 2011, Diamandis began the campaign for her second studio album, Electra Heart, by releasing the video for "Fear and Loathing" as the first of a series. She explained the concept of Electra Heart as "the lies, illusions and death of an American Dream". That same month, Diamandis released the promotional single "Radioactive" with its accompanying video as the second instalment of the series. On 10 February 2012, she announced "Primadonna" as the lead single from Electra Heart.

== Writing and production ==
After hearing an instrumental track by songwriter and record producer Lukasz "Dr. Luke" Gottwald, Diamandis decided to collaborate with him, giving the song the title "Primadonna" in July 2011. In October, she began writing the song alongside Dr. Luke, singer-songwriter Julie Frost, and record producer Henry "Cirkut" Walter. The lyrics were based on how Diamandis was called a "prima donna" by her ex-boyfriend, because of the dramatic side she showed him. Though conflicted about the label, she decided to harness the archetype idea into a pop tune. She came up with the idea of being a person who did not need anyone, stating: "When you are with the wrong person, who doesn't really love you, all you want is to be adored. It makes you more inward and needy." Looking to break new ground in her career, Diamandis incorporated elements of camp and displayed a theatricality that she was unable to fully realise on her first album. She described the process of writing a straightforward pop track like "Primadonna" as more challenging than composing other songs.

Dr. Luke and Cirkut produced and programmed the song and provided instrumentation, with Irene Richter and Katie Mitzell coordinating production. "Primadonna" was recorded at Eightysevenfourteen Studios in Los Angeles, California, and was engineered by Clint Gibbs with assistance from Jon Sher; it was mixed at MixStar Studios in Virginia Beach, Virginia, by Serban Ghenea, assisted by Tim Roberts and Phil Seaford. This was the final track to be finished for Electra Heart. Diamandis selected "Primadonna" as the lead single over other tracks because its themes best illustrated her observations of female stereotypes in developing the album's concept, though she believed that the earlier release of "Radioactive" prepared her audience for her new musical direction and prevented her from being restricted to a single genre.

== Music and lyrics ==
Critics categorised "Primadonna" as a dance-pop, electropop, Europop, and disco-pop song with an uptempo rhythm. Martyn Young of MusicOMH commented that the song is characterised by a strong use of synthesisers and heavy beats, which is a stylistic departure for Diamandis. Bradley Stern of MuuMuse likened its production to American singer Britney Spears's Femme Fatale era, particularly "Hold It Against Me" (2011). Robert Copsey of Digital Spy described Diamandis's vocals as "operatic". Sam Lansky of MTV Buzzworthy wrote that her high notes are reminiscent of English singer Kate Bush, and described her tone as "gravelly" when she drops down to a lower register. Critics noted the song's anti-chorus structure, a four-on-the-floor synth drop, and a reverberating beat.

"Primadonna" is a song about dramatic celebrities who seek adoration, with lyrics written in the first person. The track begins with a semi-a cappella opening and an electric organ solo. The song finds Diamandis adopting her Electra Heart alter-ego and embodying the character's superficial persona: "Primadonna girl / All I ever wanted was the world". The sudden burst of synths brings out the song's uptempo beat as Diamandis builds energy in her singing. She describes herself as a "beauty queen of a silver screen" and questions whether a partner would do anything for her, such as buy "a big diamond ring", before declaring that having "a big ego" is "not a big deal". Chants of "yeah" and "oh" occur in the bridge. Diamandis explained that "Primadonna" was about living for adoration and not just romantic love, which according to her, is a common problem among neglected women in relationships. Stern and State's Elizabeth McGeown, respectively, compared the song's lyrical theme to a "gone wild" version of Madonna's "Material Girl" (1984) and Mean Girls-style dialogue.

== Critical reception ==
"Primadonna" generally received positive reviews from music critics. USA Today's Elysa Gardner, The Irish Times's Tony Clayton-Lea, and AllMusic's James Christopher Monger selected the track as a top pick for Electra Heart. Robert Copsey from Digital Spy gave the song four out of five stars, commending Dr. Luke's production, Diamandis's vocals, and its exploration of ego and female archetypes. Ian Sandwell of The Digital Fix and Brendon Veevers of Renowned for Sound similarly praised the song's production and vocal delivery; the latter compared the track to the work of American singer-songwriter Katy Perry. Katherine St Asaph of Popdust rated it 3.5 out of 4 stars, characterising it as a self-aware, ironic take on commercial pop. She wrote that the song works best in Diamandis's lower vocal register, but found her upper range uncomfortable and the chorus lyric "bizarre". Bradley Stern, writing for MuuMuse, praised the track as one of the year's best, particularly its bridges. In 2019, Billboard named it one of the best overlooked pop songs of the 2010s.

MusicOMH critic Helen Clarke called the song an effective pop track influenced by Perry and American singer-songwriter Lady Gaga, although she felt its conventional style and lack of sharp lyricism undermined the album's central concept. Corey Tonkin of Tone Deaf wrote that the song sounded derivative of Madonna. Laura Snapes gave a negative review in Pitchfork, finding its heavy reliance on archetypes and clichés "exhausting". NME's Luke Turner panned the production, described the vocals as "cloying", and dismissed the song as a "giant guff of saccharine nothing" that failed to deliver women's empowerment. Emily Mackay of The Quietus argued that Dr. Luke was not to blame for diluting Diamandis's style, instead finding her alter-ego "paper-thin and paper-cut annoying". Krystina Nellis, reviewing for Drowned in Sound, condemned the chanting as delivered with "all the enthusiasm of a bored Dalstonite".

== Release and commercial performance ==
In a blog post on her website, Diamandis scheduled "Primadonna" for worldwide release on 16 April 2012. In the United States, 679 Records released the song for digital download and streaming on 20 March 2012, and Roadrunner Records issued it to contemporary hit radio on 5 June 2012. An acoustic version was released exclusively for digital download in April 2012.

"Primadonna" debuted at number 11 on the UK Singles Chart with 25,337 copies sold in its first week; it was Diamandis's highest-charting single in the United Kingdom at the time, missing the top 10 by 545 copies. In February 2024, sales and streams of "Primadonna" passed 600,000 units, and the song was certified platinum by the British Phonographic Industry. In its third week on the Irish Singles Chart, "Primadonna" rose to a new peak of number three, becoming Diamandis's highest-charting single in Ireland. The song peaked at number four in New Zealand, her first single to chart in that country. In the United States, "Primadonna" bubbled under the Billboard Pop Songs and Hot Dance Club Songs charts. In 2021, it crossed the one-million-sales mark in the United States and was certified platinum by the Recording Industry Association of America.

== Music video ==
Diamandis, with a small black heart on her cheek, in the music video for "Primadonna"

The music video for "Primadonna" was shot primarily in an old house in Copenhagen, Denmark, for around two to three days. It was directed by Casper Balslev, who previously worked on the videos for "Fear and Loathing" and "Radioactive". The video was produced by Thor Brammer Jacobsen and executive produced by Paul McKee. LOVE and Spoiled Productions handled production, with the latter based in Copenhagen. Both Balslev and Diamandis wanted the video to be "sarcastic" while having an underlying artistic feel.

The video was released on 12 March 2012 as the fourth part of the Electra Heart series. Two days earlier, Diamandis released a fifteen-second preview. The video shows Diamandis living an extravagant, unusual life in and around a jewel-toned mansion. Wearing bold retro outfits with a black heart painted on her cheek, the singer lounges in fancy rooms, works out, and roams the grounds. The scenes are spliced with close-ups of Diamandis displayed on stylised CRT monitors. Towards the end, a black-and-white shot shows her sitting in the back seat of a vehicle passing through the city at night, before the vehicle enters a car wash.

== Live performances and other uses ==
Diamandis released a video of her acoustic performance of "Primadonna" on 19 March 2012. She performed the song live on shows such as In:Demand, BBC Radio 1's Live Lounge, BBC One's The Graham Norton Show, RTÉ One's The Late Late Show, ABC's Jimmy Kimmel Live!, and the sixth season finale of the Danish X Factor. "Primadonna" was included on the setlists of her headlining tours: The Lonely Hearts Club Tour (2012–2013), Neon Nature Tour (2015–2016), Love + Fear Tour (2019), Ancient Dreams in a Modern Land Tour (2022), and The Princess of Power Tour (2025–2026).

Production team Octopus remixed the song by replacing synthesisers with disco blips and released it on 4 May 2012. On 18 June, entertainment company Peace Bisquit posted a video on blogger Perez Hilton's website featuring internet personalities Cazwell, Amanda Lepore, and Roxy Cottontail lip-syncing to "Primadonna". On 2 April 2013, the song became available in the rhythm game Just Dance 4 (2012). "Primadonna" inspired American singer-songwriter Billie Eilish, who discovered Diamandis after hearing the song in a make-up tutorial video.

== Track listings ==
- US digital download
1. "Primadonna" – 3:41
- UK CD single
1. "Primadonna" – 3:41
2. "Primadonna" (Kat Krazy Remix) – 3:39
3. "Primadonna" (Walden Remix) – 6:21
4. "Primadonna" (Burns Remix) – 4:29
- UK digital download (EP remixes)
1. "Primadonna" – 3:41
2. "Primadonna" (Benny Benassi Remix) – 7:05
3. "Primadonna" (Riva Starr Remix) – 5:45
4. "Primadonna" (Burns Remix) – 4:29
5. "Primadonna" (Evian Christ Remix) – 3:44
- UK digital download (EP acoustic)
1. "Primadonna" (Acoustic) – 3:55
2. "Starring Role" (Acoustic) – 3:58
3. "Lies" (Acoustic) – 4:08
- US digital download (EP remixes)
1. "Primadonna" (Walden Remix) – 6:20
2. "Primadonna" (Benny Benassi Remix) – 7:05
3. "Primadonna" (Kat Krazy Remix) – 4:52
4. "Primadonna" (Burns Remix) – 4:29
5. "Primadonna" (Evian Christ Remix) – 3:44
6. "Primadonna" (Riva Starr Remix) – 5:45
7. "Primadonna" (Until the Ribbon Breaks Remix) – 3:47
- US digital download (2-track remixes)
1. "Primadonna" (Ludovika Remix) – 6:00
2. "Primadonna" (Bobby Rock Remix) – 5:31
- German 2-track CD single
1. "Primadonna" – 3:41
2. "Primadonna" (Benny Benassi Remix) – 7:05

== Credits and personnel ==
=== Song ===
Adapted from the liner notes of Electra Heart.

==== Locations ====
- Recorded at Eightysevenfourteen Studios (Los Angeles, California)
- Mixed at MixStar Studios (Virginia Beach, Virginia)

==== Credits ====
- Marina Diamandis – vocals, songwriter
- Julie Frost – songwriter
- Lukasz Gottwald – songwriter, producer, instruments, programming
- Henry Walter – songwriter, producer, instruments, programming
- Clint Gibbs – engineering
- Jon Sher – engineering assistant
- Irene Richter – production coordination
- Katie Mitzell – production coordination
- Serban Ghenea – mixer
- John Hanes – mix engineer
- Tim Roberts – assistant mix engineer
- Phil Seaford – assistant mix engineer

=== Music video ===
Adapted from Balslev's website.

- Casper Balslev – director
- LOVE – production company
- Spoiled Productions – Copenhagen production
- Paul McKee – executive producer
- Thor Brammer Jacobsen – producer
- Mikkel DamKiær – line producer
- Cathrine Bjørn – production manager
- Sebastian Wintherø – director of photography
- Jake Wynne – editor
- George K, MPC – colourist
- Rasmus With – art director
- Celestine Cooney – stylist
- Darren Evans – hair stylist
- Niamh Quinn – make-up artist
- Madeleine Ostlie – additional styling
- Alan Parks – commissioner

== Charts ==
=== Weekly charts ===
Weekly chart performance for "Primadonna"
Chart (2012)	Peak position
Australia (ARIA)	21
Austria (Ö3 Austria Top 40)	3
CIS Airplay (TopHit)	21
Denmark (Tracklisten)	12
Euro Digital Song Sales (Billboard)	12
Germany (GfK)	18
Hungary (Rádiós Top 40)	14
Ireland (IRMA)	3
Netherlands (Single Top 100)	95
New Zealand (Recorded Music NZ)	4
Romania (Airplay 100)	89
Russia Airplay (TopHit)	17
Scottish Singles Sales (Official Charts)	9
Slovakia Airplay (ČNS IFPI)	10
Switzerland (Schweizer Hitparade)	16
UK Singles (Official Charts)	11

=== Monthly charts ===
Monthly chart performance for "Primadonna"
Chart (2012)	Peak position
CIS Airplay (TopHit)	24
Russia Airplay (TopHit)	21

=== Year-end charts ===
Year-end chart performance for "Primadonna"
Chart (2012)	Position
Austria (Ö3 Austria Top 40)	36
CIS Airplay (TopHit)	72
Hungary (Rádiós Top 40)	32
Ireland (IRMA)	20
New Zealand (Recorded Music NZ)	43
Russia Airplay (TopHit)	70
UK Singles (OCC)	113

== Certifications ==
Certifications for "Primadonna"
Region	Certification	Certified units/sales
Australia (ARIA)	Platinum	70,000^{^}
Austria (IFPI Austria)	Gold	15,000^{*}
Denmark (IFPI Danmark)	Platinum	30,000^{^}
Germany (BVMI)	Gold	300,000^{‡}
New Zealand (RMNZ)	2× Platinum	60,000^{‡}
United Kingdom (BPI)	Platinum	600,000^{‡}
United States (RIAA)	Platinum	1,000,000^{‡}
Streaming
Denmark (IFPI Danmark)	Platinum	1,800,000^{†}
^{*} Sales figures based on certification alone.^{^} Shipments figures based on certification alone.^{‡} Sales+streaming figures based on certification alone.^{†} Streaming-only figures based on certification alone.

== Release history ==
Release dates and formats for "Primadonna"
Region	Date	Format(s)	Label(s)	Ref.
United States	20 March 2012	Digital download; streaming	679	
Various	16 April 2012	Digital download; streaming	679	
Italy	4 May 2012	Radio airplay	Warner	
United States	5 June 2012	Contemporary hit radio	Roadrunner	
