= The Late Late Show season 50 =

The 50th season of The Late Late Show, the world's longest-running chat show, began on 2 September 2011, and concluded on 1 June 2012. Ryan Tubridy's third season as host, it aired on RTÉ One each Friday evening from 21:30.

Local guests this season included Bob Geldof, Senator David Norris, President Michael D. Higgins, Joanne O'Riordan and Micheál Martin. Ireland football players Shay Given, Paul McGrath, Niall Quinn and Ronnie Whelan all featured in different episodes (as did England football player Steven Gerrard), while other guests from the world of sport this season included Kieran Behan, Conor Niland, Pat Spillane, Katie Taylor and Johnston, Mooney and O'Brien.

International guests interviewed this season included Terry Pratchett, Tippi Hedren, Santa Claus and Mia Farrow. Sinéad O'Connor managed three appearances, including the first and last episodes of the season, while in November Westlife gave their first interview since announcing their demise. Julian Lennon and James McCartney appeared in separate episodes (in September and in March). Academy Award winners Glen Hansard and Cuba Gooding Jr. were interviewed in separate episodes. Other musical guests this season included Aslan, Snow Patrol, One Direction, JLS, The Wanted, Ed Sheeran, Ryan O'Shaughnessy, Foster and Allen, Florence and the Machine, James Morrison, Maverick Sabre, Michael Bublé, Noel Gallagher, Lisa Hannigan and Eleanor McEvoy.

The first televised debate of the presidential election campaign was held during the fifth episode. The final episode of the season celebrated the 50th anniversary of The Late Late Show, which fell the following month.

== Sinéad O'Connor incident ==
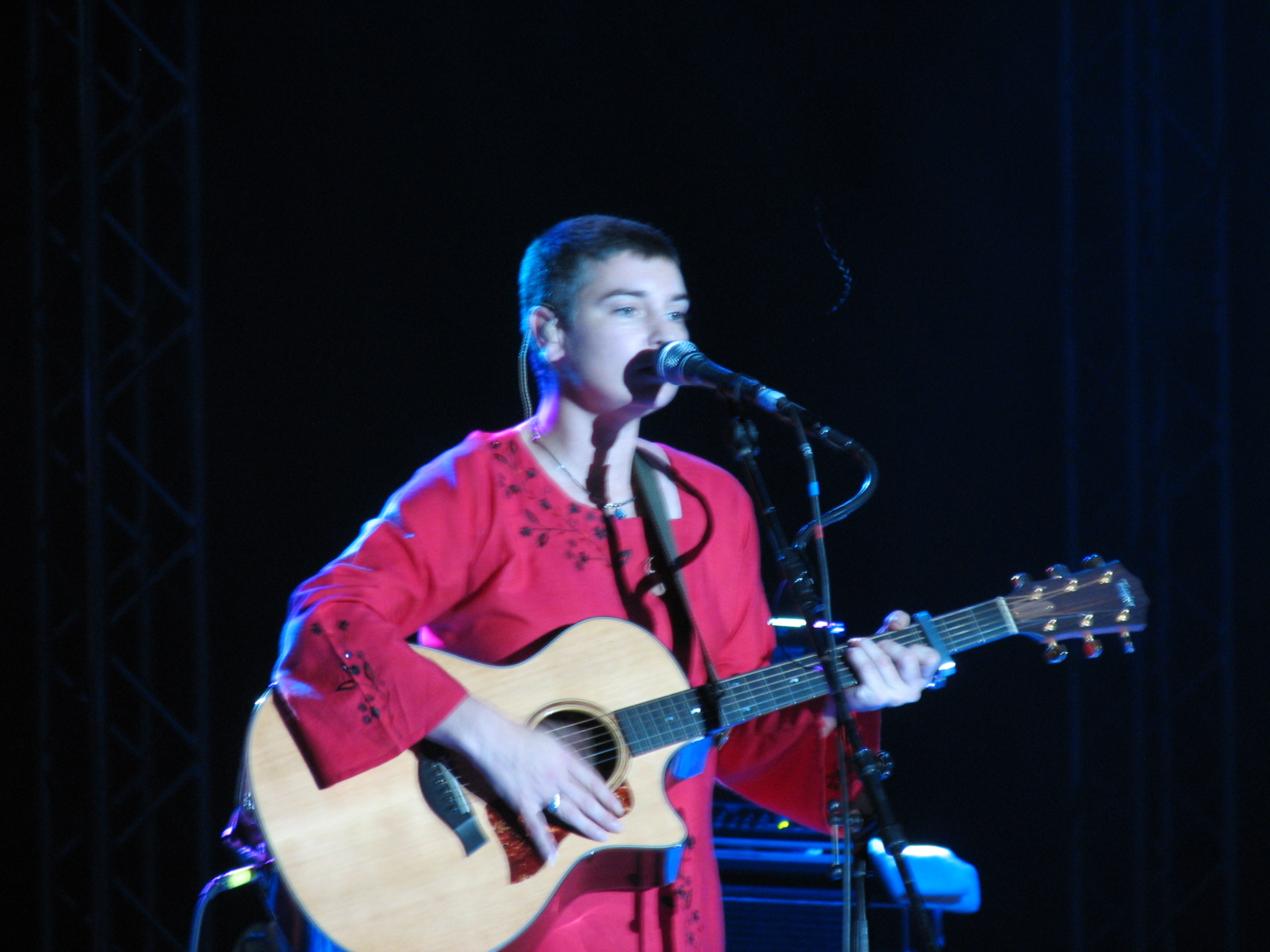
Sinéad O'Connor

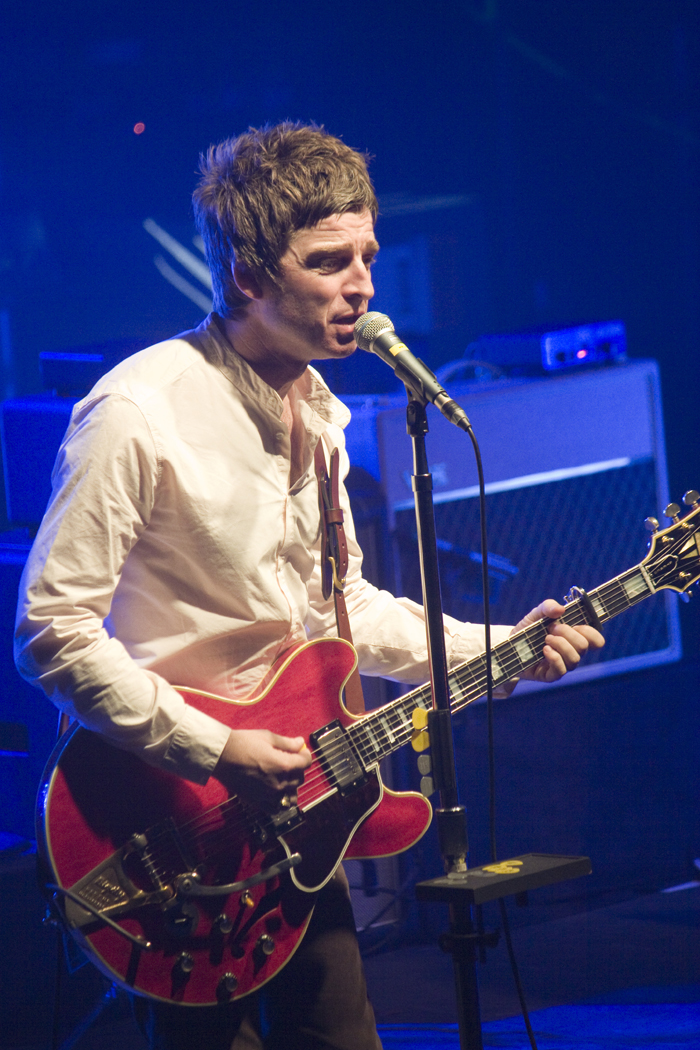
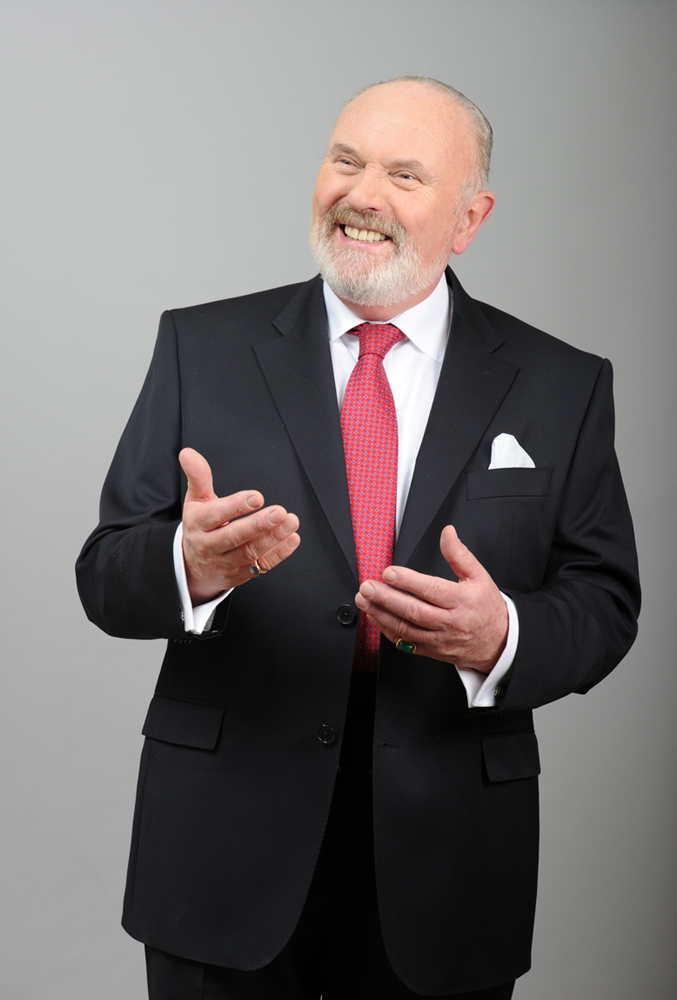
Noel Gallagher (left) and David Norris (right)

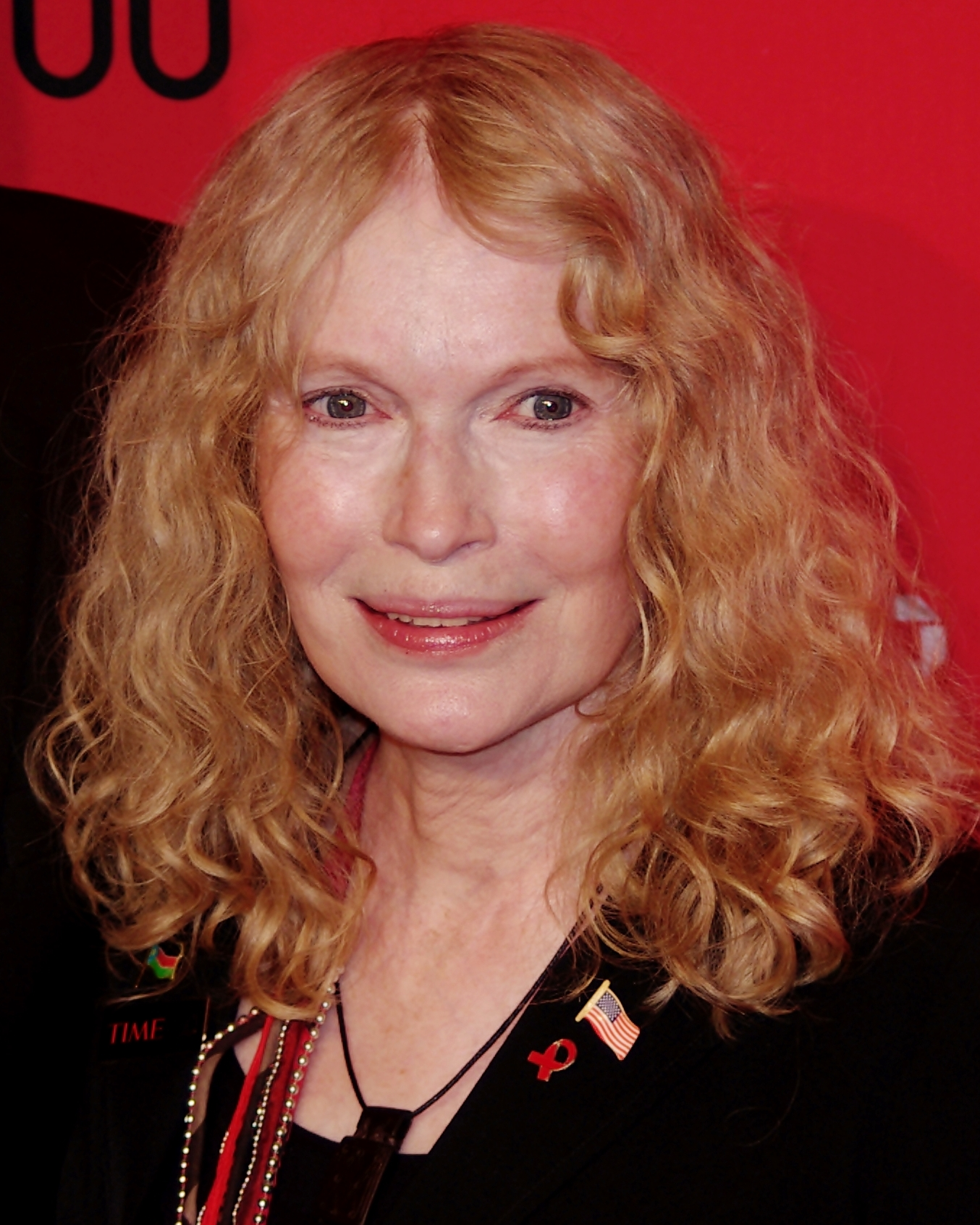
Mia Farrow

Musician Sinéad O'Connor was invited onto The Late Late Show to discuss her hunt for a man. She pulled out of her appearance on the opening episode of the season. She later changed her mind and appeared on the episode after a personal chat with host Ryan Tubridy on the phone convinced her she would not be portrayed as a "crazy performing monkey".

== Fifth episode ==
The second debate between the candidates contesting the 2011 presidential election was held on The Late Late Show on 30 September 2011; David Norris was not interviewed alone as the other six candidates were as he had been interviewed the previous week on the programme, but was included in the later panel debate.

== Twentieth episode ==
Síle Seoige made headlines when Tubridy interviewed personalities Lorraine Keane, Andrea Roche and Michael O'Leary on 20 January 2012 by tweeting: "Just wondering ... are the days of the likes of Peter Ustinov, Spike Milligan and Germaine Greer gone forever?" Ray D'Arcy supported Seoige's assertion that The Late Late Show had considerably deteriorated in its quality, going as far as to say it would put him off the idea of ever hosting a chat show on RTÉ. The Evening Herald later reported that Tubridy dismissed her as "that small thing".

== Twenty-fourth episode ==
On 17 February 2012, Noel Gallagher appeared on The Late Late Show. He spoke of playing Gaelic football at Croke Park and was presented with a signed Dublin jersey. "I used to play Gaelic Football - not professionally of course - with a team from Manchester. We were under-14, 16 and 18 champions consecutively" (When Tubridy asked him where he played) "What position? I've no idea. I can't remember. But we were called Oisíns - whatever that means I don't know - and we came to Dublin to play exhibition matches against some Dublin teams in Croke Park. We were hammered, but there is a photograph of me scoring a point in Croke Park. I haven't got the photograph but there is a photograph in existence."

== Twenty-eight episode ==
On 16 March 2012, Tubridy probed the personal life of Mia Farrow on The Late Late Show. Farrow later described him as "not very gracious".

== Thirty-third episode ==
On 20 April 2012, Tubridy interviewed Jenny McDonald, Ruth Bowie and Arlette Lyons, women who aborted their babies.

== Special editions ==
The season's edition of The Late Late Toy Show was broadcast on 2 December 2011. It was the most watched show in 17 years and of 2011, with A National Address By An Taoiseach Enda Kenny, TD in second place and the Eurovision Song Contest in third place. Tubridy later admitted that he had to apologise to a lady in the audience whom he had hit with a soiled nappy tossed carelessly aside during one of the toy demonstrations.

The 2012 Eurosong Final was held on The Late Late Show on 24 February. Five acts performed, with one selected to represent Ireland at Eurovision Song Contest 2011 in Baku. They included previous Eurovision entrants Jedward and Donna McCaul. Selected were Jedward with their song "Waterline".

The final episode of the season, broadcast on 1 June 2012, was a 50th anniversary special. Guests included past presenters Gay Byrne, Pat Kenny, as well as Dustin the Turkey, Nell McCafferty, Liam Neeson, Sinéad O'Connor, Tommy Tiernan, Bono and Imelda May.

== Episode list ==
No.	Original release date	Guest(s)	Musical/entertainment guest(s)
1	2 September 2011	Conor Niland	Eleanor McEvoy
2	9 September 2011	Ronnie Whelan	N/A
3	16 September 2011	Paddy Doherty	The Saturdays
4	23 September 2011	Dublin senior football team	Joe McElderry
5	30 September 2011	Mike Murphy	Jedward
First televised debate of the presidential election campaign
6	7 October 2011	Dermot Bannon	Caro Emerald
7	14 October 2011	Cecelia Ahern	Tim Michin
8	21 October 2011	Danielle Ryan, Saoirse Ronan and Charlene McKenna	Ed Sheeran
9	28 October 2011	Katie Taylor	Florence and the Machine
10	4 November 2011	Westlife	Westlife
Westlife's first interview since announcing their demise
11	11 November 2011	PJ Gallagher and Dara Ó Briain	The Wanted
12	18 November 2011	Michael Bublé	Some of those interviewed?
13	25 November 2011	One Direction	One Direction
14	2 December 2011	Various children	TBA
The Late Late Toy Show
15	9 December 2011	Sinitta	Daniel O'Donnell
16	16 December 2011	The Rubberbandits	Charlotte Church
17	23 December 2011	Allen Leech	Ryan Sheridan
18	6 January 2012	TBA	TBA
19	13 January 2012	Keith and Jay Duffy	N/A
20	20 January 2012	Michael O'Leary	N/A
21	27 January 2012	Eamon Dunphy	Ashley Tubridy
22	3 February 2012	Corey Feldman	Bressie
23	10 February 2012	Michelle Heaton	Matt Cardle
24	17 February 2012	Noel Gallagher	Snow Patrol
25	24 February 2012	TBA	Jedward
Eurosong special
26	2 March 2012	Niall Quinn	Big Country
27	9 March 2012	Susan Boyle	The Wanted and trad group the Irish House Party perform "Glad You Came" together
28	16 March 2012	Mia Farrow	Sinéad O'Connor
29	23 March 2012	Natasha Giggs	N/A
Giggs's first Irish television interview since the affair
30	30 March 2012	Johnston, Mooney and O'Brien	Katie Melua
31	6 April 2012	Diarmuid Gavin	Keith Barry
32	13 April 2012	Bob Geldof	N/A
33	20 April 2012	Jonathan Ross	N/A
Ross's first appearance on the show; McGrath's first appearance in 15 years
34	27 April 2012	Steven Gerrard	Marina and the Diamonds
35	4 May 2012	Terry Pratchett RIP	Pat Byrne with Bressie
36	11 May 2012	Jedward	Some of those interviewed?
37	18 May 2012	Ryan O'Shaughnessy	Ryan O'Shaughnessy
38	25 May 2012	President Michael D. Higgins	Glen Hansard
39	1 June 2012	Gay Byrne	Sinéad O'Connor
50th Anniversary Special
