= Electra Heart =

- Standard edition cover (Note: Editions of the album outside North America have a more close-up picture of Diamandis with lighter colours. The deluxe edition cover features the picture in greyscale and the album's title and her name written in lilac text.)

Studio album by Marina and the Diamonds
- Released: 27 April 2012
- Recorded: 2010–2012
- Studios: Green Building (Santa Monica, California) (Note: Tracks 1, 4, 6, 10 and 11); Hackney Downs (Hackney, London); Eightysevenfourteen (Los Angeles) (Note: Tracks 2 and 3); The Village (Los Angeles) (Note: Engineering on tracks 6 and 10); The Ivory Tower (Note: Tracks 9, 12 and 16); Roc the Mic (New York City) (Note: Track 13); Dirty Dutch (Amsterdam); Captain Cuts (Los Angeles) (Note: Track 15); Blast Off (New York City)
- Genres: Pop; electropop; dance-pop
- Length: 46:51
- Labels: 679; Atlantic
- Producers: Benny Blanco; Captain Cuts; DJ Chuckie; Cirkut; Diplo; Dr. Luke; The Elite; Liam Howe; Devrim Karaoğlu; Greg Kurstin; Fabian Lenssen; Rick Nowels; Dean Reid; Stargate

Marina and the Diamonds chronology
The Family Jewels (2010)	Electra Heart (2012)	Froot (2015)

Singles from Electra Heart
- 1. "Primadonna" Released: 20 March 2012; 2. "Power & Control" Released: 20 July 2012; 3. "How to Be a Heartbreaker" Released: 7 December 2012

Electra Heart is the second studio album by Welsh singer-songwriter Marina Diamandis, released under the stage name Marina and the Diamonds. It was released on 27 April 2012 by 679 Artists and Atlantic Records. Diamandis collaborated with producers including Liam Howe, Greg Kurstin, Dr. Luke, Diplo and Stargate during its recording, and subsequently transitioned from the new wave musical styles seen throughout her debut studio album, The Family Jewels (2010). Their efforts resulted in a concept album consisting of electropop and dance-pop music, a distinct departure from her earlier projects. Lyrically, the album discusses topics of love and identity. Diamandis created the title character "Electra Heart" to represent female archetypes in popular American culture (House Wife, Beauty Queen, Homewrecker, and Idle Teen).

Music critics were divided in their opinions of Electra Heart, expressing ambivalence towards Diamandis' shift in musical style and its overall production. However, the album retrospectively earned the status of a cult classic, with Rolling Stone listing it among the 50 greatest concept albums of all time. The album debuted at number one on the UK Albums Chart with first-week sales of 21,358 copies. In doing so, it earned Diamandis her first chart-topping album there. The album was eventually certified gold by the British Phonographic Industry (BPI) for exceeding shipments of 100,000 units. Electra Heart performed moderately on international charts, including a peak position of number 31 on the US Billboard 200, and became Diamandis' highest-charting album in the United States at the time selling an estimated 11,000 copies. The album was eventually certified gold by the Recording Industry Association of America (RIAA) for exceeding shipments of 500,000 units.

Electra Heart was supported by three singles, all of which were supplemented by music videos. "Primadonna" was released as the lead single from the album on 20 March 2012, and peaked at number 11 on the UK Singles Chart. Follow-up singles "Power & Control" and "How to Be a Heartbreaker" were respectively released on 20 July and 7 December, and reached numbers 193 and 88 in the United Kingdom. Promotional single "Radioactive" charted inside the top 40 in several countries. The album was additionally promoted by Diamandis' headlining the Lonely Hearts Club Tour, which visited Europe and North America from May 2012 through May 2013.

== Background and production ==
"Electra Heart is the antithesis of everything that I stand for. And the point of introducing her and building a whole concept around her is that she stands for the corrupt side of American ideology, and basically that's the corruption of yourself. My worst fear—that's anyone's worst fear—is losing myself and becoming a vacuous person. And that happens a lot when you're very ambitious."

— Diamandis, describing the concepts for Electra Heart and its title character.

After returning from the United States after the launch of her debut studio album The Family Jewels (2010), Diamandis considered creating a character which would become the centerpiece of her follow-up project. She commented that she was inspired by the "Tumblr generation" to photograph herself in several places across the United States, appearing as a different persona in each picture to mimick the anonymity of the "mini-stars of the internet". The final product became "a cold, ruthless character who wasn't vulnerable", which she later named "Electra Heart" and detailed as a tool to represent a combination of elements associated with the American Dream and Greek tragedy, and added that visuals would merge the differing concepts into a cohesive idea.

Diamandis first announced Electra Heart in August 2011; it was initially planned to become a three-piece project inspired by American culture in the 1970s, although it eventually evolved into her second studio album. Diamandis originally planned to release the record as a "side project" under an entity separate from Marina and the Diamonds, although her management disapproved. The track "Living Dead" was the first recorded during its production, and approximately 22 songs were recorded for potential inclusion on the album.

She later commented that the record was dedicated to "dysfunctional love", elaborating that "rejection is a universally embarrassing topic and Electra Heart is my response to that." Diamandis stated that Electra Heart was influenced by Madonna, Marilyn Monroe, and Queen of France Marie Antoinette; she described Madonna as being "fearless" and felt that she showcased a desire to be a successful artist beyond fame and wealth. Diamandis told Glamour that Britney Spears influenced a "double-sided" theme for the record of both "innocence" and "darkness". She described the final product as being "a bit cringe" and reflective of her personal experiences, although noted that its promotional campaign would be "pink and fluffy".

== Composition ==
"Primadonna"
A sample of "Primadonna", a "surging" pop recording that incorporates an "anti-chorus structure"; the track received comparisons to the catalogues of Lykke Li and Coldplay.

"Power & Control"
A sample of "Power & Control", which incorporates prominent elements of electropop. Steve Angello from the electronic dance music group Swedish House Mafia co-wrote the song.

Electra Heart is a pop, electropop, and dance-pop record with inflections of new wave, pop-punk, dubstep, rock, and Italo disco. It has been described as a concept album detailing "female identity" and "a recent breakup". It represents a musical departure from Diamandis' debut studio album The Family Jewels (2010), which incorporated a new wave and indie rock-influenced sonority. She later commented that the album was specifically designed as a pop record to allow her to establish a greater prominence in the contemporary music industry. The title character "Electra Heart" portrays four female archetypes in the album: "Teen Idle", "Primadonna", "Homewrecker", and "Su-Barbie-A". Their presences on each track are not clearly defined, although Diamandis acknowledged that they are more apparent on the visual aspects of the album.

Alexis Petridis from The Guardian compared the lyrical content used throughout the pop punk-inspired opener "Bubblegum Bitch" to "the self-fulfilling I-will-be-huge prophecy" that was developed in The Fame by Lady Gaga. The following track "Primadonna" is a pop number that contains a "surging beat" and an "anti-chorus structure", which according to James Christopher Monger from AllMusic blends styles reminiscent of Swedish singer Lykke Li and the British band Coldplay.

"Lies" is an electro ballad, which Michael Cragg from BBC Music felt that allowed Diamandis to "deal directly with her emotions", and opined that contributions from producer Diplo gave the song "extra gloom wobble sadness". Cragg classified "Homewrecker" as a "vampy" track which blends verses centred around spoken-word vocals with a "stompy" refrain where Diamandis declares "I broke a million hearts just for fun". Cragg further opined that "Starring Role" was "heart-rending in its simplicity", and noticed prominent piano and drum instrumentation throughout the recording.

Monger saw the sixth track "The State of Dreaming" as a solemn offering from the record for its intellectual lyrical content, which he described as one of several tracks that "reveal the lonely rebel, defiantly eating lunch alone, secretly wishing for acceptance." "Power & Control" was detailed as an electropop track by Emily Mackay from The Quietus, while Laura Snapes from Pitchfork commented that Diamandis repeatedly delivers the lyrics "I am weak" with an "increasingly ephemeral voice" as it progresses. Snapes also felt that "Living Dead" was a more "vulnerable moment" from Electra Heart, and compared it to the "snappy [and] taut" works of English duo Soft Cell.

Monger recognised inspiration from American singer Lana Del Rey in "Teen Idle" and felt that it represented "the feral blood of an army of disenfranchised high-school loners coming into their own". Bradley Stern from MuuMuse suggested that "Valley of the Dolls" drew inspiration from the 1967 film of the same name, and described "Hypocrates" as a "sparkling guitar-pop tune" that takes stylistic influences from 1960s pop music and details the power struggle between romantic partners. Electra Heart closes with its 12th track "Fear and Loathing", which experiments with electronic music styles; Petridis made particular note of its minimal production, which according to him, places emphasis on Diamandis' "coolly enunciated and slightly folky" vocals.

== Release and promotion ==
On 1 March, Diamandis unveiled the album artwork for the standard version of Electra Heart, which depicts a blonde Diamandis wearing several hair rollers. The singer later revealed that because of the dye, her hair started to fall out, so she got a boy's haircut and wore a wig. Becky Bain from Idolator complimented its "retro film stock look" and opined that it "is just a snapshot from some 1970s exploitation movie", while Bradley Stern from MuuMuse jokingly referenced the album track "Homewrecker" when stating that she "looks like a proper Suzy Homemaker! (Or should I say Suzy Homewrecker?)" The artwork for the deluxe version features the same picture of Diamandis, although it is tinted purple. The track listing for the standard version was confirmed on 1 March, while the track listing for the deluxe version was announced on 5 March. A limited edition box set of Electra Heart contained the deluxe version of the record, four photo art cards, a ring, perspex, necklace, and pocket mirror.

=== Music videos ===
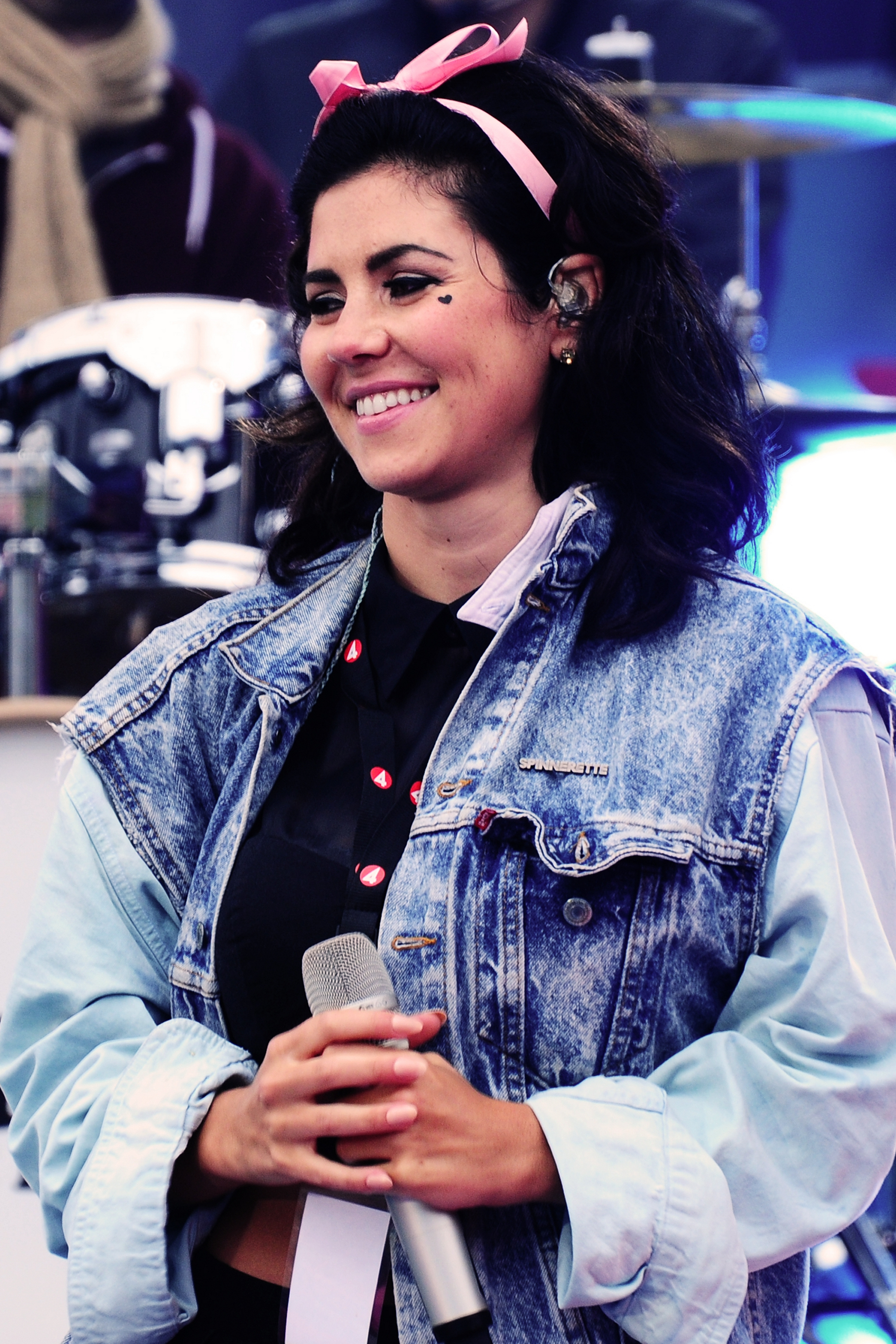
Diamandis on Sommarkrysset in Sweden, September 2012.

Diamandis released 11 music videos through YouTube during the promotional campaign for Electra Heart. She claimed that their production led her record label into bankruptcy, but stated that they would be released and "finish this era the way I want to." The first, titled "Part 1: Fear and Loathing", was released on 8 August 2011, and sees Diamandis cutting her long brown hair and singing the track on a balcony during the nighttime. It was followed by "Part 2: Radioactive" on 22 August, which depicts a blonde-wigged Diamandis travelling across the United States with her romantic interest.

The track was released through the iTunes Store on 23 September, and peaked at number 25 on the UK Singles Chart on 15 October. The black-and-white clip "Part 3: The Archetypes" shows the close-up of a blonde Diamandis while the introduction of "The State of Dreaming" is played; it introduced the archetypes "housewife", "beauty queen", "homewrecker", and "idle teen" on 15 December. "Part 4: Primadonna" served as the music video for the lead single from the record on 12 March 2012.

Uploaded on 18 May, the black-and-white "Part 5: Su-Barbie-A" is set to the introduction of "Valley of the Dolls" with overlapped commentary mentioning "Quick-Curl Barbie" and "Mod-Hair Ken"; it depicts Diamandis standing on the porch of a house with her back to the front door. It was followed by "Part 6: Power & Control" on 30 May, where Diamandis is seen engaging in a series of mind games with her romantic interest. Diamandis alleged that Atlantic Records delayed the premiere of "Part 7: How to Be a Heartbreaker" because they felt she was "ugly" in the clip; it was made publicly available on 28 September, and sees Diamandis interacting with several shirtless men in a community shower. "Part 8: E.V.O.L." introduced the previously unreleased track "E.V.O.L" on 14 February 2013. The black-and-white visual shows a brown-wigged Diamandis looking about a room with white-tiled walls.

"Part 9: The State of Dreaming", premiered on 2 March, presents Diamandis lying on a bed while "alternating between sad eyes and a big smile". It begins with a black-and-white filter, although transitions into color after the first minute. It was followed by "Part 10: Lies" on 17 July, and employs a similar black-and-white to color technique. Diamandis is first seen looking into the camera wearing little makeup, and is later shown walking into the woods and sitting at a dinner table in the rain. The final music video "Part 11: Electra Heart" introduced the previously unreleased title track; the clip itself contains footage from the earlier music videos. It symbolically ended the promotional era for Electra Heart, with Diamandis having tweeted "Goodbye, Electra Heart!" on 8 August, the same day the video was released.

=== Singles ===
Inspired by the six-single promotional campaign for Katy Perry's Teenage Dream (2010), Diamandis planned to release six singles from Electra Heart; however, three tracks were released before she finished promoting the album. "Primadonna" was announced as the lead single from the record on 13 March 2012, and was released through the iTunes Store in the United States on 20 March. Robert Copsey from Digital Spy spoke favourably of the track, complimenting its overall production and Diamandis' portrayal of its female archetype. It peaked at number 11 on the UK Singles Chart, becoming Diamandis' fifth song to enter the top 40 in the United Kingdom.

"Power & Control" was released through the iTunes Store in the United Kingdom on 20 July 2012 and served as the second single from Electra Heart. It peaked at number 193 on the UK Singles Chart. In July 2012, it was announced that "How to Be a Heartbreaker" would be released as the second single in the United States and the third single in the United Kingdom. Diamandis commented that she had written the track while Electra Heart was being pressed in the United Kingdom, and consequently missed the cut-off for initial inclusion on the record; however, it was featured in the revised track listing for the American version. The song was released through the iTunes Store on 7 December 2012, and peaked at number 88 on the UK Singles Chart.

=== Tour ===
In February 2012, Diamandis announced the launch of her headlining the Lonely Hearts Club Tour. It ran alongside the Mylo Xyloto Tour headlined by Coldplay, for which Diamandis served as the supporting act. The Lonely Hearts Club Tour was initially scheduled to begin on 4 May at the Manchester Cathedral in Manchester, although it was delayed after Diamandis sustained a vocal cord injury, and ultimately began on 18 June at the Waterfront in Norwich. The American leg of the tour began on 10 July at the Fonda Theatre in Los Angeles, while the tour itself ended on 29 May 2013 after a performance at the Rumsey Playfield in New York City.

== Critical reception ==
Professional ratings
Aggregate scores
Source	Rating
AnyDecentMusic?	5.5/10
Metacritic	57/100
Review scores
Source	Rating
AllMusic	4/5 stars
Clash	1/10
Drowned in Sound	5/10
Entertainment Weekly	B+
The Guardian	3/5 stars
The Independent	3/5 stars
MusicOMH	3/5 stars
NME	5/10
The Observer	3/5 stars
Pitchfork	5.9/10

Electra Heart received mixed reviews from music critics. At Metacritic, which assigns a normalised rating out of 100 to reviews from mainstream publications, the album received an average score of 57, based on 16 reviews.

Writing for AllMusic, James Christopher Monger compared the record to the works of American singers Kesha and Lady Gaga, and favourably summarised it as "a brooding, sexy, desperate, overwrought, and infectious record that's both aware and unashamed of its contrivance." Michael Cragg of BBC Music felt that the recurring concept of failed romance established "a strange dichotomy" that created a sense of cohesiveness, and elaborated that it "[pulls] you sharply into her world." He considered the second half of the disc to be mildly disappointing, although concluded that this was excusable because the overall record "[balances] the ironic and the heartfelt, the quirky and the mainstream, the real and the fake with remarkable aplomb." Tim Stack of Entertainment Weekly complimented Diamandis for her ability to "rival Katy Perry for catchy hooks, command with the swagger of Gwen Stefani, and even come close to the ethereal vocal exhilaration of Florence Welch." Stack opined that Electra Heart was a healthy combination of up-tempo recordings and genuinely-delivered ballads, and placed additional praise on the female archetypes explored throughout the album.

The Guardian writer Alexis Petridis was confident that "there's clearly an interesting pop star" emerging from Diamandis, but suggested that her creativity was restricted by the heavy integration of alter egos and an implied determination for commercial success, which he commented failed to reflect Diamandis' inventiveness. Simon Price from The Independent accepted that the record was "too professional to be truly terrible", although noted that Diamandis' revamped public image as a "British Katy Perry" lacked ingenuity. NME columnist Priya Elan summarised the album as an "expensive-sounding failure" that suffered from its lack of decisiveness. Writing for Pitchfork, Laura Snapes questioned the decision of creating the "Electra Heart" character for the record, and suggested that it was unnecessary. She elaborated that "duller and more unbearable" tracks were unavoidable, and expressed particular disappointment because she thought that Electra Heart could have become "one of the year's most acclaimed pop albums." Representing The Observer, Kitty Empire assumed that Diamandis' collaborations with Dr. Luke and Greg Kurstin were evidence of "a big label push". She compared the disc to the works of Perry and Britney Spears, although felt that Lana Del Rey was more successful in embodying the themes of "love, identity, femininity and America" than Diamandis' generic production values allowed. Emily Mackay from The Quietus criticised the songs' titles for being lacklustre, which she sarcastically stated caused listeners "physical pain", and was disappointed that the character "Electra Heart" was a scapegoat for expressing "all the worst parts of Marina Diamandis that she didn't want to become."

A decade after their original review, Clash reflected on their original scoring of 1/10 as "particularly unpleasant – cruel, rude, and actually pretty offensive. Yuck". In a reassessment of the album, they concluded that "her [Marina's] forward-thinking music, ten years on, still sounds as fresh and exciting as it did in 2012". Rolling Stone magazine listed it among the 50 Greatest Concept Albums of All Time.

== Commercial performance ==
"It's been so instant that I've come over [in the United States] and sold out my tour and I've never really done that before. People are getting the humour. It's such a relief to be here for six weeks because it feels effortless. When I first changed [musical direction] people said, 'She's sold out' and they totally didn't get the humour. It's a tongue-in-cheek record but it also deals with the truth about love and commercialism and just being a young person, really."

— Diamandis describing the differing reactions to Electra Heart in the United Kingdom and the United States.

Electra Heart debuted at number one on the UK Albums Chart with first-week sales of 21,358 copies. It became Diamandis' first chart-topping album in the United Kingdom, although it was additionally distinguished as the lowest-selling number-one record of the 21st century in the country. It was later surpassed by Write It on Your Skin by Newton Faulkner, which debuted at number one on the UK Albums Chart with first-week sales of 16,647 copies three months later. On 15 April 2016, Electra Heart was certified gold by the British Phonographic Industry for exceeding shipments of 100,000 units in the United Kingdom. The record additionally reached number one on both the Irish Albums Chart and the Scottish Albums Chart; it was recognised with a gold certification in the former territory by the Irish Recorded Music Association (IRMA). Despite these chart performances, Diamandis has suggested that the high-budget release of Electra Heart might have led to the demise of 679 Artists, her record label at the time.

Electra Heart performed moderately on additional record charts in Europe. The record peaked at number 11 on the Swiss Hitparade, and reached number 17 on the German Media Control Charts. It charted at number 25 on the Ö3 Austria Top 40, number 30 on the Norwegian VG-lista, and number 41 on the Swedish Sverigetopplistan. The album reached the lower ends of the Dutch MegaCharts and the Belgian Ultratop in Wallonia, respectively peaking at numbers 92 and 132 in each region. However, it reached number 31 on the Official New Zealand Music Chart and number 32 on the Australian ARIA Albums Chart in Oceania.

Electra Heart debuted at number 31 on the US Billboard 200, and reached number two on the Billboard Dance/Electronic Albums component chart. It had sold 150,000 copies in the United States as of May 2015. On 13 April 2019, the album was certified gold by the Recording Industry Association of America (RIAA), denoting shipments in excess of 500,000 units in the United States. Elsewhere in North America, the record peaked at number 50 on the Canadian Albums Chart. In August 2012, Diamandis commented that she believed consumers in the United Kingdom had misinterpreted her comical effort with a perceived abandonment of her original musical inspiration, thus resulting in a relative underperformance in the country. In contrast, she felt that her American audience was more receptive of Electra Heart and her evolving public image. As of 2015, three million singles had been sold from Electra Heart.

In 2021, the album's opening track "Bubblegum Bitch"—despite never having been released as a single—experienced a resurgence on social media platform TikTok and subsequently was certified Gold in the United States.

== Track listing ==
Standard edition
No.	Title	Writer(s)	Producer(s)	Length
1.	"Bubblegum Bitch"	Marina Diamandis; Rick Nowels	Nowels; Dean Reid^{[a]}	2:34
2.	"Primadonna"	Diamandis; Julie Frost; Lukasz Gottwald; Henry Walter	Dr. Luke; Cirkut	3:41
3.	"Lies"	Diamandis; Gottwald; Thomas Pentz; Walter	Dr. Luke; Cirkut; Diplo^{[a]}	3:46
4.	"Homewrecker"	Diamandis; Nowels	Nowels	3:22
5.	"Starring Role"	Diamandis; Greg Kurstin	Kurstin	3:27
6.	"The State of Dreaming"	Diamandis; Devrim Karaoğlu; Nowels	Nowels; Karaoğlu	3:36
7.	"Power & Control"	Diamandis; Steve Angello	Kurstin	3:46
8.	"Living Dead"	Diamandis; Kurstin	Kurstin	4:04
9.	"Teen Idle"	Diamandis	Liam Howe; The Elite^{[b]}	4:14
10.	"Valley of the Dolls"	Diamandis; Karaoğlu; Nowels	Nowels; Karaoğlu	4:13
11.	"Hypocrates"	Diamandis; Nowels	Nowels; Karaoğlu	4:01
12.	"Fear and Loathing"	Diamandis	Howe	6:07
Total length:				46:51

Platinum blonde edition (vinyl edition bonus tracks)
No.	Title	Writer(s)	Producer(s)	Length
13.	"How to Be a Heartbreaker"	Diamandis; Gottwald; Benjamin Levin; Ammar Malik; Walter; Daniel Omelio	Dr. Luke; Cirkut; Benny Blanco	3:41
14.	"Lonely Hearts Club"	Diamandis; Ryan Rabin; Ryan McMahon	McMahon; Rabin	3:01
15.	"E.V.O.L."	Diamandis; Howe	Howe	3:43
16.	"Electra Heart"	Diamandis; Timothy Nelson	Nelson	3:43
Total length:				61:00

Platinum blonde edition (digital edition bonus tracks)
No.	Title	Writer(s)	Producer(s)	Length
13.	"How to Be a Heartbreaker"	Diamandis; Gottwald; Benjamin Levin; Ammar Malik; Walter; Daniel Omelio	Dr. Luke; Cirkut; Benny Blanco	3:41
14.	"Radioactive"	Diamandis; Mikkel S. Eriksen; Tor Erik Hermansen; Fabian Lenssen; Clyde Narain	Stargate; DJ Chuckie; Lenssen; Tim Blacksmith^{[c]}; Danny D.^{[c]}	3:47
15.	"Sex Yeah"	Diamandis; Kurstin	Kurstin	3:46
16.	"Buy the Stars"	Diamandis	Howe	4:47
17.	"Lonely Hearts Club"	Diamandis; Ryan Rabin; Ryan McMahon	McMahon; Rabin	3:01
18.	"E.V.O.L."	Diamandis; Howe	Howe	3:36
19.	"Electra Heart"	Diamandis; Timothy Nelson	Nelson	3:43
Total length:				73:19

Deluxe edition
No.	Title	Writer(s)	Producer(s)	Length
13.	"Radioactive"	Diamandis; Mikkel S. Eriksen; Tor Erik Hermansen; Fabian Lenssen; Clyde Narain	Stargate; DJ Chuckie; Lenssen; Tim Blacksmith^{[c]}; Danny D.^{[c]}	3:47
14.	"Sex Yeah"	Diamandis; Kurstin	Kurstin	3:46
15.	"Lonely Hearts Club"	Diamandis; Ryan Rabin; Ryan McMahon	McMahon; Rabin	3:01
16.	"Buy the Stars"	Diamandis	Howe	4:47
Total length:				62:12

iTunes Store deluxe video edition
No.	Title	Writer(s)	Producer(s)	Length
17.	"How to Be a Heartbreaker"	Diamandis; Gottwald; Benjamin Levin; Ammar Malik; Walter; Daniel Omelio	Dr. Luke; Cirkut; Benny Blanco	3:41
18.	"Radioactive" (music video)			3:48
19.	"Primadonna" (music video)			3:47
Total length:				73:28

American standard and vinyl edition
No.	Title	Writer(s)	Producer(s)	Length
8.	"Sex Yeah"	Diamandis; Kurstin	Kurstin	3:46
9.	"Teen Idle"	Diamandis	Howe; The Elite^{[b]}	4:14
10.	"Valley of the Dolls"	Diamandis; Karaoğlu; Nowels	Nowels; Karaoğlu	4:13
11.	"Hypocrates"	Diamandis; Nowels	Nowels; Karaoğlu	4:01
12.	"How to Be a Heartbreaker"	Diamandis; Gottwald; Levin; Malik; Walter; Omelio	Dr. Luke; Cirkut; Benny Blanco	3:41
13.	"Radioactive"	Diamandis; Eriksen; Hermansen; Lenssen; Narain	Stargate; DJ Chuckie; Lenssen; Blacksmith^{[c]}; Danny D.^{[c]}	3:47
14.	"Fear and Loathing"	Diamandis	Howe	6:07
Total length:				54:01

American and Canadian iTunes deluxe edition
No.	Title	Writer(s)	Producer(s)	Length
15.	"Primadonna" (Burns remix)	Diamandis; Frost; Gottwald; Walter	Dr. Luke; Cirkut; Burns^{[d]}	4:29
16.	"Power & Control" (Michael Woods remix)	Diamandis; Angello	Kurstin; Woods^{[d]}	6:38
17.	"Primadonna" (music video)			3:47
18.	"Radioactive" (music video)			3:48
Total length:				72:43

=== Notes ===
- ^{^[a]} signifies a co-producer.
- ^{^[b]} signifies an additional drum producer.
- ^{^[c]} signifies an executive producer.
- ^{^[d]} signifies a remixer.

== Personnel ==
Credits were adapted from the liner notes of the deluxe edition.

=== Musicians ===
- Marina Diamandis – vocals (all tracks); piano (tracks 9, 12, 16)
- Rick Nowels – keyboards (tracks 1, 4, 6, 10, 11); electric guitar (track 4); piano (tracks 6, 11)
- Dean Reid – drums, bass, keyboards (track 1); electric guitar (tracks 1, 6)
- Rusty Anderson – electric guitar (tracks 1, 4, 6, 10, 11); bouzouki (track 10)
- Tim Pierce – electric guitar (tracks 1, 6, 11)
- Dan Chase – keyboards (tracks 1, 4); drums, bass, programming (track 4)
- Dr. Luke – all instruments, programming (tracks 2, 3)
- Cirkut – all instruments, programming (tracks 2, 3)
- Diplo – additional programming (track 3)
- Greg Kurstin – keyboards, programming (tracks 5, 7, 8, 14); piano (track 5); guitar, bass (tracks 7, 8, 14)
- Devrim Karaoğlu – keyboards, drums, programming (tracks 6, 10, 11); strings (track 6); bass (tracks 10, 11)
- David Campbell – string arrangements, string conducting (tracks 6, 10)
- Liam Howe – santoor, Philicorda (track 9); synthesisers (tracks 9, 12); Mellotron, telegraph key, all programming (track 12)
- The Elite – additional drum programming (track 9)
- Matt Chamberlain – drums (track 11)
- Lambrini Kaklamani – additional vocal (track 12)
- Mikkel S. Eriksen – all instruments (track 13)
- Tor Erik Hermansen – all instruments (track 13)
- DJ Chuckie – all instruments (track 13)
- Fabian Lenssen – all instruments (track 13)
- Ryan Rabin – all instruments, programming (track 15)
- Ryan McMahon – all instruments, programming (track 15)

=== Technical ===
- Rick Nowels – production (tracks 1, 4, 6, 10, 11)
- Dean Reid – co-production, recording (track 1)
- Kieron Menzies – recording (tracks 1, 4, 6, 10, 11)
- Nigel Lundemo – additional engineering (tracks 1, 4, 6, 10, 11)
- John Ingoldsby – additional engineering (tracks 1, 4, 6, 10, 11)
- Trevor Yasuda – engineering assistance (tracks 1, 4, 6, 10, 11)
- Mark "Spike" Stent – mixing (tracks 1, 4, 6, 10, 11)
- Matty Green – mixing assistance (tracks 1, 4, 6, 10, 11)
- Dr. Luke – production (tracks 2, 3)
- Cirkut – production (tracks 2, 3)
- Serban Ghenea – mixing (tracks 2, 3, 5, 7, 8, 14)
- Clint Gibbs – engineering (tracks 2, 3)
- Jon Sher – engineering assistance (tracks 2, 3)
- Irene Richter – production coordination (tracks 2, 3)
- Katie Mitzell – production coordination (tracks 2, 3)
- John Hanes – mix engineering (tracks 2, 3, 5, 7, 8, 14)
- Tim Roberts – mix engineering assistance (tracks 2, 3, 5, 7, 8, 14)
- Phil Seaford – mix engineering assistance (tracks 2, 3, 5, 7, 8, 14)
- Diplo – co-production (track 3)
- Greg Kurstin – engineering (tracks 5, 7, 14); production (tracks 5, 7, 8, 14)
- Jesse Shatkin – additional engineering (tracks 5, 7, 14)
- Devrim Karaoğlu – production (tracks 6, 10, 11)
- Charlie Paakkari – engineering (tracks 6, 10)
- Liam Howe – production; mixing (tracks 9, 12, 16)
- The Elite – additional drum production (track 9)
- Stargate – production (track 13)
- DJ Chuckie – production (track 13)
- Fabian Lenssen – production, recording, additional engineering assistance (track 13)
- Mikkel S. Eriksen – recording (track 13)
- Miles Walker – recording (track 13)
- Phil Tan – mixing (track 13)
- Damien Lewis – additional engineering assistance (track 13)
- Tim Blacksmith – executive production (track 13)
- Danny D. – executive production (track 13)
- Ryan McMahon – production, recording, engineering (track 15)
- Ryan Rabin – production, recording, engineering (track 15)
- Dan Parry – mixing (track 15)

=== Artwork ===
- Casper Balslev – photography
- Big Active – layout

== Charts ==
=== Weekly charts ===
Weekly chart performance
Chart (2012–2022)	Peak position
Australian Albums (ARIA)	32
Austrian Albums (Ö3 Austria)	25
Belgian Albums (Ultratop Flanders)	188
Belgian Albums (Ultratop Wallonia)	132
Canadian Albums (Billboard)	50
Dutch Albums (Album Top 100)	86
German Albums (Offizielle Top 100)	17
Irish Albums (IRMA)	1
New Zealand Albums (RMNZ)	31
Norwegian Albums (VG-lista)	30
Scottish Albums (Official Charts)	1
Swedish Albums (Sverigetopplistan)	41
Swiss Albums (Schweizer Hitparade)	11
UK Albums (Official Charts)	1
US Billboard 200	31
US Top Dance Albums (Billboard)	2

=== Year-end charts ===
2012 year-end chart performance
Chart (2012)	Position
UK Albums (OCC)	155
US Dance/Electronic Albums (Billboard)	24

2013 year-end chart performance
Chart (2013)	Position
US Dance/Electronic Albums (Billboard)	14

2021 year-end chart performance
Chart (2021)	Position
US Dance/Electronic Albums (Billboard)	21

2022 year-end chart performance
Chart (2022)	Position
US Dance/Electronic Albums (Billboard)	16

== Certifications ==
List of certifications and sales
Region	Certification	Certified units/sales
Denmark (IFPI Danmark)	Gold	10,000^{‡}
Ireland (IRMA)	Gold	7,500^{^}
New Zealand (RMNZ)	Platinum	15,000^{‡}
United Kingdom (BPI)	Gold	100,000^{‡}
United States (RIAA)	Gold	500,000^{‡}
^{^} Shipments figures based on certification alone.^{‡} Sales+streaming figures based on certification alone.

== Release history ==
List of release dates and formats
Region	Date	Format(s)	Edition(s)	Label(s)	Ref.
Ireland	27 April 2012	CD; digital download	Standard; deluxe	679; Atlantic	
United Kingdom	30 April 2012	CD; digital download	Standard; deluxe; box set	679; Atlantic	
Sweden	2 May 2012	CD; digital download	Standard; deluxe	Warner	
Portugal	6 May 2012	CD; digital download	Standard; deluxe	Warner	
Spain	6 May 2012	CD; digital download	Standard; deluxe	Warner	
Austria	11 May 2012	CD; digital download	Standard; deluxe	Warner	
Greece	14 May 2012	CD; digital download	Standard; deluxe	Warner	
Russia	14 May 2012	CD; digital download	Standard; deluxe	Warner	
Australia	18 May 2012	CD; digital download	Standard; deluxe	Warner	
New Zealand	18 May 2012	CD; digital download	Standard; deluxe	Warner	
Switzerland	18 May 2012	CD; digital download	Standard; deluxe	Warner	
Italy	22 May 2012	CD; digital download	Standard; deluxe	Warner	
Germany	25 May 2012	CD; digital download	Standard; deluxe	Warner	
Netherlands	25 May 2012	CD; digital download	Standard; deluxe	Warner	
Brazil	18 June 2012	Digital download	Standard; deluxe	Warner	
Poland	18 June 2012	CD; digital download	Standard; deluxe	Warner	
Canada	10 July 2012	CD; digital download	Standard; deluxe	Warner	
United States	10 July 2012	CD; digital download	Standard; deluxe; box set	Atlantic; Elektra	
Brazil	11 July 2012	CD	Standard	Warner	
Australia	30 October 2015	LP	Standard	Warner	
United Kingdom	30 October 2015	LP	Standard	679; Atlantic	
United States	30 October 2015	LP	Standard	Atlantic; Elektra	
Various	29 April 2022	Digital download	Platinum blonde	Atlantic	
United Kingdom	23 September 2022	LP	Platinum blonde	Atlantic	
United States	23 September 2022	LP	Platinum blonde	Atlantic	

== See also ==
- List of number-one albums of 2012 (Ireland)
- List of UK Albums Chart number ones of the 2010s
