= Radioactive (Marina and the Diamonds song) =

Promotional single by Marina and the Diamonds

from the album Electra Heart
- Released: 23 September 2011
- Genre: Eurodance; dance-pop
- Length: 3:47
- Label: 679; Atlantic
- Songwriter(s): Marina Diamandis; Mikkel S. Eriksen; Tor Erik Hermansen; Fabian Lenssen; Clyde Narain
- Producer(s): StarGate; DJ Chuckie; Lenssen

Music video
- Radioactive on YouTube

"Radioactive" is a song by Welsh recording artist Marina Diamandis, released under the stage name Marina and the Diamonds, from the deluxe version of her second studio album Electra Heart (2012). It was released on 23 September 2011 as the first promotional single from the record; it preceded the premiere of the official lead single "Primadonna" on 20 March 2012.

The song is a Eurodance and dance-pop composition produced by the Norwegian duo Stargate, a marked departure from Diamandis' first album The Family Jewels. Critics praised her change in style and how her vocals and lyrics differentiated the track from other chart songs. The song peaked at number 25 in the UK Singles Chart and 37 in the Irish Singles Chart.

== Background and composition ==
Diamandis said of "Radioactive":

I wrote "Radioactive" in New York in the middle of a heat wave. Introduced to a glittering new nightlife, I fell in love with New York; it has this magic, fizzing white energy that no other city in the world has. I felt happy and was inspired to write a song that felt light and euphoric, a more streamlined, minimalistic style of songwriting. I have changed my approach to songwriting completely, and as a result, written songs I would never have written on my own (i.e on my shit Argos keyboard alone in my bedroom in London).

Musically, "Radioactive" is a Eurodance and dance-pop song with a minimalist club beat. It was produced by Norwegian duo Stargate, whose previous credits included compositions for Rihanna and Katy Perry.

== Critical reception ==
"Radioactive" received mostly positive reviews from music critics, who praised Diamindis' shift in style from the alternative content of The Family Jewels to mainstream chart music. Digital Spy editor Robert Copsey gave the song four out of five stars, regarding the chorus as "radio-friendly, synth-laden, and deeply hypnotic". He wrote that the decision to work with Stargate may have been ironic. Popjustice named it Song of the Day and commented that while it does not initially sound like one of her songs, it eventually does and becomes "amazing".

In a review for MTV Buzzworthy, Bradley Stern opined that the song's "cutting, sinister lyricism and vocal acrobatics" separated it from Diamindis' previous work. Damien Ryan of So So Gay, rating the track four-and-a-half stars out of five, expressed it is "like nothing else we've heard from Marina, yet still manages to sound distinctly her". He considered the instrumental to be very similar to Stargate's work with Rihanna, but highlighted Diamandis' vocals as making a difference. This Is Fake DIY's Gareth O'Malley scored "Radioactive" seven out of ten, concluding that "[t]his is a good pop song, yes, and an even better single, but she can definitely do better."

== Music video ==
The music video for "Radioactive" was directed by Caspar Balslev, and is the second part of the Electra Heart music video series, following "Fear & Loathing" (also directed by Balslev). It was shot in Los Angeles and premiered on 22 August 2011. Prior to the video's premiere, Diamandis teased several promotional images of the video via her official Tumblr account, mostly featuring shots of the desert environment and images of her in a blonde wig.

Diamandis explained the concept behind the video in an interview with Popjustice, saying:

That's like a really 70s thing, it's set in the desert... I just think every artist always has something at the core of them that fascinates them and inspires them. In the beginning I had exactly the same thought—"oh God, I'm still inspired by America, I don't want to make 'Hollywood Pt II'". And it's not like that. I'm just really inspired by that topic and that culture and I think I always will be. It's kind of like how every longterm artist always has a thread running through their image, or their lyrics, and that's mine. America.

The video centers around Diamandis and her male companion on the run. The first scenes show her packing a suitcase into a car, applying a white blonde wig, and leaving the premises with her partner. Following this, the couple is shown trashing a house, arriving at a motel, purchasing food from a supermarket, whilst in disguise, and sitting in a diner. The final scenes feature Diamandis dancing in the streets and the couple wandering in the desert. Diamandis removes her wig and proceeds to wander alone in the desert. As of 16 July 2023, Radioactive has accumulated 15,045,910 YouTube views.

== Remixes ==
Alternate versions

- "Radioactive (Extended Edit)" – 4:43
- "Radioactive (Acoustic)" – 3:30

Official remixes

- "Radioactive (Tom Staar Remix)" – 5:20
- "Radioactive (Chuckie Big House Mix)" – 6:00
- "Radioactive (How to Dress Well Remix)" – 5:12
- "Radioactive (Captain Cuts Remix)" – 4:06

== Charts ==
Chart performance for "Radioactive"
Chart (2011)	Peak position
Ireland (IRMA)	37
Scotland (OCC)	25
UK Singles (OCC)	25

== Release history ==
Release dates and formats for "Radioactive"
Region	Date	Format	Label(s)	Ref.
Australia	23 September 2011	Digital download	Warner	
Ireland	30 September 2011	Digital download	679; Atlantic	
United Kingdom	30 September 2011	Digital download	679; Atlantic	
