= Bubblegum Bitch =

- Bubblegum Bitch (The TikTok Hits) playlist cover

Song by Marina and the Diamonds

from the album Electra Heart
- Released: 27 April 2012
- Recorded: 2011
- Genre: Electropop; pop-punk; new wave; bubblegum pop
- Length: 2:32
- Label: 679; Atlantic
- Songwriters: Marina Diamandis; Rick Nowels
- Producers: Rick Nowels; Dean Reid

Live video
- "Bubblegum Bitch" (Live from the Desert) on YouTube

"Bubblegum Bitch" is a song by Welsh singer-songwriter Marina Diamandis, professionally known as Marina and formerly as Marina and the Diamonds. An opening track on her second studio album, Electra Heart (2012), it was released on 27 April 2012 along with the record. While the production was handled by Rick Nowels and Dean Reird, the song was written by Diamandis and Nowels. Despite not having been released as a single, the song entered international charts after experiencing a resurgence on social media platform TikTok in early 2021, thanks to which it subsequently was certified gold in the United States in March and silver in the United Kingdom in September the same year.

== Background ==
The song was written by Diamandis and Nowels in June 2011 in Santa Monica, California, inspired by the book Bubblegum: The History of Plastic Pop by a British journalist, Nick Brownlee. Speaking about the song in a promotional track-by-track interview, Marina said it was "maybe" her favourite track off the album, describing it as a "fun, sassy song". the song's verses took ten minutes to write, though they were collected over a period of three months. Marina expressed her interest in releasing the song as a single in 2012, but she said that she could not do it due to the vulgar title, acknowledging radio constraints. "Some songs sound like singles, but you can't release them", she explained in an interview to PopJustice. After the resurgence in 2021, when promoting her fifth studio album, Ancient Dreams in a Modern Land, Marina said that her record label, Atlantic Records, wanted her to shoot a music video to the song, but she declined the offer, saying she "can't go back to the past". As observed by the press, "it probably also didn't help that she was promoting a string of feminist anthems at the time for a new album, which lyrically contrasts the more playful viral hit in quite the dramatic fashion".

== Critical reception ==
A song channelling the playful "spirit of Britney Spears at her most syrupy sweet" was met with mixed feelings at initial critics' response. Alexis Petridis from The Guardian compared the lyrical content used throughout the pop punk-inspired Electra Heart opener "Bubblegum Bitch" to "the self-fulfilling I-will-be-huge prophecy" that was developed in The Fame by Lady Gaga. Describing the track as "capricious", James Cristopher from AllMusic praised Marina's "resonant operatic voice", finding it expressive enough to make the song's lyrics "feel less like a floozy come-on and more like a malicious schoolyard taunt". However, Emily Mackay from The Quietus deemed both the title and the lyrical content of the song "cringeworthy", saying "with all the vapidity promised but little in the way of analysis thereof, though it's a passable bit of Katy Perryish stomp that retains some of her Sparksy, camp oddness". George Boorman from Clash in his highly negative review of the album said in his laconic final words: "There is actually a song called 'Bubblegum Bitch' on this album. 'nuff said".

== Charts ==
Chart performance for "Bubblegum Bitch"
Chart (2021)	Peak position
Greece (IFPI)	98
Lithuania (AGATA)	89

== Certifications ==
Certifications for "Bubblegum Bitch"
Region	Certification	Certified units/sales
New Zealand (RMNZ)	Platinum	30,000^{‡}
United Kingdom (BPI)	Gold	400,000^{‡}
United States (RIAA)	Platinum	1,000,000^{‡}
^{‡} Sales+streaming figures based on certification alone.
