= List of songs recorded by Marina Diamandis =

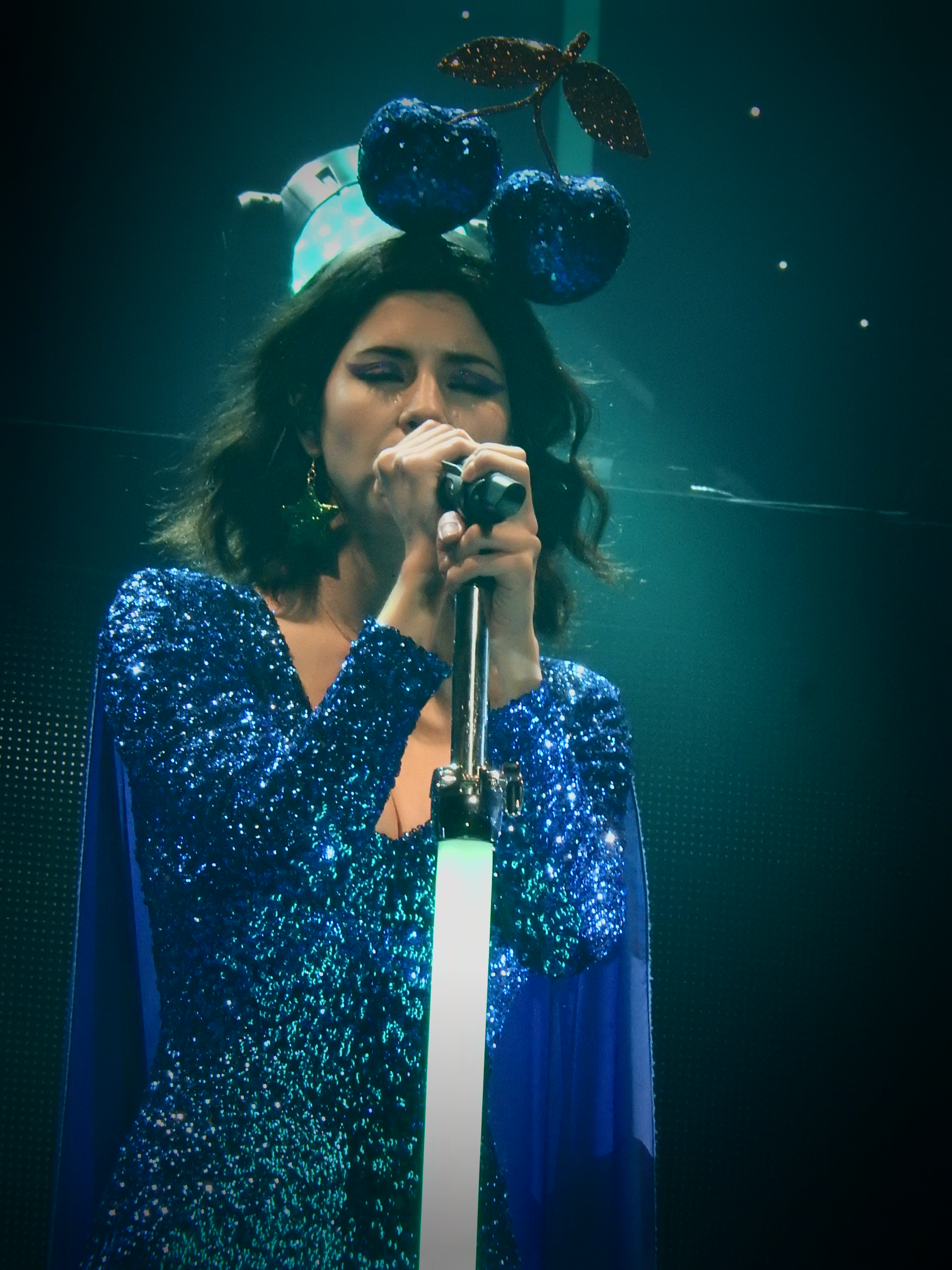
Diamandis performing at the Roundhouse, February 2016

Welsh singer-songwriter Marina Diamandis, known mononymously as Marina and formerly by her stage name Marina and the Diamonds, has recorded songs for four studio albums and two extended plays. She first came to public prominence after being ranked in second place on the Sound of 2010 poll organised by the BBC. Her debut studio album The Family Jewels was released that February, and featured material from her first two extended plays, The Crown Jewels EP (2009) and The American Jewels EP (2010), in addition to newly recorded content. Diamandis co-wrote each of the album's thirteen tracks, including its five singles "Mowgli's Road", "Hollywood", "I Am Not a Robot", "Oh No!", and "Shampain". Songwriters and producers Liam Howe and Pascal Gabriel respectively co-wrote four and three tracks for the record. In 2009 and 2010, Diamandis recorded cover versions of the songs "What You Waiting For?" by Gwen Stefani and "Starstrukk" by 3OH!3, respectively.

Diamandis co-wrote each of the seventeen tracks featured on the standard, deluxe, and U.S. versions of her second studio album Electra Heart, which was released in March 2012. Its lead single "Primadonna" became her highest-charting track in the United Kingdom, peaking at number 11 on the UK Singles Chart. The song saw additional songwriting contributions from producers Dr. Luke and Cirkut, who collaborated again when co-writing the track "Lies". Rick Nowels frequently partnered with Diamandis during production of the record, and was consequently given writing credits on four songs from the project. Diamandis released the track "Just Desserts" featuring Charli XCX through SoundCloud and YouTube in May 2013, her first collaboration with another recording artist. Diamandis's previously unreleased title track "Electra Heart" was released in May 2014, on which she is credited by online music stores as a featured artist alongside producer BetaTraxx. Diamandis's third studio album Froot (2015) is preceded by its title track, which was solely written by Diamandis.

== Songs ==
Key
†	Indicates single release

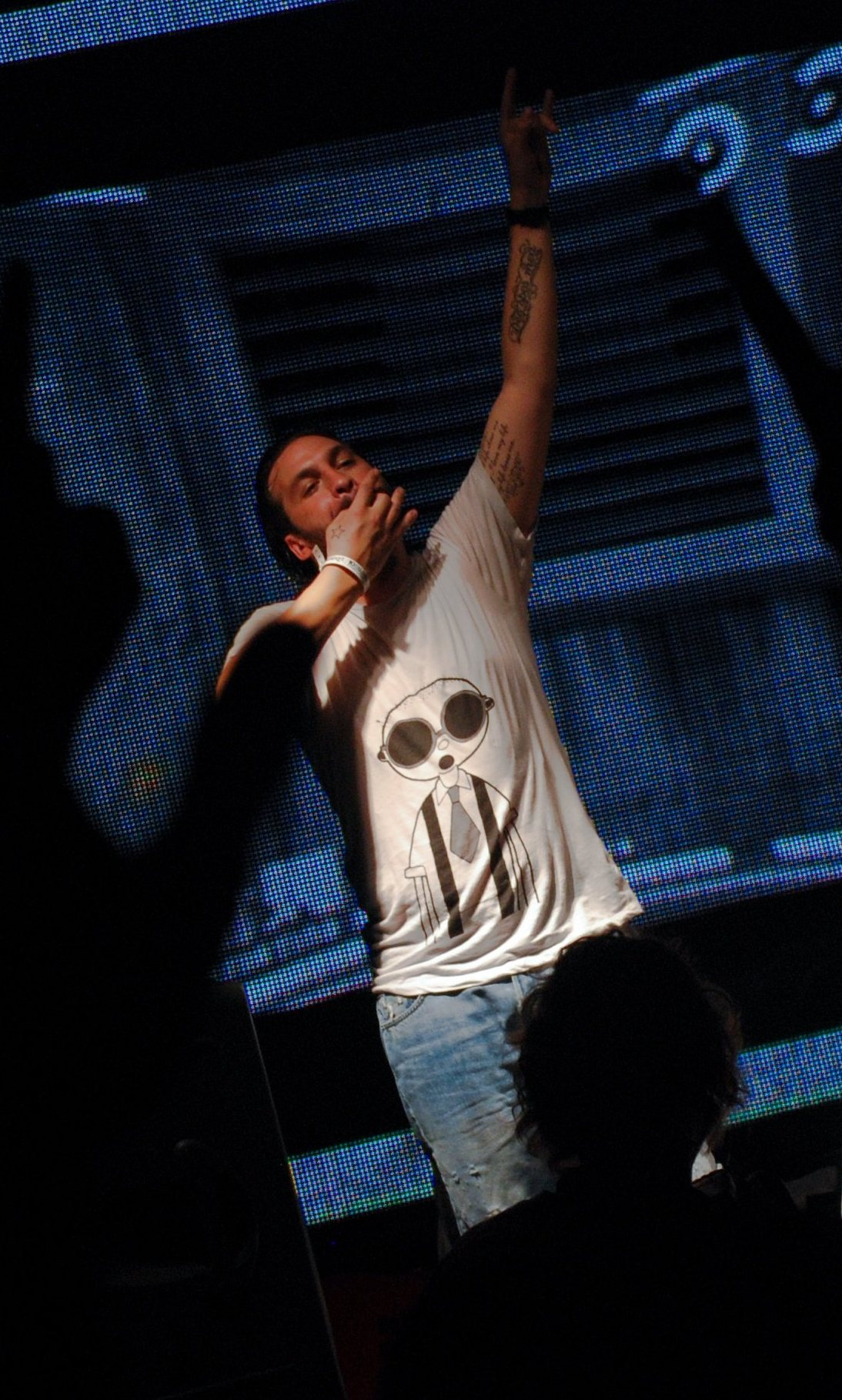
Steve Angello (pictured) from the Swedish House Mafia co-wrote "Power & Control" from Electra Heart.

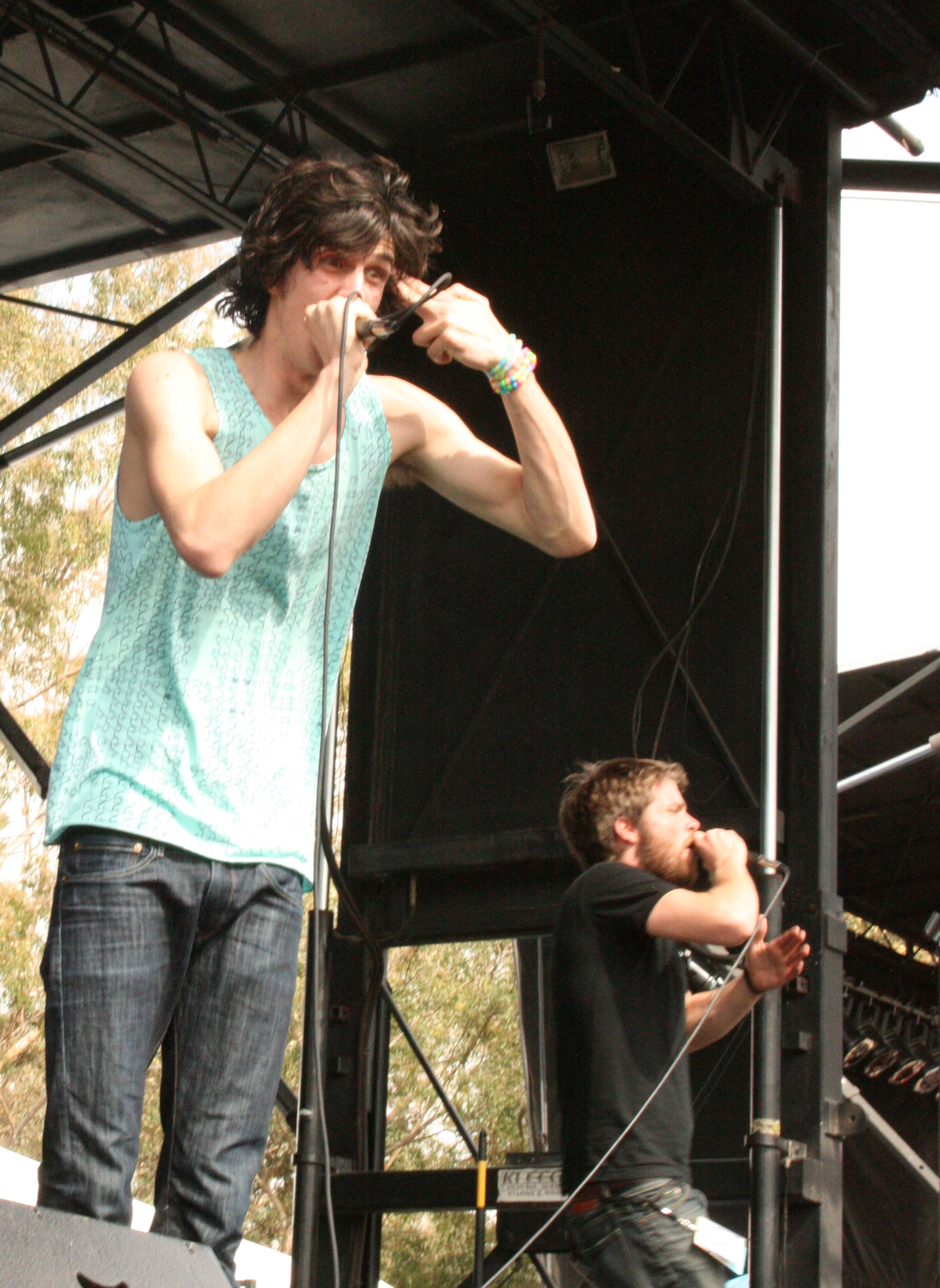
In 2010, Diamandis performed a cover version of "Starstrukk" by 3OH!3 (pictured).

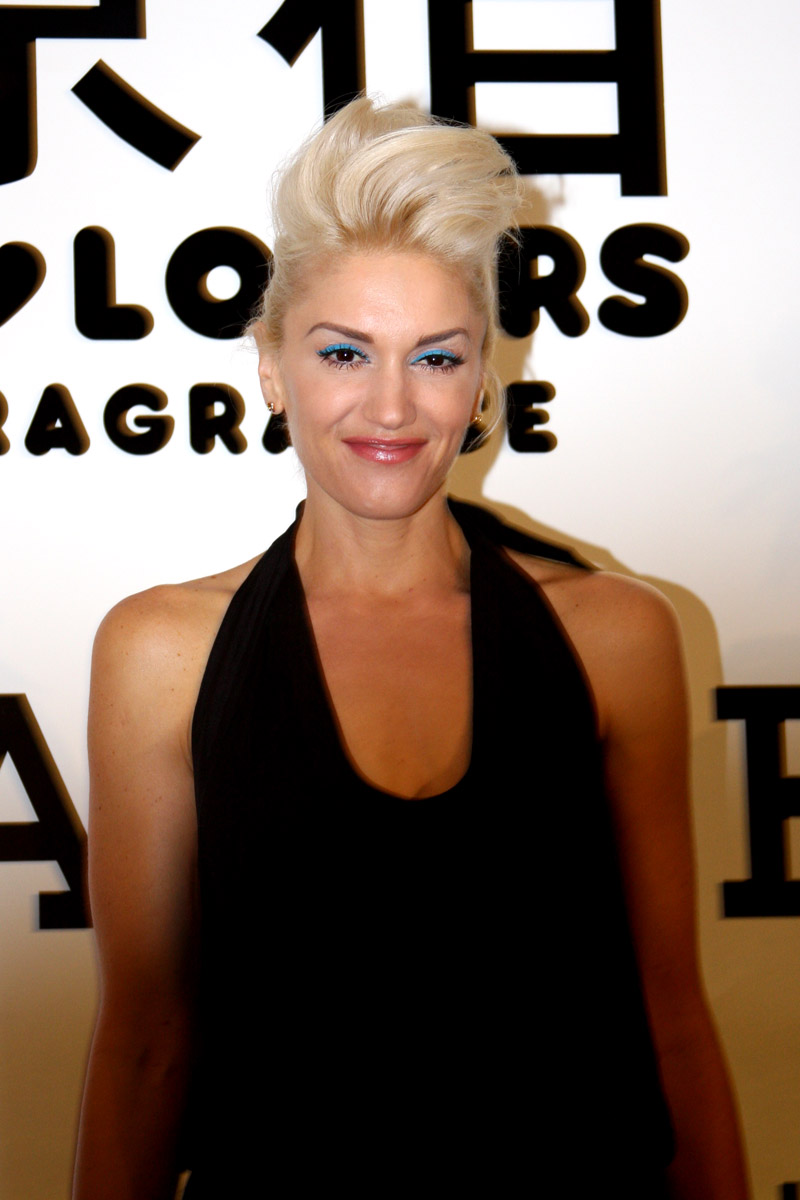
Diamandis covered "What You Waiting For?" by Gwen Stefani (pictured) in 2009.

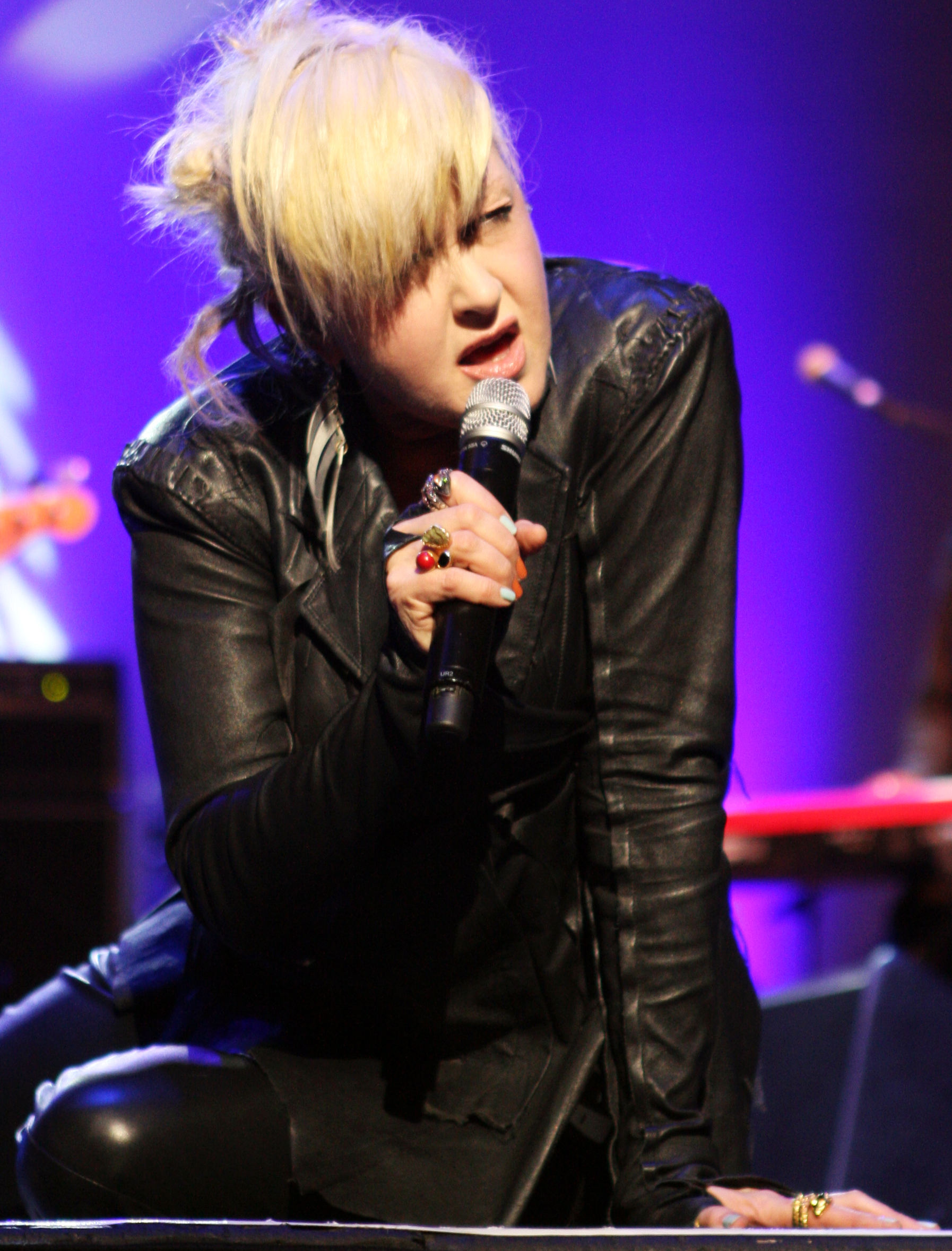
Diamandis covered "True Colors" by Cyndi Lauper (pictured) in 2016.

List of songs recorded by Marina and the Diamonds
Song	Artist(s)	Writer(s)	Album(s)	Year	Ref.
"About Love" †	Marina	Marina Diamandis; Benjamin Berger; Ryan McMahon; Ryan Rabin	To All the Boys: P.S. I Still Love You (Music from the Netflix Film)	2020	
"Adult Girl"	Marina	Marina Diamandis; Christopher J. Baran	Princess of Power	2025	
"Ancient Dreams In A Modern Land" †	Marina	Marina Diamandis	Ancient Dreams in a Modern Land	2021	
"Are You Satisfied?"	Marina and the Diamonds	Marina Diamandis	The Family Jewels	2010	
"Baby" †	Clean Bandit featuring Marina and Luis Fonsi	Marina Diamandis; Jack Patterson; Camille Purcell; Jason Evigan; Matthew Knott; Luis Lopez-Cepero	What Is Love? Love + Fear	2018	
"Bad Kidz"	Marina and the Diamonds	Marina Diamandis; Liam Howe; Pascal Gabriel	Hollywood	2010	
"Believe in Love"	Marina	Marina Diamandis; OzGo	Love + Fear	2019	
"Better Than That"	Marina and the Diamonds	Marina Diamandis	Froot	2015	
"Blue" †	Marina and the Diamonds	Marina Diamandis	Froot	2015	
"Bubblegum Bitch"	Marina and the Diamonds	Marina Diamandis; Rick Nowels	Electra Heart	2012	
"Butterfly" †	Marina	Marina Diamandis	Princess of Power	2025	
"Buy the Stars"	Marina and the Diamonds	Marina Diamandis	Electra Heart (UK Deluxe Version)	2012	
"Can't Pin Me Down"	Marina and the Diamonds	Marina Diamandis	Froot	2015	
"Cuntissimo" †	Marina	Marina Diamandis	Princess of Power	2025	
"Cupid's Girl" †	Marina	Marina Diamandis; Christopher J. Baran	Princess of Power	2025	
"Digital Fantasy"	Marina	Marina Diamandis; Christopher J. Baran	Princess of Power	2025	
"Disconnect" †	Marina and the Diamonds and Clean Bandit	Marina Diamandis; Jack Patterson	Non-album song	2017	
"Electra Heart"	BetaTraxx featuring Marina and the Diamonds	Marina Diamandis; Tim Nelson	Electra Heart (Platinum Blonde Edition)	2013	
"Emotional Machine"	Marina	Marina Diamandis; Georgia Nott; Caleb Knott; Sam de Jong	Love + Fear	2019	
"End Of The Earth"	Marina	Marina Diamandis; Joseph Janiak; James Flannigan	Love + Fear	2019	
"Enjoy Your Life"	Marina	Marina Diamandis; Jonnali Parmenius; Oscar Holter	Love + Fear	2019	
"Everybody Knows I'm Sad"	Marina	Marina Diamandis	Princess of Power	2025	
"E.V.O.L."	Marina and the Diamonds	Marina Diamandis; Liam Howe	Electra Heart (Platinum Blonde Edition)	2013	
"The Family Jewels"	Marina and the Diamonds	Marina Diamandis	The Family Jewels (iTunes Store and Japanese versions)	2010	
"Fear and Loathing"	Marina and the Diamonds	Marina Diamandis	Electra Heart	2012	
"Final Boss"	Marina	Marina Diamandis; Christopher J. Baran	Princess of Power	2025	
"Flowers"	Marina	Marina Diamandis	Ancient Dreams in a Modern Land	2021	
"Forget" †	Marina and the Diamonds	Marina Diamandis	Froot	2015	
"Free Woman"	Marina	Marina Diamandis	Ancient Dreams in a Modern Land	2022	
"Froot" †	Marina and the Diamonds	Marina Diamandis	Froot	2014	
"Girls"	Marina and the Diamonds	Marina Diamandis; Liam Howe; Pascal Gabriel	The Family Jewels	2010	
"Gold"	Marina and the Diamonds	Marina Diamandis	Froot	2015	
"Goodbye"	Marina	Marina Diamandis	Ancient Dreams in a Modern Land	2021	
"Guilty"	Marina and the Diamonds	Marina Diamandis; Richard Stannard; Ash Howes	The Family Jewels	2010	
"Handmade Heaven" †	Marina	Marina Diamandis	Love + Fear	2019	
"Happy" †	Marina and the Diamonds	Marina Diamandis	Froot	2015	
"Happy Loner" †	Marina	Marina Diamandis	Ancient Dreams in a Modern Land	2021	
"Hello Kitty"	Marina	Marina Diamandis; Christopher J. Baran	Princess of Power	2025	
"Hermit the Frog"	Marina and the Diamonds	Marina Diamandis	The Family Jewels	2010	
"Highly Emotional People"	Marina	Marina Diamandis	Ancient Dreams in a Modern Land	2021	
"Hollywood" †	Marina and the Diamonds	Marina Diamandis	The Family Jewels	2010	
"Homewrecker"	Marina and the Diamonds	Marina Diamandis; Rick Nowels	Electra Heart	2012	
"How to Say Goodbye"	Marina	Marina Diamandis; Christopher J. Baran	Princess of Power (Deluxe)	2025	
"How to Be a Heartbreaker" †	Marina and the Diamonds	Marina Diamandis; Łukasz Gottwald; Benjamin Levin; Ammar Malik; Henry Walter; Daniel Omelio	Electra Heart (iTunes Store and U.S. versions)	2012	
"Hypocrates"	Marina and the Diamonds	Marina Diamandis; Rick Nowels	Electra Heart	2012	
"I Am Not a Robot" †	Marina and the Diamonds	Marina Diamandis	The Crown Jewels EP; The Family Jewels; The American Jewels EP	2009	
"I Love You But I Love Me More"	Marina	Marina Diamandis	Ancient Dreams in a Modern Land	2021	
"I <3 You"	Marina	Marina Diamandis; Christopher J. Baran	Princess of Power	2025	
"If I Left the World"	Gryffin featuring Marina and Model Child	Marina Diamandis; Benjamin Kohn; Peter Kelleher; Thomas Barnes; Daniel Griffith; Danny Parker	Gravity	2019	
"I'm a Ruin" †	Marina and the Diamonds	Marina Diamandis	Froot	2015	
"Immortal"	Marina and the Diamonds	Marina Diamandis	Froot	2015	
"I’m Not Hungry Anymore"	Marina and the Diamonds	Marina Diamandis	Froot (10 Year Anniversary Edition)	2025	
"Je Ne Sais Quoi"	Marina	Marina Diamandis; Christopher J. Baran	Princess of Power	2025	
"Just Desserts"	Marina and the Diamonds featuring Charli XCX	Marina Diamandis; Charlotte Aitchison	Non-album song	2013	
"Karma"	Marina	Marina Diamandis; Jack Patterson; Benjamin Berger; Ryan McMahon; Ryan Rabin	Love + Fear	2019	
"Key to the Castle"	Marina	Marina Diamandis; Christopher J. Baran	Princess of Power (Deluxe)	2025	
"Lies"	Marina and the Diamonds	Marina Diamandis; Łukasz Gottwald; Thomas Pentz; Henry Walter	Electra Heart	2012	
"Life is Strange"	Marina	Marina Diamandis; Joel Little	Love + Fear	2019	
"Living Dead"	Marina and the Diamonds	Marina Diamandis; Greg Kurstin	Electra Heart (UK version)	2012	
"Lonely Hearts Club"	Marina and the Diamonds	Marina Diamandis; Ryan Rabin; Ryan McMahon	Electra Heart (UK deluxe version)	2012	
"Man's World" †	Marina	Marina Diamandis	Ancient Dreams in a Modern Land	2020	
"Metallic Stallion"	Marina	Marina Diamandis; Christopher J. Baran	Princess of Power	2025	
"Mowgli's Road" †	Marina and the Diamonds	Marina Diamandis; Liam Howe	The Family Jewels	2010	
"New America"	Marina	Marina Diamandis	Ancient Dreams in a Modern Land	2021	
"No More Suckers"	Marina	Marina Diamandis; Alexandra Robotham; James Flannigan	Love + Fear	2019	
"Numb"	Marina and the Diamonds	Marina Diamandis	The Family Jewels	2010	
"Obsessions"	Marina and the Diamonds	Marina Diamandis	The Family Jewels; The American Jewels EP	2010	
"Oh No!" †	Marina and the Diamonds	Marina Diamandis; Greg Kurstin	The Family Jewels	2010	
"Orange Trees" †	Marina	Marina Diamandis; Jakob Jerlström; OzGo; Erik Hassle	Love + Fear	2019	
"The Outsider"	Marina and the Diamonds	Marina Diamandis	The Family Jewels	2010	
"Pandora's Box"	Marina	Marina Diamandis	Ancient Dreams in a Modern Land	2021	
"Pink Convertible"	Marina	Marina Diamandis	Ancient Dreams in a Modern Land	2022	
"Power & Control" †	Marina and the Diamonds	Marina Diamandis; Steve Angello	Electra Heart	2012	
"Primadonna" †	Marina and the Diamonds	Marina Diamandis; Julie Frost; Łukasz Gottwald; Henry Walter	Electra Heart	2012	
"Princess of Power"	Marina	Marina Diamandis; Christopher J. Baran	Princess of Power	2025	
"Purge the Poison" †	Marina	Marina Diamandis	Ancient Dreams in a Modern Land	2021	
"Radioactive" †	Marina and the Diamonds	Marina Diamandis; Mikkel S. Eriksen; Tor Erik Hermansen; Fabian Lenssen; Clyde Narain	Electra Heart (Deluxe and U.S. versions)	2012	
"Rollercoaster"	Marina	Marina Diamandis	Princess of Power	2025	
"Rootless"	Marina and the Diamonds	Marina Diamandis; Liam Howe; Pascal Gabriel	The Family Jewels	2010	
"Savages"	Marina and the Diamonds	Marina Diamandis	Froot	2015	
"Seventeen"	Marina and the Diamonds	Marina Diamandis	The Family Jewels (Japanese and U.S. versions)	2010	
"Sex Is Power"	Marina	Marina Diamandis; Christopher J. Baran	Princess of Power (Deluxe)	2025	
"Sex Yeah"	Marina and the Diamonds	Marina Diamandis; Greg Kurstin	Electra Heart (deluxe and U.S. versions)	2012	
"Shampain" †	Marina and the Diamonds	Marina Diamandis; Liam Howe; Pascal Gabriel	The Family Jewels	2010	
"Simplify"	Marina and the Diamonds	Marina Diamandis	The Crown Jewels EP	2009	
"Soft to Be Strong"	Marina	Marina Diamandis; Rick Nowels	Love + Fear	2019	
"Solitaire"	Marina and the Diamonds	Marina Diamandis	Froot	2015	
"Space and the Woods"	Marina and the Diamonds	Sam Eastgate	Mowgli's Road	2009	
"Starring Role"	Marina and the Diamonds	Marina Diamandis; Greg Kurstin	Electra Heart	2012	
"Starstrukk"	Marina and the Diamonds	Sean Foreman; Nathaniel Motte	Radio 1's Live Lounge – Volume 5 Oh No!	2010	
"The State of Dreaming"	Marina and the Diamonds	Marina Diamandis; Devrim Karaoğlu; Rick Nowels	Electra Heart	2012	
"Superstar" †	Marina	Marina Diamandis; Benjamin Berger; Ryan McMahon; Ryan Rabin	Love + Fear	2019	
"Teen Idle"	Marina and the Diamonds	Marina Diamandis	Electra Heart	2012	
"To Be Human"	Marina	Marina Diamandis	Love + Fear	2019	
"Too Afraid"	Marina	Marina Diamandis; Justin Parker	Love + Fear	2019	
"True"	Marina	Marina Diamandis; Jonnali Parmenius; Oscar Holter; OzGo	Love + Fear	2019	
"True Colours"	Marina and the Diamonds	Tom Kelly; Billy Steinberg	Non-album song	2016	
"Unfamiliar Heavens"	Marina	Marina Diamandis; Christopher J. Baran	Princess of Power (Deluxe)	2025	
"Venus Fly Trap" †	Marina	Marina Diamandis	Ancient Dreams in a Modern Land	2021	
"Weeds"	Marina and the Diamonds	Marina Diamandis	Froot	2015	
"What You Waiting For?"	Marina and the Diamonds	Gwen Stefani; Linda Perry	iTunes Festival: London 2009	2009	
"You"	Marina	Marina Diamandis; Jack Patterson; Joseph Janiak	Love + Fear	2019	
