= Marina Diamandis discography =

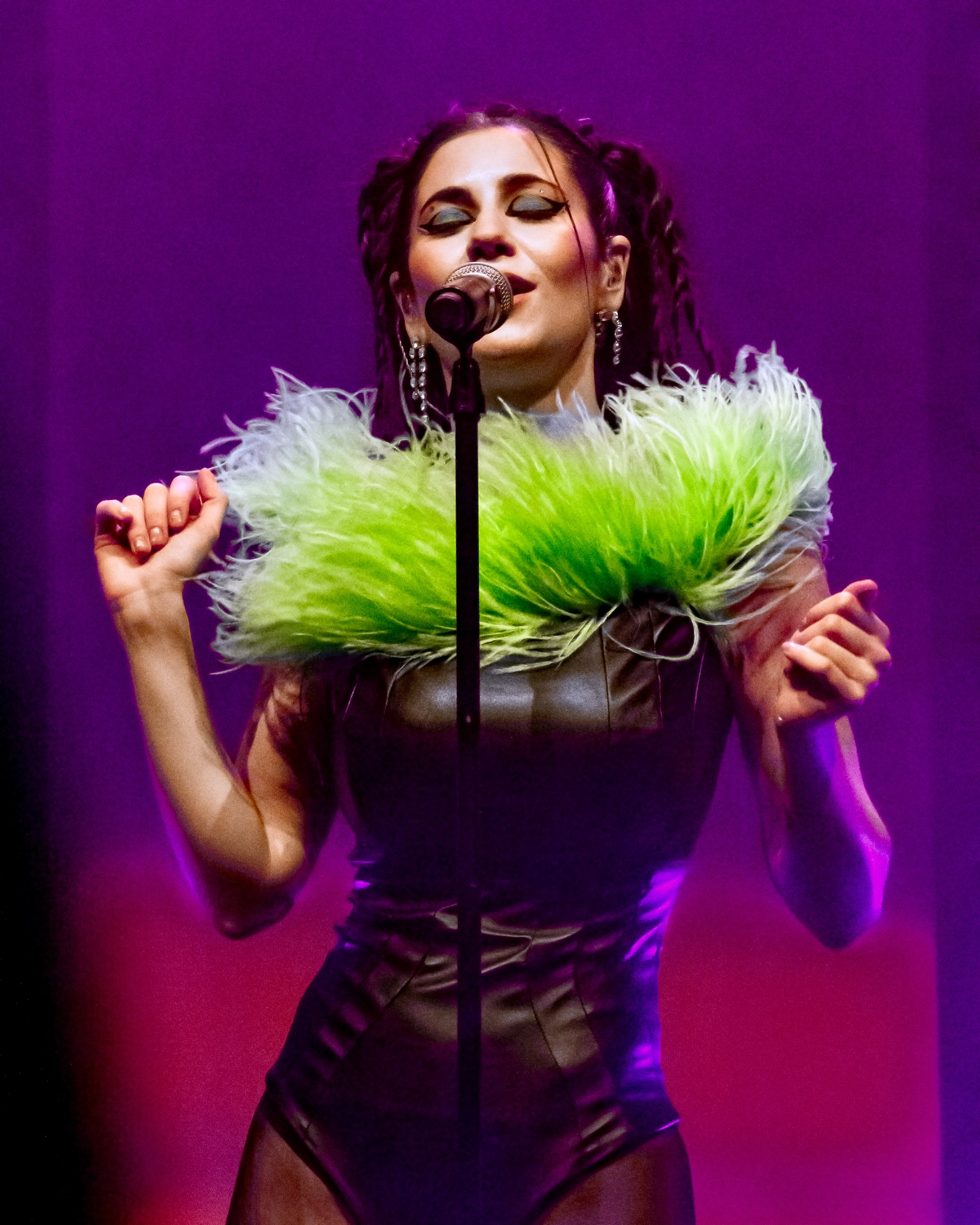
- Diamandis performing during her Ancient Dreams in a Modern Land Tour (2022)
- Studio albums: 6
- Extended plays: 7
- Singles: 30
- Music videos: 31
- Promotional singles: 8

Welsh singer and songwriter Marina Diamandis has released six studio albums, seven extended plays, 30 singles (including two as a featured artist), eight promotional singles and 31 music videos. The singer first created her former stage name Marina and the Diamonds in 2005, and performed under the name for the next 13 years. She then made her debut on 23 November 2007 when she independently released her first extended play, Mermaid vs Sailor, which was distributed via her official Myspace profile. US independent label Neon Gold Records eventually release "Obsessions" as Diamandis' debut single, followed by her second extended play, The Crown Jewels, on 1 June 2009. Subsequently, she was signed by 679 Recordings (Note: A subdivision of Warner Music Group, the label was later renamed as 679 Artists.) and Atlantic Records, which led Diamandis to release The Family Jewels, her debut studio album on 15 February 2010. The record reached number five in the United Kingdom (Official Albums Chart), and was certified gold by both the British Phonographic Industry (BPI) and the Irish Recorded Music Association (IRMA). It was further promoted by five singles: "Mowgli's Road", "I Am Not a Robot", "Oh No!" and "Shampain", with "Hollywood" being her highest-peaking song from the album, landing at number 12 on the UK singles chart.

Diamandis, as Marina and the Diamonds, soon considered creating an alter-ego character which ultimately became her second studio album titled Electra Heart, released on 27 April 2012. After receiving mixed reviews from music critics, it topped the charts in the United Kingdom, as well as the Irish Albums Chart; soon after it was certified gold in both countries. In the United States, it peaked at number 31 on the Billboard 200 and was certified gold by the Recording Industry Association of America (RIAA). "Primadonna" became the lead single and remains her highest-charting single in the UK at number 11; the song is also certified silver by the BPI, and platinum by the Australian Recording Industry Association (ARIA), IFPI Denmark, and Recorded Music NZ. The album also spawned two more singles: "Power & Control" with "How to Be a Heartbreaker" becoming a platinum-certified song by the RIAA, alongside "Primadonna".

After a major breakthrough in music, Diamandis spent a couple of months in the US where she began writing more material for Froot, her third studio album under as Marina and the Diamonds. A boxed-set, containing six varicoloured 7-inch vinyl singles, was issued with a song being unveiled digitally every month until its release on 3 April 2015. The songs were "Froot", "Happy", "Forget", and "Blue". "I'm a Ruin" was also included and is the only single from the album to chart in her home country, peaking at number 169. Due to unauthorised Internet leaks, the record was released earlier on 13 March; it charted at number ten in the UK and reached number eight in the US, becoming Diamandis' first album to reach that country's top ten. She then took a break from music, but ultimately came back by dropping her "and the Diamonds" moniker to now releasing music under her first name. This led to the release of her fourth studio album, Love + Fear, on 26 April 2019. It reached number five and 28 in the UK and the US, respectively, with Diamandis seeing minor success with "Handmade Heaven", while the rest of the singles did not chart.

Diamandis continued on with Ancient Dreams in a Modern Land, her fifth studio album released on 11 June 2021. It was dubbed as her most personal record which involved feminism, misogyny, heartbreak, and racism, shown through "Man's World" and "Purge the Poison". It became her lowest-peaking album in the UK at number 17 and in the US at number 95. While touring, Diamandis announced on 22 May 2022 that she would end her fourteen-year long contract with Atlantic Records. Another hiatus took place mainly due to health concerns, but she returned to the public eye and self-released her fifth studio album, Princess of Power, on 6 June 2025 with a partnership with BMG Rights Management for distribution purposes. It debuted at number seven in the UK albums chart and she appeared at number 42 in the US, and landed at number two on the Top Dance Albums component chart.

== Studio albums ==
List of studio albums, with selected details, chart positions, sales figures and certifications
Title	Details	Peak chart positions										Sales	Certifications
Title	Details	UK	AUS	AUT	GER	IRE	NL	NZ	SCO	SWI	US	Sales	Certifications
The Family Jewels	Released: 15 February 2010; Label: 679, Atlantic; Formats: CD, digital download, LP, streaming	5	79	18	12	9	88	—	6	100	138	World: 300,000; UK: 195,358; US: 24,000	BPI: Platinum; IRMA: Gold
Electra Heart	Released: 27 April 2012; Label: 679, Atlantic; Formats: CD, digital download, LP, streaming	1	32	25	17	1	86	31	1	11	31	UK: 164,000; US: 150,000	BPI: Gold; IRMA: Gold; RIAA: Gold; RMNZ: Platinum
Froot	Released: 13 March 2015; Label: Neon Gold, Atlantic; Formats: Cassette, CD, digital download, LP, streaming	10	12	38	24	4	21	12	9	10	8	World: 150,000; US: 75,000	BPI: Silver
Love + Fear	Released: 26 April 2019; Label: Atlantic, Neon Gold; Formats: CD, digital download, LP, streaming	5	22	19	18	17	43	31	4	20	28		
Ancient Dreams in a Modern Land	Released: 11 June 2021; Label: Atlantic, Neon Gold; Formats: Cassette, CD, digital download, LP, streaming	17	38	29	43	26	98	40	12	21	92	UK: 3,412 (Note: First week album sales for Ancient Dreams in a Modern Land in the UK)	
Princess of Power	Released: 6 June 2025; Label: Queenie, BMG; Formats: CD, digital download, LP, streaming	7	69	15	14	30	13	28	6	14	42		
"—" denotes a recording that did not chart or was not released in that territory.

== Extended plays ==
List of extended plays, with selected details
Title	Details
Mermaid vs Sailor	Released: 23 November 2007; Label: Self-released; Formats: CD, digital download
The Crown Jewels	Released: 1 June 2009; Label: Neon Gold; Formats: 7-inch vinyl, CD, digital download, streaming
iTunes Live: London Festival '09	Released: 15 July 2009; Label: 679, Atlantic; Format: Digital download, streaming
The American Jewels	Released: 23 March 2010; Label: Chop Shop; Format: Digital download, streaming
iTunes Live: London Festival '10	Released: 26 July 2010; Label: 679, Atlantic; Format: Digital download, streaming
Froot Acoustic	Released: 8 June 2015; Label: Self-released; Format: Digital download
Love + Fear (Acoustic)	Released: 13 September 2019; Label: Atlantic; Format: Digital download, streaming

== Singles ==
=== As lead artist ===
List of singles as lead artist, with selected chart positions and certifications, showing year released and album name
Title	Year	Peak chart positions										Certifications	Album
Title	Year	UK	AUS	AUT	DEN	GER	IRE	NOR	NZ	SCO	US	Certifications	Album
"Obsessions"	2009	—	—	—	—	—	—	—	—	—	—		The Family Jewels
"Mowgli's Road" (Note: "Mowgli's Road" also appears on the B-side of "Obsessions" and The American Jewels.)	2009	—	—	—	—	—	—	—	—	—	—		The Family Jewels
"Hollywood"	2010	12	—	17	— (Note: "Hollywood" did not enter the Danish Singles Chart, but peaked at number 10 on the Danish Airplay chart.)	15	21	—	—	11	—	BPI: Silver	The Family Jewels
"I Am Not a Robot" (Note: "I Am Not a Robot" also appears on The Crown Jewels and The American Jewels.)	2010	26	—	—	—	—	—	6	—	25	—	BPI: Silver; RIAA: Gold	The Family Jewels
"Oh No!"	2010	38	—	—	—	—	—	—	—	33	—	BPI: Silver; RIAA: Gold; RMNZ: Gold	The Family Jewels
"Shampain"	2010	141	—	—	—	—	—	—	—	—	—		The Family Jewels
"Primadonna"	2012	11	21	3	12	18	3	—	4	9	—	BPI: Platinum; ARIA: Platinum; BVMI: Gold; IFPI AUT: Gold; IFPI DEN: Platinum; RIAA: Platinum; RMNZ: 2× Platinum	Electra Heart
"Power & Control"	2012	193	—	—	—	—	—	—	—	—	—		Electra Heart
"How to Be a Heartbreaker"	2012	88	—	—	18	—	21	—	—	73	— (Note: "How to Be a Heartbreaker" did not enter the US Billboard Hot 100 Singles chart, but peaked at number 42 on the US Pop Digital Songs chart.)	BPI: Silver; IFPI DEN: Platinum; RIAA: Platinum; RMNZ: Gold	Electra Heart
"Froot"	2014	— (Note: "Froot" did not enter the UK Singles Chart Top 100, but peaked at number 19 on the UK Physical Singles chart.)	—	—	—	—	—	—	—	—	—		Froot
"Happy"	2014	—	—	—	—	—	—	—	—	—	—		Froot
"I'm a Ruin"	2015	169	—	—	—	—	—	—	—	—	—		Froot
"Forget"	2015	—	—	—	—	—	—	—	—	—	—		Froot
"Blue"	2015	—	—	—	—	—	—	—	—	—	—		Froot
"Disconnect" (with Clean Bandit)	2017	— (Note: "Disconnect" did not enter the UK Singles Chart, but peaked at number 72 on the UK Singles Downloads Chart.)	—	—	—	—	—	—	—	67	— (Note: "Disconnect" did not enter the US Billboard Hot 100, but peaked at number 31 on the Billboard Hot Dance/Electronic Songs chart.)		Non-album single
"Handmade Heaven"	2019	— (Note: "Handmade Heaven" did not enter the UK Singles chart, but peaked at number 52 on the UK Singles Downloads chart.)	—	—	—	—	—	—	— (Note: "Handmade Heaven" did not enter the NZ Top 40 Singles chart, but peaked at number 25 on the NZ Hot Singles chart.)	46	—		Love + Fear
"Superstar"	2019	—	—	—	—	—	—	—	—	—	—		Love + Fear
"Orange Trees"	2019	—	—	—	—	—	—	—	—	—	—		Love + Fear
"To Be Human"	2019	—	—	—	—	—	—	—	—	—	—		Love + Fear
"Karma"	2019	—	—	—	—	—	—	—	—	—	—		Love + Fear
"About Love"	2020	—	—	—	—	—	—	—	—	—	—		To All the Boys: P.S. I Still Love You
"Man's World"	2020	— (Note: "Man's World" did not enter the UK Singles chart, but peaked at number 29 on the UK Singles Sales chart.)	—	—	—	—	—	—	— (Note: "Man's World" did not enter the NZ Top 40 Singles Chart, but peaked at number 36 on the NZ Hot Singles chart.)	—	—		Ancient Dreams in a Modern Land
"Purge the Poison"	2021	— (Note: "Purge the Poison" did not enter the UK Singles chart, but peaked at number 1 on the UK Vinyl Singles chart and number 3 on the UK Physical Singles chart. It also peaked at number 14 on the UK Singles Sales chart.)	—	—	—	—	—	—	—	*	—		Ancient Dreams in a Modern Land
"Ancient Dreams in a Modern Land"	2021	—	—	—	—	—	—	—	—	*	—		Ancient Dreams in a Modern Land
"Venus Fly Trap"	2021	— (Note: "Venus Fly Trap" did not enter the UK Singles Chart Top 100, but peaked at number 31 on the UK Singles Sales chart.)	—	—	—	—	—	—	—	*	— (Note: "Venus Fly Trap" did not enter the Billboard Hot 100 chart, but peaked at number 38 on the US Billboard Rock & Alternative Airplay chart.)		Ancient Dreams in a Modern Land
"Butterfly"	2025	— (Note: "Butterfly" did not enter the UK Singles Chart Top 100, but debuted at number 46 on the UK Singles Downloads chart, and at number 48 on the UK Singles Sales chart.)	—	—	—	—	—	—	— (Note: "Butterfly" did not enter the NZ Top 40 Singles chart, but peaked at number 19 on the NZ Hot Singles chart.)	*	—		Princess of Power
"Cupid's Girl"	2025	— (Note: "Cupid's Girl" did not enter the UK Singles Chart, but debuted at number 72 on the UK Singles Downloads Chart and at number 77 on the UK Singles Sales Chart, on 28 March 2025.)	—	—	—	—	—	—	— (Note: "Cupid's Girl" did not enter the NZ Top 40 Singles chart, but peaked at number 25 on the NZ Hot Singles chart.)	*	—		Princess of Power
"Cuntissimo"	2025	— (Note: "Cuntissimo" did not enter the UK Singles Chart, but debuted at number 95 on the UK Singles Downloads chart, on 18 April 2025.)	—	—	—	—	—	—	— (Note: "Cuntissimo" did not enter the NZ Top 40 Singles Chart, but peaked at number 24 on the NZ Hot Singles Chart.)	*	—		Princess of Power
"—" denotes a recording that did not chart or was not released in that territory. "*" denotes the chart is discontinued.

=== As featured artist ===
List of singles as featured artist, showing year released and album name
Title	Year	Peak chart positions										Certifications	Album
Title	Year	UK	CRO	GRE	HUN	ICE	IRE	NZ	SCO	SLO	US	Certifications	Album
"With a Little Help from My Friends" (as part of NHS Voices)	2018	89	—	—	—	—	—	—	26	—	—		Non-album single
"Baby" (Clean Bandit featuring Marina and Luis Fonsi)	2018	15	11	51	29	18	39	— (Note: "Baby" did not enter the NZ Top 40 Singles Chart, but peaked at number 20 on the NZ Hot Singles chart.)	6	11	— (Note: "Baby" did not enter the US Billboard Hot 100, but peaked at number 13 on the Billboard Hot Dance/Electronic Songs chart.)	BPI: Gold	What Is Love? Love + Fear
"—" denotes a recording that did not chart or was not released in that territory.

=== Promotional singles ===
List of promotional singles, with selected chart positions, showing year released and album name
Title	Year	Peak chart positions			Album
Title	Year	UK	IRE	SCO	Album
"The Family Jewels"	2010	—	—	—	The Family Jewels
"Radioactive"	2011	25	37	25	Electra Heart
"Electra Heart" (Note: "Electra Heart" appears as a bonus track from the Platinum Blonde reissue of Electra Heart.) (Betatraxx featuring Marina and the Diamonds)	2014	—	—	—	Non-album promotional single
"Immortal"	2015	—	—	—	Froot
"Gold"	2015	—	—	—	Froot
"I Love You but I Love Me More" (featuring Beach Bunny)	2021	—	—	*	Ancient Dreams in a Modern Land
"Highly Emotional People" (Le Sac remix)	2021	—	—	*	Ancient Dreams in a Modern Land
"Happy Loner"	2021	—	—	*	Ancient Dreams in a Modern Land
"—" denotes a recording that did not chart or was not released in that territory. "*" denotes the chart is discontinued.

== Other charted or certified songs ==
List of other charted songs, with selected chart positions and certifications, showing year released and album name
Title	Year	Peak chart positions				Certifications	Album
Title	Year	UK	GRE	LTU	NZ	Certifications	Album
"Numb"	2010	135	—	—	—		The Family Jewels
"Are You Satisfied?"	2010	—	—	—	—	BPI: Silver	The Family Jewels
"Bubblegum Bitch"	2012	—	98	89	—	BPI: Gold; RIAA: Platinum; RMNZ: Gold	Electra Heart
"Teen Idle"	2012	—	—	—	—	RIAA: Gold	Electra Heart
"Savages"	2015	— (Note: "Savages" did not enter the UK Singles Chart, but peaked at number 19 on the UK Physical Singles Chart and number 10 on the UK Vinyl Singles Chart.)	—	—	—		Froot
"Better Than That"	2015	— (Note: "Better Than That" did not enter the UK Singles Chart, but peaked at number 17 on the UK Physical Singles Chart and number 9 on the UK Vinyl Singles Chart.)	—	—	—		Froot
"I <3 You"	2025	—	—	—	— (Note: "I <3 You" did not enter the NZ Top 40 Singles Chart, but peaked at number 28 on the NZ Hot Singles chart.)		Princess of Power
"—" denotes a recording that did not chart or was not released in that territory.

== Guest appearances ==
List of non-single guest appearances, with other performing artists, showing year released and album name
Title	Year	Other artist(s)	Album	Ref.
"Starstrukk"	2010	—N/a	Radio 1's Live Lounge: Volume 5	
"If I Left the World"	2019	Gryffin and Model Child	Gravity	

== Special releases ==
List of special releases, with other performing artists, showing year released and selected details
Title	Year	Other artist(s)	Description
"Homewrecker"	2012	—N/a	Released as a free download on Diamandis' official website upon signing up to her mailing list
"E.V.O.L"	2013	—N/a	Released as a free download on SoundCloud for Valentine's Day on 14 February 2013
"Just Desserts"	2013	Charli XCX	Released as a free download on SoundCloud, appearing on both artists' pages on 1 May 2013

== Music videos ==
List of music videos, showing year released and director(s) (Note: Where applied, credits and personnel are to be found in the artist's YouTube account.)
Title	Year	Director(s)	Ref.
"Seventeen"	2008	Chris Lewis	
"Obsessions"	2008	Tim Brown	
"I Am Not a Robot"	2009	Rankin and Chris Cottam	
"Mowgli's Road"	2009	Chris Sweeney	
"Hollywood"	2009	Kinga Burza	
"Oh No!"	2010	Kinga Burza	
"Shampain"	2010	Kim Gehrig	
"Fear and Loathing"	2011	Casper Balslev	
"Radioactive"	2011	Casper Balslev	
"Primadonna"	2012	Casper Balslev	
"Power & Control"	2012	Casper Balslev	
"How to Be a Heartbreaker"	2012	Marc & Ish	
"The State of Dreaming"	2013	Thomas Knights	
"Lies"	2013	Casper Balslev	
"Electra Heart" (with Betatraxx)	2013	Margarita Louca	
"Froot"	2014	Chino Moya	
"Immortal"	2014	Not credited	
"I'm a Ruin"	2015	Markus Lundqvist	
"Forget"	2015	Markus Lundqvist	
"Blue"	2015	Charlotte Rutherford	
"Baby" (with Clean Bandit and Luis Fonsi)	2018	Not credited	
"Handmade Heaven"	2019	Sophie Muller	
"Orange Trees"	2019	Sophie Muller	
"To Be Human"	2019	Anna Patarakina	
"Man's World"	2020	Alexandra Gavillet	
"Purge the Poison"	2021	Weird Life Films	
"Venus Fly Trap"	2021	Weird Life Films	
"Happy Loner"	2022	Brendan Walter	
"Butterfly"	2025	Aerin Moreno	
"Cuntissimo"	2025	Olivia de Camps	
"I <3 You"	2025	Olivia de Camps	

== Footnotes ==
Chart positions and sales figues

Other explanatory notes
