= The Family Jewels Tour =

2010–11 concert tour by Marina and the Diamonds

- Tour by MARINA
- Associated album: The Family Jewels
- Start date: 26 January 2010
- End date: 4 December 2011
- Legs: 5
- No. of shows: 135

MARINA concert chronology
- The Family Jewels Tour (2010–11); The Lonely Hearts Club Tour (2012–13)

The Family Jewels Tour was the first major headlining concert tour by Welsh singer-songwriter Marina Diamandis, known professionally as MARINA (formerly known as Marina and the Diamonds) in support of her debut album, The Family Jewels. In December 2009, prior to the release of her album, she announced an eight-date concert tour for the United Kingdom in February 2010. Following the success of her British tour, with tickets selling out, Diamandis announced her second United Kingdom and Ireland tour, entitled The Gem Tour. Tour dates for the United States and mainland Europe, in countries such as France, Germany, the Netherlands and Switzerland, were shortly added. In May 2010, Diamandis announced sixteen dates for her third United Kingdom and Ireland tour in Autumn the following year. Marina announced on 14 October that her third headlining UK tour would be called The Burger Queen Tour.

Diamandis also performed at several music festivals in the United States (SXSW 2010 and "Lilith Fair 2010"), the United Kingdom ("The Great Escape 2010", "Radio 1's Big Weekend 2010", "Isle of Wight Festival 2010", "Glastonbury Festival 2010", "iTunes Festival 2010" and "The Secret Garden Party 2010"), Germany ("Hurricane Festival 2010" and "Southside Festival 2010"), Norway ("Øyafestivalen 2010"), Sweden ("Way Out West Festival 2010"), Finland ("Flow Festival 2010") and Belgium ("Pukkelpop Festival 2010").

Diamandis was originally scheduled to play several shows in the USA in early 2011 but these dates were cancelled in order for her to work on the recording of Electra Heart. In Summer 2011, she switched back-and-forth between headlining "The Family Jewels Tour" and serving as an opening act for Katy Perry on her "California Dreams Tour".

== Reception ==
Katy Ratican from Contact Music rated Marina and the Diamonds' Manchester concert on 21 February 2010 nine stars out of ten saying it "was impressively cohesive and Marina held the limelight with charisma and confidence". She also predicted that the "next time [Diamandis] plays Manchester, it will be to a sold out Academy 2 audience, with a top-selling album gracing the merchandising stand. Marina won't be playing to a few hundred people above a trendy bar in the foreseeable future." Joanne Dorken from MTV UK praised Diamandis' performance of "Obsessions" at London's Bush Hall on 23 February 2010 calling it the "highlight of the evening as Marina proved her vocal ability as well as showcasing her talent for playing live."

At the opening concert of her Gem Tour at The Glee Club in Birmingham on 12 May 2010, Zak Edwards from Gig Junkies said Diamandis "instantly captivated the crowd in a similar way to which Kate Bush and Toyah Willcox did in yesteryear." He concluded by saying: "In short, this was a great set by a really novel, unique and entertaining performer. If you get chance to see her, you really must."

== Opening acts ==
- Clock Opera (14—19 February 2010)
- Alan Pownall (21—23 February 2010)
- Samuel (14—15 March 2010)
- Spark (now known as Jessica Morgan) (12—31 May 2010)
- Jasmine Ash (6 July 2010)
- DJs Aaron and Nako (8 July 2010)
- Young the Giant (6 September 2010)
- CocknBullKid
- Hannah Yadi – (14 November 2010)
- Hollywood Kill
- Ra Ra Rasputin – 16 June 2011

== Setlist ==
Leg 1: United Kingdom (February 2010), Leg 2: North America (March 2010) and Leg 3: Europe (April 2010)
1. "Girls"
2. "Seventeen"
3. "The Outsider"
4. "I Am Not a Robot"
5. "Oh No!"
6. "Numb"
7. "Obsessions"
8. "Rootless"
9. "Hollywood"
10. "Shampain"
11. "Guilty" (only on 29 April 2010)

Encore

12. "Mowgli's Road"
Leg 3: The Gem Tour (May 2010)
1. "Girls"
2. "Seventeen"
3. "The Outsider"
4. "I Am Not a Robot"
5. "Oh No!"
6. "Numb"
7. "Obsessions"
8. "Rootless"
9. "Hollywood"
10. "Shampain"
11. "Guilty"

Encore

12. "Starstrukk"
13. "Are You Satisfied?" (latter part of the tour)
14. "Mowgli's Road"
Leg 4: The Burger Queen Tour
1. "The Family Jewels"
2. "The Outsider"
3. "Girls"
4. "Seventeen"
5. "Are You Satisfied?"
6. "Rootless"
7. "Hermit the Frog"
8. "I Am Not a Robot"
9. "Obsessions"
10. "Jealousy"
11. "Oh No!"
12. "Shampain"
13. "Mowgli's Road"
14. "Guilty"

Encore

15. "Numb"
16. "Hollywood"
Coldplay MEN Arena Support Setlist:
1. "Mowgli's Road"
2. "Living Dead"
3. "I Am Not a Robot"
4. "Obsessions"
5. "Starring Role"
6. "Are You Satisfied?"
7. "Hollywood"
8. "Fear and Loathing"

== Tour dates ==
List of 2010 concerts
Date	City	Country	Venue
26 January 2010	London	England	Dingwalls
29 January 2010	London	England	The Tabernacle
30 January 2010	Gateshead	England	The Sage Gateshead
5 February 2010	London	England	Relentless Garage
14 February 2010	Edinburgh	Scotland	HMV Picture House
15 February 2010	Norwich	England	Norwich Arts Centre
16 February 2010	Brighton	England	Audio Nightclub
17 February 2010	Nottingham	England	The Bodega Social Club
18 February 2010	Newcastle upon Tyne	England	Digital
19 February 2010	Glasgow	Scotland	Oran Mor
21 February 2010	Manchester	England	The Deaf Institute
22 February 2010	Bristol	England	The Cooler
23 February 2010	London	England	Bush Hall
4 March 2010	Copenhagen	Denmark	Ideal Bar
5 March 2010	Stockholm	Sweden	Södra Teatern
14 March 2010	New York City	United States	The Bellhouse
15 March 2010	New York City	United States	(Le) Poisson Rouge
18 March 2010	Austin	United States	South by Southwest
19 March 2010	Austin	United States	South by Southwest
20 March 2010	Austin	United States	South by Southwest
29 April 2010	Paris	France	Le Divan du Monde
12 May 2010	Birmingham	England	The Glee Club
13 May 2010	Bournemouth	England	The Old Fire Station
15 May 2010 ^{A}	Brighton	England	The Great Escape Festival
16 May 2010	Cardiff	Wales	Millennium Music Hall
18 May 2010	Norwich	England	The Waterfront
19 May 2010	London	England	Bloomsbury Ballroom
20 May 2010	London	England	Bloomsbury Ballroom
22 May 2010	Sheffield	England	The Leadmill
23 May 2010	Manchester	England	Manchester Academy
25 May 2010	Liverpool	England	The Masque
26 May 2010	Belfast	Northern Ireland	Mandela Hall
27 May 2010	Dublin	Ireland	Tripod
29 May 2010	Glasgow	Scotland	Queen Margaret Union
30 May 2010	Edinburgh	Scotland	Assembly Rooms
31 May 2010	Leeds	England	Leeds Met Stylus
3 June 2010	Hamburg	Germany	The Stage Club
4 June 2010	Berlin	Germany	Frannz Club
6 June 2010	Cologne	Germany	Die Werkstatt Köln
7 June 2010	Munich	Germany	59:1
8 June 2010	Zürich	Switzerland	Kaufleuten
11 June 2010 ^{B}	Newport	England	Isle of Wight Festival 2010
13 June 2010	Copenhagen	Denmark	Vega
15 June 2010	Brussels	Belgium	Le Botanique
16 June 2010	Amsterdam	Netherlands	Paradiso
18 June 2010 ^{C}	Scheeßel	Germany	Hurricane Festival
19 June 2010 ^{D}	Tuttlingen	Germany	Southside Festival
26 June 2010 ^{E}	Somerset	England	Glastonbury Festival 2010
6 July 2010	West Hollywood	United States	The Troubadour
8 July 2010	San Francisco	United States	Pop Scene
9 July 2010	Las Vegas	United States	Lilith Fair
10 July 2010	Los Angeles	United States	Lilith Fair
22 July 2010 ^{F}	London	England	iTunes Festival
23 July 2010	Huntingdon	England	Secret Garden Party
13 August 2010 ^{G}	Oslo	Norway	Øyafestivalen
14 August 2010 ^{H}	Gothenburg	Sweden	Way Out West Festival
15 August 2010 ^{I}	Helsinki	Finland	Flow Festival
19 August 2010 ^{J}	Vienna	Austria	FM4 Frequency Festival
20 August 2010 ^{K}	Hasselt	Belgium	Pukkelpop
21 August 2010 ^{L}	Biddinghuizen	Netherlands	Pukkelpop
27 August 2010 ^{M}	Reading	England	Reading Festival
29 August 2010 ^{N}	Leeds	England	Leeds Festival
1 September 2010	Boston	United States	Paradise
2 September 2010	New York City	United States	Webster Hall
3 September 2010	Philadelphia	United States	World Cafe
5 September 2010	Asbury Park	United States	Wonder Bar
6 September 2010	Washington, D.C.	United States	9:30 Club
8 September 2010	Toronto	Canada	The Opera House
9 September 2010	Chicago	United States	Lincoln Hall
10 September 2010	Minneapolis	United States	Triple Rock
13 September 2010	Seattle	United States	Crocodile Cafe
14 September 2010	Portland	United States	Doug Fir
15 September 2010	San Francisco	United States	The Independent
17 September 2010	Los Angeles	United States	El Rey Theatre
23 September 2010 ^{O}	Baden-Baden	Germany	SWR3 New Pop Festival
19 October 2010	Portsmouth	England	Pyramid Centre
20 October 2010	Norwich	England	University of East Anglia
21 October 2010	Eastbourne	England	Winter Garden
23 October 2010	Birmingham	England	Town Hall
24 October 2010	Oxford	England	Regal
25 October 2010	Bristol	England	Anson Rooms
27 October 2010	Dublin	Ireland	Vicar Street
28 October 2010	Cork	Ireland	Savoy Theatre
29 October 2010	Derry	Northern Ireland	Nerve Centre
31 October 2010	Manchester	England	The Ritz
1 November 2010	Glasgow	Scotland	Fruit Market
2 November 2010	Edinburgh	Scotland	Picture House
4 November 2010	Newcastle upon Tyne	England	Northumbria University
5 November 2010	Leeds	England	University of Leeds
7 November 2010	Nottingham	England	Nottingham Trent University
8 November 2010	London	England	The Roundhouse
9 November 2010	London	England	London Forum
11 November 2010	Coventry	England	The Copper Rooms
12 November 2010	Cardiff	Wales	Coal Exchange
14 November 2010	Bath	England	Pavilion
15 November 2010	Brighton	England	Corn Exchange
18 November 2010	Cologne	Germany	Gloria
19 November 2010	Berlin	Germany	Postbahnhof
20 November 2010	Hamburg	Germany	Uebel & Gefährlich
22 November 2010	Stockholm	Sweden	Nalen
23 November 2010	Gothenburg	Sweden	Pustervik
25 November 2010	Helsinki	Finland	Tavastia
26 November 2010	Aarhus	Denmark	Vox
28 November 2010	Amsterdam	Netherlands	Melkweg
29 November 2010	Ghent	Belgium	Vooruit
30 November 2010	Paris	France	Alhambra
3 December 2010	Bern	Switzerland	Bierhubeli
4 December 2010	Vienna	Austria	Porgy & Bess
5 December 2010	Hannover	Germany	Faust
28 December 2010	Melbourne	Australia	Hi-Fi Bar & Ballroom
29 December 2010	Lorne	Australia	Falls Festival
30 December 2010	Marrickville	Australia	The Factory Theatre

List of 2011 concerts
Date	City	Country	Venue
1 January 2011	Sydney	Australia	Field Day Festival
3 January 2011	Busselton	Australia	Southbound Festival
7 April 2011	Las Vegas	United States	Cosmopolitan of Las Vegas
8 April 2011	Las Vegas	United States	Cosmopolitan of Las Vegas
9 April 2011	Las Vegas	United States	Cosmopolitan of Las Vegas
11 April 2011	Austin	United States	Antone's Nightclub
12 April 2011	Houston	United States	Fitzgerald's
13 April 2011	Dallas	United States	Granada Theatre
15 April 2011	Indio	United States	Coachella Valley Music and Arts Festival
30 April 2011	Bergen	Norway	Bergen International Festival
16 June 2011	Philadelphia	United States	Theatre of the Living Arts
17 June 2011	Washington, D.C.	United States	9:30 Club
18 June 2011	Asbury Park	United States	Stone Pony
20 June 2011	Boston	United States	Paradise Rock Club
21 June 2011	New York	United States	Webster Hall
23 July 2011	Moscow	Russia	Afisha Picnic
29 July 2011	Lucerne	Switzerland	Blue Balls Festival
30 July 2011	Östersund	Sweden	Storsjöyran
13 August 2011	Piešťany	Slovakia	Grape music festival
14 August 2011	Budapest	Hungary	Sziget Festival
19 August 2011	Paredes de Coura	Portugal	Paredes de Coura Festival
23 November 2011	London	England	Church of St John-at-Hackney

- A this concert was a part of "The Great Escape Festival 2010"
- B this concert was a part of "Isle of Wight Festival 2010"
- C this concert was a part of "Hurricane Festival 2010"
- D this concert was a part of "Southside Festival 2010"
- E this concert was a part of "Glastonbury Festival 2010"
- F this concert was a part of "iTunes Festival 2010"
- G this concert was a part of "Øyafestivalen"
- H this concert was a part of "Way Out West Festival"
- I this concert was a part of "Flow Festival 2010"
- J this concert was a part of "FM4 Frequency Festival"
- K this concert was a part of "Pukkelpop"
- L this concert was a part of "Pukkelpop"
- M this concert was a part of "Reading Festival"
- N this concert was a part of "Leeds Festival"
- O this concert was a part of "SWR3 New Pop Festival"

== Box office score data ==
Venue	City	Tickets Sold / Available	Gross Revenue
Tabernacle	London	450 / 450 (100%)	$7,286
9:30 Club	Washington DC	718 / 1,200 (60%)	$10,770
El Rey Theatre	Los Angeles	771 / 771 (100%)	$15,420
Antone's	Austin	486 / 700 (69%)	$6,464
9:30 Club	Washington DC	780/ 1,200 (65%)	$15,600
