= Hermit the Frog =

Song by Marina Diamandis

from the album The Family Jewels
- Released: February 15, 2010
- Genre: Cabaret, indie pop, art pop, dark pop, alternative
- Label: 679, Atlantic Records
- Songwriter: Marina Diamandis
- Producers: Marina Diamandis, Liam Howe

"Hermit the Frog" is presented as track 9 of Marina's debut album, The Family Jewels. The song was written entirely by Marina herself, in which she also takes some part in the production, along with Liam Howe, who's also responsible for the production of many other songs on the same album. It was released amongst the whole record on February 15, 2010.

The title of the track is a reference to the famous character from The Muppet Show called Kermit the Frog.

== Background ==
Marina first published the song on MySpace in 2007, with the first available version being published on June 3. Between the dates of September 17-27, the same version was seen again, this time, on YouTube. with a "newer" version released on November 8 of the same year. Aside from being a track of her debut album, it was also featured as track 3 of Marina's debut Extended Play called Mermaid vs Sailor. Diamandis was asked on an interview with LAist "You've said that you like to treat your voice as an instrument. Which is one moment on the album where you really pushed yourself and felt proud of how it turned out?." To what Marina responded

"I would probably say "Hermit the Frog" because it's definitely the most experimental song. Though to be honest, when I say experimental, I wasn't aware of that fact when I was doing it. I just wanted to put a lot of character and humor into the song, and that's the only way I knew how to do it."

Marina shares on a 2021 interview with People Magazine on a reflection about her past albums that "It feels like listening to another person... It's other songs like 'Are You Satisfied?' and 'Hermit the Frog,' where I'm like 'What the fuck?' They were so mad." Diamandis also adds that these songs were "baby" her. She also highlighted on the interview that this track was the first one to ever be written, followed by Seventeen, Obsessions, Are You Satisfied? and Mowgli's Road.

== Critical reception ==
Gareth O'Malley of DIY Magazine on a 2024 review of The Family Jewels shares that Hermit the Frog is "where her quirky side comes to the fore." Also adding that the tracks produces "mixed results that no amount of pop savvy can improve." The Indie Scene's favorite song off of the record is none other than Hermit the Frog, describing it as "a slightly bizarre song that I can only assume is about a relationship, the loss of virginity, or is complete gibberish." However, not every opinion can be high energy. Gareth James of Clash Music calls the track one of those where "things sometimes feel a little forced." Not only stopping there, also calling it "hideously titled", along with Shampain.

== Credits and personnel ==
Credits adapted from the liner notes of The Family Jewels

=== Personnel ===
- Marina Diamandis - vocals
- Lucy Shaw - string arrangements, double bass
- Liam Howe - programming, Mellotron, Philicorda, mandolin, recorders
- Oli Langford - viola
- Anna Phoebe - violin
- Rebekah Allan- violin
- Chris Worsey - cello
- David Westlake - drums

=== Technical ===
- Liam Howe - production, mixing
- Richard Wilkinson - engineering
- Dougal Lott - engineering assistant
- Marina Diamandis - additional production
- Guy Davie - mastering
