= Hanns Dieter Hüsch =

German author, cabaret artist, actor, songwriter and radio commentator

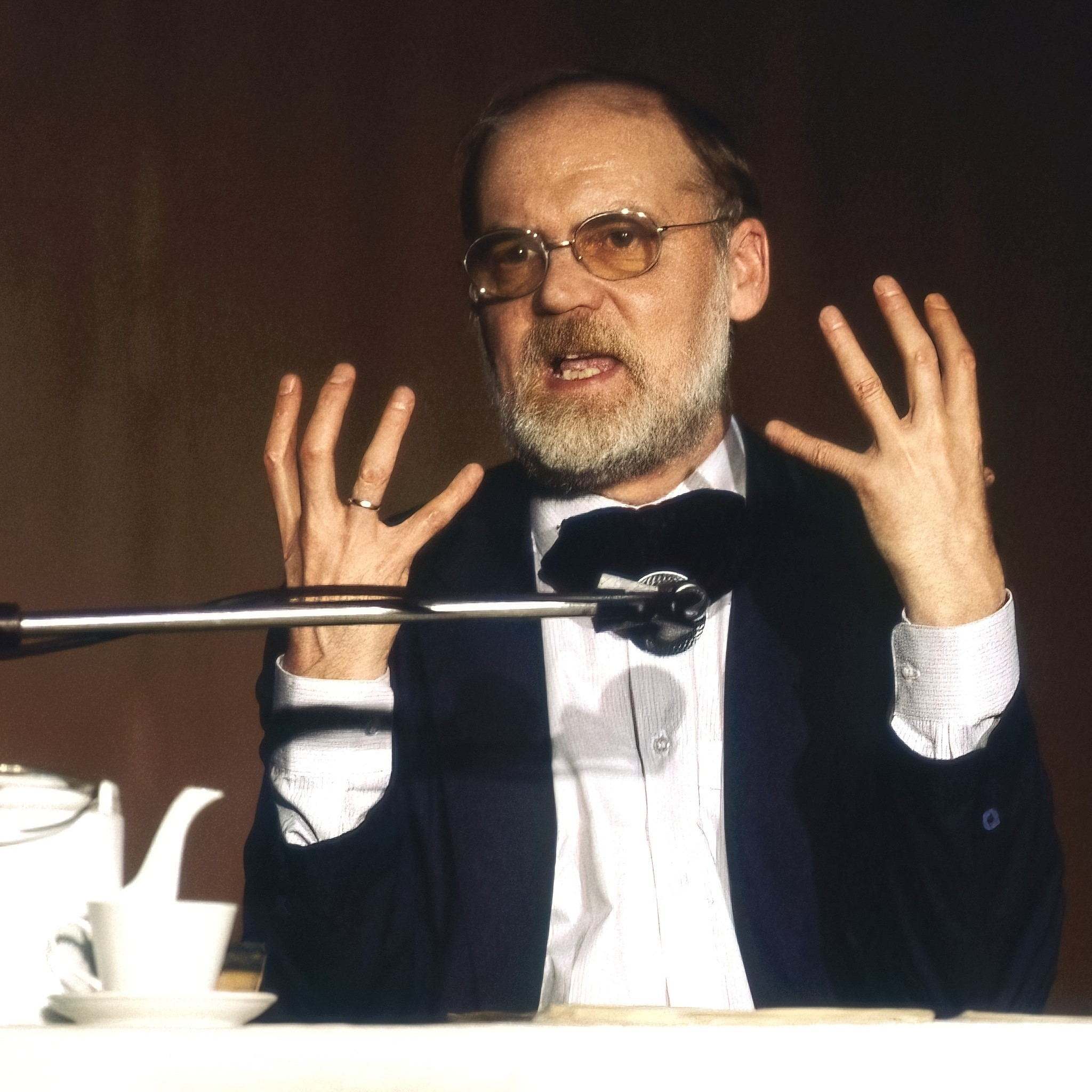
Hanns Dieter Hüsch during a performance in the early 1980s

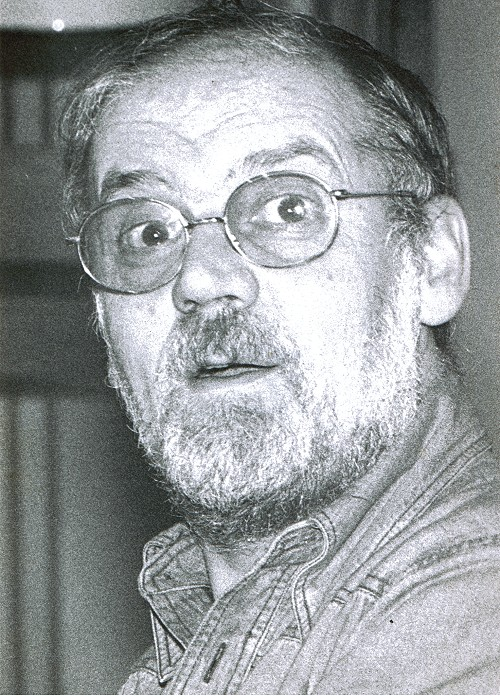
Hanns Dieter Hüsch

Hanns Dieter Hüsch (6 May 1925, in Moers – 6 December 2005, in Windeck-Werfen) was a German author, cabaret artist, actor, songwriter and radio commentator.

With a working life of more than 53 years on the German cabaret stage and 70 of his own programmes, he was one of the most productive and successful representatives of literary cabaret in Germany in the 20th century.

== Life and work ==
Hüsch grew up in the Niederrhein area near the Netherlands and suffered from metatarsus adductus until he was 11 years old. Because he could not play with other children, he became a loner and began to write. When he was 22, Hüsch began to study in Mainz, "but I did not study, I wrote cabaret pieces". In 1949, Hüsch married Marianne and they had a daughter named Anna. At the time, they did not earn enough money to feed the young family, and Hüsch moved to Stuttgart, where he obtained employment at the local radio station. He worked under the direction of Guy Walter as author, songwriter and radio commentator. In 1955 Hanns Dieter Hüsch started his first cabaret ensemble, 'Arche nova', which became famous in southern Germany and Switzerland.

From 1965 on, Hüsch released phonograph records with literary cabaret pieces, chansons and poems – he sold more than 50 albums until his death. In 1967, he joined the left-wing German student movement and performed in Berlin on Burg Waldeck. But some elements of the student movement did not like Hüsch's non-violent attitude. They heckled his performances from June 1968 until August 1969 and "it was just as if your comrades told you that you are not good enough for the fight and that you have to give it up", said Hüsch. He was disappointed and hurt by their actions against his art, decided not to perform in Germany for years, and moved to Switzerland.

In 1972, he returned to German cabaret stages and subsequently became one of the most productive and successful representatives of literary cabaret in Germany, with more than 200 performances every year. In 1985, his wife died, and Hüsch wrote his most successful programme ever: "Und sie bewegt mich doch"/"And yet she moves me". In 1988 Hüsch left Mainz and went to Cologne, where he met his second wife Christiane. In 1996 Hüsch contracted lung cancer, caused by his cigarette smoking, but survived. Until the end of 2000, he toured with his farewell programme "Wir sehen uns wieder" ("We will meet again") in Germany, Austria and Switzerland. In 2001, a stroke ended his plan to play King Lear at the Staatstheater Dresden. Complications resulting from the stroke and cancer confined him to his home in Windeck near Cologne, where he was nursed by Christiane. Hanns Dieter Hüsch died 6 months after his 80th birthday.

It is said that more than 3.5 million people have seen Hanns Dieter Hüsch's live performances from 1947 to 2000. He received the Bundesverdienstkreuz and, twice, the German Cabaret award "Deutscher Kleinkunstpreis"; he also received honorary citizenship of Moers and Mainz, the North Rhine-Westphalia culture prize, the 1995 Kassel Literary Prize, and the culture prize of Rhineland-Palatinate, as well as other honors. Since the end of the 1960s, he began using a Philicorda organ on stage instead of a piano or grand piano which has since become his musical trademark.
