= Mermaid vs Sailor =

EP by Marina and the Diamonds
- Released: 23 November 2007
- Recorded: 2007
- Length: 20:12
- Label: Self-released
- Producers: Marina and the Diamonds

Marina and the Diamonds chronology
Mermaid vs Sailor (2007)	The Family Jewels (2010)

Mermaid vs Sailor is the first extended play by Welsh singer-songwriter Marina Diamandis, released under the stage name Marina and the Diamonds. The EP was independently released on 23 November 2007 and distributed via her official profile on Myspace. It contains six demos recorded by Diamandis at her home and approximately 80 CD-R copies were created. She also distributed the EP to several record labels with the hope that she would secure a contract; she ultimately was signed to 679 Recordings in 2008. The EP is a collection of indie pop tracks that heavily utilise keyboards in their production.

Diamandis wrote and produced all of the six songs that appear on the EP by herself using the computer software program GarageBand. Several of these songs later appeared on other projects by Diamandis, such as her following release The Crown Jewels EP (2009) and debut studio album The Family Jewels (2010). Retrospectively, Mermaid vs Sailor received generally positive reviews from music critics, who felt it was indicative of Diamandis' potential as an artist.

== Background and release ==
Marina and the Diamonds launched her career as a musician at 18 years old, when she began auditioning for roles in London-based musicals. Despite attending several auditions, she was unable to secure roles and began self-composing and producing demos using the digital audio workstation GarageBand on her personal laptop computer instead. Around this time, she began to learn how to properly play the keyboard, an instrument commonly featured throughout Mermaid vs Sailor. After completing several recordings, she compiled them into a demo tape and submitted it to several major record labels for consideration.

Mermaid vs Sailor was released on 23 November 2007 through Diamandis' official Myspace profile page. It could be purchased digitally as a paid download or as a handmade CD-R self-distributed by Diamandis. According to her, she produced and packaged approximately 70 physical copies of the EP. The disc came inside a transparent sleeve lined with stickers, hard candy, and ribbon. Diamandis collected payments of the release through the use of PayPal transactions. Due to the limited quantity distribution of the EP, she later suggested that fans would have to resort to using eBay in order to obtain a copy. Unofficial record label Story Tailors productions later created a bootleg version of the release on 10" vinyl in November 2009, limited to just 35 copies.

During her time spent on Myspace, Diamandis referred to herself in her biography section as "an indie artist with pop goals". Her inspiration, musically, at this point of her career drew from artists like Gwen Stefani and Britney Spears. However, she distinguished herself from these artists by applying a unique "voice and melodic style" to glam pop and ballad-style songs. She was also influenced by outsider musician Daniel Johnston, which inspired Diamandis to compose her own music.

== Songs and lyrics ==
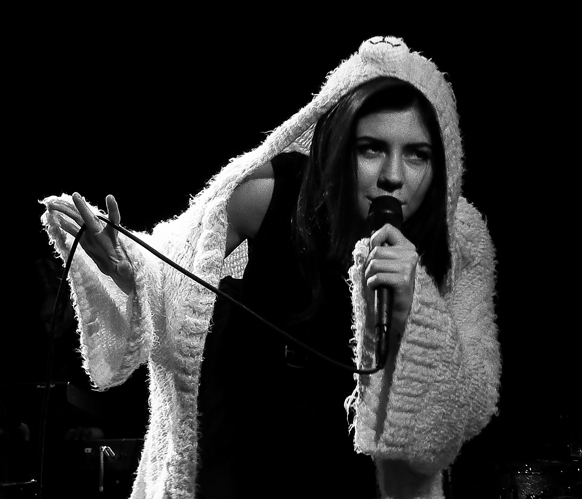
Marina and the Diamonds performing live in 2010.

In total, Mermaid vs Sailor contains six songs written, produced, and recorded by Diamandis. Three of the songs on the EP were eventually reworked on later releases by the artist. Re-recorded versions of "Seventeen" and "Hermit the Frog" both appear on her debut studio album, The Family Jewels (2010), although the former song is only included as a bonus track on the Japan deluxe and United States standard editions. Both re-released versions of the songs received additional production from English musician Liam Howe. "Simplify", the EP's fifth track, was also re-recorded, this time for inclusion on The Crown Jewels EP (2009) with production credited to Martin Craft.

Mermaid vs Sailor opens with "Seventeen", a song that tells the story of an undisclosed event that occurred in Diamandis' life when she was 17 years old. "Horror Pop" follows, a song that makes several references to horoscopes and astrological signs. Third track "Hermit the Frog" is written in D minor and is a play on words of the Muppets character Kermit the Frog. "Daddy Was a Sailor" and "Simplify" are the EP's fourth and fifth tracks, respectively. The former song was described by Diamandis as her favourite song that uses an Argos keyboard, while the latter received a lyrical change prior to release, switching the line "Monopoly is underrated" out for "board games are underrated". The release closes with sixth track "Plastic Rainbow", which is about her personal experience of "being a fake" for two years and "moving onto what I really was which was myself." In a 2015 interview with Rolling Stone, Diamandis revealed that "Plastic Rainbow" was the first song she had ever written at around the age of 19 or 20, which gave her a feeling of wanting to become a songwriter.

== Critical reception and impact ==
Mermaid vs Sailor received favourable reviews from music critics. Rick Fulton from the Daily Record suggested that the EP generated extensive exposure for Diamandis as an artist and felt it helped to establish her as "yet another MySpace success story". Angie Bhandal, writing for Music Bloggery, considered the EP a charming effort that "instantly [revealed] something about her music that record labels wanted a piece of"; further in her review, she acknowledged that her overall reaction to the EP was "cringe" but said that later releases such as The Family Jewels managed to reveal the same quirky sound of Mermaid vs Sailor.

In 2008, a year after the release of the EP, Diamandis was signed during a bidding war to London-based 679 Recordings, a subdivision of the Warner Music Group record label. The popularity of her Myspace profile and Mermaid vs Sailor led to her discovery by Neon Gold Records head Derek Davies, who worked with Diamandis for a period of six months. He also booked her as the opening act for select shows with Australian singer Gotye.

== Track listing ==
All tracks written and produced by Marina and the Diamonds.

No.	Title	Length
1.	"Seventeen"	2:40
2.	"Horror Pop"	3:57
3.	"Hermit the Frog"	3:39
4.	"Daddy Was a Sailor"	3:15
5.	"Simplify"	2:34
6.	"Plastic Rainbow"	4:07
Total length:		20:12

== Release history ==
Release dates and formats for Mermaid vs Sailor
Region	Date	Format(s)	Label	Ref.
Various	23 November 2007	CD-R; digital download; streaming	Self-released	
