= I Am Not a Robot =

2010 single by Marina Diamandis

Single by Marina and the Diamonds

from the album The Family Jewels
- Released: 23 April 2010
- Recorded: 2008–2009
- Studio: The Ivory Tower; Konk, London
- Genre: Pop; avant-garde; glam pop
- Length: 3:32
- Label: 679
- Songwriter: Marina Diamandis
- Producer: Liam Howe

Marina and the Diamonds singles chronology
"Hollywood" (2010)	"I Am Not a Robot" (2010)	"Oh No!" (2010)

Music video
- "I Am Not a Robot" on YouTube

"I Am Not a Robot" is a song by Welsh singer Marina Diamandis, released under the stage name Marina and the Diamonds, from her debut studio album, The Family Jewels (2010). It was released digitally on 23 April 2010 and physically on 26 April 2010 as the album's third single. The track originally appeared on Diamandis's second extended play, The Crown Jewels EP (2009). The single was added to BBC Radio 1's A List in April 2010. A choral version of "I Am Not a Robot" was used in an advertisement for British healthcare provider Bupa in March 2011. Additionally, the song was heavily sampled by American rapper Hoodie Allen for his debut single "You Are Not a Robot" (2010).

== Background and composition ==
"I Am Not a Robot" is a pop, avant-garde, and glam pop song. In an interview with Wales Online, Diamandis stated, "['I Am Not a Robot'] was me singing to myself. It's me saying, stop being so ridiculous, you can't let having a fear of failing hold you back and you're just one person. It's connected with a lot of people. I knew that would happen when I was writing it. I had a funny feeling."

Diamandis said that she decided to release "I Am Not a Robot" as a single because "people seem to empathize and relate with the song, regardless of gender or age."

== Commercial performance ==
"I Am Not a Robot" debuted at number 74 on the UK Singles Chart, reaching its peak position of number 26 two weeks later. In total, the single spent seven weeks on the chart. As of February 2019, the song had sold 132,000 units in the United Kingdom.

On 3 April 2019, "I Am Not a Robot" was certified gold by the Recording Industry Association of America (RIAA) for shipments in excess of 500,000 units. It was Diamandis's third single to achieve this feat, following "Primadonna" and "How to Be a Heartbreaker", which were both certified gold on 15 May 2017.

== Critical reception ==
Gareth James from Clash named "I Am Not a Robot" "one of 2010's best singles", calling it "an infectious pop track featuring a unique vocal with more fluctuations than Florence sat on a washing machine." Alexis Petridis from The Guardian commented that "the lovely delicacy of 'I Am Not a Robot''s tune is easy to miss when there's a woman doing Dalek voices over the top of it. Such are the dangers of trying a little too hard." John Murphy from musicOMH praised the song saying it "shows a pleasing touch of vulnerability which works very well." Diamandis was also praised following a performance of the song on BBC Radio 1's Live Lounge on 23 April 2010.

== Music video ==
Diamandis in the music video for "I Am Not a Robot"

The music video for "I Am Not a Robot" was directed by Rankin & Chris Cottam and was released onto YouTube on 24 June 2009. The music video features Diamandis in five scenes: one with her covered in black oil and glitter, one made-up in black, green and pink body paint, one with diamond lips and eyelids, one with the green, pink, and black body paint smeared, and lastly just her as her normal self. Each sequence shows Diamandis in the centre of the screen with either a starry, grey, white or black background whilst singing to the camera. Diamandis explained in an interview on Scott Mills's BBC Radio 1 show that the black oil reacted to her skin and it took forty minutes to rub off. It also took her eighteen hours to get all of her make-up done for the video.

An alternative version of the video was shot on Los Angeles' Hollywood Boulevard and released on 14 April 2010. The music video starts with an unfocused view of headlights on a road. It zooms out to show Diamandis with white painted hair, and a white dress with one feathered sleeve, on the Hollywood Walk of Fame. Diamandis walks down the street while singing the song, and blurred-face bystanders around her make way, stare, or go their way. Near the end, the camera shows Diamandis's white heels and white paint on her legs. At the end, Diamandis laughs, the camera follows her, and reveals the camera crew and the window of a shop.

== Track listings ==
- UK CD
1. "I Am Not a Robot" – 3:35
2. "I Am Not a Robot" (Doorly remix) – 5:20
- UK digital EP
1. "I Am Not a Robot" – 3:32
2. "I Am Not a Robot" (Flex'd rework – Passion Pit remix) – 4:47
3. "I Am Not a Robot" (Clock Opera remix) – 4:35
4. "I Am Not a Robot" (Doorly remix) – 5:18
5. "I Am Not a Robot" (acoustic) – 3:48
- UK 7-inch
  - A. "I Am Not a Robot" – 3:35
  - B. "I Am Not a Robot Flex'd Rework" (Passion Pit remix) – 4:54
- UK limited-edition 7-inch in autographed envelope sleeve
  - A. "I Am Not a Robot" – 3:35
  - B. "I Am Not a Robot" (Clock Opera remix) – 4:39

== Credits and personnel ==
Credits adapted from the liner notes of The Family Jewels.

=== Recording and management ===
- Recorded at The Ivory Tower and Konk Studios, London
- Mixed at The Ivory Tower
- Mastered at Electric Mastering, London
- Published by Warner Chappell Music Publishing Ltd

=== Personnel ===
- Marina Diamandis – vocals, piano, glockenspiel
- Liam Howe – production, bass, Mellotron, Philicorda, synths, mixing, programming
- Richard Wilkinson – engineering
- Dougal Lott – engineering assistance
- Lucy Shaw – string arrangements, double bass
- Alison Dods – violin
- Calina de la Mere – violin
- Rachel Robson – viola
- Chris Allan – cello
- Steve Durham – drums
- Guy Davie – mastering

== Charts ==
=== Weekly charts ===
Weekly chart performance for "I Am Not a Robot"
Chart (2010–2013)	Peak position
Belgium (Ultratip Bubbling Under Flanders)	21
Belgium (Ultratip Bubbling Under Wallonia)	8
Finland Download (Latauslista)	28
Norway (VG-lista)	6
Scottish Singles Sales (Official Charts)	25
Sweden (Sverigetopplistan)	11
UK Singles (Official Charts)	26

=== Year-end charts ===
Year-end chart performance for "I Am Not a Robot"
Chart (2010)	Position
Sweden (Sverigetopplistan)	86

== Certifications ==
Certifications for "I Am Not a Robot"
Region	Certification	Certified units/sales
United Kingdom (BPI)	Silver	200,000^{‡}
United States (RIAA)	Gold	500,000^{‡}
^{‡} Sales+streaming figures based on certification alone.
