= The Family Jewels (album) =

Studio album by Marina and the Diamonds
- Released: 15 February 2010
- Recorded: 2007–2009
- Studios: The Ivory Tower (Note: Tracks 1–3, 5, 6, 8, 9 and 12); Konk (Note: Tracks 1–3, 5, 6, 9 and 12); Eleven (Note: Tracks 4 and 11); Sarm 2 (Note: Tracks 7 and 13) (London); Biffco (Brighton) (Note: Tracks 1, 2, 7 and 13); Kingsize Soundlabs (Los Angeles) (Note: Track 10)
- Genres: Alternative pop; bubblegum-punk; electropop; synth-pop; pop rock
- Length: 45:35
- Labels: 679; Atlantic
- Producers: Marina Diamandis; Pascal Gabriel; Liam Howe; Ash Howes; Greg Kurstin; Richard "Biff" Stannard; Starsmith

Marina and the Diamonds chronology
Mermaid vs Sailor (2007)	The Family Jewels (2010)	Electra Heart (2012)

Singles from The Family Jewels
- 1. "Obsessions" Released: 16 February 2009; 2. "Mowgli's Road" Released: 16 February 2009; 3. "Hollywood" Released: 1 February 2010; 4. "I Am Not a Robot" Released: 23 April 2010; 5. "Oh No!" Released: 2 August 2010; 6. "Shampain" Released: 11 October 2010

The Family Jewels is the debut studio album by the Welsh singer and songwriter Marina Diamandis, released under the stage name Marina and the Diamonds. It was released on 15 February 2010 by 679 Recordings and Atlantic Records. Diamandis collaborated with several producers including Pascal Gabriel, Liam Howe, Greg Kurstin, Richard "Biff" Stannard, and Starsmith during its recording. She identifies the lyrical themes as "the seduction of commercialism, modern social values, family, and female sexuality."

Music critics gave The Family Jewels fairly positive reviews, with the vocal delivery dividing opinions. The record debuted at number five on the UK Albums Chart with first-week sales of 27,618 copies. The album was eventually certified Platinum by the British Phonographic Industry (BPI). The Family Jewels performed moderately on international record charts; it peaked at number 138 on the Billboard 200 in the United States, selling 4,000 copies its first week.

The Family Jewels was supported by five singles, all of which were supplemented by accompanying music videos. "Mowgli's Road" was released on 13 November 2009, although "Hollywood" became its first charting track after reaching number 12 on the UK Singles Chart. Follow-up singles "I Am Not a Robot", "Oh No!" and "Shampain" respectively peaked at numbers 26, 38, and 141 in the United Kingdom. The record was additionally promoted by Diamandis' headlining the Family Jewels Tour, which visited Australia, Europe and North America from January 2010 through December 2011.

== Background ==
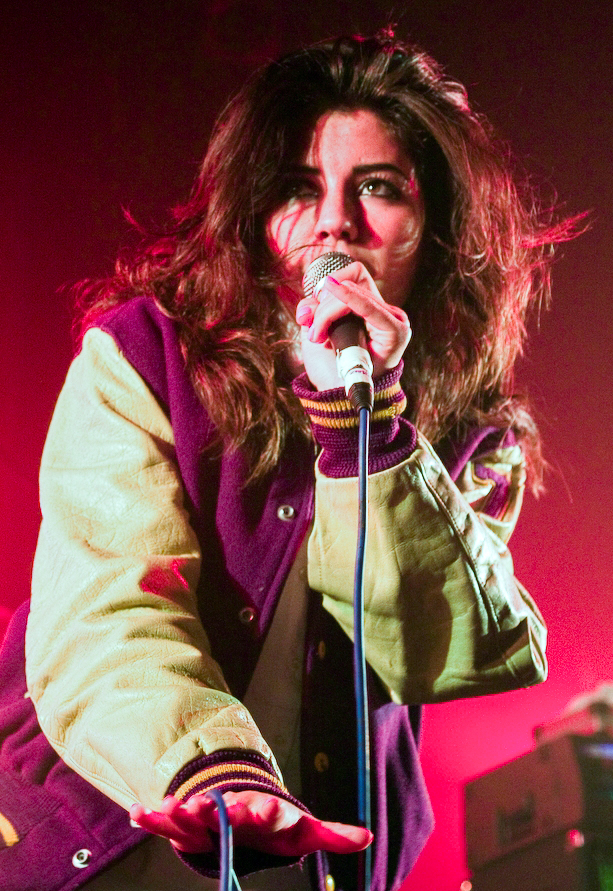
Diamandis performing on the NME Radar Tour, October 2009

Born and raised in South East Wales, Diamandis moved to London at the age of 18 to study music, despite not having a musical background. After dropping out of four institutions and failing in auditions, she began composing her own music. After the success of her Myspace-released EP Mermaid vs Sailor in 2007, she was signed by Neon Gold Records the following year and by 679 Artists in October 2008. In 2009, after playing at a variety of festivals including Glastonbury in the summer, she ranked in second place in the BBC's Sound of 2010 and was one of the three nominees for the Critics' Choice Award at the 2010 Brit Awards. In a 2012 interview with Between the Lines, Diamandis said that the album's title came from a slang term for testes, but she had been too coy to admit it before.

== Composition ==
The Family Jewels is mainly an alternative pop, bubblegum-punk, electropop, synth-pop, and pop rock record with influences of 1980s dance music and late-1990s female rock. Diamandis explained that the album is "a body of work largely inspired by the seduction of commercialism, modern social values, family and female sexuality", intended to be "enjoyed and consumed as a story and theory that encourages people to question themselves".

"I think it's a really diverse album stylistically speaking because I'm such a flexible writer. So there's a lot of pop on it, but there's kind of a lot of leftfield experimental stuff as well. It's basically an album about what not to be."

— Diamandis, explaining the album's musical style to Clash, January 2010

In a review for Q, writer Hugh Montgomery noted genres such as disco ("Shampain"), bubblegum punk ("Girls") and cabaret ("Hermit the Frog"). The opening track, "Are You Satisfied?", ponders the meaning of a fulfilling life; a writer for The Line of Best Fit likened it to the thinking of Danish existentialist philosopher Søren Kierkegaard. In a January 2010 interview with The Daily Telegraph, Diamandis admitted that she "cringes" at the lyrics of the song "Girls", which "could be seen as a bit misogynistic", including the lines "Girls they never befriend me/'Cause I fall asleep when they speak/Of all the calories they eat"; she clarified that the lyrics concerned her own psychological problems with weight. A Neon Gold press release for a limited double A-side of "Obsessions" and "Mowgli's Road" described the former as a "bold and ambitious ... master work" and the latter as a "a high intensity, left field pop smash".

Diamandis claimed that she made producer Liam Howe take 486 vocal takes for "The Outsider". "Hollywood" takes inspiration from Diamandis' previous obsession with American celebrity culture, while in "I Am Not a Robot", her favourite track from the album, she sings to tell herself to accept imperfection, with lines such as "you've been acting awful tough lately, smoking a lot of cigarettes lately ... don't be so pathetic"; she expected audiences to be able to relate to the song. "Numb" is an orchestral pop song that reflects on the dedication and sacrifice needed during her early years in London; "Oh No!" and "Are You Satisfied?" have similar lyrical themes. "Oh No!" was a late addition to the track listing, causing some reviews of the album to not include it. The album had initially been scheduled for release in October 2009, and was delayed by Diamandis' self-confessed perfectionism.

== Release and promotion ==
=== Music videos ===
In 2008, Diamandis filmed videos for the tracks "Seventeen" and "Obsessions". The following year, photographer Rankin directed the accompaniment for "I Am Not a Robot", which used much body glitter. The video for "Mowgli's Road" featured Diamandis and two dancers, with puppeteers standing in front of them to give them the impression of having concertina limbs; it was shot over 17 hours. Polish artist Kinga Burza shot the "classic pop video" for "Hollywood", with the aim to "make her audiences fall in love her even more, perhaps crave a little popcorn and feel inspired to dress up for fun". Burza also filmed the video for "Oh No!", with an aesthetic based on "zany neon" MTV graphics and the fame-hungry lyrics. The video to "Shampain" made an homage to Michael Jackson's Thriller. Dan Knight made a video for Chilly Gonzales' "stripped-down" remix of "Hollywood" that was intended to be the opposite of Burza's official video. In the video, Gonzales and Diamandis perform on a 1980s Estonian music show complete with subtitles.

=== Singles ===
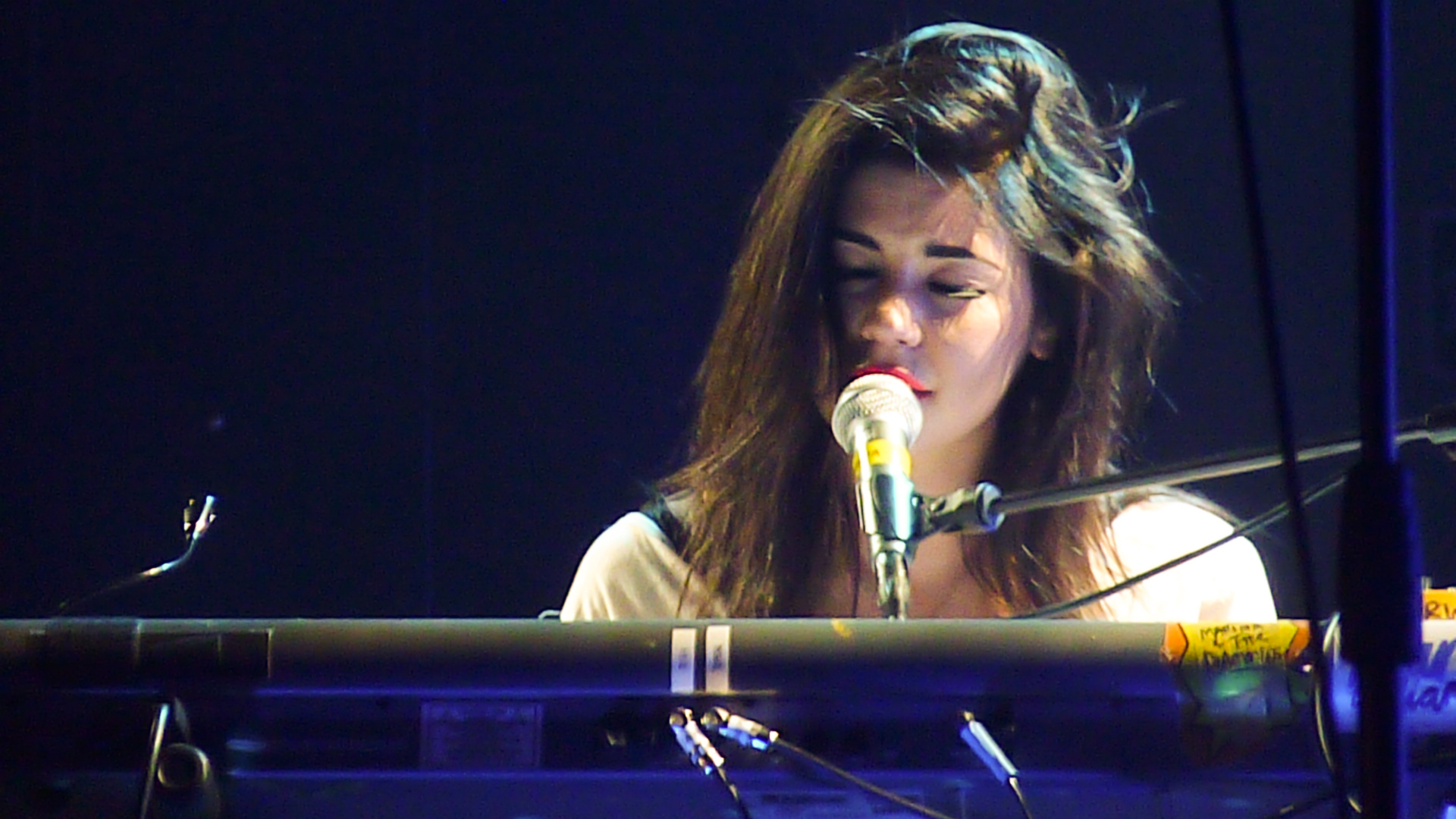
Diamandis performing "Obsessions" in May 2010 at Edinburgh's Assembly Rooms, during the Family Jewels Tour

"Obsessions" and "Mowgli's Road" were Diamandis' first singles, released as a double A-side in 7-inch format on 16 February 2009. "Mowgli's Road" was later released digitally on 13 November 2009, pairing with a cover of Late of the Pier's "Space and the Woods". She chose "Mowgli's Road" as an "uncommercial" taster due to its oddness, but it received attention after being shared by the likes of Perez Hilton and Kanye West.

"Hollywood" was released as the album's second single and Diamandis' first major release on 1 February 2010. It reached number 12 on the UK Singles Chart. It was followed on 26 April by "I Am Not a Robot", which peaked at number 26 on the same listing. "Oh No!" was released as the album's fourth single on 2 August only in the UK and Ireland; it charted at number 38. "Shampain" was released as the album's fifth and final single on 11 October, again only in the same region, and reached number 141 in the UK. "I Am Not a Robot" was nominated for the 2010 Popjustice £20 Music Prize for best British single, eventually losing to "Kickstarts" by Example.

=== Tour ===
Diamandis went on her first headlining tour to promote the album, performing in Europe, North America and Australia. Dates included the Glastonbury Festival 2010, South by Southwest and the Falls Festival. In parallel to headlining her own tour in the United States in mid-2011, she was an opening act for Katy Perry's California Dreams Tour, and finished by opening for Coldplay's Mylo Xyloto Tour at the Manchester Arena that December. After a performance at Manchester's Deaf Institute on 21 February 2010, Contactmusic.com writer Katy Ratican awarded Diamandis a 9/10 rating, stating, "Next time she plays Manchester, it will be to a sold out Academy 2 audience, with a top-selling album gracing the merchandising stand. Marina won't be playing to a few hundred people above a trendy bar in the foreseeable future".

== Critical reception ==
Professional ratings
Aggregate scores
Source	Rating
AnyDecentMusic?	6.8/10
Metacritic	68/100
Review scores
Source	Rating
AllMusic	4/5 stars
The A.V. Club	C
Clash	6/10
The Daily Telegraph	4/5 stars
Drowned in Sound	5/10
The Guardian	3/5 stars
NME	9/10
Q	4/5 stars
Spin	7/10
The Sunday Times	3/5 stars

The Family Jewels received generally positive reviews from music critics. At Metacritic, which assigns a normalised rating out of 100 to reviews from mainstream publications, the album received an average score of 68, based on 21 reviews. Hugh Montgomery of Q magazine noted that the singer's "imaginative reach" was "complemented by a winning pop savviness", while Luke O'Neil from The Phoenix stated that "[t]he likes of Kate Nash and company have flitted through this piano siren/exuberant dance-diva territory, but never mind, because this gorgeous genre starts now." Leonie Cooper of NME praised the album as "astonishing" and wrote that "Diamandis mixes sparkling pop with beautiful darkness for a debut that dazzles".

More mixed reviews were critical of Diamandis' vocal delivery. Lou Thomas from BBC Music commented that "over 13 songs of Sparks-voice and many similar staccato piano riffs listeners may feel bludgeoned", and Sean O'Neal of The A.V. Club wrote that after "dozens of squeaky Regina Spektor-ish enunciations" and "Kate Bush trills", the "overbearing need to prove herself just ends up being exhausting". Joe Rivers of No Ripcord praised "Are You Satisfied?", "Hollywood" and "Oh No!" but was put off by sudden "howling" in "Hermit the Frog" and a "throaty growl" in "The Outsider". Joe Copplestone of PopMatters concluded that Diamandis would have to "tone down" these vocal techniques on future releases as not to overshadow "melodically inventive" music.

A negative review came from The Independent's Andy Gill who panned "Shampain" and "Hermit the Frog" as "every bit as annoying as their punning titles, with queasy, prancing piano and synth figures". He found certain vocal techniques in "Mowgli's Road" and "I Am Not a Robot" to be "infantile", and evaluated the lyrics of "Girls" and "Hollywood" as shallow. At Drowned in Sound, Mary Bellamy described the album as split between original songwriting and commercial pop production "at the expense of achieving anything great in either camp". NME placed the album at number 33 on its list of the Top 75 Albums of 2010.

== Commercial performance ==
The Family Jewels debuted at number five on the UK Albums Chart with first-week sales of 27,618 copies. It remains Diamandis' best-selling debut week in the UK, although her second studio album Electra Heart entered the chart at number one with first-week sales of 21,358 units. It ranked at number 87 in the Official Charts Company's list of the highest selling albums of 2010 in the UK. The Family Jewels was later certified Platinum by the British Phonographic Industry (BPI) in 2025 for sales of 300,000 copies. The record debuted at number seven in Greece and number nine in Ireland; it was eventually certified Gold by the Irish Recorded Music Association (IRMA).

The Family Jewels performed moderately on several international record charts. It reached number 12 in Germany, and entered the Austrian chart at number 18. It peaked at number 88 in the Netherlands, number 100 in Switzerland, and number 132 in France. In Oceania, the album reached number 79 in Australia. With first-week sales of 4,000 copies in the United States, The Family Jewels entered the Billboard 200 at number 138, while peaking at numbers two and 49 on Billboard's Top Heatseekers and Top Rock Albums charts, respectively. As of 2012, The Family Jewels had sold 300,000 copies worldwide.

In an interview for Australian radio in January 2011, Diamandis said that her career that far had been "more like a failure than a success", particularly in the American market. She attributed this to the inaction of Chop Shop Records, her label in the United States, as well as a move in musical tastes to "pumping beats" by artists like Lady Gaga. She cancelled performances in the United States in order to begin work on a new album.

== Track listing ==
All tracks are written by Marina Diamandis except where noted.

Standard edition
No.	Title	Writer(s)	Producer(s)	Length
1.	"Are You Satisfied?"		Liam Howe; Richard "Biff" Stannard; Ash Howes	3:21
2.	"Shampain"	Diamandis; Howe; Pascal Gabriel	Gabriel; Howe; Stannard^{[a]}; Howes^{[a]}	3:11
3.	"I Am Not a Robot"		Howe	3:35
4.	"Girls"	Diamandis; Howe; Gabriel	Gabriel; Howe	3:28
5.	"Mowgli's Road"	Diamandis; Howe	Howe	3:12
6.	"Obsessions"		Howe	3:38
7.	"Hollywood"		Stannard; Howes; Starsmith^{[b]}	3:50
8.	"The Outsider"		Howe; Diamandis	3:17
9.	"Hermit the Frog"		Howe; Diamandis^{[a]}	3:35
10.	"Oh No!"	Diamandis; Greg Kurstin	Kurstin	3:02
11.	"Rootless"	Diamandis; Howe; Gabriel	Gabriel; Howe	3:28
12.	"Numb"		Howe	4:16
13.	"Guilty"	Diamandis; Stannard; Howes	Stannard; Howes	3:40
Total length:				45:35

iTunes Store (bonus track)
No.	Title	Producer(s)	Length
14.	"The Family Jewels"	Howe	4:05
Total length:			49:40

Japanese edition (bonus tracks)
No.	Title	Producer(s)	Length
15.	"Seventeen"	Howe	3:05
16.	"Mowgli's Road" (music video)		3:02
17.	"Hollywood" (music video)		3:25
Total length:			59:12

American standard edition
No.	Title	Writer(s)	Producer(s)	Length
7.	"Hollywood" (single version)		Stannard; Howes; Starsmith^{[b]}	3:24
8.	"The Outsider"		Howe; Diamandis	3:17
9.	"Guilty"	Diamandis; Stannard; Howes	Stannard; Howes	3:40
10.	"Hermit the Frog"		Howe; Diamandis^{[a]}	3:35
11.	"Oh No!"	Diamandis; Kurstin	Kurstin	3:02
12.	"Seventeen"		Howe	3:05
13.	"Numb"		Howe	4:16
Total length:				44:44

iTunes Store American deluxe edition (bonus tracks)
No.	Title	Writer(s)	Producer(s)	Length
14.	"Rootless"	Diamandis; Howe; Gabriel	Diamandis; Gabriel; Howe	3:28
15.	"I Am Not a Robot" (Flex'd Rework) (Passion Pit remix)		Howe; Passion Pit^{[c]}	4:47
16.	"Obsessions" (Ocelot remix)		Howe; Ocelot^{[c]}	6:26
17.	"I Am Not a Robot" (Starsmith 24 Carat remix)		Howe; Starsmith^{[c]}	5:18
18.	"Hollywood" (music video)			3:25
Total length:				64:51

2021 digital deluxe edition (bonus tracks)
No.	Title	Producer(s)	Length
15.	"The Family Jewels"	Howe	4:05
16.	"Hollywood" (Gonzales remix)	Stannard; Howes; Starsmith; Gonzales^{[c]}	3:43
17.	"Obsessions" (Ocelot remix)	Howe; Ocelot^{[c]}	6:26
18.	"I Am Not a Robot" (Flex'd Rework) (Passion Pit remix)	Howe; Passion Pit^{[c]}	4:47
19.	"I Am Not a Robot" (Starsmith 24 Carat remix)	Howe; Starsmith^{[c]}	5:18
20.	"I Am Not a Robot" (No Shoes remix)	Howe; The Shoes^{[c]}	4:02
Total length:			73:16

Notes

- ^{^a} signifies an additional producer
- ^{^b} signifies an original producer
- ^{^c} signifies a remixer

== Personnel ==
Credits adapted from the liner notes of The Family Jewels.

=== Musicians ===
- Marina Diamandis – vocals (all tracks); piano (tracks 1–3, 6, 8, 12), glockenspiel (track 3); Casio VL-tone (track 8); organ (track 12)
- Richard "Biff" Stannard – keys (track 1); programming (tracks 1, 2, 7, 13); additional keys (track 2); all instruments (tracks 7, 13); drums (track 7)
- Ash Howes – keys (track 1); programming (tracks 1, 2, 7, 13); additional keys (track 2); all instruments (tracks 7, 13)
- Luke Potashnick – guitar (track 1)
- Lucy Shaw – string arrangements, double bass (tracks 1, 3, 7, 9, 12, 13)
- Liam Howe – programming (tracks 1–3, 5, 6, 8, 9, 12); bass (tracks 1, 2, 5, 6); Mellotron (tracks 1, 3, 6, 9, 12); synths (tracks 1–3, 6, 8); electric guitar, additional piano (track 2); Philicorda (track 3, 5, 6, 8, 9, 12); all instruments (tracks 4, 11); spoons, whistle, glockenspiel, acoustic guitar (track 5); Jew's harp, santoor (track 8); mandolin, recorders (tracks 9, 12)
- Alison Dods – violin (tracks 1, 3, 7, 13)
- Calina de la Mere – violin (tracks 1, 3)
- Rachel Robson – viola (tracks 1, 3)
- Chris Allan – cello (tracks 1, 3)
- Steve Durham – drums (tracks 1–3)
- Pascal Gabriel – programming (tracks 2, 4, 11); synths (track 2); all instruments (tracks 4, 11)
- Alex Mackenzie – harpsichord, drums (tracks 5, 6); additional piano, mandolin (track 6)
- Raymond67 (Freesound Project) – mechanical monkey (track 5)
- Sandyrb (Freesound Project) – human monkey (track 5)
- Stephen Large – string arrangements (tracks 7, 13); piano (tracks 9, 12); Hammond (track 12)
- Niel Catchpole – violin (tracks 7, 13)
- Oli Langford – viola (tracks 7, 9, 12, 13); violin (tracks 7, 13)
- Anna Mowat – cello (tracks 7, 13)
- Anna Phoebe – violin (tracks 9, 12)
- Rebekah Allan – violin (tracks 9, 12)
- Chris Worsey – cello (tracks 9, 12)
- David Westlake – drums (track 9)
- Greg Kurstin – keys, guitars, programming (track 10)

=== Technical ===
- Liam Howe – production (tracks 1–6, 8, 9, 11, 12); mixing (track 3, 5, 6, 8, 9, 12); engineering (tracks 5, 6, 8)
- Richard "Biff" Stannard – production (tracks 1, 7, 13); additional production (track 2); mixing (tracks 2, 7, 13)
- Ash Howes – production (tracks 1, 7, 13); mixing (tracks 1, 2, 7, 13); additional production (track 2)
- Richard Wilkinson – engineering (tracks 1–3, 9, 12)
- Dougal Lott – engineering assistance (tracks 1–3, 9, 12); Pro Tools (track 5)
- Pascal Gabriel – production (tracks 2, 4, 11); engineering, mixing (tracks 4, 11)
- Marina Diamandis – mixing (tracks 4, 11); production (track 8); additional production (track 9)
- Starsmith – original production (track 7)
- Greg Kurstin – production, recording, mixing (track 10)
- Guy Davie – mastering (tracks 1–9, 11–13)
- Dave Turner – mastering (track 10)

=== Artwork ===
- Mat Maitland – sleeve art
- Rankin – portraits

== Charts ==
=== Weekly charts ===
Chart (2010)	Peak position
Australian Albums (ARIA)	79
Austrian Albums (Ö3 Austria)	18
Dutch Albums (Album Top 100)	88
European Albums (Billboard)	20
French Albums (SNEP)	132
German Albums (Offizielle Top 100)	12
Greek International Albums (IFPI)	7
Irish Albums (IRMA)	9
Scottish Albums (Official Charts)	6
Swiss Albums (Schweizer Hitparade)	100
UK Albums (Official Charts)	5
US Billboard 200	138
US Heatseekers Albums (Billboard)	2
US Top Rock Albums (Billboard)	49

=== Year-end charts ===
Chart (2010)	Position
UK Albums (OCC)	87

== Certifications and sales ==
Region	Certification	Certified units/sales
Ireland (IRMA)	Gold	7,500^{^}
United Kingdom (BPI)	Platinum	300,000^{^}
^{^} Shipments figures based on certification alone.

== Release history ==
List of release dates, editions, and formats
Region	Date	Format(s)	Edition	Label(s)	Ref.
Various	13 March 2015	CD; digital download; streaming	Standard	679; Atlantic	
United States	15 June 2010	LP	Standard	Chop Shop; Atlantic	
Various	5 November 2021	Digital download; streaming	Deluxe	679	
