= Oh No! (Marina and the Diamonds song) =

Single by Marina and the Diamonds

from the album The Family Jewels
- B-side: "Starstrukk"
- Released: 2 August 2010
- Recorded: December 2009
- Studio: Kingsize Soundlabs, Silver Lake, California
- Genre: Avant-garde; electropop; dance-rock
- Length: 3:02
- Label: 679; Chop Shop; Atlantic
- Songwriters: Marina Diamandis; Greg Kurstin
- Producer: Greg Kurstin

Marina and the Diamonds singles chronology
"I Am Not a Robot" (2010)	"Oh No!" (2010)	"Shampain" (2010)

Music video
- "Oh No!" on YouTube

"Oh No!" is a song by Welsh singer Marina Diamandis, released under the stage name Marina and the Diamonds, from her debut studio album, The Family Jewels (2010). It was released as the album's fourth single on 2 August 2010.

== Background and composition ==
"Oh No!" is an avant-garde, electropop, and dance-rock song with heavy synths. Written on a trip to Los Angeles a week after The Family Jewels was mastered, it was the final track to complete the album. The singer explained:

["Oh No!"] was written in response to be terrified of not achieving what I say I want to achieve every time I open my big mouth. It's my part II to "Mowgli's Road". I was paralysed by fear before my trip to the states and couldn't stop thinking about being a failure "etc" and was convinced that I'd become a self-fulfilling prophecy if my brain didn't shut up and stop being so negative. So I put it in a song. "Mowgli's [Road]" questioned who I want to be, "Oh No!" confirms it. It made me feel confident again after a shaky 6 months. Life is just a barrel of laughs at end of day, anyway!

On Greg Kurstin, who produced the song, she said, "I had really admired his work for a long time. Seeing as I was in LA, I asked if he wanted to write together and [the song] came out really well. He's great actually, very easy to work with. I really like his production style as well."

The instrumental of "Oh No!" was used to advertise the American sitcom The Big Bang Theory on E4 in the United Kingdom. On 25 July 2010, Diamandis performed the track on Channel 4's Big Brother's Little Brother, a spin-off show of the reality television series Big Brother in the UK and Ireland. "Oh No!" is included in the 2012 video game Just Dance 4. The song was used in a promo for the third season of the MTV series Awkward in 2013.

== Music video ==
Marina Diamandis in the music video for "Oh No!"

The music video for "Oh No!" was directed by Kinga Burza and filmed on 10 June 2010. It was released on 28 June 2010. Diamandis said the music video was influenced by 1990s cartoons and the old "zany neon" MTV graphics. Burza said the concept of the video stems from the lyric of "Oh No!", which references being obsessed with consumerism, success, money and fame. The music video features a sequence with four dancers choreographed by David Leighton. He described the routine as quirky and "very bubblegum pop". The stylist for the video was Celestine Cooney, who chose to feature outfits by Christopher Kane, Henry Holland and Ashish Soni.

== Track listings ==
- UK CD
1. "Oh No!" – 3:02
2. "Starstrukk" – 4:44
- UK digital download (EP)
1. "Oh No!" – 3:02
2. "Oh No!" (Active Child remix) – 3:53
3. "Oh No!" (Grum remix) – 4:22
4. "Oh No!" (Steve Pitron and Max Sanna remix) – 7:28
5. "Oh No!" (Jaymo & Andy George's Moda mix) – 4:02
- UK 7-inch

A. "Oh No!" – 3:02
B. "Oh No!" (Active Child remix)

== Credits and personnel ==
Credits adapted from the liner notes of The Family Jewels.

=== Recording and management ===
- Recorded at Kingsize Soundlabs, Silver Lake, California
- Mastered at 360 Mastering, London
- Published by Warner Chappell Music Publishing Ltd/Kurstin Music (ASCAP), EMI April Music Inc.

=== Personnel ===
- Marina Diamandis – vocals
- Greg Kurstin – production, keyboards, guitars, programming, recording, mixing
- Dave Turner – mastering

== Charts ==
Chart performance for "Oh No!"
Chart (2010)	Peak position
Scottish Singles Sales (Official Charts)	33
UK Singles (Official Charts)	38

== Certifications ==
Certifications for "Oh No!"
Region	Certification	Certified units/sales
New Zealand (RMNZ)	Gold	15,000^{‡}
United Kingdom (BPI)	Silver	200,000^{‡}
United States (RIAA)	Gold	500,000^{‡}
^{‡} Sales+streaming figures based on certification alone.
