= Hollywood (Marina and the Diamonds song) =

Single by Marina and the Diamonds

from the album The Family Jewels
- B-side: "Bad Kidz"
- Released: 29 January 2010
- Recorded: 2008–2009
- Studio: Sarm Studio 2, London; Biffco, Brighton, England
- Genre: Eurodisco; bubblegum pop; glam rock
- Length: 3:50
- Label: 679
- Songwriter: Marina Diamandis
- Producers: Richard "Biff" Stannard; Ash Howes; Starsmith

Marina and the Diamonds singles chronology
"Obsessions" / "Mowgli's Road" (2009)	"Hollywood" (2010)	"I Am Not a Robot" (2010)

Music video
- "Hollywood" on YouTube

"Hollywood" is a song by Welsh singer Marina Diamandis, released under the stage name Marina and the Diamonds, from her debut studio album, The Family Jewels (2010). It was released digitally on 29 January 2010 and physically on 1 February 2010 as the third single from The Family Jewels.

== Background and composition ==
"Hollywood" has been described to be a Eurodisco, bubblegum pop, and glam rock song. When asked why "Hollywood" was chosen as a single in an interview with the BBC News website, Diamandis said:

"I'm saying: "This is who I was. Hollywood infected my brain and I really valued the wrong things in life, but I changed dramatically."

"This obsession with celebrity culture is really unhealthy. I don't want to live my life like that, and I don't want to be a typical pop star".

Diamandis told The Sun: "That track is a sarcastic and cynical take on everything that's commercial about America. I love the country and people dearly and can't wait to tour there but I hate the way it brainwashes you. I am seduced by its pop culture but I don't want my brain to be infected."

== Critical reception ==
Fraser McAlpine of the BBC Chart Blog called "Hollywood" a "properly amazing pop song" and stated that "the level of insight displayed about America, culturally and politically, is on a par with the Razorlight song about America [...] Marina, for all that she's spotted that Hollywood is something of an upsettingly fake place, with scope for quite exciting things to happen, seems to get as much enjoyment out of just singing the word as she does from puncturing its ego." Caroline Sullivan of The Guardian called it "perky".

== Commercial performance ==
"Hollywood" debuted at number 12 on the UK Singles Chart, selling 25,746 copies in its first week. The single was certified silver by the British Phonographic Industry (BPI) on 1 September 2017, and as of February 2019, it had sold 211,000 units in the United Kingdom. "Hollywood" entered the Irish Singles Chart at number 45, Diamandis's first single to chart in Ireland. In its third week on the chart, it reached a new peak position of number 21.

== Music video ==
A scene from the music video for "Hollywood"

Another scene from the music video for "Hollywood"

The music video for "Hollywood" was directed by Kinga Burza and released onto YouTube on 30 November 2009. It was filmed in "a house which is basically like a palace" in West London. The video shows an American patriotic party with multiple American flags used as decorations and clothing. There are a number of characters and objects that symbolise the stereotype of American culture featured in the music video such as cheerleaders, jocks, American football players, a pageant queen, paparazzi, a cowgirl, baseball players, look-alikes of Elvis Presley, James Dean, Marilyn Monroe and President Barack Obama, hot dogs, popcorn and an Academy Award.

Chilly Gonzales made a "stripped-down" remix of the song, for which Dan Knight filmed a video. Knight wanted his video to be the opposite of Burza's "super high glossy" work and to instead have the appearance of 1980s performances on programmes such as Top of the Pops. In his video, Gonzales and Diamandis perform on a fictional Estonian television programme called Pop!, complete with subtitles in the nation's language.

== Track listings ==
- CD
1. "Hollywood" (single version) – 3:23
2. "Hollywood" (Gonzalez remix) – 3:43
- Digital EP
1. "Hollywood" (single version) – 3:23
2. "Hollywood" (Gonzalez remix) – 3:43
3. "Hollywood" (Fenech-Soler remix) – 5:45
4. "Hollywood" (Monarchy 'gliese remix') – 7:26
5. "Hollywood" (acoustic) – 3:38
- UK 7-inch single

A. "Hollywood" (single version) – 3:23
B. "Bad Kidz" – 3:49

- UK limited-edition signed 7-inch single

A. "Hollywood" (single version) – 3:23
B. "Hollywood" (Gonzales remix) – 3:43

== Credits and personnel ==
Credits adapted from the liner notes of The Family Jewels.

=== Recording and management ===
- Recorded at Sarm Studio 2 (London, England) and Biffco Studios (Brighton, England)
- Mixed at Sarm Studio 2 (London, England)
- Mastered at Electric Mastering (London, England)
- Published by Warner Chappell Music Publishing Ltd

=== Personnel ===
- Marina Diamandis – vocals
- Richard "Biff" Stannard – production, mixing, all instruments, programming, drums
- Ash Howes – production, mixing, all instruments, programming
- Starsmith – original production
- Lucy Shaw – string arrangements, double bass
- Stephen Large – string arrangements
- Alison Dods – violin
- Niel Catchpole – violin
- Oli Langford – viola, violin
- Anna Mowat – cello
- Guy Davie – mastering

== Charts ==
=== Weekly charts ===
Weekly chart performance for "Hollywood"
Chart (2010–2012)	Peak position
Austria (Ö3 Austria Top 40)	17
Czech Republic Airplay (ČNS IFPI)	27
Denmark Airplay (Tracklisten)	10
Germany (GfK)	15
Ireland (IRMA)	21
Scottish Singles Sales (Official Charts)	11
Slovakia Airplay (ČNS IFPI)	68
UK Singles (Official Charts)	12

=== Year-end charts ===
Year-end chart performance for "Hollywood"
Chart (2010)	Position
UK Albums (OCC)	135

== Certifications ==
Certifications for "Hollywood"
Region	Certification	Certified units/sales
United Kingdom (BPI)	Silver	211,000
