= Philicorda =

Electronic musical instrument

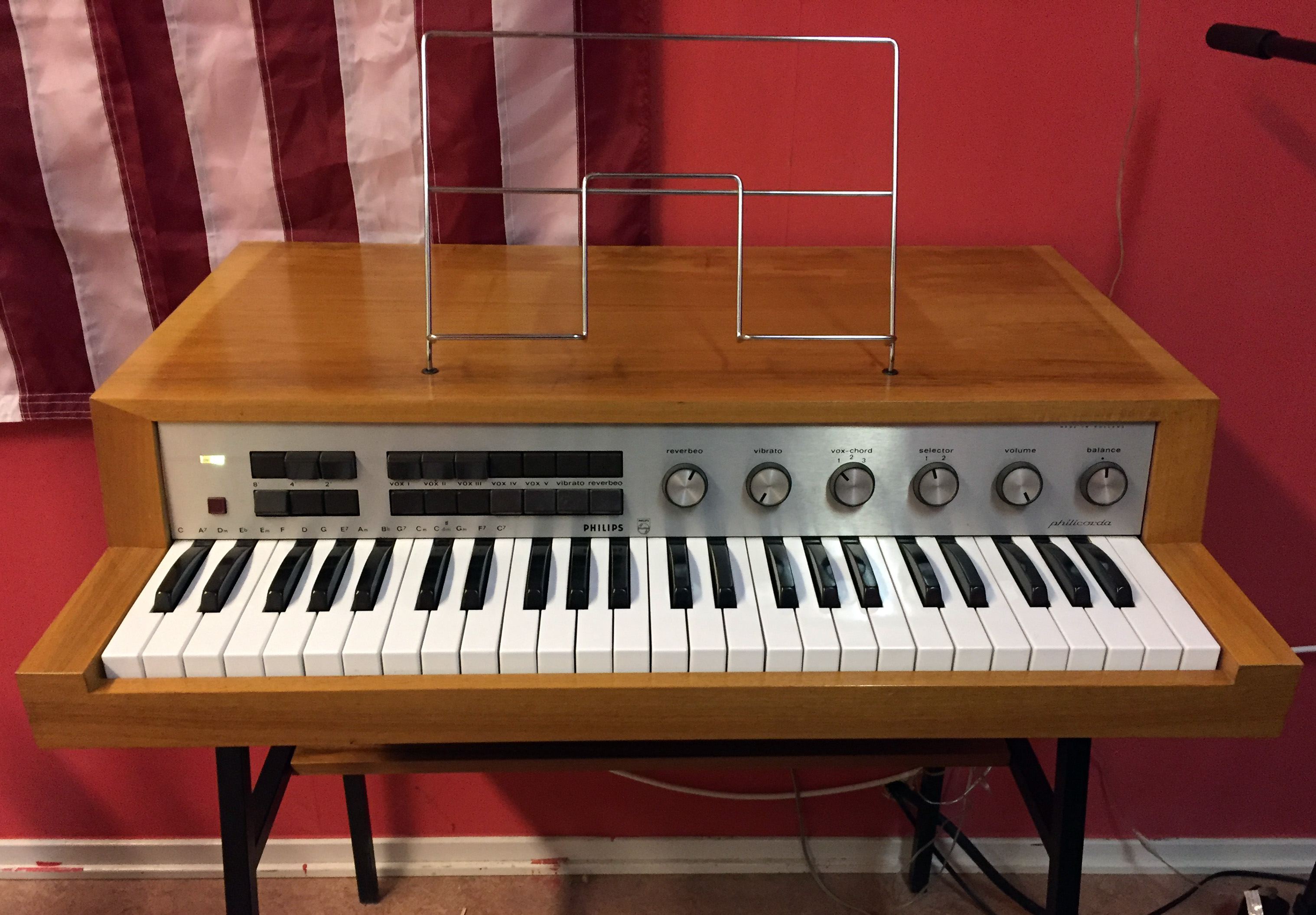
- 1967 Philicorda 22GM751
- Manufacturer: Philips
- Dates: 1961–1979

Technical specifications
- Polyphony: full polyphony all keys can play simultaneously
- Oscillator: 12 hartley oscillators with frequency dividers
- Synthesis type: Electric organ
- Effects: Vibrato, reverb

Input/output
- Keyboard: 49-key manuals: 1 on combo organs, 2 on electronic organs

The Philicorda is an electronic organ first produced in the 1960s by Philips. It was Philips' first entry into musical instruments and targeted the home market.

== History ==
The Philicorda came out of the Philips Natuurkundig Laboratorium in Eindhoven, under Tom Dissevelt and Dick Raaijmakers, who worked on electronic music and electronic musical instruments; it was here that the prototype of the AG7400 organ was produced.

== 1960s models ==
The AG7400 was launched onto the market in 1961, as a four-octave, 49 keys single manual, beginning with tone C version. Unusually for the time, it offered several audio inputs and outputs. The organ also shipped with a volume pedal and offered three settings--organ, organ with bass keys and single-finger chords. The AG7400 did not have an internal speaker.

At the beginning of 1963, its successor, the AG7500, was officially launched as the Philicorda. As well as the AG 7500/00, various other versions were produced amongst others for the English (AG7500/11?) and German (AG7500/22) markets. Located below the AG7500 was a tube amplifier with speakers.

The AG7600, launched soon after, was a soundbar type separate amplifier with loudspeakers and offered a spring reverb effect.

The Philicorda 751 (22GM751 with various country specific suffixes such as 22GM751/22 for Germany) was launched in 1967, some of them had both valves (preamp stage) and transistors, followed by the 22GM752, which was fully transistorized. A later model, the 22GM753, launched at the end of 1967, was designed for the stage and was fully transistorized.

Although Philicordas, from the AG7400 to the 22GM753, had slight differences in sound, the Philicorda's typical warm tone, originally produced using neon bulb based octave dividers, was consistent over the years.

== Single-finger chords ==
Each Philicorda had 17 pre-programmed chords (C - A7 - Dm - Eb - Em - F - D - G - E7 - Am - B - G7 - Cm - B9 - Gm - F7 - C7), although key assignments varied between models.

== Licensing ==
In the US, the Philicorda 753 was distributed by J. C. Penney under the Penncrest name, available in blue or black, as opposed to the previous natural wood finishes.

== 1970s models ==
The GM754 was launched in the early 1970s, with altered chord availability, speaker holes below the chassis and sliders instead of knobs.

The GM760 series were double-manual organs. In the late 1970s, Philips launched the double-manual PhilicordaRhythm series.

== In pop music ==
In the 1960s, the Philicorda was utilized by bands including The Monks.

Singer Chris Montez's 1962 hit single "Let's Dance" features the Philicorda organ prominently.

In recent years, the organ has undergone a revival. Notable users include Nick Power of The Coral, and Teenage Fanclub's Norman Blake. The Philicorda also features on 19 by Adele.

The German cabaret artist Hanns Dieter Hüsch used a Philicorda for decades in his stage performances.
