= Mowgli's Road =

Single by Marina and the Diamonds

from the album The Family Jewels
- A-side: "Obsessions" "Space and the Woods"
- Released: 16 February 2009
- Recorded: 2008
- Studio: The Ivory Tower; Konk, London
- Genre: Pop; alternative pop; experimental pop
- Length: 3:12
- Label: 679; Neon Gold
- Songwriters: Marina Diamandis; Liam Howe
- Producer: Liam Howe

Marina and the Diamonds singles chronology
"Obsessions" / "Mowgli's Road" (2009)	"Hollywood" (2010)

Music video
- "Mowgli's Road" on YouTube

"Mowgli's Road" is a song by Welsh singer Marina and the Diamonds from her debut studio album, The Family Jewels (2010). The song's demo was released as a double A-side single with "Obsessions", on 16 February 2009 by Neon Gold Records. On 13 November 2009, "Mowgli's Road" was released digitally again as a double A-side, pairing with a cover of the Late of the Pier song "Space and the Woods".

The title is a reference to the character of the same name in Rudyard Kipling's The Jungle Book story collection. It has been described to be a pop, alternative pop, and experimental pop song.

== Critical reception ==
Stuart Heritage of The Guardian wrote, "'Mowgli's Road' is odd. Think Gary Glitter, but if he kept pictures of The Wicker Man and some nice cutlery on his hard drive instead of that other stuff. This could easily be a hit; or, rather, the first couple of minutes could. Then it descends into a lunatic mixture of monkey wails, whistling and childlike nightmare mumbles that may well be responsible for my chronic insomnia."

== Music video ==
Diamandis in the music video for Mowgli's Road

The music video for "Mowgli's Road" was directed by Chris Sweeney and released onto YouTube on 20 October 2009. The video features Marina and two girls with origami limbs and torso dancing in a spotlight with a white screen. In the second verse, Marina sings into a microphone on a stand. It begins with Marina standing without lighting and stomping her origami legs to the beat of the music. When the lighting comes on, Marina begins singing and moving her origami legs; two female dancers with the same legs appear and dance with her. After the repeat of the chorus, Marina is shown with her origami torso, bouncing up and down while singing the third verse. While the music continues in the song, Marina and the dancers dance with all limbs in origami form. The video ends with the lighting of the set going out and they all stand as Marina was in the beginning.

== Track listings ==
- Digital single

No.	Title	Writer(s)	Length
1.	"Mowgli's Road"	Marina Diamandis; Liam Howe	3:05
2.	"Space and the Woods" (Late of the Pier cover)	Sam Eastgate	2:49

- Digital remixes

All tracks are written by Marina Diamandis and Liam Howe.

No.	Title	Length
1.	"Mowgli's Road" (The Phenomenal Handclap Band Remix)	4:53
2.	"Mowgli's Road" (Russ Chimes Remix)	5:09

- UK limited-edition 7-inch single

No.	Title	Writer(s)	Length
1.	"Mowgli's Road" (A-side)	Marina Diamandis; Liam Howe	3:05
2.	"Space and the Woods" (B-side) (Late of the Pier cover)	Sam Eastgate	2:49

== Credits and personnel ==
Credits adapted from the liner notes of The Family Jewels.

=== Recording and management ===
- Recorded at The Ivory Tower and Konk Studios (London, England)
- Mixed at The Ivory Tower
- Mastered at Electric Mastering (London, England)
- Published by Warner Chappell Music Publishing Ltd/Sony/ATV

=== Personnel ===
- Marina Diamandis – vocals
- Liam Howe – production, engineering, programming, drums, spoons, Philicorda, whistle, glockenspiel, bass, acoustic guitar, mixing
- Dougal Lott – Pro Tools
- Alex Mackenzie – harpsichord, drums
- Raymond67 (Freesound Project) – mechanical monkey
- Sandyrb (Freesound Project) – human monkey
- Guy Davie – mastering
