= Shampain =

Single by Marina and the Diamonds

from the album The Family Jewels
- Released: 11 October 2010
- Recorded: 2009
- Studio: The Ivory Tower; Konk (London, England); Biffco (Brighton, England)
- Genre: Avant-garde; disco; electropop
- Length: 3:11
- Label: 679
- Songwriters: Marina Diamandis; Liam Howe; Pascal Gabriel
- Producers: Pascal Gabriel; Liam Howe

Marina and the Diamonds singles chronology
"Oh No!" (2010)	"Shampain" (2010)	"Primadonna" (2012)

Music video
- "Shampain" on YouTube

"Shampain" is a song by Welsh singer Marina Diamandis, released under the stage name Marina and the Diamonds from her debut studio album, The Family Jewels (2010). It was released on 11 October 2010 as the album's fifth and final single, only in the United Kingdom and Ireland.

== Background and composition ==
"Shampain" is an avant-garde, disco, and electropop song. When asked what "Shampain" was about and the production behind the song, Diamandis said:

"['Shampain' is about] the depressing side of getting drunk, the obliteration side of having a good time. This was actually the first co-write that I ever did... It was good to write a simpler pop song because when I write on my own the melodies are all over the place. It was good to do something a little bit lighter, and this probably is my lightest track on a record. It's about insomnia and the joys of champagne."

She added: "I hate [co-writing], so I do it because it's so challenging for me. As soon as I do it, I am really pleased that I have. I've had the pleasure of working with three great people... 'Shampain' was written with Pascal Gabriel, Liam Howe and we had a lot of fun doing it."

"Shampain" was used in an episode of the BBC Switch teen soap opera The Cut in December 2009. The song had the working title of "The Shampain Sleeper" in 2009.

In 2012, Diamandis expressed her dislike of the song in an interview with BBC Radio 1's Live Lounge, stating it would have been better suited for Kylie Minogue and that its inclusion on the album was by force.

== Critical reception ==
John Murphy of musicOMH described "Shampain" as "infectiously catchy and [having] enough depth not to be dismissed lightly as bubblegum pop." James Berry of Yahoo! Music stated the song "bucks like Goldfrapp riding The Killers' bronco". A number of critics had commented negatively regarding the title of the song. Gareth James from Clash opined the song "feel[s] a little forced". The Independent's Andy Gill wrote that "Shampain" is "every bit as annoying as [its] punning title, with queasy, prancing piano and synth figures labouring away methodically, Mika-fashion, while she searches unsuccessfully for worthwhile lyrical routes."

== Music video ==
Marina Diamandis in the music video for Shampain

The music video for "Shampain" was directed by Kim Gehri and filmed on 24 August 2010 in a park in London. It was released on 6 September 2010. The video starts off showing a full moon and a scene where candles are blown out as the title flashes onto the screen. Diamandis is then seen lying on a black silk pillow as the song begins. A burger wrapper flies across her face and the scene cuts to show her lying on the steps at a park bandstand. She stands up and walks through the park, followed by intoxicated dancing female partygoers reminiscent of the zombies in Michael Jackson's Thriller. The video ends with Diamandis waking up on a park bench as if the whole episode had been a dream.

== Track listings ==
- UK digital download (EP)
1. "Shampain" – 3:09
2. "Shampain" (acoustic) – 3:45
3. "Shampain" (Fred Falke remix) – 6:57
4. "Shampain" (Pictureplane's Deep Dolphin remix) – 3:34
5. "Shampain" (Oscar the Punk remix) – 5:51
- UK promotional maxi CD
1. "Shampain" (original version) – 3:14
2. "Shampain" (Fred Falke remix) – 6:59
3. "Shampain" (Pictureplane's Deep Dolphin remix) – 3:37
4. "Shampain" (Oscar the Punk remix) – 5:53
5. "Shampain" (the Last Skeptic remix) – 3:24

== Credits and personnel ==
Credits adapted from the liner notes of The Family Jewels.

=== Recording and management ===
- Recorded at The Ivory Tower, Konk Studios (London, England) and Biffco Studios (Brighton, England)
- Mastered at Electric Mastering (London, England)
- Published by Warner Chappell Music Publishing Ltd/Sony/ATV

=== Personnel ===
- Marina Diamandis – vocals, piano
- Pascal Gabriel – production, programming, synths
- Liam Howe – production, programming, bass, electric guitar, synths, additional piano
- Richard "Biff" Stannard – additional production, mixing, additional keys, programming
- Ash Howes – additional keys, programming
- Richard Wilkinson – engineering
- Dougal Lott – engineering assistance
- Steve Durham – drums
- Guy Davie – mastering

== Charts ==
Chart performance for "Shampain"
Chart (2010)	Peak position
UK Singles (OCC)	141
