= Butterfly (Marina song) =

2025 single by Marina

Single by Marina

from the album Princess of Power
- Released: 21 February 2025
- Genre: Alt-pop; chamber pop
- Length: 4:25
- Label: Queenie; BMG
- Songwriter: Marina Diamandis
- Producers: Marina; CJ Baran

Marina singles chronology
"Venus Fly Trap" (2021)	"Butterfly" (2025)	"Cupid's Girl" (2025)

Music video
- "Butterfly" on YouTube

"Butterfly" is a song by the Welsh singer and songwriter Marina from her sixth studio album, Princess of Power (2025). It was independently released as the lead single, (Note: Although the song was self-released, its publication states as Queenie Records, Diamandis' independent record label.) alongside an accompanying music video on 21 February 2025. This marked her first self-released song since both of her extended plays Mermaid vs Sailor (2007) and Froot Acoustic (2015).

Her first single release in nearly four years, Marina wrote and recorded the alt-pop and chamber pop song, and co-produced the record with American songwriter CJ Baran. Music critics highlighted the lyricism for "Butterfly" representing the insect of the same name through its life cycle, personal growth of an individual, and spiritual rebirth. The music video was directed by Aerin Moreno, where it depicts Marina dancing and singing through several liminal spaces.

Marina promoted the song with a live performance at the music festival Coachella 2025. Commercially, the song did not make an impact but appeared on the top 50 in the United Kingdom for downloads and sales, and the top 20 in New Zealand for its fast streams and airplay.

== Development and production ==
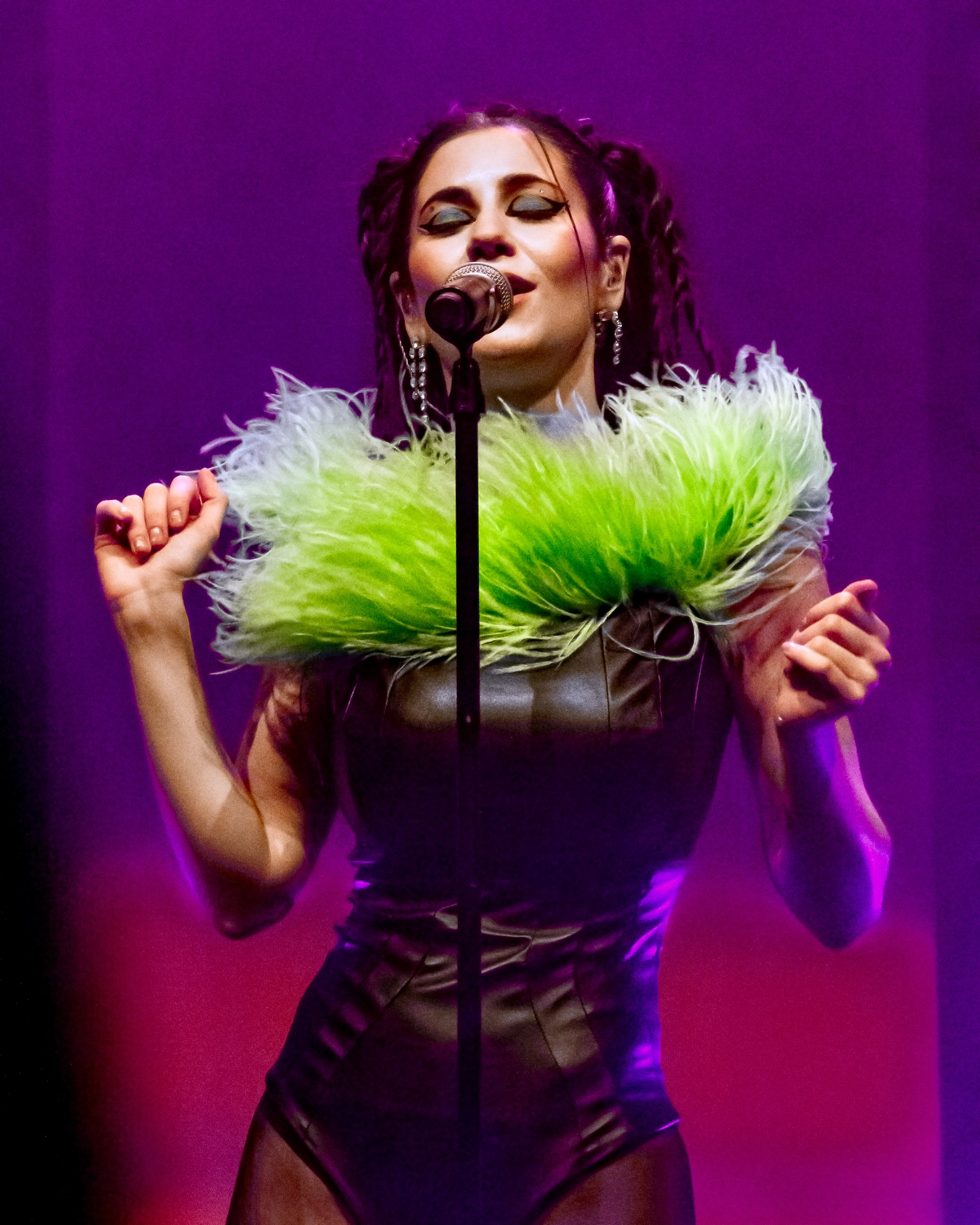
Marina performing during the Ancient Dreams in a Modern Land Tour in March 2022.

Following the release of her fifth studio album Ancient Dreams in a Modern Land (2021), which received generally positive reviews from music critics who compared it to her previous works, (Note: Supported by multiple references from AllMusic, Clash, The Line of Best Fit, The Observer, and Pitchfork.) Welsh singer and songwriter Marina gave sporadic updates and hints of being in the recording studio. She soon ended her fourteen-year long contract with Atlantic Records on 22 May during her tour with the same name. The same year in November, she uploaded an image through X (formerly Twitter) signing a document leading her independent label record, Queenie Records.

The following year, Marina revealed she had been working on her debut poetry book, Eat the World: A Collection of Poems (2024), due for release in October. She also disclosed in a Rolling Stone interview on 2 April 2024 that she had begun writing new music six months prior, but was not far along in the process. After supporting Australian singer Kylie Minogue for a one-off show, she soon confirmed to Attitude in 15 July, that the album is currently set to be released the upcoming year.

== Composition and lyrics ==
"Butterfly" is approximately a four-minute song written in the key of A minor, with a common time of 121 beats per minute (BPM). Marina wrote the record as she played the keyboards, synthesisers, and co-produced "Butterfly" alongside American record producer CJ Baran, whom played the drums, mellotron, and synthesisers. Meanwhile, the track was engineered by Baran, Nathan Dantzler, and Mitch McCarthy.

The record is identified as a house-infused chamber pop, and alt-pop anthem. The lyricism of the song mainly represented the insect of the same name, especially its life cycle showcasing the biological process of metamorphosis, which references spiritual rebirth and personal growth.

Some music journalists debated if production and her previous albums Electra Heart (2012) and Froot (2015) had a connection, while others disagreed. Caitlin Doherty for Staged Haze, saw the bridge sonically resembling "Are You Satisfied" from her debut album The Family Jewels (2010). Genna Rivieccio for Culled Culture, corresponded the lyrics to her poetry collection, mainly "Butterfly" and "Cocoon".

== Promotion and release ==
It was later reported the singer began to distribute gift bags for her fans in January 2025, containing living caterpillars with care instructions on how to nurture them. This "immersive campaign" received several mixed reactions such as environmental issues and its ethics but reached an "unprecedented level of prominence." Marina eventually posted a twenty-second teaser of her lip-syncing the song on various social media platforms on 7 February. Shortly, she revealed the song to be titled "Butterfly", which would be released the next two weeks and made it available for pre-save via her website and different streaming services.

Marina independently released the song on 21 February 2025, worldwide digitally for music download and streaming, (Note: Diamandis gave an exclusive license for "Butterfly" and was distributed through music company BMG Rights Management.) with a music video premiering the same day. This marked four years after the release of "Venus Fly Trap" (2021) and her first self-released song since the acoustic extended play Froot (2015). Afterwards, the song was later performed live at various summer music festivals such as Coachella and Outside Lands; alongside the following released songs "Cupid's Girl" and "Cuntissimo".

== Music video ==
An accompanying music video for "Butterfly" was released through video sharing platform YouTube, directed by Aerin Moreno. It subsequently premiered through various digital channels owned by MTV Entertainment Group, and was showcased at a billboard for Paramount Plaza in commercial intersection Times Square located in New York City, United States.

The music video opens with a darkened bedroom featuring Marina, wearing a black girdle and red high heels, laying over a plastic-covered bed, with her makeup reflecting the ambience around her. She later begins to dance around through multiple vintage-styled liminal spaces, while wearing an ensemble of colorful garments. Marina choreographing resembles a butterfly, whom she wore a black bedazzled outfit featuring the insect.

== Credits and personnel ==
Credits and personnel adapted from the liner notes of Princess of Power.

- Marina Diamandis – keyboards, producer, songwriting, synthesizer, vocals
- Christopher John Baran – drums, engineering, mellotron, producer, programming, string arrangement, synthesizer
- Nathan Dantzler – engineering
- Mitch McCarthy – engineering

== Chart performances ==
Chart performances for "Butterfly"
Chart (2025)	Peak position
New Zealand Hot Singles (RMNZ)	19
UK Singles Downloads (Official Charts)	46
UK Singles Sales (OCC)	48

== Release history ==
Release dates and formats for "Butterfly"
Region	Date	Format(s)	Label	Ref.
Various	21 February 2025	Digital download; streaming	Queenie; BMG	
