= Princess of Power (album) =

2025 studio album by Marina

- Standard edition cover

Studio album by Marina
- Released: 6 June 2025
- Genre: Synth-pop
- Length: 47:39
- Labels: Queenie; BMG
- Producers: CJ Baran; Marina

Marina chronology
Ancient Dreams in a Modern Land (2021)	Princess of Power (2025)

Singles from Princess of Power
- 1. "Butterfly" Released: 21 February 2025; 2. "Cupid's Girl" Released: 21 March 2025; 3. "Cuntissimo" Released: 10 April 2025

Princess of Power is the sixth studio album by the Welsh singer and songwriter Marina. (Note: She was previously known by her former stage name as Marina and the Diamonds until 2018.) It was released independently and distributed through music company BMG Rights Management on 6 June 2025. (Note: The album was self-released but states its label as Queenie Records, Diamandis' independent record label.) With this partnership, she wrote and began recording material with American producer Christopher John "CJ" Baran. It is a maximalist-influenced record with elements of synth-pop, exploring themes such as empowerment, feminism, sexual freedom, and tragedy.

After releasing her fifth studio album, Ancient Dreams in a Modern Land (2021), Marina left Atlantic Records and launched her own independent record label. She later halted on writing music and gave an update related to her health in 2023. Eventually, she published her poetry collection titled Eat the World (2024), which primarily focused on her youth. The book showed its contribution to the album when Marina began listening to prominent artists from the 1970s and 2000s pop music. This soon inspired its production, being characterised by its upbeat arrangements of synthesisers, backed by a melodic orchestra from the string section.

Upon its release, the album was met with positive reviews from music critics, who highlighted its overall European disco-esque production and roguish lyricism from Marina. Princess of Power marks her first self-released album since her second extended play, Froot Acoustic (2015). It debuted at number seven in the United Kingdom (Official Albums Chart), while it reached the top twenty in Austria, Germany, the Netherlands, and Switzerland. It also landed at number forty-two in the United States (Billboard 200), higher than her past album.

Three singles supported Princess of Power prior to its release, all of which had accompanying music videos; "Butterfly" was the lead single, followed by "Cupid's Girl" and "Cuntissimo". "I <3 You" also received a music video that coincided with the album release. To further promote her project, Marina performed in multiple festivals (such as Coachella) and embarked her sixth eponymous concert tour from September 2025 to August 2026. A deluxe edition was released on 24 October 2025, this included a guest appearance from British singer Absolutely, along with four bonus tracks.

== Development ==
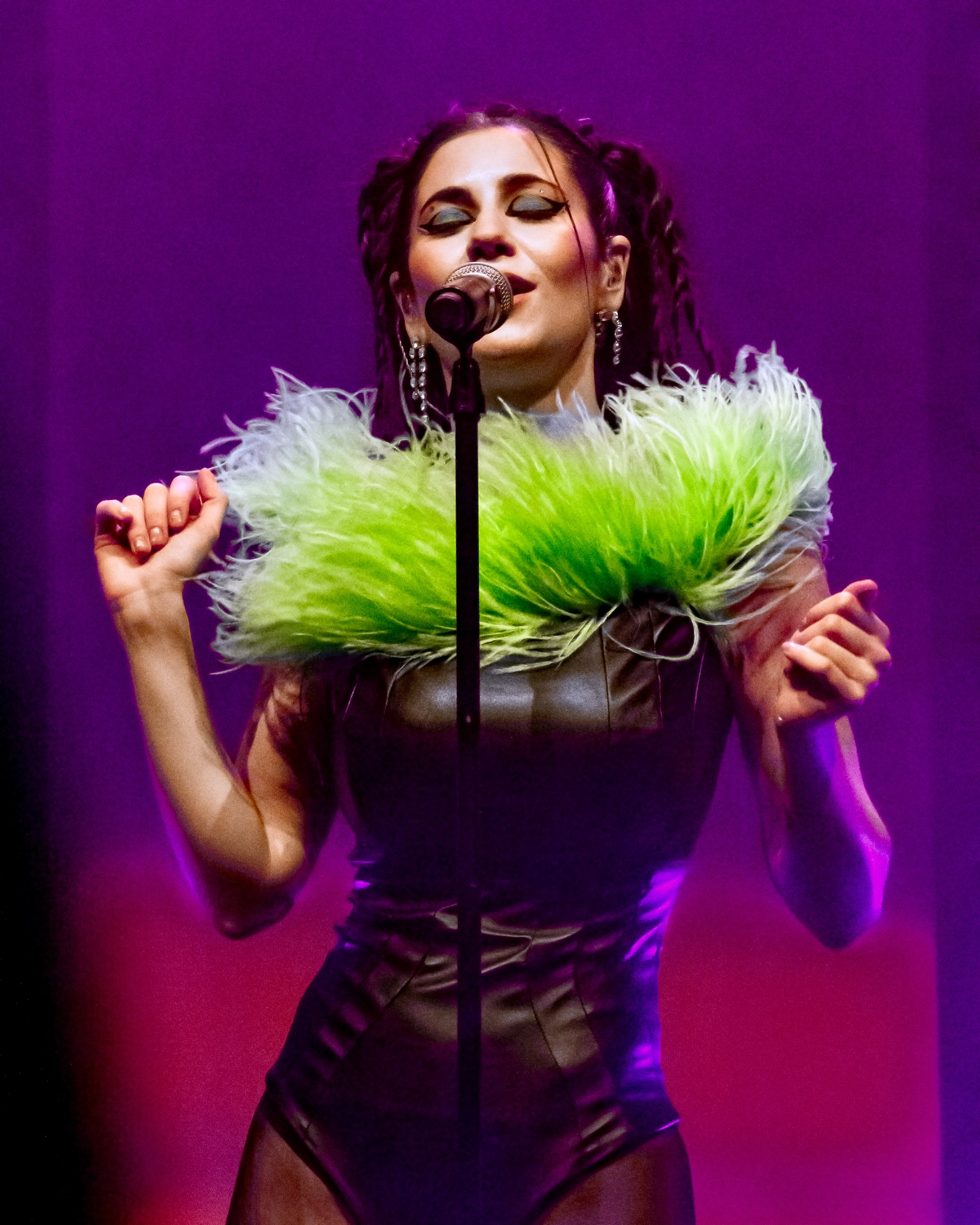
Marina performing during the Ancient Dreams in a Modern Land Tour in March 2022

Following its release, Ancient Dreams in a Modern Land (2021), received generally positive reviews from music critics. (Note: Supported by multiple references from AllMusic, Clash, The Line of Best Fit, The Observer, and Pitchfork.) Subsequently, the Welsh singer and songwriter Marina announced and embarked her tour of the same name, beginning on 2 February 2022. While touring, she reissued an expanded version of her second studio album, Electra Heart (2012), honoring its tenth anniversary. During her performance at O_{2} Academy Brixton on 22 May, Marina revealed that she would be ending her 14-year contract with Atlantic Records. Later that year, in November, she uploaded an image through X (formerly Twitter) signing a document "for and on behalf of" her newly created independent label record, Queenie Records LLC.

In 2023, there were no developments until Marina gave an update related to her health; she had been diagnosed with myalgic encephalomyelitis (ME). Before she knew the cause of her poor health, Marina explained that she had experienced various symptoms related to the condition over seven years, during which she relied on "adrenaline and will power to push [her] through each day.⁣" She further stated that while prioritizing healing was "demanding a lot of [her] energy and attention," it was necessary to "get back to [her] creative life again." The following year, Marina revealed she had been working on her debut poetry book, Eat the World: A Collection of Poems (2024), due for release in October. She also disclosed in a Rolling Stone interview on 2 April 2024, that she had begun writing new music six months prior, but was not far along in the process.

After supporting Australian singer Kylie Minogue for a one-off show, she confirmed to Attitude on 15 July that her next album was set to be released in 2025. That same month, Variety reported that Marina had signed with Volara Management. Having the book published, she spoke with Vanity Fair on how it had some relevance to her untitled record, especially her youth, which put her in a different perspective while being "deep in production." The next year, she reflected on her past music with Plastik, commenting on the significant aesthetic and compositional shifts over her career. When questioned about whether she would ever consider creating another alter ego, she answered, "My next record is very playful and has a character-led concept, but not in the same way as Electra Heart". (Note: Electra Heart is known as Diamandis' first alter ego, representing female archetypes in American popular culture from the 2010s.) Moreover, Marina clarified that she found constantly embodying a single persona too confining, going on to say, "I like freedom and experimentation. This next era is very fun. It has a special energy."

== Themes and composition ==
"We are meeting a Marina who is not guarding her heart so much anymore, [and] has felt so freeing is that [...] I've really dove into my fear of love. It's a courageous thing, particularly if you've been hurt in the past. It can be really hard to reprogram yourself, and I've finally been able to do that."

— Diamandis, explaining her self-identity affected her creative process to Rolling Stone.

Before the release, Marina spoke with Pride about how the project was inspired from listening to prominent artists from the 1970s and 2000s pop music such as Kylie Minogue, American singer Madonna, and Swedish group ABBA. This caused Marina regaining her innovative process which led her into writing the "emotive" album and characterize it as "bright" and "tragic," although she did not intend in creating a pop record when developing her track listing, but she "want[ed] to give that energy" as American record producer CJ Baran became her creative partner. Marina further elaborated with The Washington Post as the album does not constitute as a "very political record, [but] it does grapple with what power means, [...] especially for a musician navigating the youth-obsessed world of pop". Marina had also mention the album is a "benefit to women, instead of a loss" and to be fully energized of euphoria and empowerment as each song progresses.

Princess of Power has been described as a maximalist and synth-pop record, that contains a total of thirteen tracks full of "theatrical ballads" expanding into a metaphoric video game concept. Beginning with its eponymous track, the artist reintroduces herself in "a triumphant chorus" confronting her flaws and evolution ("Stuck in a loveless generation / Ready to go through a transformation"), which made a huge shift internally being a "declaration of intent."

"Butterfly", the following track and lead single morphs into a house-infused chamber pop song that is later identified as "an after-hours dancefloor anthem." The lyricism of the record finds Marina exploring spiritual rebirth and personal growth, which cross-references its biological process of metamorphosis for the insect of the same name. "Cuntissimo" was described as a dreamy electro and techno-pop melodic track that draws inspiration from various women who embodied strength and independence as they are "enjoying their lives without judgment." Marina reflects the central theme for the song is pleasure as she believes women have been denied from it due to patriarchal pressures and now is against from its societal constraints. "Rollercoaster" draws influence with a similar beat of "Hollaback Girl" (2005) by American singer Gwen Stefani; Marina writes out her escapism as she wants to experience the thrill and happiness from life.

"Cupid's Girl", the fifth track is a strong and empowered synth-pop song with fewer elements highlighting new rave and darkwave. This songwriting opens with commentary based on playful or seductive romance which displays "[Marina's] self-awareness and yearning, singing about love's complexities with both humor and depth." The following track "Metallic Stallion" had an opposite meaning that delve into a person questioning its intimacy with one another.

"I <3 You" was composed out as a love letter in a time capsule for its popular culture of the 1970s, specifically during the urban nightlife scene. This allured Marina with an infectious disco-pop track which brought out a sharp-edged interpolation of "I Will Survive" (1978) by American singer Gloria Gaynor. The next song, it was given a different perspective of Marina for "Adult Girl" as a ballad, showcasing her vulnerability through adulthood in reality. With the deep confessional lyricism and "stripped-down" production, she also finds it troubling in letting go of her late childhood, but will see growth from it. The album concludes with the playful nature of "Final Boss", with various metaphors in old school gaming with Marina referencing herself as the notorious final boss. This eventually signals the latter end ("Guess I beat you at your own game") with a comedic outro of not questioning if someone won or lost ("Game over") as she wants no one to underestimate her.

== Promotion and release ==
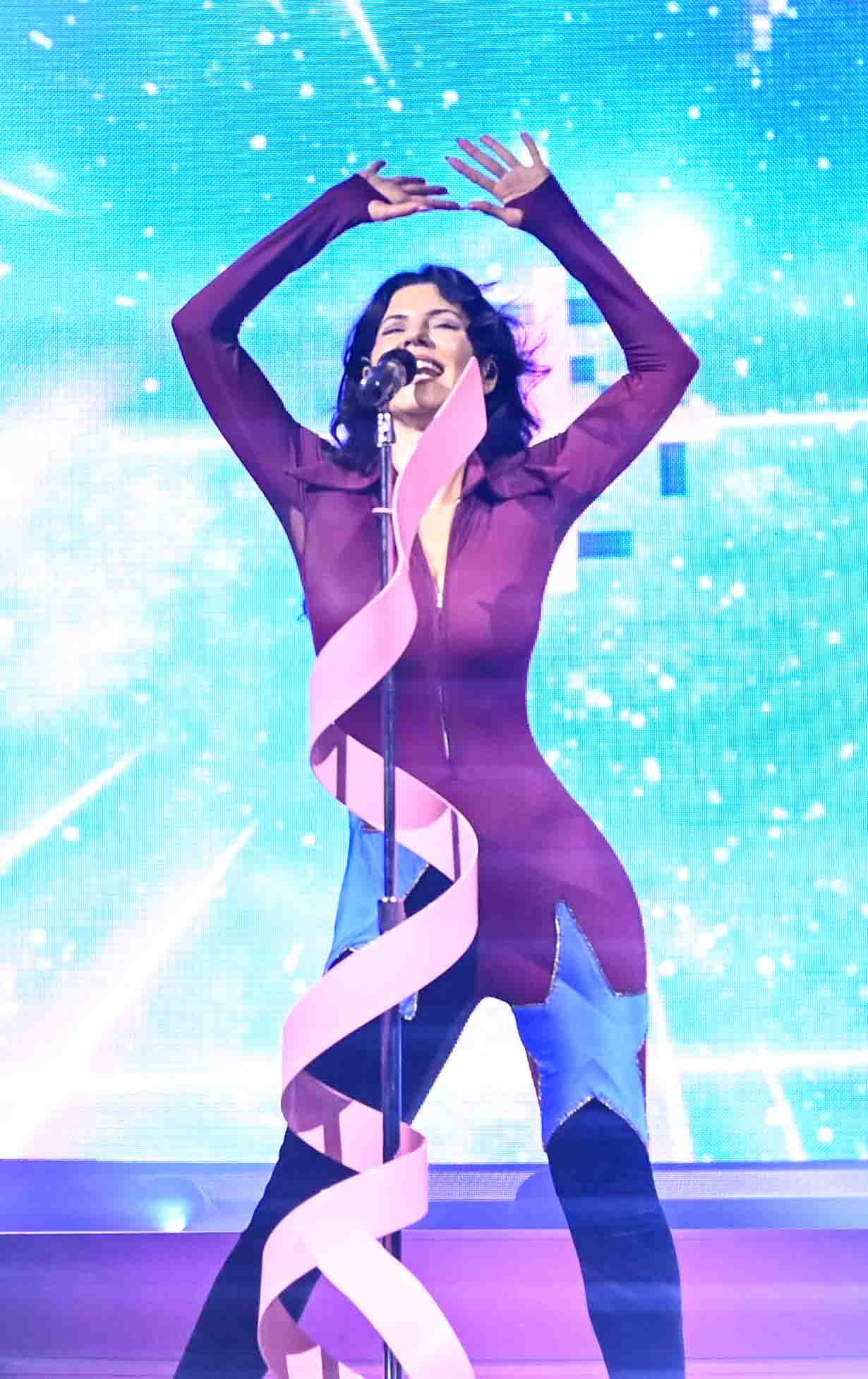
Marina performing during the Princess of Power Tour in September 2025

The studio album was preceded by the release of three singles and three music videos. It was reported that Marina began to distribute gift bags on 31 January 2025, containing living caterpillars with care instructions on how to nurture them. This "immersive campaign" culminated in its lead single titled "Butterfly" released on 21 February; an accompanying music video was released the same day directed by Aerin Moreno. "Cupid's Girl" was released as the second single on 21 March, accompanying a visualizer directed by Logan Rice. The track was met with mixed reviews with The Harvard Crimson describing the song catchy but "falls flat" leaving her audience "wanting [an] emotional depth provided by the earlier songs in her discography".

Marina soon introduced her third single, "Cuntissimo", on 10 April and released a music video the next day, directed by Olivia de Camps. V named the song as a "campy ballad in defence of female autonomy [with] touches of Victorian-era lilts." Marina name-drops Mexican actress Salma Hayek in the song ("Salma Hayek in the sun"), which caught Hayek's attention. Hayek quickly responded in a video message with excitement and thanking "for [having] my name in such an amazing song!" Marina then announced her sixth album, Princess of Power, including its artwork and an expected release date in June, and was made available for pre-order via her website and different streaming services. All three released songs were later performed live on the same day at the Coachella Valley Music and Arts Festival. This marked her first live performances of the year. Shortly after, Marina unveiled its complete track listing through social media consisting of thirteen songs on 22 April.

Princess of Power was independently released on 6 June 2025; (Note: Diamandis gave an exclusive license for Princess of Power, distributed through music company BMG Rights Management, as a partnership.) it was available worldwide for compact discs (CDs), digital download, streaming, and on vinyl records. This marked Marina's first self-released studio album since her acoustic extended play Froot (2015). To further promote her project, a music video for "I <3 You" was also released the same day; she had also performed the song live for television programme The Tonight Show Starring Jimmy Fallon. Three days later, Marina revealed her sixth concert tour of the same name and was embarked this year, from September to November, visiting arenas in North America. The tour was either supported by Australian singer Mallrat or American duo Coco and Clair Clair on selected dates. A charity fundraiser was made, where one U.S. dollar from each ticket sold will be donated through nonprofit organizations: the Trevor Project and the American Near East Refugee Aid.

A deluxe edition was released on 24 October, this included four scrapped songs, alongside a remix version of "Everybody Knows I'm Sad" with a guest appearance from British singer Absolutely. Shortly after, Marina added dates for the tour on 26 October for the United Kingdom, from May to June 2026, which is soon to be supported by American rapper Princess Nokia and Canadian singer Mikayla Geier. Further tour dates were made again on 17 November, especially for Mexico, Argentina, Chile, Colombia, and Brazil. Marina also announced on 8 December that she is scheduled to perform in three cities from Australia.

== Critical reception ==
Professional ratings
Aggregate scores
Source	Rating
Metacritic	74/100
Review scores
Source	Rating
AllMusic	3.5/5 stars
The Arts Desk	4/5 stars
Paste	7.4/10
Pitchfork	5.7/10

Princess of Power received positive reception from music critics upon its release. According to review aggregator Metacritic, which assigns a normalized rating from mainstream publications, the album received a weighted average score of 74 out of 100, based on five critic reviews.

Jem Aswad of Variety opined that the European disco-esque album flourished from its revamped electronic rhythms with "hilarious and risque lyrics." Aswad suggests that, whilst most artists of a similar age see their career's "leveling off," this album shows that "Marina's [career] is finally beginning for real." Liam Hess from Vogue also gave a cognate review, believing the artist's "newfound sense of freedom and purpose" after exiting her former record label. Hess saw how Princess of Power returned to its "most playful provocateur" of pop music, showcasing roguish behaviour and "self-possession". Victoria Wasylak for Paste, acknowledges how the album goes through Marina's stages of life, between two different mindsets of its "cutesy simplicity and heel-on-your-neck assertion." Wasylak continues that it shows a "level of aggression" calling back to artist's iconic "Bubblegum Bitch" (2012) attitude, giving such a "vibrant" angle to synth-pop through this album.

Pitchfork somewhat gave a mixed review acknowledging the returning themes of feminism, seeing the similarity of Electra Heart, yet being a maximalist disco-pop record. Jaeden Pinder felt that every track "rolled off a conveyor belt" with the songwriting falling into a "childlike cliché."

== Commercial performance ==
Princess of Power debuted at number seven in the United Kingdom (Official Albums Chart), Marina's home country, which is considerably higher than her previous studio album which peaked at number seventeen. It also marked her first album to debut at number three on the Independent Albums chart. It was moderately successful across Europe, reaching the top twenty in Austria (number 15), Germany (number 14), the Netherlands (number 13), and Switzerland (number 14). According to Hits, the album had garnered over 200 million streams globally through various music streaming services.

In the United States, the album debuted at number forty-two on the Billboard 200, consisting of approximately 10,000 pure album sales (reported by Luminate). It had also reached number two on the Top Dance Albums component chart, but was blocked by American singer Lady Gaga with her seventh studio album, Mayhem (2025), from landing the number one spot.

== Track listing ==
All songs were written and produced by Marina Diamandis and Christopher John Baran, except where noted.

Standard edition
No.	Title	Writer(s)	Producer(s)	Length
1.	"Princess of Power"		CJ Baran	4:09
2.	"Butterfly"	Marina Diamandis		4:25
3.	"Cuntissimo"	Diamandis		4:00
4.	"Rollercoaster"	Diamandis		3:03
5.	"Cupid's Girl"			3:28
6.	"Metallic Stallion"			4:15
7.	"Je ne sais quoi"		Baran	3:33
8.	"Digital Fantasy"			3:19
9.	"Everybody Knows I'm Sad"	Diamandis		4:07
10.	"Hello Kitty"		Baran	3:30
11.	"I <3 You"		Baran	3:36
12.	"Adult Girl"			3:04
13.	"Final Boss"			3:10
Total length:				47:39

Deluxe edition
No.	Title	Writer(s)	Producer(s)	Length
14.	"Sex Is Power"			3:39
15.	"How to Say Goodbye"		Baran	3:44
16.	"Key to the Castle"		Baran	2:48
17.	"Unfamiliar Heavens"			3:48
18.	"Everybody Knows I'm Sad" (featuring Absolutely)	Diamandis; Abby-Lynn Keen		4:08
Total length:				65:45

== Personnel ==
Credits were adapted from the liner notes.

Musicians

- Marina Diamandis – lead vocals (all tracks); keyboards, synthesizer (tracks 2, 4, 9, 13)
- CJ Baran – programming, synthesizer (tracks 1–11, 13); drums, Mellotron (1–4, 6, 7, 11); string arrangement (1–3, 6–9, 11, 13), guitar (5–7, 10, 11, 13), drum programming (5, 8, 10, 13), piano (12)
- Paul Cartwright – string arrangement, string orchestra, violin (tracks 1, 3, 6, 9, 11)
- Nolan Markey – orchestral conductor (tracks 1, 3, 6, 9, 11)
- Charles Tyler – cello (tracks 1, 3, 6, 9, 11)
- Timothy Loo – cello (tracks 1, 3, 6, 9, 11)
- David Walther – viola (tracks 1, 3, 6, 9, 11)
- Luke Maurer – viola (tracks 1, 3, 6, 9, 11)
- Marta Honer– viola (tracks 1, 3, 6, 9, 11)
- Ashoka Thiagarajan – violin (tracks 1, 3, 6, 9, 11)
- Ben Jacobson – violin (tracks 1, 3, 6, 9, 11)
- Ina Veli – violin (tracks 1, 3, 6, 9, 11)
- Joel Pargman – violin (tracks 1, 3, 6, 9, 11)
- Luanne Homzy – violin (tracks 1, 3, 6, 9, 11)
- Mary Kathleen Sloan – violin (tracks 1, 3, 6, 9, 11)

Technical

- Nathan Dantzler – mastering
- Mitch McCarthy – mixing
- CJ Baran – engineering
- Nick Trapani – additional vocal engineering, editing
- Sean Gehricke – engineering (tracks 1, 3, 6, 9, 11)
- Adam Michalak – additional recording (tracks 1, 3, 6, 9, 11)

== Charts ==
Chart performance for Princess of Power
Chart (2025)	Peak position
Australian Albums (ARIA)	69
Austrian Albums (Ö3 Austria)	15
Belgian Albums (Ultratop Flanders)	37
Belgian Albums (Ultratop Wallonia)	34
Croatian International Albums (HDU)	23
Dutch Albums (Album Top 100)	13
Finnish Albums (Suomen virallinen lista)	41
French Albums (SNEP)	112
German Albums (Offizielle Top 100)	14
Hungarian Physical Albums (MAHASZ)	34
Irish Albums (Official Charts)	30
New Zealand Albums (RMNZ)	28
Polish Streaming Albums (ZPAV)	61
Portuguese Albums (AFP)	73
Scottish Albums (Official Charts)	6
Spanish Albums (PROMUSICAE)	65
Swiss Albums (Schweizer Hitparade)	14
UK Albums (Official Charts)	7
UK Independent Albums (Official Charts)	3
US Billboard 200	42
US Independent Albums (Billboard)	7
US Top Dance/Electronic Albums (Billboard)	2

== Release history ==
List of release dates, editions, and formats
Region	Date	Format(s)	Edition	Labels	Ref.
Various	6 June 2025	CD; digital download; streaming; vinyl	Standard	Queenie; BMG	
Various	24 October 2025	Digital download; streaming	Deluxe	Queenie; BMG	
Various	30 January 2026	Vinyl	Deluxe	Queenie; BMG	
