= CJ Baran =

American singer, songwriter and producer

- Also known as: Woolf & The Wondershow
- Born: Christopher John Baran; February 13, 1990 (age 36); Melville, New York, U.S.
- Genres: Alternative pop; pop; alternative; rock
- Occupations: Singer; songwriter; record producer
- Instrument: Guitar
- Years active: 2006–present
- Labels: Pulse Music Group, MXM Music, VAMP, Sony Music Publishing

Christopher John Baran (born February 13, 1990) is an American record producer and songwriter based in Los Angeles. He is known for his work with artists including Melanie Martinez, Carly Rae Jepsen, Panic! at the Disco, Marina, and Nessa Barrett, among many others. He is a founding member of theatre company Woolf and the Wondershow and co-writer, creator, and producer of their Los Angeles future theater musical Cages.

== Early life ==
Baran is originally from Melville, New York, where he took an early interest in music, learning several instruments and beginning his first band at 11, Kaution.

== Career ==
Baran joined Steve Scarola, Nick DeTurris and Derek Ries to form Push Play. Baran was lead vocalist, keyboard player, and rhythm guitarist for the Long Island-based band. They recorded their debut album in Baran's basement, before receiving a record deal from Wind-Up Records and Sony Music. Following a tour with the band, Baran realized he preferred to make music rather than tour and moved to Los Angeles to pursue a career in production. Baran went on to sign with Pulse Recording for his writing and production work in 2011. In 2013, Baran met producer Max Martin, who brought Baran on to his recording company, MXM. Baran was co-signed with both Pulse and MXM from 2015 to 2023.

Baran initially received critical acclaim for his work on Carly Rae Jepsen's Emotion album, which Billboard ranked as the second best pop album of the year, behind 25 by Adele. He wrote and produced Panic! at the Disco's "Victorious", which peaked at No. 89 on the Billboard Hot 100 in late 2015. The song is part of the Grammy-nominated album, Death of a Bachelor, which reached number one on the Billboard 200 in January 2016. Baran co-wrote and produced Melanie Martinez's "Pity Party", which was certified 2× platinum by the RIAA in 2021. The song was the lead single from Martinez's album Cry Baby, which peaked at number six on the Billboard 200. He also provided music for the TV series Empire, most notably his song "Do It" featuring Becky G.

In 2015, Baran and composer Benjamin Romans set out to combine forces and create a genre bending multimedia musical as Woolf and the Wondershow. They began performing their future theater show Cages in a converted warehouse in the Arts District of Downtown Los Angeles. Baran and Romans co-wrote the music and lyrics as well as co-directed. For the LA run, Baran performed live on stage as main character Woolf, while Romans performed the live score. The show was a first of its kind, blending ghost holograms interacting with live actors using projection mapping. The show was successful, enjoying a six-month run of sold-out performances, before being halted due to the COVID-19 pandemic. Cages returned in late 2021, with the release of an official soundtrack recording and film. The show received an additional run of London performances in 2022. Cages has been noted as an innovative experience that blends Broadway, pop music and film, and was called "groundbreaking" by the Los Angeles Times. As described by Forbes, Cages "is breathtaking...one part Les Mis, another part Kanye West, a dash of Broadway here, and a sprinkle of cinema there - all mixed together in an entirely new kind of immersive blender complete with earth-shattering sound."

In 2023, Baran executive produced Melanie Martinez's third album, Portals, which reached number two on the Billboard 200. His work on Portals positioned him at number one on the weekly Billboard Alternative Producers Chart for two weeks. Following Portals, Baran also executive produced and co-wrote every track on Martinez's fourth album, Hades, released in 2026, which peaked at number four on the Billboard 200 and number one on Billboard's Top Rock & Alternative Albums chart. His work on the album earned him a second top-five placement on the Billboard Alternative Producers Chart. Baran has expanded his creative partnership with Martinez, becoming her musical director for subsequent live engagements, most notably the 2026 Hades: The Sacrifice Tour. He also executive produced Marina's sixth album Princess of Power in 2025 and Nessa Barrett's albums Aftercare and Tough Love, as well as the EP Jesus Loves a Primadonna.

In 2023, Baran founded his own production and publishing company, VAMP, focused on world-building and creating niches in the alternative genre. The name is a multi-acronym for "very alternative music publishing" and "very alternative music production". In 2025, he signed a new deal with Sony Music Publishing in partnership with VAMP.

== Selected production & songwriting discography ==
Year	Artist	Song	Album
2026	Carly Rae Jepsen	"Don't Leave Me on the Dance Floor"	Day and Night
2026	Melanie Martinez	"GARBAGE"	HADES
2026	Melanie Martinez	"IS THIS A CULT?"	HADES
2026	Melanie Martinez	"WHITE BOY WITH A GUN"	HADES
2026	Melanie Martinez	"GRUDGES"	HADES
2026	Melanie Martinez	"MONOPOLY MAN"	HADES
2026	Melanie Martinez	"AVOIDANT"	HADES
2026	Melanie Martinez	"MONOLITH"	HADES
2026	Melanie Martinez	"WEIGHT WATCHERS"	HADES
2026	Melanie Martinez	"THE PLAGUE"	HADES
2026	Melanie Martinez	"BATSHIT INTELLIGENCE"	HADES
2026	Melanie Martinez	"GUTTER"	HADES
2026	Melanie Martinez	"UNCANNY VALLEY"	HADES
2026	Melanie Martinez	"THE VATICAN"	HADES
2026	Melanie Martinez	"HELL'S FRONT PORCH"	HADES
2026	Melanie Martinez	"CHATROOM"	HADES
2026	Melanie Martinez	"THE LAST TWO PEOPLE ON EARTH"	HADES
2026	Melanie Martinez	"DISNEY PRINCESS"	HADES
2026	Melanie Martinez	"POSSESSION"	HADES
2026	Nessa Barrett	“West Coast Prayer”	Jesus loves a primadonna
2026	Nessa Barrett	"’Til Death Do Us Part"	Jesus loves a primadonna
2026	Nessa Barrett	"Black Haired Madonna"	Jesus loves a primadonna
2026	Nessa Barrett	"Venom"	Jesus loves a primadonna
2026	Nessa Barrett	"Buffalo 66"	Jesus loves a primadonna
2026	Nessa Barrett	"High On Heaven"	Jesus loves a primadonna
2026	Nessa Barrett	"Special To You"	Jesus loves a primadonna
2026	Nessa Barrett	"Stay With Me"	Jesus loves a primadonna
2026	Nessa Barrett	"Too Fast To Live, Too Young To Die"	Tough Love
2026	Nessa Barrett	"Bad Girls Never Die"	Tough Love
2026	Nessa Barrett	"Tough Love"	Tough Love
2026	Nessa Barrett	"Dracula"	Tough Love
2026	Nessa Barrett	"Fetish"	Tough Love
2026	Nessa Barrett	"Only For You"	Tough Love
2026	Nessa Barrett	"Glamorous"	Tough Love
2026	Nessa Barrett	"Coming Home Again"	Tough Love
2026	Nessa Barrett	"Bunny"	Tough Love
2026	Nessa Barrett	"Candy"	Tough Love
2026	Nessa Barrett	"God Gave Me Expensive Taste"	Tough Love
2025	Carly Rae Jepsen	"More"	Emotion (10th Anniversary Edition)
2025	Isabel LaRosa	"Her Face"	N/A
2025	Mollie Elizabeth	"The Disappearing Girl"	N/A
2025	MARINA	"SEX IS POWER"	PRINCESS OF POWER (DELUXE)
2025	MARINA	"HOW TO SAY GOODBYE"	PRINCESS OF POWER (DELUXE)
2025	MARINA	"KEYS TO THE CASTLE"	PRINCESS OF POWER (DELUXE)
2025	MARINA	"UNFAMILIAR HEAVENS"	PRINCESS OF POWER (DELUXE)
2025	MARINA	"PRINCESS OF POWER"	PRINCESS OF POWER
2025	MARINA	"BUTTERFLY"	PRINCESS OF POWER
2025	MARINA	"CUNTISSIMO"	PRINCESS OF POWER
2025	MARINA	"ROLLERCOASTER"	PRINCESS OF POWER
2025	MARINA	"CUPID'S GIRL"	PRINCESS OF POWER
2025	MARINA	"METALLIC STALLION"	PRINCESS OF POWER
2025	MARINA	"JE NE SAIS QUOI"	PRINCESS OF POWER
2025	MARINA	"DIGITAL FANTASY"	PRINCESS OF POWER
2025	MARINA	"EVERYBODY KNOWS I'M SAD"	PRINCESS OF POWER
2025	MARINA	"HELLO KITTY"	PRINCESS OF POWER
2025	MARINA	"I <3 YOU"	PRINCESS OF POWER
2025	MARINA	"ADULT GIRL"	PRINCESS OF POWER
2025	MARINA	"FINAL BOSS"	PRINCESS OF POWER
2025	Carmen DeLeon	"Wonderful"	N/A
2025	The Living Tombstone	"Kill Us All"	Rust
2025	The Living Tombstone	"Be Alone"	Rust
2025	The Living Tombstone	"I Walk Ahead Of You"	Rust
2025	The Living Tombstone	"Somebody"	Rust
2025	The Living Tombstone	"Rust"	Rust
2025	The Living Tombstone	"Boulder"	Rust
2025	The Living Tombstone	"Orphans"	Rust
2025	The Living Tombstone	'Goliath"	Rust
2025	The Living Tombstone	"Malibu Pier"	Rust
2025	The Living Tombstone	"This Will Be Our Year"	Rust
2025	Nessa Barrett	"KEEP YOUR EYES ON ME BOY"	AFTERCARE DELUXE
2025	Nessa Barrett	"BREAKFAST IN BED"	AFTERCARE DELUXE
2024	Nessa Barrett	"AFTERCARE"	Aftercare ^{[a]}
2024	Nessa Barrett	"PORNSTAR"	Aftercare ^{[a]}
2024	Nessa Barrett	"HEARTBEAT"	Aftercare ^{[a]}
2024	Nessa Barrett	"DISCO (feat. Tommy Genesis)"	Aftercare ^{[a]}
2024	Nessa Barrett	"RUSSIAN ROULETTE"	Aftercare ^{[a]}
2024	Nessa Barrett	"BABYDOLL"	Aftercare ^{[a]}
2024	Nessa Barrett	"GIVEN ENOUGH"	Aftercare ^{[a]}
2024	Nessa Barrett	"EDWARD SCISSORHANDS"	Aftercare ^{[a]}
2024	Nessa Barrett	"GLITTER AND VIOLENCE"	Aftercare ^{[a]}
2024	Nessa Barrett	"PINS AND NEEDLES"	Aftercare ^{[a]}
2024	Nessa Barrett	"STAY ALIVE"	Aftercare ^{[a]}
2024	Nessa Barrett	"DIRTY LITTLE SECRET"	Aftercare ^{[a]}
2024	COIN	"Growing Song"	I'm Not Afraid of Music Anymore
2024	Zinadelphia	"Knock The Wind"	The Magazine
2024	Mars Argo	"Lick It Like A Kitten"	I Can Only Be Me EP
2024	Baby Storme	"Rest In Pieces"	N/A
2024	Noga Erez	"AYAYAY"	THE VANDALIST
2024	Noga Erez	"Come Back Home"	THE VANDALIST
2024	Caity Baser	"I'm A Problem"	Still Learning
2024	bludnymph	"The Things I Do For Love"	N/A
2023	Melanie Martinez	"DEATH"	PORTALS ^{[a]}
2023	Melanie Martinez	"VOID"	PORTALS ^{[a]}
2023	Melanie Martinez	"TUNNEL VISION"	PORTALS ^{[a]}
2023	Melanie Martinez	"FAERIE SOIRÉE"	PORTALS ^{[a]}
2023	Melanie Martinez	"LIGHT SHOWER"	PORTALS ^{[a]}
2023	Melanie Martinez	"SPIDER WEB"	PORTALS ^{[a]}
2023	Melanie Martinez	"LEECHES"	PORTALS ^{[a]}
2023	Melanie Martinez	"BATTLE OF THE LARYNX"	PORTALS ^{[a]}
2023	Melanie Martinez	"THE CONTORTIONIST"	PORTALS ^{[a]}
2023	Melanie Martinez	"MOON CYCLE"	PORTALS ^{[a]}
2023	Melanie Martinez	"NYMPHOLOGY"	PORTALS ^{[a]}
2023	Melanie Martinez	"EVIL"	PORTALS ^{[a]}
2023	Melanie Martinez	"WOMB"	PORTALS ^{[a]}
2023	Melanie Martinez	"POWDER"	PORTALS (Deluxe)
2023	Melanie Martinez	"PLUTO"	PORTALS (Deluxe)
2023	Baby Storme	"Sunglasses At Night"	Forever Halloween
2023	Baby Storme	"This City is a Graveyard"	N/A
2023	Mars Argo	"I Can Only Be Me"	I Can Only Be Me EP
2022	Woolf and the Wondershow	CAGES (Official Cast Recording) ^{[a]}	
2022	ONE OK ROCK	"When They Turn the Lights On"	Luxury Disease
2022	Chicago	"You've Got To Believe"	Born For This Moment
2022	Chicago	"If This Is Goodbye"	Born For This Moment
2022	Mars Argo	"Angry"	I Can Only Be Me EP
2022	Au/Ra	"plz don't waste my youth"	N/A
2021	Au/Ra	"Bite Marks"	N/A
2021	Darren Criss	"let's"	Masquerade
2021	Darren Criss	"walk of shame"	Masquerade
2021	Darren Criss	"f*kn around"	Masquerade
2021	Darren Criss	"for a night like this"	Masquerade
2021	Darren Criss	"i can't dance"	Masquerade
2020	Aly & AJ	"Attack of Panic"	We Don't Stop
2020	Aly & AJ	"Joan of Arc on the Dance Floor"	We Don't Stop
2020	Carly Rae Jepsen	"It's Not Christmas Til Somebody Cries"	N/A
2020	Carly Rae Jepsen	"Let's Be Friends"	Dedicated Side B (Japan Edition)
2020	Carly Rae Jepsen	"Always On My Mind"	Dedicated Side B (Japan Edition)
2020	COIN	"Cemetery"	Cemetery
2019	K.Flay	"Only The Dark"	Solutions
2019	Carly Rae Jepsen	"Everything He Needs"	Dedicated
2019	Kailee Morgue, Hayley Kiyoko	"Headcase"	N/A
2019	ONE OK ROCK	"Grow Old Die Young"	Eye of the Storm
2018	Kailee Morgue	"Medusa"	Medusa
2018	Kailee Morgue	"Discovery"	Medusa
2017	COIN	"Talk Too Much"	How Will You Know If You Never Try
2017	Betty Who	"Mama Say"	The Valley
2017	Andrew McMahon in the Wilderness	"So Close"	Zombies on Broadway
2017	ONE OK ROCK	"One Way Ticket"	Ambitions
2016	Carly Rae Jepsen	"Store"	EMOTION SIDE B
2016	Nelly, Simple Plan	"I Don't Wanna Go to Bed"	Taking One for the Team
2015	Panic! at the Disco	"Victorious"	Death of a Bachelor
2015	Pentatonix	"Cracked"	Pentatonix (album)
2015	Melanie Martinez	"Pity Party"	Cry Baby
2015	Melanie Martinez	"Cake"	Cry Baby
2015	Hilary Duff	"Rebel Hearts"	Breathe In. Breathe Out.
2015	MIKA	"Promiseland"	No Place In Heaven
2015	Bea Miller	"Dracula"	Not An Apology
2015	Carly Rae Jepsen	"Emotion"	E•MO•TION
2015	Carly Rae Jepsen	"Let's Get Lost"	E•MO•TION
2015	Carly Rae Jepsen	"Love Again"	E•MO•TION (Deluxe Expanded Edition)
2014	The Vamps	"Lovestruck"	Meet The Vamps
2014	The Cab	"These Are The Lies"	Lock Me Up
2011	Pixie Lott	"Everybody Hurts Sometimes"	Young Foolish Happy
2011	Pixie Lott	"Till The Sun Comes Out"	Young Foolish Happy

Notes

- ^{^[a]} signifies an executive producer credit
