= Kailee Morgue =

American singer-songwriter (born 1998)

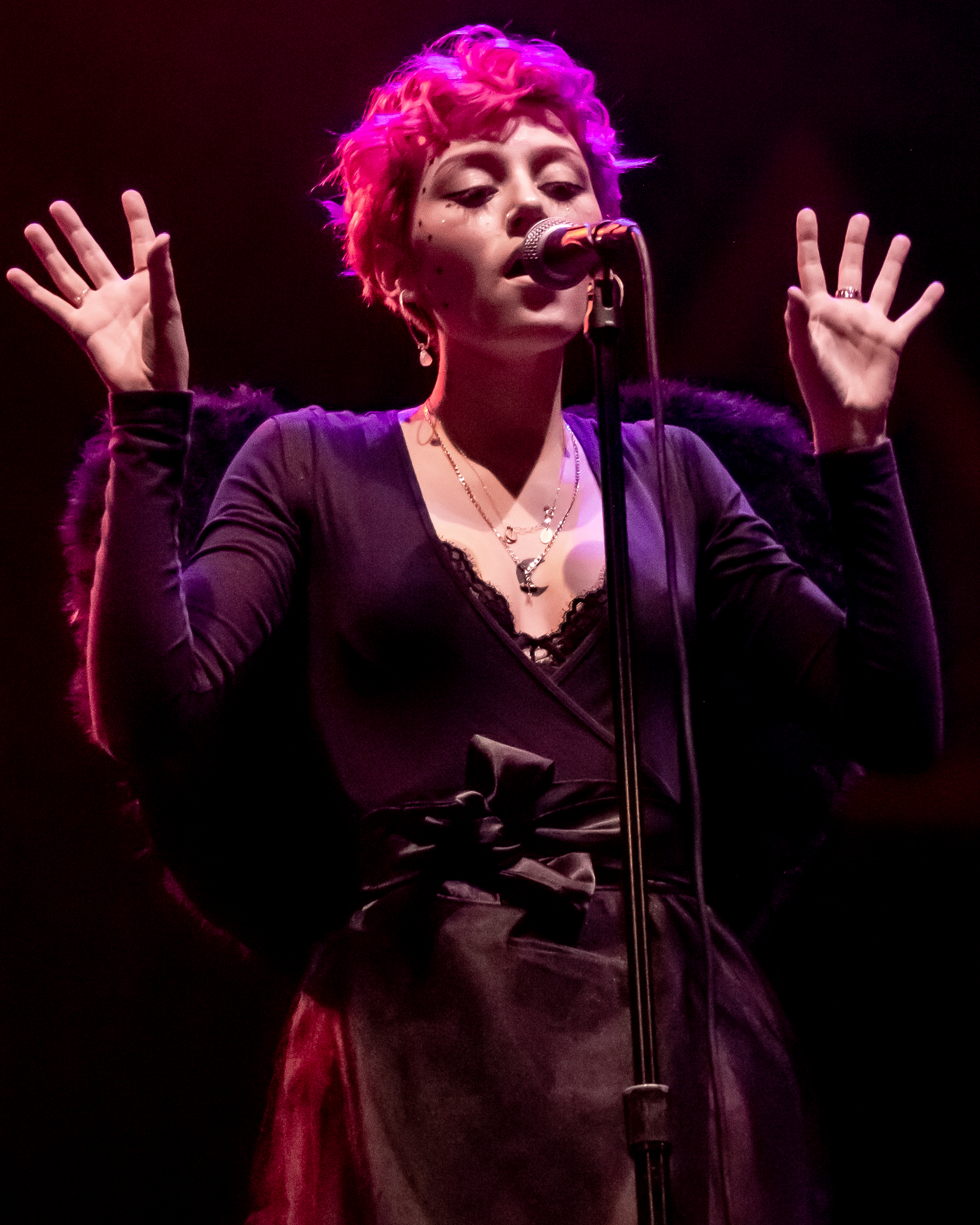
- Morgue performing in 2018

Background information
- Born: Kailee Nicole Moore; July 15, 1998 (age 28); Phoenix, Arizona, U.S.
- Genre: Pop rock
- Occupation: Singer-songwriter
- Years active: 2017–present
- Labels: Republic; Thriller

Kailee Nicole Moore (born July 15, 1998), professionally known as Kailee Morgue, is an American singer-songwriter.

== Career ==
Kailee first began posting on her YouTube channel in late 2015, and started with covers of songs. Her most popular cover being "Spirit Desire" by Tigers Jaw. In January 2017, Morgue tweeted a preview of "Medusa" that went viral. Later that year, Morgue signed a deal with Republic Records. A music video for "Medusa" was released in October 2017. She worked with producer CJ Baran to develop a final version of the song. Morgue performed at her first music festival, Outside Lands Music and Arts Festival in August 2018. In 2018, Morgue released the single "Siren" continuing the Greek mythology theme to her songs such as "Medusa."

== Artistry ==
Highsnobiety described Morgue as a mix of goth and punk. She cites Gwen Stefani and Avril Lavigne as early influences. Atwood Magazine described Morgue's singing as a mixture of light and dark "like a dream within a nightmare, or vice versa."

== Reception ==
Sydney Gore of MTV called Morgue an "emerging pop star" after the release of her EP, Medusa.

== Discography ==
=== Albums ===
- Girl Next Door (2022)

=== Extended plays ===
- Medusa (2018)
- Here in Your Bedroom (2020)

=== Other recordings ===
- "Unfortunate Soul"
- "Ghost of Mine"
- "F**K U"
- "Discovery"
- "Intuition"
- "Antidote" featuring Magnolia Park

=== Singles ===
- "June"
- "Signs"
- "Medusa" (2018)
- "Do You Feel This Way"
- "Siren" (2018)
- “Black Sheep” (2019)
- "Headcase" featuring Hayley Kiyoko (2019)
- "Knew You" (2020)
- "Butterflies" (2021)
- "Another Day In Paradise" (2022)
- "Loser" (2022)
- "Trainwreck" (2022)
- "In my Head" featured by Mike Shinoda (2023)

== Personal life ==
Morgue is based in Los Angeles. She is openly queer and pansexual. She practiced witchcraft for seven years but in August 2023, denounced witchcraft and announced that she was a born again Christian. Her favorite fictional character is Sailor Moon. In January 2024, she announced she was pregnant in a post on her TikTok account.

Morgue came under fire in January 2024 for following alt-right Twitter accounts posting racist, homophobic, anti-semitic and transphobic content.
