= Mikayla Geier =

Canadian singer-songwriter

- Born: June 10, 1999 (age 27); Vancouver, British Columbia, Canada
- Genre: Alternative pop
- Occupation: Singer-songwriter
- Years active: 2019-present
- Label: AWAL

Mikayla Geier is a Canadian singer-songwriter. She has become known for her alternative pop songs, including "I Don't Feel Safe in My Body," "Paris," and "Piano in the Sky". She released her debut studio album here we go again... in 2024, followed by her second album HOT POT! in 2025.

== Life and career ==
Geier was born in Vancouver, British Columbia. She studied ballet at the Kirov Academy of Ballet in Washington, D.C., but ultimately decided not to pursue a career in ballet, citing the intense demands on her body and her struggle with anorexia nervosa. She later attended Indiana University Bloomington, studying entrepreneurship and corporate innovation at the Kelley School of Business and ballet at the Jacobs School of Music. She released her first extended play (EP), Bloomington on November 8, 2019, while still attending university. Geier relocated to Los Angeles in 2022 and released her debut studio album, Here We Go Again..., on August 23, 2024. The album included the singles "Paris," "Dance of the Trees" and "I Don't Feel Safe in My Body", the last two of which were produced by Joe Janiak. The latter was written about her experiences as a professional ballet dancer and her experiences with anorexia.

Geier released the song "Piano in the Sky" on June 17, 2025, which David Sosa of Grimy Goods described as "a short and sweet jam for her growing catalog." The track was followed up by "Dirty Shirley" and "No Thoughts", alongside which Geier announced her first North American tour, the Diva Tour. She then released the song "Diva". All of the songs are set to be included on her second studio album, Hot Pot!.

On October 27, 2025, Marina Diamandis announced that Mikayla would be her UK opener for The Princess of Power Tour. She was named one of the Spotify Artists To Watch for 2026.

== Discography ==
=== Studio albums ===
Title	Details
Here We Go Again...	Released: August 23, 2024; Label: AWAL; Formats: Digital download, streaming
Hot Pot!	Released: October 29, 2025; Label: AWAL; Formats: Digital download, streaming

=== Extended play ===
Title	Details
Bloomington	Released: November 8, 2019; Label: AWAL; Formats: Digital download, streaming

=== Singles ===
Title	Year	Album
"The Sorry Song"	2019	Bloomington
"Deja You"	2019	Bloomington
"Second Place" (with Loyalties and Stringer)	2021	Non-album single
"Dance of the Trees"	2024	Here We Go Again...
"Here We Go Again..."	2024	Here We Go Again...
"I Don't Feel Safe in My Body"	2024	Here We Go Again...
"Paris"	2024	Here We Go Again...
"Piano in the Sky"	2025	Hot Pot!
"Dirty Shirley"	2025	Hot Pot!
"No Thoughts"	2025	Hot Pot!
"Diva"	2025	Hot Pot!
"Hotline"	2026	Non-album single
