= The Princess of Power Tour =

2025–2026 concert tour by Marina

- Tour by Marina
- Marina at the Princess of Power tour.
- Location: Europe; North America; Oceania; South America
- Associated album: Princess of Power
- Start date: September 6, 2025
- End date: August 14, 2026
- No. of shows: 43
- Supporting acts: Coco & Clair Clair; Mallrat; Mikayla Geier; Princess Nokia·; MAY-A

Marina concert chronology
- Ancient Dreams in a Modern Land Tour (2022); The Princess of Power Tour (2025–2026)

The Princess of Power Tour was the sixth concert tour by Welsh singer and songwriter Marina, to further promote her sixth studio album Princess of Power (2025). It commenced on 6 September 2025 at the Showbox SoDo in Seattle, United States, and concluded on 14 August 2026 at the Flow Festival in Helsinki, Finland.

== Announcements ==
On June 9, 2025, Marina announced that she would embark on the Princess of Power Tour with twenty-five dates across North America, marking her sixth concert tour. The pre-sale and general sale dates were announced concurrently. Pre-sales started on June 11, while general sales started on June 13, 2025. Coco & Clair Clair and Mallrat served as the opening acts for various dates throughout the tour.

On Monday 27 October 2025, Marina announced the tour would extend into 2026, adding UK dates. Pre-sale started on Wednesday 29 October with general sales on Friday 31 October, 2025. Mikayla Geier and Princess Nokia served as opening acts across various dates throughout the tour. In November 2025, Latin American dates were added, along with two additional Mexico dates were announced for 2026. In December 2025, France, Spain and Australian dates were added for 2026. and was Marina's first tour to Australia in 15 years since The Family Jewels Tour. MAY-A served as the opening act for the Melbourne show. In March 2026, the San Diego, United States show was announced. In June 2026, Marina announced the final show for the tour would be in Helsinki, Finland.

== Tour dates ==
List of 2025 concerts
| Date | City | Country | Venue | Opening act(s) | Attendance | Revenue |
|---|---|---|---|---|---|---|
| September 6 | Seattle | United States | Showbox SoDo | Coco & Clair Clair | – | – |
| September 7 | Vancouver | Canada | Orpheum Theatre | Coco & Clair Clair | – | – |
| September 10 | Portland | United States | Keller Auditorium | Coco & Clair Clair | – | – |
| September 12 | Salt Lake City | United States | The Union | Coco & Clair Clair | – | – |
| September 13 | Denver | United States | Fillmore Auditorium | Coco & Clair Clair | – | – |
| September 15 | Minneapolis | United States | The Filmore | Mallrat | – | – |
| September 16 | Royal Oak | United States | Royal Oak Music Theatre | Mallrat | – | – |
| September 18 | Toronto | Canada | History | Mallrat | – | – |
| September 20 | New Haven | United States | College Street Music Hall | Mallrat | – | – |
| September 21 | Boston | United States | Roadrunner | Mallrat | – | – |
| September 24 | Philadelphia | United States | Franklin Music Hall | Mallrat | – | – |
| September 25 | New York City | United States | Radio City Music Hall | Mallrat | – | – |
| September 28 (Note: The September 28, 2025, concert was a part of All Things Go Music Festival.) | Columbia | United States | Merriweather Post Pavilion | —N/a | —N/a | —N/a |
| September 29 | Pittsburgh | United States | Stage AE | Mallrat | – | – |
| October 1 | Nashville | United States | The Pinnacle | Mallrat | – | – |
| October 2 | Atlanta | United States | The Eastern | Mallrat | – | – |
| October 4 (Note: The October 4, 2025, concert was a part of Austin City Limits Music Festival.) | Austin | United States | Zilker Park | —N/a | —N/a | —N/a |
| October 5 | Austin | United States | Moody Theater | Mallrat | – | – |
| October 7 | Houston | United States | Bayou Music Center | Mallrat | – | – |
| October 9 | Dallas | United States | Southside Ballroom | Mallrat | – | – |
| October 11 (Note: The October 11, 2026, concert was a part of Austin City Limits Music Festival.) | Austin | United States | Zilker Park | —N/a | —N/a | —N/a |
| October 13 | Phoenix | United States | Arizona Financial Theatre | Mallrat | – | – |
| October 14 | Pomona | United States | Fox Theater | Mallrat | – | – |
| October 16 | Los Angeles | United States | Greek Theatre | Mallrat | – | – |
| October 17 | Oakland | United States | Fox Theatre | Mallrat | – | – |
| November 15 (Note: The November 15, 2025, concert was a part of Corona Capital Festival.) | Mexico City | Mexico | Autódromo Hermanos Rodríguez | —N/a | —N/a | —N/a |

List of 2026 concerts
| Date | City | Country | Venue | Opening act(s) | Attendance | Revenue |
|---|---|---|---|---|---|---|
| February 24 | Sydney | Australia | Hordern Pavilion | Mallrat | – | – |
| February 26 | Brisbane | Australia | On The Banks | Mallrat | – | – |
| February 28 | Melbourne | Australia | Palace Foreshore | MAY-A | – | – |
| March 11 | Mexico City | Mexico | Pepsi Center WTC | Nicole Horts | – | – |
| March 12 | Mexico City | Mexico | Pepsi Center WTC | Nicole Horts | – | – |
| March 14 | Buenos Aires | Argentina | Hipódromo de San Isidro | – | – | – |
| March 15 | Santiago | Chile | O'Higgins Park | – | – | – |
| March 17 | Santiago | Chile | Teatro Coliseo | – | – | – |
| March 19 | Bogotá | Colombia | Teatro Royal Center | Nicolle Hadad | – | – |
| March 21 | São Paulo | Brazil | Interlagos Circuit | – | – | – |
| May 27 | Bristol | England | Bristol Beacon | Mikayla Geier | – | – |
| May 28 | London | England | Alexandra Palace | Mikayla Geier; Princess Nokia | – | – |
| May 30 | Manchester | England | Aviva Studios | Mikayla Geier; Princess Nokia | – | – |
| June 1 | Glasgow | Scotland | O2 Academy Glasgow | Mikayla Geier | – | – |
| June 2 | Cardiff | Wales | DEPOT | Mikayla Geier | – | – |
| June 3 | Birmingham | England | O2 Academy Birmingham | Mikayla Geier | – | – |
| June 6 (Note: The June 6, 2026, concert was a part of Primavera Sound.) | Barcelona | Spain | Parc del Fòrum | – | – | – |
| June 7 (Note: The June 7, 2026, concert was a part of We Love Green.) | Paris | France | Bois de Vincennes | – | – | – |
| July 19 (Note: The July 19, 2026, concert is set to be a part of San Diego Pride) | San Diego | United States | Balboa Park | – | – | – |
| August 14 (Note: The August 14, 2026, concert is set to be a part of Flow Festival.) | Helsinki | Finland | Suvilahti | – | – | – |
