= Cupid's Girl =

2025 single by Marina

Single by Marina

from the album Princess of Power
- Released: 21 March 2025
- Genre: Synth-pop; electropop; darkwave
- Length: 3:29
- Label: Queenie; BMG
- Songwriter: Marina Diamandis
- Producers: Marina; CJ Baran

Marina singles chronology
"Butterfly" (2025)	"Cupid's Girl" (2025)	"Cuntissimo" (2025)

Visualiser
- "Cupid's Girl" on YouTube

"Cupid's Girl" is a song by Welsh singer-songwriter Marina, released as the second single from her sixth studio album, Princess of Power (2025). Independently released on 21 March 2025, through Queenie Records under exclusive license to BMG Rights Management (UK) Limited, it follows her previous single, "Butterfly", marking a continuation of her self-released work since her early extended plays, Mermaid vs Sailor (2007) and Froot Acoustic (2015).

The accompanying visualizer, directed by Logan Rice, presents Marina in a yellow skirt and blue corset top, aiming a bow and arrow—an outfit reminiscent of Snow White's look. This visual metaphorically represents Marina's readiness to embrace a new era in her music career.

== Composition ==
Rolling Stone describes "Cupid's Girl" as "synth-forward". The song is described as a "dance-y cut" and a "synth-based electro-pop track" by Flood Magazine and Stereoboard, respectively.

Atwood Magazine describes the song as a "vibrant" synth-pop anthem and said it "takes the form of an infectious, high-energy dance track, drawing from the realms of electro-pop, new rave, and even a touch of darkwave. The backdrop is lush and vibrant, with an electrifying pulse that will have you tapping your feet and nodding along before you even realize it."

== Reception ==
Atwood Magazine said the song "showcases her playful, empowered approach to love, marking the beginning of an exciting new era in her music". A writer for The Harvard Crimson said the song "falls flat" and "doesn't offer a societal critique to be presented through a kitschy persona, nor does it explore any personal vulnerabilities. While these features are not necessary for a hit song, the single leaves long-time Marina listeners underwhelmed, missing the poignancy and emotionality that oftentimes accompany her older work." The review ended, "Ultimately, although the lyrics leave the audience wanting for a bit more of the emotional depth provided by the earlier songs in her discography, the tell-tale sound of Marina's new single ... remains just as catchy as ever."

== Charts ==
Chart performances for "Cupid's Girl"
Chart (2025)	Peak position
UK Singles Downloads (Official Charts)	72
UK Singles Sales (OCC)	77
