= Cuntissimo =

2025 single by Marina

Single by Marina

from the album Princess of Power
- Released: 10 April 2025
- Genre: Techno-pop; electropop
- Length: 4:00
- Label: Queenie; BMG
- Songwriter: Marina Diamandis
- Producers: Marina; CJ Baran

Marina singles chronology
"Cupid's Girl" (2025)	"Cuntissimo" (2025)

Music video
- "Cuntissimo" on YouTube

"Cuntissimo" is a song by Welsh singer and songwriter Marina from her sixth studio album, Princess of Power (2025). It was independently released as the third single on 10 April 2025, (Note: Although the song was self-released, its publication states as Queenie Records, Diamandis's independent record label.) alongside an accompanying music video. Marina wrote and recorded the electropop and techno-pop song, and co-produced the record with American songwriter CJ Baran.

== Composition and lyrics ==
In an interview with Rolling Stone in April 2025, Marina discussed the release of her empowering new single "Cuntissimo", which dropped alongside the announcement of her sixth studio album, Princess of Power. Musically, the song is an anthemic techno-pop and electropop track inspired by glamorous, brave, and confident women "who enjoy life to the max". Marina elaborated that "Cuntissimo" draws inspiration from iconic women throughout history who embodied the qualities of strength, pleasure, and independence, listing figures such as Salma Hayek, Madonna, Elizabeth Taylor, Rihanna, and Sophia Loren as representations of the song's ethos.

Marina explained the song's central theme is pleasure, something she believes women have been denied for centuries due to patriarchal pressures. She said "Cuntissimo" serves as a defiant anthem, a bold statement of reclaiming power and rejecting the societal constraints placed upon women.

== Music video ==
An accompanying music video for "Cuntissimo" premiered on 11 April 2025, and was directed by Dominican-American filmmaker Olivia de Camps. The opening shot is filmed at Villa del Balbianello. Ahead of its release, Marina shared a teaser on 8 April generating anticipation for the video's release.

== Charts ==
Chart performance for "Cuntissimo"
Chart (2025)	Peak position
New Zealand Hot Singles (RMNZ)	24
UK Singles Downloads (Official Charts)	95

== Release history ==
Release dates and formats for "Cuntissimo"
Region	Date	Format(s)	Label	Ref.
Various	10 April 2025	Digital download; streaming	Queenie; BMG	
