= Eat the World =

2024 poetry collection by Marina Diamandis

- Book cover
- Author: Marina Diamandis
- Language: English
- Genre: Poetry
- Publisher: Penguin Random House, Canongate Books Ltd
- Publication date: 29 October 2024
- Publication place: United Kingdom
- Pages: 272
- ISBN: 9780143138594

Eat the World (also titled Eat the World: A Collection of Poems) is a collection of poetry by Marina Diamandis, published on October 29 2024. The poetry book was published in the UK through Penguin Random House and Canongate Books.

The poems focus on themes of trauma, youth and relationships, and contain recounts of events in Diamandis's life from her late teens through her mid-30s.

== Background ==
Following the release of her 2021 album Ancient Dreams in a Modern Land, Diamandis began work on her next album. The writing process for the poetry book began in 2021 during writing sessions for her sixth studio album, PRINCESS OF POWER. These early song lyrics were turned into poems after Diamandis realised they work better as poems. During the writing, Diamandis has stated that she was on mushroom trips, which inspired her to start writing in a "different way".

== Poems ==
- Introduction
- Starlight, Water, Space, Fresh Air
- Aspartame
- Pain Eraser
- Death by Panamera
- Proof of Time
- Fizz
- Smoothness of Money
- Butterflies
- School of Life
- Million Tiny Knives
- Out of Production
- Soft Warning
- Factory Settings
- Land of Limbs
- Beautiful/Evil
- Billionaire's Beach
- Sex Robot
- Moon Rock
- Night Surfing
- Four Seasons
- Merman
- The Sparkling Clam
- I don't want the same anymore
- Tiny Leopards
- Hotel Riche
- Denominator
- Pink Elephant
- 1,000 Black Nights
- E-Motion
- Inner Peace & Other Lies
- Heavy Metals
- Blockbuster
- Marie Kondo
- Broken Heart Syndrome
- Eclipse
- Behemoth
- Cocoon
- Eat the World
