= Ancient Dreams in a Modern Land Tour =

2022 concert tour by Marina

- Tour by Marina
- Location: Europe; North America; Latin America
- Associated album: Ancient Dreams in a Modern Land
- Start date: 2 February 2022
- End date: 25 May 2022
- Legs: 4
- No. of shows: 34
- Supporting acts: Tove Styrke; Pussy Riot; Maeve

Marina concert chronology
- Love + Fear Tour (2019); Ancient Dreams in a Modern Land Tour (2022); The Princess of Power Tour (2025)

The Ancient Dreams in a Modern Land Tour was a concert tour by Welsh singer-songwriter Marina. The tour supported her fifth studio album Ancient Dreams in a Modern Land (2021), and visited North America and Europe. The tour began on 2 February 2022 at SF Masonic Auditorium in San Francisco, California, and concluded on 18 November 2022 at the Autodromo Hermanos Rodriguez in Mexico City. The tour was promoted by Live Nation Entertainment.

== Set list ==
This setlist is representative of the show on 22 February 2022 in Philadelphia. It is not intended to represent all shows from the tour.

1. "Ancient Dreams in a Modern Land"
2. "Venus Fly Trap"
3. "Froot"
4. "Man's World"
5. "Are You Satisfied?"
6. "I Am Not a Robot"
7. "Oh No!"
8. "Purge the Poison"
9. "Handmade Heaven"
10. "Hollywood"
11. "Happy"
12. "Forget"
13. "Can't Pin Me Down"
14. "Teen Idle"
15. "Highly Emotional People"
16. "I Love You but I Love Me More"
17. "How to Be a Heartbreaker"
18. "Bubblegum Bitch"
  Encore
19. "Goodbye"

== Shows ==
List of concerts, showing date, city, country, venue and opening acts
Date	City	Country	Venue	Opening act(s)
2 February 2022	San Francisco	United States	SF Masonic Auditorium	Tove Styrke
5 February 2022	Portland	United States	Keller Auditorium	Tove Styrke
7 February 2022	Seattle	United States	Paramount Theatre	Tove Styrke
11 February 2022	Denver	United States	Paramount Theatre	Tove Styrke
14 February 2022	Minneapolis	United States	Orpheum Theatre	Tove Styrke
15 February 2022	Chicago	United States	Chicago Theatre	Tove Styrke
17 February 2022	Detroit	United States	The Fillmore Detroit	Tove Styrke
18 February 2022	Toronto	Canada	Rebel	Tove Styrke
19 February 2022	Pittsburgh	United States	Stage AE	Tove Styrke
21 February 2022	Boston	United States	Orpheum Theatre	Tove Styrke
22 February 2022	Philadelphia	United States	Metropolitan Opera House	Tove Styrke
24 February 2022	Washington, D.C.	United States	The Anthem	Tove Styrke
25 February 2022	New York City	United States	Terminal 5	Tove Styrke
26 February 2022	New York City	United States	Terminal 5	Pussy Riot
28 February 2022	Atlanta	United States	Coca-Cola Roxy	Pussy Riot
1 March 2022	Nashville	United States	Ryman Auditorium	Pussy Riot
3 March 2022	Houston	United States	Bayou Music Center	Pussy Riot
4 March 2022	Austin	United States	Moody Theater	Pussy Riot
5 March 2022	Dallas	United States	The Factory in Deep Ellum	Pussy Riot
9 March 2022	Inglewood	United States	YouTube Theater	Pussy Riot
18 March 2022 (Note: The 18 March 2022 show in Buenos Aires was part of Lollapalooza Argentina.)	Buenos Aires	Argentina	Hipódromo de San Isidro	—
19 March 2022 (Note: The 19 March 2022 show in Santiago was part of Lollapalooza Chile.)	Santiago	Chile	Parque Bicentenario	—
25 March 2022 (Note: The 25 March 2022 show in São Paulo was part of Lollapalooza Brazil.)	São Paulo	Brazil	Interlagos Circuit	—
26 March 2022 (Note: The 26 March 2022 show in Bogotá was part of Estéreo Picnic Festival.)	Bogotá	Colombia	Campo de Golf Briceño 18	—
9 May 2022	Copenhagen	Denmark	Vega	Tove Stryke
12 May 2022	The Hague	Netherlands	Amare	Tove Stryke
14 May 2022	Brussels	Belgium	La Madeleine	Tove Stryke
15 May 2022	Paris	France	Bataclan	Tove Stryke
17 May 2022	Edinburgh	Scotland	O_{2} Academy Edinburgh	Tove Styrke; Maeve
20 May 2022	Manchester	England	O_{2} Apollo Manchester	Tove Styrke; Maeve
21 May 2022	Leeds	England	The Refectory	Tove Styrke; Maeve
22 May 2022	London	England	O_{2} Academy Brixton	Tove Styrke; Maeve
25 May 2022	Dublin	Ireland	3Olympia Theatre	Tove Styrke; Maeve
3 June 2022	West Hollywood	United States	West Hollywood Park	—
11 June 2022	Miami	United States	RC Cola Plant	—
18 November 2022 (Note: The 18 November 2022 show in Mexico City was part of Corona Capital.)	Mexico City	Mexico	Autodromo Hermanos Rodriguez	—
