= Marina Diamandis =

Welsh singer-songwriter (born 1985)

Marina
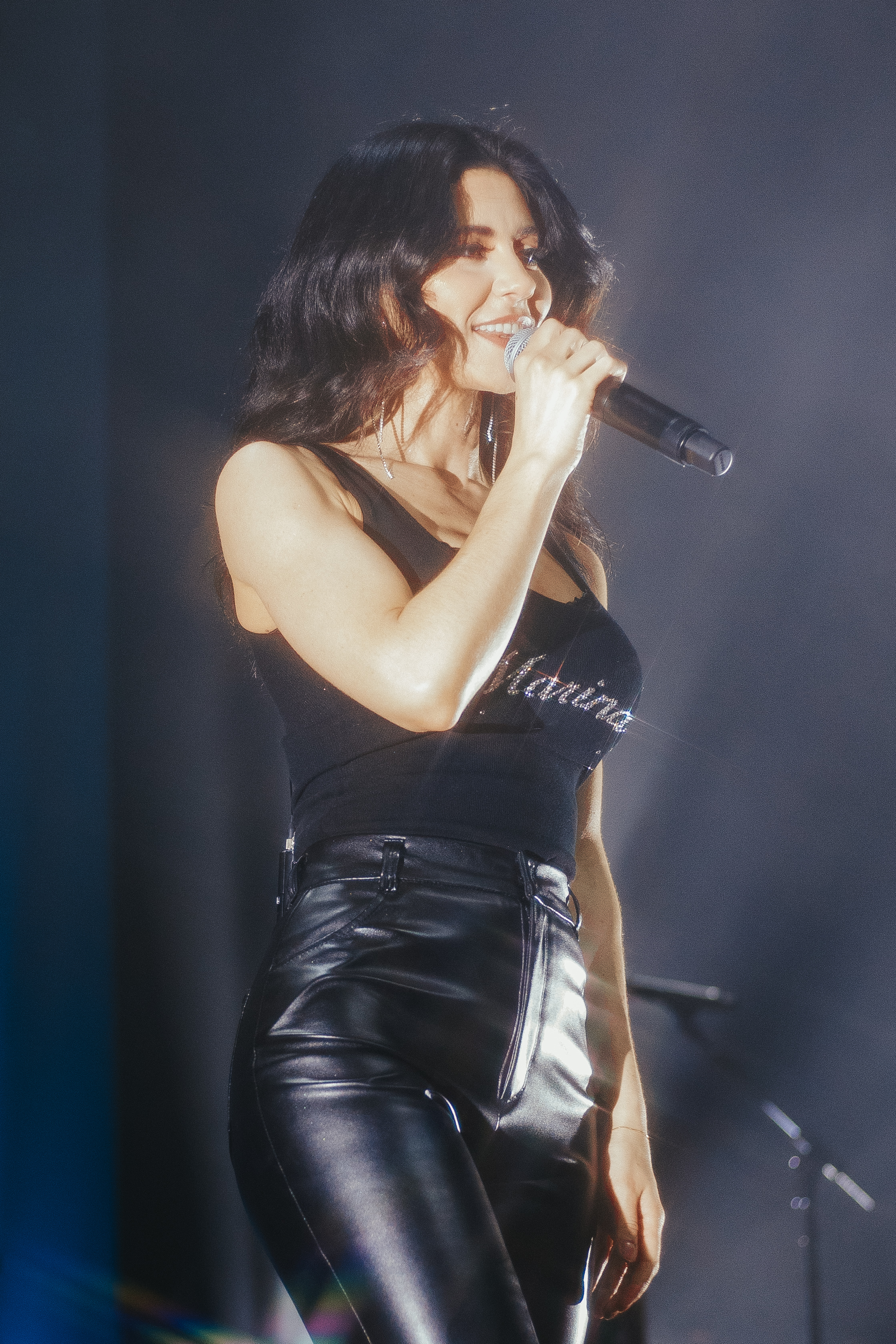
- Diamandis in 2022
- Born: Marina Lambrini Diamandis; 10 October 1985 (age 41); Brynmawr, Wales
- Other names: Marina and the Diamonds
- Occupations: Singer; songwriter; record producer; poet
- Years active: 2005–present
- Works: Discography; songs recorded
- Musical career
- Origin: London, England
- Genres: Pop; alternative; electronic; indie
- Instruments: Vocals; piano; keyboards; synthesizer
- Labels: Neon Gold; 679; Atlantic; Chop Shop; Elektra; BMG; Queenie
- Website: www.marinaofficial.co.uk

Marina Lambrini Diamandis (Note: /ˌdiːəˈmændɪs/ DEE-ə-MAN-diss; Greek: Μαρίνα-Λαμπρινή Διαμάντη, romanised: Marína-Lampriní Diamánti) (born 10 October 1985), professionally known under the mononym Marina (Note: often stylised in all caps) and previously by the stage name Marina and the Diamonds, is a Welsh singer, songwriter, poet and record producer of Greek ancestry.

Born in Brynmawr and raised near Abergavenny, Diamandis later moved to London to become a professional singer, despite having little formal musical experience. In 2009, she came to prominence upon placing second in the BBC's Sound of 2010. Her debut studio album, The Family Jewels (2010), incorporated indie pop and new wave musical styles. It entered the UK Albums Chart at number five and was certified gold by the British Phonographic Industry. The album's second single, "Hollywood", peaked at number 12 on the UK singles chart. Diamandis's second studio album, Electra Heart (2012), was a concept album about a character of the same name. The album explored electropop and dance-pop and became her first number one album in the United Kingdom. It was certified gold in the US and UK, and respectively produced the successful singles "Primadonna" and "How to Be a Heartbreaker".

Diamandis' Europop-inspired third studio album, Froot (2015), became her third top 10 album in the UK and her first top 10 entry on the US Billboard 200. In 2018, she was featured on Clean Bandit's single "Baby", which made the top 20 in the UK. Her fourth studio album, Love + Fear (2019), charted at number five on the UK album chart. In 2021, Diamandis released her fifth studio album, Ancient Dreams in a Modern Land, which debuted at number 17 in the UK, and was followed by a deluxe version in 2022. Diamandis's sixth studio album, Princess of Power, was released on 6 June 2025; it was preceded by the singles "Butterfly", "Cupid's Girl" and "Cuntissimo".

== Early life ==
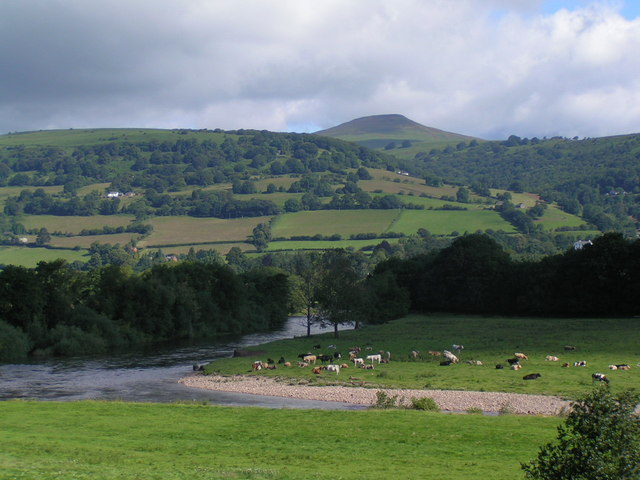
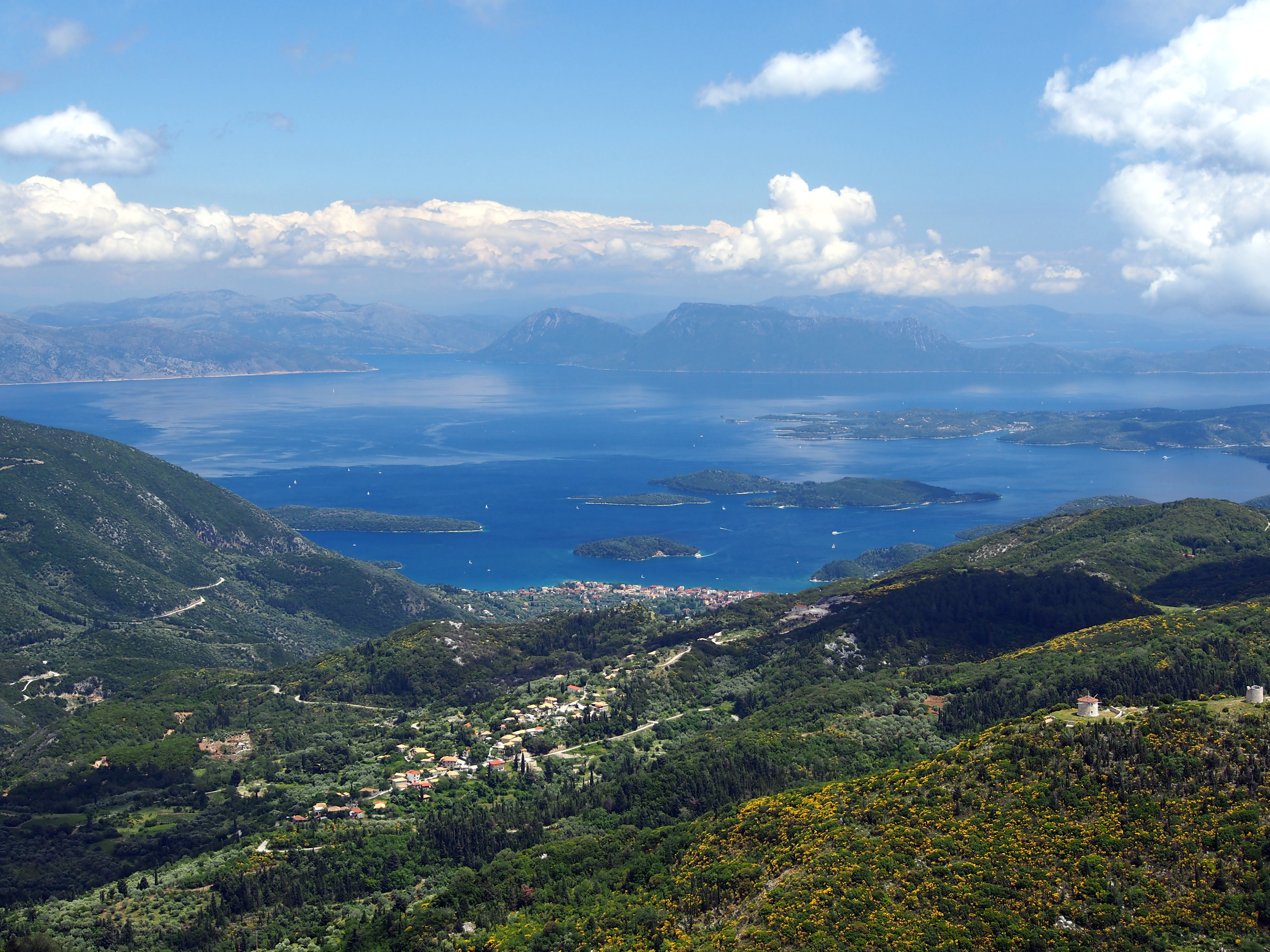
Describing herself as "half Greek and half Welsh", Diamandis split her childhood between southeast Wales (pictured left) and the Greek island of Lefkada (right).

Marina Lambrini Diamandis was born on 10 October 1985 in Brynmawr, and grew up in Pandy, near Abergavenny. She has one sibling, an elder sister named Lafina. Her Welsh mother and Greek father met at Newcastle University and separated when Diamandis was four years old. Following the separation, her father returned to Greece but would occasionally visit, while she remained in a bungalow in Wales with her mother. She described her childhood as "simple and idyllic" and "peaceful, very normal, poor". Diamandis said that she was a "tomboy" as a child, playing football every day and spending more time with the opposite sex.

As a child, Diamandis attended Haberdashers' Monmouth School for Girls. She said, "I sort of found my talent there... I was the one who always skived off choir, but I had an incredible music teacher who managed to convince me I could do anything." At the age of 16, she moved to Greece to be with her father and "to connect with [her] heritage and learn to speak the language," and sang Greek folk songs with her grandmother.

Having earned an International Baccalaureate at St. Catherine's British Embassy School in Athens, she returned to Wales two years later. She and her mother then moved to England, settling in Ross-on-Wye. Obsessed with becoming a singer "almost as if it was a disease", she worked at a petrol station for two months in order to earn money to move to London.

Despite not having a musical background, Diamandis had a childhood love of writing. She first began writing music when she was 18 years old; she moved to London to attend dance school, but quit after two months. She studied music at the University of East London and transferred to a classic composition course in Middlesex University the following year, but dropped out after two months.

== Career ==
=== 2005–2011: Career beginnings and The Family Jewels ===
"I created the name 'Marina and the Diamonds' 5 years ago, and I never envisaged a character, pop project, band or solo artist. I saw a simple group made up of many people who had the same hearts. A space for people with similar ideals who could not fit in to life's pre-made mold. I was terribly awkward for a long time! I really craved to be part of one thing because I never felt too connected to anybody and now I feel I have that all around me."

— Diamandis, 2010

Knowing the Spice Girls were formed by an advertisement in The Stage, Diamandis applied for auditions listed in that newspaper. She travelled for several unsuccessful auditions, including opportunities with the musical The Lion King and a boy band organised by Virgin Records. It was during this time that she managed to leave her CV with an A&R representative, but was unable to audition at the time of the appointment as she felt sick. In 2005, she created the stage name Marina and the Diamonds. After she came to prominence, the 'and the Diamonds' part was established as a reference to her fans instead of her backing band.

Inspired by the example of self-produced outsider musician Daniel Johnston, Diamandis decided to compose her own music and stop going to auditions. She taught herself how to play the piano. She self-composed and produced her earlier demos with GarageBand, and independently released her debut extended play, Mermaid vs Sailor, through Myspace in 2007. She met with fourteen music labels, only being offered one deal, which she also believed was the only one which would not dictate her image.

She came to the attention of Neon Gold Records' Derek Davies in 2008, which managed her for six months, and was hired as the supporting act for Australian recording artist Gotye. Davies reflected, "She just had something that really resonated with me. Even with the quite limited production of her early bedroom demos, she had this powerful yet vulnerable vocal and writing style that didn't sound like anyone else at the time". In October, Diamandis finalised a recording contract with 679 Recordings (eventually renamed 679 Artists), a subdivision of Warner Music Group.

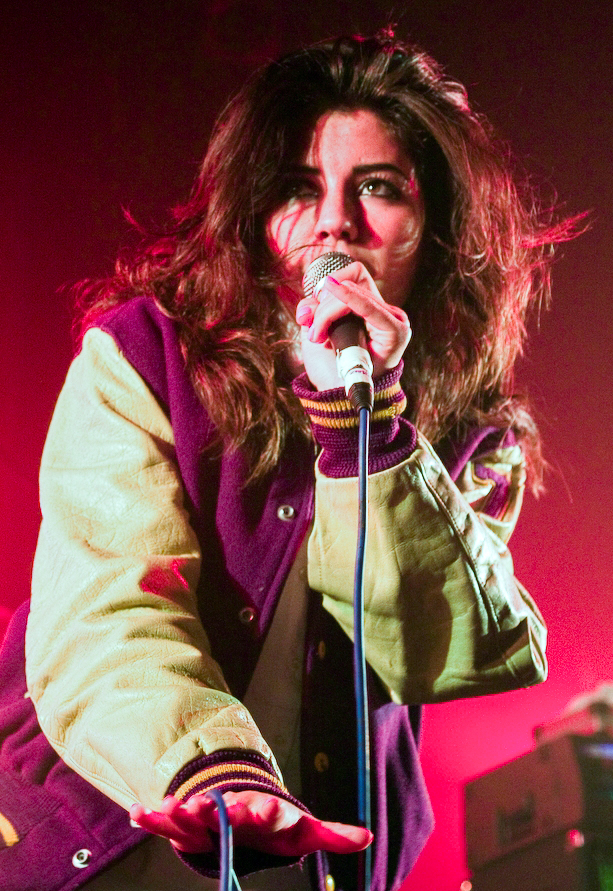
Diamandis performing at Northumbria University, October 2009

Diamandis's debut single, "Obsessions", was released on 14 February 2009 through Neon Gold Records, while her first extended play, The Crown Jewels EP, followed on 1 June. That summer, she performed at BBC Radio 1's Big Weekend, the Glastonbury Festival, and the Reading and Leeds Festivals. She also performed at iTunes Live, releasing a second EP in July 2009 of performances from that festival.

In December 2009, Diamandis was ranked in second place on the Sound of 2010 poll organised by the BBC, behind Ellie Goulding. She was one of three nominees for the Critics' Choice Award at the 2010 BRIT Awards, which also went to Goulding. "Mowgli's Road" was released on 13 November 2009, with Diamandis describing it as "uncommercial". Despite this, it received attention after its video was shared by the likes of Perez Hilton and Kanye West.

"Mowgli's Road" was followed by "Hollywood" on 1 February 2010, which reached number 12 on the UK Singles Chart, and was eventually certified silver by the British Phonographic Industry (BPI). Diamandis's debut studio album, The Family Jewels, was released on 15 February 2010. It debuted at number five on the UK Albums Chart with first-week sales of 27,618 copies, and was eventually certified gold by the BPI. A 2012 press release from Atlantic Records noted that the album had sold 300,000 copies.

Atlantic Records signed Diamandis to Chop Shop Records in the United States in March 2010. Through the label, she released her third extended play, The American Jewels EP, and The Family Jewels in the United States. The latter project debuted at number 138 on the US Billboard 200 with first-week sales of 4,000 copies, and on Billboard's Top Heatseekers and Top Rock Albums charts, where it peaked at number 2 and 49 respectively.

Later in 2010, Diamandis released three more singles from the album; "I Am Not a Robot", "Oh No!" and "Shampain", which peaked at 26, 38 and 141 in the UK charts. In October 2010, she won Best UK & Ireland Act at the MTV Europe Music Awards. To further promote The Family Jewels, Diamandis embarked on The Family Jewels Tour, which visited Europe, North America and Australia throughout 2010 and 2011. In January 2011, in an Australian radio interview, she expressed disappointment at her career, particularly in her failure to attract an American audience. She put this down to inaction by her label and American listeners' contemporary taste for "pumping beats" by artists such as Lady Gaga.

=== 2012–2016: Electra Heart and Froot ===
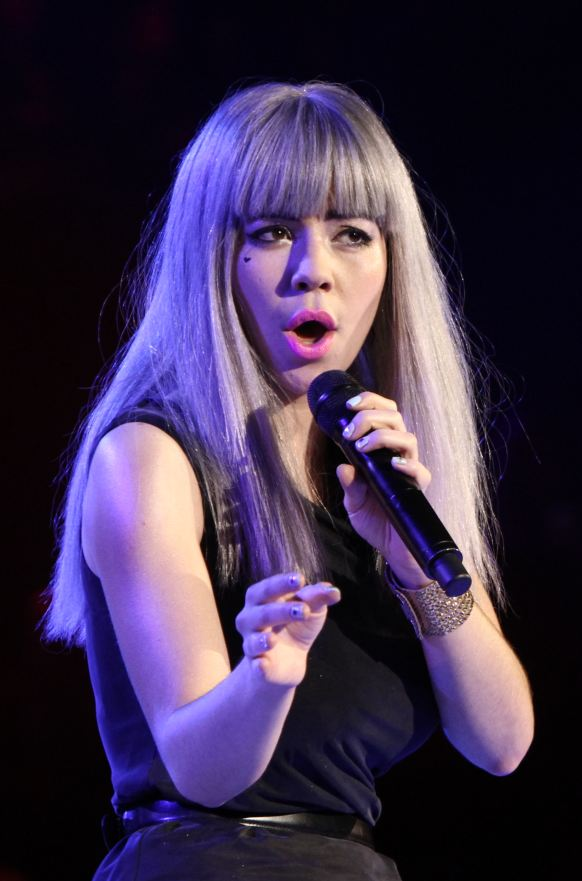
Diamandis performing in January 2012

In the summer of 2011, Diamandis and Swedish recording artist Robyn performed as the opening acts for American recording artist Katy Perry's California Dreams Tour. On 30 September, Diamandis released the track "Radioactive" through the iTunes Store. It peaked at number 25 on the UK Singles Chart. Her second studio album was preceded by its lead single, "Primadonna", in April 2012. The song is notable for being Diamandis's highest-charting track on the UK Singles Chart, where it reached number 11. It is certified Silver by the BPI, gold in Austria and the United States, and platinum by the respective authorities in Australia, Denmark and New Zealand.

The final product, Electra Heart, is a concept album lyrically united by the ideas of "female identity" and "a recent breakup". Diamandis created the titular character "Electra Heart" as a protagonist for the project. She portrays the personas "Housewife", "Beauty Queen", "Homewrecker", and "Idle Teen", which represent several female archetypes of stereotypical American culture. The project was released on 27 April 2012, and debuted at number one on the UK Albums Chart with first-week sales of 21,358 copies.

It became Diamandis's first chart-topping album in the United Kingdom, although at the time it was distinguished as the lowest-selling number-one record of the 21st century in the country. The album was certified gold by the British Phonographic Industry and the Irish Recorded Music Association. Electra Heart debuted at 31 on the US Billboard 200 with 12,000 copies sold its first week, and as of May 2015 has sold 150,000 copies in that country.

"Power & Control" and "How to Be a Heartbreaker" were subsequent single releases, with the latter missing the cut-off for initial inclusion on the record. However, it was featured in the revised track listing for the American version. The two songs were minor chart entries in the UK, and the latter was certified gold in the United States for sales over 500,000 copies. Throughout 2012, Diamandis travelled for The Lonely Hearts Club Tour, which was her second headlining concert tour, and the Mylo Xyloto Tour headlined by Coldplay, for which she served as an opening act. On 8 August 2013, she released a music video for the previously unreleased title track "Electra Heart". It depicted the death of the character, and symbolically ended the promotional campaign for Electra Heart.

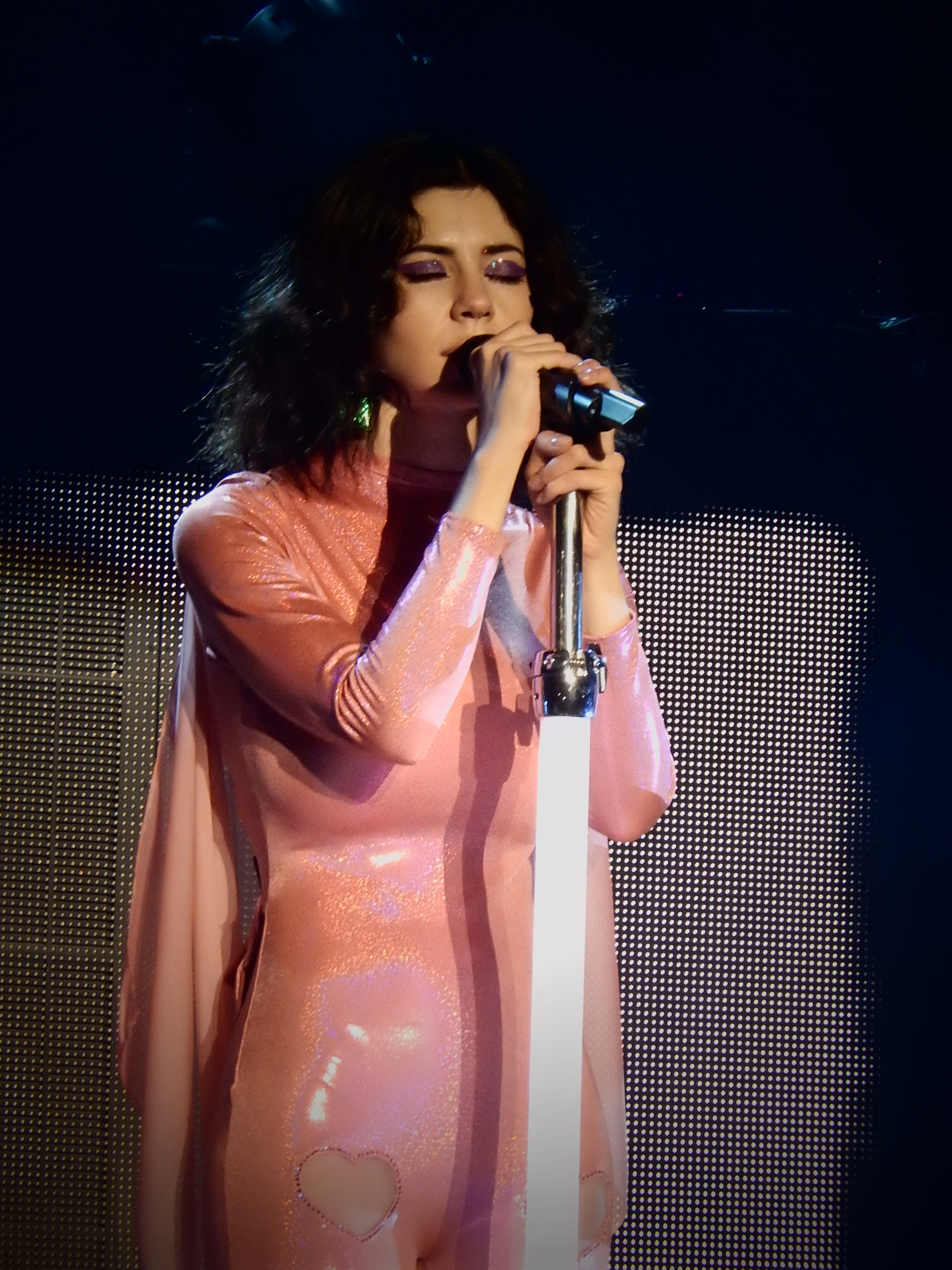
Diamandis performing at the Roundhouse, London, in February 2016

After spending one month in New York City, Diamandis announced in February 2013 that she had begun writing material for an upcoming third studio album. The single "Froot" was released on 10 October 2014, her 29th birthday, and announced as the title track.

The album was announced to be released on 3 April 2015, with a new track from the album being announced each month. However, due to an Internet leak, the release was brought forward. Entirely produced by Diamandis and David Kosten, the album was praised for its cohesive sound. Froot debuted at number 8 on the Billboard 200 chart, and is her highest-charting album in the United States. Froot peaked at 10 in the UK.

In early 2015, it was announced that Diamandis would perform at Lollapalooza Brazil, Coachella Valley Music and Arts Festival and the Boston Calling Music Festival that March, April and May respectively. From October 2015 to the following October, she embarked on the Neon Nature Tour across Europe and the Americas. Each performance was split into three acts; one for each of her albums, with most of the songs coming from Froot. Her performance at the House of Blues in Boston in November of that year was broadcast live by Yahoo.

During a question-and-answer video, Diamandis said that subsequent tours would be different, as her usual tours had been "a hard lifestyle". In April 2016, she said she would take a break from music after her tour. She returned to performing two months later, clarifying that she would rather work on a consistent basis than a cycle of touring and resting.

=== 2017–2022: Love + Fear and Ancient Dreams in a Modern Land ===
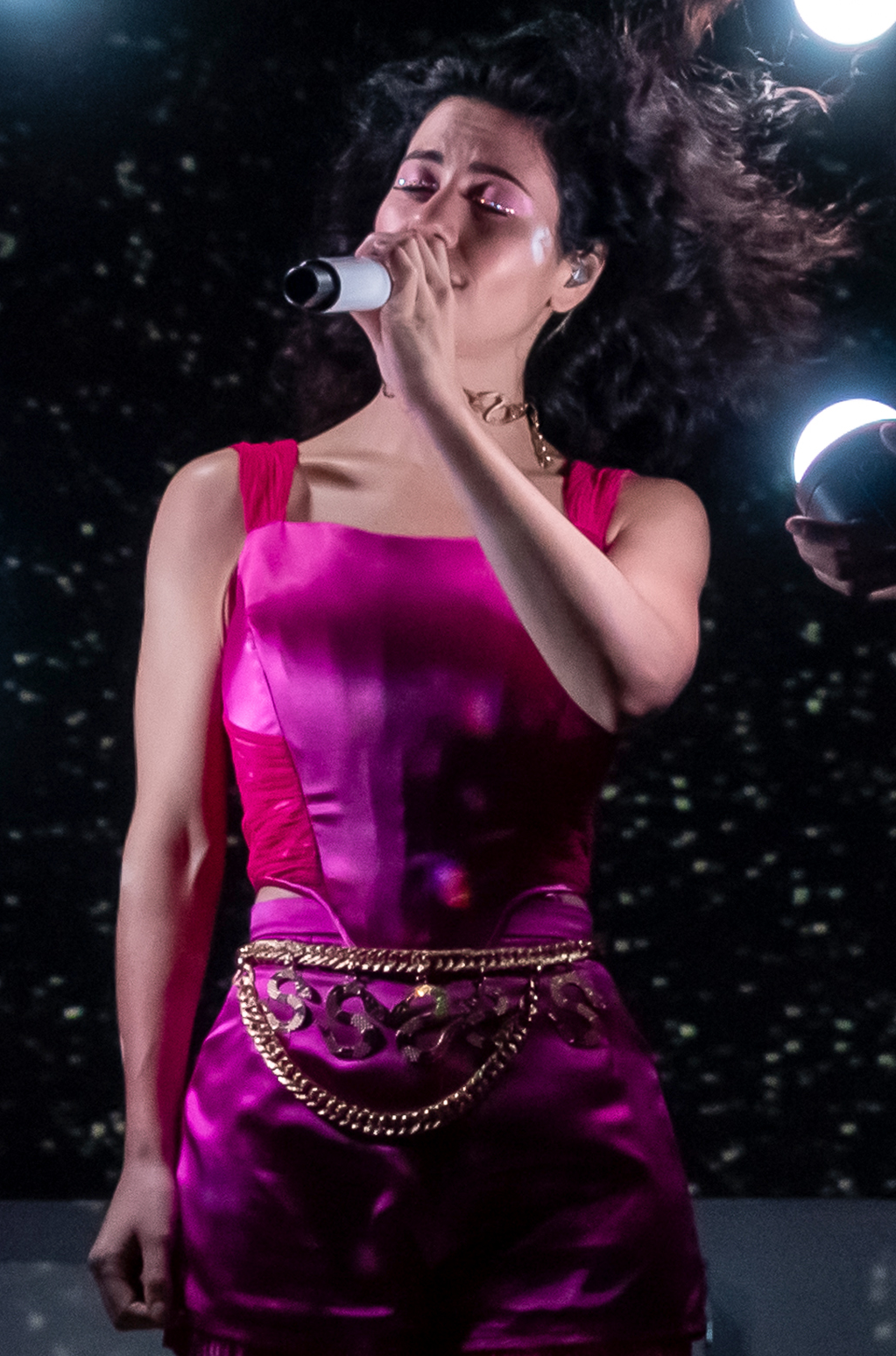
Diamandis performing at the Greek Theatre, Los Angeles, in October 2019

In June 2016, Diamandis told Fuse that she had begun writing new material for upcoming songs. In December 2016, electronic group Clean Bandit confirmed that "Disconnect", a song they had performed with Diamandis at the 2015 Coachella Valley Music and Arts Festival, would be released on their new album. It was released as a single in June 2017, and she performed it with them at Glastonbury. To mark a new stage in her career, Diamandis announced via Twitter in 2018 that she would be dropping her "and the Diamonds" moniker to release music as simply "Marina". She explained that "It took me well over a year to figure out that a lot of my identity was tied up in who I was as an artist and there wasn't much left of who I was".

In November 2018, a second collaboration with Clean Bandit and Puerto Rican singer Luis Fonsi, "Baby", was released. It peaked at number 15 in the UK. On 11 December of the same year, Diamandis performed at the Royal Variety Performance alongside Clean Bandit with their song "Baby". On 31 January 2019, Diamandis teased the new album by posting a picture on her Instagram with the caption "8 Days". The day after, she revealed in an interview that the new album would come out sometime in early 2019. On 6 February 2019, it was revealed that the title of the lead single of the album would be "Handmade Heaven", which was released two days later. Her bipartite fourth studio album, Love + Fear, was then released in two halves on 4 and 26 April 2019.

On 29 April 2019, Diamandis embarked on her Love + Fear Tour with six UK gigs, including sold-out dates in London and Manchester. In July 2019, she was scheduled to play a number of music festivals across Europe and the UK, before taking the tour to North America with 19 dates across the US and Canada in September and October. This would then be followed by a second run of UK dates and a short European tour. She was featured on Gryffin's song (also featuring Model Child) "If I Left the World", released on 23 October 2019.

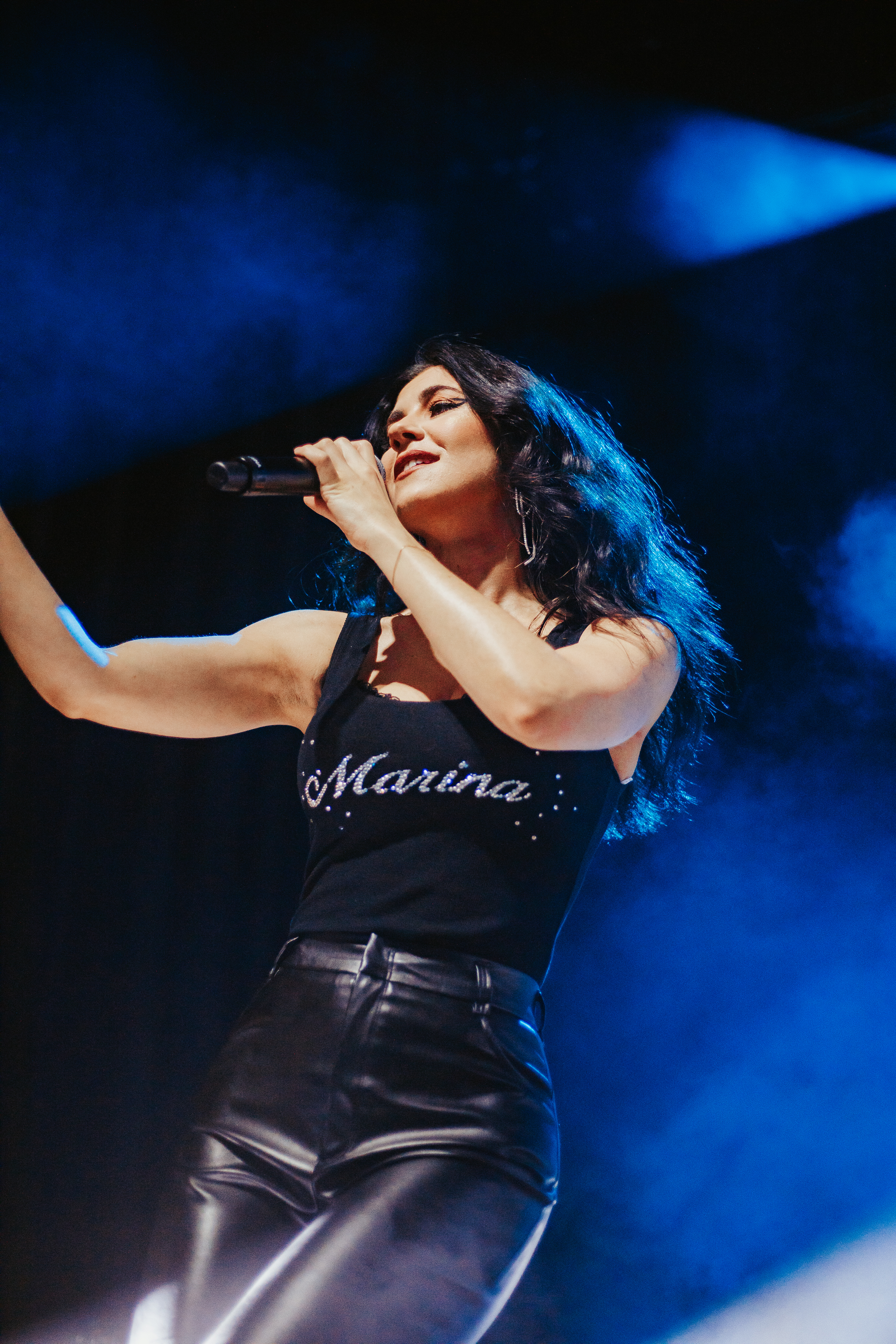
Diamandis performing at Ryman Auditorium, Nashville, in March 2022

On 16 January 2020, Diamandis posted two photos on Instagram with the caption "Writing songs in Paris". On 24 January 2020, she posted a photo on Instagram with the caption "Album 5". On 7 February 2020, Diamandis released "About Love" from the soundtrack for the movie To All the Boys: P.S. I Still Love You. On 14 February 2020, she announced her upcoming April tour, The Inbetweenie Tour. On 16 March 2020, she announced that this tour would be cancelled due to the COVID-19 pandemic.

On 8 March 2020, she posted a snippet of a new song named "Man's World" on her Instagram story. The song was released on 18 November 2020. The single debuted at number 99 on the Official UK Singles Sales Chart and at number 96 on the Official UK Singles Download Chart after two days release. On 12 April 2021, Diamandis announced a new single, "Purge the Poison", alongside a website and a mailing list to accompany it. Later that day, her web team accidentally uploaded the music video onto YouTube, resulting in an early leak of the song and music video. Diamandis released the single cover and release date soon after, possibly as a result of the early leak. Ancient Dreams in a Modern Land was released on 11 June 2021. The album was well received by critics. The album's fifth single, "Happy Loner", was released on 3 December 2021 to coincide with the deluxe version of the album, which released on 7 January 2022.

On 1 October 2021, Diamandis announced on Instagram that she started working on her sixth studio album. On 27 April 2022, Diamandis announced that Electra Heart would be getting an expanded version, which was called Electra Heart: Platinum Blonde Edition. The album was released digitally two days later, with the vinyl release following on 23 September 2022. On 22 May 2022, Diamandis announced while performing in London that Ancient Dreams in a Modern Land would be her last album with Atlantic Records. She had been signed to the record label for the past 14 years.

=== 2023–present: Eat the World and Princess of Power ===
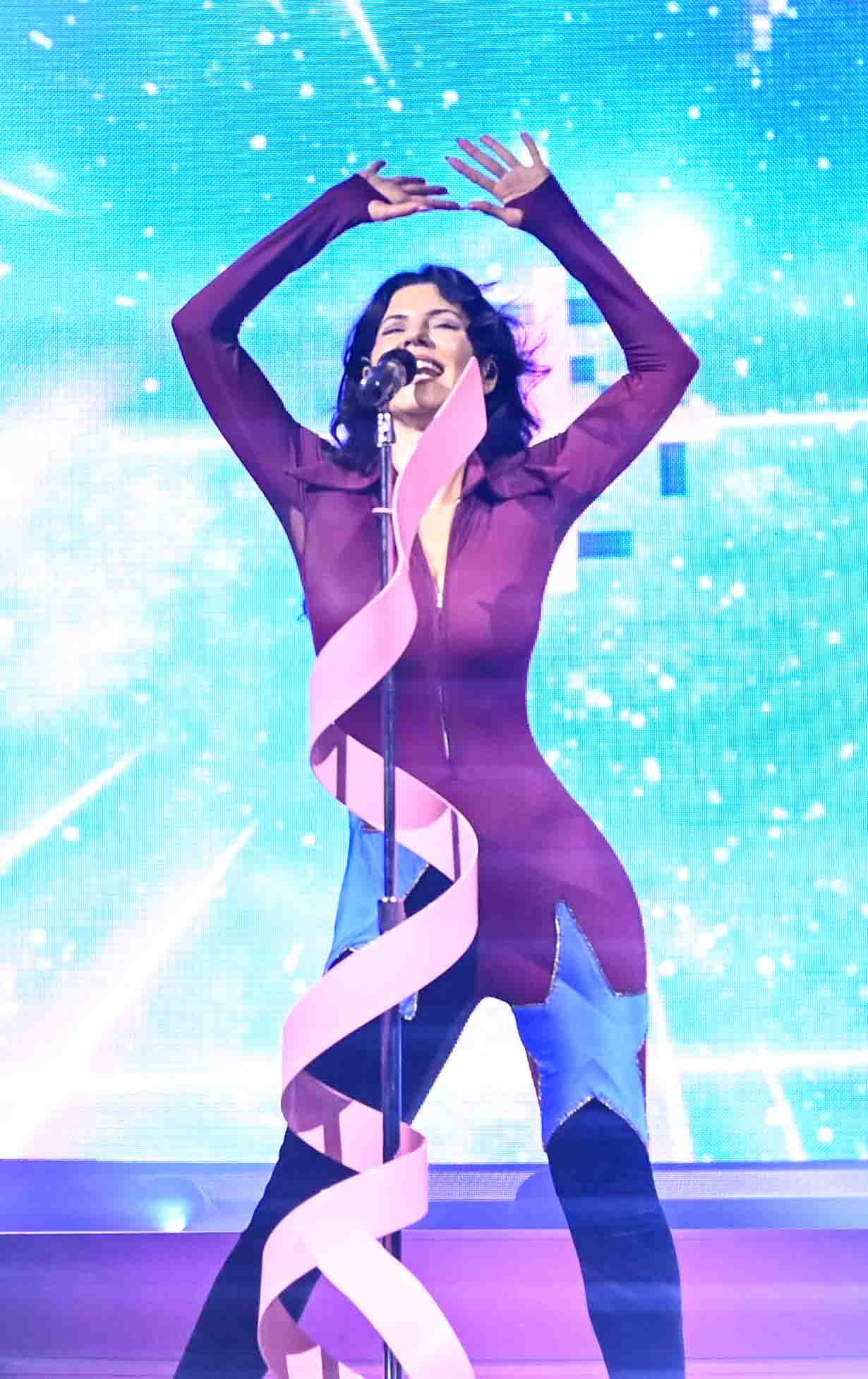
Diamandis performing in Philadelphia on The Princess of Power Tour in 2025

On 31 January 2023, Diamandis began to tease new work via social media. Throughout the year, she published multiple poems on her accounts. On 2 April 2024, through an interview with Rolling Stone, Diamandis announced her upcoming poetry book, Eat the World, set to be released on 29 October 2024. In the interview, she spoke of the book's inspiration, revealing that the poems had started out as lyrics; however, after an experience with "magic mushrooms", she realised that they were poems, and she began to write poetry "every single day" throughout 2022. In the same interview, she announced that she was working on her upcoming album as well, stating she had "been writing for six months", but that she was still not far along in the process. In an interview with Attitude in July 2024, Diamandis confirmed that the album would be released in 2025.

On 3 June 2024, it was announced that Diamandis, along with Anitta and Altégo, would support Kylie Minogue at her BST Hyde Park performance on 19 July 2024. On 21 February 2025, Diamandis released "Butterfly", the lead single from her sixth studio album, Princess of Power. A music video was released the same day, premiering on YouTube and the Paramount Times Square billboards in New York City. On 20 March, another single, titled "Cupid's Girl", was released. The album's third single, "Cuntissimo", was released on 10 April 2025, in addition to the announcement of the parent album's title, cover and release date.

On 11 April 2025, Diamandis performed on the main stage at Coachella; as well as performing older material including "Bubblegum Bitch", "How to Be a Heartbreaker", "I Am Not a Robot", and "Primadonna", she performed all three of her newest singles, "Butterfly", "Cupid's Girl", and "Cuntissimo". Princess of Power was released on 6 June 2025, and charted at number 7 on the UK Albums Chart, becoming her fifth studio album to chart in the UK Top 10.

On 2 August 2025, Diamandis performed on the third day of the Lollapalooza festival located in Chicago, IL. She performed songs from older albums like "Froot" and "Are You Satisfied?" Diamandis performed numerous other songs from her new album The Princess of Power including "Everybody Knows I'm Sad", making its live debut. She kicked off The Princess of Power Tour on 6 September 2025 in Seattle, Washington. On 24 October 2025, Diamandis released the deluxe version of her sixth album.

== Artistry ==
"[Daniel Johnston] really opened me up to a whole new world of music and a whole new perception of what an artist is. For me, he really encouraged me because if you think of someone who has been spoon-fed pop, up until 21 years old, and you hear someone like Daniel Johnston you're like 'God, this is terrible, but I love it.' It sounds like a child has made it, like, the production is so all over the place. He's obviously got something very captivating here yet he doesn't fit the normal mold and people still love him. I thought 'if he can do it then I can,' that's when I started to produce things myself and play live, even though I wasn't even great on the piano. It's all about emotion and if you have heart, and people connect to that, they see right through us."

— Diamandis

Diamandis has a musical style consisting of indie pop, art pop, electropop, synth-pop, experimental pop, bubblegum pop,, disco-pop and left-field pop. She is known for her mezzo-soprano vocal abilities. As a child, she would take inspiration from the differing musical tastes of her parents – Dolly Parton, Enya and George Michael from her mother, and Haris Alexiou from her father – while also admiring pop acts of the era including the Spice Girls, Britney Spears and S Club 7.

Diamandis has said that "Madonna was the reason I wanted to be a pop star from the age of 15"; however she also stated that she did not listen to music "properly" until the age of 19, when she took influence from acts including PJ Harvey, Fiona Apple and the Distillers. She began smoking two years later in an attempt to sound like the Distillers' frontwoman Brody Dalle, "but it never worked, and now I'm just stuck with a bad habit."

She has cited Dalle and Spears as her musical influences, and has expressed a particular interest in Daniel Johnston and the lo-fi production he uses. She has jokingly stated that "I probably have a bit of a different sound because I don't really know what I'm doing!", referencing her lack of formal musical training. She also cited Katy Perry as an influence, saying she learned from Perry after going on tour with her. Diamandis has synesthesia, and as a result associates particular colours with musical notes and days of the week.

A self-described "DIY musician" and "indie artist with pop goals", Diamandis considers her music to be "alternate pop". Paul Lester wrote in 2008 that Diamandis's musical direction was "hard to fathom", given the frequency with which she alternated "simple keyboards-based ballads" and "quirky new wave-inflected numbers". Whereas The Family Jewels incorporated prominent elements of new wave music, Electra Heart was heavily inspired by electropop musical styles. Diamandis opined that the United States was more welcoming of said musical transition than the United Kingdom, and suggested that the American audience embraced the humour behind the latter "tongue-in-cheek record". Froot is a pop record, with elements of europop and pop rock.

Artists listing Marina Diamandis as an influence include Bridgit Mendler, Camila Cabello, Billie Eilish, Kim Petras and Slayyyter.

"Power & Control"
A sample of "Power & Control", a Greg Kurstin–produced electropop song from Electra Heart

At the start of her career, Diamandis was compared to other British female singer-songwriters, with Paul Lester from The Guardian writing that she had a "zeitgeist-y female essence". She took exception to such comparisons, and said that all she shared with Kate Nash was "a vagina and a keyboard". During the Electra Heart era, she called comparisons to Perry, Lady Gaga, and Lana Del Rey "really annoying", preferring to be classed as herself.

Her vocals have been compared to those of Karen O, Regina Spektor, Kate Bush, Florence Welch, Britney Spears, and Siouxsie Sioux, with an androgynous timbre akin to those of Annie Lennox and Heather Small. When reviewing The Family Jewels, Joe Copplestone from PopMatters noted that Diamandis's vocal delivery occasionally overpowers the "inventive" melodies showcased in her songs.

Diamandis's lyrical content typically analyses components of human behaviour. She has noted that she would have become a psychologist had she been unsuccessful in the music industry. The song "Savages", from the album Froot, reflects on humanity's proneness to violent acts. Rory Cashin of Slate lauded Diamandis's lyrics as "esoteric", likening her to an "emotionally intelligent outsider who knew how to perfectly articulate those weird thoughts and reactions we all have but would never admit to". Laurence Day of The Line of Best Fit considered Froot to be "an anthology of astute nihilistic, existentialist discussions".

== Public image and personal life ==
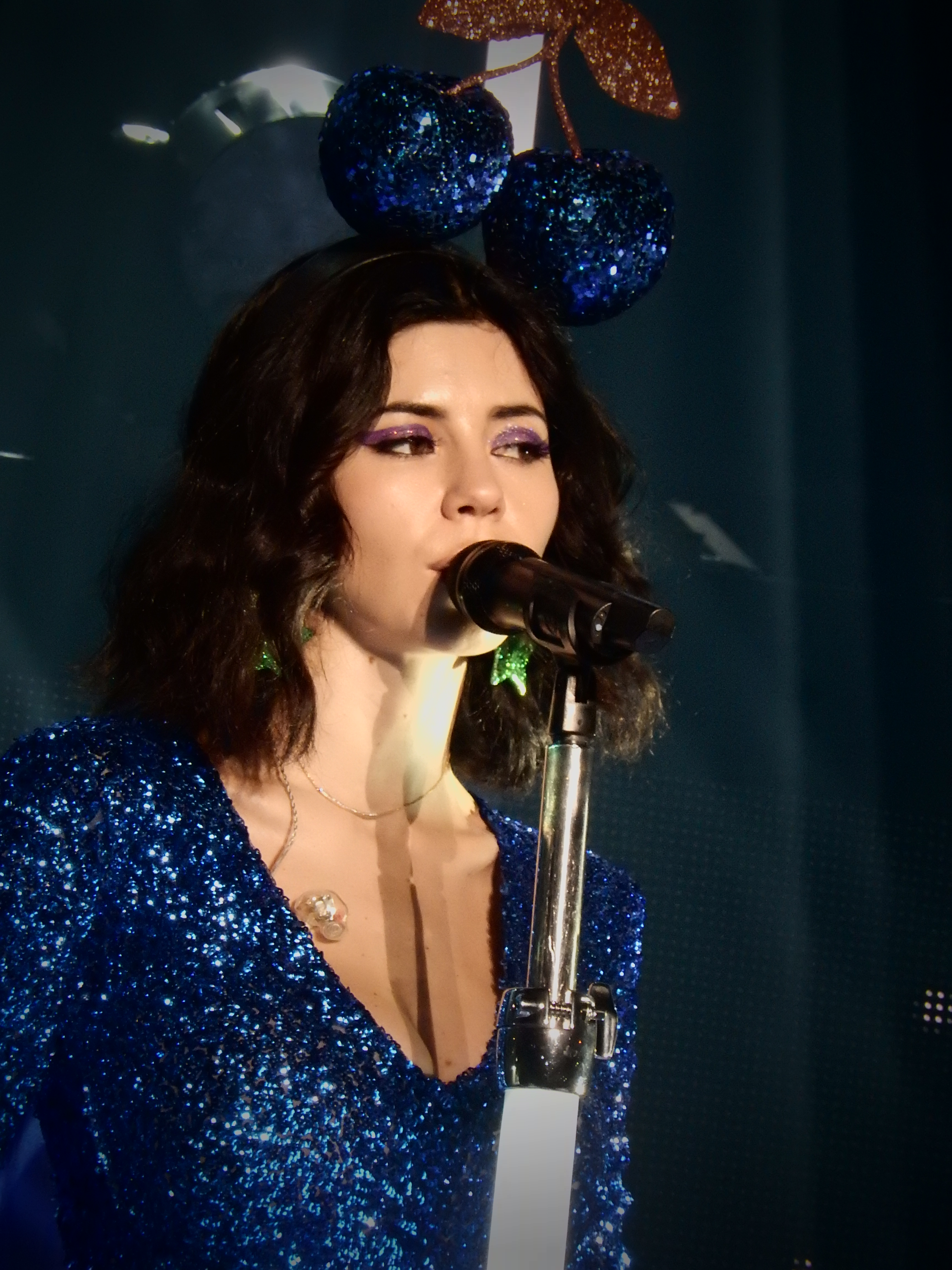
Diamandis described her fashion styles as "surreal and '70s".

Diamandis has identified Sophia Loren, Leigh Lezark, Shirley Manson and Gwen Stefani as her fashion icons, with Asli Polat and Mary Benson being among her favourite designers. As part of Selfridges' "Sound of Music", Diamandis and Paloma Faith designed their own window display for the London Oxford Street branch in May 2010, and additionally appeared as "live mannequins" for the display. In November, Diamandis was featured on the website for the British edition of Vogue, where she contributed to the "Today I'm Wearing" column that month. In February 2011, she became a brand ambassador for Max Factor. In 2013, she launched a fashion brand named 11 Diamonds and designed a line of T-shirts for it, but has had little involvement with it since.

According to Emily Jupp of The Independent, despite various changes in musical direction, an "unconventional fashion sense" has been a constant in Diamandis's career. In the music video for the song "How to be a Heartbreaker", she "subverts the norm" by wearing more clothes than male models in the background. She reflected that "I don't think it suits me to wear very little clothing, it just wouldn't feel right. I'd rather people listen to what I have to say instead of staring at my bum". In 2011, while promoting The Family Jewels, Diamandis described her fashion styles as "vintage, cheerleader, and cartoon". Four years later, she described her costumes then as "very badly put together vintage, kind of glittery ensemble", and her outfits for Froot as a "mix of '70s with digital fiberware ... something surreal and '70s".

She has been described as a "pop enigma", an artist who "never felt like she belonged to the masses" and one with a cult following. It was written in Billboard in June 2016 that she is among "pop artists with major fanbases in the U.S. and a consistent stream of excellent music who are nonetheless kept a tier below these other musicians in terms of national presence, because they never had that one hit that everyone simply has to know them from". She told Vice News in February 2016 that "I'm not really a [pop] starry person. Stars are people who equal celebrity culture. I don't really feel part of that at all".

Diamandis estimates that gay people comprise 60% of her concert audience. She attributes her status as a gay icon to her campness and sense of humour, in addition to lyrics on being a societal outsider. In 2012, she won the Best Music Award at gay magazine Attitude's award show. She headlined an NYC Pride event in June 2016 in the aftermath of the Orlando nightclub shooting, wearing a rainbow-striped cape. Diamandis plays down her popularity in the gay community in order to avoid sounding like a "cliché pop star", and hopes for a time when acceptance will mean that people do not label themselves by their sexuality.

Despite being familiar with Greek Orthodoxy, Diamandis states that she was not raised Christian and identifies as an atheist. She considers herself an introvert and revealed on Twitter that she is an INFJ in the Myers–Briggs Type Indicator. One of her songs that is especially focused on her introverted side and appreciating solitude is "Solitaire".

Diamandis dated Jack Patterson of electronic music group Clean Bandit for five years before splitting in 2020. Diamandis is currently in a relationship with actor and model Finn Harry.

=== Social and political views ===
Diamandis has frequently been an advocate of feminism and equal gender rights, sharing her social views in music, interviews and on social media. She was named "the sound of feminism" in Nylon magazine. The singer has been critical of traditional gender roles and societal prejudice towards women in general, as well as in the pop landscape and music industry. Her second album, Electra Heart, explored the feminine psyche and the ways women are embodied in American cultural stereotypes, with the track "Sex Yeah" often described as a "feminist statement". A few years later, Diamandis decided to work with an all-female team on her fifth studio album, Ancient Dreams in a Modern Land, in order to produce a broader feminist narrative. She explained that "this story can only be told by women".

In 2020, Diamandis started speaking openly about growing out her grey hair on Instagram to challenge unhealthy beauty standards. "I started getting silver / grey hairs around 15 years old. I've been dyeing my hair since I was 22 because I literally thought I had no other option. Grey equalled old to me – something most women are told is a bad, bad thing. Anything that symbolised this simply HAD to be covered!".

=== Mental and physical health ===
Diamandis has openly spoken about dealing with depression and anxiety. Her song "Happy", the opening song from the album Froot, discusses her battle with depression, while the whole record is dedicated to celebrating happiness. The song was preceded by tracks from previous records such as "Numb", "Are You Satisfied?", "Living Dead", and "Teen Idle", which were written about her depression from her teenage years and twenties. In 2017, she began a Tumblr blog named "Marinabook" where she discussed a variety of topics surrounding mental health. To celebrate World Mental Health Day 2017 (and her 32nd birthday), Diamandis posted an essay about her battle with her mental health struggles. Over the years she attended various psychology courses, which earned her an alias of a "pop psychologist".

In July 2023, Diamandis opened up on Instagram about her diagnosis of chronic fatigue syndrome. She wrote that her energy had been very low for a while and she attributed her illness to chronic stress. In her twenties, Diamandis suffered from bulimia, an experience which partly inspired her debut poetry collection, Eat the World, which was published in 2024.

== Discography ==
- The Family Jewels (2010)
- Electra Heart (2012)
- Froot (2015)
- Love + Fear (2019)
- Ancient Dreams in a Modern Land (2021)
- Princess of Power (2025)

== Tours ==
Headlining

- The Family Jewels Tour (2010–2011)
- The Lonely Hearts Club Tour (2012–2013)
- Neon Nature Tour (2015–2016)
- Love + Fear Tour (2019)
- Ancient Dreams in a Modern Land Tour (2022)
- The Princess of Power Tour (2025–2026)

Supporting

- Katy Perry – California Dreams Tour (2011)
- Coldplay – Mylo Xyloto Tour (2011–2012)
- Panic! at the Disco – Viva Las Vengeance Tour (2022–2023)

== Bibliography ==
- Eat the World: A Collection of Poems (2024)

== Awards and nominations ==
Year	Organisation	Work	Award	Result	Ref.
2010	BBC Sound of 2010	Herself	Sound of 2010	Second place	
2010	Sweden GAFFA Awards	Herself	Best Foreign New Act	Won	
2010	Brit Awards	Herself	Critics' Choice	Nominated	
2010	BT Digital Music Awards	Herself	Breakthrough Artist of the Year	Nominated	
2010	MTV Europe Music Awards	Herself	Best UK & Ireland Act	Won	
2010	MTV Europe Music Awards	Herself	Best European Act	Nominated	
2010	Virgin Media Music Awards	Herself	Best Newcomer	Won	
2010	UK Festival Awards	Herself	Best Breakthrough Act	Nominated	
2010	UK Festival Awards	Herself	Feel-Good Act of the Summer	Nominated	
2010	UK Festival Awards	Secret Garden Party	Best Headline Performance	Nominated	
2010	UK Festival Awards	"I Am Not a Robot"	Anthem of the Year	Nominated	
2010	Popjustice £20 Music Prize	"I Am Not a Robot"	Best British Pop Single	Nominated	
2011	Glamour Awards	Herself	Best UK Solo Artist	Nominated	
2012	Attitude Magazine Awards	Herself	Best Music Award	Won	
2012	NME Awards	Herself	Hottest Female	Nominated	
2012	Popjustice £20 Music Prize	"Power & Control"	Best British Pop Single	Nominated	
2015	Popjustice £20 Music Prize	"I'm a Ruin"	Best British Pop Single	Nominated	
2016	Gay Music Chart Awards	"True Colors"	Best Cover	Nominated	
2019	Popjustice £20 Music Prize	"Baby" (with Clean Bandit & Luis Fonsi)	Best British Pop Single	Nominated	
2020	People's Choice Awards	"About Love"	Soundtrack Song of 2020	Nominated	
2021	Ivor Novello Awards	"Man's World"	Best Song Musically and Lyrically	Nominated	
2021	BreakTudo Awards	"New America"	Hit of the Year	Nominated	
