= List of songs recorded by Olly Murs =

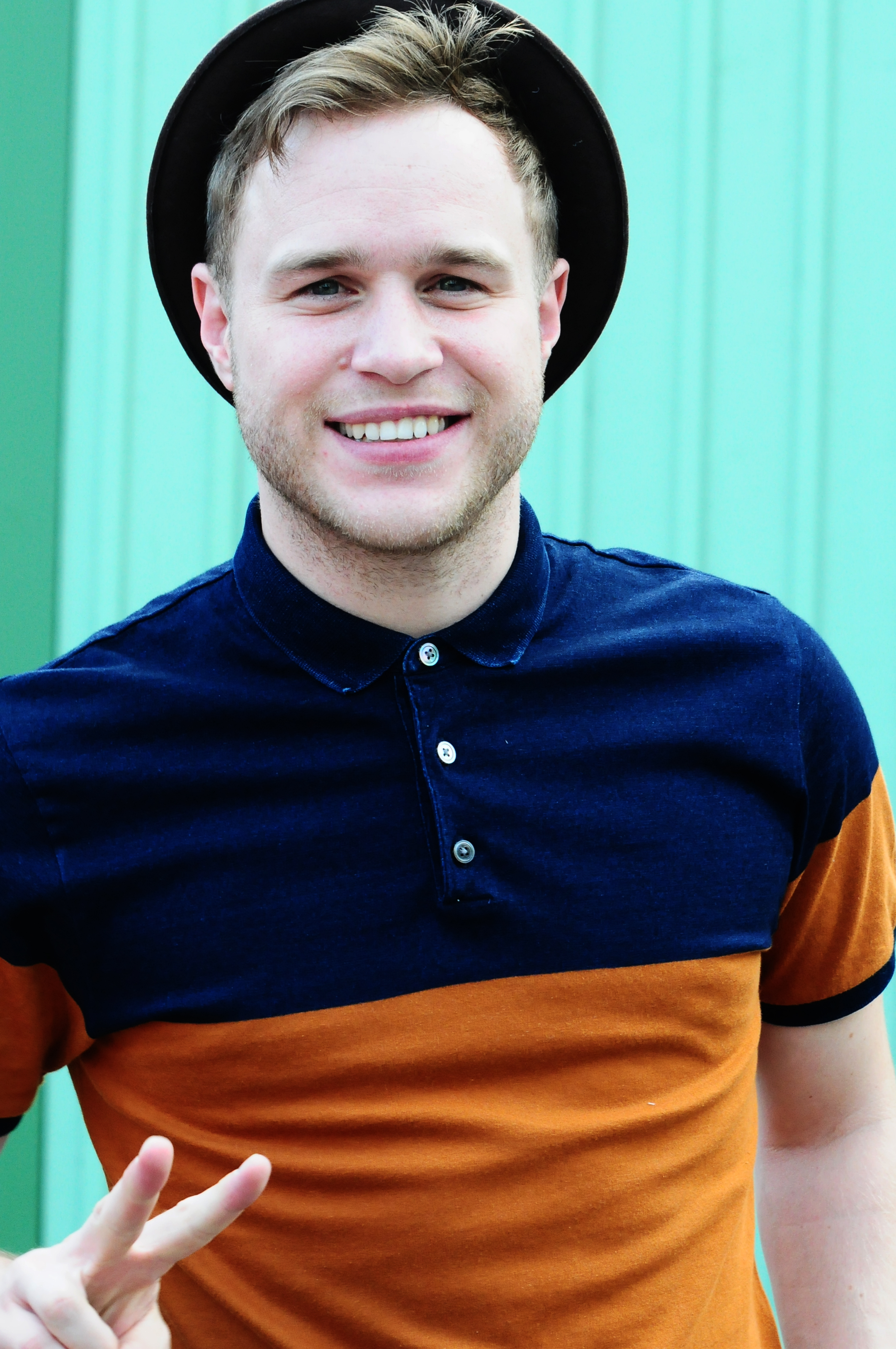
Murs in 2012

The English singer and songwriter Olly Murs has recorded songs for five studio albums and collaborated with other artists on their respective singles. The singer came to prominence after he finished in second place on the sixth series of The X Factor in 2009, losing to Joe McElderry. While competing on the show, Murs, along with the other finalists, was featured on a cover of "You Are Not Alone" originally performed by Michael Jackson. Released as a charity single, the proceeds were donated to Great Ormond Street Hospital. Despite being the runner-up, Simon Cowell's record label Syco revealed that they had signed Murs as a joint-venture with Epic following the show in February 2010. The singer began to work on his self-titled debut studio album, which was released on 26 November 2010. The album was preceded by the release of its lead single, reggae-pop track "Please Don't Let Me Go". Lyrically, "Please Don't Let Me Go" is based on a previous relationship of Murs', in which the woman did not love him back, he asks her not to let go of him so soon. Some of the tracks present Murs as being critical of his ex-girlfriends' new boyfriend, including "A Million More Years" and the second single, "Thinking of Me". Written by Adam Argyle and Martin Brammer, "I Blame Hollywood" draws influence from pop rock. Murs co-wrote the song "Love Shines Down" with Ed Sheeran, and it features guest vocalist Jessie J, while "Heart on My Sleeve" is a cover song written by James Morrison and originally performed by Michael Johns.

Murs' second studio album, the retro-pop themed In Case You Didn't Know, was released on 25 November 2011. The composition of "Oh My Goodness" is composed of an organ and horns, while the title track, "Heart Skips a Beat" and "Tell the World" draw influence from reggae. "Dance with Me Tonight" is a 1950s saxophone style record with elements of Doo-wop, while the track "Just Smile" is reminiscent of the work of Burt Bacharach. The disco-pop themed Right Place Right Time, Murs' third studio album, was released on 26 November 2012. Murs co-wrote the majority of the album with songwriters Steve Robson, Wayne Hector and Ed Drewett. "Troublemaker" was released as the lead single from the album, and it features Flo Rida. Lyrically, it documents Murs' obsession for a woman who he knows is not good for him but he cannot resist her, while Flo Rida delivers a rap verse explaining why he finds alluring women attractive. The BBC's critic John Aizlewood described album tracks "Head to Toe" as adult-themed and "Dear Darlin'" as solemn in its composition.

Murs' fourth studio album, Never Been Better, was released on 20 November 2014. Murs stated that he wanted the album to have a more serious tone and less of a "cheeky" style owing to him turning 30 years old. Travie McCoy and Demi Lovato feature on the songs "Wrapped Up" and "Up", respectively. The former is a funk track which whereby Murs suggestively sings "You got the lock, I got the key/ You know the rest, you know just where I want to be," while the latter is a folk song about the "merits of perseverance". The song "Stick with Me" addresses loneliness, while the piano-ballad "Tomorrow" documents how difficult it is to hold onto "fleeting private moments" when in the public eye. Murs co-wrote the track "Let Me In" with Paul Weller, which was described by Neil McCormick of The Daily Telegraph as "unexpected". Digital Spy writer Amy Davison likened the disco track "Did You Miss Me?" to Justin Timberlake's song "Take Back the Night".

== Songs ==
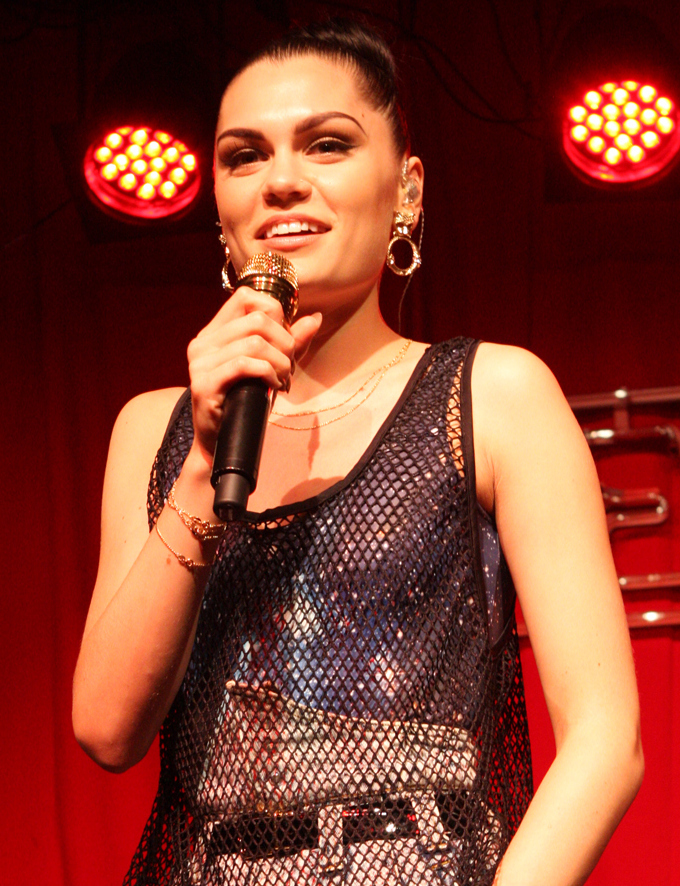
English singer Jessie J was featured on "Love Shined Down", 2010

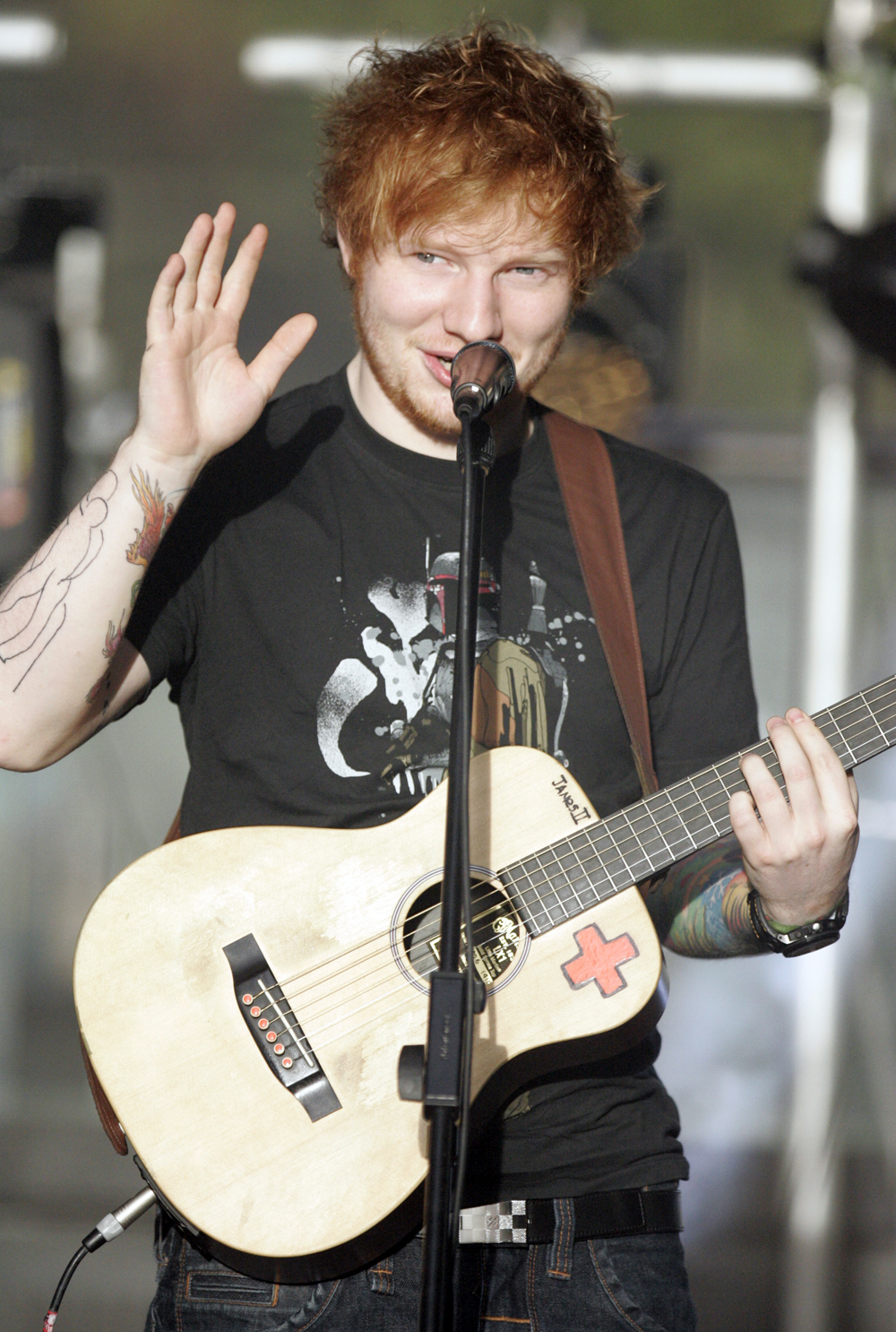
Singer-songwriter Ed Sheeran co-wrote "Love Shine Down" which was sung by Murs and Jessie J

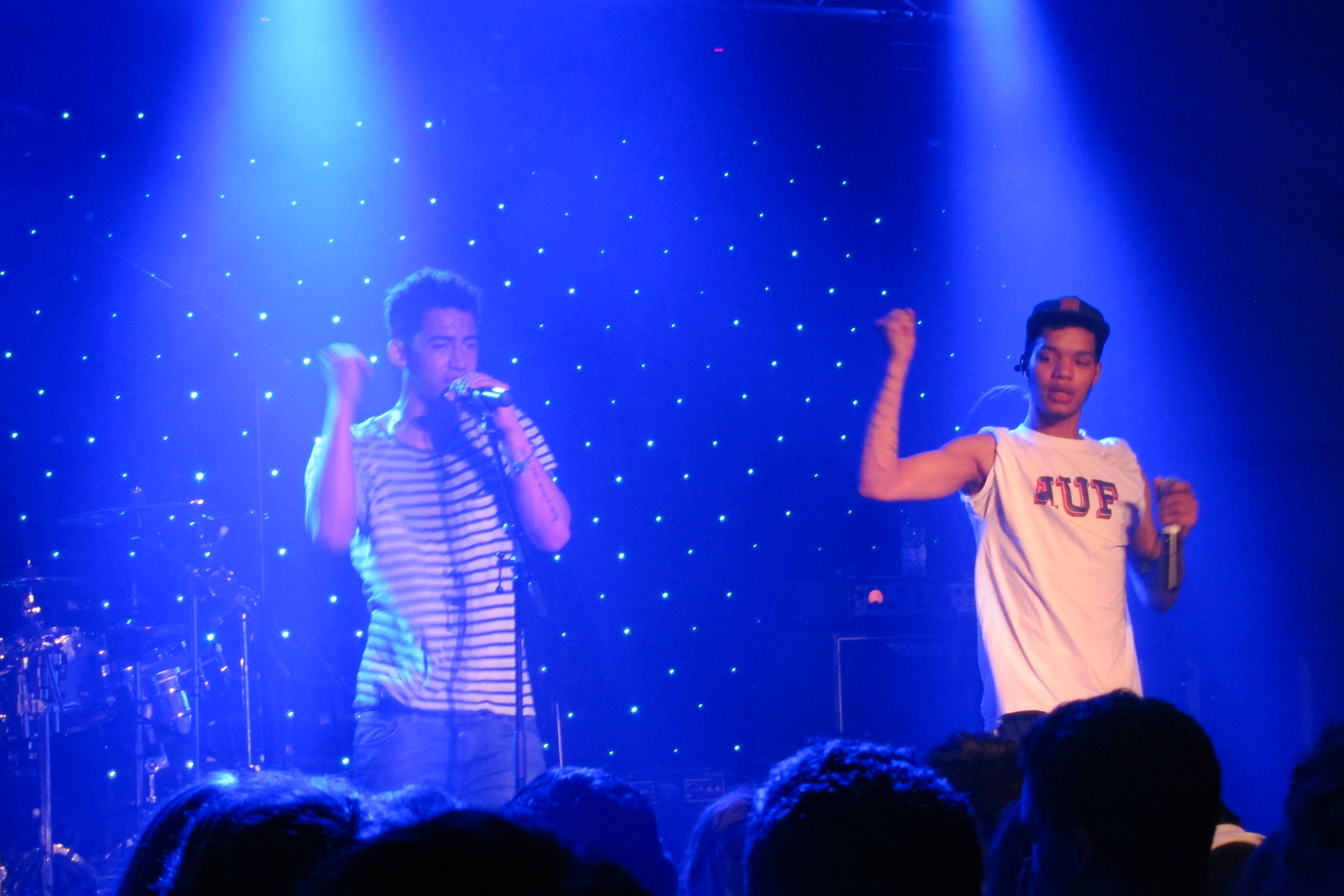
British hip hop duo Rizzle Kicks performed rap verses on the original version of "Heart Skips a Beat"

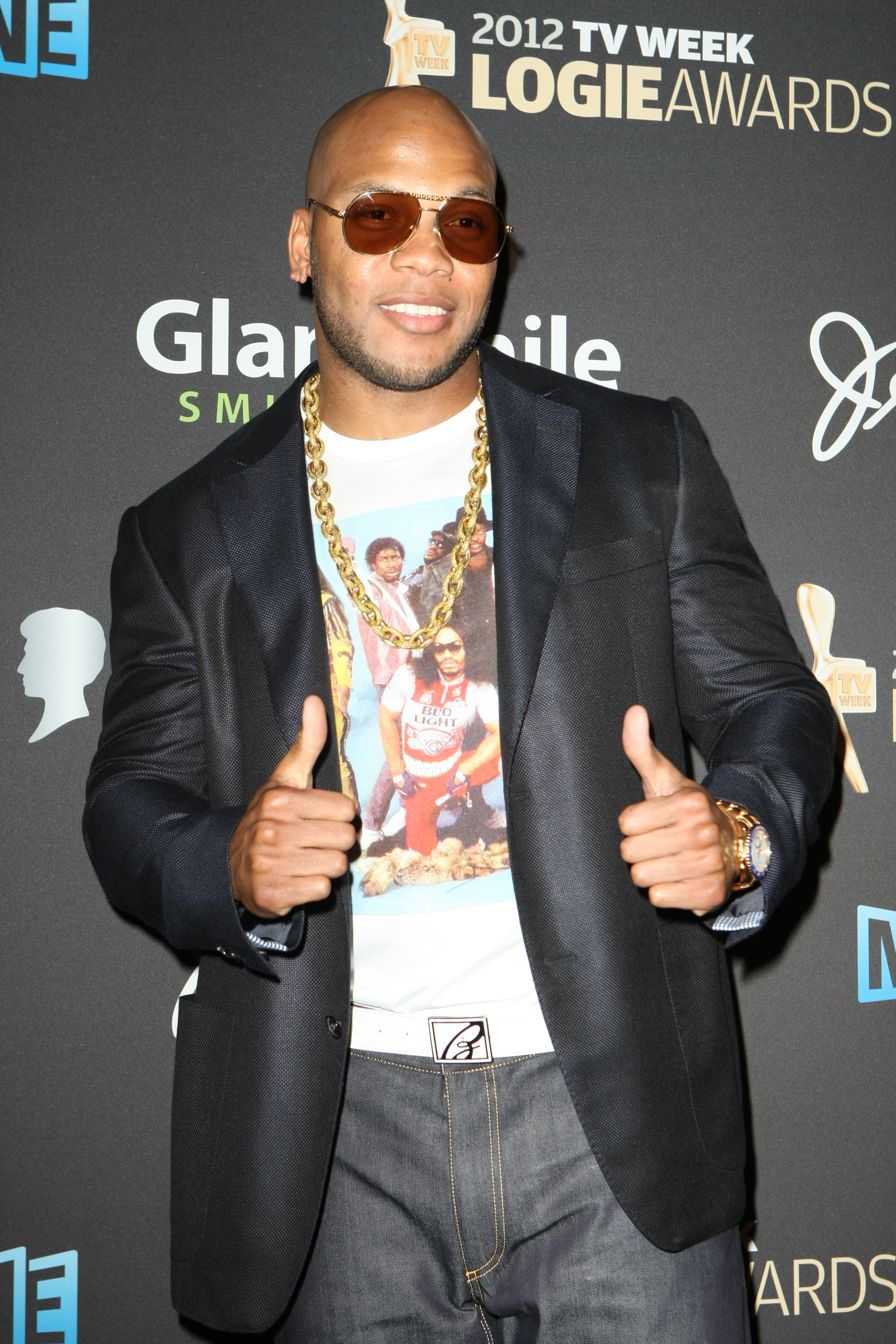
American rapper Flo Rida was featured on "Troublemaker" in 2012

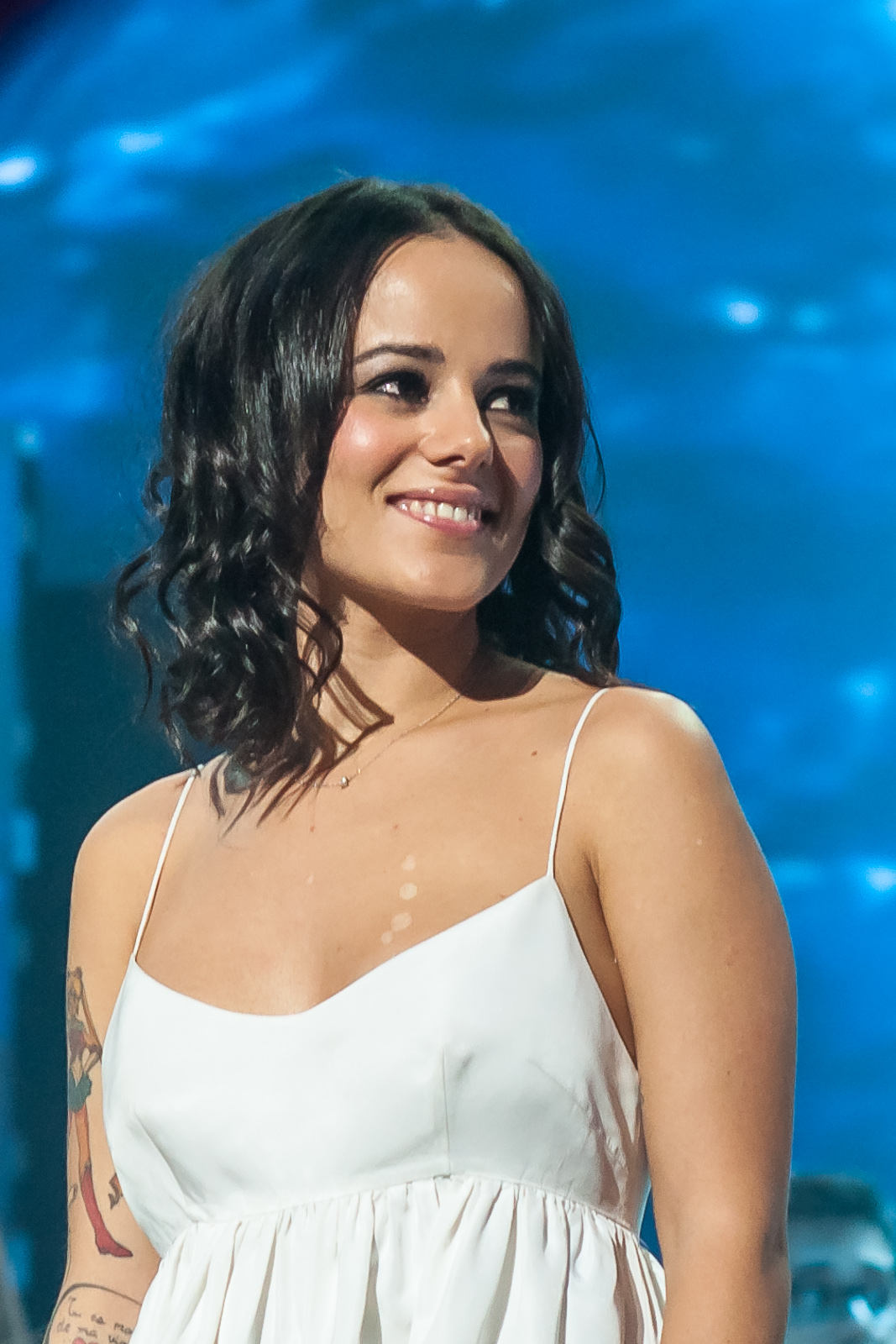
French singer Alizée was featured on a remix of "Dear Darlin'" which was placed on the special edition of Right Place, Right Time

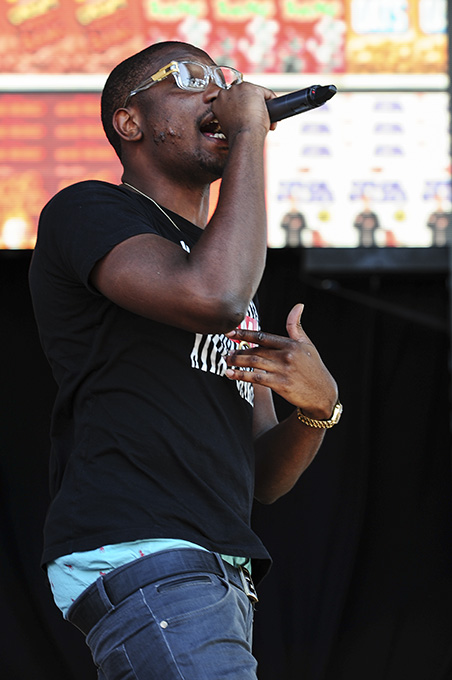
American rapper Chiddy Bang was featured on the remix of "Heart Skips a Beat" which was released in Canada and the United States

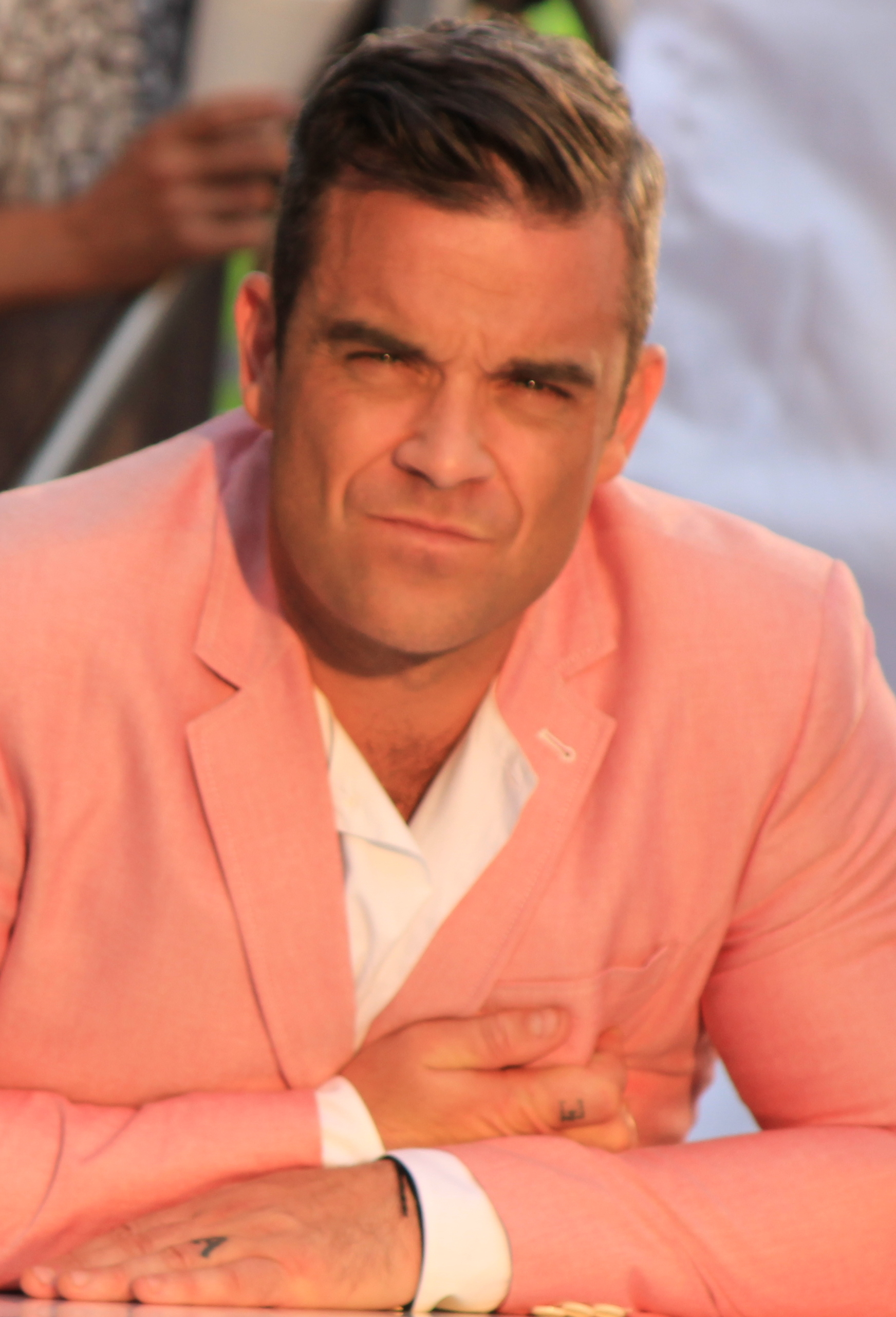
Murs and Robbie Williams recorded a version of "I Wan'na Be like You" for Williams's 2013 album, Swings Both Ways

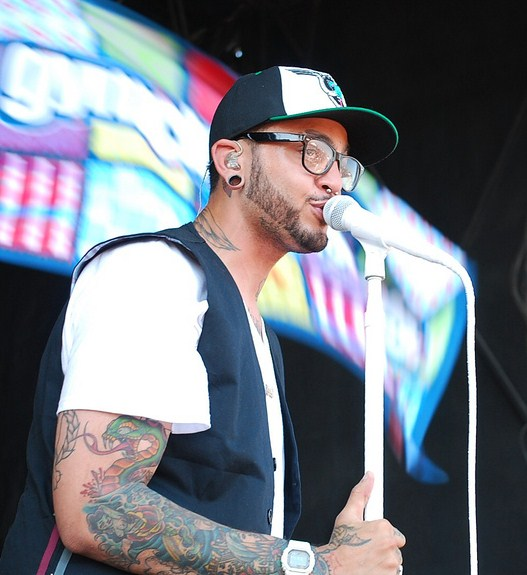
American rapper Travie McCoy was featured on "Wrapped Up" in 2014

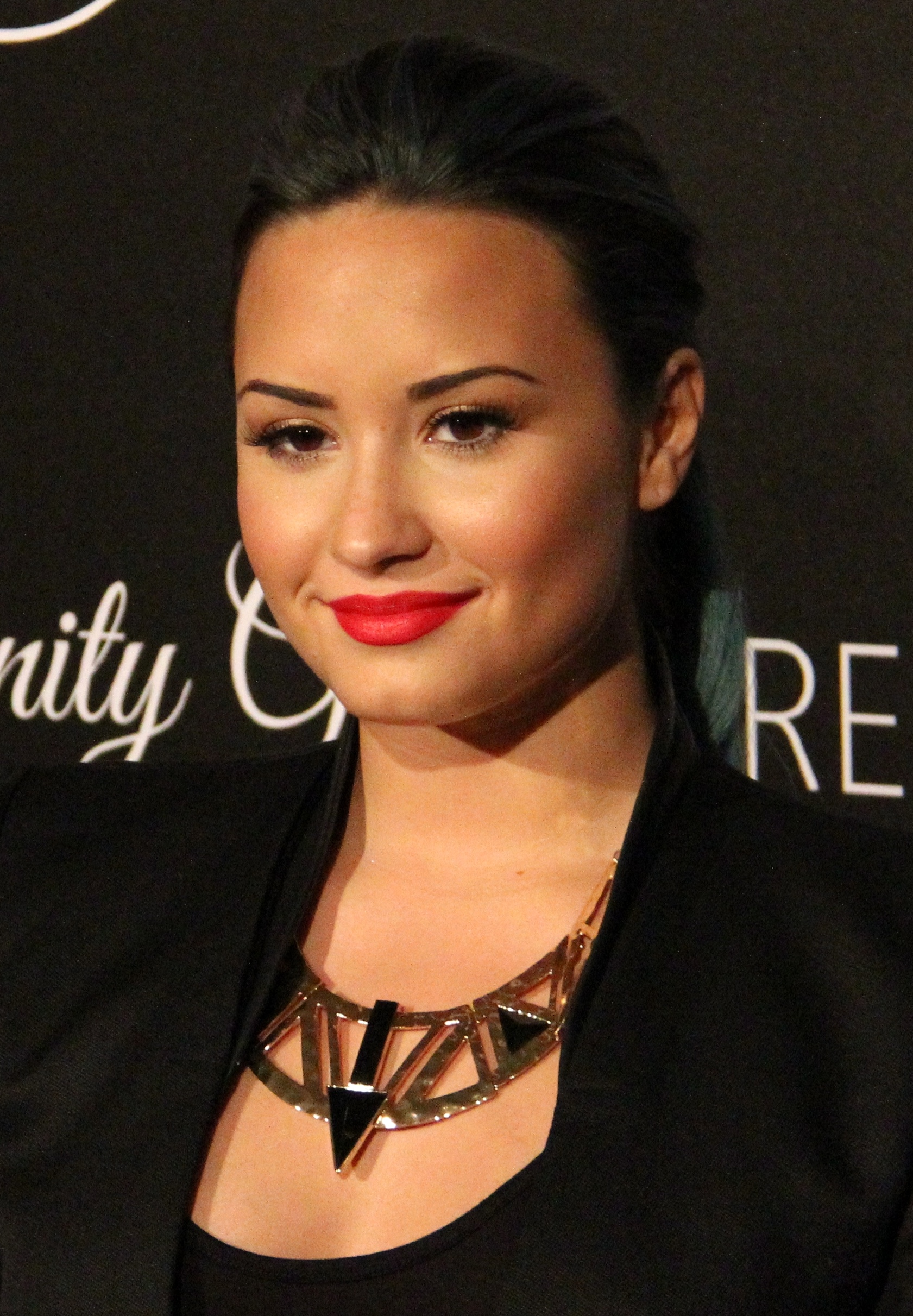
Singer Demi Lovato and Murs collaborated on "Up"

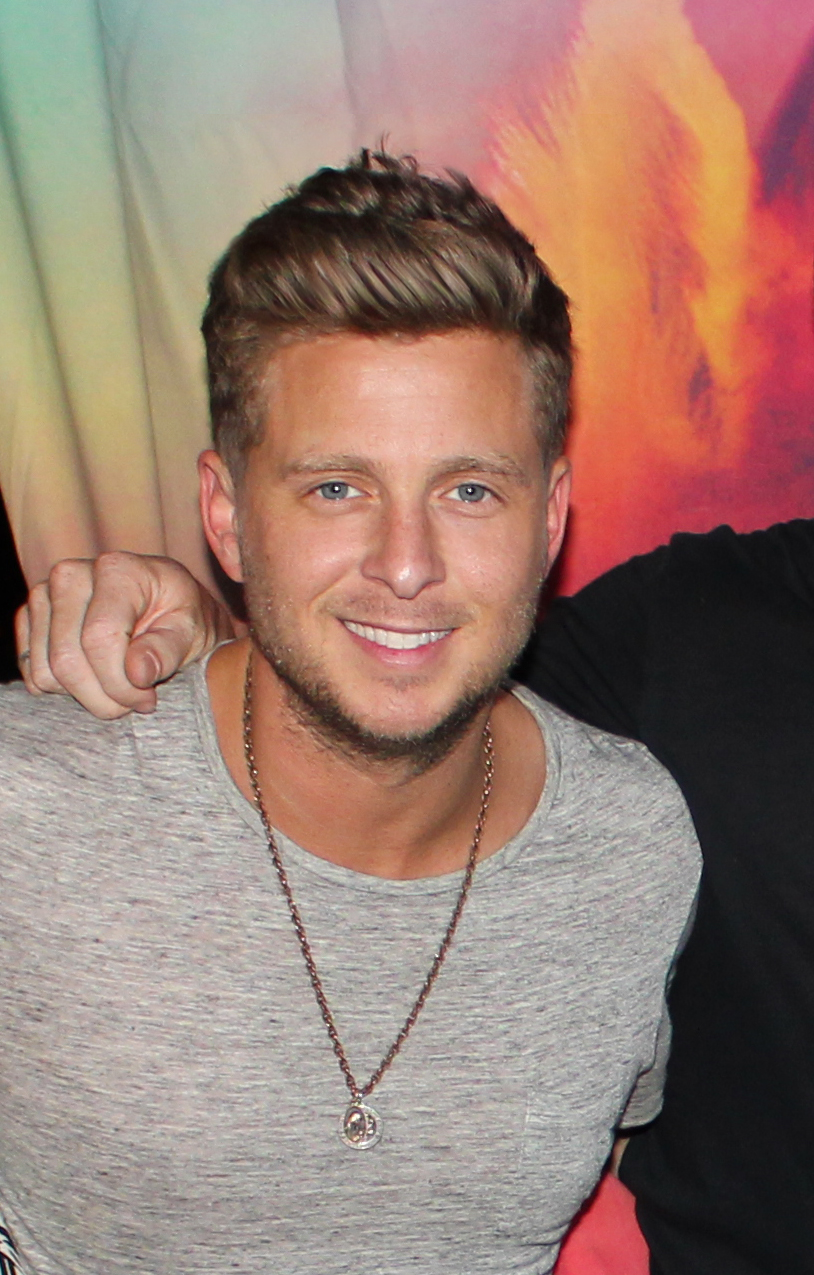
American singer-songwriter Ryan Tedder co-wrote "Seasons", which was released as a single in 2015

Name of song, songwriters, originating album and year of release.
| Song | Songwriter(s) | Album | Year | Ref. |
|---|---|---|---|---|
| "24 Hrs" | Olly Murs; Steve Robson; Clarence Coffee Jr. Janee Bennett | 24 Hrs | 2016 | |
| "Accidental" | Olly Murs; Paddy Byrne | Olly Murs | 2010 | |
| "Alone Tonight" | Olly Murs; Wayne Hector; Iyiola Babalola; Darren Lewis | Never Been Better | 2014 | |
| "Anywhere Else" | Olly Murs; Chris Braide; Chris Difford | Olly Murs | 2010 | |
| "Army of Two" | Olly Murs; Wayne Hector; Iyiola Babalola; Darren Lewis | Right Place Right Time | 2012 | |
| "Baby Blue Eyes" | Olly Murs; Paddy Byrne | B-side to "Dance with Me Tonight" | 2012 | |
| "Back Around" | Olly Murs; Steve Robson; Wayne Hector; Claude Kelly | 24 Hrs | 2016 | |
| "Beautiful to Me" | Olly Murs; Martin Johnson; Steve Robson; Sam Hollander | Never Been Better | 2014 | |
| "Before You Go" | Olly Murs; Jason Dean; Joseph Kirkland; Stefan Forrest; Morten Ristorp | 24 Hrs | 2016 | |
| "Better Than Me" | Olly Murs; Wayne Hector; Carl Falk | 24 Hrs | 2016 | |
| "Better Without You" | Olly Murs; Steve Robson; Clarence Coffee Jr. Ina Wroldsen | 24 Hrs | 2016 | |
| "Busy" | Olly Murs; Adam Argyle; Martin Brammer | Olly Murs | 2010 | |
| "C'Mon C'Mon" | Olly Murs; Mads Hauge | B-side to "Heart on My Sleeve" | 2010 | |
| "Can't Say No" | Olly Murs; Steve Robson; Claude Kelly | Never Been Better | 2014 | |
| "Change is Gonna Come" | Olly Murs; Matt Prime; Blair MacKichan | Olly Murs | 2010 | |
| "Charity Song" with Chris Moyles, Davina McColl, Pixie Lott, Gary Barlow, Ed Sheeran, Danny O'Donoghue, Robbie Williams, James Corden, Ricky Wilson | Sandy Beech; Dave Bethell; Chris Moyles | The Difficult Second Album | 2012 | |
| "Cry Your Heart Out" | Olly Murs; Wayne Hector; Lucas Secon; Carsten Mortensen | Right Place Right Time | 2012 | |
| "Dance with Me Tonight" | Olly Murs; Claude Kelly; Steve Robson | In Case You Didn't Know (Note: Originally included on In Case You Didn't Know, it was later included on the Japanese and the U.S. versions of Right Place Right Time.) | 2011 | |
| "Dear Darlin'" | Olly Murs; Jim Eliot; Ed Drewett | Right Place Right Time | 2012 | |
| "Dear Darlin'" featuring Alizée | Olly Murs; Jim Eliot; Ed Drewett | Right Place Right Time: Special Edition | 2013 | |
| "Deeper" | Olly Murs; Steve Mac; Clarence Coffee Jr. Chelcee Grimes | 24 Hrs | 2016 | |
| "Did I Lose You" with Giorgia | Alex James; Lauren Evans; Busbee | Senza Paura | 2013 | |
| "Did You Miss Me?" | Olly Murs; Jason Evigan; Sean Douglas | Never Been Better | 2014 | |
| "Don't Say Goodbye" | Olly Murs; Mark Taylor; Samuel Preston | Olly Murs | 2010 | |
| "Don't Say Goodnight Yet" | Olly Murs; Adam Argyle; Martin Brammer | B-side to "Oh My Goodness" | 2012 | |
| "Flaws" | Olly Murs; Steve Robson; Clarence Coffee Jr. Ina Wroldsen | 24 Hrs | 2016 | |
| "Grow Up" | Olly Murs; Steve Robson; Camille Purcell; Wayne Hector | 24 Hrs | 2016 | |
| "Hand on Heart" | Olly Murs; Wayne Hector; Iain James; Ben Kohn, Tom Barnes & Pete Kelleher | Right Place Right Time | 2012 | |
| "Head to Toe" | Olly Murs; Claude Kelly; Charles Harmon | Right Place Right Time | 2012 | |
| "Heart on My Sleeve" | John Shanks; James Morrison | Olly Murs | 2010 | |
| "Heart Skips a Beat" featuring Rizzle Kicks | Olly Murs; Jim Eliot; Samuel Preston; Alex Smith; Jordan Stephens & Harley Alexander-Sule | In Case You Didn't Know (Note: Originally included on Olly Murs, it was later included on the Japanese deluxe version of Right Place Right Time.) | 2011 | |
| "Heart Skips a Beat" featuring Chiddy Bang | Olly Murs; Jim Eliot; Samuel Preston; Alex Smith; Chidera Anamege | Right Place Right Time (Note: Included on the Canadian and U.S. versions of Right Place Right Time only.) | 2013 | |
| "Hey You Beautiful" | Olly Murs; Claude Kelly; Steve Robson | Right Place Right Time | 2012 | |
| "History" | Olly Murs; Steve Robson; Claude Kelly | Never Been Better | 2014 | |
| "Hold On" | Olly Murs; Jerry Abbott; Grant Black; Julian Velard; Paul Williams | Olly Murs | 2010 | |
| "Hope You Got What You Came For" | Olly Murs; Steve Robson; Wayne Hector | Never Been Better | 2014 | |
| "How Much for Your Love" | Olly Murs; Steve Robson; Clarence Coffee Jr. Janee Bennett | 24 Hrs | 2016 | |
| "I Blame Hollywood" | Adam Argyle; Martin Brammer | Olly Murs | 2010 | |
| "I Don't Love You Too" | Olly Murs; Claude Kelly; Steve Robson | In Case You Didn't Know | 2011 | |
| "I Need You Now" | Olly Murs; Adam Argyle; Martin Brammer | Olly Murs | 2010 | |
| "I Wan'na Be Like You" with Robbie Williams | Richard M. Sherman; Robert B. Sherman | Swings Both Ways | 2013 | |
| "I'm OK" | Olly Murs; Wayne Hector; Alex Smith | In Case You Didn't Know | 2011 | |
| "I've Tried Everything" | Olly Murs; Adam Argyle; Martin Brammer | In Case You Didn't Know | 2011 | |
| "If I Stay" | Olly Murs; Martin Johnson; Sam Hollander | Never Been Better: Special Edition | 2015 | |
| "In Case You Didn't Know" | Olly Murs; Claude Kelly; Steve Robson | In Case You Didn't Know | 2011 | |
| "Inner Ninja" featuring Classified | Luke Boyd; Mark Pellizzer; David Myles; Mike Boyd | Right Place Right Time: Special Edition | 2013 | |
| "Just Smile" | Olly Murs; Karen Poole; Matt Prime | In Case You Didn't Know | 2011 | |
| "Kiss Me" | Olly Murs; Zacharie Raymond; Yannick Rastogi; Steve Robson; Gary Derussy; Lindy Robbins; Taio Cruz | Never Been Better: Special Edition | 2015 | |
| "Look at the Sky" | Hachidai Nakamura | Never Been Better (Note: Included exclusively on the Japanese deluxe edition of Never Been Better.) | 2014 | |
| "Love Shine Down" featuring Jessie J | Olly Murs; Jason Pebworth; George Astasio; Jon Shave; Dan Smith; Ed Sheeran | Olly Murs | 2010 | |
| "Love Shouldn't Be This Hard" | Olly Murs; Toby Gad | Never Been Better: Special Edition | 2015 | |
| "Let Me In" | Olly Murs; Paul Weller | Never Been Better | 2014 | |
| "Loud and Clear" | Olly Murs; Claude Kelly; Charles Harmon | Right Place Right Time | 2012 | |
| "Love You More" | Ed Drewett; Edvard Erfjord; Andrew Jackson; Henrik Michelsen; Matt Rad | 24 Hrs | 2016 | |
| "A Million More Years" | Lol Creme; Matt Schwartz | Olly Murs | 2010 | |
| "Never Been Better" | Olly Murs; Wayne Hector; Ben Kohn, Tom Barnes & Pete Kelleher | Never Been Better | 2014 | |
| "Not That Polite" with Chris Moyles | Claude Kelly; Chris Moyles; Olly Murs; Steve Robson | The Difficult Second Album | 2012 | |
| "Nothing Without You" | Olly Murs; Iain James; Mike Posner; Ben Kohn, Tom Barnes & Pete Kelleher | Never Been Better | 2014 | |
| "Oh My Goodness" | Olly Murs; Adam Argyle; Martin Brammer | In Case You Didn't Know | 2011 | |
| "On My Cloud" | Olly Murs; Mark Taylor; Samuel Preston | In Case You Didn't Know | 2011 | |
| "The One" | Olly Murs; Adam Arg; Prime | Right Place Right Time: Special Edition (Note: Included exclusively on the Japanese version of Right Place Right Time: Special Edition.) | 2013 | |
| "One of These Days" | Olly Murs; Andrew Fampton; Julian Bunetta; Steve Kipner | Right Place Right Time | 2012 | |
| "Perfect Night (to Say Goodbye)" | Olly Murs; Martin Brammer; Adam Argyle | Right Place Right Time: Special Edition | 2013 | |
| "Personal" | Olly Murs; Wayne Hector; Christopher Houston; Ben Kohn, Tom Barnes & Pete Kelleher | Right Place Right Time | 2012 | |
| "Please Don't Let Me Go" | Olly Murs; Claude Kelly; Steve Robson | Olly Murs | 2010 | |
| "Private" | Olly Murs; Tom Barnes; Ben Kohn; Peter Kelleher; Uzoechi Emenike | 24 Hrs | 2016 | |
| "Read My Mind" | Olly Murs; Steve Robson; Ed Drewett; James Newman | 24 Hrs | 2016 | |
| "Ready for Love" | Olly Murs; Jamie Scott; Matt Prime; Phil Cook | Never Been Better | 2014 | |
| "Right Place Right Time" | Olly Murs; Claude Kelly; Steve Robson | Right Place Right Time | 2012 | |
| "Runaway" | Olly Murs; Martin Brammer; Adam Argyle | Right Place Right Time: Special Edition | 2013 | |
| "Sacrifice" | Olly Murs; Steve Robson; Claude Kelly | Never Been Better: Special Edition | 2015 | |
| "Seasons" | Ryan Tedder; Ammar Malik; Noel Zancanella | Never Been Better | 2014 | |
| "Sliding Doors" | Olly Murs; Steve Robson; Wayne Hector | Right Place Right Time: Special Edition | 2013 | |
| "Sophie" | Olly Murs; James Bryan; George Astasio; Jason Pebworth; Jon Shave | B-side to "Thinking of Me" | 2010 | |
| "Stevie Knows" | Alexander Izquierdo; Ian Kirkpatrick; Sam Martin | Never Been Better: Special Edition | 2015 | |
| "Stick with Me" | Steve Mac; Wayne Hector; John Newman | Never Been Better | 2014 | |
| "Stop Tryna Change Me" | Olly Murs; Claude Kelly; John Lardieri; Charles Harmon | Right Place Right Time: Special Edition | 2013 | |
| "Takes a Lot" | Olly Murs; Phil Thornalley; John Green | B-side to "Busy" | 2011 | |
| "Tell the World" | Olly Murs; Andrew Frampton; Patrick Jordan-Patrikios; Abeeku 'Bayku' Ribeiro | In Case You Didn't Know | 2011 | |
| "That Girl" | Olly Murs; Steve Robson; Clarence Coffee Jr. Ina Wroldsen | 24 Hrs | 2016 | |
| "That's Alright with Me" | Olly Murs; Samuel Preston; Mark Taylor | Right Place Right Time: Special Edition | 2013 | |
| "Thinking of Me" | Olly Murs; Wayne Hector; Steve Robson | Olly Murs | 2010 | |
| "This One's for the Girls" | Olly Murs; James Bryan; George Astasio; Jason Pebworth; Jon Shave | B-side to "Please Don't Let Me Go" | 2010 | |
| "This Song Is About You" | Olly Murs; Claude Kelly; Steve Robson | In Case You Didn't Know | 2011 | |
| "Troublemaker" featuring Flo Rida | Olly Murs; Claude Kelly; Steve Robson; Tramar Dillard | Right Place Right Time | 2012 | |
| "Unpredictable" | Mich Hansen; Daniel Davidsen; Peter Wallevik; Kara DioGuardi; Iain James | 24 Hrs | 2016 | |
| "Up" featuring Demi Lovato | Wayne Hector; Daniel Davidsen; Maegan Cottone; Peter Wallevik; Mich Hansen | Never Been Better | 2014 | |
| "Us Against the World" | Olly Murs; Jamie Scott; Toby Smith | Never Been Better | 2014 | |
| "We Still Love" | Olly Murs; Steve Robson; Sam Romans | Never Been Better | 2014 | |
| "What a Buzz" | Julian Bunetta; John Ryan; Ed Drewett | Right Place Right Time | 2012 | |
| "Why Do I Love You" | Olly Murs; Jamie Scott; Ben Kohn, Tom Barnes & Pete Kelleher | Never Been Better | 2014 | |
| "Wrapped Up" featuring Travie McCoy | Olly Murs; Travie McCoy; Steve Robson; Claude Kelly | Never Been Better | 2014 | |
| "Years & Years" | Olly Murs; Wayne Hector; Steve Mac | 24 Hrs | 2016 | |
| "You Are Not Alone" performed by X Factor Finalists 2009 | R. Kelly | Charity single release | 2009 | |
| "You Don't Know Love" | Olly Murs; Steve Robson; Camille Purcell; Wayne Hector | 24 Hrs | 2016 | |

== See also ==
- Olly Murs discography
