= Olly Murs discography =

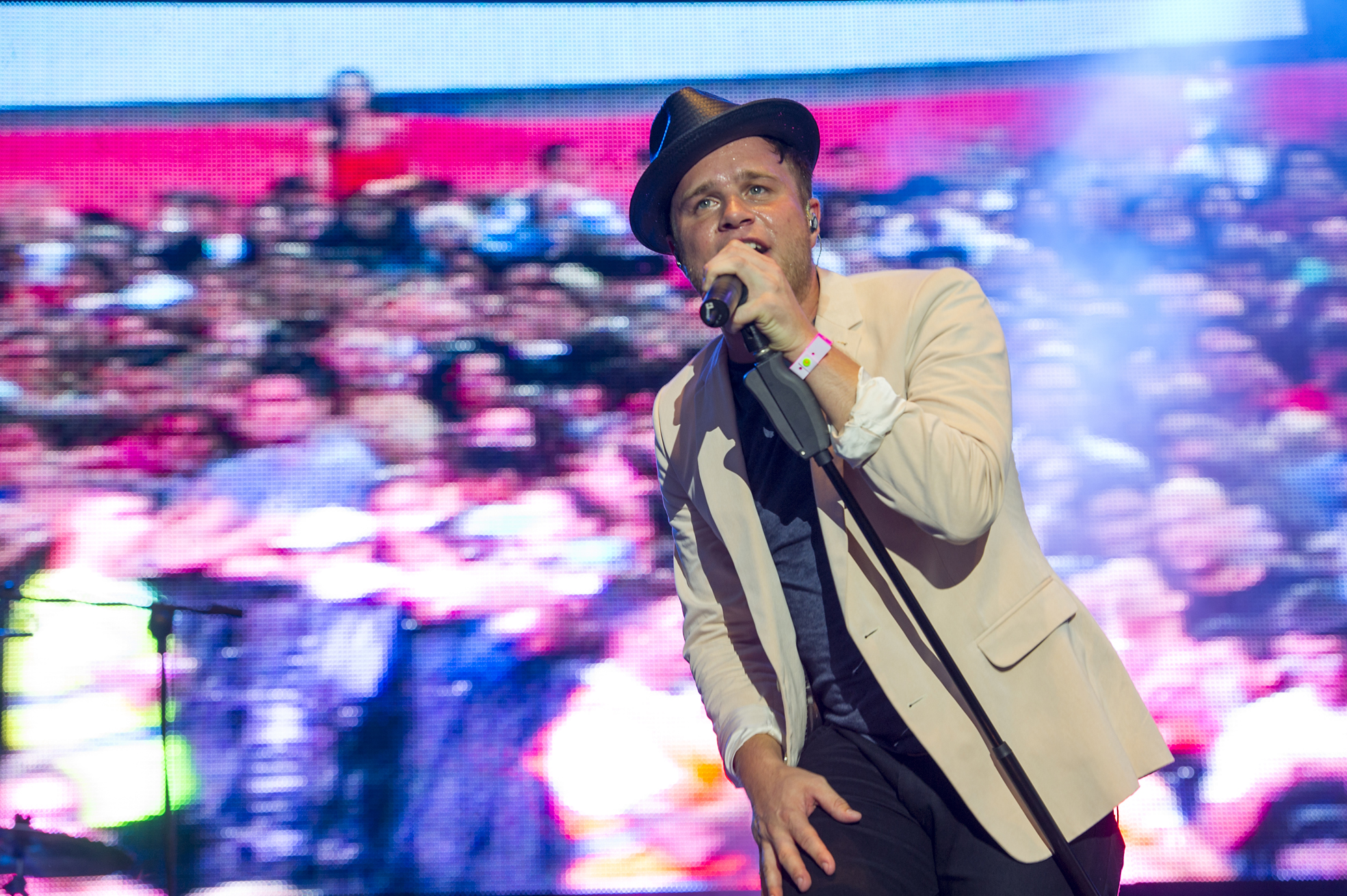
- Murs at Gibraltar Music Festival 2013
- Studio albums: 8
- Extended plays: 3
- Singles: 30
- Music videos: 28
- Other charted songs: 6

English recording artist Olly Murs has released eight studio albums, thirty singles and twenty one music videos on recording labels Epic and Sony subsidiary Syco. Olly rose to prominence in the United Kingdom after being a contestant on The X Factor during its sixth series, ultimately finishing in second place on 12 December 2009. During his time on the show, Murs appeared on the number-one charity single "You Are Not Alone" alongside the other finalists. His debut single, "Please Don't Let Me Go" was released on 27 August 2010—where it became his second number-one single and first as a solo artist. The accompanying album, Olly Murs was released on 26 November, where it debuted at number two, and was preceded by the number four single "Thinking of Me" on 19 November. The singles "Heart on My Sleeve" and "Busy" were also released from the album on 27 March and 27 May 2011—peaking at number twenty and forty-five in the UK respectively.

Second album, In Case You Didn't Know was released on 28 November 2011, debuting at number-one in the United Kingdom. The lead single, "Heart Skips a Beat", which featured rap duo Rizzle Kicks, was released on 19 August 2011. The single debuted at number-one in the UK with weekly sales of over 109,000 copies—also topping the charts in Germany and Switzerland and reaching the top ten in Austria and Ireland. The second single, "Dance with Me Tonight", preceded the album's release on 20 November and debuted at number two. In its third week charting, the single climbed to the number-one position, marking Murs' third solo number-one single. A third single, "Oh My Goodness" was released from the album on 2 April 2012, peaking at number thirteen in the UK.

Murs released his third studio album, Right Place Right Time, on 26 November 2012. The album's lead single, "Troublemaker" featuring American rapper Flo Rida, was released on 18 November and peaked at number one in the UK, his fourth number one to date. Murs released his fourth studio album, Never Been Better, on 24 November 2014 and the album's first single, "Wrapped Up" featuring Travie McCoy on 16 November 2014.

Murs' eighth studio album, was released on 21 November 2025; it was preceded by three singles: "Save Me", "Bonkers" and "Run This Town".

== Studio albums ==
List of studio albums, with selected chart positions, sales figures and certifications
Title	Details	Peak chart positions										Sales	Certifications
Title	Details	UK	AUS	AUT	CAN	GER	IRE	NZ	SWE	SWI	US	Sales	Certifications
Olly Murs	Released: 29 November 2010; Label: Epic, Syco; Formats: CD, digital download	2	—	—	—	—	11	—	—	—	—	UK: 834,000	BPI: 2× Platinum; IRMA: Gold
In Case You Didn't Know	Released: 25 November 2011; Label: Epic, Syco; Formats: CD, digital download	1	—	68	—	18	2	—	10	19	—	UK: 1,120,000	BPI: 3× Platinum; IRMA: 2× Platinum
Right Place Right Time	Released: 23 November 2012; Label: Epic, Syco, Columbia; Formats: CD, digital download	1	20	5	17	22	3	27	14	6	19	UK: 1,380,000; US: 71,000	BPI: 5× Platinum; ARIA: Gold; IFPI AUT: Gold; BVMI: Gold; IRMA: Platinum
Never Been Better	Released: 24 November 2014; Label: Epic, Syco; Formats: CD, digital download	1	27	40	43	38	7	—	50	20	42	UK: 863,000	BPI 3× Platinum
24 Hrs	Released: 11 November 2016; Label: RCA, Syco; Formats: CD, digital download	1	42	72	—	41	2	— (Note: 24 Hrs did not enter the NZ Top 40 Albums Chart, but peaked at number seven on the NZ Heatseekers Albums Chart.)	—	32	—	UK: 500,000	BPI: Platinum
You Know I Know	Released: 9 November 2018; Label: RCA; Formats: CD, LP, digital download	2	—	—	—	75	10	—	—	56	—	UK: 300,000	BPI: Platinum
Marry Me	Released: 2 December 2022; Label: EMI; Formats: Digital download, streaming	1	—	—	—	—	55	—	—	—	—		
Knees Up	Released: 21st November 2025; Label: BMG; Format: CD, LP, digital download, streaming	5	—	—	—	—	—	—	—	—	—		
"—" denotes releases that did not chart or were not released in that territory.

== Extended plays ==
List of extended plays
Title	Details
iTunes Festival: London 2012	Released: 3 September 2012; Label: Epic, Syco; Formats: Digital download
Unwrapped	Released: 12 December 2014; Label: Epic, Syco; Formats: Google Play
24 Hrs (Acoustic)	Released: 24 December 2016; Label: Epic, Syco; Formats: Digital download

== Singles ==
=== As lead artist ===
Title	Year	Peak chart positions										Certifications	Album
Title	Year	UK	AUS	AUT	CAN	GER	IRE	NZ	SWE	SWI	US	Certifications	Album
"Please Don't Let Me Go"	2010	1	—	—	—	—	5	—	—	—	—	BPI: Platinum	Olly Murs
"Thinking of Me"	2010	4	—	—	—	—	13	—	—	—	—	BPI: Gold	Olly Murs
"Heart on My Sleeve"	2011	20	—	—	—	—	—	—	—	—	—		Olly Murs
"Busy"	2011	45	—	—	—	—	—	—	—	—	—		Olly Murs
"Heart Skips a Beat" (featuring Rizzle Kicks)	2011	1	85	6	91	1	6	—	60	1	96	BPI: Platinum; IFPI AUT: Gold; BVMI: 3× Gold; IFPI SWI: 2× Platinum	In Case You Didn't Know
"Dance with Me Tonight"	2011	1	62	65	—	—	2	—	—	—	— (Note: "Dance with Me Tonight" did not enter the Billboard Hot 100, but peaked at number 23 on the Bubbling Under Hot 100 Singles chart.)	BPI: 3× Platinum; RMNZ: Platinum; ARIA: Gold; IFPI DAN: Gold	In Case You Didn't Know
"Oh My Goodness"	2012	13	—	27	—	24	13	—	—	—	—	BPI: Silver	In Case You Didn't Know
"Troublemaker" (featuring Flo Rida)	2012	1	4	3	15	1	3	2	31	8	25	BPI: 3× Platinum; ARIA: 3× Platinum; IFPI AUT: Gold; MC: 2× Platinum; BVMI: Gold; RMNZ: Platinum; IFPI SWE: Platinum; IFPI SWI: Gold; RIAA: Platinum	Right Place Right Time
"Army of Two"	2013	12	19	27	—	96	18	13	—	—	—	BPI: Silver; ARIA: Platinum	Right Place Right Time
"Dear Darlin'"	2013	5	4	1	83	2	8	29	38	5	—	BPI: Platinum; ARIA: 2× Platinum; IFPI AUT: Gold; BVMI: Platinum; IFPI SWI: Gold	Right Place Right Time
"Right Place Right Time"	2013	27	88	65	—	53	74	—	—	—	—		Right Place Right Time
"Hand on Heart"	2013	25	73	—	—	—	50	—	—	—	—		Right Place Right Time
"Wrapped Up" (featuring Travie McCoy)	2014	3	15	21	—	11	7	—	21	18	— (Note: "Wrapped Up" did not enter the US Billboard Hot 100, but peaked at number 40 on the US Pop Airplay Chart.)	BPI: Platinum; ARIA: Gold; RMNZ: Gold; IFPI SWE: Platinum	Never Been Better (Note: "Kiss Me" only appear on the special edition of Never Been Better.)
"Up" (featuring Demi Lovato)	2014	4	14	6	—	17	3	9	—	28	— (Note: "Up" did not enter the US Billboard Hot 100, but peaked at number 8 on the US Twitter Top Tracks Chart.)	BPI: 2× Platinum; ARIA: 2× Platinum; RMNZ: Platinum	Never Been Better
"Seasons"	2015	34	—	—	—	—	58	—	—	—	—		Never Been Better
"Beautiful to Me"	2015	93	—	—	—	—	—	—	—	—	—		Never Been Better
"Kiss Me"	2015	11	—	—	—	—	48	—	— (Note: "Kiss Me" did not enter the Swedish Singles Chart, but peaked at number two on the Swedish Heatseeker chart.)	—	—	BPI: Platinum	Never Been Better
"You Don't Know Love"	2016	15	77	57	—	76	54	— (Note: "You Don't Know Love" did not enter the NZ Top 40 Singles Chart, but peaked at number 4 on the NZ Heatseekers Singles Chart.)	40	90	—	BPI: Platinum; IFPI SWE: Gold	24 Hrs
"Grow Up"	2016	25	—	—	—	94	48	—	—	—	—	BPI: Silver	24 Hrs
"Years & Years"	2016	83	—	—	—	—	—	—	—	—	—		24 Hrs
"Unpredictable" (with Louisa Johnson)	2017	32	—	—	—	—	65	—	—	—	—	BPI: Gold	24 Hrs
"Moves" (Note: "Moves" also features on the Johnny English Strikes Again OST.) (featuring Snoop Dogg)	2018	46	— (Note: "Moves" did not enter the ARIA Singles Chart, but peaked at number 39 on the ARIA Digital Tracks Chart.)	—	—	—	—	—	—	—	—	BPI: Silver	You Know I Know
"That Girl"	2019	—	—	—	—	—	—	—	—	—	—	SME CHINA: Multi-platinum/all-time record award plaque (Note: "That Girl" by Olly Murs is not an officially certified single in the UK or major Western territories, but it achieved massive viral popularity and multiple sales certifications in China after surpassing over 4 billion streams and downloads in the region.)	24 Hrs
"Die of a Broken Heart"	2022	— (Note: "Die of a Broken Heart" did not enter the UK Top 100 Singles Chart, but debuted at number 19 on the UK Singles Downloads Chart Top 100.)	—	—	—	—	—	—	—	—	—		Marry Me
"I Hate You When You're Drunk"	2022	— (Note: "I Hate You When You're Drunk" did not enter the UK Top 100 Singles Chart, but debuted at number 45 on the UK Singles Downloads Chart Top 100.)	—	—	—	—	—	—	—	—	—		Marry Me
"Coming Off the Snow (The Miracle of Christmas)"	2022	—	—	—	—	—	—	—	—	—	—		Non-album single
"I Found Her"	2023	—	—	—	—	—	—	—	—	—	—		Marry Me
"Save Me"	2025	— (Note: "Save Me" did not enter the UK Singles Chart Top 100, but debuted at number 8 on the UK Singles Downloads Chart, and at number 10 on the UK Singles Sales Chart.)	—	—	—	—	—	—	—	—	—		Knees Up
"Bonkers"	2025	— (Note: "Bonkers" did not enter the UK Singles Chart, but peaked at number 25 on the UK Singles Downloads Chart Top 100.)	—	—	—	—	—	—	—	—	—		Knees Up
"Run This Town"	2025	—	—	—	—	—	—	—	—	—	—		Knees Up
"Christmas Starts Tonight" (with The Ordinary Boys	2025	— (Note: "Christmas Starts Tonight" did not enter the UK Singles Chart Top 100, but debuted at number 82 on the UK Singles Downloads Chart.)	—	—	—	—	—	—	—	—	—		Non-album single
"—" denotes releases that did not chart or were not released in that territory.

=== As featured artist ===
Title	Year	Peak chart positions				Certifications	Album
Title	Year	UK	AUS	IRE	NZ	Certifications	Album
"You Are Not Alone" (as part of The X Factor Finalists 2009)	2009	1	—	1	—	BPI: Gold	Non-album single
"Inner Ninja" (Classified featuring Olly Murs)	2013	—	60	37	33		Classified
"Do They Know It's Christmas?" (as part of Band Aid 30)	2014	1	3	1	2	BPI: Gold	Non-album single
"More Mess" (Kungs featuring Olly Murs and Coely)	2017	—	—	—	—		Non-album single
"—" denotes releases that did not chart or were not released in that territory.

=== Promotional singles ===
List of promotional singles
Title	Year	Album
"Stevie Knows"	2015	Never Been Better
"Back Around"	2016	24 Hrs
"Take Your Love"	2018	You Know I Know
"Excuses"	2018	You Know I Know
"Feel the Same"	2019	You Know I Know

== Other charted songs ==
Title	Year	Peak chart positions				Album
Title	Year	UK	AUT	GER	IRE	Album
"This One's for the Girls"	2010	69	—	—	—	B-side to "Please Don't Let Me Go"
"I Need You Now"	2011	199	—	—	—	In Case You Didn't Know
"I Wan'na Be like You" (Robbie Williams featuring Olly Murs)	2013	78	55	85	64	Swings Both Ways
"I Wish It Could Be Christmas Everyday"	2013	172	—	—	—	Right Place Right Time
"Never Been Better"	2014	80	—	—	—	Never Been Better
"Tomorrow"	2014	171	—	—	—	Never Been Better
"—" denotes releases that did not chart or were not released in that territory.

== Guest appearances ==
List of non-single guest appearances, with other performing artists, showing year released and album name
Title	Year	Other performer(s)	Album
"Without You"	2012	—N/a	BBC Radio 1's Live Lounge 2012
"Not That Polite"	2012	Chris Moyles	The Difficult Second Album
"Charity Song"	2012	Chris Moyles, Davina McCall, Pixie Lott, Gary Barlow, Ed Sheeran, Danny O'Donoghue, Robbie Williams, James Corden, Ricky Wilson	The Difficult Second Album
"Don't You Worry Child"	2013	—N/a	BBC Radio 1's Live Lounge 2013
"Did I Lose You"	2013	Giorgia	Senza paura
"Can't Stop the Feeling!/Rock Your Body"	2016	—N/a	BBC Radio 1's Live Lounge 2016

== Music videos ==
List of music videos, showing year released and director
Title	Year	Director(s)
"You Are Not Alone" (as part of The X Factor finalists 2009)	2009	
"Please Don't Let Me Go"	2010	Diamond Dogs
"Thinking of Me"	2010	Dave Mould
"Heart on My Sleeve"	2011	Sean De Sparengo
"Busy"	2011	Corin Hardy
"Heart Skips a Beat" (featuring Rizzle Kicks)	2011	Corin Hardy
"Dance with Me Tonight"	2011	Marcus Lundin
"Oh My Goodness"	2012	Marcus Lundin
"Heart Skips a Beat" (US version) (featuring Chiddy Bang)	2012	Declan Whitebloom
"Heart Skips a Beat" (US version) (featuring Chiddy Bang)	2012	Daniel Cloud Campos
"Troublemaker" (featuring Flo Rida)	2012	Michael Baldwin
"Army of Two"	2013	Vaughan Arnell
"Dear Darlin"	2013	Carly Cussen
"Right Place Right Time"	2013	Dominic O'Riordan; Warren Smith
"Inner Ninja"	2013	
"Hand on Heart"	2013	Vaughan Arnell
"Wrapped Up" (featuring Travie McCoy)	2014	Jonathan Lia
"Up"	2014	Ben and Gabe Turner
"Do They Know It's Christmas?" (as part of Band Aid 30)	2014	
"Look at the Sky"	2015	Yuichiro Sato
"Seasons"	2015	Ben Turner
"Beautiful to Me"	2015	Martyn Thomas
"Kiss Me"	2015	Gabe Turner
"Stevie Knows"	2015	Frank Borin
"You Don't Know Love"	2016	Charles Mehling
"Grow Up"	2016	Jim Canty
"Years & Years"	2016	Charles Mehling
"Unpredictable" (with Louisa Johnson)	2017	Marc Klasfeld
"Moves" (featuring Snoop Dogg)	2018	
"Excuses"	2019	N/A
"Save Me"	2025	Nick Suchak
"Run This Town"	2025	N/A
