= Hold Back My Heart =

Studio album by Michael Johns
- Released: June 23, 2009
- Recorded: 2008
- Genre: Pop rock Soul
- Length: 43:33
- Label: Downtown Records (distributed)

Professional ratings
Review scores
Source	Rating
AllMusic	3.5/5 stars

Hold Back My Heart is the third studio album by 2008 American Idol contestant Michael Johns. It sold a total of 20,000 copies.

== Track listing ==
1. "Heart on My Sleeve"(James Morrison) -3:41
2. "To Love Somebody" (Barry Gibb, Robin Gibb) -3:16
3. "Feeling Alright" -2:58
4. "Little Bear" -2:58
5. "Fools Gold" -5:52
6. "Mountains" -3:49
7. "Fire" -2:35
8. "Hold Back My Heart" -4:48
9. "This Is Goodbye" -4:55
10. "It's Too Late" -3:41
11. "Heart Is Weak" -4:10 (Diane Warren)
12. "Turn To You" -3:30

== Personnel ==
- Michael Johns- lead vocals
- Dave Cobb- bass guitar, acoustic guitar, electric guitar
- Sharlotte Gibson- background vocals
- Dorian Holley- background vocals
- Fred Mandel- keyboards
- Chris Powell- drums
- Alex Smith- background vocals
- Texicali Horns- horns
- Julia Waters- background vocals
- Maxine Williard Waters- background vocals
