= Busy (Olly Murs song) =

Single by Olly Murs

from the album Olly Murs
- B-side: "Takes a Lot"
- Released: 27 May 2011
- Recorded: 2010
- Genre: Pop
- Length: 2:59
- Label: Epic; Syco
- Songwriters: Olly Murs; Adam Argyle; Martin Brammer
- Producers: Adam Argyle; Martin Brammer

Olly Murs singles chronology
"Heart on My Sleeve" (2011)	"Busy" (2011)	"Heart Skips a Beat" (2011)

"Busy" is a pop song performed by British singer-songwriter Olly Murs, taken from his debut studio album, Olly Murs. It was written by Murs, Adam Argyle, Martin Brammer, and was released as the fourth and final single from the album on 27 May 2011. It was his second single to not be accompanied by a physical CD single. The song was also Murs' first single release to fail to reach the UK Top 40.

== Background ==
The song was co-written by Murs, along with Adam Argyle and Martin Brammer, for his debut album, Olly Murs. The single was released featuring two B-sides, new song "Takes a Lot", and an acoustic version of "Please Don't Let Me Go". The song instrumental was used as a backing track for Marks & Spencer food adverts from the year of release to May 2013 and as the theme tune to the BBC One sitcom Me and Mrs Jones.

The single's release fell right in the middle of Murs' first ever theatre tour, so promotion, as with his previous release, was limited. The song was performed at Radio 1's Big Weekend in Carlisle on 15 May 2011, on Paul O'Grady Live on 27 May 2011, and on This Morning on 2 'June 2011.

== Critical reception ==
David Griffiths from 4Music described "Busy" as "another slice of breezy, feel-good pop".

== Music video ==
The music video for "Busy" was uploaded onto Murs's Vevo account on 6 April 2011 and was directed by Corin Hardy, who has previously shot videos for Keane and McFly, and takes its inspiration from the independent film Lars and the Real Girl, as well as a number of other American independent films. Hardy wanted a "sweet and colourful" video to accompany the "catchy" song, and to "bend the rules" of the usual pop video. It features Murs playing an eccentric character dressed in 1970s clothing, who creates a life-size girlfriend (his "perfect girl") named Rose out of papier-mâché, then spends time with her, such as reading books, playing a guitar and going for a drive, and eventually falls in love with her. At the end of the video, Rose becomes a real person. The video stars Brazilian student and actress Patricia Duarte as Murs' girlfriend. David Renshaw from PopDash called the video "slightly creepy but fun".

== Track listing ==
Digital download
No.	Title	Writer(s)	Length
1.	"Busy"	Olly Murs, Adam Argyle, Martin Brammer	2:59
2.	"Takes A Lot"	Olly Murs, Phil Thornalley, John Green	3:00
3.	"Please Don't Let Me Go" (Acoustic)	Olly Murs, Claude Kelly, Steve Robson	3:21
4.	"Busy" (Video)		2:58

== Charts ==
Chart (2011)	Peak position
UK Singles (The Official Charts Company)	45

== Release history ==
Country	Date	Format
United Kingdom	27 May 2011	Digital download
