= Heart on My Sleeve (Michael Johns song) =

2009 single by Michael Johns

Single by Michael Johns

from the album Hold Back My Heart
- Released: 14 April 2009
- Recorded: 2008
- Genre: Pop
- Length: 3:41
- Label: TRP; Downtown
- Songwriters: James Morrison; John Shanks

"Heart on My Sleeve" is a pop song written by James Morrison and John Shanks. It was first released by American Idol season 7 contestant Michael Johns from his post-Idol album, Hold Back My Heart. The single was released on iTunes, on 14 April 2009. The song was later recorded by Olly Murs and released on 6 March 2011 as his third single from his debut album Olly Murs.

== Charts ==
The song was released as the lead single from the album Hold Back My Heart. It sold 5,000 copies in two weeks.

Chart (2009)	Peak position
U.S. Billboard Hot Adult Contemporary Tracks	22

== Olly Murs version ==
"Heart on My Sleeve"

Single by Olly Murs

from the album Olly Murs
- B-side: "C'Mon C'Mon"
- Released: 4 March 2011
- Recorded: 2010
- Genre: Pop
- Length: 3:27
- Label: Epic; Syco
- Songwriters: James Morrison; John Shanks
- Producer: John Shanks

Olly Murs singles chronology
"Thinking of Me" (2010)	"Heart on My Sleeve" (2011)	"Busy" (2011)

"Heart on My Sleeve" was then recorded by The X Factor runner-up, Olly Murs, for his eponymous debut album. It was released on 6 March 2011, as the third single from the album. It became his first single release not to be accompanied by a physical CD single. It also became his first single not to hit the UK top 10, only peaking at #20, but it performed very well on the radio airplay chart. To date, "Heart on My Sleeve" has sold over 63,500 copies.

=== Music video ===
A music video for the song was shot in December 2010 and uploaded to YouTube on 16 January 2011. It features Murs in a hotel room, performing the track whilst looking out onto the London skyline, before leaving the hotel room and heading out into London at night, walking along the South Bank and travelling in a black cab before appearing on the Millennium Bridge where he and a female figure meet and embrace tenderly at the video's end. In an interview for 4Music in November 2012, Murs admitted that it was his least favourite video to shoot as it was a night shoot and it was raining when it was filmed.

=== Promotion ===
Promotion for the single was limited, as Murs had just returned from completing a charity trek for Comic Relief in the Kaisut desert in Kenya around the time of its release. However, he did perform the track on This Morning, Daybreak and The Alan Titchmarsh Show. He also performed the track along with "Please Don't Let Me Go" at the final of the third season of The All Ireland Talent Show.

=== Track listing ===
Digital download
No.	Title	Writer(s)	Length
1.	"Heart on My Sleeve"	John Shanks, James Morrison	3:28
2.	"C'mon C'mon"	Olly Murs, Mads Hauge	3:35

=== Charts ===
Chart (2011)	Peak position
Scotland Singles (OCC)	24
UK Singles (OCC)	20

=== Release history ===
Region	Date	Format	Label
United Kingdom	4 March 2011	Digital download	Epic, Syco
