= Never Been Better =

2014 studio album by Olly Murs

Studio album by Olly Murs
- Released: 21 November 2014
- Recorded: 2014
- Genre: Pop
- Length: 47:12
- Labels: Syco; Epic
- Producers: Jason Evigan; Steve Robson; Martin Johnson; Peter Wallevik; Daniel Davidsen; Cutfather; Ryan Tedder; TMS; Steve Mac; Paul Weller; Jamie Scott; Matt Prime; Future Cut

Olly Murs chronology
Right Place Right Time (2012)	Never Been Better (2014)	24 Hrs (2016)

Singles from Never Been Better
- 1. "Wrapped Up" Released: 16 November 2014; 2. "Up" Released: 1 December 2014; 3. "Seasons" Released: 27 March 2015; 4. "Beautiful to Me" Released: 28 May 2015

Never Been Better is the fourth studio album by English recording artist Olly Murs. It was released through Epic Records on 21 November 2014 in Ireland and 24 November in the United Kingdom.

Never Been Better peaked at number one on the UK Albums Chart making it his third consecutive number one album on the chart. The album has been certified platinum by the British Phonographic Industry. The album reached the top-ten in Ireland, the top-twenty in Switzerland, and top-forty positions in Australia, Austria, Denmark, Finland, Germany and Norway. Never Been Better received generally mixed reviews from music critics, some praising Murs' more serious tone, while others felt that the album was unspectacular and safe.

On 2 October 2015, Murs announced on his Twitter account that he would release a special edition of Never Been Better on 20 November 2015 and the first single would be called "Kiss Me". Like Right Place Right Time: Special Edition, this album will feature extra tracks and a tour DVD.

== Background ==
In July 2013, Murs revealed that he had been back in the studio writing and recording new material for his fourth album, due to be released in Summer 2014. In February 2014, it was revealed that work had begun on his fourth studio album. He has been working with Wayne Hector, Claude Kelly, Steve Robson and Demi Lovato. On 28 September, Murs announced that the title of the album will be called Never Been Better and also announced the track list alongside it. The album was released on 24 November 2014.

== Singles ==
"Wrapped Up" was released as the lead single from the album on 16 November 2014. The song peaked at #3 on the UK Singles Chart, which earned Murs another top five single.

"Up", which features vocals from Demi Lovato was released as the second single from the album on 1 December 2014. The single peaked at #4 on the UK Singles Chart and has since gone Platinum in the United Kingdom.

"Seasons" was released as the third single on 27 March 2015. The single made it to the top 40 of the UK Singles Chart.

"Beautiful to Me" was released as fourth single on 28 May 2015. The song peaked at number 93 in the UK Singles Chart.

"Kiss Me" was released as the first single from the reissued special edition of the album on 9 October 2015.

"Stevie Knows" was released as the promotional single on 11 December 2015 from the album reissued special edition.

== Critical reception ==
Professional ratings
Review scores
Source	Rating
AllMusic	3.5/5 stars
Digital Spy	3/5 stars
The Guardian	3/5 stars
The Telegraph	2/5 stars

Reviews for Never Been Better were mixed. Writing for 4music.com, Jessica Lever gave the album a 4/5 score, while writing for The Telegraph, in a 2 out of 5 stars review, Neil McCormick wrote: "Unexpected collaborations only expose how ordinary the X Factor runner-up is." Dave Simpson of The Guardian was more charitable, and in a 3 of 5 stars review suggested "the acoustic ballad Let Me In (co-written with Paul Weller) is, by some distance, the best thing here." Less complimentary overall was Shaun Connors in Trucking's regular music reviews, writing (in a 1 of 5 stars review), "Yet another album by yet another X-Factor also-ran... And one that came second to the most forgettable winner of all... I realise it's risking social ostracisation by anybody under 13 for expressing these views, but this is without doubt the most uninspired, tedious collective of pop pap I've heard all year".

== Commercial performance ==
Never Been Better debuted at number one on the UK Albums Chart, selling 92,597 copies in its first week. It is Murs's third number one album after In Case You Didn't Know in 2011 and Right Place Right Time in 2012. As of March 2015, the album sold 886,000 copies.

== Track listing ==
Never Been Better – Standard version
No.	Title	Writer(s)	Producer(s)	Length
1.	"Did You Miss Me?"	Olly Murs; Jason Evigan; Sean Douglas	Evigan; Dan Book^{[a]}^{[b]}	3:16
2.	"Wrapped Up" (featuring Travie McCoy)	Murs; Travie McCoy; Steve Robson; Claude Kelly	Robson	3:05
3.	"Beautiful to Me"	Murs; Martin Johnson; Robson; Sam Hollander	Johnson; Kyle Moorman^{[a]}; Brandon Paddock^{[a]}	4:05
4.	"Up" (featuring Demi Lovato)	Wayne Hector; Daniel Davidsen; Maegan Cottone; Peter Wallevik; Mich Hansen	Davidsen; Wallevik; Cutfather; David Quiñones^{[c]}; TommyD^{[c]}	3:44
5.	"Seasons"	Ryan Tedder; Ammar Malik; Noel Zancanella	Tedder; Zancanella	3:37
6.	"Nothing Without You"	Murs; Thomas Barnes; Peter Kelleher; Benjamin Kohn; Iain James; Mike Posner	TMS	3:34
7.	"Never Been Better"	Murs; Barnes; Kelleher; Kohn; Hector	TMS	4:16
8.	"Hope You Got What You Came For"	Murs; Robson; Hector	Robson	3:25
9.	"Why Do I Love You"	Murs; Barnes; Kelleher; Kohn; Jamie Scott	TMS	3:42
10.	"Stick with Me"	Steve Mac; Hector; John Newman	Mac	3:37
11.	"Can't Say No"	Murs; Robson; Kelly	Robson; Future Cut^{[a]}	3:10
12.	"Tomorrow"	Murs; Robson; Hector	Robson	3:38
13.	"Let Me In"	Murs; Paul Weller	Weller	4:03
Total length:				47:12

Never Been Better – deluxe version
No.	Title	Writer(s)	Producer(s)	Length
14.	"We Still Love"	Murs; Robson; Sam Romans	Robson	3:15
15.	"Us Against the World"	Murs; Scott; Toby Smith	Scott; Smith; Matt Rad	3:27
16.	"Ready for Love"	Murs; Scott; Matt Prime; Phil Cook	Prime	3:26
17.	"History"	Murs; Robson; Kelly	Robson	2:50
Total length:				60:10

Never Been Better – Mediamarkt bonus tracks
No.	Title	Writer(s)	Producer(s)	Length
18.	"Alone Tonight"	Murs; Iyiola Babalola; Darren Lewis; Hector		3:28
19.	"Wrapped Up" (featuring Travie McCoy; Westfunk radio mix)	Murs; McCoy; Robson; Kelly	Robson	3:14
Total length:				66:52

Never Been Better – Japan bonus tracks
No.	Title	Writer(s)	Producer(s)	Length
18.	"Alone Tonight"	Murs; Iyiola Babalola; Darren Lewis; Hector	Future Cut	3:28
19.	"Wrapped Up" (featuring Travie McCoy; Westfunk radio mix)	Murs; McCoy; Robson; Kelly	Robson	3:37
20.	"Wrapped Up" (featuring Travie McCoy; Cahill radio mix)	Murs; McCoy; Robson; Kelly	Robson	3:14
21.	"Look at the Sky"	Hachidai Nakamura	Robson	3:27

Never Been Better – U.S. standard version
No.	Title	Length
1.	"Did You Miss Me?"	3:16
2.	"Wrapped Up" (featuring Travie McCoy)	3:05
3.	"Beautiful to Me"	4:05
4.	"Up" (featuring Demi Lovato)	3:44
5.	"Seasons"	3:37
6.	"Nothing Without You"	3:34
7.	"Never Been Better"	4:16
8.	"Hope You Got What You Came For"	3:25
9.	"Stick With Me"	3:37
10.	"Tomorrow"	3:38
11.	"Let Me In"	4:03
Total length:		40:20

Never Been Better – U.S. deluxe version
No.	Title	Length
12.	"Why Do I Love You"	3:42
13.	"Ready for Love"	3:26
14.	"History"	2:50
Total length:		50:18

=== Notes ===
- ^{^[a]} signifies an additional producer
- ^{^[b]} signifies a vocal producer
- ^{^[c]} signifies Demi Lovato vocal producer
- ^{^[d]} signifies strings producer

=== Unwrapped EP ===
Unwrapped is a free live EP exclusive to Google Play. It was released on 12 December 2014.

No.	Title	Writer(s)	Producer(s)	Length
1.	"Wrapped Up" (Live)	Murs; Robson; Kelly; McCoy	Robson	2:00
2.	"History" (Live)	Murs; Robson; Kelly	Robson	2:20
3.	"Dear Darlin'" (Live)	Murs; Ed Drewett; Jim Eliot	Drewett; Eliot	2:39
4.	"Troublemaker" (Live)	Murs; Robson; Kelly; Tramar Dillard	Robson	3:00
5.	"I Wish It Could Be Christmas Everyday" (Live)	Roy Wood	Wood	3:20
Total length:				13:19

== Personnel ==
Credits for the album adapted from AllMusic.

- Vern Asbury – bass
- John August – assistant engineer, background vocals
- Simon Baggs – violin
- Tom Barnes – drums, background vocals
- Paulette Bayley – violin
- Mark Berrow – violin
- Chris Bishop – vocal engineer
- Duck Blackwell – drum programming
- Rachel Bolt – viola
- Natalia Bonner – violin
- Dan Book – vocal producer
- John Bradbury – violin
- Sarah Brandwood-spencer – violin
- Karl Brazil – drums
- Chris Briggs – A&R
- Ian Burdge – celli
- Gillon Cameron – violin
- Paul Cassidy – viola
- Emil Chakalov – violin
- Simon Clarke – brass arrangement, alto saxophone, baritone saxophone
- Ben Collier – programming, string programming
- Maegan Cottone – background vocals
- Tom Coyne – mastering
- Cutfather – producer
- Rosie Danvers – cello, string arrangements
- Daniel Davidsen – bass, drum programming, guitar, instrumentation, producer, programming
- Alison Dods – violin
- Ian Dowling – engineer
- Jason Elliott – vocal engineer
- Jason Evigan – engineer, horn arrangements, instrumentation, producer, programming, vocal producer
- Fresh – beat box
- Futurecut – additional production
- Simon Gardner – brass, trumpet
- Paul Gendler – guitar
- Serban Ghenea – mixing
- Susie Gillis – string contractor
- Isobel Griffiths – string contractor
- John Hanes – mixing
- Mich Hansen – percussion
- Peter Hanson – violin
- Jacqueline Hartley – violin
- Wayne Hector – background vocals
- John Heley – celli
- Richard Henry – trombone
- George Hogg – trumpet
- Kiris Houston – bass, guitar, organ, piano
- Sally Jackson – violin
- Bryony James – cello
- Iain James – background vocals
- Martin Johnson – engineer, guitars, instrumentation, percussion, piano, producer, programming, background vocals
- Magnus Johnston – violin
- Beverley Jones – double bass
- Joe Kearns – engineer, vocal engineer
- Paul Kegg – celli
- Pete Kelleher – keyboards
- Claude Kelly – background vocals
- The Kick Horns – brass
- Patrick Kiernan – strings, violin
- Ben Kohn – guitar, percussion, background vocals
- Boguslaw Kostecki – violin
- Jan "Stan" Kybert – engineer
- Peter Lale – viola
- Oliver Langford – violin
- Chris Laws – drums, engineer, mixing
- Julian Leaper – violin
- Fiona Legget – viola
- Anthony Lewis – celli
- Vicki Lewis – string contractor
- David Liddell – trombone
- Ryan Lipman – mixing assistant
- Demi Lovato – featured artist
- Martin Loveday – celli
- Jacob Luttrell – background vocals
- Steve Mac – brass arrangement, keyboards, producer, string arrangements
- Wil Malone – string arrangements, string conductor
- Travie McCoy – featured artist
- Jim McLeod – violin
- Sam Miller – engineer
- Perry Montague-Mason – leader, strings, violin
- Kyle Moorman – additional production, engineer, programming
- Steve Morris – violin
- Olly Murs – primary artist, lead vocals
- Everton Nelson – violin
- John Newman – background vocals
- Serge Nudel – engineer
- Emma Owens – viola
- Brandon Paddock – additional production, bass, engineer, programming, background vocals
- Kerenza Peacock – violin
- Daniel Pierce – background vocals
- Mike Posner – piano
- Luke Potashnick – guitar
- Dann Pursey – engineer, mixing assistant, percussion
- David "DQ" Quinones – vocal producer
- Charles Rees – engineer
- Jonathan Rees – violin
- Tom Rees-roberts – Brass
- Alex Reeve – guitar
- Rich Rich III – assistant engineer, vocal editing
- Pierre-Luc Rioux – Guitar
- Steve Robson – instrumentation, mixing, producer, string arrangements
- Jenny Sacha – violin
- Tim Sanders – brass arrangement, tenor saxophone
- Frank Schaefer – celli
- Jamie Scott – piano
- Mary Scully – bass, double bass
- Nick Seeley – horn arrangements, strings
- Jackie Shave – violin
- Emlyn Singleton – violin
- Chris Stereo:Type – vocal engineer
- Nick Taylor – engineer
- Ryan Tedder – instrumentation, producer, programming, vocal engineer, background vocals
- Issaiah Tejada – assistant engineer
- TMS – producer
- Christopher Tombling – violin
- Tommy D. – producer
- Matthew Tryba – assistant engineer
- Nick Trygstad – cello
- Yu Tsai – photography
- Simon Turner – cello
- David Venni – photography
- Peter Wallevik – drum programming, instrumentation, keyboards, piano, producer, programming, background vocals
- Allen Walley – bass, double bass
- Leah Weller – background vocals
- Paul Weller – guitar, piano, producer, background vocals
- Jeremy Wheatley – mixing
- Bruce White – viola
- Pete Whitfield – transcription, violin
- Deborah Widdup – violin
- Josh Wilkinson – programming
- The Wired Strings – strings
- David Woodcock – violin
- Chris Worsey – celli
- Steve Wright – viola
- Noel Zancanella – instrumentation, producer, programming
- Joe Zook – mixing

== Charts and certifications ==
=== Weekly charts ===
Chart (2014)	Peak position
Australian Albums (ARIA)	27
Austrian Albums (Ö3 Austria)	40
Belgian Albums (Ultratop Flanders)	157
Danish Albums (Hitlisten)	38
Finnish Albums (Suomen virallinen lista)	28
German Albums (Offizielle Top 100)	38
Irish Albums (IRMA)	7
Norwegian Albums (VG-lista)	31
Scottish Albums (Official Charts)	1
Swedish Albums (Sverigetopplistan)	50
Swiss Albums (Schweizer Hitparade)	20
UK Albums (Official Charts)	1
US Billboard 200	42

=== Year-end charts ===
Chart (2014)	Position
UK Albums (OCC)	8
Chart (2015)	Position
UK Albums (OCC)	13

=== Decade-end charts ===
Chart (2010–2019)	Position
UK Albums (OCC)	65

=== Certifications ===
Region	Certification	Certified units/sales
United Kingdom (BPI)	3× Platinum	886,000

== Never Been Better: Special Edition ==
Never Been Better: Special Edition

Studio album (reissue) by Olly Murs
- Released: 20 November 2015
- Recorded: 2014–15
- Genre: Pop
- Length: 71:35
- Labels: Syco; Epic
- Producers: Jason Evigan; Steve Robson; Martin Johnson; Peter Wallevik; Daniel Davidsen; Cutfather; Ryan Tedder; TMS; Steve Mac; Paul Weller; Jamie Scott; Matt Prime; Future Cut

Olly Murs chronology
Never Been Better (2014)	Never Been Better: Special Edition (2015)	24 Hrs (2016)

Singles from Never Been Better: Special Edition
- 1. "Kiss Me" Released: 9 October 2015

Never Been Better: (Special Edition) is a reissue of the album. It was released on 20 November 2015, through Epic Records and Syco Music. Never Been Better (Special Edition) features seven new tracks and a DVD, Olly Murs: Never Been Better Tour.

=== Track listing ===
Never Been Better (Special Edition) — Standard version
No.	Title	Writer(s)	Producer(s)	Length
1.	"Did You Miss Me?"	Olly Murs; Jason Evigan; Sean Douglas	Evigan; Dan Book^{[a]}^{[b]}	3:16
2.	"Wrapped Up" (featuring Travie McCoy)	Murs; Travie McCoy; Steve Robson; Claude Kelly	Robson	3:05
3.	"Beautiful to Me"	Murs; Martin Johnson; Robson; Sam Hollander	Johnson; Kyle Moorman^{[a]}; Brandon Paddock^{[a]}	4:05
4.	"Up" (featuring Demi Lovato)	Wayne Hector; Daniel Davidsen; Maegan Cottone; Peter Wallevik; Mich Hansen	Davidsen; Wallevik; Cutfather; David Quiñones^{[c]}; TommyD^{[c]}	3:44
5.	"Seasons"	Ryan Tedder; Ammar Malik; Noel Zancanella	Tedder; Zancanella	3:37
6.	"Nothing Without You"	Murs; Tom Barnes; Pete Kelleher; Ben Kohn; Iain James; Mike Posner	TMS	3:34
7.	"Never Been Better"	Murs; Barnes; Kelleher; Kohn; Hector	TMS	4:16
8.	"Hope You Got What You Came For"	Murs; Robson; Hector	Robson	3:25
9.	"Why Do I Love You"	Murs; Barnes; Kelleher; Kohn; Jamie Scott	TMS	3:42
10.	"Stick with Me"	Steve Mac; Hector; John Newman	Mac	3:37
11.	"Can't Say No"	Murs; Robson; Kelly	Robson; Future Cut^{[a]}	3:10
12.	"Tomorrow"	Murs; Robson; Hector	Robson	3:38
13.	"Let Me In"	Murs; Paul Weller	Weller	4:03
14.	"Kiss Me"	Murs; Zacharie Raymond; Yannick Rastogi; Robson; Gary Derussy; Lindy Robbins; Taio Cruz	Banx & Ranx; Robson^{[b]}	3:18
15.	"Stevie Knows"	Alexander Izquierdo; Ian Kirkpatrick; Sam Martin	Kirkpatrick	3:11
16.	"If I Stay"	Murs; Johnson; Sam Hollander	Johnson	3:49
17.	"Sacrifice"	Murs; Robson; Kelly	Robson	2:45
18.	"Love Shouldn't Be This Hard"	Murs; Toby Gad	Gad	3:40
19.	"Up" (featuring Ella Eyre) (Live Lounge)	Hector; Davidsen; Cottone; Wallevik; Hansen		3:44
20.	"Last Christmas" (Live Lounge)	George Michael		3:56
Total length:				71:35

Never Been Better: Special Edition – Never Been Better Tour DVD
No.	Title	Length
1.	"Intro"
2.	"Did You Miss Me?"
3.	"Right Place Right Time"
4.	"Why Do I Love You"
5.	"Hey You Beautiful"
6.	"Hand on Heart"
7.	"Never Been Better"
8.	"Seasons"
9.	"Thinking of Me"/"Busy"/"Please Don't Let Me Go" (Piano section)
10.	"Hope You Got What You Came For"
11.	"Heart Skips a Beat"
12.	"Up" (featuring Ella Eyre)
13.	"Dance with Me Tonight"
14.	"Let Me In"
15.	"Dear Darlin'"
16.	"Beautiful to Me"
17.	"Troublemaker" (featuring Robbie Williams)
18.	"Nothing Without You"
19.	"Wrapped Up"/"Treasure"
20.	"Wrapped Up" (Instrumental)
