= Olly Murs (album) =

Studio album by Olly Murs
- Released: 23 November 2010
- Length: 47:12
- Label: Syco; Epic
- Producer: Matt Prime; Future Cut; Steve Robson; Adam Argyle; Martin Brammer; Andy Green; Steve Fitzmaurice; John Shanks; Jerry Abbott; Grant Black; Paddy Byrne; The Invisible Men; Mark Taylor; Trevor Horn

Olly Murs chronology
Olly Murs (2010)	In Case You Didn't Know (2011)

Singles from Olly Murs
- 1. "Please Don't Let Me Go" Released: 27 August 2010; 2. "Thinking of Me" Released: 19 November 2010; 3. "Heart on My Sleeve" Released: 4 March 2011; 4. "Busy" Released: 27 May 2011

Olly Murs is the debut studio album by the English singer-songwriter Olly Murs. It was released on 23 November 2010 in the United Kingdom.

The album's lead single, "Please Don't Let Me Go", was released on 27 August 2010. The song debuted at number one on the UK Singles Chart. The second single from the album, "Thinking of Me", was released on 22 November 2010, and debuted at number four. The third single "Heart on My Sleeve" was released in March 2011 and peaked at number 20. The song was written by James Morrison and John Shanks. The fourth and final release from the album, "Busy" was released in May 2011 and peaked at number 44. In October 2011, nearly a year after the album's release, BBC Radio 1 listeners voted Olly Murs as "Album of the Year" in the annual Radio 1 Teen Awards.

== Background and production ==
The possibility of an album was first rumoured when Murs finished second place on the sixth series of ITV talent competition, The X Factor. In February 2010, it was announced that Murs had been signed to a 50/50-record deal between Epic Records and Syco Music. Murs has collaborated with John Shanks, Ed Sheeran, Eg White, Roy Stride, Trevor Horn, Wayne Hector, Matty Benbrook, Phil Thornalley, Martin Brammer, Preston, Mark Taylor and Chris Difford on the album. Professor Green was due to appear on the album, however, the duet fell through before recording was completed. "Heart on My Sleeve" is a cover of the song originally recorded by American Idol finalist Michael Johns. Murs performed "Thinking of Me" live on The X Factor on 21 November 2010.

== Tour ==
On 21 November 2010 a UK tour was announced for 2011 to promote the album.

Tour dates
Date	City	Country	Venue
11 February 2011	Bridgwater	United Kingdom	Junction 24
27 April 2011	Rhyl	United Kingdom	Pavilion Theatre
29 April 2011	Margate	United Kingdom	Winter Gardens
30 April 2011	Ipswich	United Kingdom	Regent Theatre
2 May 2011	Newcastle upon Tyne	United Kingdom	Newcastle City Hall
3 May 2011	Glasgow	United Kingdom	Clyde Auditorium
4 May 2011	Harrogate	United Kingdom	Harrogate International Centre
6 May 2011	Blackpool	United Kingdom	Opera House Theatre
7 May 2011	Manchester	United Kingdom	Manchester Apollo
8 May 2011	Liverpool	United Kingdom	Liverpool Empire Theatre
10 May 2011	Cambridge	United Kingdom	Cambridge Corn Exchange
11 May 2011	Birmingham	United Kingdom	Nottingham Royal Concert Hall
13 May 2011	Cardiff	United Kingdom	Cardiff International Arena
14 May 2011	Plymouth	United Kingdom	Plymouth Pavilions
15 May 2011	Birmingham	United Kingdom	National Indoor Arena
16 May 2011	Bristol	United Kingdom	Colston Hall
18 May 2011	Sheffield	United Kingdom	Sheffield City Hall
19 May 2011	Portsmouth	United Kingdom	Portsmouth Guildhall
21 May 2011	Brighton	United Kingdom	The Brighton Centre
22 May 2011	Southend	United Kingdom	Cliffs Pavilion
24 May 2011	London	United Kingdom	Hammersmith Apollo
25 May 2011	London	United Kingdom	Hammersmith Apollo
26 May 2011	London	United Kingdom	Hammersmith Apollo
28 May 2011	Manchester	United Kingdom	Manchester Apollo
29 May 2011	Sheffield	United Kingdom	Sheffield City Hall
30 May 2011	Glasgow	United Kingdom	Clyde Auditorium
31 May 2011	Dundee	United Kingdom	Caird Hall
2 June 2011	Dublin	Ireland	Vicar Street
3 June 2011	Belfast	United Kingdom	Waterfront Hall
5 June 2011	Southend	United Kingdom	Cliffs Pavilion
6 June 2011	Southend	United Kingdom	Cliffs Pavilion
7 June 2011	Southend	United Kingdom	Cliffs Pavilion
8 June 2011	Southend	United Kingdom	Cliffs Pavilion
10 June 2011	Hull	United Kingdom	KC Stadium
11 June 2011	Norwich	United Kingdom	Carrow Road
12 June 2011	Swansea	United Kingdom	Liberty Stadium
25 June 2011	Belfast	United Kingdom	Kings Hall
26 June 2011	Limerick	Ireland	Thomond Park
9 July 2011	Chelmsford	United Kingdom	Hylands Park
15 July 2011	Warwick	United Kingdom	Warwick Castle^{[B]}
14 August 2011	York	United Kingdom	Castle Howard

== Critical reception ==
Professional ratings
Review scores
Source	Rating
AllMusic	3.5/5 stars

Ruth Harrison of Female First gives the most positive review of the album, saying "Olly has actually engaged his brain, put pen to paper and written tracks that are true to himself and his sound...this album proves that Olly is an artist in his own right". A review by Fraser McAlpine on the BBC Music website gave a heading of 'X Factor runner-up reveals a debut almost as good as his taste in hats.' Hermione Hoby from The Guardian gave a negative review of Olly Murs, saying "the album chugs along with vacant cheer through a series of reggae-inflected songs that don't always make the most of Murs's soulful voice. Other than the slightly awkward stab at scat-singing on "Please Don't Let Me Go" [...] there's not much here to grab the attention."

== Commercial performance ==
The album entered the UK Albums Chart at number two on 5 December 2010, selling 108,000 copies in its first week. The album was kept off the top spot by the third week sales of Take That's Progress which sold over 174,000 copies. In the following three weeks the album sold upwards of 100,000 in each week, making it the fastest selling debut album of 2010 in the UK. On 8 April 2011, the album was certified two-times platinum by the British Phonographic Industry (BPI) for shipments of 600,000 copies in the UK. As of December 2014, the album had sold 815,971 copies in the UK. In Ireland, the album debuted at number eleven. It has since been certified gold by the Irish Recorded Music Association (IRMA) for shipments of 7,500 copies.

== Track listing ==
Olly Murs track listing
No.	Title	Writer(s)	Producer(s)	Length
1.	"Change Is Gonna Come"	Olly Murs; Matt Prime; Blair MacKichan	Prime	3:46
2.	"Please Don't Let Me Go"	Murs; Claude Kelly; Steve Robson	Future Cut; Robson; Darren Lewis^{[a]}	3:24
3.	"Thinking of Me"	Murs; Robson; Wayne Hector	Future Cut; Robson	3:26
4.	"Busy"	Murs; Adam Argyle; Martin Brammer	Argyle; Brammer	3:00
5.	"I Blame Hollywood"	Argyle; Brammer	Argyle; Brammer	3:09
6.	"Ask Me to Stay"	Murs; Chris Braide; Chris Difford	Andy Green; Steve Fitzmaurice^{[a]}	3:35
7.	"Heart on My Sleeve"	John Shanks; James Morrison	Shanks	3:29
8.	"Hold On"	Murs; Jerry Abbott; Grant Black; Julian Velard; Paul Williams	Abbott; Grant Black	3:05
9.	"Accidental"	Murs; Paddy Byrne	Byrne	3:22
10.	"Love Shine Down" (featuring Jessie J)	Murs; Jason Pebworth; George Astasio; Jon Shave; Ed Sheeran; Dan Smith	The Invisible Men	4:07
11.	"Don't Say Goodbye"	Murs; Mark Taylor; Samuel Preston	Taylor	3:36
12.	"A Million More Years"	Lol Creme; Matt Schwartz	Trevor Horn	3:36
Total length:				47:12

iTunes Store deluxe edition bonus content
No.	Title	Length
13.	"Please Don't Let Me Go" (Music video)	3:34
14.	"Thinking of Me" (Music video)	3:25

Notes

- ^{^a} signifies an additional record producer

== Charts ==
=== Weekly charts ===
Weekly chart performance for Olly Murs
Chart (2010)	Peak position
Irish Albums (IRMA)	11
Scottish Albums (OCC)	3
UK Albums (OCC)	2

=== Year-end charts ===
2010 year-end chart performance for Olly Murs
Chart (2010)	Position
UK Albums (OCC)	20

2011 year-end chart performance for Olly Murs
Chart (2011)	Position
UK Albums (OCC)	47

2012 year-end chart performance for Olly Murs
Chart (2012)	Position
UK Albums (OCC)	129

=== Decade-end charts ===
Decade-end chart performance for Olly Murs
Chart (2010–2019)	Position
UK Albums (OCC)	72

== Certifications ==
Certifications for Olly Murs
Region	Certification	Certified units/sales
Ireland (IRMA)	Gold	7,500^{^}
United Kingdom (BPI)	2× Platinum	834,000
^{^} Shipments figures based on certification alone.

== Release history ==
Olly Murs release history
Region	Date	Format	Ref.
United Kingdom	29 November 2010	Digital download; CD	
