= Kiss Me (Olly Murs song) =

Single by Olly Murs

from the album Never Been Better: (Special Edition)
- Released: 9 October 2015
- Genre: Pop-funk
- Length: 3:18
- Label: Epic; Syco
- Songwriter(s): Taio Cruz; Olly Murs; Zacharie Raymond; Yannick Rastogi; Steve Robson; Gary Derussy; Lindy Robbins
- Producer(s): Banx & Ranx; Steve Robson

Olly Murs singles chronology
"Beautiful to Me" (2015)	"Kiss Me" (2015)	"Stevie Knows" (2015)

"Kiss Me" is a song recorded by English singer Olly Murs for Never Been Better: (Special Edition) (2015), the reissue of his fourth studio album, Never Been Better (2014). It was written by Taio Cruz, Murs, Zacharie Raymond, Yannick Rastogi, Steve Robson, Gary Derussy, Lindy Robbins, whilst the production was done by Banx & Ranx and Robson. It was digitally released on 9 October 2015, followed by a release of two remixes, an acoustic and a karaoke version of the song in a span of a month.

== Production and release ==
"Kiss Me" was written by Olly Murs, Zacharie Raymond, Yannick Rastogi, Steve Robson, Gary Derussy, Lindy Robbins and singer Taio Cruz, whilst the production was handled by Banx & Ranx (Raymond and Rastogi) and Robson. It was digitally released on 9 October 2015 as the first single from Never Been Better: Special Edition (2015), the reissue of his fourth studio album, Never Been Better (2014). A karaoke and an acoustic versions of the single were released via the iTunes Store on 30 October and 6 November respectively. Two remixes of "Kiss Me" were also launched; The Alias Club Mix was made available for download on 23 October, whilst the Aevion Tropical Mix was released on 13 November.

== Composition ==
"Kiss Me" is a song with a length of three minutes and eighteen seconds. Samantha Oneil of Renowned for Sound wrote that the song has a mid-tempo beat and a retro sound accompanied with "enticingly catchy lyrics". She described the composition of the single as a combination of Murs' "uplifting fast moving" past singles like "Troublemaker" and "Up" and "his emotionally powered ballads" like "Dear Darlin'". According to her, "The song manages to keep an authentic Olly Murs sound about it while also finding new ground." Idolator's Robbie Daw compared "Kiss Me" to the 2014 single by Nick Jonas, "Jealous".

== Music video ==
The music video to "Kiss Me" was released on 15 October 2015. The video features Murs sitting in a chair in a dark room with a woman dancing around him and lap dancing on him. The video also shows Murs and the woman going on various dates such as the cinema, going to a restaurant, having a picnic, going on a roller coaster, lying in a hammock by a beach, meeting the woman's parents and having a hot air balloon ride. At the end of the video, Murs and the woman are sitting in deckchairs eating ice cream where it appears that the woman is about to kiss Murs, only to playfully stick her ice cream in his face to which Murs does the same to her with his ice cream.

== Live performances ==
Murs has performed "Kiss Me" on the fourth live show of the twelfth series of The X Factor, Alan Carr: Chatty Man, Norwegian chat show Senkveld med Thomas og Harald, Sunday Brunch and the New Year's Eve special of TFI Friday.

== Track listing and formats ==
- Digital download
1. "Kiss Me" – 3:18
- Digital remix
1. "Kiss Me (The Alias Club Mix)" – 5:08
- Digital download
1. "Kiss Me (Karaoke Mix)" – 3:18
- Digital download
1. "Kiss Me (Acoustic Mix)" – 2:58
- Digital remix
1. "Kiss Me (Aevion Tropical Mix)" – 4:25

== Credits and personnel ==
Credits adapted from the liner notes of Never Been Better: Special Edition.

- Olly Murs — songwriting
- Steve Robson — songwriting, production
- Taio Cruz — songwriting
- Gary Derussy — songwriting, programming
- Lindy Robbins — songwriting
- Banx & Ranx — songwriting, production, engineering, programming
- Ike Schultz — additional engineering
- Peter Holz — additional engineering
- Tom Coyne — mastering
- Ash Howes — mixing

== Charts ==
Chart (2015)	Peak position
Belgium (Ultratip Bubbling Under Flanders)	43
Czech Republic (Rádio – Top 100)	64
Ireland (IRMA)	48
Scotland (OCC)	6
Sweden Heatseeker (Sverigetopplistan)	2
UK Singles (OCC)	11
US Twitter Top Tracks (Billboard)	38

== Certifications ==
Region	Certification	Certified units/sales
United Kingdom (BPI)	Platinum	600,000^{‡}
^{‡} Sales+streaming figures based on certification alone.

== Release history ==
Country	Date	Format	Label
Australia	9 October 2015	Digital download	Epic; Syco
Canada	9 October 2015	Digital download	Epic; Syco
Ireland	9 October 2015	Digital download	Epic; Syco
New Zealand	9 October 2015	Digital download	Epic; Syco
United Kingdom	9 October 2015	Digital download	Epic; Syco
United States	9 October 2015	Digital download	Epic; Syco
Australia	23 October 2015	Digital remix (The Alias Club Mix)	Epic; Syco
Canada	23 October 2015	Digital remix (The Alias Club Mix)	Epic; Syco
Ireland	23 October 2015	Digital remix (The Alias Club Mix)	Epic; Syco
New Zealand	23 October 2015	Digital remix (The Alias Club Mix)	Epic; Syco
United Kingdom	23 October 2015	Digital remix (The Alias Club Mix)	Epic; Syco
United States	23 October 2015	Digital remix (The Alias Club Mix)	Epic; Syco
Australia	30 October 2015	Digital download (Karaoke Mix)	Epic; Syco
Canada	30 October 2015	Digital download (Karaoke Mix)	Epic; Syco
Ireland	30 October 2015	Digital download (Karaoke Mix)	Epic; Syco
New Zealand	30 October 2015	Digital download (Karaoke Mix)	Epic; Syco
United Kingdom	30 October 2015	Digital download (Karaoke Mix)	Epic; Syco
United States	30 October 2015	Digital download (Karaoke Mix)	Epic; Syco
Australia	6 November 2015	Digital download (Acoustic Mix)	Epic; Syco
Canada	6 November 2015	Digital download (Acoustic Mix)	Epic; Syco
Ireland	6 November 2015	Digital download (Acoustic Mix)	Epic; Syco
New Zealand	6 November 2015	Digital download (Acoustic Mix)	Epic; Syco
United Kingdom	6 November 2015	Digital download (Acoustic Mix)	Epic; Syco
United States	6 November 2015	Digital download (Acoustic Mix)	Epic; Syco
Australia	13 November 2015	Digital remix (Aevion Tropical Mix)	Epic; Syco
Canada	13 November 2015	Digital remix (Aevion Tropical Mix)	Epic; Syco
Ireland	13 November 2015	Digital remix (Aevion Tropical Mix)	Epic; Syco
New Zealand	13 November 2015	Digital remix (Aevion Tropical Mix)	Epic; Syco
United Kingdom	13 November 2015	Digital remix (Aevion Tropical Mix)	Epic; Syco
United States	13 November 2015	Digital remix (Aevion Tropical Mix)	Epic; Syco
