= Wrapped Up =

Single by Olly Murs featuring Travie McCoy

from the album Never Been Better
- Released: 16 November 2014
- Recorded: 2014
- Genre: Disco; funk
- Length: 3:05
- Label: Epic; Syco
- Songwriters: Olly Murs; Travie McCoy; Steve Robson; Claude Kelly
- Producer: Steve Robson

Olly Murs singles chronology
"Hand on Heart" (2013)	"Wrapped Up" (2014)	"Up" (2014)

Travie McCoy singles chronology
"Keep On Keeping On" (2014)	"Wrapped Up" (2014)	"Golden" (2015)

"Wrapped Up" is a song by English singer-songwriter Olly Murs, released as the lead single from his fourth studio album, Never Been Better (2014). It features American rapper Travie McCoy. The song was released on 7 October 2014 in France and 16 November 2014 in the United Kingdom by Epic Records and Syco Music.

== Background ==
It was written by Murs, McCoy, Steve Robson and Claude Kelly, and it was produced by Robson. The song premiered on 7 October 2014, in the United Kingdom on Capital FM. On 23 October 2014, the song temporarily became available as an instant download upon pre-ordering Never Been Better, but was removed by iTunes in a matter of hours.

== Music video ==
The official music video was filmed in Los Angeles and was uploaded onto Murs's Vevo account on 28 October 2014. It shows Murs and several dancers on travelators. McCoy is not seen.

== Live performances ==
Olly performed the song on The X Factor Australia on 20 October, Sunrise on 21 October and The X Factor UK on 16 November. Olly also performed the song at BBC Radio 1's Big Weekend 2015 in Norwich, with Radio One DJ Nick Grimshaw performing the rap.

== Track listing ==
- Digital download
1. "Wrapped Up" (featuring Travie McCoy) – 3:05
- CD Single
1. "Wrapped Up" (featuring Travie McCoy) – 3:05
2. "Wrapped Up" (featuring Travie McCoy) [Cahill Radio Mix] — 3:36
- Digital EP
1. "Wrapped Up" (featuring Travie McCoy) – 3:05
2. "Wrapped Up" (Live for The Sun's Fabulous magazine) — 2:53
3. "Wrapped Up" (featuring Travie McCoy) [Cahill Radio Mix] — 3:36
4. "Wrapped Up" (featuring Travie McCoy) [Westfunk Radio Mix] — 3:12

== Charts ==
=== Weekly charts ===
Chart (2014–15)	Peak position
Australia (ARIA)	15
Austria (Ö3 Austria Top 40)	21
Belgium (Ultratip Bubbling Under Flanders)	3
Belgium (Ultratip Bubbling Under Wallonia)	5
Czech Republic Airplay (ČNS IFPI)	23
Czech Republic Singles Digital (ČNS IFPI)	9
Denmark (Tracklisten)	18
Finland (Suomen virallinen lista)	16
Germany (GfK)	11
Hungary (Editors' Choice Top 40)	22
Hungary (Stream Top 40)	19
Ireland (IRMA)	7
Japan Hot 100 (Billboard)	8
Japan Hot Overseas (Billboard)	1
Japan (Dance Hits Top 20)	1
Netherlands (Dutch Top 40)	17
Netherlands (Single Top 100)	22
Poland Airplay (ZPAV)	15
Romania (Airplay 100)	52
Scotland Singles (OCC)	2
Slovakia Airplay (ČNS IFPI)	23
Slovakia Singles Digital (ČNS IFPI)	16
Slovenia (SloTop50)	35
Spain (Promusicae)	18
Sweden (Sverigetopplistan)	21
Switzerland (Schweizer Hitparade)	18
UK Singles (OCC)	3
US Pop Airplay (Billboard)	40

=== Year-end charts ===
Chart (2014)	Position
UK Singles (Official Charts Company)	72
Chart (2015)	Position
Netherlands (Dutch Top 40)	99
Netherlands (NPO 3FM)	86

== Certifications ==
Region	Certification	Certified units/sales
Australia (ARIA)	Gold	35,000^{^}
Denmark (IFPI Danmark)	Gold	30,000^{^}
Germany (BVMI)	Gold	200,000^{‡}
Netherlands (NVPI)	Platinum	30,000^{‡}
New Zealand (RMNZ)	Gold	15,000^{‡}
Sweden (GLF)	Platinum	40,000^{‡}
United Kingdom (BPI)	Platinum	600,000^{‡}
^{^} Shipments figures based on certification alone.^{‡} Sales+streaming figures based on certification alone.

== Release history ==
Region	Date	Format	Label
France	7 October 2014	Digital download	Epic Records, Syco Music
United Kingdom	14 November 2014	Digital download	Epic Records, Syco Music
United States	27 January 2015	Contemporary hit radio	Syco Music / Columbia Records
United States	3 February 2015	Dance radio	Syco Music / Columbia Records
