= Seasons (Olly Murs song) =

Single by Olly Murs

from the album Never Been Better
- Released: 27 March 2015
- Recorded: 2014
- Genre: Pop
- Length: 3:39
- Label: Epic; Syco
- Songwriter(s): Ryan Tedder; Ammar Malik; Noel Zancanella
- Producer(s): Ryan Tedder; Noel Zancanella

Olly Murs singles chronology
"Up" (2014)	"Seasons" (2015)	"Beautiful to Me" (2015)

"Seasons" is the third single by English singer-songwriter Olly Murs from his fourth studio album Never Been Better (2014) and was released on 27 March 2015. The song was co-written and co-produced by OneRepublic frontman Ryan Tedder. Murs announced on his Twitter account that "Seasons" would be the third single from Never Been Better on 10 February 2015.

== Music video ==
The music video to "Seasons" was uploaded on Murs's Vevo account on 16 March 2015. The video features Murs trying to win back his girlfriend after she catches him in bed with another woman. She rejects his advances at first but at the end of the video, she and Murs get back together.

== Live performances ==
Murs has performed "Seasons" on the quarter-final of the fourth series of The Voice UK and on The Jonathan Ross Show. He also performed it on Sunday Night at the Palladium.

== Charts ==
Chart (2015)	Peak position
Ireland (IRMA)	58
Scotland (OCC)	18
UK Singles (OCC)	34
