= Beautiful to Me (Olly Murs song) =

Single by Olly Murs

from the album Never Been Better
- Released: 28 May 2015
- Genre: Pop
- Length: 4:05
- Label: Epic Records; Syco
- Songwriter(s): Olly Murs; Martin Johnson; Steve Robson; Sam Hollander
- Producer(s): Martin Johnson; Kyle Moorman; Brandon Paddock

Olly Murs singles chronology
"Seasons" (2015)	"Beautiful to Me" (2015)	"Kiss Me" (2015)

"Beautiful to Me" is a song performed by English singer-songwriter Olly Murs. It was released as a digital download on 28 May 2015 through Epic Records and Syco as the fourth single from his fourth studio album, Never Been Better (2014). It was written by Olly Murs, Martin Johnson, Steve Robson and Sam Hollander. The song peaked at number 93 on the UK Singles Chart, becoming Murs' lowest-charting single to date.

== Music video ==
A music video to accompany the release of "Beautiful to Me" was first released onto YouTube on 27 May 2015 at a total length of four minutes and two seconds. Due to tour commitments, Murs was unable to make a full appearance in the video and was only able to make a small cameo appearance.

The plot of the video is about two childhood friends who appear to have feelings for each other but can't admit it.

The video sees a teenage boy and girl sitting outside their headteacher's office where they smile and laugh to one another before the headteacher's door opens. The two friends are next seen outside their school smoking before running off. The next scene sees the two sitting next to each other on a bench during a school dance, where the boy is approached by another girl to be his dance partner. The boy is reluctant to do so, but is convinced by his friend to dance with the other girl.

The next scene takes place years later where the girl is in a club waiting for someone whilst Murs sings in the background. The girl gives up on waiting and leaves to visit the boy and they talk. As the boy makes tea, the girl gets a phone call (presumably from the person she was waiting for in the club) and leaves after saying goodbye to the boy.

The girl is next seen in a wedding shop and gazes at her wedding dress. Meanwhile, the boy is at home looking at an invitation to the girl's wedding and starts to think back to their earlier days. He tears up the invitation and leaves his house, only to see the girl in front of him wearing her wedding dress and smiles to him, having decided to be with the boy rather than her husband-to-be.

== Track listing ==
Digital download
No.	Title	Length
1.	"Beautiful to Me"	4:05

Digital download – Remixes
No.	Title	Length
1.	"Beautiful to Me" (JRMX Edit)	3:33
2.	"Beautiful to Me" (JRMX Club Mix)	5:26

== Chart performance ==
=== Weekly charts ===
Chart (2015)	Peak position
UK Singles (OCC)	93

== Release history ==
Region	Date	Format	Label
United Kingdom	28 May 2015	Digital download	Epic Records; Syco
