= Michael Johns (singer) =

Australian singer (1978–2014)

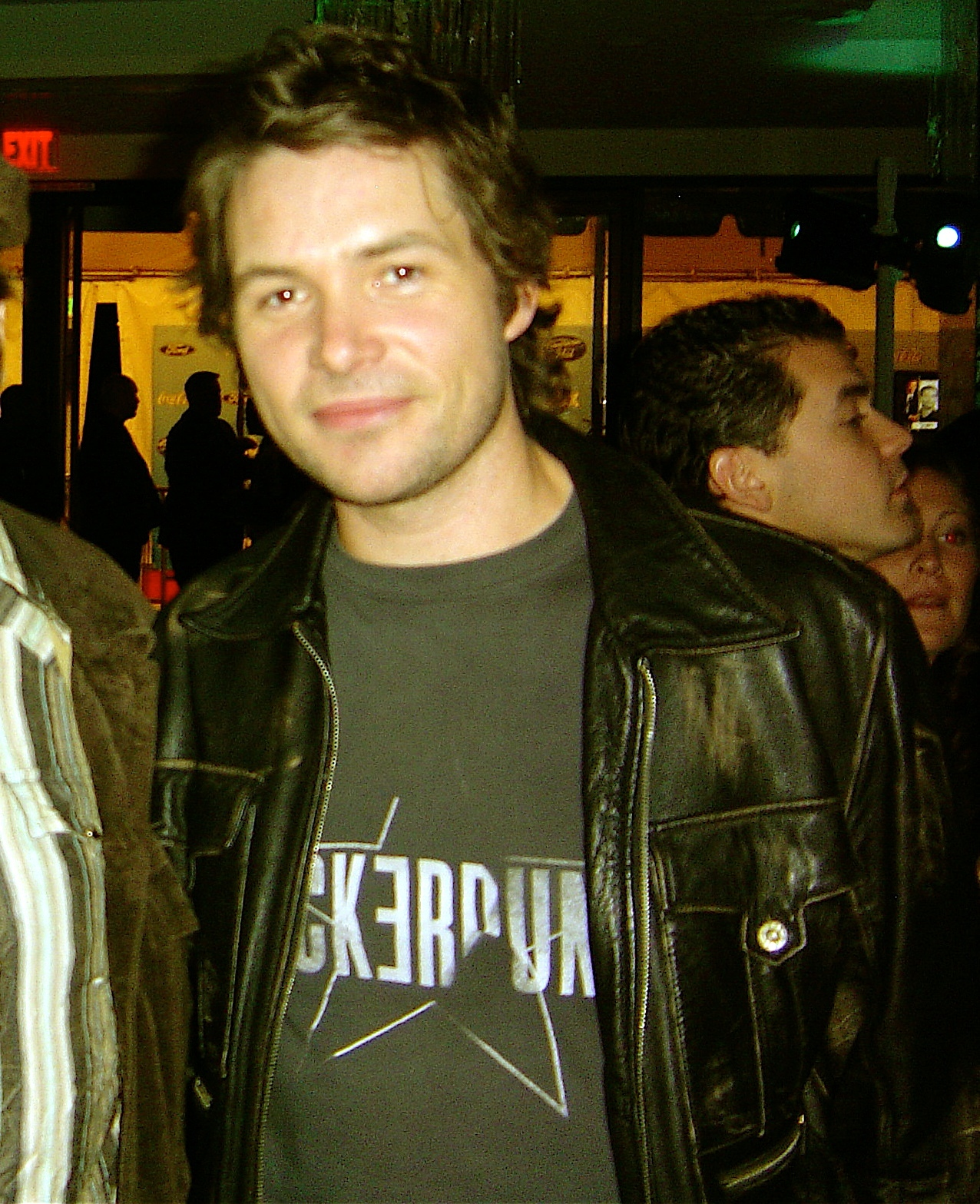
- Johns at the American Idol, Season 7, Top 12 party on 6 March 2008

Background information
- Born: Michael John Lee; 20 October 1978; Perth, Western Australia, Australia
- Died: 1 August 2014 (aged 35) Tustin, California, U.S.
- Genres: Pop; pop rock; soul; soft rock; rock
- Occupations: Singer; songwriter
- Instruments: Vocals; guitar
- Years active: 2000–2014
- Labels: Beverly Martel Music; Maverick; TRP Records; Downtown
- Formerly of: The Rising

Michael Johns (born Michael John Lee; 20 October 1978 – 1 August 2014) was an Australian singer who finished in eighth place on the seventh season of American Idol, in 2008. In 2009, he released a music album, Hold Back My Heart, which sold 20,000 copies. Johns died on 1 August 2014, at the age of 35 of dilated cardiomyopathy.

== Early life ==
John Lee was born in Perth, Western Australia on 20 October 1978. As a teenager, he appeared as The Coachman in Pinocchio at the Regal Theatre and was a choir singer in Anything Goes at His Majesty's Theatre. He attended Newman College in Perth. In 1997, John Lee moved to the United States on a tennis scholarship and majored in drama at Abraham Baldwin Agricultural College in Tifton, Georgia, before dropping out after two quarters. He also briefly played Australian rules football for the United States Australian Football League (USAFL) club Atlanta Kookaburras from 2001 to 2002.

== Career ==
=== Early career ===
John Lee moved from Tifton to Atlanta to pursue a music career, playing cover engagements. He then joined a band called Film for 18 months. After traveling to Los Angeles to showcase for a number of labels, he was signed to Maverick Records in 2002 as a solo artist under his birth name Michael Lee. He recorded an album, and then formed a rock band called The Rising. A song from the album "Cradle" received some airplay, and the album titled Future Unknown was released in 2003. It was also released on iTunes in 2008 after he appeared on American Idol. After Maverick, he was signed to Columbia, but was later dropped. He started using the name Michael Johns in 2006 as an homage to his stepfather whose name, like his middle name, is John, hence "Johns" because there are two of them in the family.

=== American Idol ===
==== Overview ====
He auditioned for the seventh season of American Idol at San Diego's Qualcomm Stadium in July 2007. He finished in eighth place in the competition.

==== Performances ====
Week #	Theme	Song choice	Original artist	Order #	Result
Top 24 (12 Men)	1960s	"Light My Fire"	The Doors	12	Safe
Top 20 (10 Men)	1970s	"Go Your Own Way"	Fleetwood Mac	1	Safe
Top 16 (8 Men)	1980s	"Don't You (Forget About Me)"	Simple Minds	5	Safe
Top 12	Lennon–McCartney	"Across the Universe"	The Beatles	10	Safe
Top 11	The Beatles	"A Day in the Life"	The Beatles	4	Safe
Top 10	Year They Were Born	"We Will Rock You"/"We Are the Champions"	Queen	6	Safe
Top 9	Dolly Parton	"It's All Wrong, But It's All Right"	Dolly Parton	9	Safe
Top 8	Inspirational Music	"Dream On"	Aerosmith	1	Eliminated

== Post-Idol ==
As one of the seventh season finalists, Johns joined the 2008 American Idol Live! tour after the show. While he was on the Idol tour, he worked on a soundtrack for Olympic snowboarder Shaun White's documentary DVD Don't Look Down. The soundtrack was released by Three Rings Projects on 20 January 2009. Johns sang on all but one of the vocal tracks. In December 2008, he released a song he wrote in 2006, "Another Christmas." Half the proceeds from the song were advertised as being donated to the Red Cross and half to fight amyotrophic lateral sclerosis.

In April 2009, he released "Heart on My Sleeve", the lead single from Hold Back My Heart. The song debuted on Billboard's Adult Contemporary chart at number 27. The album was released on 23 June 2009, and debuted at number 97 on the Billboard 200 with 5,000 copies sold. It sold 20,000 copies as of January 2010. In 2012, he released Love and Sex, a three-song EP. He also appeared briefly in a 2012 episode of The Real Housewives of Beverly Hills.

== Personal life ==
Lee married Stacey Vuduris, in 2007.

== Death ==
Michael John Lee, died in Tustin, California on August 1, 2014. On 18 November 2014, the coroner reported that Johns had died of dilated cardiomyopathy, which inhibited the flow of blood to his body and also caused his heart to enlarge. A fatty liver also contributed to his death.

Johns was the first American Idol finalist to die after he appeared on the show.

== Discography ==
=== Albums ===
Release date	Artist	Album	Label	Number of tracks
2001	Film	Rolling	Projector Records	6 tracks
16 September 2003	The Rising	Future Unknown	Maverick	11 tracks
26 August 2003	The Rising	Live at the Apple Store	Maverick	5 tracks (EP)
2007	Michael Johns	Michael Johns	-	12 tracks
2008	Michael Johns	Another Christmas	TRP records	1 track
2009	Michael Johns	Don't Look Down – The Height of Competition	TRP records	17 tracks

==== Downtown Records ====
Year	Album details	Peak		Sales
Year	Album details	US	US Indie	Sales
2009	Hold Back My Heart: Release date: 23 June 2009; Label: Downtown Records; Format: CD	97	12	US: 20,000
2012	Love & Sex (EP): Release date: 11 June 2012; Label: BUTR Records; Format: Digital Download	—	—	

=== Singles ===
Year	Title	Chart Positions	Album
Year	Title	US AC	Album
2009	"Heart on My Sleeve"	22	Hold Back My Heart
