= Thinking of Me =

2010 single by Olly Murs

Single by Olly Murs

from the album Olly Murs
- B-side: "Sophie"
- Released: 21 November 2010
- Recorded: 2010
- Genre: Pop; Ska
- Length: 3:26
- Label: Epic; Syco
- Songwriter(s): Olly Murs; Steve Robson; Wayne Hector
- Producer(s): Future Cut; Steve Robson

Olly Murs singles chronology
"Please Don't Let Me Go" (2010)	"Thinking of Me" (2010)	"Heart on My Sleeve" (2011)

"Thinking of Me" is a song by British singer Olly Murs, taken from his debut studio album, Olly Murs. It is written by Murs, Wayne Hector and Steve Robson, and was released as Murs's second single on 19 November 2010. Murs performed it live on The X Factor on 21 November 2010. It became his second UK top 5 hit after the chart topping success of his debut, "Please Don't Let Me Go".

== Background ==
In 2009 Murs was runner-up in the sixth series of singing competition The X Factor, following which he was offered a joint record deal with Epic Records and Syco Music in February 2010. Work then began on his debut album and "Thinking of Me" was written by Murs, Wayne Hector and Steve Robson. The single's B-Side, "Sophie", is a track written about one of Murs' ex-girlfriends, with whom he had a messy break-up. The song received its first airplay on BBC Radio 1 on 11 October 2010, following an interview with Murs on The Chris Moyles Show live from Darlington Civic Theatre.

== Music video ==
The video for the song premiered on 21 October 2010, following a snippet of the song being made available on Murs's YouTube account. The video features Murs sitting in an ice cream van, and begins to daydream where he gets out of the ice cream van and starts walking across bollards and tightrope walking along and walking down a bridge whilst imagining every woman who walks by him as an old girlfriend including the traffic warden who wakes him up asking him to move the van and the video ends with Murs driving away.

== Live performances ==
Murs' first ever live performance of the song on TV was on the day of the single's release, 21 November 2010, where he made his homecoming appearance on the results show of The X Factor. Accompanied by a troupe of dancers and a backdrop of street lamps and red phone boxes, the song's lyrics in the middle 8 were ad-libbed by Murs to reference Cheryl Cole, who was still a judge on the show at the time. Murs revealed in his 2012 autobiography Happy Days that the plan had initially been to make the performance "more Christmas-y" with it being so close to that time of year. Murs also performed the song on numerous other TV shows, including Loose Women, BBC Switch's The 5.19 Show, Live from Studio Five, KOKO Pop, Jason Manford's Comedy Rocks and The Alan Titchmarsh Show. In 2011, the song was also performed at Radio 1's Big Weekend in Carlisle on 15 May (with Murs being accompanied on stage by Chris Moyles and Comedy Dave from the breakfast show), T4 on the Beach on 10 July, The Hollyoaks Music Show on 22 August and Murs' special for The Album Chart Show on 4 December.

== Track listing ==
Digital download and CD single
No.	Title	Writer(s)	Length
1.	"Thinking of Me"	Olly Murs, Steve Robson, Wayne Hector	3:26
2.	"Sophie"	Olly Murs, James Bryan, George Astasio, Jason Pebworth, Jon Shave	2:55

== Charts ==
=== Weekly charts ===
Chart (2010)	Peak position
European Hot 100 Singles	16
Ireland (IRMA)	13
Scotland (OCC)	3
UK Singles (OCC)	4

=== Year-end charts ===
Chart (2010)	Position
UK Singles Chart	90
Chart (2011)	Position
UK Singles Chart	163

== Certifications ==
Region	Certification	Certified units/sales
United Kingdom (BPI)	Gold	400,000^{^}
^{^} Shipments figures based on certification alone.

== Release history ==
Country	Date	Format
Ireland	19 November 2010	Digital download
United Kingdom	21 November 2010	Digital download
United Kingdom	22 November 2010	CD single
