= Up (Olly Murs song) =

2014 single by Olly Murs

Single by Olly Murs featuring Demi Lovato

from the album Never Been Better
- Released: 1 December 2014
- Recorded: 2014
- Studio: Air Edel Studios (London)
- Genre: Pop folk
- Length: 3:44
- Label: Epic; Syco
- Songwriter(s): Wayne Hector; Daniel Davidsen; Maegan Cottone; Peter Wallevik; Mich Hansen
- Producer(s): Daniel Davidsen; Cutfather; Peter Wallevik

Olly Murs singles chronology
"Wrapped Up" (2014)	"Up" (2014)	"Seasons" (2015)

Demi Lovato singles chronology
"Really Don't Care" (2014)	"Up" (2014)	"Cool for the Summer" (2015)

Music video
- "Up" on YouTube

"Up" is a song by English singer Olly Murs, released on 1 December 2014 as the second single from his fourth studio album, Never Been Better (2014). It features American singer Demi Lovato and is also featured on the deluxe version of Lovato's fourth album, Demi. It was written and produced by Daniel Davidsen, Peter Wallevik and Cutfather, with additional writing from Wayne Hector, and Maegan Cottone.

"Up" has peaked at number four on the UK Singles Chart. It has also been certified Double Platinum in the UK for sales of over 1,200,000. It also reached the top ten in Austria, Ireland, New Zealand, Slovenia, and South Africa. It was the fourth-most-consumed song of 2015 in Slovenia. Murs performed this song at his 2015 Never Been Better Tour with support act Ella Eyre singing Lovato's lyrics.

A 27-second sample of "Up", where Murs sings the verse and Lovato sings the chorus.

== Background ==
The song was written and produced by Daniel Davidsen, Cutfather, and Peter Wallevik, and it was co-written by Wayne Hector and Maegan Cottone. According to Cutfather, the song is inspired by the music of Mumford & Sons and Phillip Phillips. "Up" was initially submitted to English-Irish boy band One Direction, but it was rejected by their label Syco Music. The song's chorus was then re-written by Maegan Cottone and then submitted to Olly Murs as a duet.

== Music videos ==
The music video was directed by Ben and Gabe Turner and released on Vevo on 11 December 2014. The video features Murs and Lovato standing in two rooms separated by a wall. They begin to wreck the rooms before Murs uses a guitar to break a hole into the wall and he and Lovato begin to remove most of the bricks in the wall and look upon each other. A black and white video of the song's acoustic version was released on 18 December 2014, where Murs and Lovato recording the song in a studio.

== Live performances ==
Murs and Lovato first performed the song live on the final of the eleventh series of The X Factor on 14 December 2014.

== Chart performance ==
"Up" debuted at number 120 on the UK Singles Chart for the week of 6 December 2014, and rose into the top 100 at number 94 in its second week. The following week it reached number 43, before reaching its peak of number 4. The song debuted in New Zealand at number 38. The single has so far sold 606,500 copies in the UK and is certified platinum. This is Demi Lovato's first platinum hit in the UK, let alone the first by any Hollywood Records artist, despite this being released by Epic. In addition, Up has so far reached number 14 on the ARIA Charts; thus becoming Lovato's second Australian top 20 hit. Worldwide, Up has currently sold over 1,000,000 copies.

== Track listing ==
- Digital EP
1. "Up" (live acoustic version) – 3:49
2. "Up" (Wideboys radio mix) – 3:41
3. "Up" (Max Sanna & Steve Pitron radio mix) – 3:43
4. "Dear Darlin'" (ITV live performance) – 3:59
- German CD single
1. "Up"
2. "Up" (live acoustic version)

== Charts ==
=== Weekly charts ===
Weekly chart performance for "Up"
Chart (2014–15)	Peak position
Australia (ARIA)	14
Austria (Ö3 Austria Top 40)	6
Belgium (Ultratip Bubbling Under Flanders)	15
CIS Airplay (TopHit)	176
Czech Republic (Rádio – Top 100)	22
Czech Republic (Singles Digitál Top 100)	44
Euro Digital Songs (Billboard)	4
Germany (GfK)	17
Hungary (Rádiós Top 40)	8
Hungary (Single Top 40)	18
Ireland (IRMA)	3
Italy (FIMI)	15
New Zealand (Recorded Music NZ)	9
Scotland (OCC)	3
Slovakia (Rádio Top 100)	29
Slovakia (Singles Digitál Top 100)	79
Slovenia (SloTop50)	3
South Africa (EMA)	5
Switzerland (Schweizer Hitparade)	28
UK Singles (OCC)	4
US Twitter Top Tracks (Billboard)	8

=== Year-end charts ===
Year-end chart performance for "Up"
Chart (2015)	Position
Australia (ARIA)	69
Austria (Ö3 Austria Top 40)	53
Germany (Official German Charts)	72
Hungary (Rádiós Top 40)	74
Hungary (Single Top 40)	88
Italy (FIMI)	82
New Zealand (Recorded Music NZ)	49
Slovenia (SloTop50)	4
UK Singles (Official Charts Company)	35

Chart (2016)	Position
Slovenia (SloTop50)	37

== Certifications ==
Certifications for "Up"
Region	Certification	Certified units/sales
Australia (ARIA)	2× Platinum	140,000^{‡}
Denmark (IFPI Danmark)	Gold	45,000^{‡}
Germany (BVMI)	Gold	200,000^{‡}
Italy (FIMI)	Platinum	50,000^{‡}
New Zealand (RMNZ)	2× Platinum	60,000^{‡}
United Kingdom (BPI)	2× Platinum	1,200,000^{‡}
^{‡} Sales+streaming figures based on certification alone.

== Release history ==
Release dates for "Up"
Country	Date	Format	Label	Ref.
United Kingdom	1 December 2014	Radio airplay	Epic Records; Syco Music	
Italy	19 December 2014	Radio airplay	Epic	
United Kingdom	4 January 2015	EP; Digital download	Epic; Syco	
Germany	13 March 2015	CD single	Epic; Syco	
