= Please Don't Let Me Go =

2010 single by Olly Murs

Single by Olly Murs

from the album Olly Murs
- B-side: "This One's for the Girls"
- Released: 27 August 2010
- Recorded: 2010
- Genre: Pop
- Length: 3:24
- Label: Epic; Syco
- Songwriters: Olly Murs; Claude Kelly; Steve Robson
- Producers: Future Cut; Steve Robson

Olly Murs singles chronology
"Please Don't Let Me Go" (2010)	"Thinking of Me" (2010)

"Please Don't Let Me Go" is a song by British singer Olly Murs. Written by Murs, Claude Kelly and Steve Robson, the song served as the lead single from the X Factor runner-up's eponymous debut album and it was his debut single. The song was released as a digital download in the United Kingdom on 29 August 2010, where it debuted at number-one on the singles chart; also peaking at number five in Ireland. The song was nominated at the 2011 BRIT Awards for Best British Single, but lost out to Tinie Tempah for his song "Pass Out".

== Background ==
In 2009, Murs was runner-up in the sixth series of singing competition The X Factor, following which he was offered a joint record deal with Epic Records and Syco Music in February 2010. Work then began on his debut album and, inspired by a demo scouted out by his A&R team of a reggae-influenced pop song called "Feel Free" by an unknown writer from Australia (this was actually nearly the title of Murs' debut album), it was decided to make Murs' material for the first album of a ska/reggae influence throughout. "Please Don't Let Me Go" was written by Murs along with Claude Kelly and Steve Robson in one of the first writing sessions for the album. They have continued to work with Murs on all his following albums since.

The pop song is about a minor relationship Murs was in where he ended up feeling something for the other person. Murs commented: "Sadly she kept giving me the impression that she didn't like me as much, and ultimately it didn't work out, so that's where the idea of me singing 'Please Don't Let Me Go' came from." Murs said he was excited to be releasing the single, stating that it was important to him that it was an original song, and that he wanted it to be different from his performances on The X Factor. The song premiered on Capital FM on 2 July 2010.

== Music video ==
The music video for "Please Don't Let Me Go" premiered on 23 July 2010. It was filmed on location at a house near Reading, Berkshire. The video shows Murs pursuing a young girl who is playing hard-to-get at a large party. When he starts to lose hope, she then pursues him and the video culminates with both of them dancing into the night. The woman playing the female subject of the song was chosen personally by Murs. The owner of the house also appeared as an extra in the video. As Murs was well known for his dancing on The X Factor, he wanted a video in which he did not dance, to make it more about the song.

== Critical reception ==
Nick Levine from Digital Spy described "Please Don't Let Me Go" as "a lovely summery reggae-tinged pop tune that bobs along in a thoroughly hummable and not un-Will Young-like fashion" and said that the music video "is just as quintessentially pleasant". A reviewer for children's news programme Newsround rated the song four out of five, stating: "The song is funky, catchy and easy to sing along to. It's quite a mellow, summery sound."

== Promotion ==
Murs promoted the single with live performances on a number of TV shows in the run up to the single's release, including GMTV, The Michael Ball Show, This Morning, Stephen Mulhern's Magic Numbers, Suck My Pop and Live from Studio Five. Later performances of the single came during promotion of the Olly Murs album in the winter of 2010, at T4 Stars of 2010 and that year's Christmas Day edition of Top of the Pops.

It was also infamously, in an interview with Heat magazine during promotion for the single, that Murs declared he would strip naked in a photoshoot for them if the single were to reach number one, despite his belief that it would not, as it was being released the same week as Katy Perry's song Teenage Dream. After the single debuted at number one, he then went on to fulfill his promise for the magazine, appearing naked in the 14 September 2010 issue, with a trilby hat covering his modesty.

== Track listing ==
Digital download and CD single
No.	Title	Writer(s)	Length
1.	"Please Don't Let Me Go"	Olly Murs, Claude Kelly, Steve Robson	3:30
2.	"This One's For the Girls"	Olly Murs, James Bryan, George Astasio, Jason Pebworth, Jon Shave	3:19

== Chart performance ==
The single made its chart debut on 3 September, where it debuted at number five on the Irish chart. On 5 September, the single debuted at number-one on the UK chart, having sold 93,239 copies. The single spent only one week at the top of the singles chart, having been dethroned by fellow X Factor contestant Alexandra Burke and her single "Start Without You". Both songs kept "Teenage Dream" by Katy Perry off the top. "Please Don't Let Me Go" spent three weeks within the top 10 and nine weeks within the top 40. Following the release of Murs' second single "Thinking of Me", the single re-entered the top 40 at number thirty-nine; bringing its total weeks spent within the top 40 to ten. Due to downloads, the single's B-side "This One's for the Girls" charted for one week at number 69.

== Personnel ==
- Lead vocals – Olly Murs
- Writer – Olly Murs, Claude Kelly, Steve Robson
- Producer – Future Cut, Steve Robson
- Mixer – Steve Fitzmaurice
- Mix Assistant - Darren Heelis

== Charts ==
=== Weekly charts ===
Chart (2010)	Peak position
Belgium (Ultratip Bubbling Under Flanders)	31
Europe (European Hot 100 Singles)	8
Ireland (IRMA)	5
Slovakia Airplay (ČNS IFPI)	38
Scotland Singles (OCC)	2
UK Singles (OCC)	1

=== Year-end charts ===
Chart (2010)	Position
UK Singles (OCC)	55

== Certifications ==
Region	Certification	Certified units/sales
United Kingdom (BPI)	Platinum	600,000^{‡}
^{‡} Sales+streaming figures based on certification alone.

== Release history ==
Country	Date	Format
Ireland	27 August 2010	Digital download
United Kingdom	29 August 2010	Digital download
United Kingdom	30 August 2010	CD single
Australia	27 August 2010	Digital download
New Zealand	17 September 2010	Digital download

== See also ==
- List of number-one singles from the 2010s (UK)
