= Right Place Right Time Tour =

2013 concert tour by Olly Murs

- Tour by Olly Murs
- Associated album: Right Place Right Time
- Start date: 26 February 2013
- End date: 16 November 2013
- Legs: 6
- No. of shows: 55 in Europe; 17 in North America; 6 in Australasia; 78 Total

Olly Murs concert chronology
- In Case You Didn't Know Tour (2012); Right Place Right Time Tour (2013); Never Been Better Tour (2015)

The Right Place Right Time Tour was the second concert tour by British recording artist Olly Murs. The tour supported his third studio album Right Place Right Time (2012). In November 2013 a DVD of the O2 date was released as part of a special edition of the album.

== Critical reception ==
While reviewing the opening show of the tour, Gordon Barr of Evening Chronicle praised the whole show commenting, "what a refreshing change to see a performer up there on stage genuinely enjoying himself." Barr also compared Murs to Robbie Williams. Katie Pavid from The Journal wrote that the "show proved emphatically that he is capable of creating bold reggae-pop with soulful overtones, as well as being completely in control of an enthralled audience."

== Opening acts ==
- Loveable Rogues (Europe, Leg 1)
- Tich (Europe, Leg 1)
- Before You Exit (North America, Leg 2)
- Bonnie Anderson (Australia)
- Diana Vickers (Middlesbrough)
- Amelia Lily (Middlesbrough)

== Setlist ==
The following setlist was obtained from the concert held on 2 April 2013, at The O_{2} in Dublin, Ireland. It does not represent all concerts for the duration of the tour.

1. "Army of Two"
2. "Dance with Me Tonight"
3. "Personal"
4. "Thinking of Me"
5. "I've Tried Everything"
6. "I Need You Now"
7. "Hey You Beautiful"
8. "I'm OK"
9. "Hand on Heart"
10. "Loud and Clear"
11. "Busy" / "Heart on My Sleeve"
12. "Careless Whisper" / "Reet Petite" / "C'est la vie" / "Crazy in Love"
13. "Please Don't Let Me Go"
14. "Dear Darlin'"
15. "One of These Days"
16. "Oh My Goodness"
17. "Heart Skips a Beat"

Encore

18. "Right Place Right Time"
19. "Troublemaker"

== Tour dates ==
| Date | City | Country | Venue |
|---|---|---|---|
North America
| 24 January 2013 | New York City | United States | Irving Plaza |
| 26 January 2013 | Chicago | United States | House of Blues |
| 29 January 2013 | West Hollywood | United States | House of Blues |
Europe
| 26 February 2013 | Newcastle | England | Metro Radio Arena |
| 27 February 2013 | Nottingham | England | Capital FM Arena |
| 1 March 2013 | Sheffield | England | Motorpoint Arena |
| 2 March 2013 | Sheffield | England | Motorpoint Arena |
| 3 March 2013 | Nottingham | England | Capital FM Arena |
| 5 March 2013 | Brighton | England | Brighton Centre |
| 6 March 2013 | Brighton | England | Brighton Centre |
| 8 March 2013 | Bournemouth | England | Windsor Hall |
| 9 March 2013 | Bournemouth | England | Windsor Hall |
| 10 March 2013 | London | England | Wembley Arena |
| 12 March 2013 | Birmingham | England | LG Arena |
| 13 March 2013 | Liverpool | England | Liverpool Echo Arena |
| 15 March 2013 | Glasgow | Scotland | SECC Concert Hall 4 |
| 16 March 2013 | Glasgow | Scotland | SECC Concert Hall 4 |
| 18 March 2013 | Aberdeen | Scotland | GE Oil and Gas Arena |
| 20 March 2013 | Birmingham | England | National Indoor Arena |
| 21 March 2013 | Manchester | England | Manchester Arena |
| 22 March 2013 | Manchester | England | Manchester Arena |
| 23 March 2013 | Newcastle | England | Metro Radio Arena |
| 25 March 2013 | Cardiff | Wales | Cardiff International Arena |
| 26 March 2013 | Cardiff | Wales | Cardiff International Arena |
| 27 March 2013 | Liverpool | England | Liverpool Echo Arena |
| 29 March 2013 | London | England | The O_{2} Arena |
| 30 March 2013 | London | England | The O_{2} Arena |
| 1 April 2013 | Dublin | Ireland | The O_{2} |
| 2 April 2013 | Dublin | Ireland | The O_{2} |
| 3 April 2013 | Belfast | Northern Ireland | Odyssey Arena |
| 4 April 2013 | Belfast | Northern Ireland | Odyssey Arena |
North America
| 19 April 2013 | Silver Spring | United States | The Fillmore Silver Spring |
| 20 April 2013 | Philadelphia | United States | Trocadero Theatre |
| 22 April 2013 | Boston | United States | Brighton Music Hall |
| 28 April 2013 | Milwaukee | United States | Rave Hall |
| 30 April 2013 | Detroit | United States | Saint Andrew's Hall |
| 1 May 2013 | Toronto | Canada | Phoenix Concert Theatre |
| 4 May 2013 | Cincinnati | United States | Bogart's |
| 6 May 2013 | Atlanta | United States | Center Stage Theater |
| 7 May 2013 | Lake Buena Vista | United States | House of Blues |
| 8 May 2013 | Tampa | United States | The Ritz Ybor |
| 11 May 2013 | Las Vegas | United States | PURE Nightclub |
| 14 May 2013 | San Francisco | United States | The Fillmore |
| 15 May 2013 | Anaheim | United States | House of Blues |
| 18 May 2013^{[A]} | Mansfield | United States | Comcast Center |
Europe
| 2 June 2013 | Peterborough | England | The Embankment |
| 6 June 2013 | Scarborough | England | Scarborough Open Air Theatre |
| 7 June 2013 | Middlesbrough | England | Centre Square |
| 9 June 2013^{[B]} | London | England | Wembley Stadium |
| 12 June 2013^{[C]} | Cork | Ireland | The Docklands |
| 23 June 2013 | Tetbury | England | Westonbirt Arboretum |
| 6 July 2013 | London^{[D]} | England | Royal Albert Hall |
| 6 July 2013 | Alton^{[E]} | England | Alton Towers Concert Arena |
| 7 July 2013 | Exminster | England | Powderham Castle |
| 19 July 2013^{[F]} | Pori | Finland | Kirjurinluoto Arena |
| 28 July 2013 | Leeds^{[G]} | England | Temple Newsam |
| 28 July 2013 | Manchester^{[H]} | England | Phones 4u Arena |
| 17 August 2013^{[I]} | Weston-under-Lizard | England | Weston Park |
| 18 August 2013^{[I]} | Chelmsford | England | Hylands Park |
| 7 September 2013^{[J]} | Gibraltar | England | Victoria Stadium |
| 30 September 2013 | Paris | France | Le Trianon |
| 1 October 2013 | Brussels | Belgium | Ancienne Belgique |
| 2 October 2013 | Amsterdam | Netherlands | Melkweg |
| 4 October 2013 | Düsseldorf | Germany | Mitsubishi Electric Halle |
| 5 October 2013 | Stuttgart | Germany | Liederhalle |
| 6 October 2013 | Munich | Germany | Kulturhalle Zenith |
| 8 October 2013 | Zürich | Switzerland | Volkshaus |
| 9 October 2013 | Offenbach | Germany | Stadthalle Offenbach |
| 10 October 2013 | Berlin | Germany | Tempodrom |
| 11 October 2013 | Hamburg | Germany | Alsterdorfer Sporthalle |
| 13 October 2013 | Copenhagen | Denmark | Vega |
| 14 October 2013 | Stockholm | Sweden | Fryshuset |
Australasia
| 7 November 2013 | Auckland | New Zealand | ASB Theatre |
| 9 November 2013 | Sydney | Australia | The Star Event Centre |
| 10 November 2013 | Sydney | Australia | Metro Theatre |
| 12 November 2013 | Newcastle | Australia | Newcastle Civic Theatre |
| 14 November 2013 | Melbourne | Australia | MCEC Plenary Hall |
| 16 November 2013 | Brisbane | Australia | BCEC Great Hall |

Festivals and other miscellaneous performances
^{A} This concert was a part of the "Kiss 108 Concert"
^{B} This concert was a part of the "Summertime Ball"
^{C} This concert was a part of "Live at the Marquee"
^{D} This concert was a part of the "Rays of Sunshine Concert"
^{E} This concert was a part of "Alton Towers Live"
^{F} This concert was a part of "Pori Jazz"
^{G} This concert was a part of "Party in the Park"
^{H} This concert was a part of "Key 103 Live"
^{I} This concert was a part of "V Festival"
^{J} This concert was a part of the "Gibraltar Music Festival"

=== Box office score data ===
| Venue | City | Tickets Sold / Available | Gross Revenue |
|---|---|---|---|
| Motorpoint Arena | Sheffield | 22,500 / 22,500 (100%) | $1,090,910 |
| Brighton Centre | Brighton | 9,820 / 9,820 (100%) | $469,605 |
| Windsor Hall | Bournemouth | 8,890 / 8,890 (100%) | $421,282 |
| Wembley Arena | London | 10,833 / 10,833 (100%) | $549,632 |
| SECC Concert Hall 4 | Glasgow | 17,049 / 17,049 (100%) | $815,463 |
| GE Oil and Gas Arena | Aberdeen | 4,450 / 4,450 (100%) | $212,723 |
| National Indoor Arena | Birmingham | 11,315 / 11,315 (100%) | $555,404 |
| Manchester Arena | Manchester | 23,015 / 25,000 (92%) | $1,130,080 |
| Metro Radio Arena | Newcastle | 16,881 / 16,898 (100%) | $745,929 |
| Cardiff International Arena | Cardiff | 8,912 / 8,912 (100%) | $434,272 |
| The O_{2} Arena | London | 29,059 / 29,059 (100%) | $1,496,840 |
| BCEC Great Hall | Brisbane | 2,628 / 3,175 (83%) | $174,765 |
| TOTAL | | 165,352 / 167,901 (98%) | $8,096,905 |
