= Never Been Better Tour =

2015 concert tour by Olly Murs

- Tour by Olly Murs
- Associated album: Never Been Better
- Start date: 31 March 2015
- End date: 23 August 2015
- No. of shows: 45 in Europe; 5 in Australia; 50 total

Olly Murs concert chronology
- Right Place Right Time Tour (2013); Never Been Better Tour (2015); 24 Hrs Tour (2017)

Never Been Better Tour was a concert tour by English singer Olly Murs. The tour supports his fourth studio album Never Been Better (2014) and was announced in November 2014. Originally, only a leg consisting of 14 shows in UK was planned, but due to high demand, the run was expanded with more dates, also in the rest of Europe.

== Set list ==
This set list is representative of the two shows in Sheffield on 31 March 2015 and 1 April 2015. It is not representative of all concerts for the duration of the tour.

1. "Did You Miss Me"
2. "Right Place Right Time"
3. "Why Do I Love You"
4. "Hey You Beautiful"
5. "Hand on Heart"
6. "Never Been Better"
7. "Seasons"
8. Medley: "Thinking of Me" / "Busy" / "Please Don't Let Me Go"
9. "Oh My Goodness"
10. "Hope You Got What You Came For"
11. "Heart Skips a Beat"
12. "Up" (with Ella Eyre)
13. "Dance with Me Tonight"
14. "Let Me In"
15. "Dear Darlin'"
16. "Uptown Funk" (Mark Ronson cover)
17. "Beautiful To Me"
18. "Troublemaker"

Encore:

19. "Nothing Without You"
20. "Wrapped Up"

== Shows ==
List of concerts, showing date, city, country, venue, opening act, tickets sold, number of available tickets and amount of gross revenue
Date	City	Country	Venue	Opening act
Leg 1 — Europe
31 March 2015	Sheffield	England	Motorpoint Arena Sheffield	Ella Eyre
1 April 2015	Sheffield	England	Motorpoint Arena Sheffield	Ella Eyre
3 April 2015	Cardiff	Wales	Motorpoint Arena Cardiff	Ella Eyre
4 April 2015	Cardiff	Wales	Motorpoint Arena Cardiff	Ella Eyre
7 April 2015	Belfast	Northern Ireland	Odyssey Arena	Ella Eyre
8 April 2015	Belfast	Northern Ireland	Odyssey Arena	Ella Eyre
10 April 2015	Dublin	Ireland	3Arena	Ella Eyre
11 April 2015	Dublin	Ireland	3Arena	Ella Eyre
12 April 2015	Dublin	Ireland	3Arena	Ella Eyre
14 April 2015	Glasgow	Scotland	The SSE Hydro	Ella Eyre
15 April 2015	Glasgow	Scotland	The SSE Hydro	Ella Eyre
16 April 2015	Glasgow	Scotland	The SSE Hydro	Ella Eyre
18 April 2015	Newcastle	England	Metro Radio Arena	Ella Eyre
19 April 2015	Newcastle	England	Metro Radio Arena	Ella Eyre
20 April 2015	Leeds	England	First Direct Arena	Ella Eyre
22 April 2015	Manchester	England	Manchester Arena	Ella Eyre
23 April 2015	Manchester	England	Manchester Arena	Ella Eyre
24 April 2015	Manchester	England	Manchester Arena	Ella Eyre
26 April 2015	Birmingham	England	Barclaycard Arena	Ella Eyre
27 April 2015	Birmingham	England	Barclaycard Arena	Ella Eyre
28 April 2015	Birmingham	England	Barclaycard Arena	Ella Eyre
30 April 2015	Nottingham	England	Capital FM Arena	Ella Eyre
1 May 2015	Nottingham	England	Capital FM Arena	Ella Eyre
3 May 2015	London	England	O_{2} Arena	Ella Eyre
4 May 2015	London	England	O_{2} Arena	Ella Eyre
5 May 2015	London	England	O_{2} Arena	Ella Eyre
7 May 2015	London	England	O_{2} Arena	Ella Eyre
8 May 2015	Liverpool	England	Echo Arena	Ella Eyre
18 May 2015	Paris	France	Paris Olympia	Ella Eyre
20 May 2015	Copenhagen	Denmark	Falkoner Center	Ella Eyre
21 May 2015	Oslo	Norway	Sentrum Scene	Ella Eyre
22 May 2015	Stockholm	Sweden	Gröna Lund	Ella Eyre
26 May 2015	Hamburg	Germany	O_{2} World	Ella Eyre
27 May 2015	Oberhausen	Germany	König Pilsener Arena	Ella Eyre
29 May 2015	Hannover	Germany	Expo Plaza	Ella Eyre
30 May 2015	Bern	Switzerland	Festhalle	Ella Eyre
31 May 2015	Vienna	Austria	Gasometer	Ella Eyre
2 June 2015 (Note: The June 2, 2015 show at the Milan La Fabrique in Milan was originally scheduled to take place on June 1, 2015.)	Milan	Italy	Milan La Fabrique	Ella Eyre
3 June 2015	Munich	Germany	Olympiahalle	Ella Eyre
7 June 2015 (Note: The June 7, 2015 show at the Lotto Arena in Antwerp was originally scheduled to take place on May 16, 2015.)	Antwerp	Belgium	Lotto Arena	Ella Eyre
9 June 2015	Amsterdam	Netherlands	Heineken Music Hall	Ella Eyre
10 June 2015	Copenhagen	Denmark	Falkoner Center	Ella Eyre
Leg 2 — Australia				Ella Eyre
4 August 2015	Perth	Australia	Perth Arena	
6 August 2015	Brisbane	Australia	Brisbane Convention & Exhibition Centre	
8 August 2015	Melbourne	Australia	Margaret Court Arena	
9 August 2015	Adelaide	Australia	Adelaide Entertainment Centre	
11 August 2015	Sydney	Australia	Enmore Theatre	
Leg 3 — Europe
22 August 2015 (Note: The August 22, 2015 show at the Hylands Park in Chelmsford was a part of the 2015 V Festival.)	Chelmsford	England	Hylands Park	
23 August 2015 (Note: The August 23, 2015 show at the Weston Park in Weston-under-Lizard was a part of the 2015 V Festival.)	Weston-under-Lizard	England	Weston Park	
