= Pachi =

Pachi may refer to:

- Pachi, Kerman (پچي - Pachī), a village in the Central District of Rigan County, Kerman Province, Iran
- Pachi, Mazandaran (پاچي - Pāchī), a village in Dodangeh District, Sari County, Mazandaran Province, Iran
- Pachi, Megara, Greece (Greek: Πάχη Μεγάρων), a village in West Attica, Municipality of Megara, Greece
- Pachi the Porcupine, the mascot of the 2015 Pan American Games
- Danner Pachi (born 1984), Bolivian football player
