= Right Place, Right Time =

Right Place, Right Time may refer to:

- "Right Place, Right Time" (How I Met Your Mother), an episode of How I Met Your Mother
- Right Place Right Time (album), an album by Olly Murs
  - "Right Place Right Time" (song), its title track
- Right Place, Right Time, a 1984 album, or its title song, by Denise LaSalle
- "Right Place Right Time", a 2022 song by Stereophonics from Oochya!

== See also ==
- Right Place, Wrong Time (disambiguation)
- Wrong Place, Right Time, an album by Haymaker
- "Wrong Place, Wrong Time", song by Mark Chesnutt
