= Cry Your Heart Out =

Cry Your Heart Out may refer to:

- "Cry Your Heart Out", a song by Olly Murs from the album Right Place Right Time, 2012
- "Cry Your Heart Out", a song by Adele from the album 30, 2021
