= Troublemaker (Olly Murs song) =

Single by Olly Murs featuring Flo Rida

from the album Right Place Right Time
- Released: 12 October 2012
- Recorded: 2012
- Genre: Pop; pop rap; disco
- Length: 3:06 (Album version); 2:54 (Without Rap); 3:21 (Extended Radio Edit)
- Label: Epic; Syco
- Songwriters: Olly Murs; Steve Robson; Claude Kelly; Tramar Dillard
- Producer: Steve Robson

Olly Murs singles chronology
"Oh My Goodness" (2012)	"Troublemaker" (2012)	"Army of Two" (2013)

Flo Rida singles chronology
"I Cry" (2012)	"Troublemaker" (2012)	"Change Your Life" (2012)

"Troublemaker" is a song by English recording artist Olly Murs, released as the lead single from his third studio album, Right Place Right Time (2012). It features American rapper Flo Rida. "Troublemaker" was co-written by Murs, Steve Robson, Claude Kelly and Flo Rida, and was produced by Robson. The song premiered on 8 October 2012, in the United Kingdom on the Capital FM radio station and was made available to download on 12 October in certain international territories.

"Troublemaker" was a major commercial success. In the United Kingdom, the song debuted atop the UK Singles Chart, making it Murs' fourth solo single to reach number one and his first to spend more than a week at the top spot. It also served as the closing song at Murs's 2013 arena tour. It is Murs' signature song and biggest hit single to date.

== Background and release ==
"Troublemaker" was written by Olly Murs along with Claude Kelly and Steve Robson, with whom he also wrote his previous hits "Please Don't Let Me Go" and "Dance with Me Tonight". Lyrically Murs has said that the song is about "that special girl that you can't shake off, even if you know you should because, let's face it, she's got a bit of a wild side."

Murs said that although he initially expected it would be difficult to get Flo Rida to appear on the track, it was "kind of easy, in a way. [It] wasn't hard ... We just literally sent him the track, his people heard the track and they really liked it. And Flo Rida was like, 'I really want to do it'. So he was up for doing it." Flo Rida spoke about Murs and his appearance on the track during a promotional interview for his single "I Cry" on ITV breakfast show Daybreak on 26 September 2012, saying: "I'm very excited, [my record company said] we have this record from a guy named Olly. As soon as I heard it, I know a hit record when I hear it. I'll probably have a chance to meet him soon." "Troublemaker" premiered in the United Kingdom on 8 October 2012 on Capital FM. The premiere was followed by a "bold and colourful" lyric video that was posted on Murs' Vevo account. At a launch party for the album, Murs revealed that "Troublemaker" was originally meant to be the second single from the album with "Army of Two" being the first single, but this idea was scrapped due to Murs' work in America.

== Composition ==
"Troublemaker" (2013)
An 18 second sample of Olly Murs' "Troublemaker".

"Troublemaker" is an uptempo pop song which lasts for a duration of three minutes and six seconds, containing influences of soul and disco. According to the digital sheet music published by Alfred Music Publishing, "Troublemaker" is written in the key of C minor and it is set at a groove of 106 beats per minute. The chorus is written in E-flat major. Described as an "airy pop anthem" the songs' instrumentation consists of "lightly funky, guitar-led backdrop", which some critics have compared the guitar riffs to Maroon 5's "This Love" and "Misery".

== Reception ==
=== Critical reception ===
The song received positive reviews from critics. Seventeen wrote that it is "upbeat and just as catchy" as Murs previous single "Heart Skips a Beat". Amy Sciarretto of PopCrush called it "an uptempo pop delight". John Aizlewood of BBC Music favored Flo Rida's appearance describing it as an "engaging cameo". Robert Copsey of Digital Spy gave the song a four out of five star rating, praising its composition, but he criticised Flo Rida's appearance, describing it "confusing, [...] but if it makes Olly a hit across the pond, we suppose we can let it slide." Idolator's Robbie Daw echoed Copsey's comments describing the song " a total disco-pop winner, and would stand on its own without [Flo Rida]." The song was nominated for Best British Single at the 2013 BRIT Awards, which was held on 20 February 2013, but lost out to Adele's "Skyfall".

=== Chart performance ===
"Troublemaker" was first released in the Netherlands on 18 October 2012 and peaked at number 98 on the Single Top 100. In the United Kingdom, "Troublemaker" debuted at number one with 121,000 copies on 2 December 2012. With "Troublemaker" debuting atop the singles chart, it marked Murs' fourth and Flo Rida's fifth number one single in the UK. In its second week the song retained its number-one position scoring his first "chart double" with Right Place Right Time. Murs was the fourth act in 2012 to achieve that feat following Gary Barlow, Robbie Williams and One Direction. "Troublemaker" sold over 441,000 copies in the UK in 2012, becoming the 29th biggest-seller of the year. As of November 2016, it has sold 765,000 copies, making it Murs' second best-selling song, behind "Dance with Me Tonight".

"Troublemaker" debuted at number nineteen on the Australian Singles Chart on 9 December 2012, becoming the second-highest debut for the week. The following week the song entered the top-ten peaking at number four. The song has been certified double-platinum by the Australian Recording Industry Association, denoting shipments of 140,000 copies. "Troublemaker" entered the New Zealand Singles Chart at number fourteen on 10 December 2012, giving Murs his first single to chart in that country. On its fourth week the song cracked the top-ten reaching number eight and remained at that position two weeks, before gaining a new peak of number seven on 14 January 2013. "Troublemaker" has received a gold certification from the Recording Industry Association of New Zealand (RIANZ), denoting shipments of 7,500 copies. On 31 December 2012 the song debuted at number 38 on the Billboard Pop Songs chart. It debuted at number 87 on the Billboard Hot 100 on 24 January 2013, and has continued climbing every week since, with its current peak now at number 25, making it Murs' highest charting US single to date. It has sold over a million downloads in the US as of May 2013.

== Music video ==
=== Background ===
The official music video was filmed in Los Angeles, California over two days, on 21 and 22 September 2012. An American casting agency site revealed in their advert that the story of the video revolves around Murs and a female lead who is "so ditzy she keeps getting fired from her jobs, and by coincidence, keeps crossing paths with Olly." Another casting agency released a montage of pictures from the set of filming of the video on their Facebook page on 26 September, including a shot of Murs being arrested by a police officer which did not make the final version. Flo Rida filmed his part of the video separately to Murs in Miami, Florida on 30 September, and released a picture of himself at the filming location on his Instagram account that same day. The video premiered on Murs' YouTube account on 22 October 2012 and has since been viewed over 240 million times.

=== Synopsis ===
The video starts with Murs entering a cafe, where he sees a young woman (played by actress Danielle Beckwith) working as a waitress there. She pours water on a customer in retaliation to him smacking her bottom, causing her to be fired by her boss. He then meets the woman again, who is now working in a record shop and sees her stacking records (including one that has picture of Murs on it that says "Olly Murs' Greatest Hits"), but due to her wearing headphones she can't hear what a customer is saying to her and gets fired again. Next, Murs sees her working at a clothes store where she is dressing mannequins but when she notices Murs watching her she ends up knocking them over and then takes her jacket and leaves the store. Flo Rida is then seen in a billboard on a beach next to a luxury car with two bikini clad women inside it. The video ends with Murs seeing the woman again, this time in a nightclub with friends where she accidentally knocks over a man carrying a tray of drinks, setting off a further chain of arguments. Murs comes to her rescue and the two begin to leave but are stopped by one of the club's bouncers and the screen cuts to black with the word "Troublemaker".

== Live performances ==
On 5 November 2012, Murs uploaded a live performance of "Troublemaker" to his official Vevo account. The live performance showcased his vocals in a laid-back alternate take on the song which was backed with a string section and further male vocalists. Trent Maynard of 4Music described the performance as "stunning" and praised Murs for "nailing flawless vocals" and his "star power" without the presence of Flo Rida. "Troublemaker" was performed for the first time on 12 October 2012 at "Love Music Live" gig organised by Heart Radio in London. On 18 November 2012, Murs performed the song on the ninth season of The X Factor UK.

In the United States, Murs performed the song for the first time on the daytime chat show Live! with Kelly and Michael on 23 January 2013. He also performed an acoustic version of the song for Billboard magazine's Next Big Things' Session along with "Heart Skips a Beat". In April 2013, he made a guest appearance on the fifth season of the American drama series, 90210 as himself and performed "Troublemaker" and "Right Place Right Time".

During the Never Been Better Tour, Murs would normally sing the song solo, but on the dates at the O2 Arena in London and the Liverpool Echo Arena, Murs was joined by Robbie Williams (London date) and John Bishop (Liverpool date).

== Track listing ==
- Digital download
1. "Troublemaker" – 3:06
- CD single
1. "Troublemaker" – 3:06
2. "Troublemaker" – (Cutmore Club Mix) – 4:38
- iTunes Remixes EP
1. "Troublemaker" – 3:06
2. "Troublemaker" (Cutmore Club Mix) – 4:38
3. "Troublemaker" (Cutmore Radio Edit) – 2:35
4. "Troublemaker" (Wideboys Radio Edit) – 3:23

== Charts ==
=== Weekly charts ===
Chart (2012–13)	Peak position
Australia (ARIA)	4
Austria (Ö3 Austria Top 40)	3
Belgium (Ultratop 50 Flanders)	25
Belgium (Ultratip Bubbling Under Wallonia)	5
Bulgarian Airplay (IFPI)	2
Canada Hot 100 (Billboard)	15
Canada AC (Billboard)	28
Canada CHR/Top 40 (Billboard)	12
Canada Hot AC (Billboard)	13
Czech Republic Airplay (ČNS IFPI)	3
Denmark (Tracklisten)	13
Finland (Suomen virallinen lista)	12
France (SNEP)	41
Germany (GfK)	2
Germany (Airplay Chart)	1
Hungary (Rádiós Top 40)	1
Ireland (IRMA)	3
Italy (FIMI)	14
Italian Airplay (EarOne)	6
Israel International Airplay (Media Forest)	8
Japan (Japan Hot 100)	4
Luxembourg Digital Songs (Billboard)	2
Mexico Anglo (Monitor Latino)	9
Netherlands (Single Top 100)	66
New Zealand (Recorded Music NZ)	5
Russia Airplay (TopHit)	9
Scottish Singles Sales (Official Charts)	1
Slovakia Airplay (ČNS IFPI)	5
Spain (Promusicae)	19
Sweden (Sverigetopplistan)	31
Switzerland (Schweizer Hitparade)	8
UK Radio Airplay (Nielsen Soundscan)	1
UK Singles (Official Charts)	1 (Note: The UK Singles Chart peak position is for a sales-only chart. Data from the streaming chart was not incorporated until July 2014.)
UK Streaming (Official Charts)	4
UK TV Airplay (Nielsen Soundscan)	1
Ukraine Airplay (TopHit)	11
US Billboard Hot 100	25
US Adult Pop Airplay (Billboard)	13
US Pop Airplay (Billboard)	10

=== Year-end charts ===
Chart (2012)	Position
Hungary (Rádiós Top 40)	50
UK Singles (Official Charts Company)	29

Chart (2013)	Position
Australia (ARIA)	69
Austria (Ö3 Austria Top 40)	45
Canada (Canadian Hot 100)	41
France (SNEP)	199
Germany (Official German Charts)	35
Hungary (Rádiós Top 40)	75
Italy (FIMI)	76
Japan (Japan Hot 100)	66
New Zealand (Recorded Music NZ)	40
Russia Airplay (TopHit)	53
Switzerland (Schweizer Hitparade)	57
Ukraine Airplay (TopHit)	42
UK Singles (Official Charts Company)	71
US Billboard Hot 100	82
US Mainstream Top 40 (Billboard)	49

== Certifications ==
Region	Certification	Certified units/sales
Australia (ARIA)	4× Platinum	280,000^{‡}
Austria (IFPI Austria)	Gold	15,000^{*}
Canada (Music Canada)	2× Platinum	160,000^{*}
Germany (BVMI)	Gold	150,000^{^}
Italy (FIMI)	Gold	15,000^{*}
Mexico (AMPROFON)	Gold	30,000^{*}
New Zealand (RMNZ)	2× Platinum	30,000^{*}
Spain (Promusicae)	Gold	30,000^{‡}
Sweden (GLF)	Platinum	40,000^{‡}
Switzerland (IFPI Switzerland)	Gold	15,000^{^}
United Kingdom (BPI)	3× Platinum	1,800,000^{‡}
United States (RIAA)	Platinum	1,000,000
Streaming
Denmark (IFPI Danmark)	2× Platinum	3,600,000^{†}
^{*} Sales figures based on certification alone.^{^} Shipments figures based on certification alone.^{‡} Sales+streaming figures based on certification alone.^{†} Streaming-only figures based on certification alone.

== Radio and release history ==
Country	Date	Format	Label
United Kingdom	8 October 2012	Radio premiere	Epic Records
Austria	12 October 2012	Digital download	Sony Music
Canada	12 October 2012	Digital download	Sony Music
Germany	12 October 2012	Digital download	Sony Music
New Zealand	12 October 2012	Digital download	Sony Music
United States	12 October 2012	Digital download	Sony Music
Sweden	12 October 2012	Digital download	Sony Music
Switzerland	12 October 2012	Digital download	Sony Music
Netherlands	19 October 2012	Digital download	Sony Music
Argentina	16 November 2012	Digital remixes	Sony Music
Brazil	16 November 2012	Digital download	Sony Music
Czech Republic	16 November 2012	Digital remixes	Sony Music
Denmark	16 November 2012	Digital remixes	Sony Music
Finland	16 November 2012	Digital remixes	Sony Music
Hungary	16 November 2012	Digital remixes	Sony Music
Ireland	16 November 2012	Digital remixes	Sony Music
Italy	16 November 2012	Digital remixes	Sony Music
Norway	16 November 2012	Digital remixes	Sony Music
Poland	16 November 2012	Digital remixes	Sony Music
Portugal	16 November 2012	Digital remixes	Sony Music
Spain	16 November 2012	Digital remixes	Sony Music
Sweden	16 November 2012	Digital remixes	Sony Music
Switzerland	16 November 2012	Digital remixes	Sony Music
United Kingdom	16 November 2012	Digital remixes	Sony Music
United States	8 January 2013	Contemporary hit radio	Columbia Records
Austria	25 January 2013	Digital remixes	Sony Music
Germany	25 January 2013	CD single	Sony Music
Germany	25 January 2013	Digital remixes	Sony Music
