= Right Place, Wrong Time =

Right Place, Wrong Time may refer to:

- "Right Place, Wrong Time" (song), a song by Dr. John
- Right Place, Wrong Time (album), an album by Otis Rush
- "Right Place, Wrong Time", a song by Avant from Director
- "Right Place, Wrong Time", a song by Screaming Jets from Heart of the Matter
- "Right Place, Wrong Time", a song by Soul Position from 8 Million Stories

== See also ==
- Wrong Place, Right Time, an album by Haymaker
- Right Place, Right Time (disambiguation)
