= Pachi the Porcupine =

Pachi the Porcupine

Pachi is the name of the mascot of the 2015 Pan American Games and the 2015 Parapan American Games. The Games were held in Toronto, Canada, in 2015. The winning mascot was designed by Michelle Ing, Paige Kunihiro, Jenny Lee and Fiona Hong from Buttonville Public School in Markham, Ontario.

== Background ==
Pachi was unveiled on July 13, 2013. Canadian schoolchildren played a role in narrowing the choice of mascot whose design is based on that of the porcupine, an animal found in all 41 countries competing at the Games. There are 41 stylized conical spines on Pachi's back: one for every country participating in the Pan American Games. The spines are one of five colours, each of the five representing a quality the Games are said to endorse: youth, passion, collaboration, determination, and creativity.

Porcupines have relatively poor vision, so the choice of basing Pachi's design on a porcupine is said to be a symbolic bond with the athletes of the Parapan Games.

Seventeen performers were hired to don a Pachi suit, and play Pachi. "Inner Ninja" by Nova Scotian rapper Classified served as Pachi's official theme song.

Selected Pachi's design and operating costs
Cost	Description
$93,232	Mascot Creation Challenge
$32,900	Promotional video about the Mascot Challenge
$5,000	Licensing Pachi's theme music
$3,006	Mascot selection photo shoot
$33,250	Mascot research
$472,184	Print advertisements
$134,550	Mascot payroll

After the Pan Am and Parapan Am Games, Pachi became the mascot for the Ontario Games. Pachi's appearance were slightly changed. The Pan Am and Parapan Am branding on the hat and wristbands were replaced by Ontario Games branding. The hat changed to white and the quills consist of red, green and blue colours.
