= 90210 season 5 =

90210
- Season 5
- DVD cover
- Starring: Shenae Grimes; Tristan Wilds; AnnaLynne McCord; Jessica Stroup; Michael Steger; Jessica Lowndes; Matt Lanter
- No. of episodes: 22

Release
- Original network: The CW
- Original release: October 8, 2012 – May 13, 2013

Season chronology
- ← Previous; Season 4

The fifth and final season of 90210 was announced on May 3, 2012. On May 17, 2012, it was announced that the show's fifth season would be moving back to Mondays at 8:00pm Eastern/7:00pm Central followed by the sixth season of Gossip Girl at 9:00pm. The season premiered on October 8, 2012.

90210 went on its mid-season break on December 10, 2012, and returned on January 21, 2013, at a new time slot of 9:00 pm, one week after The Carrie Diaries' premiere, which took its original time slot of 8:00 pm.

On January 13, 2013, the President of The CW Mark Pedowitz stated that although 90210 does not have a season 6 renewal in place, the show would most likely be back next year (possibly for the final season if it were to be canceled) due to him being a "big believer in giving fans a very satisfactory conclusion" for long-running shows. In spite of this, in late February it was announced that the fifth season would indeed be the final season of the show, with the series finale airing May 13, 2013.

== Synopsis ==
The West Bev gang learns that adulthood is not easy. In this farewell season, multiple tragedies occur that force the group to make decisions that will change all their lives.

== Cast and characters ==
=== Main ===
- Shenae Grimes as Annie Wilson
- Tristan Wilds as Dixon Wilson
- AnnaLynne McCord as Naomi Clark
- Jessica Stroup as Erin Silver
- Michael Steger as Navid Shirazi
- Jessica Lowndes as Adrianna Tate-Duncan
- Matt Lanter as Liam Court

=== Recurring ===
- Josh Zuckerman as Max Miller
- Trevor Donovan as Teddy Montgomery
- Lyndon Smith as Michaela
- Grant Gustin as Campbell Price
- Justin Deeley as Austin Talridge
- Riley Smith as Riley Wallace
- Charlie Weber as Mark Holland
- Trai Byers as Alec Martin
- Jessica Parker Kennedy as Megan Rose
- Robbie Jones as Jordan Welland
- Wes Brown as Taylor Williams
- Arielle Kebbel as Vanessa Shaw
- Natalie Morales as Ashley Howard
- Peyton List as Lindsey Beckwith
- Amanda Leighton as Alex Scarborough
- Keke Palmer as Elizabeth Royce Harwood
- Rob Mayes as Colin Bell
- Robin Givens as Cheryl Harwood
- Jimmy O. Yang as Henry Lu
- Chris McKenna as Patrick Westhill
- Carmen Electra as Vesta
- Jake Picking as Michael

=== Special guest stars ===
- Lori Loughlin as Debbie Wilson
- Prince Michael Jackson as Cooper
- Christina Moore as Tracy Clark
- Denise Richards as Gwen Thompson
- Lindsey McKeon as Suzanne
- Zachary Ray Sherman as Jasper Herman
- Abbie Cobb as Emily Bradford
- Adam Gregory as Ty Collins
- Carly Rae Jepsen as herself
- Sammy Adams as himself
- Ryan Lochte as himself
- Nelly Furtado as herself
- Ne-Yo as himself
- Jared Eng as himself
- Taio Cruz as himself
- Tegan and Sara as themselves
- Rita Ora as herself
- Terrell Owens as himself
- Joey McIntyre as himself
- Olly Murs as himself
- Fall Out Boy as themselves

== Episodes ==
No. overall	No. in season	Title	Directed by	Written by	Original release date	U.S. viewers (millions)
93	1	"Til Death Do Us Part"	Stuart Gillard	Patti Carr	October 8, 2012	0.94
Continuing where last season left off, Annie, Silver, Liam, Navid, and Teddy come together as they prepare to find out Dixon's fate. Unaware of Dixon's accident, Adriana continues with her tour in Vegas, and runs into her idol. Naomi and Max's honeymoon getaway goes awry.
94	2	"The Sea Change"	Bethany Rooney	Lara Olsen	October 15, 2012	1.06
Two weeks have passed since her and Max got back together, Naomi decides to throw a wedding reception when Max's investors continue to pull out of his and Alec's business. After an interesting conversation with his Physical therapist, Dixion lashes out at people close to him. After being disrespected by Liam and Navid, Silver develops feelings for a supportive Teddy, while awaiting for his answer on whether or not he will have her baby. Adrianna tries to avoid Taylor, who is now Liam and Navid's business partner, but is even more conflicted about her feelings for him when he kisses her. Liam and Vanessa's toxic relationship takes a lethal turn for the worse as one of them suffers a fatal accident.
95	3	"It's All Fun and Games"	Cherie Nowlan	Brian Dawson	October 22, 2012	0.91
Stalling her insemination appointment, Silver and Adrianna spend a carefree day by taking challenges that a normal person in their 20s would do. While Max is away on business, Naomi and Alec starts growing closer, but it leads to mistake. Meanwhile, Annie has a reluctant Dixon meet with a therapy group at CU, when he loses hope at ever walking again and meets Megan (Jessica Parker Kennedy), the daughter of the dead truck driver that caused Dixon's car accident. As the investigation Vanessa's disappearance intensifies, Liam and the cops uncover a bombshell about her past or who she used to be.
96	4	"Into the Wild"	Hanelle Culpepper	Chris Atwood	November 5, 2012	0.85
Naomi plans a romantic getaway with Max, intending to disclose that Alec kissed her, but when Max persuades Naomi to go camping and to perform a trust-building exercise, she freaks out when she's unable to complete it. Silver discovers that the nude pictures from her photo shoot have been posted on the internet, but soon realizes how liberating it could be. Liam enrolls in Lindsey's business law class, but she assumes he's not serious about his education. Liam's new movie costar, Kendall, is harassing him to begin a relationship with her for publicity. Navid is annoyed at the fact that Dixon is performing at the opening of the Pop Up, due to the fact that Dixon hasn't healed and when he blurts out his feelings, it puts a strain in their friendship. Dixon encourages Adrianna to hire Taylor to create her new music video concept.
97	5	"Hate 2 Love"	Sanaa Hamri	Mike Chessler & Chris Alberghini	November 12, 2012	1.16
As Dixon continues to recuperate while receiving strange back pains, Adrianna confides in Annie that she and Dixon are having intimacy issues. Frustrated with Dixon's dedication to his career at the re-opening of Navid and Liam's new nightclub, the Pop Up, Adrianna turns to Taylor for comfort. Navid hopes to show Silver how successful he's become with the launch of the Pop Up, but he becomes suspicious that Silver and Liam are seeing each other. Elsewhere, Silver continues her secret profession of burlesque dancing as an outlet for her emotions. Lindsey comes to the opening event to discuss Liam's business plan, and their animosity gives way to passion. Annie grows closer to Colin, but Riley suspects that Colin isn't who he appears to be. Naomi brings Max's former fiancee, Madison, to try to get her to reveal that Alec tried to destroy her own engagement with Max and in the process show Max the type of person, Alec really is, but it doesn't go according to plan.
98	6	"The Con"	Harry Sinclair	Terrence Coli	November 19, 2012	0.78
Tension comes to ahead for Silver, Liam and Navid in Santa Barbara, which leads to a shocking discovery. Riley admits his feelings to Annie, but Annie's more interested in giving her relationship with Colin a chance. Meanwhile, Max tries to figure out how his company's video game technology got hacked, which forces Naomi to turn to Alec. Taylor feels guilty for hooking up with Adrianna, which leads Adriana decision in who she wants to be with much more easier after a tragedy hits close to home.
99	7	"99 Problems"	Michael Zinberg	William H. Brown	November 26, 2012	0.97
Annie and Riley's relationship suffers when Riley gets upset at the fact that Annie doesn't treat him like her other boyfriends just because he is in a wheelchair. Meanwhile, Adrianna finds out that she is performing at the Hollywood Bowl and thinks Dixon is going to propose to her after reading a text message on his phone. Naomi grows jealous when the replacement for Max's business partner is a hot young woman named Bryce (Amber Stevens) and decides that she should be his partner. Silver is upset at the fact she still isn't pregnant and discovers that she may need surgery. Liam goes crazy after getting a mysterious letter and after punching a paparazzi and getting arrested, his studio sends him a bodyguard, a female cop named Ashley Howard (Natalie Morales).
100	8	"902–100"	Harry Sinclair	Scott Weinger	December 3, 2012	1.00
In the special 100th episode, although they've been out of high school for 2 years, Naomi and the rest of the gang head back to high as Naomi decided to hold a reunion to celebrate the school's 100th anniversary. Teddy returns to Beverly Hills for the alumni event and tells Silver that Shane broke up with him. Shane shows up and reveals that Teddy has been ignoring him. Meanwhile, Dixon is happy when Adrianna signs with his record label until he finds the video of Adrianna kissing Taylor. Annie gets a double blast from the past when she sees Jasper and Emily, and find out that they've accomplish more during their 2 years unlike her. However, Liam thinks Jasper's return is a cause of concern as he has proven back In junior year he always has ulterior motives.
101	9	"The Things We Do for Love"	Matthew Diamond	Marjorie David	December 10, 2012	1.11
With Max unemployed, Alec returns and offers to help him form a new computer company. Naomi attempts to persuade Bryce to rehire Max at his company after she takes over ownership, but she refuses. Naomi convinces Navid to take a distraught Bryce out for drinks to find out why she betrayed and ousted Max from his company. After a few drinks, Navid learns from the half-drunk Bryce that Alec set up Max's firing. When Naomi confronts Alec, she finds out that he is in love with him. She returns home to find out that Max left to go on a gamer conference in Iceland, which leaves Naomi pondering the fate of her marriage. Annie decides to sign up for a writing program in Scotland for the next two years and gets Riley a tablet as a Christmas present, as a way of telling him which in turn angers him into thinking Annie doesn't want him to go with her because he is in a wheelchair. When Riley sees how overjoyed Annie is about Dixon's recovery, he decides to do an experimental surgery in order to walk again. Elsewhere, Silver is distraught when Teddy refuses to sign over his parental rights and tries to convince her to let him co-parent the baby. After a heart to heart with Naomi about their divorced parents, she decides that she doesn't want Teddy to father the baby. Shane later threatens Silver with a lawsuit. Adrianna wants to reconcile with Dixon after he has been torturing her with work, but he is too consumed by his ego and anger to listen to her or anyone else. Also, Dixon tells Megan that he was in the accident that caused her father's death and instead of getting mad, she kisses him. Meanwhile, Liam receives another blackmail letter about Vanessa's accident, in which the blackmailer demands $500,000. Unsure whom to trust, Liam shows the letter to Annie, who agrees to lend Liam the money to help trap his blackmailer. But when Adrianna tells Ashley that she spotted Vanessa at a beauty salon, Ashley wrongly suspects that Liam is headed for a secret rendezvous with Vanessa and kidnaps him. Annie, who is waiting to catch the blackmailer, finds out that it is Vanessa, who is also looking for him. At the Offshore, they get into an argument about Liam's whereabouts while Liam is gagged and tied in the basement watching them on a screen.
102	10	"Misery Loves Company"	Anton Cropper	Allen Clary	January 21, 2013	0.79
Naomi and Adrianna take a road trip along the California coast to get away from their respective life problems, but more complications set in when their money and clothes, including her wedding ring, get stolen from Naomi's car, which prompts them to venture to a seedy biker bar to find the culprits, where Adrianna hooks up with a good-natured young motorcyclist and Naomi ventures to visit her estranged mother. Meanwhile, Liam finds himself held captive by the deranged Ashley in the basement of Offshore who has plans to take him to Mexico, while Annie and Vanessa learn that Ashley is not who she says she is. Dixon prepares a party at Naomi's house to celebrate the opening of his new recording label. Megan tells Dixon that she feels that he is not over Adrianna due to him continuing to give her a hard time. However, in order to move on, Dixon decides to let go of his anger and not feel anything for Adrianna... and instead continues to burden her with more work. Elsewhere, Silver is still having problems with Teddy about the impregnation when he continues to want to be a part of her baby's life, while she wants to raise her child alone. Silver goes to Teddy's uncle to persuade him to drop his attempts to block her procedure, but when Teddy still will not back down, a row occurs which makes things worse for everyone. In desperation, Silver forges Teddy's signature on the donation form and makes an appointment to have the insemination done immediately. When Annie and Vanessa track Liam down and free him, a physical scuffle with Ashley occurs and Annie ends up getting shot.
103	11	"We're Not Not in Kansas Anymore"	Cherie Nowlan	Liz Phang	January 28, 2013	0.78
Annie, now in a coma and fighting for her life during surgery after being wounded, wakes up and finds herself in an alternate reality where she sees what life would be like if she and her family never moved to Beverly Hills. Annie discovers herself working as an actress in a summer stock theater in Kansas and engaged to her old high school boyfriend, Jason. Annie also learns that her parents would have gotten divorced anyway, but Dixon is living in California and is a successful rap star, but to her dismay, no longer keeps in touch with his family and is living a reckless life. Navid happens to be Dixon's manager and right-hand man who tries to keep Dixon under control to protect his image. Meanwhile, Naomi is a working as a real estate agent had she never won her trust fund back from sister, Jen. Naomi later becomes Teddy's girlfriend. Teddy is a successful pro tennis player, but has still never told anyone about his real sexual orientation. Adrianna is a successful actress and Hollywood's "bad girl", having never quit drinking, drugs or partying. Silver is a cynical Internet blog writer who isn't close to anyone and has her own website of writing dirt on celebrities. Liam is revealed to be attending college but has problems with delivering drugs for Dixon as to pay off a debt he owns to his old school rival Ty.
104	12	"Here Comes Honey Bye Bye"	Stuart Gillard	Liz Sczudlo	February 4, 2013	0.79
Naomi and Max seek the help of a marriage counselor, who advises Naomi to work on herself which leads her to plan a toddler's beauty pageant. After going on countless interviews, Max realizes that what he really wants to do with his life is attend a program at MIT. But Naomi doesn't want to move to Massachusetts. Instead of supporting each others dreams, their marriage is standing in the way. So they decide to part ways. Meanwhile, Megan reveals that can't afford to stay at CU for the next semester unless she gets a scholarship. She is too full of pride to accept financial help, and won't work for Dixon in spite if his insistence. So, Dixon goes behind her back and sets up an anonymous scholarship for her. But that plan backfires when Adrianna discovers that it was her hard earned money for Dixon's label that he used to fund the scholarship. Navid attempts to enroll at CU in order to pledge to be tapped by a secret society. Navid also learns that Teddy's embryos are Silver's one and only chance of having a baby, he goes to Teddy and demands that he let Silver have them. Reluctantly, Teddy agrees. But when Silver visits Teddy's lawyer, she realizes that there's a catch. Silver must find a surrogate mother, meaning she can't give birth to her own baby. Liam gets kicked out of a boxing gym because he sparred too violently as he continues to take out his anger and frustration over his kidnapping. Also, Annie learns that Riley is undergoing experimental back surgery in order to walk again. With Dixon's help, Annie rushes to the hospital in the hopes that she can stop him. When she arrives, the surgery is already complete. He seems perfectly healthy until later that night when Annie calls to check on him and learns that he suffered a blood clot in his lung and died.
105	13	"#realness"	Mike Listo	Chris Alberghini & Mike Chessler	February 11, 2013	0.66
Liam is offered a great movie role from a producer, but he has lost all interest in being famous. Still traumatized from being kidnapped by his stalker, he confronts a man sitting in a car outside of his house. The man was only looking for Annie to offer her a book deal about her risquė blog. Annie refuses to publish if it means revealing her identity. The publisher agrees she will remain anonymous. Meanwhile, Naomi and Max wish to divorce so that they can each live their own lives, but they are still in love. Their attraction is renewed when they work together on a charity event at the Hollywood Bowl. Despite Naomi's reticence, Max knows that a divorce is the best course. Trying to impress the Cronos Society, Navid picks up a pretty girl at a bar. They end up having a one-night stand, until Navid learns that the young woman named Michaela (Lyndon Smith), is wanting to be the surrogate mother for Silver and Teddy's baby. Liam is persuaded by Navid to continue to partake in the Cronos Society's illegal bare-knuckle fight club gatherings. Elsewhere, Adrianna, frustrated by Dixon's continuing cruel treatment of her, wishes to get out of her recording contract at any cost, even so far as to shoplift. When that fails, she strips at Naomi and Max's charity event to humiliate herself and Dixon. Unfortunately, Dixon has invited other agents who had agreed to take her as a client if she performed well. Liam, at Annie's suggestion, partakes in a celebrity flag-football tournament at the charity event in order to vent his emotions. After all goes well, Liam is suddenly thrust back into the spotlight. Alienated with producers and talent agents wanting to hire him (reminding him of the greedy and scheming Vanessa) and of the fans wanting his autograph (as with the case of his psychotic stalker Ashley), Liam runs away from it all and returns to the Cronos Society's underground fight club.
106	14	"Brother from Another Mother"	Benny Boom	Chris Atwood	February 18, 2013	0.55
Annie becomes somewhat angry at Naomi who has tracked down their real biological half-brother Mark (Charlie Weber), a local chef who owns a gourmet food truck and Naomi tries to institute herself into Mark's life by holding a CU Food Truck Cook-Off competition where Wolfgang Puck (guest starring as himself) is judging. Meanwhile, Liam experiences some symptoms of post-traumatic stress disorder while preparing to testify against Ashley, but he continues to refuse to talk about his feelings or deal with them. Navid falls further into the Cronos society's nefarious doings when he learns that Campbell runs a "cheaters club" in exchanging test answers to finals. Also, Silver becomes more overbearing with her surrogate Michaela who begins to resent being Silver's pampering. Blacklisted by the music industry, Adrianna is asked to substitute as a lead singer for a band in a Battle of the Bands competition at CU which Annie throws for Dixon who is looking for new fresh talent. Dixon later discovers that Michaela has an amazing singing voice.
107	15	"Strange Brew"	Bethany Rooney	Brian Dawson	February 25, 2013	0.58
Naomi tries to bond more with Mark as she helps him prepare for the opening of their own restaurant, but soon discovers that the preparation and cooking of food is more hectic than she imagined. Dixon persuades Michaela to join his record label as his new talented star and asks her to sing at Naomi and Mark's restaurant grand opening party. Meanwhile, Annie begins having romantic feelings for Liam once again as she continues to ghost write her life story, while at the same time Liam tries to brew his own type of beer which gets a negative reaction from everyone who drinks it. Elsewhere, Navid is asked by Campbell to escort his fiancée around where Navid accidentally discovers that Campbell is using Navid as a shield so he can cheat on her. Also, Silver and Adrianna decide to use Mark's old food truck as a documentary-on-wheels set where they try to interview random people with their life problems.
108	16	"Life's a Beach"	Michael Zinberg	Bill Brown	March 4, 2013	0.64
Liam decides to open his own custom surfboard shop for women, but things get complicated when he becomes romantically involved with his first investor; a wealthy young woman named Sydney (Melissa Ordway) who is later revealed to be married. Meanwhile, Naomi tries to convince Mark to stay in Los Angeles after he receives an offer to be head chef at a restaurant in New York, while Annie feels that Naomi is tying Mark down and plots a scheme to make him leave after learning that Mark has a meeting of minds with Adrianna. Elsewhere, Dixon convinces Silver to direct Michaela's first music video before she gets pregnant but they learn that the scheduling date for the video is on the day of Michaela's insemination appointment. Also, Navid tries to land a prestigious marketing job by trying to impress his uptight would-be employer, Brock Page (guest star Adam Kaufman).
109	17	"Dude, Where's My Husband?"	Matthew Diamond	Liz Phang	March 11, 2013	0.67
When Naomi is hired by a wealthy client to plan his wedding, Adrianna suggests they take a girls night out to forget their life problems which takes a sudden turn when (in a homage to Dude, Where's My Car? and The Hangover), Naomi wakes up the next day at her house with no memory of the night before and wearing a wedding dress. Naomi teams up with Adrianna (who now has blond streaks in her hair) and with Silver to retrace the events of the evening before as well as to look for a missing Annie. Silver breaks the pact she made with Adriana and sleeps with Mark. Meanwhile, Dixon (at Mark's suggestion) hooks up with a bar girl to move on only to find out he has feelings for Michaela, as they spend more time together. Elsewhere, Liam secretly discovers that Campbell (who is the stepson of Sydney) is plotting to frame Navid for the Cronos Society's cheating scam and he decides to socialize with the Cronos group to get close to them in order to find a way to clear Navid's name. At the end, Silver tells Adriana that she slept with Mark the night before. Adriana tells Silver she okay with it, but she really is not.
110	18	"A Portrait of the Artist As a Young Call Girl"	Bethany Rooney	Scott Weinger	April 15, 2013	0.55
Jordan (Robbie Jones) asks Naomi to plan a launch party for the latest hot writer, known as Author X, which forces Annie to admit her identity. Silver worries that Adrianna is not okay that she is dating Mark (Charlie Weber). Meanwhile, Dixon finds out that Michaela (Lyndon Smith) has feelings for Navid.
111	19	"The Empire State Strikes Back"	Stuart Gillard	Scott Weinger	April 22, 2013	0.49
Liam and Navid, in an effort to get teenage pro-surfer Cassie (Marie Avgeropoulos) to be their first sponsored athlete, ask her favorite musician Olly Murs to do a special performance. Meanwhile, Naomi travels to New York to make a good impression on Jordan's stern and judgmental mother, Cheryl (Robin Givens), with disastrous consequences. Annie tags along to New York to come out as the author of her best-selling novel about her life, but her old flame/client, Patrick, shows up and threatens her not to reveal her identity. Dixon learns about Annie's predicament and after confronting Patrick about his threats, he persuades Annie to tell the truth. Also, Silver goes to New York to follow Mark who tries to launch his own restaurant. Elsewhere, Navid and Adrianna decide to keep their one-night stand a secret.
112	20	"You Can't Win Em All"	Michael Zinberg	Patti Carr	April 29, 2013	0.55
When Mark gets arrested for drug possession, Naomi calls on Jordan for help in which he calls in a favor from his mother. But Cheryl's one condition is that Jordan must end things with Naomi. Meanwhile, Annie must deal with Liam's growing anger stemming after the fallout of Liam being in her book is made public. Michaela catches Navid and Adrianna during an intimate moment.
113	21	"Scandal Royale"	David Warren	Terrence Coli & Paul Sciarrotta	May 6, 2013	0.60
Naomi helps Jordan's sister out of a messy situation, and in turn makes a deal with his mom. Teddy comes back, after Dixon phones him to tell him that Michaela has gone missing, when they eventually find her she announces that she has had a miscarriage. Liam asks Annie to buy the Off Shore off him, so that he can leave to Australia with Sydney. Later Adrianna performs on stage after a performance from Fall Out Boy, but the night ends in disaster.
114	22	"We All Fall Down"	Harry Sinclair	Lara Olsen	May 13, 2013	0.51
Adrianna is stuck on the stage after an explosion so Navid decides to go and rescue her by himself but ends up in trouble after finding that her foot is trapped. Silver receives a phone call from her doctor who tells her she has cancer. Dixon shows his support and tells her she has to fight it. Naomi hosts a charity event, inviting Goo Goo Dolls. After a meeting with Jordan's mother, Naomi and Jordan are finally getting back together. Liam is having mixed feelings as he still feels something for Annie, but is not ready to move on. After confiding in Sydney, she tells him to read Annie's book and think about it. In the end as Annie joins Naomi and Jordan to go to Washington, D.C., Liam finds Jordan's plane and stops it with his motorcycle. The show comes to an end with Liam proposing to Annie as she accepts and Naomi spreads the word to the rest of the gang.

== Production ==
Season 5 main cast members from left to right, Navid, Silver, Adrianna, Dixon, Annie, Naomi, Liam.

On June 30, 2012, The CW released the first promotional ad for the fifth season. However, no new scenes featured in the 30 second ad, but rather recapped the final episode of season four. On August 23 at the 90210 launch party for season five, a new 30 second ad was released, showing brand new scenes of the upcoming season, including Justin Deeley's scenes. The CW then released another brand new promo for the fifth season on 11 of September, featuring more new scenes form the upcoming premiere, and brand new graphics for the shows promotional campaigns. On September 27, 2012, the cast and crew celebrated their 100th episode in Manhattan Beach, California.

=== Cast and characters ===
On May 22, 2012, Gillian Zinser's exit from the series was announced on TVLine. However, it was reported that Zinser will make guest appearances, although it is unclear for how many episodes. In spite of that news she never guest starred in the final season. On June 22, 2012, Riley Smith's casting as a romantic interest for Annie was announced. Arielle Kebbel is due back for at least a few episodes and Josh Zuckerman, who plays Max, is returning in a recurring role. Trevor Donovan will return in a recurring role as Teddy Montgomery for at least the three episodes of the season, including the 100th episode. It was also reported that he was going to be upped to a main cast member for the first time since season 3. In spite of this, he only came back as a guest star for only two episodes out of the whole final season. On July 6, 2012, Justin Deeley's exit from the show was announced after he was written out of the season premiere, although a rep says the "door is still open for him to reappear in future episodes." Adam Gregory reprises his role of Ty Collins in the special "what if" episode set to air in late January marking his comeback to the show after four seasons. On July 9, 2012, it was announced that Carly Rae Jepsen would guest star as herself in the season premiere. On July 11, 2012, Wes Brown and Trai Byers were announced to play the roles of Taylor, a club promoter, and Alec, Max's business partner, both in recurring roles. On July 18, 2012 Lori Loughlin was announced to return as Debbie Wilson for the season premiere. On August 1, 2012, it was announced that Lindsey McKeon would play Suzanne in a recurring role, as well as rapper Sam Adams to guest star as himself in an October episode. Jessica Parker Kennedy was cast in the recurring role of Megan, "a girl next door who tells her story in group therapy." On August 3, 2012, it was announced Jason Thompson would guest star as Eugene Thompsen. On August 14, 2012, it was announced that Olympics swimmer Ryan Lochte would guest star as himself. On August 22, 2012, it was revealed that Carmen Electra would appear as a recurring guest star, in an episode set to air in November, and will return again in the 100th episode later on in the season. On August 23, 2012, E! Online reported that Nelly Furtado would be make a guest appearance as herself. It was also reported that she would be performing a new song from her upcoming album. On August 24, 2012, it was announced that Denise Richards would have a cameo in the 100th episode as wealthy socialite Gwen. On 8 September 2012, Zap2it announced that Amber Stevens would guest star as Bryce, an attractive and highly intelligent applicant to work at Max's company. Stevens will make her debut in November. On September 12, 2012, it was revealed that R&B singer Ne-Yo would guest star as himself in an episode scheduled to air in November. On September 17, 2012, it was revealed that former Parks and Recreation's star, Natalie Morales, would play Ashley - a woman who heads up a professional security detail - in a recurring role. She will make her on-screen debut in episode 7. On September 21, 2012, founder and editor-in-chief of JustJared.com, Jared Eng, was announced to have a cameo appearance as himself in an episode due to air in November. On September 25, 2012, TV Guide revealed that British singer Taio Cruz would guest star as himself in the 100th episode due to air in November. On October 4, 2012, TVLine announced that Canadian cult-fave group, Tegan and Sara, would guest stars as themselves in an festive episode due to air in December. On October 6, 2012, Perez Hilton revealed that British pop star Rita Ora would be appearing as herself in an episode due in air in January 2013. On October 15, it was announced that Zachary Ray Sherman and Abbie Cobb will come back for the 100th episode and reprise their role of Jasper and Emily, respectively. This also marks Jasper's comeback after disappearing since the season 2 finale. On October 29, 2012, it was revealed that Glee star Grant Gustin would play Campbell, a charming and good-looking college student from a wealthy and privileged background and would appear in multiple episodes. On November 12, 2012, it was announced that Joey McIntyre from New Kids on the Block, would guest star in an episode due to air in February 2013, playing an up-and-coming music manager who had some business with Dixon. On November 13, 2012, it was announced that Lyndon Smith would play Michaela, a "free-spirited" and incredibly talented singer who has a connection to one of the regular characters, in a recurring role for six to nine episodes.

On January 16, 2013, it was revealed that Olly Murs would guest star as himself and perform his tracks "Troublemaker" and "Right Place Right Time" in an episode slated to air in April. On February 19, 2013, it was reported that former One Tree Hill and Hellcats star Robbie Jones would appear in the show as a guest star playing Jordan.

== Ratings ==
90210 opened with 0.94 viewers in its season premiere and scored a 0.4 in the demo. Episode two, however, was up 50 percent to 0.6, while rising 14 percent in total audience by hitting 1.1 million viewers. 90210 was down 10 and 33 percent, only managing 950,000 viewers and 0.4 rating in the 18-49 demographic. However, DVR ratings for episode 3 were up by 75% of three-tenths of a point from the original 0.4 to a 0.7. Though 90210 began to slip in further in viewers (850,000) during episode 4, it managed to remain stable with a 0.4. demo. Episode 5 saw a sharp rise and season high with viewers by reaching 1.16 million, as well as a sharp rise in the demo to a 0.6 up 50% from last week's 0.4 Episode 6 hit a .4 in the demo while hitting a series low in viewership with 780,000 viewers. By episode 7, 90210 seemed to have gained some audience back by reaching a .5 in the demo with 1.03 million viewers. Episode 8 stabilized at .5 in the demo but added ten thousand viewers reaching 1.04 million. The mid-season finale saw another rise in the demo garnering a .6 as well as 1.16 million live viewers tuning in. Episode 10 was down two tenths from the mid-season finale with a 0.4 in the demo while managing 790,000 live viewers. This episode also rose two tenths in DVR numbers garnering a 0.6 in the demo. Episode 11 maintained the 0.4 score in the 18-49 demographic but lost a mere ten thousand viewers averaging 780,000 live viewers. Episode 12 held onto the 0.4 demo rating and added 10,000 viewers averaging 790,000 for the night. Episode 13 hit lows in the key demo, sinking to a 0.3 and a low in viewership with 660,000 viewers. The following episode hit another low with a 0.2 in the demo grabbing 550,000 viewers. Episode 15 rose in the ratings reaching 0.3 in the demo and added 8,000 viewers for 558,000. The 18-49 rating remained the same for episode 16 with a 0.3 but rose in viewership to 664,000. The series finale, aired on May 13, 2013, scored 510,000 viewers and 0.2 in the demo 18–49, making it the least-watched finale of a CW show ever (Cult later broke the record a few months later). The retrospective, aired the same day before the finale, scored 570,000 viewers and 0.2 in the demo.

== Reception ==
=== Critical reception ===
Zap2it thought that Teddy and Silver having a baby together is a "weird thing to happen, but we're not complaining about anything that means we'll have Trevor Donovan on our TV screens for an undetermined amount of episodes." TV Equals's, Kristen Elizabeth thought that Dixon had become unnecessary; "I just feel like he's superfluous at this point." She also predicted Naomi will sleep with Max's business partner, Alec; "Sorry, it's nothing personal. Girl just has a bad track record."
The Series finale, "We All Fall Down", marks the end of the show with mixed feelings from both critics and fans, and the cast. This was because of the notice the show was ending late in the shooting of the episode (planned as a Season finale), and the showrunners had little time to re-elaborate the storylines. Particularly, the un-satisfying ending for the character of Silver led to a serious backlash from fans and critics for the little resolution of the character after losing the baby and getting the news of cancer right in the middle of the episode. This was because Jessica Stroup already shot the entire Silver's act, with the writers unable to re-write her story. Later, Lara Olsen, showrunner for the final two years of the show, explained that "in a perfect world, we wanted Silver to find out Michaela lost her baby [...], then that she was pregnant with Mark's baby, and not with cancer." The same fate goes for AnnaLynne McCord's character, Naomi Clark. The actress, disappointed with how the series was ending for the character she portrayed for five seasons, decided to shoot her own ending as a thank you to the fans posting the video on YouTube a few minutes after the finale was aired. Matt Lanter (Liam), also speculated on the hypothetical and final sixth season that was promised but never got, saying that "we had a whole different [season finale] planned. We aged our characters five years in the potential sixth season. Liam had just gotten out of jail, and Naomi was on a private jet flying back to pick him up. She got him out of jail and said, "Officer, I'm here to pick up my husband, Liam Court," and I walked up to her and said something like, "Hello, Mrs. Court" and it actually ended right there."

Critics also reviewed negatively the writing of the past two seasons, particularly, The A.V. Club noted how the tone of the series shifted in the final two seasons (with the transition from showrunner Rebecca Sinclair at the end of season 3 to Patti Carr and Lara Olsen), saying "The first few seasons had fitfully entertaining moments—Annie's hit-and-run homicide, Teddy's coming out story, and Adrianna's descent into absolute narcissism and madness were standouts—and the third season chronicling the characters' senior year was actually a highly enjoyable lark, as the show finally figured out it could have a little bit of fun amid the constant misery. But then the cast graduated, and that's when everything just went to hell." It went on criticizing the lack of resolution for Silver, adding: "[Her] quest to have a child before she is stricken by the breast cancer that's inevitably coming to kill her (I know), was the one thing that wasn't wrapped up at all. Silver's surrogate lost her baby last week, which is tragic, and in the finale, she learns that on top of that, her potential cancer has turned into a full-blown malignancy. Will Silver die? Who knows, because there just isn't time to find out. The majority of the finale dealt with giving anyone who wasn't Silver a happy ending, which is nice fan service but not all that interesting." They also questioned if the fan-service reuniting the core couples from previous seasons was a smart move, "I suppose, if you are one of those people who are still shipping yourself with whomever you had a crush on in high school. More egregiously, the finale acts like Annie and Liam is the ultimate endgame for the show, the couple fans are most interested in, to which I say "Really?" Are people so invested in this couple who haven't spent significant time dating since season three? Are they so invested that the big ending of Liam chasing down a plane with his motorcycle in order to propose to Annie is how they wanted this to finish up?" On TVFanatic and Zap2it were more positive about it, noting the writers didn't have time to wrap things up.

== DVD release ==
The DVD release of season five was released after the season has completed broadcast on television. It has been released in Regions 1, 2 and 4. As well as every episode from the season, the DVD release features bonus material such as deleted scenes, gag reels and behind-the-scenes featurettes.

90210: The Final Season
Set details			Special features
22 episodes; 990 minutes (Region 1); 870 minutes (Region 2); 877 (Region 4); 5-disc set; 1.85:1 aspect ratio; Languages: English (Dolby Digital 2.0 Surround); Subtitles: English, Spanish and Portuguese (Region 1); English, Arabic, Dutch, Norwegian, Swedish, English For The Hearing Impaired (Regions 2 and 4)			Audio commentaries: Commentary on the 100th episode 902-100 Featuring cast members: Jessica Stroup, Matt Lanter, Tristan Wilds, Michael Steger and Scott Weinger.; Set Tours: Silver's Apartment - Offshore Renovated; Casting 90210; Script to Screen: Creating an Episode; Season in Review: The Last Chapter; 90210 4EVER Retrospective; Gag Reel; Deleted Scenes
Release dates			Audio commentaries: Commentary on the 100th episode 902-100 Featuring cast members: Jessica Stroup, Matt Lanter, Tristan Wilds, Michael Steger and Scott Weinger.; Set Tours: Silver's Apartment - Offshore Renovated; Casting 90210; Script to Screen: Creating an Episode; Season in Review: The Last Chapter; 90210 4EVER Retrospective; Gag Reel; Deleted Scenes
United States	United Kingdom	Australia	Audio commentaries: Commentary on the 100th episode 902-100 Featuring cast members: Jessica Stroup, Matt Lanter, Tristan Wilds, Michael Steger and Scott Weinger.; Set Tours: Silver's Apartment - Offshore Renovated; Casting 90210; Script to Screen: Creating an Episode; Season in Review: The Last Chapter; 90210 4EVER Retrospective; Gag Reel; Deleted Scenes
October 8, 2013	October 14, 2013	March 5, 2014	Audio commentaries: Commentary on the 100th episode 902-100 Featuring cast members: Jessica Stroup, Matt Lanter, Tristan Wilds, Michael Steger and Scott Weinger.; Set Tours: Silver's Apartment - Offshore Renovated; Casting 90210; Script to Screen: Creating an Episode; Season in Review: The Last Chapter; 90210 4EVER Retrospective; Gag Reel; Deleted Scenes

== References to other works ==
The episode titles reference many other popular works.

- Episode 11: "We're Not Not In Kansas Anymore" is a reference to both the pilot episode title "We're Not In Kansas Anymore" and Dorothy's same line from The Wizard of Oz.
- Episode 12: "Here Comes Honey Bye Bye" is a reference to the reality TV show Here Comes Honey Boo Boo,
- Episode 18: "A Portrait of the Artist As a Young Call Girl" is a reference to James Joyce's novel A Portrait of the Artist as a Young Man.
- Episode 19: "The Empire State Strikes Back" is a reference to Star Wars Episode V: The Empire Strikes Back.
- Episode 21: "Scandal Royale" is a reference to the James Bond film Casino Royale.
