= Inner Ninja =

2012 single by Classified featuring David Myles

Single by Classified featuring David Myles

from the album Classified
- Released: 6 November 2012 (original version)
- Recorded: 2012
- Genre: Hip hop
- Length: 3:11
- Label: Halflife Records, Universal Canada
- Songwriters: David Myles, Luke Boyd, Jack Artzy, Mark Pellizzer, Mike Boyd
- Producer: Luke Boyd

Classified singles chronology
"Anything Goes" (2012)	"Inner Ninja" (2012)	"3 Foot Tall" (2013)

David Myles singles chronology
"Inner Ninja" (2012)

Music video
- "Inner Ninja" on YouTube

"Inner Ninja" is a song by Canadian hip hop recording artist Classified, featuring David Myles. It was released in November 2012 as the lead single from his album, Classified. The song reached number 5 in Canada and was certified 5× platinum. The organizers of the 2015 Pan American Games licensed "Inner Ninja" to serve as the theme song for Pachi the porcupine, the Games' sports mascot.

== Music videos ==
The original version of the video shows two men taking a bag of sweets from a young boy who then turns into a ninja and chases after them. The boy and two other children dressed as ninjas finally catch up with the men and defeat them and reclaim the bag of sweets. Throughout the video it also shows Classified and Myles singing next to a group of children learning martial arts.

== Classified featuring Olly Murs remix version ==
"Inner Ninja"

Single by Classified featuring Olly Murs
- Released: 10 November 2013
- Recorded: 2013
- Genre: Hip hop
- Length: 3:11
- Label: Halflife Records, Atlantic
- Songwriters: David Myles, Luke Boyd, Mark Pellizzer, Mike Boyd
- Producer: Luke Boyd

Classified singles chronology
"3 Foot Tall" (2013)	"Inner Ninja" (2013)

Olly Murs singles chronology
"Right Place Right Time" (2013)	"Inner Ninja (Remix)" (2013)	"Hand on Heart" (2013)

Music video
- "Inner Ninja (Remix)" on YouTube

On 10 November 2013, a new version of the song was released, this time featuring vocals from English singer Olly Murs. This version has charted in Australia, Ireland and New Zealand.

Music video

The second video which was released on 30 September 2013 is similar to the first except it features clips of Murs dressed in black clothing in a Japanese-themed room.

== Charts and certifications ==
=== Weekly charts ===
Classified featuring David Myles version

Chart (2012–13)	Peak position
Canada Hot 100 (Billboard)	5
Canada CHR/Top 40 (Billboard)	6
Canada Hot AC (Billboard)	17
Netherlands (Single Top 100)	91

Classified featuring Olly Murs remix version

Chart (2013)	Peak position
Australia (ARIA)	60
Australia Hitseekers (ARIA)	1
Ireland (IRMA)	37
New Zealand (Recorded Music NZ)	33

=== Year-end charts ===
Chart (2013)	Position
Canada (Canadian Hot 100)	17

=== Certifications ===
Region	Certification	Certified units/sales
Canada (Music Canada)	6× Platinum	357,000
