= Army of Two (Olly Murs song) =

Single by Olly Murs

from the album Right Place Right Time
- Released: 10 March 2013
- Recorded: 2012
- Genre: Pop
- Length: 4:47
- Label: Epic
- Songwriters: Olly Murs; Wayne Hector; Iyiola Babalola; Darren Lewis
- Producer: Future Cut

Olly Murs singles chronology
"Troublemaker" (2012)	"Army of Two" (2013)	"Dear Darlin'" (2013)

"Army of Two" is a song by English recording artist Olly Murs, from his third studio album, Right Place Right Time (2012). The song was released as the second single from the album on 10 March 2013. "Army of Two" was co-written by Murs, Wayne Hector, Iyiola Babalola, Darren Lewis and was produced by Future Cut.

== Background ==
"Army of Two" is the opening track on Right Place Right Time, and in its original form on the album is almost five minutes in length. The radio mix of the single is about a minute shorter, with a more condensed sounding ending than the album version. Murs wrote the song as a tribute to his fans, who he affectionately refers to as the 'Murs Army' (hence the title of the song). It also served as the opening song on his UK and Ireland arena tour for the album in March 2013.

Speaking about the song, he said he was influenced by both Take That and Coldplay whilst writing it, saying, 'I wanted to write a song about my fans that have been amazing to me through the last three years ... it felt amazing writing this song, and I can't wait to sing it live!'

At the album's launch party in November 2012, Murs said that the song had actually been intended to be released as the first single from the album in August that year, with "Troublemaker" following in November, however this was scrapped due to his international promotion commitments in Europe and America.

On 22 February 2013, to tie in with promotion of the single, Murs launched an application on his Facebook page inviting fans to become members of the 'Olly Murs Army'. On submitting their details via the application, fans are given an official 'Murs Army' membership ID and a certificate pledging their oath as a fan of Murs. The membership IDs from registered fans were subsequently used in a fan video of the song that can be found on Murs' YouTube account.

== Critical reception ==
"Army of Two" was one of the three songs that was previewed prior to the album's release. Robert Copsey of Digital Spy gave the song a positive review commenting, "the whole thing is extremely well crafted." He furthered praised the song's chorus for its "instantly catchy lyric." He ended his review writing, "It's probably our favourite of the five tracks we've heard because it feels big, fresh and exciting without taking away what we already like about Olly's music." 4Music's Trent Maynard also complimented the song's chorus and compared it with songs of Maroon 5. John Aizlewood of BBC Music described the song as a "pop thumper of the highest order." Matthew Horton of Virgin Media wrote that "Opener 'Army Of Two' is astonishing, an epic cousin to Tears for Fears' Beatles pastiche 'Sowing the Seeds of Love', and it actually works." Yahoo! contributor Chris Smith wrote that "Olly can indeed pull off big ballads when doing them on his own terms." Fiona Sheperd of The Scotsman commented that the song is a "solid but uninspiring stomping pop song Williams could have done with on his new album."

== Chart performance ==
"Army of Two" made its first chart appearance on the Irish Singles Chart on 7 February 2013 at number 93, based solely on sales of the download from the album. It climbed to number 43 in its second week, then to another new peak of #23 in its third week. It then debuted on the UK Singles Chart at number 89 on 17 February 2013, again, based solely on downloads from the album. The following week it climbed to a new peak of number 23, and then again the week after to #19, and is now Murs' eighth UK top 20 single in three years. Its current peak as of March 2013 is now #12. The song has also performed well on the UK radio airplay chart, becoming Murs' fourth #1 airplay hit. The song is now also Murs' second top 20 hit in Australia, having peaked at #19 in April 2013.

== Music video ==
The official music video was premiered on Valentine's Day 2013 on Murs' official Vevo account. It was directed by Vaughan Arnell and post production handled by Framestore. The music video is set in an underground car park in ExCeL London. Murs opens the video walking alone in the set, before slowly being joined by more and more clones of himself. The clones perform alongside Murs while marching to the song's chorus. The video ends with the clones beginning to leave before Murs goes back the way he came. Throughout the video Murs is wearing "a smart tweeted waistcoat and black turtle-neck top."

Murs has said that he got the idea for the video from the video to George Michael and Mary J. Blige's version of As.

== Live performances ==
On 4 February, Murs uploaded a live performance of "Army of Two" to his official Vevo account. He was backed "with violins, guitars, drums and dancing backing singers to boot." Chris Younie of 4Music liked the performance commenting, "with his cheeky-chops smile and ever so tight trousers making a return into our lives, our day just brightened up considerably." The performance is included on the deluxe edition of Right Place Right Time, on the second disc. Murs performed the song on the seventh live show of the eighth series of Dancing on Ice, The Graham Norton Show and This Morning.

== Track listing ==
Digital download
No.	Title	Length
1.	"Army of Two"	4:48

Digital EP
No.	Title	Length
1.	"Army of Two" (Radio Edit)	3:45
2.	"Army of Two" (Westfunk & Steve Smart Remix)	5:18
3.	"Army of Two" (Kat Krazy Remix)	4:58
4.	"Army of Two" (Live Version)	4:33

CD single
No.	Title	Length
1.	"Army of Two" (Radio Edit)	3:45
2.	"Army of Two" (Westfunk & Steve Smart Remix)	5:18

== Charts ==
=== Weekly charts ===
Chart (2013)	Peak position
Australia (ARIA)	19
Austria (Ö3 Austria Top 40)	27
Belgium (Ultratip Bubbling Under Flanders)	28
Czech Republic Airplay (ČNS IFPI)	88
Germany (GfK)	96
Ireland (IRMA)	18
New Zealand (Recorded Music NZ)	13
Scotland Singles (OCC)	10
Slovakia Airplay (ČNS IFPI)	59
UK Singles (OCC)	12

=== Year-end charts ===
Chart (2013)	Position
UK Singles (OCC)	108

== Certifications ==
Region	Certification	Certified units/sales
Australia (ARIA)	Platinum	70,000^{^}
New Zealand (RMNZ)	Gold	7,500^{*}
United Kingdom (BPI)	Silver	200,000^{‡}
^{*} Sales figures based on certification alone.^{^} Shipments figures based on certification alone.^{‡} Sales+streaming figures based on certification alone.

== Radio and release history ==
Country	Date	Format	Label
United Kingdom	10 March 2013	Impact day	Epic Records
Germany	7 June 2013	CD single	Epic Records
