= Pachi, Kerman =

Coordinates: 25°43′55″N 59°41′29″E

Pachi پچي
- Village
- Interactive map of Pachi
- Country: Iran
- Province: Kerman
- County: Rigan
- Bakhsh: Central
- Rural District: Gavkan

Population (2006)
  - Total: 40
- Time zone: UTC+3:30 (IRST)
  - Summer (DST): UTC+4:30 (IRDT)

Pachi (Persian: پچي, also Romanized as Pachī) is a village in Gavkan Rural District, in the Central District of Rigan County, Kerman Province, Iran. At the 2006 census, its population was 40, in 7 families.
