= Dear Darlin' =

Single by Olly Murs

from the album Right Place Right Time
- Released: 26 May 2013
- Genre: Pop
- Length: 3:25
- Label: Epic
- Songwriters: Olly Murs; Ed Drewett; Jim Eliot; Paul Flowers
- Producers: Ed Drewett; Jim Eliot

Olly Murs singles chronology
"Army of Two" (2013)	"Dear Darlin'" (2013)	"Right Place Right Time" (2013)

"Dear Darlin'" is a song by English recording artist Olly Murs, from his third studio album, Right Place Right Time (2012). The song was released as the third single from the album on 26 May 2013. It was co-written by Murs, Paul Flowers, Ed Drewett and Jim Eliot. Drewett and Eliot also co-produced the song. No further works by Paul Flowers are known.

The song reached number five on the UK Singles Chart. On 2 September 2013, Murs released a new version of the song for its release in France which featured French vocals from singer Alizée, and was later included on the Special Edition of the album.

== Background ==
On 18 April 2013, Murs revealed via Twitter that "Dear Darlin'" would be the third single released from Right Place Right Time.

"Dear Darlin'" was co-written by Murs, Ed Drewett and Jim Eliot. Of the track, Murs said: "Writing with Ed and him being my friend helped, as we sat there for hours before writing, going over old relationships and recalling their scenarios. It's about writing to someone to tell them how I feel about losing someone. It's not the kind of song you'd expect me and Ed to write, as we're bubbly characters, but we were able to open up to each other."

Murs has said that the song was inspired by Eminem's song "Stan".

== Critical reception ==
"Dear Darlin'" was one of the three songs that was previewed prior to the album's release. Robert Copsey of Digital Spy gave the song a positive review commenting, "it's reassuringly familiar without feeling dated." He ended his review writing, "There are Christmassy chimes to be heard throughout, so we wouldn't be surprised if this is the next pre-Christmas single."

== Chart performance ==
The song reached number 196 on the UK Singles Chart, with downloads from the album only. After the premiere of the song's video, further album-only downloads helped the song to reach a peak of number 18, before it then climbed the following week to number 9, then to #6, and then finally to its current peak of #5, becoming Murs' ninth UK top 20 hit overall and his first single (aside from his number ones) from an album to reach the top 10 since "Thinking of Me" in 2010.

The song has so far reached a peak of #8 in the Irish Charts, #4 on the Australian Charts and #29 on the New Zealand Charts. The song peaked number one in Austria, marking his first number one there and it also peaked number two in Germany.

== Music video ==
On 18 April 2013, Murs tweeted that the music video would be shot the following week in Los Angeles. It was shown on Murs' Vevo channel on 13 May. It shows Murs thinking about when he and his girlfriend (played by model Jessica Cook) moved into their new home and later after a falling out the girl moves out. It then shows Murs and the girl walking around the town with the girl been given a coffee saying 'I ♥ You' in it, then walking by a busker playing the guitar with a cardboard sign saying 'I Miss You' next to him. She is later seen walking by a wall saying "These Arms Are Yours To Hold" and is last seen writing 'Dear Olly, I Miss You Too' in a notebook before ripping the page out and scrunching it up whilst Murs is seen on top of a tower.

== Live performances ==
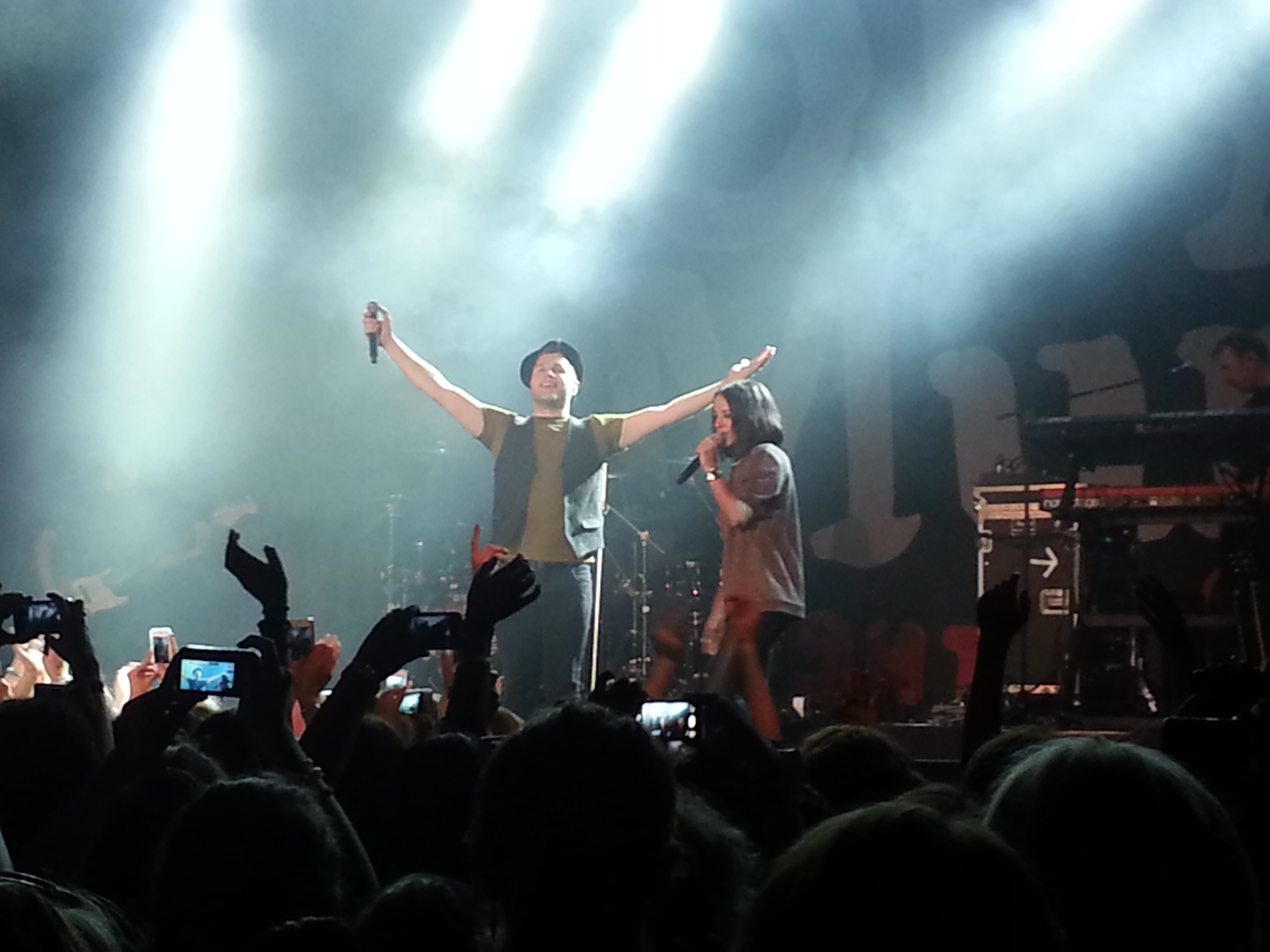
Olly Murs and Alizée singing the French version of Dear Darlin’ – Le Trianon, Paris, 2013.

Murs' first live performances of the song were during promotion of the Right Place Right Time album at the end of 2012, when he performed it acoustically for the ninth series of The Xtra Factor and This Morning. It was subsequently performed on his UK and Ireland arena tour for the album in March 2013. In May 2013, he was briefly interviewed and performed the song on Alan Carr: Chatty Man, and as part of his set on the final day of BBC Radio 1's Big Weekend in Derry. The song was also performed at the 2013 Royal Variety Performance.

== Track listing ==
Digital EP
No.	Title	Length
1.	"Dear Darlin'" (Single Mix)	3:26
2.	"Don't You Worry Child" (BBC Radio 1 Live Lounge)	3:39
3.	"Dear Darlin'" (Live from The O2 – video)	3:38

France single
No.	Title	Length
1.	"Dear Darlin'" (featuring Alizée)	3:27

== Charts ==
=== Weekly charts ===
Chart (2013)	Peak position
Australia (ARIA)	4
Austria (Ö3 Austria Top 40)	1
Belgium (Ultratip Bubbling Under Flanders)	63
Czech Republic Airplay (ČNS IFPI)	7
France (SNEP)	127
Germany (GfK)	2
Greece (IFPI)	4
Iceland (Tónlist)	2
Ireland (IRMA)	8
Lebanon (The Official Lebanese Top 20)	2
Luxembourg Digital Songs (Billboard)	1
New Zealand (Recorded Music NZ)	29
Poland Airplay (ZPAV)	10
Romania (Airplay 100)	27
Scotland Singles (OCC)	4
Slovakia Airplay (ČNS IFPI)	28
Slovenia (SloTop50)	6
Sweden (Sverigetopplistan)	38
Switzerland (Schweizer Hitparade)	5
UK Singles (OCC)	5

=== Year-end charts ===
Chart (2013)	Position
Australia (ARIA)	64
Austria (Ö3 Austria Top 40)	26
Germany (Media Control AG)	20
Slovenia (SloTop50)	31
Switzerland (Schweizer Hitparade)	52
UK Singles (Official Charts Company)	20

Chart (2014)	Position
Slovenia (SloTop50)	37

== Certifications ==
Region	Certification	Certified units/sales
Australia (ARIA)	2× Platinum	140,000^{^}
Austria (IFPI Austria)	Gold	15,000^{*}
Germany (BVMI)	Platinum	300,000^{^}
New Zealand (RMNZ)	Gold	7,500^{*}
Sweden (GLF)	Gold	20,000^{‡}
Switzerland (IFPI Switzerland)	Platinum	30,000^{^}
United Kingdom (BPI)	Platinum	701,000
Streaming
Denmark (IFPI Danmark)	Gold	900,000^{†}
^{*} Sales figures based on certification alone.^{^} Shipments figures based on certification alone.^{‡} Sales+streaming figures based on certification alone.^{†} Streaming-only figures based on certification alone.
