= Right Place Right Time (album) =

2012 studio album by Olly Murs

Studio album by Olly Murs
- Released: 23 November 2012
- Recorded: 2012
- Genre: Pop
- Length: 41:04 (UK edition); 34:35 (US edition)
- Labels: Syco; Epic
- Producers: Julian Bunetta; Ed Drewett; Jim Eliot; Andrew Frampton; Future Cut; The Fearless; Chuck Harmony; Wayne Hector; Claude Kelly; Steve Kipner; Steve Robson; John Ryan; Lucas Secon; TMS

Olly Murs chronology
In Case You Didn't Know (2011)	Right Place Right Time (2012)	Never Been Better (2014)

Singles from Right Place Right Time
- 1. "Troublemaker" Released: 12 October 2012; 2. "Army of Two" Released: 10 March 2013; 3. "Dear Darlin'" Released: 26 May 2013; 4. "Right Place Right Time" Released: 23 August 2013; 5. "Hand on Heart" Released: 24 November 2013

Singles from Right Place Right Time (US version)
- 1. "Heart Skips a Beat" Released: 29 May 2012; 2. "Troublemaker" Released: 8 January 2013; 3. "Dance with Me Tonight" Released: 20 August 2013

Right Place Right Time is the third studio album by English recording artist Olly Murs. It was first released on 23 November 2012, by Epic Records. The album received mostly mixed and positive reviews from critics, most of whom called it catchy but predictable and said that the songs were nothing memorable. The album was also criticised for sounding too similar to Murs's previous album, In Case You Didn't Know (2011).

Right Place Right Time debuted at number one on the UK Albums Chart with first-week sales of 127,000 units. The album has been certified quintuple platinum by the British Phonographic Industry. The album reached the top-five in Austria and the Republic of Ireland while achieving top-twenty positions in Australia, Canada, and the United States becoming his most successful album to date.

The album spawned five singles. The lead single from the album, "Troublemaker", which features vocals from American rapper Flo Rida, debuted and spent two weeks at number one on the UK Singles Chart, becoming his most successful single to date. "Army of Two", was released as the album's second single achieving moderate success. "Dear Darlin'", became Murs' first UK top 10 hit (aside from his number ones) since "Thinking of Me" in 2010, peaking at number 5. The title track was released on 23 August as album's fifth single. A special edition version which featured a DVD of the tour was released on 25 November 2013. Murs re-released the album under the title, Right Place Right Time: Special Edition on 24 November, preceded by the release of new single "Hand on Heart".

== Background and development ==
Murs began writing and recording his third studio album in March 2012, in both the United Kingdom and the United States. He initially began writing with Claude Kelly and Steve Robson, with whom he had also worked with on his previous hits "Please Don't Let Me Go" and "Dance with Me Tonight", and later collaborated with writers Ed Drewett and Wayne Hector, as well as working with Steve Kipner, Andrew Frampton, Lucas Secon and production teams, Future Cut and TMS.

The artwork for the album was confirmed on 28 September 2012, whilst the track listing was revealed on 1 October.

== Release ==
The album was released in a variety of different formats. The two most prominent ones were the standard, 12 track edition of the album and the deluxe edition of the album, containing a red font for the logo rather than the standard edition's black on the artwork, a second disc of four bonus tracks and live recordings of "Troublemaker" and "Army of Two", and a 20-page booklet. On both the iTunes editions of the album, the pre-order only exclusive track "Just for Tonight" was featured, whilst the deluxe edition also carried live performance videos of 'Troublemaker' and 'Army of Two' along with a two part, track by track video documentary with Murs on the making of the album. Amazon.co.uk offered two free downloads of the Wideboys club mix of "Troublemaker" and the Thomas Gandey (aka 'Cagedbaby') remix of Right Place Right Time for a limited time. Play.com sold signed copies of the standard edition of the album, and Sainsbury's sold the standard edition with an exclusive slipcase, both for a limited time. Murs' official webstore also sold a limited 'super deluxe' boxset version, containing the two disc deluxe edition of the album, a large fold out poster, and a personalised lyric book (featuring exclusive pictures and hand written thoughts from Murs about the songs) housed in a collectible presentation box with the 'OM' trilby hat logo that appears on much of his official merchandise. The standard 12 track edition was also available to buy as a personalised album on the website MixPixie, with the option to incorporate a customised message and photo onto the artwork.

The album will serve as Murs' first North American release, being released in the country through Sony Music Entertainment on 16 April 2013. His first North American release was originally due to be an alternative edition of his second album, In Case You Didn't Know in September 2012, but the release was cancelled, and replaced with Right Place Right Time. The American edition will be a mixture of seven tracks from the album, along with "Heart Skips a Beat" (featuring Chiddy Bang in place of Rizzle Kicks), "Dance with Me Tonight" and "Oh My Goodness" from In Case You Didn't Know. It was initially due for release in the U.S. on 4 December 2012, but it was pushed back first to 9 April, and then one week later, to its final release date of 16 April.

In September 2013 Murs confirmed on his Twitter account that he would release a special edition of Right Place Right Time on 25 November 2013. On 7 October the artwork for the album was released with extra tracks and it was also revealed to contain a DVD of the tour.

== Composition ==
As with his previous two albums, Murs stated that he wanted to evolve his sound again, this time taking on a more funk-led influence from artists such as Jamiroquai and Maroon 5: "I hate saying the music is more 'mature', because I haven’t changed. But I feel my songwriting is stronger and I knew where I wanted to go as an artist with this album. I’ve tried to make some songs anthemic, and I hope it will open me up to a wider audience. I don’t want to do the same style on every album. I’d always said I want to do a Motown album, but after a couple of songs I’ll go 'Let’s change it up'." Of the album's title, he added: "Right Place Right Time as a title sums up my career to this point. I’ve worked hard in everything I’ve done, doing what's felt right, and everything has fit into place. It's the sentiment for this album – a body of work of great pop songs. And I’ve gone in a different place again this time."

== Promotion ==
=== Singles ===
On 17 September 2012, Murs announced via Twitter that the lead single from the album would be "Troublemaker", which features vocals from American rapper Flo Rida. It was released by Epic Records on 18 November 2012 and debuted at number one on the UK Singles Chart the following week, beating Girls Aloud's comeback single "Something New", which charted at number two. It remained atop the charts on 2 December, before slipping to number three on 9 December, behind Bruno Mars's "Locked Out of Heaven" (#2) and Gabrielle Aplin's cover of "The Power of Love" (#1). It then fell to number five in its fourth week. Troublemaker is Murs highest-peaking single on the Billboard Hot 100, currently peaking at number 30. It has also been certified Gold by RIAA, for shipments of over 500,000 copies.

On 18 April 2013 a press release revealed that "Dear Darlin'" will be released as the third single on 7 June 2013.

A new version of "Heart Skips a Beat, featuring Chiddy Bang was released as third official single in the US on 29 May 2013.

On 19 July 2013 Murs revealed on Twitter that the fourth single to be released from the album would be the title track "Right Place Right Time" and also revealed the single's artwork.

"Dance with Me Tonight" was released as the fourth official single in the US on 6 August 2013.

On 7 October 2013 it was revealed that "Hand on Heart" would be the next single, making this the fifth single from the album (excluding the US release "Dance with Me Tonight"). The song was released on 24 November 2013 a day before the release of the special edition of the album.

=== Live performances ===
Two days after performing "Troublemaker" for the first time on UK television at the live results show of The X Factor, Murs launched the album at his record company offices in London on 21 November 2012, with a special listening party for the album, featuring specially invited competition winners that was broadcast on his Ustream account, and hosted by Capital FM breakfast show DJ, Dave Berry. He answered questions from fans submitted to him on Twitter, and questions from the invited fans, previewed some songs off the album and performed "Troublemaker" and "What a Buzz" acoustically. As well as promoting "Troublemaker" with appearances on This Morning, Daybreak, Sunday Brunch, Match of the Day Kickabout and Surprise Surprise, he also performed an acoustic version of "Dear Darlin" on the 25 November edition of The Xtra Factor. He also performed it again acoustically on This Morning on 14 December, as well as being interviewed on Alan Carr: Chatty Man that evening. A special documentary about his live show for Little Noise Sessions titled Olly Murs: A Day in the Life, where he performed some album tracks live for the first time, was shown on 4Music on 15 December.

=== Right Place Right Time Tour ===
Murs supported the album with his second live arena tour of the UK and Ireland for 28 dates from February–April 2013, starting at the Metro Radio Arena in Newcastle on 26 February. He then played his first live European dates in Germany, Sweden, Switzerland, and Denmark in April 2013, as well as supporting Robbie Williams on all 22 dates of his Take the Crown Stadium Tour of the UK and Europe in summer 2013. Murs played some shows for the United States in January 2013 and did more shows in April and May to promote the U.S. version of Right Place Right Time released in April. Australian dates were announced on Sunday 7 April 2013.

== Critical reception ==
Professional ratings
Review scores
Source	Rating
BBC Music	4/5 stars
Digital Spy	3/5 stars
The Guardian	3/5 stars
The Independent	2/5 stars
Time Out	3/5 stars
USA Today	2/4 stars

Right Place Right Time received "generally favourable" reviews from music critics. At Metacritic, which assigns a normalised rating out of 100 to reviews from mainstream critics, the album received an average score of 61, based on 4 reviews. John Aizlewood of BBC Music said: "With everything going his way, this is probably exactly how he thought being a pop star would turn out. Only the truly flint-hearted could not wish him well." It received a 3/5 stars review from Digital Spy's Lewis Corner, who said: "It may not be a big departure from his previous efforts, but when you're on to a good thing, why change the pace?"

Danielle Goldstein from Time Out magazine gave Right Place Right Time 3/5 stars: "This isn’t groundbreaking stuff, but it’s heartfelt and fun and by no means a shameful addition to your record collection." Hermione Hoby of The Guardian gave Right Place Right Time a 3/5 rating: "Murs is one of this country's biggest pop stars, with two platinum-selling albums under his belt since doing X Factor time in 2009. This third album makes his success a mite more palatable - there's less of the pop-ska pabulum and more Will Young-style balladeering, mixed in with up-tempo, perky numbers, such as "What a Buzz" – an enthusiastic account of a date, which sounds like a parody of his own hapless-chappy every-bloke persona. The lyric "got ketchup on my trousers and my cheeks are going red" is enough to prompt corresponding blushes of embarrassment in the listener."

In a slightly negative review, Andy Gill from The Independent gave the album two stars, saying "Olly Murs claims to want to grow musically with each album, but any perceived development here beyond last year's In Case You Didn't Know is minutely incremental rather than an ambitious overhaul of his approach." At the USA Today, Elysa Gardner found that "The mostly upbeat, mostly formulaic songs on this X Factor alum's American debut reveal a fluid, serviceable voice but little personality. A few bouncy tracks will grab you right away, but they don't hold on for long."

== Commercial performance ==
In the United Kingdom, Right Place Right Time debuted at number one on the UK Albums Chart, with sales of 127,000 copies sold in its first week giving Murs' second number-one album in the UK in two years. In the same week, the album's lead single "Troublemaker" remained atop the UK Singles Chart for a second consecutive week. Consequently, Murs became the fourth artist after Gary Barlow, Robbie Williams and One Direction to achieve a chart double. It also gave him the fastest selling album of 2012 by a male solo artist in the UK charts, until Bruno Mars's Unorthodox Jukebox sold 136,000 copies two weeks later, knocking him off the top spot. By the end of the year, the album had sold 570,000 copies in the UK alone, becoming the seventh biggest selling album of 2012 in the UK. In February 2013, the album was certified 2× Platinum by the British Phonographic Industry for shipments of over 600,000. With 623,000 copies sold in 2013, it was also the fifth best-selling album in the UK. As of November 2016, the album has sold 1.34 million copies in the United Kingdom.

In Australia, the album debuted at number 87 due to the success of "Troublemaker". Following his performance at the 2013 Logie Awards, the album jumped from number 72 to a new peak of 27. The US version of the album debuted and peaked at #19 on the Billboard 200 Albums in April 2013.

== Track listing ==
Right Place Right Time — Standard version
No.	Title	Writer(s)	Producer(s)	Length
1.	"Army of Two"	Olly Murs; Iyiola Babalola; Wayne Hector; Darren Lewis	Future Cut	4:47
2.	"Troublemaker" (featuring Flo Rida)	Murs; Steve Robson; Claude Kelly; Tramar Dillard	Robson	3:06
3.	"Loud & Clear"	Murs; Kelly; Charles Harmon	Chuck Harmony; Kelly	3:49
4.	"Dear Darlin'"	Murs; Jim Eliot; Ed Drewett	Drewett; Eliot	3:25
5.	"Right Place Right Time"	Murs; Robson; Kelly	Robson	3:13
6.	"Hand on Heart"	Murs; Ben Kohn; Pete Kelleher; Tom Barnes; Hector; Iain James	TMS	3:16
7.	"Hey You Beautiful"	Murs; Robson; Kelly	Robson	3:06
8.	"Head to Toe"	Murs; Kelly; Harmon	Harmony; Kelly	3:15
9.	"Personal"	Murs; Kohn; Kelleher; Barnes; Hector; Kiris Houston	TMS	3:15
10.	"What a Buzz"	Drewett; Julian Bunetta; John Ryan	Bunetta; Ryan	3:07
11.	"Cry Your Heart Out"	Murs; Hector; Lucas Secon; Carsten Mortensen	Secon; The Fearless	3:39
12.	"One of These Days"	Murs; Andrew Frampton; Bunetta; Steve Kipner	Bunetta; Frampton; Kipner	3:06

Right Place Right Time — Deluxe version
No.	Title	Writer(s)	Producer(s)	Length
13.	"Runaway"	Murs, Martin Brammer, Adam Argyle	Argyle	3:37
14.	"Sliding Doors"	Murs, Robson, Hector	Robson	3:56
15.	"Perfect Night (To Say Goodbye)"	Murs, Brammer, Argyle	Argyle	3:22
16.	"The One"	Murs, Drewett, Matt Prime	Prime	3:38
17.	"Troublemaker" (Live)	Robson, Kelly, Dillard	Robson	3:47
18.	"Army of Two" (Live)	Murs, Hector, Babalola, Lewis	Future Cut	4:32

Right Place Right Time — iTunes Store bonus content
No.	Title	Length
19.	"Track by Track Interview" (Part 1)	12:07
20.	"Track by Track Interview" (Part 2)	12:31

Right Place Right Time — Japan bonus tracks
No.	Title	Writer(s)	Producer(s)	Length
13.	"Please Don't Let Me Go"	Murs; Kelly; Robson	Future Cut; Robson; Darren Lewis	3:33
14.	"Heart Skips a Beat" (featuring Rizzle Kicks)	Murs; Alex Smith; Samuel Preston; Jim Eliot; Jordan Stephens; Harley Alexander-Sule	Eliot	3:23
15.	"Dance with Me Tonight"	Murs; Kelly; Robson	Robson	3:25

=== U.S. edition ===
Right Place Right Time — Standard version
No.	Title	Writer(s)	Producer(s)	Length
1.	"Army of Two"	Murs; Hector; Babalola; Lewis	Future Cut	4:47
2.	"Heart Skips a Beat" (featuring Chiddy Bang)	Smith; Preston; Eliot; Chidera Anamege	Eliot	3:25
3.	"Troublemaker" (featuring Flo Rida)	Murs; Kelly; Robson; Dillard	Robson	3:06
4.	"Dance with Me Tonight"	Murs; Kelly; Robson	Future Cut; Robson	3:23
5.	"Hand on Heart"	Murs; Barnes; Hector; James; Kelleher; Kohn	TMS	3:16
6.	"Hey You Beautiful"	Murs; Kelly; Robson	Robson	3:06
7.	"Right Place Right Time"	Murs; Kelly; Robson	Robson	3:13
8.	"Oh My Goodness"	Murs; Argyle; Brammer	Brammer	3:05
9.	"Loud & Clear"	Murs; Kelly; Harmony	Harmony	3:49
10.	"Dear Darlin'"	Murs; Drewett; Eliot	Drewett; Eliot	3:25

Right Place Right Time — Deluxe version
No.	Title	Writer(s)	Producer(s)	Length
11.	"One of These Days"	Murs; Bunetta; Frampton; Kipner	Frampton; Kipner	3:06
12.	"What a Buzz"	Murs; Bunetta; Drewett	Bunetta	3:07
13.	"Cry Your Heart Out"	Murs; Hector; Mortensen; Secon	Secon	3:39
14.	"I Need You Now"	Murs; Argyle; Brammer	Brammer	3:52

== Release formats ==
Standard version

- Jewel case packaging
- Standard 12 tracks

Deluxe version

- Digipak packaging
- Standard 12 tracks (disc one)
- Six additional bonus tracks (disc two)

== Charts ==
=== Weekly charts ===
Chart (2012–2013)	Peak position
Australian Albums (ARIA)	20
Austrian Albums (Ö3 Austria)	5
Belgian Albums (Ultratop Flanders)	71
Belgian Albums (Ultratop Wallonia)	149
Canadian Albums (Billboard)	17
Danish Albums (Hitlisten)	19
Finnish Albums (Suomen virallinen lista)	38
French Albums (SNEP)	122
German Albums (Offizielle Top 100)	22
Irish Albums (IRMA)	3
Japanese Albums (Oricon)	32
South Korean International Albums (Circle)	32
New Zealand Albums (RMNZ)	27
Scottish Albums (Official Charts)	1
Spanish Albums (Promusicae)	94
Swedish Albums (Sverigetopplistan)	14
Swiss Albums (Schweizer Hitparade)	6
UK Albums (Official Charts)	1
UK Album Downloads (Official Charts)	3
US Billboard 200	19

=== Year-end charts ===
Chart (2012)	Position
Irish Albums (IRMA)	18
UK Albums (OCC)	7

Chart (2013)	Position
Australian Albums (ARIA)	66
Austrian Albums (Ö3 Austria)	74
UK Albums (OCC)	5

Chart (2014)	Position
UK Albums (OCC)	79

=== Decade-end charts ===
Chart (2010–2019)	Position
UK Albums (OCC)	21

== Certifications ==
Region	Certification	Certified units/sales
Australia (ARIA)	Gold	35,000^{^}
Austria (IFPI Austria)	Gold	10,000^{*}
Germany (BVMI)	Gold	100,000^{^}
Ireland (IRMA)	Platinum	15,000^{^}
New Zealand (RMNZ)	Platinum	15,000^{‡}
Switzerland (IFPI Switzerland)	Gold	15,000^{^}
United Kingdom (BPI)	5× Platinum	1,500,000^{‡}
^{*} Sales figures based on certification alone.^{^} Shipments figures based on certification alone.^{‡} Sales+streaming figures based on certification alone.

== Release history ==
Country	Date	Format	Label
Netherlands	23 November 2012	CD, digital download	Sony BMG
New Zealand	23 November 2012	CD, digital download	Sony Music
United Kingdom	26 November 2012	CD, digital download	Syco Music, Epic
Australia	30 November 2012	CD, digital download	Sony Music Australia
Poland	22 January 2013	CD, digital download	Sony Music Poland
United States	16 April 2013	CD, digital download	Syco Music, Columbia
Spain	16 April 2013	CD, digital download	Sony Music Spain

== Right Place Right Time (Special Edition) ==
Right Place Right Time (Special Edition)

Studio album (reissue) by Olly Murs
- Released: 25 November 2013
- Labels: Epic; Syco
- Producers: Ed Drewett; Steve Kipner; Lucas Secon; Andrew Frampton; Future Cut; Wayne Hector; TMS; Claude Kelly; Steve Robson

Olly Murs chronology
Right Place Right Time (2012)	Right Place Right Time (Special Edition) (2013)	Never Been Better (2014)

Singles from Right Place Right Time Special Edition
- 1. "Hand on Heart" Released: 24 November 2013

Right Place Right Time (Special Edition) is a reissue of the album. It was released on 25 November 2013, through Epic Records and Syco Music. Right Place Right Time (Special Edition) features seven new tracks and a DVD, Olly Murs: Live at the O2 Arena.

=== Track listing ===
Right Place Right Time (Special Edition) — Standard version
No.	Title	Writer(s)	Producer(s)	Length
1.	"Army of Two"	Olly Murs; Iyiola Babalola; Wayne Hector; Darren Lewis	Future Cut	4:47
2.	"Troublemaker" (featuring Flo Rida)	Murs; Claude Kelly; Steve Robson; Tramar Dillard	Robson	3:06
3.	"Loud & Clear"	Murs; Kelly; Chuck Harmony	Harmony	3:49
4.	"Dear Darlin'"	Murs; Ed Drewett; Jim Eliot	Drewett; Eliot	3:25
5.	"Right Place Right Time"	Murs; Kelly; Robson	Robson	3:13
6.	"Hand on Heart"	Murs; Tom Barnes; Hector; Iain James; Pete Kelleher; Ben Kohn	TMS	3:16
7.	"Hey You Beautiful"	Murs; Kelly; Robson	Robson	3:06
8.	"Head to Toe"	Murs; Kelly; Harmony	Harmony	3:15
9.	"Personal"	Murs; Barnes; Hector; Christopher Houston; Kelleher; Kohn	TMS	3:15
10.	"What a Buzz"	Murs; Julian Bunetta; Drewett	Bunetta	3:07
11.	"Cry Your Heart Out"	Murs; Hector; Carsten Mortensen; Lucas Secon	Secon	3:39
12.	"One of These Days"	Murs; Bunetta; Andrew Frampton; Steve Kipner	Frampton; Kipner	3:06
13.	"Stop Tryna Change Me"	Murs; Kelly; John Lardieri; Charles Harmon		4:12
14.	"That's Alright With Me"	Murs; Samuel Preston; Mark Taylor		3:17
15.	"I Wish It Could Be Christmas Everyday" (BBC Live Version)	Roy Wood		3:38
16.	"Inner Ninja" (Classified featuring Olly Murs)	Luke Boyd; Mark Pellizzer; David Myles; Mike Boyd		3:04
17.	"Did I Lose You" (Giorgia & Olly Murs)	Busbee; Lauren Evans; Alex James		3:47
18.	"Dear Darlin'" (featuring Alizée)	Murs; Eliot; Drewett		3:27
19.	"Hand on Heart" (Radio Mix)	Murs; Kohn; Hector; Kelleher; Barnes; Iain James		3:18

Right Place Right Time (Special Edition) — DVD: Right Place Right Time Tour Live from The O2 Arena
No.	Title	Length
1.	"Army of Two"	4:17
2.	"Dance with Me Tonight"	3:58
3.	"Personal"	3:29
4.	"Thinking of Me"	3:45
5.	"I've Tried Everything"	3:57
6.	"I Need You Now"	4:08
7.	"Hey You Beautiful"	4:08
8.	"I'm OK"	4:04
9.	"Hand on Heart"	3:51
10.	"Loud & Clear"	3:30
11.	"Busy / Heart on My Sleeve"	8:40
12.	"Should I Stay Or Should I Go / Town Called Malice"	5:00
13.	"Please Don't Let Me Go"	4:11
14.	"Dear Darlin'"	3:38
15.	"One of These Days"	3:07
16.	"Oh My Goodness"	3:55
17.	"Heart Skips a Beat"	4:19
18.	"Right Place Right Time"	4:01
19.	"Troublemaker"	5:08

Right Place Right Time (Special Edition) — Japan version
No.	Title	Writer(s)	Producer(s)	Length
13.	"Please Don't Let Me Go"			3:35
14.	"Heart Skips a Beat" (featuring Rizzle Kicks)			3:25
15.	"Dance with Me Tonight"
16.	"Runaway"	Murs, Brammer, Argyle	Argyle	3:37
17.	"Sliding Doors"	Murs, Robson, Hector	Robson	3:57
18.	"Perfect Night (to Say Goodbye)"	Murs, Brammer, Argyle	Argyle	3:22
19.	"The One"	Murs, Drewett, Prime	Prime	3:38
20.	"Stop Tryna Change Me"	Murs, Kelly, Lardieri, Harmon		4:12
21.	"That's Alright with Me"	Murs, Preston, Taylor		3:18

Right Place Right Time (Special Edition) — Japan version DVD
No.	Title	Length
1.	"Right Place Right Time (Menu Item Music Content)"
2.	"Hand on Heart (Menu Item Music Content)"
3.	"Troublemaker (Menu Item Music Content)"
4.	"Dear Darlin' (Menu Item Music Content)"
5.	"Concert Opening (Live from The O2 Arena)"
6.	"Army of Two (Live from The O2 Arena)"	4:17
7.	"Dance with Me Tonight (Live from The O2 Arena)"	3:58
8.	"Personal (Live from The O2 Arena)"	3:29
9.	"Thinking of Me (Live from The O2 Arena)"	3:45
10.	"That's the Way I Like It (Live from The O2 Arena)"
11.	"I've Tried Everything (Live from The O2 Arena)"	3:57
12.	"I Need You Now (Live from The O2 Arena)"	4:08
13.	"Hey You Beautiful (Live from The O2 Arena)"	4:08
14.	"I'm OK (Live from The O2 Arena)"	4:04
15.	"Hand on Heart (Live from The O2 Arena)"	3:51
16.	"Loud & Clear (Live from The O2 Arena)"	3:30
17.	"Busy / Heart on My Sleeve (Live from The O2 Arena)"	8:40
18.	"The 900 Number (Live from The O2 Arena)"
19.	"Careless Whisper (Live from The O2 Arena)"
20.	"Reet Petite (Live from The O2 Arena)"
21.	"Crazy in Love (Live from The O2 Arena)"
22.	"Should I Stay Or Should I Go / Town Called Malice (Live from The O2 Arena)"	5:00
23.	"Please Don't Let Me Go (Live from The O2 Arena)"	4:11
24.	"Dear Darlin' (Live from The O2 Arena)"	3:38
25.	"One of These Days (Live from The O2 Arena)"	3:07
26.	"Oh My Goodness (Live from The O2 Arena)"	3:55
27.	"Heart Skips a Beat (Live from The O2 Arena)"	4:19
28.	"Right Place Right Time (Live from The O2 Arena)"	4:01
29.	"Troublemaker (Live from The O2 Arena)"	5:08
30.	"Troublemaker Outro (Live from The O2 Arena)"
