= In Case You Didn't Know (album) =

Studio album by Olly Murs
- Released: 25 November 2011
- Recorded: 2010–2011
- Genre: Pop
- Length: 45:05
- Label: Syco; Epic
- Producer: Jim Eliot; Martin Brammer; Steve Robson; Andrew Frampton; Matt Prime; Mark Taylor

Olly Murs chronology
Olly Murs (2010)	In Case You Didn't Know (2011)	Right Place Right Time (2012)

Alternative cover
- Alternative cover art

Singles from In Case You Didn't Know
- 1. "Heart Skips a Beat" Released: 19 August 2011; 2. "Dance with Me Tonight" Released: 18 November 2011; 3. "Oh My Goodness" Released: 1 April 2012

In Case You Didn't Know is the second studio album by English singer-songwriter Olly Murs, released on 25 November 2011, through Epic Records. The album's release was preceded by the number-one singles "Heart Skips a Beat" on 19 August 2011, and "Dance with Me Tonight", on 20 November 2011. The album's track listing was confirmed by Digital Spy on 7 October 2011. The album debuted at number 1 on the UK Albums Chart, marking Murs' first chart topper.

== Background ==
In June 2011, it was heavily rumoured that Murs had begun working on his second studio album. In the same month, Murs confirmed that he had been back in the studio, and that he was creating an album with a different approach to the first, stating that he wanted to explore all kinds of music. He commented: "I'm secretly not a bad rapper, and I really like to do a bit of beatboxing. Eminem has always been a favourite, but Vanilla Ice's "Ice Ice Baby" is a classic." On 27 August, during an interview with Digital Spy, Murs stated and that he was looking to create an album that was gracious of his roots.

== Singles ==
- "Heart Skips a Beat" – In July 2011, Murs unveiled the album's lead single, "Heart Skips a Beat", a collaboration with Brit-hop duo Rizzle Kicks. The single was released on 19 August 2011, peaking at #1 on the UK Singles Chart and #6 on the Irish Singles Chart. The single sold more than 109,000 units on the week of release, becoming his fastest selling single ever. For release in the United States, the track was remixed to feature Chiddy Bang. The single was released on 29 May 2012 in the United States. It charted on the Billboard Hot 100 at #96 and #25 on the Billboard Pop Songs chart.
- "Dance with Me Tonight" – In September 2011, Murs premiered a thirty-second clip from the album's second single, "Dance With Me Tonight", and stated that the single was due for release on 20 November 2011. The music video premiered days later, featuring Murs being arrested after pursuing a prospective love interest. The single debuted at #2 on the UK Singles Chart, (kept off by Rihanna's "We Found Love") and then reached #1 two weeks later and to date, has sold more copies than any other of Murs' singles.
- "Oh My Goodness" – "Oh My Goodness" was released as the album's third single on 1 April 2012. The music video for the track premiered later that month, featuring Murs chasing a prospective love interest through a shopping center. The track reached number 13 on the UK Singles Chart. The single was released in Germany on 10 August 2012, as the album's second single in the country, peaking at #23 on the German Singles Chart.

== Tour ==
In February and March 2012, Murs did an arena tour of the UK and Ireland.

Set list

1. "Anywhere Else"
2. "Change Is Gonna Come"
3. "Thinking of Me"
4. "Tell the World"
5. "On My Cloud"/"I Need a Dollar"
6. "This Song Is About You"
7. "Busy"
8. "I'm OK"
9. "I Don't Love You Too"
10. "Just Smile"
11. "In Case You Didn't Know"
12. "It Must Be Love"
13. "Play Off"
14. "One Step Beyond"
15. "Dance With Me Tonight"
16. "Oh My Goodness"
17. "I Need You Now"
18. "Sex Machine"
19. "Papa's Got a Brand New Bag"
20. "Get Up Offa That Thing"
21. "I Got You (I Feel Good)"
22. "Heart on My Sleeve"
23. "Please Don't Let Me Go"

Encore

24. "Heart Skips a Beat"

=== Shows ===
List of concerts, showing date, city, country, venue, opening act, tickets sold, number of available tickets and amount of gross revenue
Date	City	Country	Venue
Leg 1 — Europe
1 February 2012	Cardiff	United Kingdom	Motorpoint Arena
4 February 2012	London	United Kingdom	O2 Arena
7 February 2012	Brighton	United Kingdom	Brighton Centre
10 February 2012	Birmingham	United Kingdom	LG Arena
11 February 2012	London	United Kingdom	Wembley Arena
12 February 2012	Sheffield	United Kingdom	Motorpoint Arena
13 February 2012	Nottingham	United Kingdom	Capital FM Arena
15 February 2012	Bournemouth	United Kingdom	Bournemouth BIC
18 February 2012	Manchester	United Kingdom	Manchester Arena
19 February 2012	Liverpool	United Kingdom	Echo Arena
21 February 2012	Aberdeen	United Kingdom	ECC
24 February 2012	Newcastle	United Kingdom	Metro Radio Arena
25 February 2012	Glasgow	United Kingdom	SECC
28 February 2012	Belfast	United Kingdom	Belfast Odyssey
29 February 2012	Dublin	Ireland	The O2

== Commercial performance ==
In Case You Didn't Know entered the UK Albums Chart at number-one with first week sales of over 148,000 copies, dethroning Rihanna's Talk That Talk album from that position, becoming Murs' first album to top the chart. On 9 December 2011, the album was certified Platinum by the British Phonographic Industry for shipments of 300,000 copies in the UK. The album debuted at number six and peaked at number two on the Irish Albums Chart, marking it Murs' first album to chart within the top ten and highest-peaking album. As of November 2018, the album has sold 1.12 million in the United Kingdom.

== Track listing ==
Standard version
No.	Title	Writer(s)	Producer(s)	Length
1.	"Heart Skips a Beat" (featuring Rizzle Kicks)	Alex Smith; Samuel Preston; Jim Eliot; Jordan Stephens; Harley Alexander-Sule	Jim Eliot	3:26
2.	"Oh My Goodness"	Olly Murs; Adam Argyle; Martin Brammer	Martin Brammer	3:05
3.	"Dance with Me Tonight"	Murs; Claude Kelly; Steve Robson	Steve Robson	3:23
4.	"I've Tried Everything"	Murs; Argyle; Brammer	Martin Brammer	3:25
5.	"This Song Is About You"	Murs, Kelly, Robson	Steve Robson	3:46
6.	"In Case You Didn't Know"	Murs, Kelly, Robson	Steve Robson	3:26
7.	"Tell the World"	Murs, Andrew Frampton, Patrick Jordan-Patrikios, Abeeku 'Bayku' Ribeiro	Andrew Frampton	3:47
8.	"I'm OK"	Murs, Smith, Wayne Hector	Jim Eliot	3:46
9.	"Just Smile"	Murs, Karen Poole, Matt Prime	Matt Prime	3:45
10.	"On My Cloud"	Murs, Mark Taylor, Preston	Mark Taylor	2:24
11.	"I Don't Love You Too"	Murs, Kelly, Robson	Steve Robson	4:05
12.	"Anywhere Else"	Murs, Smith, Hector	Jim Eliot	3:25
13.	"I Need You Now"	Murs, Argyle, Brammer	Brammer	3:27

iTunes deluxe edition
No.	Title	Length
14.	"Heart Skips a Beat" (Acoustic Version) (Video)	3:09
15.	"Dance with Me Tonight" (Acoustic Version) (Video)	3:05

== Charts ==
=== Weekly charts ===
Chart (2011–2012)	Peak position
Austrian Albums (Ö3 Austria)	68
Belgian Albums (Ultratop Flanders)	146
German Albums (Offizielle Top 100)	18
Irish Albums (IRMA)	2
Polish Albums (ZPAV)	68
Scottish Albums (OCC)	2
Swedish Albums (Sverigetopplistan)	10
Swiss Albums (Schweizer Hitparade)	19
UK Albums (OCC)	1

=== Year-end charts ===
Chart (2011)	Position
Irish Albums Chart	20
UK Albums Chart	12
Chart (2012)	Position
UK Albums Chart	20

=== Decade-end charts ===
Chart (2010–2019)	Position
UK Albums (OCC)	36

== Certifications ==
Region	Certification	Certified units/sales
Ireland (IRMA)	2× Platinum	30,000^{^}
United Kingdom (BPI)	3× Platinum	1,120,000
Summaries
Europe (IFPI)	Platinum	1,000,000^{*}
^{*} Sales figures based on certification alone.^{^} Shipments figures based on certification alone.

== Release history ==
Country	Date	Format	Label
Ireland	25 November 2011	CD, digital download	Syco Music, Epic Records
Spain	25 November 2011	CD, digital download	Syco Music, Epic Records
United Kingdom	28 November 2011	CD, digital download	Syco Music, Epic Records
Poland	16 January 2012	CD, digital download	Sony Music
Germany	9 March 2012	CD, digital download	Sony Music
France	2 April 2012	CD, digital download	Sony Music
