= Hand on Heart =

Single by Olly Murs

from the album Right Place Right Time and Right Place Right Time: Special Edition
- Released: 22 November 2013
- Recorded: 2013
- Genre: Power pop
- Length: 3:18
- Label: Epic; Syco
- Songwriters: Olly Murs; Ben Kohn; Pete Kelleher; Tom Barnes; Wayne Hector; Iain James
- Producer: TMS

Olly Murs singles chronology
"Inner Ninja (Remix)" (2013)	"Hand on Heart" (2013)	"Wrapped Up" (2014)

"Hand on Heart" is a song by English singer-songwriter Olly Murs for his third studio album Right Place Right Time (2012). The song was released as the fifth single from the album, although released to promote the 2013 re-release. It was co-written by Murs, Ben Kohn, Pete Kelleher, Tom Barnes, Wayne Hector and Iain James while the production was handled by TMS. Another version of the song was released in Spain with the Spanish pop singer Edurne collaborating.

== Music video ==
A music video for the song was released on 4 November 2013. Inspired by the video to Robbie Williams' hit single "Angels", it was shot in black-and-white and directed by Vaughan Arnell, who shot the original video to "Angels".

Williams, who made a cameo appearance in the video, commented, "Imitation is the highest form of flattery. I am easily flattered, and I love Olly. We always have a good time together and this was no exception."

== Live performances ==
Murs performed the song on the seventh live show of the tenth series of The X Factor, the seventeenth season of Dancing with the Stars, The Jonathan Ross Show, John Bishop's Christmas Show and the duet version featuring Spanish singer Edurne on "Los Premios 40 Principales" 2013 in Madrid.

== Chart performance ==
On the week commencing 18 November 2013, "Hand on Heart" debuted and peaked at number 73 in Australia, becoming Murs' fourth song to enter the ARIA Singles Chart in 2013.

== Credits and personnel ==
Credits adapted from the liner notes of Right Place Right Time, Epic Records, Syco Records.

Recording

- Produced at The Music Shed, London, England
- Mixed at The Pierce Rooms, London, England

Personnel

- Lead vocals – Olly Murs
- Songwriting – Olly Murs, Ben Kohn, Pete Kelleher, Tom Barnes, Wayne Hector, Iain James
- Production – TMS
- Backing vocals – Wayne Hector, Iain James
- Guitar – Ben Kohn
- Drums – Tom Barns
- Keyboards – Pete Kelleher
- Mixing – Steve Fitzmaurice, Darren Heelis (assistant)

== Charts ==
Weekly chart performance
Chart (2013)	Peak position
Australia (ARIA)	73
Finland Airplay (Radiosoittolista)	61
Hungary (Stream Top 40)	5
Ireland (IRMA)	50
Spain (Promusicae) Duet version featuring Edurne	46
UK Singles (Official Charts)	25
