= Right Place Right Time (song) =

Single by Olly Murs

from the album Right Place Right Time
- Released: 23 August 2013
- Genre: Pop
- Length: 3:12
- Label: Epic Records
- Songwriters: Olly Murs; Claude Kelly; Steve Robson
- Producer: Steve Robson

Olly Murs singles chronology
"Dear Darlin'" (2013)	"Right Place Right Time" (2013)	"Inner Ninja (Remix)" (2013)

"Right Place Right Time" is a song by English singer-songwriter Olly Murs. It was released in the United Kingdom on 25 August 2013 as the fourth single from his album of the same name. The song was written by Murs, Claude Kelly, Steve Robson and produced by Robson. The track reached No. 27 in the UK Top 40.

== Background ==
The song was released on 25 August 2013 as a digital download bundle, which included a live version of the track recorded at Murs' headline show at London's O2 Arena. It also included remixes by Thomas Gandey and Steve Pitron & Max Sanna. Murs performed this song along with "Troublemaker" when he guest starred in an episode of the fifth season of 90210.

== Music video ==
The video was uploaded to Murs's Vevo channel on 5 August 2013. It features clips from Murs's career including his X Factor audition, his time on the show, the Comic Relief desert trek, his arena tour, playing at Soccer Aid, as a child, meeting fans, his tour of the United States, his time on The Xtra Factor, filming his other music videos, photo shoots and his performances on Robbie Williams's Take the Crown Stadium Tour. Another part of the video which was filmed at Wembley features Murs in a dressing room playing a keyboard and guitar as well as trying on different outfits.

== Live performances ==
In April 2013, he made a guest appearance as himself on an episode of the fifth season of the American drama series 90210 and performed "Right Place Right Time" and "Troublemaker". In the United Kingdom, he performed the song on the fourth semi-final results show of Britain's Got Talent.

== Popular culture ==
The song featured in a trailer for the 2014 film Love, Rosie.

== Track listing ==
Digital remixes
No.	Title	Version	Length
1.	"Right Place Right Time"		3:12
2.	"Right Place Right Time"	Live From The O2 Arena	4:15
3.	"Right Place Right Time"	Max Sanna & Steve Pitron Radio Edit	3:40
4.	"Right Place Right Time"	Thomas Gandey Club Mix	5:33
5.	"Right Place Right Time"	Music video	3:13

== Charts ==
Chart (2013)	Peak position
Australia (ARIA)	88
Belgium (Ultratip Bubbling Under Flanders)	2
Germany (GfK)	53
Ireland (IRMA)	74
Scotland Singles (OCC)	22
UK Singles (OCC)	27

== Release history ==
Country	Date	Format	Label
Ireland	23 August 2013	Digital remixes	Epic Records
United Kingdom	25 August 2013	Digital remixes	Epic Records
Germany	14 February 2014	Digital remixes	Epic Records
