= Dance with Me Tonight =

2011 single by Olly Murs

Single by Olly Murs

from the album In Case You Didn't Know and Right Place Right Time (US version)
- B-side: "Baby Blue Eyes"
- Released: 18 November 2011
- Recorded: 2011
- Genre: Pop; doo-wop
- Length: 3:23
- Label: Syco; Epic
- Songwriters: Olly Murs; Claude Kelly; Steve Robson
- Producer: Steve Robson

Olly Murs singles chronology
"Heart Skips a Beat" (2011)	"Dance with Me Tonight" (2011)	"Oh My Goodness" (2012)

"Dance with Me Tonight" is a single by English singer-songwriter Olly Murs, taken from his second studio album, In Case You Didn't Know. It was released as the album's second single on 18 November 2011 and was written by Murs, Claude Kelly and Steve Robson.

The song stayed at number two in the UK for two consecutive weeks before finally giving Murs his third UK number-one single in December 2011. The track was released as the album's third single across Europe in November 2012, and as with his previous European single "Oh My Goodness" will receive a CD release that was absent in the UK. In August 2013 a new version of the song was released as the third single from the US version of Right Place, Right Time.

== Background and composition ==
"Dance with Me Tonight" (2011)
A 20-second sample of "Dance with Me Tonight", a pop, swing and jazz song.

Murs wrote the song with Claude Kelly and Steve Robson in the spring of 2011, following their successful collaborations on the first album including his debut number one, "Please Don't Let Me Go". Lyrically, Murs has said that the song was inspired by his frustration with modern-day dating, in particular the incessant use of social networking websites: "I'm sick of Twitter and Facebook, you know, I want to meet a girl in a club or in a bar. Everytime I meet a girl they're like 'Just add me on Facebook, or Tweet me', and it's like why don't we go out on a proper date like we used to back in the early 2000s, go for a proper drink and get to know her? So I went into the studio and just went, 'OK, I wanna write a really old, classic song about seeing a really fit girl in a club and taking her out on a date.'"

In an interview with Music Week in September 2011, he also added that it was the soulful, Motown feel of the song that was to influence the direction of the In Case You Didn't Know album as a whole, and that he was keen to reinvent his sound from his previous album: "We had to change slightly and I looked at myself. The ska/reggae vibe put me in a place but I don’t want to be the same artist over and over and over again because people get bored. You have to keep it fresh. We decided the ‘white boy soul’ sound was really me and we wrote 'Dance With Me Tonight', which solidified where we'd go. When we wrote that song we knew that was the direction." The brass section was provided by the Blackjack Horns : Nik Carter – Sax / Jack Birchwood – Trumpet and Steven Fuller – Trombone.

In 2013, the song was nominated for a Ivor Novello award for Most Performed Work.

== Critical reception ==
The single received mixed reviews from critics upon its release. Hit the Floor magazine awarded it five out of five, calling it a "great do-wop 50s style number that will no doubt reach the uppermost rankings of the chart." Robert Copsey of Digital Spy, however, gave the song three out of five stars. He was most critical of the sound of the song and its lyrics, stating that "the swinging '60s funk-pop sound of his latest effort might not be the most original, and the lyrics are cheesier than a tube of Primula", but praised it for being "unashamedly fun."

== Music video ==
A music video to accompany the release of "Dance with Me Tonight" was directed by Marcus Lundin. It was first released onto YouTube on 14 October 2011 at a total length of three minutes and twenty-six seconds.

The video starts with Olly going through a police station and pulling funny poses at a mug shot camera, after being arrested with his friends and another girl. Five hours before the incident, he drives around London in a Peugeot 504 Cabriolet, picking up his best friend and supplies for a street party along the way. In the process of getting the supplies, Olly also invites two young clerks to come along with him. Together they set up the street party with the aim of Olly wooing the girl who was with him in the police station called "Jamie Winter" (played by actress and model Katja Zwara). They dance as a display of fireworks goes off behind them, whilst a more senior female citizen looks out disturbed by the noise, and calls the police. As the video ends Olly and Jamie are arrested by the police revealing what they were arrested for was obviously disturbing the peace.

Filming took place over one day in late August 2011 in Putney, South West London. The iconic Putney Wharf Tower, Putney Bridge, along with parts of Fulham, Fulham Palace Road, Lysia Street and Bishops Park Road are shown as "snapshots" during the course of the video. Mortlake, Waterloo and New Cross were other filming locations.

For the American release Murs released a lyric video which featured clips from his time in America and fans dancing.

== Live performances ==
On 27 November 2011, Murs performed "Dance with Me Tonight" for the first time on The X Factor results show. He performed with The Muppets, and the studio version of this performance was featured as a bonus track on the UK version of the soundtrack for the new The Muppets that was released in UK cinemas in February 2012. Murs also performed the song for his special for Channel 4's The Album Chart Show on 4 December 2011, MTV Live Sessions on 11 December 2011, and on RTÉ One's The Late Late Toy Show on 2 December 2011, and acoustically for T4 show Sunday Brunch on 18 December 2011. The track was also performed in April 2012 on the Channel 4 show Hit the Road Jack, hosted by comedian Jack Whitehall. Murs' first American TV performance of the song was on Good Morning America on 28 September 2012, where he also performed "Heart Skips a Beat". On 18 January 2020, Murs performed the song on The Voice UK during a surprise performance with fellow judge Meghan Trainor, alongside Trainor's notably similar song "Dear Future Husband". Murs also performed the song at the Coronation Concert of King Charles III at Windsor Castle on 7 May 2023.

== Chart performance ==
"Dance with Me Tonight" debuted on the UK Singles Chart at number two on 27 November 2011, behind Rihanna and Calvin Harris' collaborative single "We Found Love", which spent a sixth non-consecutive week at number one. The following week saw the single remain at number two, this time behind The X Factor finalists with "Wishing on a Star" featuring JLS and One Direction. On its third charting week, 11 December, the single climbed to number-one, marking Murs' third number-one single after "Please Don't Let Me Go" (2010) and "Heart Skips a Beat" (2011).

It had by this point sold over 200,000 copies before reaching the top of the UK chart – more than any other number one single that year. It spent 8 weeks inside the UK top 10, and a total of 20 weeks inside the UK top 40, making it one of his most successful singles in the UK to date. It also topped the UK radio airplay chart for six weeks between December 2011 and January 2012, and became his highest charting solo single to date in Ireland, peaking at number two.

== Popular culture ==
In August 2013, the song was used as the theme tune to ITV dancing show Stepping Out and was sung by the show's house band.

As of May 2014 the song has been used in an advert for Kinder Chocolate bars.

Japanese singer Akiko Wada recorded a cover of the song for her 2015 album WADASOUL.

It is also featured on Disney's Have a Laugh!'s Re-Micks episode.

During the months of November and December 2021, the song began to trend on the social media platform TikTok with users doing a particular dance routine to the song.

== Track listing ==
Digital EP
No.	Title	Length
1.	""Dance with Me Tonight""	3:23
2.	""Dance with Me Tonight"" (Cagedbaby Radio Edit)	3:53
3.	""Dance with Me Tonight"" (Billionaire Remix)	5:13
4.	""Baby Blue Eyes""	3:36

CD single
No.	Title	Length
1.	"Dance with Me Tonight"	3:23
2.	"Baby Blue Eyes"	3:36

== Charts ==
=== Weekly charts ===
Chart (2011–2012)	Peak position
Australia (ARIA)	62
Austria (Ö3 Austria Top 40)	65
Belgium (Ultratip Bubbling Under Flanders)	20
Hungary (Rádiós Top 40)	7
Ireland (IRMA)	2
Scottish Singles Sales (Official Charts)	1
UK Singles (Official Charts)	1
US Bubbling Under Hot 100 (Billboard)	23

=== Year-end charts ===
Chart (2011)	Position
UK Singles (OCC)	54

Chart (2012)	Position
UK Singles (OCC)	57

== Certifications ==
Region	Certification	Certified units/sales
Australia (ARIA)	Gold	35,000^{‡}
Denmark (IFPI Danmark)	Gold	45,000^{‡}
New Zealand (RMNZ)	Platinum	30,000^{‡}
United Kingdom (BPI)	2× Platinum	1,200,000^{‡}
^{‡} Sales+streaming figures based on certification alone.

== Release history ==
Country	Date	Format	Label
Ireland	18 November 2011	Digital download	Epic Records, Syco Music
United Kingdom	18 November 2011	Digital download	Epic Records, Syco Music
Germany	23 November 2012	CD single	Epic Records, Syco Music
United States	20 August 2013	Digital download	Columbia Records
