= Oh My Goodness =

Single by Olly Murs

from the album In Case You Didn't Know
- B-side: "Don't Say Goodnight Yet"
- Released: 1 April 2012
- Recorded: 2011
- Genre: Pop
- Length: 3:05
- Label: Epic Records
- Songwriters: Olly Murs; Adam Argyle; Martin Brammer
- Producer: Martin Brammer

Olly Murs singles chronology
"Dance with Me Tonight" (2011)	"Oh My Goodness" (2012)	"Troublemaker" (2012)

"Oh My Goodness" is a song by English singer-songwriter Olly Murs, from his second studio album, In Case You Didn't Know (2011). Written by Murs, Adam Argyle and Martin Brammer, it was released by Epic Records as the album's third and final single on 1 April 2012. The song, a "love at first sight" story, is a pop beat, with lyrics about a man falling for an attractive girl and wanting to be with her. It garnered a positive reception from critics for having upbeat catchability along with colourful instrumentation.

"Oh My Goodness" became Murs's sixth UK top-20 hit, reaching a peak of number 13. It also reached the top 40 in countries like Ireland, Belgium, Germany, and Austria. The accompanying music video for the song, directed by Marcus Lundin, features Murs being smitten by a girl and looks all around the shopping centre to find her. Murs promoted the song by making television appearances in shows like The Graham Norton Show, This Morning, and Friday Download.

== Background ==
Murs wrote the song with Argyle and Brammer after being inspired by seeing an attractive girl whilst on a lunch break from recording sessions for the In Case You Didn't Know album in summer 2011, and the song tells the story of a man who falls in love with a girl at first sight, and that his lack of rationale does not matter to him as he is "dreaming of a life that anybody else would die for". In an interview with Channel 4 music show Freshly Squeezed, Murs added: 'It's kind of about love at first sight, really. That moment when you see a really attractive girl, and the video reflects that with the storyline.' A short instrumental of the song's chorus acts as the theme tune to his ITV2 documentary series Olly: Life on Murs.

== Music video ==
The music video for "Oh My Goodness" was teased with a short 30 second clip on VEVO a week before its premiere, and was first released onto YouTube and VEVO on 24 February 2012 at a total length of three minutes and eleven seconds. The video was shot in the new Westfield Stratford City shopping complex in east London in January 2012, and was directed by Marcus Lundin (who also directed the video for Murs' previous single, "Dance with Me Tonight"). In the video whilst going up an escalator with friends, Murs sees an attractive girl (Mecia Simson) on the escalator going in the opposite direction. Instantly attracted to her, Murs, unknown to her, gives chase after her through the shopping centre – tearing through shop displays, knocking over waiters and using a segway before finally catching up with her at the video's end.

== Critical reception ==
The single was met with mostly positive reviews from critics upon its release. Lewis Corner, writing for Digital Spy, awarded it four out of five, and praised the song as an "ear-grabbing tune" with "a dashing brass section and toe-tapping guitar riff so colourful and suave that even a Disney Prince Charming would struggle to compete with". Melisa Greenfield, writing for Stereoboard.com, also noted the positive, upbeat vibe of the song, saying: "This song is incredible and will put a smile on even the grumpiest faces – even if it’s just because they’re smiling at the dancing of those around them because, let’s face it, this song does make you want to dance."

== Live performances ==
Murs gave his first live performances of the song on his arena tour of the UK and Ireland in February 2012. The first televised performance of the song was on The Graham Norton Show on 9 March 2012, where he was also interviewed along with guests Damian Lewis and Gérard Depardieu. Murs has also performed the song at The Sport Relief Mile Show, This Morning, Friday Download, The Crush, The One and Only Des O'Connor and his special celebrity edition of Deal or No Deal. In Germany, the song has been performed on the soap opera GZSZ and The Dome.

== Popular culture ==
In December 2014, the song featured in a Big Sale advert for BT Broadband.

== Track listing ==
Digital EP
No.	Title	Length
1.	"Oh My Goodness" (Radio Edit)	3:07
2.	"Don't Say Goodnight Yet"	2:54
3.	"Oh My Goodness" (Cagedbaby Club Mix)	7:22
4.	"Oh My Goodness" (Live Acoustic performance)	3:19

CD single
No.	Title	Length
1.	"Oh My Goodness" (Radio Edit)	3:07
2.	"Don't Say Goodnight Yet"	2:54

== Charts ==
=== Weekly charts ===
Chart (2012)	Peak position
Austria (Ö3 Austria Top 40)	27
Belgium (Ultratip Bubbling Under Flanders)	19
Germany (GfK)	24
Ireland (IRMA)	13
Scotland Singles (OCC)	10
UK Singles (OCC)	13

=== Year-end charts ===
Chart (2012)	Position
UK Singles (OCC)	158

== Certifications ==
Region	Certification	Certified units/sales
United Kingdom (BPI)	Silver	200,000^{‡}
^{‡} Sales+streaming figures based on certification alone.

== Release history ==
Country	Date	Format	Label
United Kingdom	1 April 2012	Digital download	Epic Records
Germany	10 August 2012	CD single	Epic Records
