= 24 Hrs Tour =

2017 concert tour by Olly Murs

- Tour by Olly Murs
- Location: United Kingdom (various); United Arab Emirates
- Associated album: 24 Hrs
- Start date: 3 March 2017
- End date: 27 August 2017
- Legs: 3
- No. of shows: 55 in Europe; 1 in Asia; 56 Total

Olly Murs concert chronology
- Never Been Better Tour (2015); 24 Hrs Tour (2017); You Know, I Know Tour (2019)

The 24 Hrs Tour (advertised as Spring Tour 2017 and Summer Tour 2017) was the fifth concert tour by English recording artist, Olly Murs. The tour supports his fifth studio album, 24 Hrs (2016). Beginning March 2017, the tour played over 50 concerts in Europe and Asia.

== Background ==
The tour was announced September 2016 on Murs various social media platforms. The first left of dates sold well, prompting a second leg of outdoor shows revealed in November 2016. Rehearsals began February 2017 in Brighton. Discussing his open air dates, Murs stated:

"A summer tour is not something I've done in a long time and there's places on it that I haven't been to in a while, so it'll be good to get out and see those people. The outdoor shows are always that little bit crazier. When you're in an arena, you can create more of a story on the stage, but for a festival or a park, it's all just about the live performance."

== Critical reception ==
Shows in the UK were high praised amongst local critics. Lorna Hughes (Liverpool Echo) gave Murs performance in Liverpool five out of five stars. She wrote: "Olly is the consummate entertainer, and at times seems to be having even more fun than the audience. Between songs he shares how much he loves Liverpool and how a very honest Scouse lady in catering pointed out the giant spot on his face."

In Birmingham, Justine Halifax (Birmingham Mail) gave the concert four out of five stars. "He then delivered the party atmosphere that he had promised when he took to the stage. Accompanied by an amazing nine-piece band and four backing singers, the former X Factor runner up, who announced that he was 'feeling a little bit frisky', then romped through hits from his five albums."

Matilda Egere-Cooper (London Evening Standard) gave the shows in London three out of five stars. She states: "With nods to Robbie Williams and Justin Timberlake, his gig was 90 minutes of fun-filled showmanship from a singer who's learned he's better off sticking to his strengths. Strokes of laddish humour, dad-dancing and chart-toppers such as Heart Skips a Beat and Dance With Me Tonight all appeared among the fancy visuals and pyrotechnics."

== Opening acts ==
- Louisa Johnson (Leg 2) - Most locations & dates
- Bodg & Matt (Newcastle)
- James Cusack (Leeds)
- Simon Morykin (Sheffield)
- Simon Pinkham (Nottingham)
- Dave Kelly (Liverpool)
- Mike Toolan (Manchester—17 March)
- Rob Ellis (Manchester—18 March)
- Matt Lissack (Cardiff)
- Dan Kelly (Birmingham—23 March)
- Rob & Katy (Birmingham—24-25 March)
- Steve Power (Bournemouth—28 March)
- Mark Wright (TV personality) (London—30 March)
- Scott Mills (London—31 March-1 April)
- Pete Snodden (Dublin)
- Eoghan McDermott (Belfast)

== Setlist ==
The following setlist was obtained from the concert, held on 17 March 2017, at the Manchester Arena in Manchester, England. It does not represent all concerts during the tour.

1. "You Don't Know Love"
2. "Wrapped Up"
3. "Unpredictable" (with Louisa Johnson)
4. "Grow Up"
5. "Flaws"
6. "Up"
7. "Back Around" (contains excerpts from "What's Love Got to Do with It")
8. "I Need You Now"
9. "Heart Skips a Beat"
10. "24 Hrs"
11. "Deeper"
12. "Dear Darlin'"
13. "That's the Way (I Like It)" / "Never Too Much" / "She's Got That Vibe" / "Jump Around" / "U Can't Touch This" / "Can't Stop the Feeling!"
14. "Troublemaker"
15. "Dance with Me Tonight"

Encore

16. "Kiss Me" (contains elements of "Starving")
17. "Years & Years"

== Tour dates ==
Date	City	Country	Venue
Europe
3 March 2017	Glasgow	Scotland	SSE Hydro
4 March 2017	Glasgow	Scotland	SSE Hydro
6 March 2017	Newcastle	England	Metro Radio Arena
7 March 2017	Newcastle	England	Metro Radio Arena
9 March 2017	Leeds	England	First Direct Arena
10 March 2017	Sheffield	England	Sheffield Arena
11 March 2017	Sheffield	England	Sheffield Arena
13 March 2017	Nottingham	England	Motorpoint Arena
14 March 2017	Nottingham	England	Motorpoint Arena
16 March 2017	Liverpool	England	Echo Arena
17 March 2017	Manchester	England	Manchester Arena
18 March 2017	Manchester	England	Manchester Arena
20 March 2017	Cardiff	Wales	Motorpoint Arena
21 March 2017	Cardiff	Wales	Motorpoint Arena
23 March 2017	Birmingham	England	Genting Arena
24 March 2017	Birmingham	England	Genting Arena
25 March 2017	Birmingham	England	Genting Arena
27 March 2017^{[A]}	London	England	Royal Albert Hall
28 March 2017	Bournemouth	England	Windsor Hall
30 March 2017	London	England	The O_{2} Arena
31 March 2017	London	England	The O_{2} Arena
1 April 2017	London	England	The O_{2} Arena
3 April 2017	Dublin	Ireland	3Arena
4 April 2017	Belfast	Northern Ireland	SSE Arena
5 April 2017	Belfast	Northern Ireland	SSE Arena
Asia
28 April 2017	Abu Dhabi	United Arab Emirates	du Forum
Europe
2 June 2017^{[B]}	Market Rasen	England	Market Rasen Racecourse
3 June 2017	Carlisle	England	Brunton Park
10 June 2017	Colchester	England	Weston Homes Community Stadium
16 June 2017^{[C]}	Tetbury	England	Westonbirt Arboretum
23 June 2017^{[C]}	Edwinstowe	England	Sherwood Forest
24 June 2017	Wrexham	Wales	Racecourse Ground
25 June 2017	Worcester	England	New Road
30 June 2017^{[C]}	Brandon	England	Thetford Forest
1 July 2017^{[D]}	York	England	York Racecourse
7 July 2017	Canterbury	England	Spitfire Ground
8 July 2017	Dublin	Ireland	Iveagh Gardens
9 July 2017	Scarborough	England	Scarborough Open Air Theatre
14 July 2017	Northampton	England	County Ground
15 July 2017^{[E]}	Saint Helier	Jersey	Howard Davis Park
16 July 2017	Hove	England	1st Central County Ground
18 July 2017^{[F]}	Edinburgh	Scotland	Edinburgh Castle Esplanade
20 July 2017	Dundee	Scotland	Slessor Gardens
21 July 2017	Aberdeen	Scotland	Outdoor at the AECC
22 July 2017^{[G]}	Inverness	Scotland	Bught Park
29 July 2017	Exminster	England	Powderham Castle
2 August 2017^{[H]}	Lytham	England	Proms Arena
5 August 2017^{[I]}	Bournemouth	England	Kings Park
10 August 2017^{[J]}	Esher	England	Sandown Park Racecourse
11 August 2017^{[J]}	Merseyside	England	Haydock Park Racecourse
12 August 2017	Swansea	Wales	Singleton Park
18 August 2017^{[K]}	Newmarket	England	Newmarket Racecourse
19 August 2017^{[B]}	Newbury	England	Newbury Racecourse
25 August 2017^{[L]}	Overton	England	Laverstoke Park Farm
26 August 2017^{[M]}	Kingham	England	Alex James' Farm
27 August 2017^{[N]}	Portsmouth	England	Victorious Festival

Festivals and other miscellaneous performances

^{A} Teenage Cancer Trust Concert
^{B} Ladies Day
^{C} Forestry Commission Live Music
^{D} Summer Music Saturday
^{E} Sure Big Gig in the Park
^{F} Concerts at the Castle
^{G} Live in the City
^{H} Lytham Festival
^{I} Kings Park Summer Concerts
^{J} An Evening at the Races
^{K} Newmarket Nights
^{L} Carfest South
^{M} Big Feastival
^{N} Victorious Festival

=== Box office score data ===
Venue	City	Tickets sold / available	Gross revenue
SSE Hydro	Glasgow	20,834 / 20,834 (100%)	$1,272,650
Metro Radio Arena	Newcastle	15,397 / 15,397 (100%)	$895,611
First Direct Arena	Leeds	10,917 / 10,917 (100%)	$637,312
Sheffield Arena	Sheffield	23,362 / 23,362 (100%)	$1,337,880
Motorpoint Arena	Nottingham	13,447 / 13,447 (100%)	$800,572
Echo Arena	Liverpool	9,397 / 9,397 (100%)	$572,906
Manchester Arena	Manchester	26,362 / 26,362 (100%)	$1,587,440
Motorpoint Arena	Cardiff	12,837 / 12,837 (100%)	$687,358
Genting Arena	Birmingham	33,849 / 33,849 (100%)	$2,045,570
Windsor Hall	Bournemouth	5,698 / 5,698 (100%)	$344,032
The O_{2} Arena	London	42,833 / 42,833 (100%)	$2,679,570
3Arena	Dublin	8,527 / 8,527 (100%)	$525,470
SSE Arena	Belfast	14,123 / 14,123 (100%)	$816,321
TOTAL		237,583 / 237,583 (100%)	$14,202,692

Accolades

- Ranked #1 on Billboard's "Hot Tours" for the week ending on 18 April 2017.
