= Daniel Davidsen =

Danish-Norwegian guitarist (born 1978)

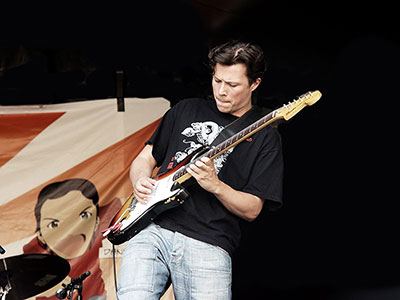
- Davidsen in 2014

Background information
- Born: Daniel Heløy Davidsen; 30 December 1978 (age 47); Copenhagen, Denmark
- Genres: Jazz; rock; pop
- Occupations: Musician, composer, music producer
- Instrument: Guitar
- Label: Stunt
- Member of: JazzKamikaze

Daniel Heløy Davidsen (born 30 December 1978 in Copenhagen) is a Danish-Norwegian guitarist. He is known for his participation in bands like Czesław Śpiewa and JazzKamikaze and many record appearances as a studio musician, with artists like Selena Gomez and Kylie Minogue.

== Career ==
Daniel Davidsen was born in Denmark to Norwegian parents. He was educated at Copenhagen Rhythmic Music Conservatory and gained experience in a wide variety of genres, from rock/pop to country, hardcore fusion, hip-hop, Balkan, world music and jazz. He has mainly played as a session musician for such as Nexus (Nik & Jay and others), Tue West (both record album and live), Tescu Value, Bombay Rockers and the Joker. As a member of the band JazzKamikaze, he has made appearances at Kongsberg Jazzfestival and Moldejazz, internationally at North Sea Jazz Festival, Bangkok Jazz Festival, Rochester Jazz Festival, and the opening of the annual Rio Carnival in Rio de Janeiro.

== Discography ==
As part of JazzKamikaze

- 2005: Mission I, (Stunt)
- 2007: Travelling at the speed of sound, (Stunt)
- 2008: Emerging pilots EP, (SevenSeas)
- 2009: The revolution's in your hands EP, (SevenSeas)
- 2010: Supersonic revolutions, (SevenSeas)
- 2012: The Return of JazzKamikaze (Stunt)

=== Songwriting and production credits ===
Title	Year	Artist(s)	Album	Credits	Written with	Produced with
"Get Outta My Way"	2010	Kylie Minogue	Aphrodite	Co-writer/Producer	Damon Reinagle, Lucas Secon, Peter Wallevik, Mich Hansen	Peter Wallevik, Cutfather, Stuart Price, Lucas, Damon Sharpe
"Go Hard or Go Home"	2010	Kylie Minogue	Aphrodite	Co-writer/Producer	Damon Reinagle, Lucas Secon, Peter Wallevik, Mich Hansen	Peter Wallevik, Cutfather, Thomas Sardorf, Lucas, Damon Sharpe
"Party in My Head"	2011	September	Love CPR	Co-writer/Producer	Lucas Secon, Wayne Hector, Peter Wallevik, Mich Hansen	Peter Wallevik, Cutfather, Lucas
"Think About It"	2011	Melanie C	The Sea	Co-writer/Producer	Melanie Chrisolm, Adam Argyle, Peter Wallevik, Mich Hansen, Jason Gill	Cutfather, Gill
"Burn"	2011	Melanie C	The Sea	Co-writer/Producer	Melanie Chrisolm, Adam Argyle, Peter Wallevik, Mich Hansen, Jason Gill	Cutfather, Gill
"Cruel Intentions"	2011	Melanie C	Think About it EP	Co-writer/Producer	Melanie Chrisolm, Adam Argyle, Peter Wallevik, Mich Hansen, Jason Gill	Cutfather, Gill
"Go Harder"	2011	JLS	Jukebox	Co-writer	Aston Merrygold, Marvin Humes, Oritse Williams, Jonathan Gill, Mich Hansen, Jason Gill, Alexander Tennant	-
"3D"	2011	JLS	Jukebox	Co-writer	Aston Merrygold, Marvin Humes, Oritse Williams, Jonathan Gill, Damon Reinagle, Mich Hansen, Jason Gill	-
"Take You Down"	2011	JLS	Jukebox	Co-writer	Aston Merrygold, Marvin Humes, Oritse Williams, Jonathan Gill, Jason Gill, Alexander Tennant, Talay Riley	-
"This Love Will Survive"	2012	Alexandra Burke	Heartbreak on Hold	Co-writer/Producer	Sonia Clarke, Mich Hansen, Jason Gill	Cutfather, Jason Gill
"Million Miles"	2014	Kylie Minogue	Kiss Me Once	Co-writer/Producer	Chelcee Grimes, Peter Wallevik, Mich Hansen	Peter Wallevik, Cutfather
"Sexy Love"	2014	Kylie Minogue	Kiss Me Once	Co-writer/Producer	Autumn Rowe, Wayne Hector, Peter Wallevik, Mich Hansen	Peter Wallevik, Cutfather
"Up" (featuring Demi Lovato)	2015	Olly Murs	Never Been Better	Co-writer/Producer	Maegan Cottone, Wayne Hector, Peter Wallevik, Mich Hansen	Peter Wallevik, Cutfather, David Quinones, TommyD
"Serious"	2015	Fleur East	Love, Sax and Flashbacks	Co-writer/Producer	Wayne Hector, Peter Wallevik, Mich Hansen	Peter Wallevik, Cutfather
"Need Somebody"	2016	Alex Newell	Non-album single	Co-writer/Producer	Brandyn Burnette, Janee Bennett, Peter Wallevik, Mich Hansen	Peter Wallevik, Cutfather
"False Alarm" (with Becky Hill)	2016	Matoma	Hakuna Matoma / One in a Million	Co-writer/Producer	Thomas Legergren, Rebecca Hill, Kara DioGuardi, James Newman, Peter Wallevik, Mich Hansen	Matoma, Peter Wallevik, Cutfather, MNEK
"Keep It Moving"	2016	Alex Newell	Non-album single	Co-writer/Producer	Brandyn Burnette, Janee Bennett, Peter Wallevik, Mich Hansen	Peter Wallevik, Cutfather
"Unpredictable" (solo / with Louisa Johnson)	2016	Olly Murs	24 HRS	Co-writer/Producer	Kara DioGuardi, Iain Farquharson, Peter Walleik, Mich Hansen	Peter Wallevik, Cutfather
"Nothing Else Matters"	2016	Little Mix	Glory Days	Co-writer/Producer	Camille Purcell, Wayne Hector, Peter Wallevik, Mich Hansen	Peter Wallevik, Cutfather, Freedo, Joe Kearns
"Digital Love" (featuring Hailee Steinfeld)	2017	Digital Farm Animals	Non-album single	Co-writer/Co-producer	Nicholas Gale, Daniel Stein, Willem van Hanegem, Ward van der Harst, James Newman, Peter Wallevik, Mich Hansen	Digital Farm Animals, The Fallen Angels, Peter Wallevik, Cutfather
"Paint Me"	2018	Mamamoo	Yellow Flower EP	Co-writer	Chelcee Grimes, Kara DioGuardi, Peter Wallevik, Mich Hansen	-
"Love"	2018	Kylie Minogue	Golden	Co-writer	Autumn Rowe, Wayne Hector, Peter Wallevik, Mich Hansen	-
"Monday Blues"	2018	EXO-CBX	Blooming Days EP	Co-writer	Maegan Cottone, Iain Farquharson, Peter Wallevik, Mich Hansen	-
"Friends"	2018	Why Don't We	8 Letters	Co-writer/Producer	Edward Drewett, Iain Farquharson, Peter Wallevik, Mich Hansen	Peter Wallevik, Cutfather
"I Need a Night Out"	2018	Chelcee Grimes	Non-album single	Co-writer/Producer	Chelcee Grimes, Kara DioGuardi, Mich Hansen, Kasper Larsen	Cutfather, Kay
"Watch Love Die"	2018	Melo Moreno	Colours	Co-writer	Rebecca Hill, Peter Wallevik, Mich Hansen, Jorgen Elofsson	-
"You Don't Know Me" (with Flo Rida & Shaun Frank featuring Delaney Jane)	2018	Sigala	Brighter Days	Co-writer	Bruce Fielder, Shaun Frank, Tramar Dillard, Janee Bennett, Peter Wallevik, Mich Hansen	-
"Stupid Things" (featuring Saweetie)	2018	Four of Diamonds	Non-album single	Co-writer/Producer	Oladayo Olatunji, Caroline Ailin, Neil Ormandy, Peter Wallevik, Mich Hansen, Diamonte Harper, Gino Borri	Peter Wallevik, Cutfather, Tre Jean-Marie
"Younger"	2018	Olly Murs	You Know I Know	Co-writer/Producer	Oliver Murs, Lucas Secon, Wayne Hector, Peter Wallevik, Mich Hansen	Peter Wallevik, Cutfather
"Love You Better"	2018	Olly Murs	You Know I Know	Co-writer/Producer	Oliver Murs, Lucas Secon, Wayne Hector, Peter Wallevik, Mich Hansen	Peter Wallevik, Cutfather
"Loaded Gun"	2018	Boyzone	Thank You & Goodnight	Co-writer/Producer	Camille Purcell, Edward Drewett, Peter Wallevik, Mich Hansen	Peter Wallevik, Cutfather
"Anyone I Want to Be"	2018	Roksana Węgiel	Roksana Węgiel	Co-writer/Producer	Nathan Duvall, Maegan Cottone, Peter Wallevik, Mich Hansen, Małgorzata Uściłowska, Patryk Kumór	Peter Wallevik, Cutfather
"Shame on You"	2019	Claire Richards	My Wildest Dreams	Co-writer	Karen Harding, Chelcee Grimes, Peter Wallevik, Mich Hansen	-
"365" (with Katy Perry)	2019	ZEDD	Non-album single	Co-writer/Producer	Anton Zaslavski, Katheryn Hudson, Caroline Ailin, Corey Sanders, Peter Wallevik, Mich Hansen	ZEDD, Peter Wallevik, Cutfather
"Don’t make me laugh"	2019	Oh Ha-young	Oh!	Co-producer	-	Mich Hansen, Peter Wallevik, Caroline Ailin
"Devil"	2019	CLC	Non-album single	Co-producer	-	Mich Hansen, Peter Wallevik, Phil Plested, Lauren Aquilina
"Magic"	2020	Kylie Minogue	Disco	Co-writer	Kylie Minogue, Michelle Buzz, Peter Wallevik, Teemu Brunila	-
"Impressionable"	2020	Taemin	Never Gonna Dance Again	Co-writer/producer	Peter Wallevik, Lewis Blissett, MNEK	Peter Wallevik
"Can't Stop Writing Songs About You"	2021	Kylie Minogue and Gloria Gaynor	Disco: Guest List Edition	Co-writer	Peter Wallevik, Iain James, Sinéad Harnett	-
"Advice"	2021	Taemin	Advice	Co-writer	Cutfather, Peter Wallevik, Lucas Secon, Wayne Hector	-
"1, 2, 7 (Time Stops)"	2022	NCT 127	2 Baddies	Co-writer	Peter Wallevik, Iain James	-
"Agit"	2023	Purple Kiss	Cabin Fever	Co-producer	Dosie, Goeun, Yuki	Mich Hansen, Peter Wallevik, Chelcee Grimes, Kara DioGuardi
"Get A Guitar"	2023	Riize	Non-album single	Co-producer	Shin Na-ri (ARTiffect), Bang Hye-hyeon (Jamfactory)	Peter Wallevik, Ben Samama, David Arkwright
"Green Light"	2023	Kylie Minogue	Tension	Co-writer/producer	Peter Wallevik, Ruby Spiro	Peter Wallevik
"Hands"	2023	Kylie Minogue	Tension	Co-writer	Mich Hansen, Kasper Larsen, Ryan Ashley	Cutfather, KayAndMusic, Ryan Ashley
"Can't Say Goodbye"	2023	Key	Good & Great	Co-writer/producer	Peter Wallevik, Iain James, Chelcee Grimes	Peter Wallevik
"On My Youth"	2023	WayV	On My Youth	Co-writer/producer	Peter Wallevik, Mich Hansen, Jin Jin, Bobii Lewis, Wayne Hector, Teshaun Armstrong, Rick Bridges	Peter Wallevik
