= You Know I Know (album) =

Studio album / greatest hits album by Olly Murs
- Released: 9 November 2018
- Recorded: 2010–2018
- Length: 77:53; 37:15 (I Know); 40:38 (You Know)
- Label: RCA
- Producer: Steve Robson; Jordan Riley; TMS; Simon Hale; Phil Cook; Darren Lewis; Daniel Heløy Davidsen; Peter Wallevik; Cutfather; Jim Eliot; Steve Mac; Matt Zara; Digital Farm Animals; The Six; Aaron Hibell; Iyiola Babalola; David Quinones; TommyD; Pete Whitfield; T-Collar; Banx & Ranx; Future Cut; Tunde Babalola; Matt Rad; R I T U A L; Adam Argyle; Martin Brammer

Olly Murs chronology
24 Hrs (2016)	You Know I Know (2018)	Marry Me (2022)

Singles from You Know I Know
- 1. "Moves" Released: 28 September 2018

You Know I Know is the sixth studio album by English singer-songwriter Olly Murs, released on November 9, 2018 through RCA and Sony. It is a double album, consisting of new songs (I Know) and a selection of greatest hits (You Know). The album was certified Gold by the British Phonographic Industry (BPI) in mid-December 2018. Murs toured in May and June 2019 in support of the album. This was Murs's final album under RCA Records.

== Background ==
Murs announced the album on his Twitter and that it would be available to preorder from 5 October 2018. "You Know I Know" is a Double Album. The first disc includes 14 new songs including the lead single "Moves" written by Ed Sheeran and featuring Snoop Dogg and the title track featuring Shaggy. "Moves" also features in the film Johnny English Strikes Again. Murs worked with producers and songwriters Steve Mac and Steve Robson along with songwriter Wayne Hector on the album. Along with working with Snoop Dogg on "Moves" and Shaggy on the title track, Murs recruited Nile Rodgers to contribute guitar to the song "Feel the Same".

== Promotion ==
=== Singles ===
"Moves" was released as the lead single from the album on 28 September 2018. It features American rapper Snoop Dogg and appeared in the film Johnny English Strikes Again.

=== Promotional singles ===
"Take Your Love" was released as first promotional single on 26 October 2018 with an audio video uploaded the same day. "Mark on My Heart" was uploaded as a second promotional single on 2 November 2018. "Excuses" was released as fourth promotional single 4 December 2018. The album's fifth promotional single "Feel the Same" was released on 22 March 2019.

=== Tour ===
You Know I Know Tour
- Tour by Olly Murs
- Associated album: You Know I Know
- Start date: 1 May 2019
- End date: 7 June 2019
- Legs: 1
- No. of shows: 19

Olly Murs concert chronology
- 24 Hours Tour (2017); You Know I Know Tour (2019); Summer Tour (2021)

Murs announced a 2019 UK and Ireland arena tour on 9 October 2018. The tour originally had 16 dates, which went on sale on 12 October 2018. On 22 October Murs added extra dates in Glasgow, Nottingham and Birmingham. The opening act for the tour will be X Factor alumni Rak-Su.

==== Set list ====
This set list is from the concert on 10 May 2019 in Birmingham. It may not represent all shows from the tour.

1. "Moves / Shape of You" (Ed Sheeran cover)
2. "Feel the Same"
3. "Kiss Me"
4. "Maria"
5. "You Don't Know Love (Remix)"
6. "You Know I Know / It Wasn't Me" (Shaggy cover)
7. "Talking to Yourself"
8. "Superstition" (Stevie Wonder cover)
9. "Thinking of Me"
10. "What Makes You Beautiful" (One Direction cover)
11. "I Wan'na Be Like You (The Monkey Song)" (From “The Jungle Book”)
12. "That Girl"
13. "Please Don't Let Me Go"
14. "Heart Skips a Beat / Freed From Desire" (Gala cover)
15. "Dear Darlin'"
16. "Up"
17. "Troublemaker"
18. "Wrapped Up"
19. "Dance with Me Tonight"

==== Tour dates ====
List of concerts, showing date, city, country, venue and opening acts
Date	City	Country	Venue	Attendance	Revenue
Europe
1 May 2019	Aberdeen	Scotland	BHGE Arena	—	—
3 May 2019	Glasgow	Scotland	SSE Hydro	18,454 / 18,454	$1,181,330
4 May 2019	Glasgow	Scotland	SSE Hydro	18,454 / 18,454	$1,181,330
6 May 2019	Nottingham	England	Motorpoint Arena	—	—
7 May 2019	Nottingham	England	Motorpoint Arena	—	—
9 May 2019	Bournemouth	England	Bournemouth International Centre	—	—
10 May 2019	Birmingham	England	Resorts World Arena	—	—
11 May 2019	Birmingham	England	Resorts World Arena	—	—
17 May 2019	London	England	The O2 Arena	26,998 / 30,749	$1,822,263
18 May 2019	London	England	The O2 Arena	26,998 / 30,749	$1,822,263
20 May 2019	Newcastle	England	Utilita Arena Newcastle	—	—
21 May 2019	Hull	England	Bonus Arena	—	—
23 May 2019	Leeds	England	First Direct Arena	—	—
24 May 2019	Sheffield	England	FlyDSA Arena	—	—
27 May 2019	Brighton	England	Brighton Centre	—	—
28 May 2019	Cardiff	Wales	Motorpoint Arena	—	—
30 May 2019	Liverpool	England	M&S Bank Arena	—	—
31 May 2019	Manchester	England	Manchester Arena	13,646 / 13,646	$839,671
7 June 2019	Gloucester	England	Kingsholm Stadium	—	—
Total				59,098 / 62,849 (94%)	$3,843,264

== Track listing ==
Disc one – I Know
No.	Title	Writer(s)	Producer(s)	Length
1.	"Moves" (featuring Snoop Dogg)	Edward Sheeran; Steve McCutcheon; Ammar Malik; Calvin Broadus	Steve Mac	2:45
2.	"Go Hard"	Oliver Murs; Thomas Barnes; Peter Kelleher; Benjamin Kohn; Camille Purcell	TMS	3:08
3.	"Love Me Again"	Murs; Steve Robson; Purcell; Wayne Hector	Steve Robson; Jordan Riley	2:50
4.	"Excuses"	Murs; Robson; Grace Barker	Robson; Matt Zara^{[b]}; Simon Hale^{[c]}	4:06
5.	"You Know I Know" (featuring Shaggy)	Murs; Robson; Claude Kelly; Hector	Robson	3:07
6.	"Feel the Same"	Murs; Nile Rodgers; Robson; Edward Drewett; Barker; Nicholas Gale	Robson; Digital Farm Animals	3:11
7.	"Somebody New"	Murs; Robson; Kelly; Hector	Robson; Riley	2:46
8.	"Mark On My Heart"	Murs; Robson; Kelly; Hector	Robson; Riley^{[b]}	2:49
9.	"Take Your Love"	Murs; Robson; Hector; Iain Farquarson	Robson	3:33
10.	"Maria"	Murs; Richard Boardman; Pablo Bowman; Sarah Blanchard	The Six; Aaron Hibell	3:18
11.	"Talking to Yourself"	Murs; Robson; Caroline Ailin; Hector	Robson; Hale^{[c]}	2:34
12.	"Younger"	Murs; Daniel Heløy Davidsen; Peter Wallevik; Mich Hansen; Hector; Lucas Secon	Davidson; Wallevik; Cutfather	3:08
Total length:				37:15

Disc one – Deluxe edition bonus tracks
No.	Title	Writer(s)	Producer(s)	Length
13.	"Love You Better"	Murs; Davidsen; Wallevik; Hansen; Hector; Secon	Davidsen; Wallevik; Cutfather	3:41
14.	"Footsteps"	Murs; Barnes; Kelleher; Kohn; James Newman	TMS; Phil Cook	3:41
Total length:				44:37

Disc two – You Know
No.	Title	Writer(s)	Producer(s)	Length
1.	"Dance with Me Tonight"	Murs; Robson; Kelly	Iyiola Babalola; Robson; Darren Lewis	3:23
2.	"Troublemaker" (featuring Flo Rida)	Murs; Robson; Kelly; Breyan Isaac; Tramar Dillard	Robson	3:05
3.	"Up" (featuring Demi Lovato)	Davidsen; Wallevik; Hansen; Hector; Maegan Cottone	Davidsen; Wallevik; Cutfather; David Quinones; TommyD	3:44
4.	"Heart Skips a Beat" (featuring Rizzle Kicks)	Alexander Smith; Samuel Preston; Jim Eliot; Jordan Stephens; Harley Alexander-Sule	Eliot	3:23
5.	"Dear Darlin'"	Murs; Eliot; Edward Drewett	Eliot	3:26
6.	"Wrapped Up" (featuring Travie McCoy)	Murs; Travie McCoy; Robson; Kelly	Robson; Pete Whitfield^{[c]}	3:05
7.	"You Don't Know Love"	Murs; Robson; Camille Purcell; Hector	Robson; T-Collar	3:19
8.	"Kiss Me"	Murs; Robson; Zacharie Raymond; Yannick Rastogi; Gary Derussy; Lindy Robbins; Taio Cruz	Banx & Ranx; Robson	3:19
9.	"Please Don't Let Me Go"	Murs; Robson; Kelly	Robson; Future Cut	3:24
10.	"Thinking of Me"	Murs; Robson; Hector	Tunde Babalola; Robson; Lewis	3:26
11.	"Unpredictable" (with Louisa Johnson)	Kara DioGuardi; Davidsen; Wallevik; Hansen; Farquarson	Davidsen; Wallevik; Cutfather; Matt Rad	3:19
12.	"Grow Up"	Murs; Robson; Purcell; Hector	Robson; R I T U A L	3:45
Total length:				40:38

Disc two – Deluxe edition bonus tracks
No.	Title	Writer(s)	Producer(s)	Length
13.	"Busy"	Murs; Adam Argyle; Martin Brammer	Argyle; Brammer	3:00
14.	"Right Place Right Time"	Murs; Robson; Kelly	Robson	3:13
Total length:				46:51

== Charts ==
=== Weekly charts ===
Weekly chart performance for You Know I Know
Chart (2018)	Peak position
German Albums (Offizielle Top 100)	75
Irish Albums (IRMA)	10
Scottish Albums (OCC)	2
Swiss Albums (Schweizer Hitparade)	56
UK Albums (OCC)	2

=== Year-end charts ===
2018 year-end chart performance for You Know I Know
Chart (2018)	Position
UK Albums (OCC)	28

2019 year-end chart performance for You Know I Know
Chart (2019)	Position
UK Albums (OCC)	52

== Certifications ==
Certifications for You Know I Know
Region	Certification	Certified units/sales
Singapore (RIAS)	Gold	5,000^{*}
United Kingdom (BPI)	Platinum	300,000^{‡}
^{*} Sales figures based on certification alone.^{‡} Sales+streaming figures based on certification alone.
