= Save Me (Olly Murs song) =

Single by Olly Murs

from the album Knees Up
- Released: 25 July 2025
- Recorded: 2024
- Genre: Ska
- Length: 2:54
- Label: ICYDK; BMG; Warner Chappell Music
- Songwriters: Sky Adams; Ed Drewett; Olly Murs; James New
- Producer: Sky Adams

Olly Murs singles chronology
"I Found Her" (2023)	"Save Me" (2025)	"Bonkers" (2025)

"Save Me" is a song by English singer-songwriter Olly Murs. It was released jointly through Murs' imprint ICYDK, BMG and Warner Chappell Music as the lead single from his eighth studio album, Knees Up. Written by Murs, Sky Adams, Ed Drewett, and James New, and produced by Adams, the song tells the story of a man who goes on a wild, debaucherous night out which goes horribly wrong after having an argument with his significant other.

== Background ==
Murs released his seventh studio album, Marry Me, on 2 December 2022 through EMI Records to positive critical and commercial success, becoming his fifth number one on the UK Album Charts. To support the project, he embarked on the Marry Me Tour in 2023. In 2025, he began his 15 Years of Hits Tour, performing "Save Me" live for the first time at Plymouth Pavilions on 24 April 2025.

== Lyrics and composition ==
Describing the song, Murs explained “It’s a song about a guy on a night out after having a row with his missus, and it goes horribly wrong!” He described the writing process as “spontaneous and fun”, and expressed that he feels the song fits well amongst the other upbeat tracks in his discography and live shows, comparing it to earlier hits "Thinking of Me" and "Please Don't Let Me Go" from his 2010 self-titled debut album, and "Heart Skips a Beat" from his 2011 album In Case You Didn't Know. Of the track, he stated that “this is old Olly vibes but the 2.0 version.”

Sonically, "Save Me" is a ska-infused, bass-driven track that was produced by Sky Adams, who also worked on several other songs on Murs' eight album. Adams explained that “with Save Me, we wanted to capture that classic Olly energy while giving it a fresh twist”.

== Live performances ==
Murs performed the song as part of his 15 Years of Hits Tour in 2025. It also was included as part of his set at Radio 2 in the Park at Hylands Park in Chelmsford on 7 September 2025.

== Music video ==
The video for the song premiered on 25 July 2025 and was directed by Nick Suchak and depicts Murs and a group of friends on a drunken night out, beginning at a pool bar before becoming increasingly chaotic as he attempts to reconcile with his partner.

== Charts ==
Weekly chart performance for "Save Me"
Chart (2025)	Peak position
Latvia Airplay (LaIPA)	14
UK Singles Downloads (OCC)	8
