= Years and Years =

Years & Years were a British synth-pop band.

Years and Years may also refer to:

- "Years & Years" (song), a 2016 song by Olly Murs
- Years and Years (TV series), a 2019 British television drama series
