= JazzKamikaze =

Scandinavian jazz band

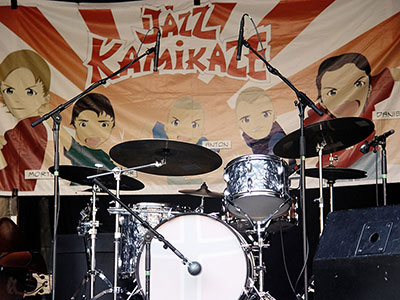

Background information
- Origin: Copenhagen, Denmark
- Genres: Contemporary jazz
- Years active: 2005–present
- Label: Herman
- Members: Morten Schantz; Marius Neset; Daniel Heløy Davidsen; Kristor Brødsgaard; Anton Eger
- Website: Official website

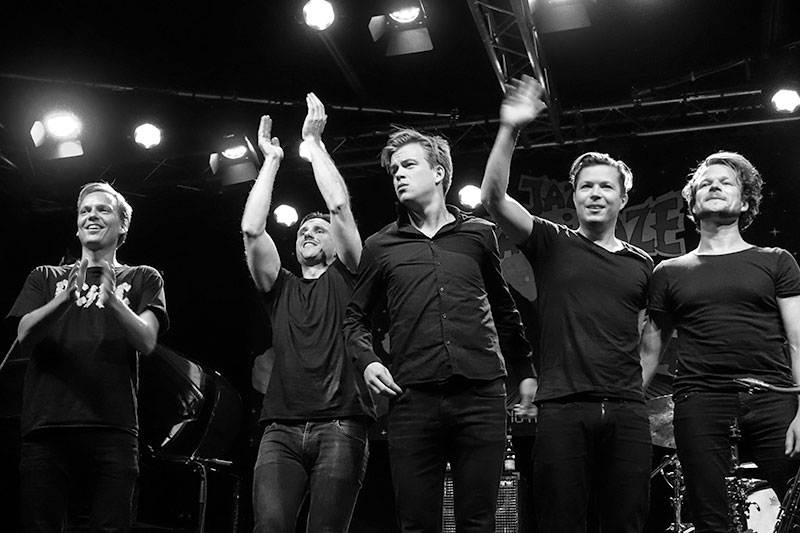
JazzKamikaze during their tenth anniversary concert in 2016

JazzKamikaze is a contemporary jazz band with members from Denmark, Norway, and Sweden.

== Biography ==
It is not easy to describe their music, but it can be said that they play a mix of be-bop, funk, fusion, rock and hip-hop. In Norway they have appeared at Kongsberg Jazzfestival and Moldejazz and internationally at North Sea Jazz Festival, Bangkok Jazz Festival, Rochester Jazz Festival as well as being part of the opening of the annual Rio Carnival in Rio de Janeiro.

Moldejazz presented the band in 2008 as:

... These are young musicians who offer themselves and their talent without significant backpacks and traditions,
where Coltrane and Coldplay are playing hide and seek with each other - and often Genesis and Radiohead lurks in the wings....

== Honors ==
- 2005: Ung Jazz award of the JazzDanmark
- 2005: Young Nordic Jazz Comets

== Discography ==
- 2005: Mission I, (Stunt)
- 2007: Travelling at the Speed of Sound (Stunt)
- 2008: Emerging Pilots (SevenSeas)
- 2009: The Revolution's in Your Hands (SevenSeas)
- 2010: Supersonic Revolutions (SevenSeas)
- 2012: The Return of JazzKamikaze (Stunt)
- 2017: Level (MITU)

== Gallery ==
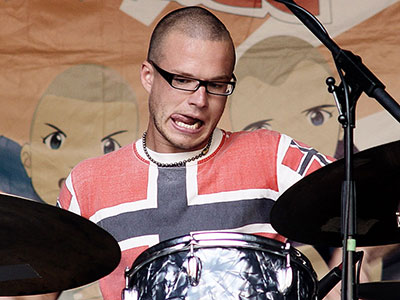

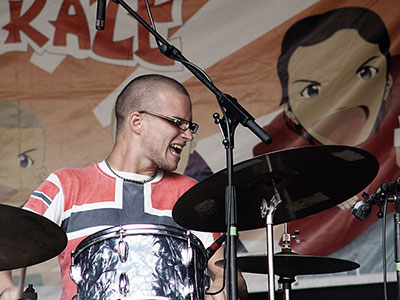

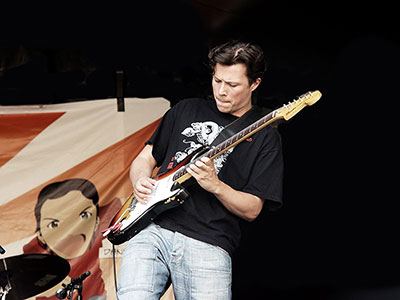

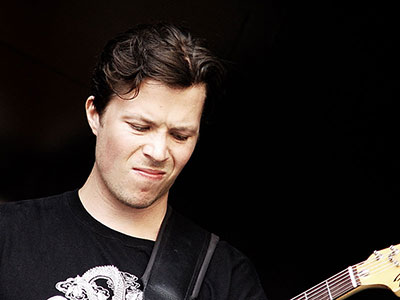

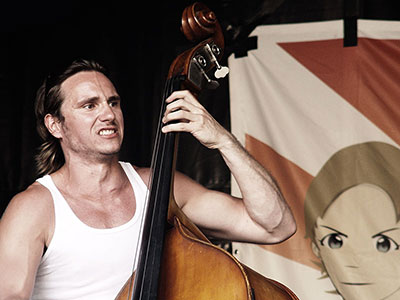

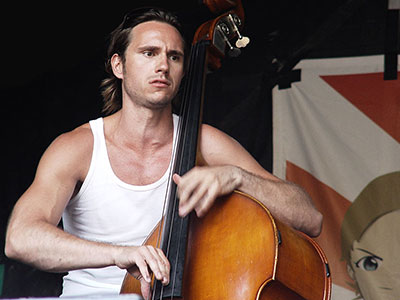

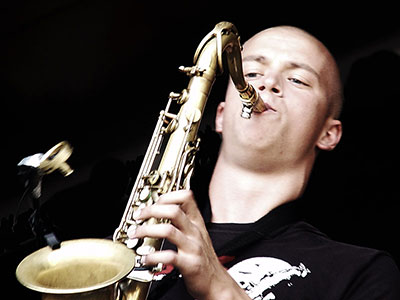

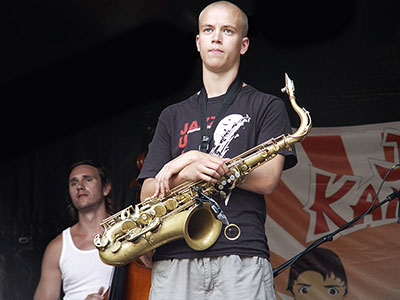

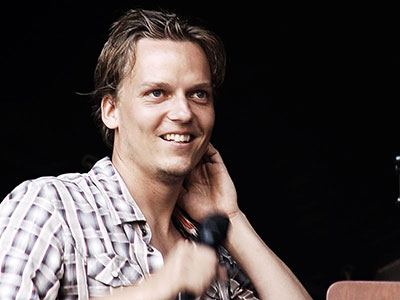

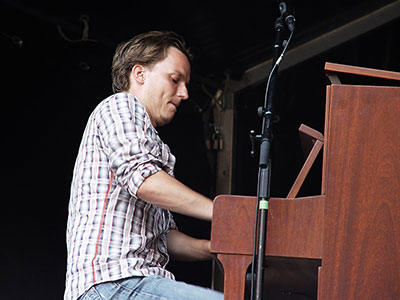

== Personnel ==
- Morten Schantz (1980 Denmark) - piano & vocals
- Marius Neset (1985 Norway) - saxophone
- Daniel Heløy Davidsen (1978 Denmark/Norway) - guitar
- Kristor Brødsgaard (1979 Denmark) - double bass
- Anton Eger (1980 Sweden) - drums
