= Moves (Olly Murs song) =

Single by Olly Murs featuring Snoop Dogg

from the album You Know I Know
- Released: 28 September 2018
- Recorded: 2017
- Genre: Pop; funk
- Length: 2:45
- Label: RCA; Sony
- Songwriters: Edward Sheeran; Steve McCutcheon; Ammar Malik; Calvin Broadus
- Producer: Steve Mac

Olly Murs singles chronology
"More Mess" (2017)	"Moves" (2018)	"Die of a Broken Heart" (2022)

Snoop Dogg singles chronology
"Bounce" (2018)	"Moves" (2018)	"How You Love Me" (2018)

"Moves" is a song performed by English singer Olly Murs, featuring vocals from American rapper and record producer Snoop Dogg. The song was released as a digital download on 28 September 2018 as the lead single from his sixth studio album You Know I Know. The song also features on the Johnny English Strikes Again OST. It was written by Ed Sheeran, Steve Mac, Ammar Malik and Snoop Dogg.

== Background ==
The song is similar to "Feels", by Calvin Harris.

This is the second time that Ed Sheeran has written a song for Murs. The first was "Love Shine Down", a track on Murs' self-titled debut album.

== Critical reception ==
Michael Cragg of The Guardian derided the track, joking that "it's dominated by two things: Ed Sheeran, who co-wrote it, likely demoed it and then emailed it over as willthisdo.mp3; and Snoop Dogg, who was no one's first choice and has literally no idea what's going on".

== Music video ==
A music video to accompany the release of "Moves" was first released onto YouTube on 17 October 2018. It features Murs sneaking into a nightclub with friends while competing in a dance battle.

Rowan Atkinson appears as a bartender serving Murs energy drinks. Snoop Dogg is heard but not seen as he was unable to attend the filming of the video.

Elsie Hewitt an English Supermodel / Actress is also in the said music video.

== Live performances ==
- The X Factor (11 November 2018) featuring Lady Leshurr instead of Snoop Dogg.

== Track listing ==
Digital download
No.	Title	Length
1.	"Moves" (featuring Snoop Dogg)	2:45

== Charts ==
=== Weekly charts ===
Weekly chart performance for "Moves"
Chart (2018–19)	Peak position
Australian Digital Tracks (ARIA)	39
Belgium (Ultratip Bubbling Under Flanders)	28
Belgium (Ultratop 50 Wallonia)	28
Croatia (HRT)	57
Hungary (Editors' Choice Top 40)	32
Iceland (Tónlistinn)	10
Poland Airplay (ZPAV)	13
Romania (Airplay 100)	98
Scotland Singles (Official Charts)	18
UK Singles (Official Charts)	46

=== Year-end charts ===
2019 year-end chart performance for "Moves"
Chart (2019)	Position
Iceland (Tónlistinn)	62

== Certifications ==
Certifications for "Moves"
Region	Certification	Certified units/sales
United Kingdom (BPI)	Silver	200,000^{‡}
^{‡} Sales+streaming figures based on certification alone.

== Release history ==
Release history and formats for "Moves"
Region	Date	Format	Label
United Kingdom	28 September 2018	Digital download; streaming	RCA; Sony
