= Kristor Brødsgaard =

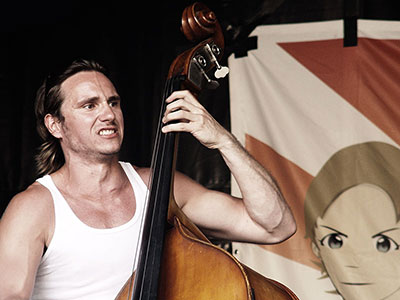

Background information
- Born: Kristor Lybecker Brødsgaard; 1979 (age 46–47); Vedbæk, Zealand
- Origin: Denmark
- Genres: Jazz
- Occupations: Musician, composer
- Instruments: Double bass, bass guitar
- Labels: Stunt, Loop

Kristor Lybecker Brødsgaard (born 1979) is a Danish double bassist known from collaborations with jazz guitarist Tao Højgaard and within JazzKamikaze.

== Career ==
Brødsgaard picked up the double bass in 1992, and was awarded the «Berlingske Tidendes Rytmiske Musikkonkurrence», including bassist Niels-Henning Ørsted Pedersen in the jury. Within the Scandinavian quintet JazzKamikaze he participates on several album releases and appeared at the international jazz festivals Kongsberg Jazzfestival, Moldejazz, North Sea Jazz Festival, Bangkok Jazz Festival, Rochester Jazz Festival as well as being part of the opening of the annual Rio Carnival in Rio de Janeiro.

== Honors ==
- 1999: Winner of the «Berlingske Tidendes Rytmiske Musikkonkurrence»
- 2005: Ung Jazz award of the JazzDanmark
- 2005: Young Nordic Jazz Comets
- 2007: Spearhead in the International Launch of Danish Jazz between 2007 and 2009

== Discography ==
Within JazzKamikaze

- 2005: Mission I, (Stunt)
- 2007: Traveling at the speed of sound, (Stunt)
- 2008: Emerging pilots EP, (SevenSeas)
- 2009: The revolution's in your hands EP, (SevenSeas)
- 2010: Supersonic revolutions, (SevenSeas)
- 2012: The Return of JazzKamikaze (Stunt)

With other

- 2003: I 508 Farver (Cope), within Prinsens Orkester
- 2004: "Trioscope" (Cope), within Trioscope
- 2004: "Play Attention" (Calibrated), within Jan Lippert Ensemble
- 2005: This Is Beyond Criticism (Useless Salvation), within Geeza
- 2006: "Protestsange.dk" (Edel), within various artists
- 2006: "Playing" (Cope), within Jan Lippert Ensemble
- 2009: "Stilletto" (Playground), within Karen
- 2012: "Deeper Than Roots" (Target), within Aisha
- 2013: "Catching the Wave" (Stunt), within Veronica Mortensen Band

As featured artist

- 2011: Tribute (Carsten Lindholm), with Carsten Lindholm (9th Gate)
