= Morten Schantz =

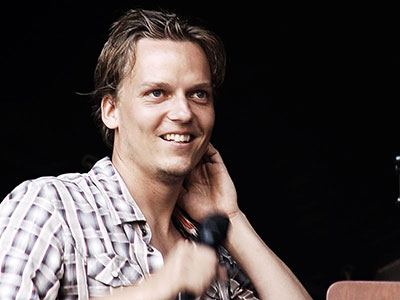
- Morten Schantz in 2014

Background information
- Born: Morten Silberg Schantz; 19 October 1980 (age 45); Aarhus, Jylland, Denmark
- Genres: Jazz
- Occupations: Musician, composer, band leader
- Instruments: Piano, vocals
- Labels: Rune Grammofon, Bolage, Edition
- Website: mortenschantz.com

Morten Silberg Schantz (born 19 October 1980) is a Danish jazz pianist.

== Career ==
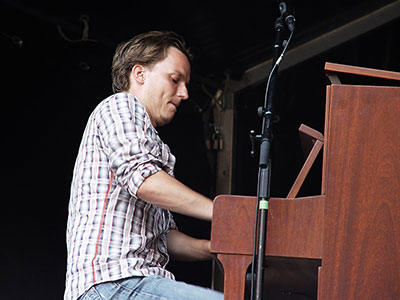
Morten Schantz in 2014.

Schantz was raised in Kalundborg, where he started playing classical piano at the age of 6 years but eventually had motivation problems in early adolescence. While getting a new and inspiring teacher, he got back motivation and was introduced to jazz. He was quickly inspired by bands and musicians like Weather Report, Miles Davis, McCoy Tyner, Chick Corea, David Sanborn, and Herbie Hancock.

Schantz formed his first trio as band leader in 1997, and they got the opportunity to play gigs at local clubs and released their first demo album Cantaloupe Island, the year after. In 1998 he formed The Morten Schantz Segment including his earlier so inspiring teacher, Mikkel Uhrenholdt (saxophone) and Jesper Thomsen (drums).

In 2001 he joined the band Mikhalized where he contributed the debut album Jazz Muffin (2003) In 2005 he started the highly acclaimed band JazzKamikaze with musicians from Denmark, Sweden and Norway, and that same year they received the award Young Nordic Jazz Comets. They have performed at jazz festivals around the world.

In July 2015 his band Godspeed debuted at the Copenhagen Jazz Festival venue Huset, Musikcaféen in Copenhagen, Denmark. The band is a trio with Marius Neset and Anton Eger. The album Morten Schantz Godspeed with Marius Neset on sax and Anton Eger on drums was released by Edition Records in January 2017. In All About Jazz, Roger Farbey wrote, "Godspeed unceasingly rewards repeated plays and easily qualifies as one of the most exciting and engaging recordings for a long time. Schantz has surely now found his true métier."

== Awards and honors ==
- 2005: Young Nordic Jazz Comets, within the band JazzKamikaze

== Discography ==
=== As leader ===
- 2014: Unicorn (Calibrated Music)
- 2017: Godspeed (Edition)
- 2022: Passenger (April Records)

With Schantz Segment

- 2006: Return From Exile

=== Collaborations ===
With Mikhalized

- 2003: Jazz Muffin

With JazzKamikaze

- 2005: Mission I (Stunt)
- 2007: Travelling at the Speed of Sound (Stunt)
- 2008: Emerging Pilots (SevenSeas)
- 2009: The Revolution's in Your Hands (SevenSeas)
- 2010: Supersonic Revolutions (SevenSeas)
- 2012: The Return of JazzKamikaze (Stunt)
