= Knees Up =

Studio album by Olly Murs
- Released: 21 November 2025
- Genre: Ska, pop
- Length: 34:38
- Label: BMG
- Producer: Sky Adams, Matty Benbrook, Dave Benkel, Matt James, Mark Taylor

Olly Murs chronology
Marry Me (2022)	Knees Up (2025)

Singles from Knees Up
- 1. "Save Me" Released: 24 July 2025; 2. "Bonkers" Released: 26 September 2025; 3. "Run This Town" Released: 24 October 2025

Knees Up is the eighth studio album by English singer Olly Murs. It was released on 21 November 2025 via BMG Rights Management. It reached number five on the UK Albums Chart.

== Release ==
The album was preceded by the lead single "Save Me", released in April 2025. Murs confirmed the album's release in October 2025, coinciding with a second single, "Bonkers". A deluxe version of the album includes live recordings of the songs "Troublemaker", "Heart Skips a Beat", "Save Me", and "Dance with Me Tonight".

== Critical reception ==
Entertainment Focus writer Pip Ellwood-Hughes gave the album 2.5 stars out of 5, stating that "there’s nothing wrong with it per se but it’s all just a little bit safe and underwhelming." Emma Clarendon of Love London Love Culture was also mixed, writing that "Overall, there are plenty of highlights on the album but it feels that it is slightly all over the place emotionally and in terms of the tone that means it doesn’t feel quite coherent as a whole."

== Track listing ==
1. "Knees Up" (Olly Murs, Iain James, Sky Adams) - 2:25
2. "Save Me" (Murs, Adams, Ed Drewett, James New) - 2:54
3. "Guilty" (Murs, Adams, Matt James, New) - 2:42
4. "Bonkers" (Murs, Adams, Drewett, New) - 2:23
5. "Honest" (Murs, Adams, I. James, New) - 2:27
6. "Love = Madness" (Murs, Adams, Drewett, New) - 3:02
7. "Run This Town" (Samuel Preston, Mark Taylor) - 3:44
8. "Yesterday's News" (Murs, Adams, Drewett) - 2:51
9. "Cut to the Chase" (Alice Backstrom, Matty Benbrook) - 3:35
10. "Still Getting Used (To the Ring)" (Murs, Adams, I. James, New) - 2:34
11. "Lovin' Really Hurts" (Murs, Adams, M. James, New, Dave Benkel) - 2:59
12. "Chin Up" (Murs, Benbrook, Backstrom, Drewett) - 3:14

All tracks produced by Sky Adams except:

- "Run This Town" produced by Mark Taylor
- "Cut to the Chase" and "Chin Up" produced by Matty Benbrook
- "Lovin' Really Hurts" co-produced by Dave Benkel and Matt James

== Chart performance ==
Chart performance for Knees Up
Chart (2025)	Peak position
Scottish Albums (OCC)	5
UK Albums (OCC)	5
UK Independent Albums (OCC)	1
