= Marry Me (Olly Murs album) =

Studio album by Olly Murs
- Released: 2 December 2022
- Recorded: 2020–2022
- Length: 37:17
- Label: ICYDK; EMI
- Producer: David Stewart

Olly Murs chronology
You Know I Know (2018)	Marry Me (2022)	Knees Up (2025)

Singles from Marry Me
- 1. "Die of a Broken Heart" Released: 7 October 2022; 2. "I Hate You When You're Drunk" Released: 25 November 2022; 3. "I Found Her" Released: 24 February 2023

Marry Me is the seventh studio album by the English singer-songwriter Olly Murs, released on 2 December 2022 by Murs' imprint ICYDK and EMI Records. Following the release of his sixth album, You Know I Know, Murs had no interest in making any new music, until he met his wife, Amelia Tank. Murs returned to writing during late 2020 until early 2022. It’s the only album that Murs released under EMI.

The album was preceded by the release of two singles. The lead single "Die of a Broken Heart" was released on 7 October, followed by the second single "I Hate You When You're Drunk" on 25 November.

Marry Me received generally positive reviews from critics and was a commercial success. In Murs's native United Kingdom it debuted at number one on the UK Albums Chart, becoming Murs's fifth number-one album on the chart.

== Background and promotion ==
Murs announced in early 2022 that he would be releasing his seventh studio album titled Marry Me. In early September, Murs said that a single would be out soon and later put a teaser on his TikTok of the single "Die of a Broken Heart", a 15-second snippet of the pre-chorus and chorus. Within the first day over 100 videos had used the sound. In November, Murs released a video of him watching the World Cup on his TikTok and labelled it "Where's Wally??? Celebrating that he's got a new single coming out this Friday." This also included a 15-second snippet on his single "I Hate You When You're Drunk".

== Tour ==
In April 2023, Murs began an arena tour throughout the UK. He also announced he would hold a 2023 summer tour. The tour was supported by Scouting for Girls.

=== Set list ===
This set list is taken from the concert in London on the 29th April 2024. It may not represent all shows from the tour

1. "Marry Me / I'm Still Standing (Elton John)"
2. "Best Night of Your Life"
3. "You Don't Know Love"
4. "Kiss Me / Watermelon Sugar" (Harry Styles)
5. "Right Place Right Time"
6. "I Found Her"
7. "Thinking Of Me" (feat. Professor Green)
8. "Sweet Caroline"(Neil Diamond)
9. "Dear Darlin'"
10. "I Hate You When You're Drunk"
11. "Heart Skips A Beat / We Found Love"
12. "Wrapped Up"
13. "Dancing On Cars"
14. "Celebration / YMCA / Blame It On The Boogie / Don't Stop Believin' / Sex On Fire / I Want It That Way / Dancing On The Ceiling
15. "Dance With Me Tonight"
16. "Troublemaker" (encore)

== Track listing ==
Marry Me track listing
No.	Title	Writer(s)	Length
1.	"Die of a Broken Heart"	Olly Murs; David Stewart	3:26
2.	"I Found Her"	Murs; Stewart; Jessica Agombar	3:08
3.	"Go Ghost"	Murs; Stewart; Agombar	2:54
4.	"25"	Murs; Stewart; Agombar	3:28
5.	"Dancing on Cars"	Stewart; Agombar; Bradley Simpson	3:30
6.	"Do Me Like That"	Murs; Stewart; Agombar	3:05
7.	"Marry Me"	Stewart; Agombar; Simpson	3:14
8.	"Best Night of Your Life"	Murs; Stewart; Agombar	3:52
9.	"I Hate You When You're Drunk"	Murs; Stewart; Agombar	3:37
10.	"Don't Stop Dancing"	Murs; Stewart; Agombar	3:26
11.	"Let Me Just Say"	Murs; Stewart; Agombar	3:32
Total length:			37:17

== Charts ==
Chart performance for Marry Me
Chart (2022)	Peak position
Irish Albums (IRMA)	55
Scottish Albums (OCC)	1
UK Albums (OCC)	1
