= Years & Years (song) =

Single by Olly Murs

from the album 24 Hrs
- Released: 9 December 2016
- Recorded: 2016
- Genre: Pop
- Length: 4:02 (album version) 3:40 (video version/radio edit)
- Label: Epic Records
- Songwriter(s): Olly Murs; Steve Mac; Wayne Hector
- Producer(s): Steve Mac

Olly Murs singles chronology
"Grow Up" (2016)	"Years & Years" (2016)	"Unpredictable" (2017)

"Years & Years" is a song performed by English singer-songwriter Olly Murs. The song was released as a digital download in the United Kingdom on 9 December 2016 as the third single from his fifth studio album 24 Hrs (2016). The song has peaked at number 83 on the UK Singles Chart.

== Music video ==
A music video to accompany the release of "Years & Years" was first released onto YouTube on 16 December 2016 at a total length of three minutes and forty-one seconds.

== Track listing ==
- Digital Download (Remixes) - EP
1. "Years & Years" (Jack Wins Remix Radio Edit) — 2:57
2. "Years & Years" (Jack Wins Remix Club Edit) — 5:53
3. "Years & Years" (Nick Talos Remix Radio Edit) — 3:12
4. "Years & Years" (Nick Talos Remix Club Edit) — 3:45

== Charts ==
Chart (2017)	Peak position
UK Singles (OCC)	83

== Release history ==
Region	Date	Format	Label
United Kingdom	9 December 2016	Digital download	Sony, Epic
