= Grow Up (Olly Murs song) =

Single by Olly Murs

from the album 24 Hrs
- Released: 7 October 2016
- Recorded: 2016
- Genre: Pop
- Length: 3:45
- Label: Epic Records
- Songwriter(s): Olly Murs; Steve Robson; Camille Purcell; Wayne Hector
- Producer(s): Steve Robson

Olly Murs singles chronology
"You Don't Know Love" (2016)	"Grow Up" (2016)	"Years & Years" (2016)

"Grow Up" is a song performed by English singer-songwriter Olly Murs. The song was released as a digital download in the United Kingdom on 7 October 2016 as the second single from his fifth studio album 24 Hrs (2016). The song has peaked at number 25 on the UK Singles Chart. The song was written by Olly Murs, Steve Robson, Camille Purcell, Wayne Hector.

== Chart performance ==
"Grow Up" debuted outside of the top-forty on the UK Singles Chart at number 52. In its second week it dropped to number 56 but later rebounded to number 53 in its third week. In its fourth week it dropped a place to number 54 and then in its fifth week it dropped even further to 61. At this point, the song's chart success looked bleak. However Murs performed the song on The X Factor UK on 13 November 2016, resulting in the single climbing up the charts to number 25 (its peak) in its sixth week of release.

== Music video ==
A music video to accompany the release of "Grow Up" was first released onto YouTube on 12 October 2016 at a total length of four minutes and five seconds.

The video features Murs filming the video with the crew made up of children.

== Charts ==
Chart (2016–17)	Peak position
Germany (GfK)	94
Hungary (Rádiós Top 40)	29
Ireland (IRMA)	48
Scotland (OCC)	8
Slovakia (Rádio Top 100)	51
UK Singles (OCC)	25

== Certifications ==
Region	Certification	Certified units/sales
United Kingdom (BPI)	Silver	200,000^{‡}
^{‡} Sales+streaming figures based on certification alone.

== Release history ==
Region	Date	Format	Label	Ref
United Kingdom	7 October 2016	Digital download	Epic	
Italy	4 November 2016	Contemporary hit radio	Sony	
