= 24 Hrs (album) =

2016 studio album by Olly Murs

Studio album by Olly Murs
- Released: 11 November 2016
- Recorded: 2015–2016
- Genre: Pop
- Length: 40:19
- Label: RCA; Syco
- Producer: Cutfather; Daniel Davidsen; Carl Falk; Steve Mac; Matt Rad; William Ristorp; Steve Robson; TMS; Peter Wallevik; MNEK

Olly Murs chronology
Never Been Better (2014)	24 Hrs (2016)	You Know I Know (2018)

Singles from 24 Hrs
- 1. "You Don't Know Love" Released: 8 July 2016; 2. "Grow Up" Released: 7 October 2016; 3. "Years & Years" Released: 9 December 2016; 4. "Unpredictable" Released: 31 May 2017; 5. "That Girl" Released: 9 April 2019

24 Hrs is the fifth studio album by English recording artist Olly Murs, released through RCA Records on 11 November 2016. The album features the Platinum-certified UK top 20 hit "You Don't Know Love" and UK top-forty singles "Grow Up" and "Unpredictable" . Commercially, the album debuted atop the UK Albums Chart giving Murs his fourth UK number-one album.

== Promotion ==
=== Tour ===
In September 2016 Olly Murs announced he would embark on a UK Tour, called the Spring & Summer Tour 2017.

== Singles ==
The lead single from the album, "You Don't Know Love", peaked at number 15 on the UK Singles Chart. The second single, "Grow Up" was released on 7 October 2016 and it peaked at number 25 in the UK Singles Chart.

On 18 November 2016, after the news of the album going to number 1, Murs did a Facebook Live stream and announced that "Years & Years" would be a new single off the album.

The fourth single was announced to be "Unpredictable", which was re-released as a collaboration with Murs' fellow The X Factor contestant (and winner), Louisa Johnson. The release date of the new version was 31 May 2017.

=== Promotional singles ===
"Back Around" was made available before the album's release as an instant gratification track on 4 November 2016.

== Critical reception ==
Neil Z. Yeung of AllMusic gave the album three and a half stars in his review, writing "24 Hrs continues Olly Murs maturation, shedding some of his former pop/rock sound in favor of tighter dance-pop sheen and deeper lyrical content. The singer's fifth effort sounds slick indeed, serving up shimmering pop that connects the dots between contemporaries like the 1975, Years & Years, and DNCE. Save for the guitar-based 'Grow Up,' 24 Hrs' its primary objective is to inspire movement. The result is a highly enjoyable LP, upbeat and fun, despite the fact that much of the lyrical content revolves around a rough breakup. [...] Ultimately, 24 Hrs is comforting and reassuring in its ability to lift the spirits, healing broken hearts through dance therapy."

Professional ratings
Review scores
Source	Rating
AllMusic	3.5/5 stars
Digital Spy	3/5 stars
Sunday Times	2/5 stars

== Commercial performance ==
The album debuted at number one on the UK Albums Chart on 18 November 2016 with sales of 58,000 copies, giving Murs his fourth consecutive UK number one album.

== Track listing ==
24 Hrs – Standard version
No.	Title	Writer(s)	Producer(s)	Length
1.	"You Don't Know Love"	Olly Murs; Steve Robson; Camille Purcell; Wayne Hector	Robson	3:18
2.	"Years & Years"	Murs; Hector; Steve Mac	Mac	4:02
3.	"Grow Up"	Murs; Robson; Purcell; Hector	Robson	3:45
4.	"Unpredictable"	Mich Hansen; Daniel Davidsen; Peter Wallevik; Kara DioGuardi; Iain James	Cutfather; Davidsen; Wallevik	3:20
5.	"Back Around"	Murs; Robson; Hector; Claude Kelly	Robson	2:54
6.	"Deeper"	Murs; Mac; Clarence Coffee, Jr.; Chelcee Grimes	Mac	2:36
7.	"24 Hrs"	Murs; Robson; Coffee, Jr.; Janee Bennett	Robson	3:28
8.	"Private"	Murs; Tom Barnes; Ben Kohn; Peter Kelleher; Uzoechi Emenike	TMS; MNEK	3:10
9.	"Love You More"	Ed Drewett; Edvard Erfjord; Andrew Jackson; Henrik Michelsen; Matt Rad	Electric; Rad	3:04
10.	"Read My Mind"	Murs; Robson; Drewett; James Newman	Robson	3:37
11.	"Better Than Me"	Murs; Hector; Carl Falk	Falk	3:54
12.	"Flaws"	Murs; Robson; Coffee, Jr.; Ina Wroldsen	Robson	3:11
Total length:				40:19

24 Hrs – Deluxe version
No.	Title	Writer(s)	Producer(s)	Length
13.	"That Girl"	Murs; Robson; Coffee, Jr.; Wroldsen	Robson	2:56
14.	"Before You Go"	Murs; Jason Dean; Joseph Kirkland; Stefan Forrest; Morten Ristorp	William Ristorp	3:50
15.	"Better Without You"	Murs; Robson; Coffee, Jr.; Wroldsen	Robson	3:39
16.	"How Much for Your Love"	Murs; Robson; Coffee, Jr.; Bennett	Robson	3:33
Total length:				54:17

== Charts and certifications ==
=== Weekly charts ===
Chart (2016)	Peak position
Australian Albums (ARIA)	42
Austrian Albums (Ö3 Austria)	72
Belgian Albums (Ultratop Flanders)	116
Belgian Albums (Ultratop Wallonia)	142
German Albums (Offizielle Top 100)	41
Irish Albums (IRMA)	2
Japanese Albums (Oricon)	106
New Zealand Heatseekers Albums (RMNZ)	7
Scottish Albums (OCC)	2
Swiss Albums (Schweizer Hitparade)	32
UK Albums (OCC)	1

=== Year-end charts ===
Chart (2016)	Position
UK Albums (OCC)	12
Chart (2017)	Position
UK Albums (OCC)	99

=== Certifications ===
Region	Certification	Certified units/sales
United Kingdom (BPI)	Platinum	304,000

== 24 Hrs (Acoustic) ==
24 Hrs (Acoustic)

EP by Olly Murs
- Released: 24 December 2016
- Label: Epic; Syco

Olly Murs chronology
24 Hours (2016)	24 Hrs (Acoustic) (2016)	You Know I Know (2018)

24 Hrs (Acoustic) is an EP containing five acoustic versions of songs from the album, released on 24 December 2016.

=== Track listing ===
24 Hrs (Acoustic)
No.	Title	Length
1.	"You Don't Know Love" (Acoustic)	3:14
2.	"Grow Up" (Acoustic)	3:30
3.	"Years & Years" (Acoustic)	4:03
4.	"Love You More" (Acoustic)	2:55
5.	"Flaws" (Acoustic)	3:08
