= Unpredictable (Olly Murs and Louisa Johnson song) =

Single by Olly Murs and Louisa Johnson

from the album 24 Hrs
- Released: 2 June 2017
- Recorded: 2017
- Genre: Pop
- Length: 3:19
- Label: RCA
- Songwriters: Mich Hansen; Daniel Davidsen; Peter Wallevik; Kara DioGuardi; Iain James
- Producers: Cutfather; Daniel Davidsen; Peter Wallevik; Matt Rad (add.)

Olly Murs singles chronology
"Years & Years" (2016)	"Unpredictable" (2017)	"More Mess" (2017)

Louisa Johnson singles chronology
"Weak (Stay Strong Mix)" (2017)	"Unpredictable" (2017)	"Yes" (2018)

"Unpredictable" is a song recorded by English singer Olly Murs for his fifth studio album, 24 Hrs (2016). It was written and produced by Cutfather, Daniel Davidsen and Peter Wallevik, with an additional writing from Kara DioGuardi and Iain James. Originally recorded as a solo version, it was edited by Matt Rad with additional vocals from English singer Louisa Johnson and was digitally released on 2 June 2017 in the United Kingdom. "Unpredictable" peaked at number 32 on the UK Singles Chart and was certified Silver by the British Phonographic Industry (BPI), denoting sales of over 200,000 units in that country. The accompanying music video for the single takes place in 1978 and features both artists playing tennis against each other.

== Background ==
On 22 May 2017, Murs confirmed on his Twitter account that "Unpredictable" would be the fourth single from 24 Hrs.

== Music video ==
The video for "Unpredictable" was released on 22 June 2017. It was filmed in Palm Springs and is set in 1978 and sees Murs and Johnson playing tennis against each other. As of September 15, 2018, it has over 6 million views on YouTube.

== Credits and personnel ==
- Olly Murs – vocals
- Louisa Johnson – vocals
- Daniel Davidsen – writing, production, bass guitar, programming
- Cutfather – writing, production, percussion
- Peter Wallevik – writing, production, keyboards, piano, programming
- Kara DioGuardi – writing
- Iain James – writing
- Matt Rad – production, bass guitar, guitar, mixing, piano, programming
- Chris Gehringer – mastering

Credits adapted from the liner notes of the official "Unpredictable" CD single release (Columbia Records).

== Charts ==
Chart (2017)	Peak position
Hungary (Rádiós Top 40)	35
Ireland (IRMA)	65
Russian Airplay (Tophit)	212
Scotland Singles (OCC)	20
UK Singles (OCC)	32

== Certifications ==
Region	Certification	Certified units/sales
United Kingdom (BPI)	Gold	400,000^{‡}
^{‡} Sales+streaming figures based on certification alone.

== Release history ==
Region	Date	Format	Version	Label	Ref.
United Kingdom	2 June 2017	Digital download	Original	RCA	
United States	30 June 2017	Digital download	Acoustic	RCA	
