= You Don't Know Love (Olly Murs song) =

Single by Olly Murs

from the album 24 Hrs
- Released: 8 July 2016
- Recorded: 2015
- Genre: Synthpop
- Length: 3:18
- Label: SME; Epic
- Songwriters: Olly Murs; Steve Robson; Camille Purcell; Wayne Hector
- Producer: Steve Robson

Olly Murs singles chronology
"Stevie Knows" (2015)	"You Don't Know Love" (2016)	"Grow Up" (2016)

"You Don't Know Love" is a song performed by English singer-songwriter Olly Murs. It was released as a digital download on 8 July 2016 through Sony Music as the lead single from his fifth studio album 24 Hrs (2016). The song peaked at number 15 on the UK Singles Chart and his since been certified Platinum for selling in excess of 600,000 copies or equivalent streams.

== Critical reception ==
Jessica Mule of Renowned for Sound gave a mixed to positive response in her 3/5 review writing "You Don’t Know Love is a pop synth breakup anthem. The main query I hold with You Don’t Know Love is the pace of the song. It takes 1 minute and 4 seconds for the first chorus to come in, not unheard of, but generally you will find with pop songs, especially radio hits, that the chorus will usually come in around the 40-second mark. This extra 24 seconds really lingers. The chorus is definitely climatic and punchy enough, and it has what a radio played single needs. It just takes a while to get there. I can just imagine certain first-time listeners becoming impatient and changing the station before it even hits the right hook of a chorus. The chorus is well worth the wait though. With its jaded lyric, buzzing synths and layered harmonised vocals it delivers its statement with enough certainty to have you humming, “You don’t know love, you don’t know love!”. While this one phrase is lyrically placed in the context of not knowing love till it hurts you, it is delivered in a way that also makes it a direct message to the person who inflicted that pain. And who hasn’t wanted to inform an ex of their lack of understanding of love, with the stinging line, "You Don’t Know Love"?"

== Music video ==
A music video to accompany the release of "You Don't Know Love" was first released onto YouTube on 14 July 2016 at a total length of three minutes and forty-eight seconds.

Filmed in Las Vegas, the video portrays a woman in the sea before it shows Murs in a hotel room putting on a shirt and suit jacket. He then goes outside to his car where he finds a parking ticket. Seeing that he hasn't enough money to pay for the ticket, Murs goes to a pawnshop and trades in his watch for extra money.

After paying for the ticket, Murs drives through Las Vegas before stopping near the sea and dives into it backwards. Murs then swims over to the woman from the start of the video and they embrace.

The video's water scenes were filmed at Wet'n'Wild Las Vegas.

== Live performances ==
Murs performed "You Don't Know Love"'s first television performance on the launch show of Strictly Come Dancing on 3 September 2016.

== Track listing ==
Digital download
No.	Title	Length
1.	"You Don't Know Love"	3:18

Cheat Codes Remixes
No.	Title	Length
1.	"You Don't Know Love" (Cheat Codes Extended Club Mix Explicit)	4:38
2.	"You Don't Know Love" (Cheat Codes Club Mix Explicit)	3:47
3.	"You Don't Know Love" (Cheat Codes Club Mix Clean)	3:47

== Chart performance ==
"You Don't Know Love" was a sleeper hit for Murs. It debuted at number 23 on the UK Singles Chart on 15 July 2016. In its second week it dropped to number 34 yet rebounded to number thirty in its third week. It dropped to number 32 in its fourth week, and dropped even further to number 35 in its fifth week of release. However, after the song was discounted to 59p on iTunes in its sixth week, the song made a sharp increase to number nineteen, giving Murs his fourteenth UK top-twenty single. In its seventh week, the song dropped to number 31 before making a slight recovery to number 27 in its eighth week. In its ninth week, the song scaled up the chart to number fifteen, which became the singles peak position. It later dropped to number eighteen for two weeks and spent a further three weeks in the top-forty, before falling out of the top-forty in its fifteenth week on the chart. As of 2026, it remains his most recent single to reach the UK top 20.

== Charts and certifications ==
=== Weekly charts ===
Chart (2016)	Peak position
Australia (ARIA)	77
Austria (Ö3 Austria Top 40)	57
Belgium (Ultratip Bubbling Under Flanders)	20
Czech Republic Airplay (ČNS IFPI)	44
Germany (GfK)	76
Hungary (Rádiós Top 40)	9
Ireland (IRMA)	54
Scotland Singles (OCC)	5
Slovakia Airplay (ČNS IFPI)	14
Slovakia Singles Digital (ČNS IFPI)	78
Slovenia (SloTop50)	19
Sweden (Sverigetopplistan)	40
Switzerland (Schweizer Hitparade)	90
UK Singles (OCC)	15

=== Year-end charts ===
Chart (2016)	Position
UK Singles (Official Charts Company)	84

=== Certifications ===
Region	Certification	Certified units/sales
Sweden (GLF)	Gold	20,000^{‡}
United Kingdom (BPI)	Platinum	600,000^{‡}
^{‡} Sales+streaming figures based on certification alone.

== Release history ==
Region	Date	Format	Label
United Kingdom	8 July 2016	Digital download	SME, Epic
