= Bangkok Jazz Festival =

Music festival in Bangkok, Thailand

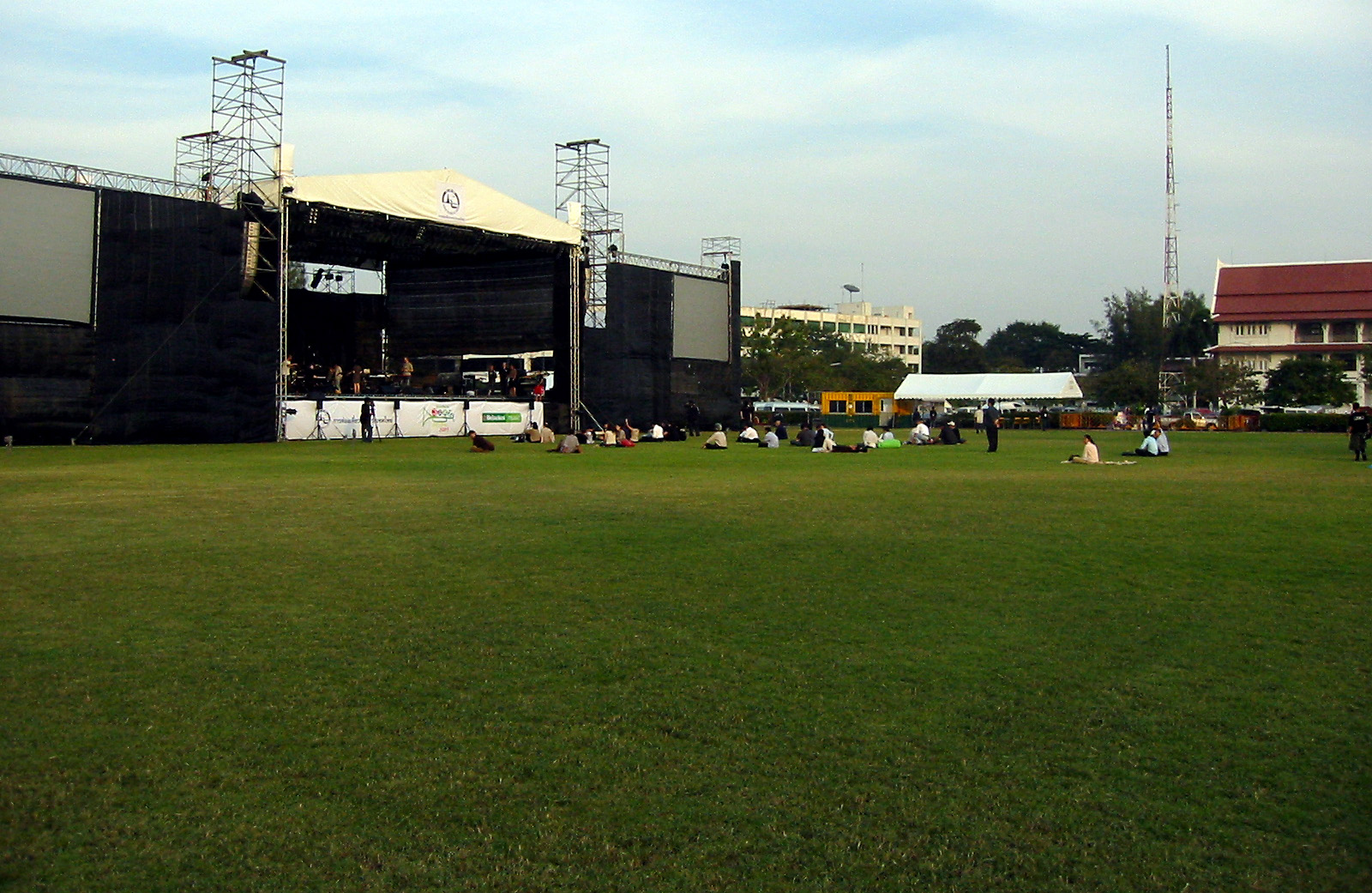
The Sanam Suea Pa in 2005.

Bangkok Jazz Festival is a jazz festival in Bangkok, Thailand. The festival was established in 2003 in commemoration of the King Bhumibol Adulyadej of Thailand who is said to have a passion for jazz. It takes place at Sanam Suea Pa in Dusit District. It is usually held for three nights in December, where a number of internationally known artists perform at the festival. The festival attracts around 30,000 people each year.
