= Olly Murs =

British singer (born 1984)

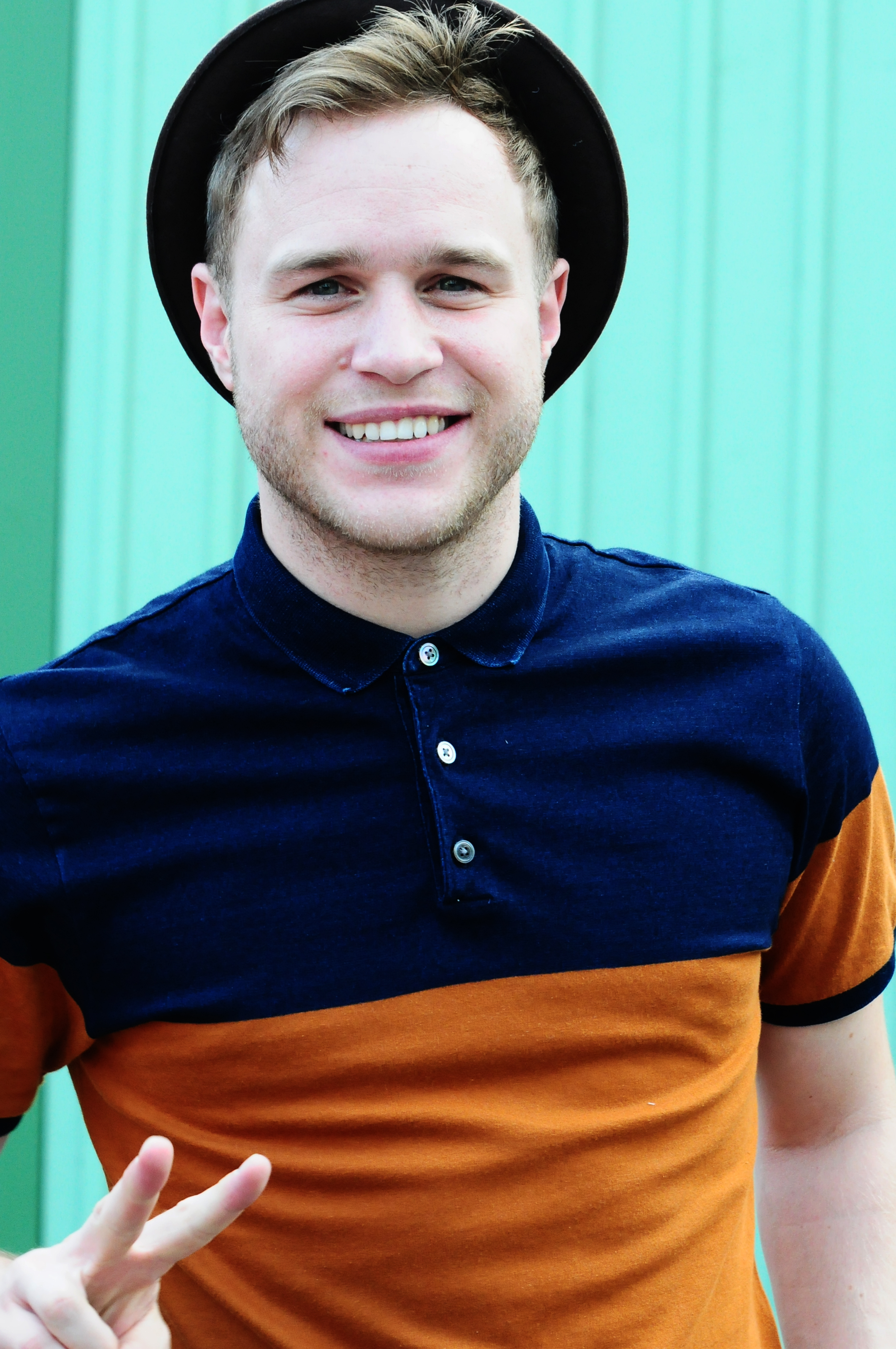
- Murs in 2012
- Born: Oliver Stanley Murs; 14 May 1984 (age 42); Witham, Essex, England
- Occupations: Singer; songwriter; television personality
- Years active: 2009–present
- Television: The X Factor (2009, 2015); The Xtra Factor (2011–2012); The Voice (2018–2023); Starstruck (2022–2023)
- Children: 2
- Musical career
- Genre: Pop
- Labels: Epic; Syco; Columbia; RCA; Sony Music; EMI; BMG
- Website: ollymurs.com
Association football career
- Position: Striker
Youth career
- Valley Green
Senior career*
Years	Team	Apps	(Gls)
2006–2008	Witham Town	2	(1)
2016–2017	Coggeshall Town		
- * Club domestic league appearances and goals

Oliver Stanley Murs (born 14 May 1984) is an English singer, songwriter, and television personality. He became known while participating on the television talent show The X Factor, during The X Factor's sixth series in 2009, where he finished as runner-up.

Following the show, Murs was signed to RCA Records and Sony Music, and Columbia Records in the United States. In 2010, he released his self-titled debut album, which entered the Albums Chart at number two and was certified double platinum by the British Phonographic Industry (BPI). It included the hit singles "Please Don't Let Me Go" and "Thinking of Me". His second album, In Case You Didn't Know (2011), debuted at number one and resulted in two number-one singles: "Heart Skips a Beat" and "Dance with Me Tonight". Murs released his third album, Right Place Right Time (2012), it included"Troublemaker", which was his fourth number one in Britain.

In 2014, Murs released the single "Wrapped Up" which reached the top-five on the Singles Chart. It was included on his fourth album, Never Been Better (2014), which entered the British Albums Chart at number one. He has since released the albums 24 Hrs (2016), You Know I Know (2018), Marry Me (2022), and Knees Up (2025). All of which reached the top five on the British albums chart. In 2019, his 2016 single "That Girl", from the deluxe edition of 24 Hrs, became a major success in China, achieving widespread popularity and becoming one of his biggest international hits.

In 2011, Murs returned to The X Factor to co-present its spin-off show The Xtra Factor, alongside Caroline Flack. In 2015, he reunited with Flack to replace Dermot O'Leary as co-presenters of The X Factor for series 12. From 2018 to 2023, he was a coach on the television talent show The Voice.

== Early life and football career ==
Murs was born on 14 May 1984 in Witham, Essex, the son of Vicky-Lynn and Pete Murs. He has a twin brother, Ben, and a sister, Fay. He has partial Latvian ancestry through his paternal great-grandparents, Eduards Alberts Mūrs and Veronika Jankovska, who were circus performers. He attended Howbridge Junior School in Witham and Notley High School in Braintree, Essex, where he was a striker in the school's football team.

Murs played semi-professionally for Isthmian Division One North side Witham Town between 2006 and 2008. He excelled for the club's reserve team during the 2006–07 season, scoring 12 goals in 13 appearances and winning the Ridgeons Reserve Teams Cup. He made three first team appearances in the following season, scoring once, but was forced to give up his football career following an injury. In April 2016, Murs began to play for local side Coggeshall Town.

He also appeared on the game show Deal or No Deal in 2007, where he won £10. Footage of Murs appearing on the show was later featured in an edition of the BBC's Almost Famous on 2 January 2010. Murs returned for a celebrity version of Deal or No Deal in 2012, which made him the only person to appear on the programme as a contestant twice.

Prior to The X Factor, Murs worked at Kitchens Direct as a telemarketer and then as a recruitment consultant at Prime Appointments in Witham, and performed as part of a covers band called the Small Town Blaggers with a friend, Jon Goodey. In 2008, he travelled to Australia, backpacking alone along the Gold Coast for three months. It was upon his return that he decided, having tried it out unsuccessfully twice in the past (when he failed to make it past the stage where he had to audition in front of the producers), to re-audition for The X Factor.

== Music career ==
=== 2009–2011: The X Factor and debut album ===
In 2009, Murs auditioned for the sixth series of The X Factor, performing Stevie Wonder's "Superstition". Judge Simon Cowell said it was "the easiest yes I've ever given". At bootcamp Murs sang Elton John's song "Your Song". On the first live show, he sang "She's the One" and on the second, "A Fool in Love", a performance which Cowell described as being "in a different league." For week three he took on "Bewitched, Bothered and Bewildered". Louis Walsh commented that he was the "dark horse of the competition," and Cowell said he was "coming into his own each week." He frequently employed dance moves in his performance including his trademark "Olly wiggle." In week 4 he sang "Come Together" and again received positive comments, with Walsh predicting, "I think you're in the final three," and Cowell saying he was "progressing better than just about everybody." In week 5 he performed "Twist and Shout" and in week 6 "Don't Stop Me Now", after which he was labelled by Minogue as, "absolutely the best performer we have on the show by far."

In week 7, after a performance of "Fastlove", he was in the bottom two with John & Edward. Cowell and Cheryl Cole and Dannii Minogue voted to send Murs through to the quarter-final while Walsh voted to send John & Edward through to the quarter-final. Voting statistics revealed that John & Edward received more votes than Murs, meaning that if Minogue (who had the casting vote) sent the result to deadlock, John & Edward would have advanced to the quarter-final. To participate in the semi-finals, Murs had to miss his brother's wedding. The ceremony took place just 16 miles (26 km) from the show's studio, but Cowell was against allowing him off for a few hours on the day of the semi-final. He sang "Can You Feel It" and "We Can Work It Out" in the semi-final and ended up as one of the three finalists, breaking down on hearing the result.

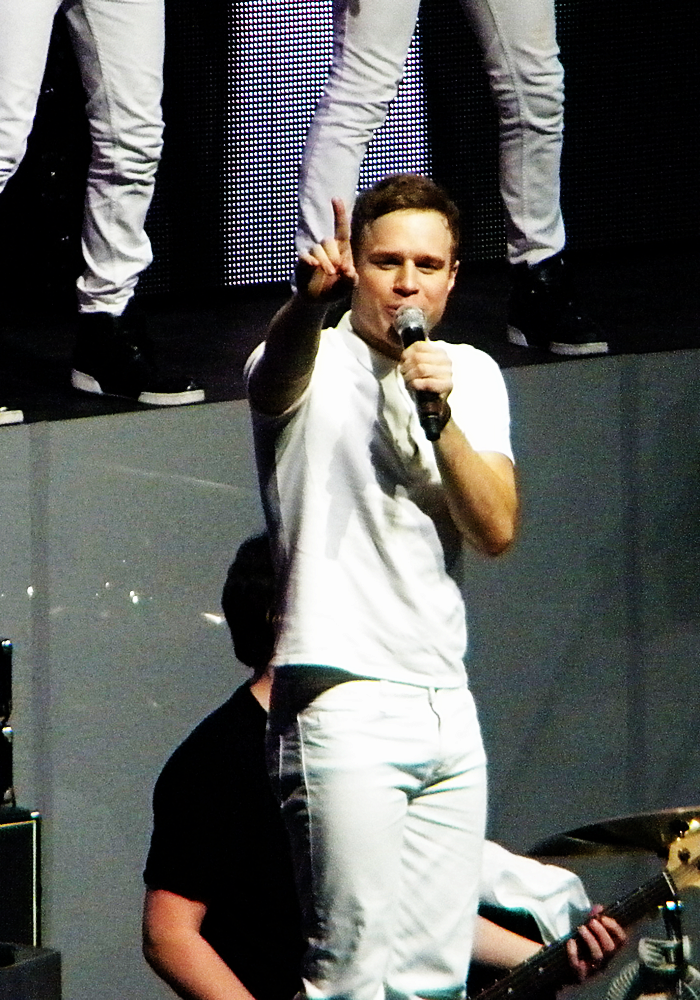
Olly Murs performing on The X Factor tour in 2010

In the final on 12 December, he repeated his audition song, "Superstition", following which Cowell said putting him in the final 12 was "the best risk I have ever taken in my life". Murs then sang with Robbie Williams on a duet of "Angels", in which Williams fluffed his lines as he walked on stage to join Murs and came in at the wrong time, singing the second line of the song, but was helped by Murs to find the right spot. There was then a repeat performance of his week 2 song "Fool in Love". Murs qualified for the final two and first sang a repeat performance of "Twist and Shout", following which Walsh commented, "You're a born, born showman and no matter what happens tonight you're going to have a great career in music."

In his final performance on the show he performed the winner's song, "The Climb". He was told by Cole, "You absolutely tore it from your soul. I've never heard you sing like that. I thought it was a beautiful version of the song." He lost the final to Joe McElderry the next day and finished as the runner-up. On 15 December, two days after the final, it was reported that Cowell was going to offer Murs a record deal in early 2010. Following his defeat, Murs was reportedly texted by duet partner Robbie Williams and invited to visit him in his Los Angeles mansion and participate in the forthcoming Soccer Aid, organised by Williams.

Murs performed on The X Factor tour, alongside McElderry, John & Edward, Stacey Solomon, Lucie Jones and several other finalists. It was later revealed on The Xtra Factor that Murs was predicted by all the judges and presenters (except Minogue who had said Nicole Jackson, and Cole who had said Miss Frank as a second choice) as the favourite to win the series at the Bootcamp stage.

Rumours began that Murs would record a debut album almost immediately after the final. After the rumours broke out, Murs announced he signed a joint record deal between Epic Records and Syco Music in February 2010. It was announced that Murs began working with John Shanks and Eg White. It was later confirmed that Roy Stride, Trevor Horn, Wayne Hector and Matty Benbrook would have involvement on the album which he collaborated with to make the "best possible songs". More writers and producers were confirmed to be working with Murs in the studio, including: Phil Thornalley, Martin Brammer, Samuel Preston, Mark Taylor, Chris Difford and Professor Green were due to appear on the album; however, the duet fell through before recording was completed.

Murs confirmed the first single from the album to be titled "Please Don't Let Me Go", which was released on 27 August 2010 following the circulation of the accompanying music video. The song was written by Murs himself and with other songwriters, Claude Kelly and Steve Robson; the single was also produced by Future Cut. The song is about a minor relationship Murs was in where he ended up feeling something for the other person. Murs commented: "Sadly she kept giving me the impression that she didn't like me as much, and ultimately it didn't work out, so that's where the idea of me singing 'Please Don't Let Me Go' came from." The song was described as "a lovely summery reggae-tinged pop tune that bobs along in a thoroughly hummable and not un-Will Young-like fashion" and said that the music video "is just as quintessentially pleasant". During the release, Murs was told not to get his hopes up for a number-one due to Katy Perry releasing "Teenage Dream" the same day. On 5 September 2010, the single entered the UK Singles Charts at number 1 beating Katy Perry's "Teenage Dream". The song was released with the B-side track, entitled "This One's for the Girls" also entered the UK Singles Charts, debuting at number 69, was written for all of his female fans.

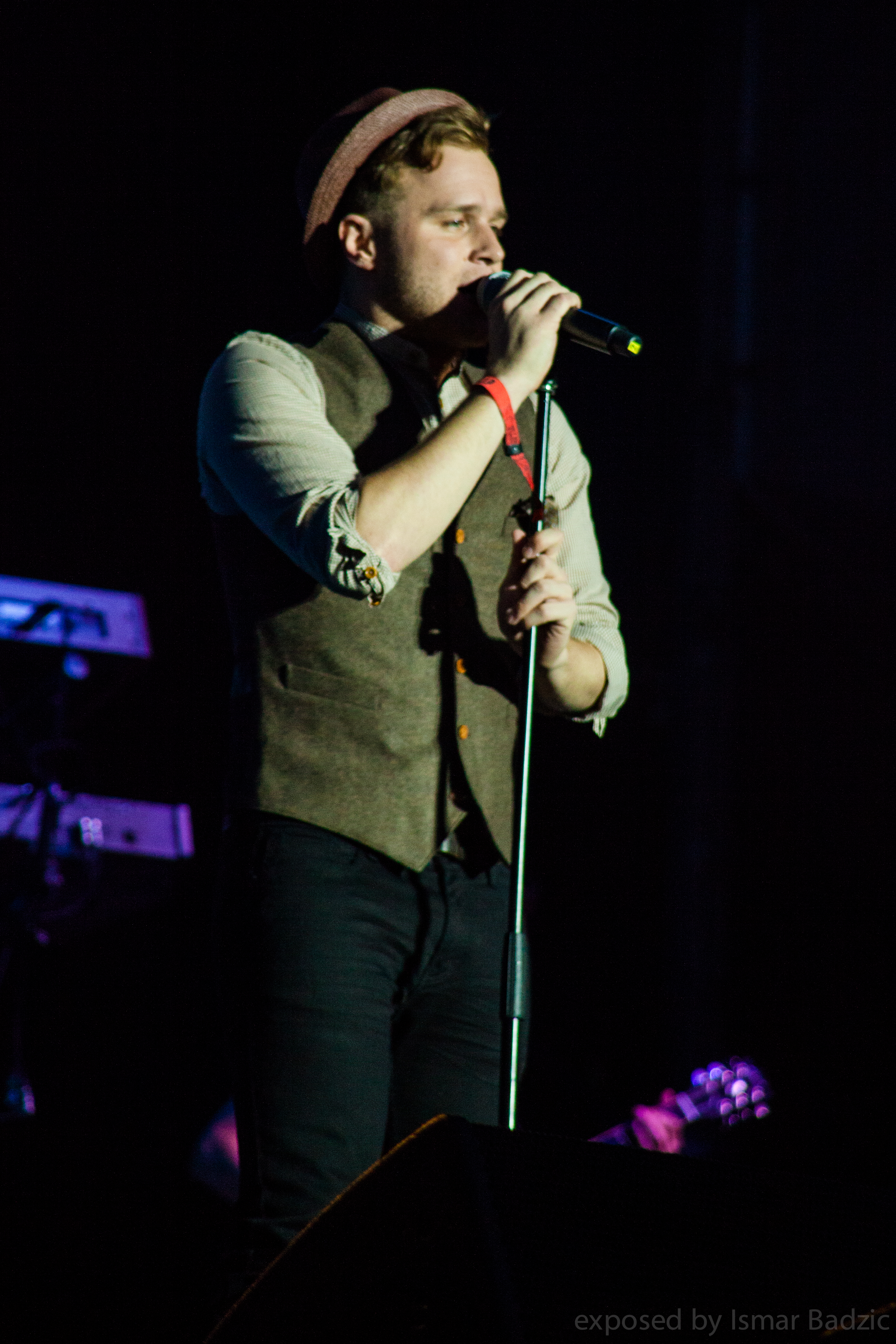
Murs performing material from Olly Murs in 2012

His debut album was released in November 2010; which was a self-titled album, Olly Murs. The album's tracking list was revealed on 15 October 2010. The album entered the UK Albums Chart at number two, with the biggest week-one album sales for a debut album in 2010, with over 108,000 albums sold. The album also charted on the Irish Albums Chart where it found itself peaking at number eleven. The second single was "Thinking of Me", written by Murs, Steve Robson and Hector, and co-produced by Future Cut and Steve Robson. It was released on 19 November 2010, prior to the album's release. The single was added to BBC Radio 1's C Playlist on 3 November 2010. Murs performed the single for the first time on The X Factor. Upon the release the single charted at number four on the UK Singles Charts and thirteen on the Irish Singles Charts.

On 13 November Murs turned the Christmas lights on in Paisley and he also turned on the Christmas lights near his hometown in Chelmsford, Essex. Renfrewshire Council was criticised in the media for the £15,000 fee that Murs was paid to turn on the lights, after announcing that they were axing 500 jobs. Murs however donated his fee for his appearance at this event.

Two further singles were released from the first album into 2011 – the James Morrison penned "Heart on My Sleeve", which charted at No. 20 in March 2011, and "Busy" which charted at No. 45 in June 2011.

Murs completed a theatre tour for his first album in spring 2011, commencing on 26 April in Rhyl at the Pavilion Theatre and playing four sold out nights at London's Hammersmith Apollo in late May. He also toured as the support act of JLS on their summer stadium tour.

=== 2011: In Case You Didn't Know ===
It was rumoured in June 2011, that Murs had started working on his second studio album, which he later confirmed. Murs claimed that he would "take the album from a different approach", and claimed he would like to record a rap track, stating, "I'm secretly not a bad rapper, I really like to do a bit of beat boxing, Eminem is always a favourite, or maybe Vanilla Ice, "Ice Ice Baby" is a classic." Murs revealed that he will attempt to build himself a more of a "soulful" sound through writing the second album, and also expressed interest in recording with English entertainer Robbie Williams after the two met on The X Factor Live Final.

Murs confirmed in July 2011, that the lead single from the album would be called "Heart Skips a Beat", and it would feature up-and-coming Brithop Rap duo Rizzle Kicks. He described it as a "parallel" to the remainder of the album, calling it a "summer party song". The song premiered on The Chris Moyles Show on 7 July 2011 and has since been well received by fans. The video for the track was later released via Murs's official YouTube channel. Murs said that the song is one of his favourite tracks from the new album, stating, "I'm loving the tune at the moment. It's going down really, really well." "Heart Skips a Beat" later peaked at number one on the UK Singles Chart, marking his second number one. It later went on to peak at number one in Germany and Switzerland, also reaching top ten in numerous countries in Europe.

In September 2011, Murs announced via Twitter that his second album would be entitled In Case You Didn't Know, taken from a song of the same name which appears on the album. On 14 October 2011, Murs released the audio of "Dance with Me Tonight", the album's second single, via his YouTube Channel. The track was released on 21 November 2011, again peaking at No. 1 on the UK Singles Chart. The album, In Case You Didn't Know was released a week later on 28 November 2011. The album peaked at number one on the UK Albums Chart, two on the Irish Charts, and in the top ten in Germany, Switzerland and Poland. Murs confirmed via his Twitter account in February 2012 that the album's third single would be "Oh My Goodness", and that it would be released on 2 April. It peaked at No. 13 on the UK Singles Chart. The single was his second release in Europe after "Heart Skips a Beat", released on 10 August, and has so far peaked in the top 40 in Germany and Austria.

On 5 and 6 December 2011, Murs supported Gary Barlow at Barlow's Concerts at the Royal Albert Hall, where they performed together on the Take That hit "Shine".

On 19 April 2012, a three-part documentary trailing Murs throughout his UK Arena Tour, entitled Olly: Life on Murs, premiered on ITV2. It drew over half a million viewers.

=== 2012–2013: Right Place Right Time ===
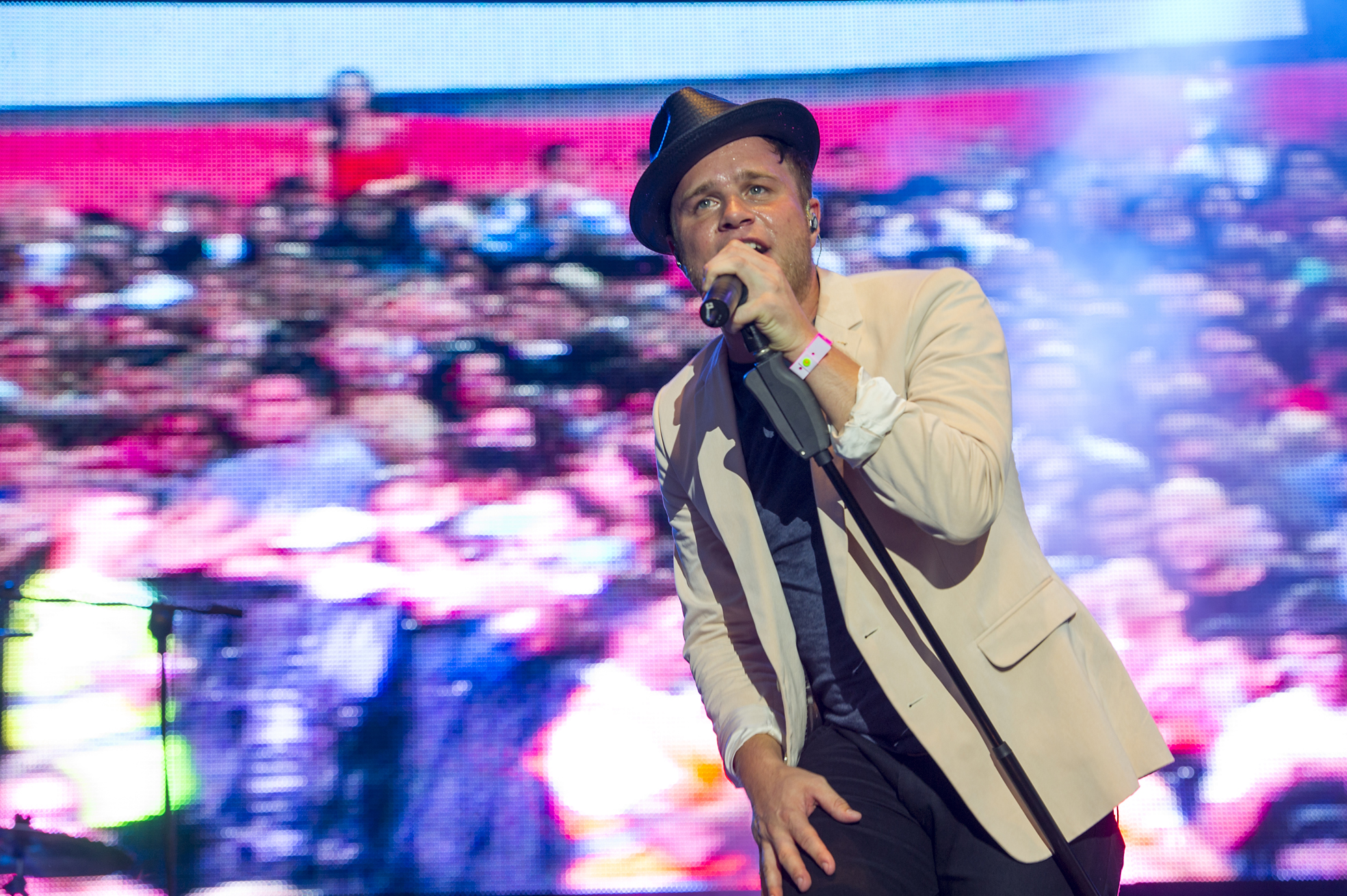
Murs performing at the 2013 Gibraltar Music Festival

In April 2012, it was revealed that Murs was in the process of writing his third studio album, which was released on 26 November 2012. Murs has once again written with Steve Robson and Claude Kelly. Ed Drewett (best known for his work for The Wanted) and Andrew Frampton and Steve Kipner (producers of both albums for The Script) are other names that have been confirmed for the third album, and in a June 2012 interview with the website Examiner he confirmed the name of a new song, "One of These Days", which he described as a 'follow-on' song from "I Need You Now" on his previous album.

In August, Murs performed at V Festival where he did his own set and also joined Madness for a performance of "It Must Be Love" and "One Step Beyond".

On 17 September, Murs announced the first single from his third album, "Troublemaker", a collaboration with Claude Kelly and Steve Robson which features American rapper Flo Rida and was released on 18 November. It also served as Murs's second U.S. single. The same day, he also announced the name of the third album, Right Place Right Time. The cover artwork and track listing for the album was unveiled on 1 October. Murs will be embarking on a second arena tour of the UK and Ireland in February/March 2013 to support the album, as well as performing his first live European dates in Germany, Switzerland, Sweden and Denmark in April 2013. On 14 January 2013, Murs confirmed that the second single from the album would be "Army of Two", which was released on 10 March 2013. The album's third single, "Dear Darlin'", was released on 3 June 2013. On 25 August 2013, the album's title track "Right Place Right Time" was released as the fourth single.

Murs was the opening act for English boy band One Direction on the North American leg of their Up All Night Tour, which began on 29 May in Toronto.

"Heart Skips a Beat" was released as Murs's first U.S. single through Columbia Records on 29 May 2012, replacing Rizzle Kicks with American rappers Chiddy Bang for its release. As of September 2012, it has peaked at No. 96 on the Billboard Hot 100. Murs was set to release 'In Case You Didn't Know' as his debut U.S. album on 25 September 2012, also through Columbia, however it was reported on 2 September that the release had been 'postponed until further notice'. On 17 September, Columbia then confirmed a new release date of 3 December and that they would now be releasing Murs's third UK album, Right Place Right Time as his debut U.S. release instead. The track listing for this will include "Heart Skips a Beat", "Dance with Me Tonight" and "Oh My Goodness" alongside "Troublemaker" and six other tracks from the new UK album. The release was further delayed.

Murs provided support for English entertainer Robbie Williams on his Take the Crown Stadium Tour and also performed a duet with him on Kids. In July 2013, Murs served as the headline act at Alton Towers Live.

In September, was announced that a new French version of "Dear Darlin", with participation of the famous singer Alizée, would be released in the second day of the month, with also the support of a concert in Paris to attack the France market. On 11 September, Murs announced on his Facebook page that he was going to release a re-packaged edition of Right Place Right Time, which would be released in November 2013. Also on the same day Murs announced that he will feature on English entertainer Robbie Williams's upcoming album Swings Both Ways, singing "I Wan'na Be Like You", a song which he had sung on his first attempt to audition for The X Factor. Murs also featured on the UK version of rapper Classified's song "Inner Ninja", released on 10 November 2013. Murs unveiled "Hand on Heart" as the lead single from the re-release of Right Place Right Time and was released on 24 November with the re-release following a week later.

=== 2014–2017: Never Been Better and 24 Hrs ===
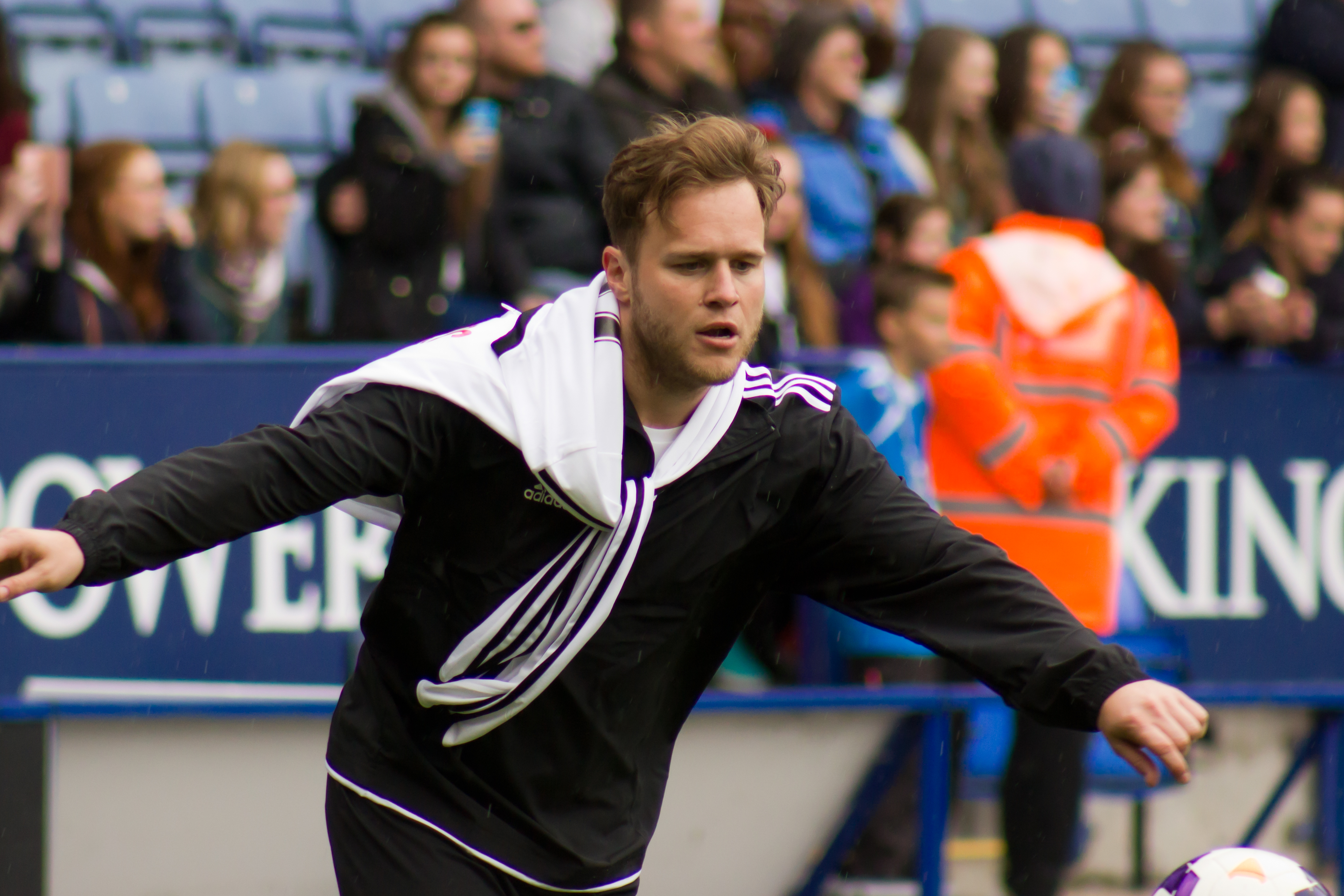
Olly Murs in 2014

In July 2013, Murs revealed that he had been back in the studio writing and recording new material for his fourth album. In February 2014, it was revealed that work had begun on his fourth studio album. He worked with Demi Lovato, Wayne Hector, Claude Kelly and Steve Robson. On 28 September, Murs announced that the title of the album would be called Never Been Better and also announced the track list alongside it. The album was released on 24 November and debuted at number one on the UK Albums Chart. The album's first single "Wrapped Up" was released on 16 November 2014 and debuted at number three on the UK Singles Chart. The album's second single "Up" featuring American actress Demi Lovato reached number four in the UK singles chart.

On 10 February 2015, Murs confirmed on his Twitter account that the third single to be released from the album would be "Seasons". On 12 December 2014, Murs released a Christmas EP titled Unwrapped exclusivelyon Google Play. In February 2015, it was announced that a waxwork figure of Murs would be put into Madame Tussauds Waxworks in Blackpool, which was unveiled on 30 March 2015. During a concert at The O2 Arena on 4 May 2015 and later on his Twitter account, Murs confirmed that the fourth single to be released from the album would be "Beautiful to Me". On 2 October 2015, Murs announced on his Twitter account that he would release a special edition of Never Been Better (which like the special edition of Right Place Right Time woud feature extra tracks and a tour DVD) on 20 November 2015 and the first single released was Kiss Me which reached number 11 in the UK singles chart.

In early 2016, Murs began work on his fifth studio album which would be released later in the year. On 1 July 2016, Murs revealed on his Twitter account that the album's first single "You Don't Know Love" would be released on 8 July. On 9 July 2016, Murs served as a support act for British five piece vocal group Take That at their British Summer Time concert at Hyde Park in London. On 2 September 2016, Murs announced on his Twitter account that his fifth album would be called 24 Hrs and would be released on 11 November. On the same day, Murs announced that he would be going on tour in March and April 2017. On 22 June 2017, Murs released his collaboration with Louisa Johnson called "Unpredictable", the video already has more than five million views on YouTube.

=== 2018–2024: You Know I Know, "That Girl" success and Marry Me ===
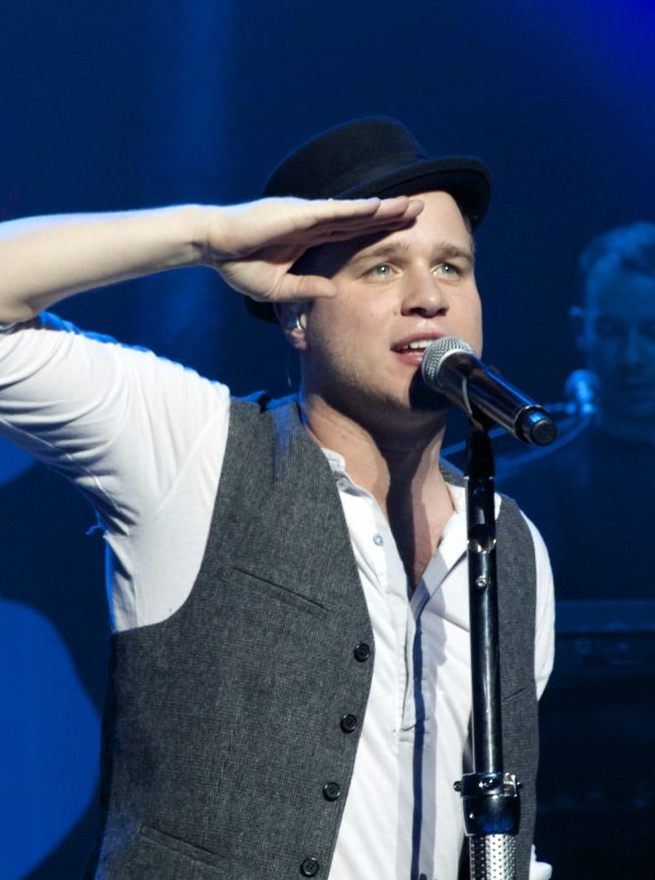
Olly Murs in New Zealand

On 9 January 2018, Murs revealed on his Instagram story to be working on his sixth album. In October 2018, Murs announced that his sixth album would be a double album called You Know I Know with one disc featuring new tracks and the second disc continuing singles from Murs's previous albums. The first single from the album was "Moves" and featured guest vocals from Snoop Dogg and an appearance from Rowan Atkinson as the waiter in the bar as himself. The album is compiled of both new and old songs, detailing the title of what his fandom know and what he knows. The creation of this album brought new music to his audience and reprised versions of popular songs from his previous albums.

By April 2019, "That Girl", a bonus track from the deluxe edition of Murs' fifth studio album 24 HRS (2016), had accumulated more than four billion streams and downloads in China. Despite not being released as an official single, the song achieved unexpected commercial success after going viral on Chinese social media and music streaming platforms, inspiring numerous cover versions and user-generated content. Its popularity led to multiple sales certifications in China and the release of an official remix featuring Chinese producer and singer CORSAK. The song became one of Murs' most commercially successful recordings in the country.

In February 2022, Murs split with label RCA Records. On 7 October 2022, Murs released the single "Die of a Broken Heart", which debuted at number 19 on the UK Official Downloads Singles Chart Top 100 a week later. Murs also announced the Marry Me Tour for 2023. Singles "Die of a Broken Heart" and "I Hate You When You're Drunk" were released, before the parent album, Marry Me, was released on 2 December 2022 and charted at number one on release.

On 7 May 2023, Murs performed at King Charles III's Coronation Concert, held at Windsor Castle.

=== 2025–present: Knees Up ===
On his 2025 "15 Years of Hits Tour" Murs performed an unreleased song titled "Save Me", from his upcoming eighth album Knees Up. On 22 May 2025, Murs walked off the stage and ended the show during a concert at the OVO Hydro in Glasgow, Scotland, after performing just six songs. He later apologized to his fans on Instagram, saying he had been seeing a doctor and that he "felt a little bit run down".

In July 2025, "Save Me" as released as the album's lead single; a second single, "Bonkers", followed in September 2025. Alongside the release of "Bonkers", Olly Murs revealed the title of his upcoming eighth studio album, Knees Up, which is set to release on 21 November 2025. On 24 October 2025, Murs released the album's third single "Run This Town"; he performed the single for the first time on the 16 November 2025 "Results Show" episode of Strictly Come Dancing. On 1 December 2025, Murs released the single "Christmas Starts Tonight", in collaboration with The Ordinary Boys; the song is the original demo that eventually turned out to be "Run This Town".

== Television career ==
=== BBC ===
In 2011, Murs appeared on CBBC's children's hidden camera show Remote Control Star.

In June 2014, Murs along with Rio Ferdinand presented World Cup's 50 Greatest Moments on BBC Three on the run up to the World Cup 2014.

=== ITV ===
On 31 May 2011, it was confirmed that Murs would be co-presenting the eighth series of The Xtra Factor alongside Caroline Flack.

Due to his international release and touring with One Direction over the summer, he was not present for the audition, boot camp and judges' houses stages of the ninth series, but did however record some special segments with selected auditionees that were broadcast in these episodes. He returned to the show full-time with Flack on the first live show of the series on 6 October 2012.

In April 2013, it was confirmed that Murs had quit his role as co-presenter of The Xtra Factor to concentrate on his music career. He was replaced by Matt Richardson.

On 6 October 2013, Murs returned to The X Factor as a guest mentor to help judge Gary Barlow pick his contestant for the live shows of the competition.

On 12 December 2014, Murs performed and presented his ITV special A Night In With Olly Murs. The show featured him performing some of his songs as well as photobomb with Nicole Scherzinger, prank Caroline Flack, appear in a special episode of EastEnders and lip sync with John Bishop.

It was confirmed on 16 April 2015 that Murs and Flack would take over from Dermot O'Leary as the presenters of twelfth series of The X Factor. However, on 22 February 2016, Flack and Murs confirmed that they would not be returning to the thirteenth series of The X Factor and were permanently replaced by O'Leary.

On 18 December 2015, Murs and Flack served as presenters for ITV's Christmas telethon Text Santa.

Murs served as both a guest and guest panelist on Loose Women on 26 July 2016 in place of Katie Price who had fallen ill.

ITV confirmed on 11 October 2017 that Murs had become a coach on the seventh series of The Voice UK. He returned for five more series of the show, before his exit in 2024.

On 15 December 2018, Murs hosted an ITV special titled Happy Hour with Olly Murs. He invited several guests, including Bradley Walsh, Tom Jones, Emma Willis, Megan McKenna, Rochelle Humes, Chris Hughes and Kem Cetinay.

In April 2021, it was announced that Murs will present an ITV talent show series titled Starstruck.

== Other work ==
Murs's career in football, and support of Manchester United, means he has frequently appeared on sport based TV shows and radio stations such as Talksport, either during promotion of his music or as a talking head giving his opinion on matches.

Murs released a special DVD, entitled "Olly Murs: 7 Deadly Sins of Football", through 2Entertain on 28 November 2011. In this DVD he introduced archive clips of Premier League matches well noted for displaying "when players get too greedy, when they get angry, [and] when they get lazy", as well as offering opinions from Ray Parlour, Alvin Martin, Jason Cundy, Ray Houghton and Micky Quinn from talkSPORT.

In January 2013, as part of celebrations to mark the 150th anniversary of the founding of The FA, Murs was appointed as an FA150 Ambassador, along with other leading figures from the world of football such as Alan Shearer, Gary Lineker and Bobby Charlton.

Murs has also been involved in modelling/fashion work, including some modelling for the autumn/winter 2012 range of Robbie Williams' clothing label Farrell.

Murs released an illustrated autobiography, Happy Days, published by Coronet (an imprint of Hodder & Stoughton) on 11 October 2012. Photography for the book was shot by Dean Freeman, who has also worked on books for JLS, Michael Bublé and David Beckham, and Murs also recorded an audio version of the book that was made available to download. Murs confirmed on 12 March 2015 that he would be releasing a second book titled On The Road.

=== Philanthropy ===
In February 2011, it was announced that Murs would participate in the BT Charity Trek, with other celebrities, as part of the 2011 Comic Relief Red Nose Day campaign. The celebrities spent five days in the Kaisut desert in north Kenya, covering 100 kilometres (62 miles) in temperatures up to 40 °C.

On 2 April 2011, Murs appeared in a celebrity version of Who Wants to Be a Millionaire? and won £10,000 for charity. On 22 April, he appeared on a celebrity edition of Deal or No Deal, where he won 50p for his chosen charity, Brainwave, a local charity based in Murs's home town of which he had become a patron, for children with brain conditions such as cerebral palsy or developmental delay.

On 24 March 2012, In aid of Sport Relief, Murs performed alongside Rizzle Kicks, Vida and JLS at a special charity concert, held at The O2 Arena in London.

On 27 May 2012, Murs played for England in a charity match for Soccer Aid at Old Trafford, but was taken off in the first half due to a hamstring injury. England ended up winning the match in a 3–1 victory against the rest of the world. This was the second time Murs had played for the England Team at Soccer Aid. He played back in 2010, a third time in 2014 and made a fourth appearance in 2016.

He is also a patron for the Nordoff-Robbins music therapy charity, and more recently he has become a patron for the Rays of Sunshine Children's Charity, who grant wishes to seriously or terminally ill children aged 3–18 in the United Kingdom.

On 10 November 2014, Murs confirmed on his Twitter account that he would join the line up for Band Aid 30.

In June 2021, Murs organised the "Climb for Caroline", a sponsored climb of mountain peaks in the Lake District. The walk intended to raise money for the mental health support charity Samaritans, and named after Caroline Flack, who had died the previous February.

=== Radio presenting ===
On 4 April 2011, Murs stood in for Comedy Dave Vitty on The Chris Moyles Show on Radio 1 for one week while Vitty was rehearsing for Dancing on Ice.

At the end of May 2011, Murs presented a Celebrity Club Classics show on Heart FM. He went on to present a Celebrity Special over the Christmas Period in 2011 and again in 2012.

On 25 December 2014, Murs reunited with Caroline Flack to co-present a Christmas Day radio show on British radio station Magic. They later did another radio show for Magic on New Year's Eve.

Global Media & Entertainment confirmed that as of 1 March 2024, Murs would be broadcasting a national show with Mark Wright across the Heart Radio network. The show broadcasts weekly from 9am-12pm on Saturdays.

=== Voice acting ===
In 2019, Murs made his acting debut as the voice of Spike the Doberman in a two-part special of the Disney Channel series 101 Dalmatian Street titled "A Summer to Remember".

Murs made his voice acting film debut in Spies in Disguise.

== Personal life ==
Murs lived with his twin brother Ben and parents Vicky and Pete Murs until 2012, when he moved into a five-bedroom house of his own in Toot Hill, Essex. He supports Manchester United.

Olly stated on The Jonathan Ross Show in March 2015 that Ben was estranged from his parents and that the incident stemmed from Murs not being able to attend Ben's wedding because of X Factor commitments.

In 2015, Murs first opened up about ongoing mental health issues, admitting that he turned to alcohol to cope with depression caused by the pressure of a new career during his time on the X Factor tour. In 2016, he experienced anxiety and panic attacks after facing stark criticism about his short-lived career as a presenter for The Xtra Factor. Appearing for a "routine performance" on the Graham Norton Show to promote his new music, Murs was struck with sudden, overwhelming panic, stating his "heart was pounding" and he "couldn't breathe". He continued to experience panic attacks when he was confirmed as a coach for The Voice UK, which led to him seeking therapy to cope with his anxiety. He went on to write the song "Talking to Yourself" about his anxiety and encourages other men to speak up about their mental health.

On 24 November 2017, Murs was caught up in the Oxford Circus panic while shopping in Selfridges, Oxford Street. He was criticised by the police and the media for tweeting false claims about gunshots in Selfridges, and for alleging in April 2018 that the police had covered up a terrorist attack in the shop.

On 4 June 2022, Murs announced his engagement to girlfriend Amelia Tank. They have two children.

In September 2024, Murs was the subject of the BBC television show Who Do You Think You Are? which, with the help of genealogists and historians, explored the lives of his Latvian ancestors.

== Discography ==
- Olly Murs (2010)
- In Case You Didn't Know (2011)
- Right Place Right Time (2012)
- Never Been Better (2014)
- 24 Hrs (2016)
- You Know I Know (2018)
- Marry Me (2022)
- Knees Up (2025)

== Concert tours ==
=== Headlining ===
- The Olly Murs Tour (2011)
- In Case You Didn't Know Tour (2012)
- Right Place Right Time Tour (2013)
- Never Been Better Tour (2015)
- 24 Hrs Tour (2017)
- You Know I Know Tour (2019)
- Best Hits Summer Tour (2021)
- Marry Me Tour (2023)
- 15 Years of Hits - Live 2025 (2025)

=== Supporting ===
- JLS's Outta This World tour (UK leg) (2011)
- One Direction's Up All Night Tour (USA leg) (2012)
- Robbie Williams's Take the Crown Stadium Tour (2013)
- Take That's This Life on Tour (2024)

== Filmography ==
Year	Title	Role	Notes
2007	Deal or No Deal	Contestant	
2009, 2015	The X Factor	Contestant / Co-presenter	Contestant on series 6 Co-presenter with Caroline Flack on series 12
2010, 2011	Never Mind the Buzzcocks	Himself	Guest; 2 episodes
2010–2014	Football Focus	Himself	4 episodes
2010–2021	Soccer Aid	Himself	5 episodes
2011	8 Out of 10 Cats	Himself	Guest; 1 episode
2011	Who Wants to Be a Millionaire?	Celebrity Contestant	1 episode
2011	Olly Murs Ye Olde Christmas Carol	Presenter	Television special
2011	An Olly Good Christmurs	Presenter	Television special
2011–2012	The Xtra Factor	Co-presenter	With Caroline Flack
2011–2018	Celebrity Juice	Himself	Guest; 18 episodes
2013	90210	Himself	Season 5 Episode 19
2013	Dancing with the Stars	Performer	1 episode
2013, 2015	Britain's Got Talent	Performer	2 episodes
2014	A Night In With Olly Murs	Presenter	
2014	An Olly Jolly Christmurs	Presenter	Heart TV's Christmas line-up
2015	Text Santa	Co-presenter	With Caroline Flack
2015	Top Gear	Himself	Special guest; 1 episode
2015	Ant & Dec's Saturday Night Takeaway	Himself	Guest and Undercover Victim; Series 12 Episode 1
2016	Loose Women	Guest Panellist	1 episode
2016	Top of the Pops	Performer	1 episode
2016–2023	Michael McIntyre's Big Show	Performer	3 episodes
2017	John Bishop: In Conversation With...	Himself	Guest; Series 2 Episode 2
2017	Let It Shine	Performer	1 episode
2018	Happy Hour with Olly Murs	Presenter	
2018–2019	Saturday Mash-Up!	Himself	2 episodes
2018–2023	The Voice UK	Coach / Judge	6 seasons
2019	All Round to Mrs. Brown's	Himself	Series 3 Episode 2
2019	101 Dalmatian Street	Spike (voice)	Episode: "A Summer to Remember"
2019	Spies in Disguise	Junior Agent #1 (voice)	
2021	The Cube	Celebrity Contestant	1 episode
2022–2023	Starstruck	Presenter	
2024	Who Do You Think You Are	Himself	Series 22 Episode 7
2025	Michael McIntyre's Big Show	Himself	Celebrity guest on "TV Takeover" segment
2026	The Masked Singer	Mole-Dommett	6 episodes (including one episode as a guest panelist)

== Awards and nominations ==
=== BBC Radio 1 Teen Awards ===
Year	Nominated	Award	Result
2011	Olly Murs	Best British Album	Nominated
2013	Olly Murs	Best British Solo Artist	Nominated

=== BRIT Awards ===
Year	Nominated	Award	Result
2011	"Please Don't Let Me Go"	British Single of the Year	Nominated
2012	"Heart Skips a Beat" (featuring Rizzle Kicks)	British Single of the Year	Nominated
2013	Olly Murs	British Male Solo Artist	Nominated
2013	"Troublemaker" (featuring Flo Rida)	British Single of the Year	Nominated
2014	"Dear Darlin'"	British Single of the Year	Nominated
2016	"Up" (featuring Demi Lovato)	British Single of the Year	Nominated

=== Ivor Novello Award ===
Year	Won	Award	Result
2013	"Dance with Me Tonight"	Most Performed Work	Nominated
2014	"Troublemaker"	Most Performed Work	Nominated

=== MTV Europe Music Awards ===
Year	Nominated	Award	Result
2013	Olly Murs	Best UK & Ireland Act	Nominated

=== UK Music Video Awards ===
Year	Won	Award	Results
2013	Right Place Right Time	Best Music Ad – TV or Online	Nominated

=== Goldene Kamera Awards ===
Year	Nominated	Award	Result
2015	Olly Murs	Best International Music	Nominated

=== Nickelodeon Kids' Choice Awards ===
Year	Nominated	Award	Result
2017	Olly Murs	UK Male Solo Megastar	Winner
