= Angel Tears =

Angel tears or variants may refer to:

- Angel's tears, which are three different plants.

== Music ==
- Angel Tears (duo), an Israeli-UK fusion electronica duo.
- "Angel Tears" (song), a song by Barrie-James O'Neill.
- "Angel Tears", a song by Pelican from the album Australasia (album).

== Other ==
- AquaNox: The Angel's Tears, an installment of AquaNox, a submarine game.
- Angel tears cake (Слезы Ангела), a Russian variant of the Swedish Ostkaka curd meringue pie.
