= Rescue Me (Ultra song) =

Single by Ultra

from the album Ultra
- Released: 4 January 1999
- Genre: Pop
- Length: 3:45
- Label: East West Records; Warner Music
- Songwriters: James Hearn; Jon O'Mahony; Keri Schmidt
- Producer: Ian Stanley

Ultra singles chronology
| "The Right Time" (1998) | "Rescue Me" (1999) | "Blind to the Groove" (1999) |

"Rescue Me" is a song by British group Ultra. It was released on 4 January 1999 on in the United Kingdom through East West Records as the fourth single from their debut album, Ultra (1999). It was the group's first and only top ten single. B-side "Somebody" is a cover of the Depeche Mode song and was released in limited edition only.

The song is structured as a gradually building pop ballad, beginning with soft piano and subtle synths before expanding into a wide, expressive chorus. The lyrics follow this progression by presenting a narrator who acknowledges mistakes in a relationship, expresses a desire for reconciliation, and seeks emotional guidance, balancing introspective moments with direct appeals for the partner’s return.

The music video adopts a winter setting inside a sports centre, featuring the group moving through snow-covered spaces and interacting with a female figure styled with an "ice queen" aesthetic. The visual palette relies on cool tones and restrained lighting, creating an atmosphere that aligns with the track's introspective mood.

== Track listing ==
CD1 (EW193CD1)

1. "Rescue Me" (Ultra Radio Edit) - 3:45
2. "Rescue Me" (Steelworks 12" Mix) - 5:47
3. "Rescue Me" (Orchestral Mix) - 4:27

CD2 (EW193CD2)

1. "Rescue Me" (Ultra Radio Edit) - 3:45
2. "Somebody" - 3:35
3. CD-Rom Video "Rescue Me" - 3:39

== Charts ==
Weekly charts for "Rescue Me"
| Chart (1999) | Peak position |
|---|---|
| UK Singles (OCC) | 8 |

== Release history ==
| Region | Date | Format | Label |
|---|---|---|---|
| United Kingdom | 4 January 1999 | CD single | East West Records |
