= Chivalry Is Alive and Well and Living in Glasgow =

"Chivalry Is Alive And Well And Living In Glasgow"

Single by Barrie-James O'Neill

from the album Cold Coffee
- Released: 24 March 2015
- Recorded: 2015
- Genre: Alternative
- Length: 4:28
- Label: Acid Bird
- Songwriter(s): Barrie-James O'Neill
- Producer(s): O'Neill

Barrie-James O'Neill singles chronology
"Chivalry Is Alive And Well And Living In Glasgow" (2015)	"Angel Tears" (2016)

Music video
- "Chivalry Is Alive And Well And Living In Glasgow (Official music video)" on YouTube

"Chivalry Is Alive And Well And Living In Glasgow" is a song by Scottish singer-songwriter Barrie-James O'Neill. It serves as a promotional single on 24 March 2015. The song first appeared on his extended play "Hate" (2015), named as his stage name at the time "NiGHTMARE BOY".

O'Neill included the song for his short film titled "SCUMBaG" on 8 May 2015. The following year the song made it on to his debut studio album, Cold Coffee (2016).

== Music video ==
In order to promote "Chivalry Is Alive And Well And Living In Glasgow", O'Neill released the music video on 27 January 2015. Revealed by Pitchfork which was 4 minutes 28 seconds in length.

== Live performances ==
O'Neill performed "Chivalry Is Alive And Well And Living In Glasgow", at the 21st State and Fibonacci at Queen Margaret Union on 8 April 2016. On 8 August 2016 O'Neill performed the song at Stereo Bar in Glasgow, while supporting the band The Holy Ghosts.

== Track listing ==
- Digital download
1. "Chivalry Is Alive And Well And Living In Glasgow" – 4:28
