= Steve Robson =

English songwriter and producer (born 1969)

- Origin: Jarrow, Tyne and Wear, England
- Occupations: Songwriter, record producer, instrumentalist
- Instruments: Piano, violin, clarinet, saxophone

Stephen Paul Robson (born 1969) is an English songwriter and record producer who has sold in excess of 138 million records around the world. He has written and produced 12 No. 1 UK/US singles, 38 No. 1 UK/US albums and a further 41 top 5 UK/US albums and singles. He is Grammy-nominated for Rascal Flatts' “What Hurts the Most”, which also won BMI Song of the Year and a Nashville Songwriters Association International "10 Songs I Wish I'd Written" award. He has won Ivor Novello Awards and Brit Awards for Take That's “Shine” and has had two more Ivor Novello nominations for Olly Murs' “Troublemaker” (featuring Flo Rida) and "Dance with Me Tonight".

== Early life ==
Born in Jarrow, Robson is a classically trained instrumentalist on piano, violin, clarinet, and saxophone. Whilst living in the North East, he spent his time playing in bands and working on various TV shows. He moved to London in his late teens to continue his TV career and there began his songwriting career. He still lives in London.

== Career ==
Career highlights include No. 1 singles for Olly Murs ("Troublemaker", "Dance with Me Tonight", "Please Don't Let Me Go"), Take That ("Shine"), Rascal Flatts ("These Days", "What Hurts the Most", "My Wish", "I Won't Let Go"), Leona Lewis ("Run"), Helping Haiti ("Everybody Hurts"), Busted" ("You Said No"), Westlife ("Queen of My Heart) and No. 1 albums for Little Mix, One Direction, Olly Murs, 5 Seconds of Summer, Robbie Williams, Take That, Ella Henderson, John Newman, Leona Lewis, Westlife, Blue, Faith Hill, Wynonna Judd, Carrie Underwood, James Morrison, and Natalie Imbruglia.

== Discography ==
2020

Artist	Album	Track	Role(s)
Louis Tomlinson	Walls	"Habit"	Co-writer/producer
Ronan Keating	Twenty Twenty	"Love Will Remain" (with Clare Bowen)	Co-writer
Brett Eldredge	Sunday Drive	"Sunday Drive"	Co-writer
Shenandoah & Zac Brown Band		"I'd Take Another"	Co-writer
Lucia & The Best Boys	The State Of Things	"Let Go"	Additional producer
James Blunt	Once Upon a Mind - Time Suspended Edition	"Happier"	Co-writer/producer

2019

Artist	Album	Track	Role(s)
James Blunt	Once Upon a Mind	"Cold"	Co-writer/producer
James Blunt	Once Upon a Mind	"The Truth"	Co-writer/producer
James Blunt	Once Upon a Mind	"Stop the Clock"	Co-writer/producer
James Blunt	Once Upon a Mind	"The Greatest"	Co-writer/producer
Maisie Peters	It's Your Bed Babe, It's Your Funeral	"Look at Me Now"	Co-writer
Zucchero		"My Freedom"	Co-writer
Pink	Hurts 2B Human	"90 Days" featuring Wrabel	Co-writer/producer
Push Baby	D.O.C.	"Mama's House"	Co-writer
Tom Walker	What a Time to Be Alive	"How Can You Sleep at Night?"	Co-writer
James Morrison	You're Stronger Than You Know	"Ruins"	Co-writer
Monica Martin		"Patient"	Co-writer
Ward Thomas	Restless Minds	"It's Not Just Me"	Co-writer
Ward Thomas	Restless Minds	"One More Goodbye"	Co-writer
Etham	Stripped	"Opposite of Loving Me"	Co-writer

2018

Take That	Odyssey	"Said It All (single)"	Writer
Take That	Odyssey	"Shine (single)"	Writer
Take That	Odyssey	"Get Ready For It"	Writer
Olly Murs	You Know I Know	"You Know I Know"	Writer/Producer
Olly Murs	You Know I Know	"Love Me Again"	Writer/Producer
Olly Murs	You Know I Know	"Excuses (single)"	Writer/Producer
Olly Murs	You Know I Know	"Feel The Same"	Writer/Producer
Olly Murs	You Know I Know	"Somebody New"	Writer/Producer
Olly Murs	You Know I Know	"Mark On My Heart"	Writer/Producer
Olly Murs	You Know I Know	"Take Your Love"	Writer/Producer
Olly Murs	You Know I Know	"Talking To Yourself"	Writer/Producer
Catherine McGrath	Talk of This Town	"Lost In The Middle"	Writer/Producer
Catherine McGrath	Talk of This Town	"Wild (single)"	Writer/Producer
Catherine McGrath	Talk of This Town	"Good Goodbyes"	Writer/Producer
Rae Morris	Someone Out There	"Push Me To The Limit"	Writer
Josh Groban	Bridges	"Won't Look Back"	Writer/Producer
5 Seconds of Summer	Meet You There Tour Live	"The Only Reason"	Writer/Producer

2017

Neiked		"Call Me (single)"	Writer
Syn Cole		"Feel Good (single)"	Writer
James Blunt	The Afterlove	"Heartbeat"	Writer/Producer
James Blunt	The Afterlove	"Somebody"	Writer/Producer
James Blunt	The Afterlove	"Singing Along"	Writer/Producer
Earl (singer)	Tongue Tied	"Travelling Heart"	Writer/Producer
Skinny Living		"Fade (single)"	Writer/Producer
Gavin James	Only Ticket Home	"Hearts On Fire (single)"	Producer
Catherine McGrath	Talk of This Town	"Talk of This Town (single)"	Writer/Producer
Catherine McGrath	Talk of This Town	"Through It Was Going To Be Me"	Writer/Producer
Matt Terry	Trouble	"The Thing About Love (single)"	Writer/Producer

2016

Little Mix	Glory Days	"Nobody Like You"	Writer/Producer
Robbie Williams	The Heavy Entertainment Show	"Pretty Woman"	Writer/Producer
Olly Murs	24 Hrs	"You Don't Know Love (single)"	Writer/Producer
Olly Murs	24 Hrs	"Grow Up (single)"	Writer/Producer
Olly Murs	24 Hrs	"24 Hours (single)"	Writer/Producer
Olly Murs	24 Hrs	"Back Around (single)"	Writer/Producer
Olly Murs	24 Hrs	"Flaws"	Writer/Producer
Olly Murs	24 Hrs	"How Much For Your Love"	Writer/Producer
Olly Murs	24 Hrs	"That Girl"	Writer/Producer
Olly Murs	24 Hrs	"Better Without You"	Writer/Producer
Jack Savoretti	Sleep No More	"Start Living In The Moment"	Writer/Producer
The Shires	My Universe	"Naked"	Writer/Producer
Jason Mraz		"Man Who Planted Trees"	Writer
Steven Lee Olsen	All About You		Writer

2015

Olly Murs	Never Been Better	"Kiss Me (single)"	Writer
Nashville Soundtrack		"Holding On"	Writer
Ben Haenow	Ben Haenow	"Start Again"	Writer/Producer
James Morrison	Higher Than Here	"Lonely People"	Writer
James Morrison	Higher Than Here	"Just Like a Child"	Writer
Seafret	Tell Me It's Real	"Wildfire (single)"	Writer/Producer
Seafret	Tell Me It's Real	"Missing"	Writer/Producer
Seafret	Tell Me It's Real	"Be There (single)"	Writer/Producer
Seafret	Tell Me It's Real	"Breathe"	Writer/Producer
Seafret	Tell Me It's Real	"Atlantis (single)"	Writer/Producer
Kip Moore	Wild Ones	"What I Do"	Writer

2014

5SOS	5 Seconds of Summer	"Don't Stop (single)"	Writer/Producer
5SOS	5 Seconds of Summer	"Heartbreak Girl"	Writer/Producer
Olly Murs	Never Been Better	"Wrapped Up (single)"	Writer/Producer
Olly Murs	Never Been Better	"Beautiful to Me (single)"	Writer/Producer
Olly Murs	Never Been Better	"History"	Writer/Producer
Olly Murs	Never Been Better	"Tomorrow"	Writer/Producer
Olly Murs	Never Been Better	"Hope You Got What You Came For"	Writer/Producer
Olly Murs	Never Been Better	"Can't Say No"	Writer/Producer
Olly Murs	Never Been Better	"We Stil Love"	Writer/Producer
Take That	III	"Get Ready For It"	Writer
One Direction	Four	"18"	Producer
Paloma Faith	A Perfect Contradiction	"Trouble With My Baby"	Writer/Producer
McBusted	McBusted	"Air Guitar (single)"	Writer/Producer
McBusted	McBusted	"Get Over It (single)"	Writer/Producer
McBusted	McBusted	"Gone"	Writer/Producer
McBusted	McBusted	"Back In Time"	Writer/Producer
Ella Henderson	Chapter One	"Giants"	Writer/Producer
Ella Henderson	Chapter One	"Rockets"	Writer/Producer
Ella Henderson	Chapter One	"Beautifully"	Writer/Producer
Ella Henderson	Chapter One	"Unfinished"	Writer/Producer
Ella Eyre	Feline	"Alone Too"	Writer/Producer
Lower Than Atlantis	Lower Than Atlantis	"Criminal"	Writer

2013

Cascada	Acoustic Sessions	"Enemy"	Writer
One Direction	Midnight Memories	"Why Don't We Go There"	Writer/Producer
One Direction	Midnight Memories	"Half a Heart"	Writer/Producer
James Blunt	Moon Landing	"Postcards" (single)	Writer/Producer
James Blunt	Moon Landing	"Hollywood"	Writer/Producer
Hayden Panettiere	Nashville Soundtrack	"Hypnotising'	Writer
Mika (singer)	Songbook Vol. 1	"Live Your Life" (single)	Writer/Producer
John Newman	Tribute	"Nothing'	Writer
Rebecca Ferguson	Freedom	"Bridges with John Legend"	Writer/Producer
Cher	Closer to the Truth	"I Hope You Find It"	Writer
The Wanted	Word of Mouth	"Love Sewn"	Writer/Producer
The Wanted	Word of Mouth	"Demons"	Writer/Producer
Eliza Doolittle	In Your Hands	"Big When I Was Little" (single)	Writer/Producer
Eliza Doolittle	In Your Hands	"Let It Rain"	Writer/Producer

2012

Olly Murs	Right Place Right Time	"Troublemaker" (single)	Writer/Producer
Olly Murs	Right Place Right Time	"Right Place Right Time" (single)	Writer/Producer
Olly Murs	Right Place Right Time	"Hey You Beautiful"	Writer/Producer
Olly Murs	Right Place Right Time	"Just For Tonight"	Writer/Producer
Olly Murs	Right Place Right Time	"Sliding Doors"	Writer/Producer
One Direction	Take Me Home	"Summer Love"	Writer/Producer
Christina Aguilera	Lotus	"Just a Fool" with Blake Shelton (single)	Writer/Producer
Paloma Faith	Fall to Grace	"Streets of Glory"	Writer

2011

Cascada	Original Me	"Enemy"	Writer
James Morrison	The Awakening	"I Won't Let You Go" (single)	Writer
James Morrison	The Awakening	"Six Weeks"	Writer
James Morrison	The Awakening	"Right By Your Side"	Writer
Olly Murs	In Case You Didn't Know	"Dance with Me Tonight" (single)	Writer/Producer
Olly Murs	In Case You Didn't Know	"In Case You Didn't Know"	Writer/Producer
Olly Murs	In Case You Didn't Know	"This Song Is About You"	Writer/Producer
Olly Murs	In Case You Didn't Know	"I Don't Love You Too"	Writer/Producer
One Direction	Up All Night	"Everything About You"	Writer/Producer
One Direction	Up All Night	"Same Mistake"	Writer/Producer
One Direction	Up All Night	"I Should Have Kissed You"	Writer/Producer
T-Pain feat Lily Allen & Wiz Khalifa		"5 O'Clock" (single)	Writer
Darren Hayes	Secret Codes and Battleships	"Don't Give Up"	Writer/Producer
Scouting for Girls	The Light Between Us	"Love How It Hurts" (single)	Producer

2010

Alphabeat	The Spell	"Q&A'	Writer
Helping Haiti		"Everybody Hurts" (single)	Writer
Miley Cyrus		I Hope You Find It	Writer
Sarah Buxton		"Radio Love'	Writer
Lee DeWyze	Live It Up	"Say It All Over Again'	Writer/Producer
Olly Murs	Olly Murs	"Please Don't Let Me Go" (single)	Writer/Producer
Olly Murs	Olly Murs	"Thinking of Me" (single)	Writer/Producer
Kassidy	Hope St.	"Hope St.'	Writer
Russell Watson	La Voce	"Someone To Remember Me"	Writer/Producer
James Blunt	Some Kind of Trouble	"Stay The Night" (single)	Writer/Producer
James Blunt	Some Kind of Trouble	"So Far Gone" (single)	Writer/Producer
James Blunt	Some Kind of Trouble	"No Tears"	Writer/Producer
James Blunt	Some Kind of Trouble	"Dangerous (single)	Writer/Producer
James Blunt	Some Kind of Trouble	"I'll Be Your Man (single)	Writer/Producer
James Blunt	Some Kind of Trouble	"If Time Is All I Have" (single)	Writer/Producer
James Blunt	Some Kind of Trouble	"Best Laid Plans"	Writer/Producer
James Blunt	Some Kind of Trouble	"Superstar"	Writer/Producer
James Blunt	Some Kind of Trouble	"These Are The Words"	Writer/Producer
James Blunt	Some Kind of Trouble	"Calling Out Your Name"	Writer/Producer
James Blunt	Some Kind of Trouble	"Heart of Gold"	Writer/Producer
Rascal Flatts	Nothing Like This	I Won't Let Go (single)	Writer

2009

Leona Lewis	Echo	"Stop Crying Your Heart Out" (single)	Produced
Paloma Faith	Do You Want the Truth or Something Beautiful?	"Smoke & Mirrors" (single)	Writer/Producer
Paloma Faith	Do You Want the Truth or Something Beautiful?	"Play On"	Writer/Producer
Westlife	Where We Are	"What About Now" (single)	Producer
Mr Hudson	Straight No Chaser	"Stiff Upper Lip"	Writer/Producer
Jessica Mauboy		"Let Me Be Me" (single)	Writer

2008

Cascada	Perfect Day	"What Hurts the Most" (single)	Writer
Take That	The Circus	"Said It All" (single)	Writer
Take That	The Circus	"Hello"	Writer
Take That	The Circus	"Julie"	Writer
Leona Lewis	Spirit	"Run" (single)	Producer
James Morrison	Songs For You, Truths For Me	"Fix The World Up'	Writer/Producer
James Morrison	Songs For You, Truths For Me	"Save Yourself"	Writer/Producer
James Morrison	Songs For You, Truths For Me	"Love Is Hard"	Writer/Producer
James Morrison	Songs For You, Truths For Me	"If You Don't Want To Love Me"	Writer/Producer
Rooster		I Come Alive	Writer/Producer
Jack McManus	Either Side of Midnight	"Bang on the Piano"	Writer/Producer
Jack McManus	Either Side of Midnight	"Milky Way"	Writer/Producer
Jack McManus	Either Side of Midnight	"You Think I Don't Care"	Writer/Producer
Jack McManus	Either Side of Midnight	"Too Much of Yesterday"	Writer/Producer
Jack McManus	Either Side of Midnight	"Fine Time"	Writer/Producer
Jack McManus	Either Side of Midnight	"Living In A Suitcase"	Writer/Producer
Jack McManus	Either Side of Midnight	"You Can Make It Happen"	Writer/Producer
Jack McManus	Either Side of Midnight	"In the Breeze"	Writer/Producer
Jack McManus	Either Side of Midnight	"She's Gone"	Writer/Producer
Jack McManus	Either Side of Midnight	"Not The Hardest Part"	Writer/Producer
Jack McManus	Either Side of Midnight	"Amy"	Writer/Producer

2007

Rascal Flatts	Still Feels Good	"Here" (single)	Writer
Rascal Flatts	Still Feels Good	"Secret Smile"	Writer
Jason Michael Carroll	Waitin' in the Country	"Love Won't Let Me"	Writer
Jonas Brothers	Jonas Brothers	"Year 3000"	Writer
Ben Mills	Picture of You	"Anytime You Fall"	Writer

2006

Rascal Flatts	Me and My Gang	"What Hurts the Most" (single)	Writer
Rascal Flatts	Me and My Gang	"My Wish" (single)	Writer
Rascal Flatts	Me and My Gang	"Words I Couldn't Say"	Writer
Take That	Beautiful World	"Shine" (single)	Writer
Take That	Beautiful World	"Beautiful World"	Writer
Jonas Brothers	It's About Time	"What I Go To School For"	Writer
James Morrison	Undiscovered	"Undiscovered" (single)	Writer
James Morrison	Undiscovered	"The Pieces Don't Fit Anymore" (single)	Writer
LeAnn Rimes	Whatever We Wanna	"And It Feels Like" (single)	Writer/Producer
LeAnn Rimes	Whatever We Wanna	"Save Yourself"	Writer/Producer
LeAnn Rimes	Whatever We Wanna	"Long Night"	Writer/Producer
Josh Gracin	We Weren't Crazy	"I Keep Coming Back"	Writer
Ronan Keating	Bring You Home	"So Easy Loving You"	Writer

2005

Carrie Underwood	Some Hearts	"Just Can't Live A Lie"	Writer
Carrie Underwood	Some Hearts	"That's Where It Is"	Writer
Natalie Imbruglia	Counting Down the Days	"Perfectly"	Writer
LeAnn Rimes	This Woman	"With You"	Writer
Rooster	Rooster	"Staring at the Sun" (single)	Writer/Producer
Rooster	Rooster	"Joyride" (single)	Writer/Producer
Rooster	Rooster	"Deep & Meaningless"	Writer/Producer
Rooster	Rooster	"She Don't Make Me"	Writer/Producer
Mark Wills		"What Hurts The Most" (single)	Writer
Jorun Stiansen		"This Is the Night" (single)	Writer
Jo O'Meara	Relentless	"What Hurts The Most" (single)	Writer
DJ Sammy		"Long Long Way to Go" (single)	Writer
Tammin Sursok	Whatever Will Be	"Tender"	Writer

2004

Tina Turner	All the Best	"Complicated Disaster" (single)	Writer
Rascal Flatts	Feels Like Today	"Feels Like Today" (single)	Writer
Rascal Flatts	Feels Like Today	"And Then I Did"	Writer
Ronan Keating	Turn It On	"Last Thing on My Mind featuring LeAnn Rimes" (single)	Writer/Producer
Josh Gracin	Josh Gracin	"The Long One"	Writer
LeAnn Rimes		"Last Thing on My Mind" (single)	Writer/Producer
Lonestar	Let's Be Us Again	"Now'	Writer
Lindsay Lohan	Speak	"Very Last Moment In Time"	Writer
Lara Fabian	A Wonderful Life	"The Last Goodbye"	Writer
Emerson Drive	What If?	"What If?"	Writer
Speedway	Save Yourself	"Overdrive"	Writer/Producer
Speedway	Save Yourself	"Genie in a Bottle/Save Yourself" (single)	Writer/Producer
Speedway	Save Yourself	"Talk To Me"	Writer/Producer
Michelle McManus	The Meaning of Love	"The Meaning of Love" (single)	Writer/Producer
Lionel Richie	Just for You	"Long, Long Way To Go" (single)	Writer

2003

Busted	Busted	"What I Go To School For" (single)	Writer/Producer
Busted	Busted	"Year 3000" (single)	Writer/Producer
Busted	Busted	"You Said No" (single)	Writer/Producer
Busted	Busted	"Sleeping with the Light On" (single)	Writer/Producer
Busted	Busted	"Britney"	Writer/Producer
Busted	Busted	"Losing You"	Writer/Producer
Busted	Busted	"Psycho Girl"	Writer/Producer
Busted	Busted	"All The Way"	Writer/Producer
Busted	Busted	"Dawsons Geek"	Writer/Producer
Busted	Busted	"When Day Turns Into Night"	Writer/Producer
Busted	Busted	"Everything I Knew"	Writer/Producer
Busted	Busted	"Without You"	Writer/Producer
Busted	Busted	"Loser Kid"	Writer/Producer
Blue	Guilty	"Where You Want Me"	Writer/Producer
Atomic Kitten	Ladies Night	"Nothing In The World"	Writer/Producer
Wynonna Judd	What the World Needs Now Is Love	"It's Only Love"	Writer
Mark Owen	In Your Own Time	"Gravity" (single)	Writer/Producer
Mark Owen	In Your Own Time	"Head In the Clouds"	Writer/Producer
Mark Owen	In Your Own Time	"Crush"	Writer/Producer
Speedway		"Genie in a Bottle/Save Yourself" (single)	Producer
D.Kay & Epsilon	"Barcelona" (single)	Producer	

2002

Rascal Flatts	Melt	"These Days" (single)	Writer
Blue	One Love	"U Make Me Wanna" (single)	Writer
Faith Hill	Cry	"I Think I Will"	Writer
David Charvet	Leap of Faith	"Jusqu’au Bout/Leap of Faith" (single)	Writer/Producer
David Charvet	Leap of Faith	"Falling"	Writer/Producer
Billy Crawford	Ride	"You Didn't Expect That" (single)	Writer/Producer
Billy Crawford	Ride	"Three Wishes"	Writer/Producer
Aurora	Dreaming	"The Day It Rained Forever" (single)	Writer/producer
Aurora	Dreaming	"Your Mistake"	Writer/producer
ABS	Abstract Theory	"What You Got" (single)	Producer
Def Leppard	X	"Long Long Way To Go"	Writer

2001

Westlife	World of Our Own	"Queen of My Heart" (single)	writer
Sandy & Junior	Sandy & Junior	"Right Thing To Do"	Writer/Producer
Sandy & Junior	Sandy & Junior	"When You Need Someone"	Writer/Producer
Hear'Say	Everybody	"Back Down To Zero"	Writer

2000

Atomic Kitten	Right Now	"Follow Me” (single)	Writer/Producer
Honeyz		"Love To Love You Baby"	Producer

1999

Honeyz	Wonder No. 8	"Never Let You Down" (single)	Writer/Producer
Ultra	Ultra	"Rescue Me"	Writer/Producer
Ultra	Ultra	"Blind To The Groove"	Writer/Producer
Ultra	Ultra	”Say You Do“ (single)	Writer/Producer
Ultra	Ultra	”The Right Time“ (single)	Writer/Producer
Ultra	Ultra	”Say It Once” (single)	Writer/Producer
Ultimate Kaos	The Kaos Theory	”Anything" (single)	Writer/Producer
Ultimate Kaos	The Kaos Theory	"So You Like What You See"	Writer/Producer
Ultimate Kaos	The Kaos Theory	"Smile Some More" (single)	Writer/Producer

1998

Dina Carroll	Dina Carroll	"1,2,3" (single)	Writer
Thomas Jules Stock		"Didn't I Tell You" (single)	Writer/Producer
