= Jon O'Mahony =

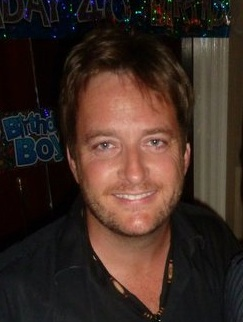

Background information
- Born: 10 August 1973 (age 53)
- Origin: Watford, England
- Genres: Rock, pop, folk, indie, country
- Occupations: Musician, drummer, songwriter, record producer, audio engineer, music manager
- Instruments: Drums, piano
- Years active: 1995–present
- Labels: East West Records 1996 – 2003; EMI Music Publishing 1996 – 2008

Jon O'Mahony (born 10 August 1973) is a British music manager and founder of Rebellion Artists, who currently manage Fraser Churchill, Honey Ryder, Dustin Paul, Starlight Theatre and Fat Buddha.

== Early years ==
Before entering the music industry, O'Mahony had a variety of jobs including working at Drumtech drum school in London, and a stint working as a tennis coach at the Nick Bollettieri Tennis Academy in Florida, where he was also a hitting partner to various up and coming juniors, including the then 12-year-old Anna Kournikova in the early 1990s.

== Music career ==
=== Ultra ===
O'Mahony was the drummer in the band Ultra signed to East West Records (Warner), which was formed alongside James Hearn, James Rose and Michael Harwood who were schoolfriends from Buckinghamshire, England in the mid-1990s. After they left school they formed various bands, playing under names such as Stepping Stoned, Decade and Suburban Surfers (where they signed to manager Tom Watkins). After nine months with Watkins, they left him and found a new manager in Tony Gordon, who had masterminded the careers of Culture Club and Curiosity Killed the Cat. They eventually called themselves Ultra (named after the Depeche Mode album), and the following year Nick Keynes joined as bass player, after being introduced by mutual friend Neil Cowley. Cowley at the time was the keyboard player for the Brand New Heavies, and more recently performed piano on Adele's 20 million selling album 21.

=== Chart success ===
Their demo tape eventually came to the attention of Ian Stanley (ex-Tears for Fears) and they were signed to Warner's EastWest label by Ian and Max Hole, who was later to become CEO of Universal Music Group. In 1998, they released their first single, "Say You Do", written by band member Hearn, which reached No. 11 in the UK Singles Chart. Their next single, "Say it Once", charted at No. 16 in the UK as well as hitting the No. 1 spot in several other territories, including Italy and Australia. Over the next two years they had several singles in the European and Australasian Top 20, and in 1999, their debut album, Ultra, entered the UK Albums Chart at No. 37. Their final single for Warners was "Rescue Me", which charted in the UK at No. 8, the band's only British Top 10 single.

=== Rider ===
Following from Ultra, O'Mahony, Keynes and Harwood formed a new group with a number of different short term vocalists, including Ryan Molloy. Both Alistair Griffin and James Fox also sung with the band at different times. In 2002, and with Molloy as lead singer, the band wrote and recorded a song to celebrate the World Cup, called "England Crazy", which they recorded as a one-off project as Rider with Terry Venables. This project was re-signed to their old record label East West, reaching number 46 in the UK chart. It has since been featured on a number of football-themed compilation albums.

=== Goldust Productions ===
O'Mahony, Harwood and Keynes set up a music production company, Goldust, writing and producing for other artists such as Bryan Adams, Kylie Minogue, Natasha Bedingfield, Gareth Gates, Sarah Whatmore, British Beef and Liberty X. They also wrote music for film, with title tracks on both the Andy García movie Modigliani and Pathe's The Magic Roundabout, as well as working on various Miramax films including Ella Enchanted, Bobby and Awake.

=== Management company and recording studios ===
O'Mahony is the founder of Rebellion Artists, a music management and publishing collective that discovers, develops and manages the careers of artists, songwriters and record producers. The Rebellion office is based in LA Sound Studios in West London, which is home to various other producer/writers including Steve Brown, Richard Spiller, Blue Flowers Music, Tom Garrad-Cole, Chris Hewitt and Martyn Corbet.

== Discography ==
Artist	Release	Label	Credit	Chart Position
Alistair Griffin	– Bring It On (Album)	Universal	Co-writing	No 12 UK
Alistair Griffin	– You And Me Tonight (Single): Feeling Alive; Real World	Universal	Co-writing co-writing co-writing	No 18 UK / /
Awake	– Original Song for Movie Soundtrack	Weinstein Co	Co-writing	
Bobby	– Movie Soundtrack	Miramax	Co-writing, Produced & Engineered	
Bryan Adams & Andrea Remanda	– Believe (Music from the Motion Picture 'Ella Enchanted')	Hollywood	Produced, Engineered & Performed	
British Beef	– Without Me (UK Single): No I Don't Want Another Joint; Crash; No Win Situation; Something Else	Song BMG	Produced & Engineered; Produced & Engineered; Produced & Engineered; Produced & Engineered; Produced & Engineered	
Degrassi Takes Manhattan	– US Movie Soundtrack	Fontana	Co-writing, Produced & Engineered	
Dom Tandy	– Satellite Kiss: Phoenix; My Heart Just Lost Some Weight; Rescue Room	Unsigned	Produced & Engineered; Produced & Engineered; Produced & Engineered; Produced & Engineered	
Doogal	– US Version of The Magic Roundabout	Hollywood	Co-writing, Produced, Engineered & Performed	
EA Sports	– Arena Football: Fifa Street 2	EA	Co-writing, Produced & Engineered	
Honey Ryder	– Rising Up (Album)	HRML / Universal	Co-writing, Produced, Engineered & Performed	
Honey Ryder	– Numb (UK Single): Fly Away (UK Single); Choices (UK Single); Love in Time (UK Single); Rising Up (UK Single)	HRML / Universal	Co-writing, Produced, Engineered & Performed	No 32 UK; No 31 UK / / /
Honey Ryder	– Marley's Chains (Album)	Oceanic / EMI	Co-writing, Produced & Engineered	
Honey Ryder	– Marley's Chains (UK Single): You Can't Say That (UK Single); Worlds Away (UK Single)	Oceanic / EMI	Co-writing, Produced, Engineered & Performed	
Honey Ryder	– Born in a Bottle (Album)	Oceanic / Universal	Co-writing, Produced & Engineered	
Illumina	– CopyK@tz Beware: AlleyK@tz	BBC	Co-writing, Produced, Engineered & Performed	
Jim Bakkum	– Impressed (Album): Dance to the Music (Album); You And Me Tonight	Sony BMG Netherlands	Co-writing co-writing co-writing	No 1 Netherlands; No 1 Netherlands /
Kahlua	– North American TV Commercial	Publicis	Co-writing, Produced, Engineered & Performed	
Keedie	– My Reason (UK Single): Falling; Les Fleurs; Interlude; Angel Child	EMI Classics	Co-writing, Produced, Engineered & Performed	
Kylie Minogue	– The Magic Roundabout (Movie Title Track)	Pathe / Miramax	Co-writing, Produced, Engineered & Performed	
Liberty X & Rev Run from Run DMC	– Song 4 Lovers (UK Single)	Virgin	Produced, Engineered & Performed	No 5 UK
Liberty X	– Thinking It Over (UK Album): Everyday; Right Here Right Now; Breathe	V2	Co-writing, Produced, Engineered & Performed	No 1 UK / / /
Liberty X	– Being Somebody (UK Album): I Just Wanna; Take Me Home; It Helps	V2	Co-writing, Produced, Engineered & Performed	No 1 UK / / /
Liberty X	– X (UK Album): Divine Intervention; Oh Holy Night	Virgin	Produced, Engineered & Performed	Top 10 UK / /
The Magic Roundabout	– The Magic Roundabout (Title Track): Spinning; Lean Mean Fighting Machine; Simply Wonderful; Bust This Joint; Believe Yourself; Hazy; Sail Away	Pathe / Miramax	Co-writing, Produced, Engineered & Performed	
Marli Buck	– White Light (UK Album)	Sony BMG	Co-writing, Produced, Engineered & Performed	
Modigliani	– Title track from Andy Garcia movie	Cutting Edge	Co-writing, Produced, Engineered & Performed	
Natasha Bedingfield	– Unwritten (UK Album): Sojourn	Phonogenic / Sony BMG	Produced & Engineered; Produced & Engineered	No 1 UK
Nell Bryden	– Waves (UK Single)	Warner	Produced & Engineered; Produced & Engineered	BBC Radio 2 Record of the Week UK
Nikki Webster	– This Is How We Do It	BMG Australia	Co-writing, Produced & Engineered	
Phixx	– Electrophonic Revolution (UK Album): When I Fall; Don't Walk Out	Concept	Co-writing, Produced & Engineered co-writing, Produced & Engineered co-writing, Produced & Engineered	
Reborn in the USA (Compilation Album)	– Haydon Eshun 'Misty Blue': Haydon Eshun 'Wonderful Tonight'	Universal	Produced, Engineered & Performed	
Rider feat. Terry Venables	– England Crazy (UK Single)	East West	Co-writing, Produced, Engineered & Performed	No 47 UK
Romtelecom	– European TV Commercial	Grey	Co-writing, Produced & Engineered	
SEAT	– European TV Commercial	/	Co-writing, Performed	
Soccer Mom (film)	– US Movie Soundtrack	Home Journal	Co-writing, Produced, Engineered & Performed	
Sophie Ettinger	– Through The Looking Glass (UK EP)	Unsigned	Produced & Engineered	
Starlight Theatre	The Window; Ghost; Cavalier; Wolves; Want You To Know; Oceans; Sweetness	Imagem	Produced, Engineered	
Ultra	Ultra	East West	Co-writing, performed	No 1 Italy, SE Asia; Top 10 Australia, NZ, Spain; No 37 UK
Ultra	– Say You Do (Single): Say it Once (Single); The Right Time (Single); Rescue Me (Single); Blind to the Groove (Single)	East West	Co-writing, Performed	No 11 UK; No 1 Italy, Australia, SE Asia, No 16 UK; No 27 UK; No 8 UK, No 1 SE Asia; Top 10 Italy, Spain
Ultra	The Sun Shines Brighter	IODA	Co-writing, produced, engineered & performed	
Zoo	– Wanted (Single)	Wright	Co-writing	Top 20 Ireland
