= Come Get Some =

Come Get Some may refer to:

- "Come Get Some" (Rooster song), 2005
- "Come Get Some" (TLC song), 2002
- Come Get Some (EP), 1996 EP by the Gamits
