= Circles and Satellites =

Studio album by Rooster
- Released: 24 July 2006
- Genre: Indie rock, pop rock, hard rock
- Length: 46:07
- Label: Brightside

Rooster chronology
Rooster (2005)	Circles and Satellites (2006)

Singles from Circles and Satellites
- 1. "Home" Released: 10 July 2006; 2. "Good to Be Here" Released: 24 August 2006; 3. "One of Those Days" Released: 2006

Circles and Satellites is the second and final album by English indie rock band Rooster. Released on 24 July 2006, the album spawned the top-40 single "Home".

== Track listing ==
No.	Title	Writer(s)	Length
1.	"Home"	Nick Atkinson, Luke Potashnick, Ben Smyth, Dave Neale, Chris Griffiths, Tony Griffiths	3:37
2.	"I Come Alive"	Atkinson, Potashnick, Smyth, Neale, Matt Wallace, Steve Robson, Martin Brammer	3:10
3.	"One of Those Days"	Atkinson, Potashnick, Smyth, Neale, Wallace	3:57
4.	"Everything Moves So Fast"	Atkinson, Potashnick, Smyth, Neale	3:37
5.	"So Long"	Atkinson, Potashnick, Smyth, Neale, Espen Lind, Amund Bjørklund	4:13
6.	"Maybe I'm Right"	Atkinson, Potashnick, Smyth, Neale	4:01
7.	"Clear Skies"	Atkinson, Potashnick, Smyth, Neale, Robson	3:58
8.	"Get Up"	Evie Sands, Ben Weisman, Richard Germinaro	3:20
9.	"Good to Be Here"	Atkinson, Potashnick, Smyth, Neale	3:39
10.	"Unexpectedly"	Atkinson, Potashnick, Smyth, Neale, Wallace, Andrew Wright, Clinton Outten, Michelle Rowe, Benny Di Massa	3:51
11.	"Halo"	Atkinson, Potashnick, Smyth, Neale	4:32
12.	"Breathe"	Atkinson, Potashnick, Smyth, Neale	4:12
Total length:			46:07

== Personnel ==
Rooster

- Nick Atkinson – vocals
- Luke Potashnick – guitars
- Ben Smyth – bass, backing vocals
- Dave Neale – drums

Additional personnel

- Matt Wallace – production
- Steve Robson – production
- Ash Howes – mixing
