= Say It Once =

1998 single by Ultra

Single by Ultra

from the album Ultra
- B-side: "Shine"
- Released: 22 June 1998
- Length: 3:59
- Label: EastWest
- Songwriters: James Hearn; Michael Harwood
- Producers: Ian Stanley; Steve Robson

Ultra singles chronology
"Say You Do" (1998)	"Say It Once" (1998)	"The Right Time" (1998)

Audio video
- "Say It Once" on YouTube

"Say It Once" is a song by British musical group Ultra. It was released on 22 June 1998 in the United Kingdom through EastWest Records as the second single from their debut album, Ultra (1999). It reached number 16 on the UK Singles Chart and became a top-five hit in Australia, Estonia and Italy.

== Track listings ==
UK CD1 and Australian CD single

1. "Say It Once" (single edit) – 3:59
2. "Shine" – 4:19
3. "Say It Once" (acoustic) – 3:22
4. "Say It Once" (Ultra Mix) – 3:59

UK CD2

1. "Say It Once" (single edit) – 3:59
2. "Say It Once" (Paleface Mix) – 4:04
3. "Say It Once" (Bodger Mix) – 3:43

UK cassette single

1. "Say It Once" (single edit) – 3:59
2. "Shine" – 4:19

== Charts ==
=== Weekly charts ===
Chart (1998–1999)	Peak position
Australia (ARIA)	4
Estonia (Eesti Top 20)	2
Europe (Eurochart Hot 100)	61
Italy (FIMI)	4
Italy (Musica e dischi)	2
Italy Airplay (Music & Media)	2
Latvia (Latvijas Top 20)	11
New Zealand (Recorded Music NZ)	8
Scottish Singles Sales (Official Charts)	15
Spain Airplay (Top 40 Radio)	6
UK Singles (Official Charts)	16
UK Airplay (Music Week)	23

=== Year-end charts ===
Chart (1998)	Position
Italy (Musica e dischi)	27

Chart (1999)	Position
Australia (ARIA)	60

== Certifications ==
Region	Certification	Certified units/sales
Australia (ARIA)	Gold	35,000^{^}
^{^} Shipments figures based on certification alone.

== Release history ==
Region	Date	Format(s)	Label	Ref.
United Kingdom	22 June 1998	CD single; cassette single	EastWest	
