= The Right Time (Ultra song) =

Single by Ultra

from the album Ultra
- Released: 28 September 1998
- Genre: Pop
- Length: 3:45
- Label: East West Records, Warner Music
- Songwriters: James Hearn; Jon O'Mahony
- Producers: Ian Stanley; Steve Robson

Ultra singles chronology
"Say It Once" (1998)	"The Right Time" (1998)	"Rescue Me" (1999)

"The Right Time" is a song by British group Ultra. It was released on 28 September 1998 on in the United Kingdom through East West Records as the third single from their debut album, Ultra (1999).

The song is structured as a "jaunty uptempo punctuated with rousing drum kicks, brass stabs and a buoyant, toe-tapping beat". The lyrics address "walking away from a relationship", but rather than "apportioning blame or ruminating over what’s gone wrong", they focus on "affirming that both partners are capable of more than they’ve settled for".

The music video is set at a house party, showing Ultra performing while guests move around them. The production includes some visual effects, such as multiple versions of James Hearn appearing in a bathroom scene, and several shots stylized with a green tint.

== Track listing ==
CD1 (EW182CD1)

1. "The Right Time" (Radio Edit) - 3:45
2. "Stereotype" - 3:53
3. "The Right Time" (Acoustic Version) - 3:02

CD2

1. "The Right Time" (Radio Edit) - 3:45
2. "The Right Time" (Handbaggers Remix) - 6:20
3. CD_Rom Video "The Right Time" - 3:55

== Charts ==
Weekly charts for "The Right Time"
Chart (1998)	Peak position
UK Singles (OCC)	28

== Release history ==
Region	Date	Format	Label
United Kingdom	28 September 1998	CD single	East West Records
