= Gotta Catch 'Em All =

Gotta Catch 'Em All is the English-language slogan for the Pokémon franchise. It may also refer to:

- The alternative name for "Pokémon Theme", the first theme song of the English dubbed Pokémon anime series
- "Gotta Catch 'Em All" (song), a 2001 song by 50.Grind
