= Deep and Meaningless =

2005 single by Rooster

Single by Rooster

from the album Rooster
- Released: 11 July 2005
- Length: 3:35
- Label: Brightside
- Songwriters: Nick Atkinson; Luke Potashnick; Espen Lind; Amund Bjørklund
- Producer: Steve Robson

Rooster singles chronology
"You're So Right for Me" (2005)	"Deep and Meaningless" (2005)	"Home" (2006)

"Deep and Meaningless" is a song by English indie rock band Rooster. Written by vocalist Nick Atkinson, guitarist Luke Potashnick and production duo Espionage, it was produced by Steve Robson and featured on the band's 2005 self-titled debut album. "Deep and Meaningless" was released as the fourth and final single from the album on 11 July 2005, reaching number 29 on the UK Singles Chart.

== Release and reception ==
After its inclusion on Rooster in January 2005, "Deep and Meaningless" was released as a single on 11 July 2005. It was backed with a live recording of the Blackstreet song "No Diggity" recorded on the BBC Radio 1 Live Lounge show on 29 April 2005. The single reached number 29 on the UK Singles Chart, which was the lowest position of all four singles from the album.

In a review of the album for the website Gigwise, writer Alex Lai criticised "Deep and Meaningless", describing it as a "bog-standard ... ballad" and claiming that only the guitar solo (which was described as "borrowed from Slash") made it "interesting".

== Music video ==
The music video for "Deep and Meaningless" was directed by Robert Hales and first aired in the week of 30 May 2005.

== Track listing ==
No.	Title	Writer(s)	Length
1.	"Deep and Meaningless"	Nick Atkinson; Luke Potashnick; Espen Lind; Amund Bjørklund	3:36
2.	"No Diggity" (BBC Radio 1 Live Lounge Blackstreet cover)	Andre Young; Chauncey Hannibal; Teddy Riley; William Stewart; Lynise Walters; Richard Vick; Bill Withers	3:43
Total length:			7:19
