= Cold Coffee =

Studio album by Barrie-James O'Neill
- Released: 8 April 2016
- Recorded: June 2015
- Studio: MANT (Los Angeles, CA)
- Genre: Alternative
- Label: Acid Bird
- Producer: Rob Schnapf, O'Neill, Scottie Diablo (exec.)

Singles from Cold Coffee
- 1. "Mary" Released: 14 February 2014; 2. "Chivalry Is Alive and Well and Living in Glasgow" Released: 16 March 2015; 3. "Angel Tears" Released: 11 March 2016; 4. "Way Over My Head" Released: 4 April 2016; 5. "Night Burns" Released: 10 April 2016

Cold Coffee is the debut studio album by the Scottish singer-songwriter Barrie-James O'Neill, released on 8 April 2016 by Acid Bird. The album was recorded in June 2015 in Los Angeles, California, United States. It was tracked, mixed, and mastered in 13 days. It was written and composed by O'Neill. Rob Schnapf served as the album producer and mixer. Scottie Diablo as A&R and Executive Producer. Cold Coffee was preceded by the digital release of five singles, "Mary", "Chivalry Is Alive and Well and Living in Glasgow", "Angel Tears", "Way Over My Head" and "Night Burns".

== Promotion ==
=== Songs ===
"Mary" was released as the album's first promotional single on 14 February 2014. The music video was released on 31 October 2013

"Chivalry Is Alive and Well and Living in Glasgow" was released as the album's second promotional single on 16 March 2015. The music video was released on 27 January 2015.

=== Singles ===
"Angel Tears" was released as the album's official single on 11 March 2016

The music video for "Way Over My Head" was released on 10 October 2014. It was released as a single on 4 April 2016.

"Night Burns" was released as a single on 10 April 2016.

== Track listing ==
All tracks are written by Barrie-James O'Neill

No.	Title	Length
1.	"Intro"	0:19
2.	"Pictures"	2:41
3.	"See Her Smiling"	3:58
4.	"Murder Murder"	2:12
5.	"Cold Coffee"	2:22
6.	"Untitled"	3:32
7.	"Chivalry Is Alive and Well and Living in Glasgow"	4:28
8.	"Mary"	4:09
9.	"Night Burns"	3:09
10.	"Way Over My Head"	2:06
11.	"Lonely"	0:28
12.	"Angel Tears"	5:37
13.	"Wherever I Go"	4:38
14.	"Thunder"	3:47
15.	"In The Night (hidden track)"	4:56

== Personnel ==
- Scottie Diablo – A&R, Executive Producer, Project Manager, Art Direction, Artist Management
- Rob Schnapf – Album Producer, Mixing
- Brian Rosemeyer – Engineer
- Mark Chalecki – Mastering
- Solomon Walker – Upright Bass
- Barrie-James O'Neill – Vocals, Guitar, Piano, Mellotron, Drums, Bass Guitar
- Rob Schnapf – Lap Steel, Guitar, Mellotron
- Nathaniel Walcott – Trumpet (track 6)
- Juanita Stein – Backing vocals (track 12)
- Scottie Diablo, Rob Schnapf, Barrie-James O'Neill – Gang Handclaps (track 6)
