= Hope Street =

Hope Street or Hope St. may refer to:

== Places ==
=== United Kingdom ===
==== England ====
- Hope Street, Liverpool
- Hope Street, Weymouth

==== Scotland ====
- Hope Street, in Glasgow city centre
- Hope Street Cemetery, also known as Inverkeithing Cemetery, in Inverkeithing

==== Wales ====
- Hope Street, Wrexham

==== Northern Ireland ====
- Hope Street, Balleymena
- Hope Street, Belfast
- Hope Street, Larne

=== United States ===
- Hope Street, Providence, Rhode Island
- Hope Street, downtown Los Angeles, California

== Fiction ==
- Hope Street (TV series), a BBC television series set in Northern Ireland
- Hope Street, a novel by Terry Deary
- "Hope Street", season 6 episode 9 of The Crown

== Music ==
=== Albums ===
- Hope St. (Kassidy album)
- Hope Street (album), an album and song by Stiff Little Fingers

=== Songs ===
- "Hope Street", by Converge from You Fail Me, 2004
- "Hope St.", by The Levellers from Zeitgeist, 1995

== See also ==
- "A Street Called Hope", a song by Gene Pitney, 1970
