= Numb (Honey Ryder song) =

Single by Honey Ryder

from the album Rising Up
- Released: 28 July 2008
- Recorded: 2007
- Genre: Pop
- Length: 4:07
- Label: Honey Ryder Music
- Songwriter(s): Lindsay O'Mahony, Martyn Shone, Michael Stewart Harwood, Nicholas Iain Keynes

Honey Ryder singles chronology
| "Numb" (2008) | "Fly Away" (2009) |

"Numb" is a single by the male/female British music group Honey Ryder. It was released in the United Kingdom on 28 July 2008 as the first single from their first studio album Rising Up. The song peaked at number 32 on the UK Singles Chart.

== Music video ==
A music video to accompany "Numb" was released onto YouTube on 25 March 2008 at a total length of four minutes and four seconds.

== Track listing ==
Digital download

1. "Numb" - 4:07

== Chart performance ==
| Chart (2008) | Peak position |
|---|---|
| UK Singles (OCC) | 32 |

== Release history ==
| Region | Date | Format | Label |
|---|---|---|---|
| United Kingdom | 28 July 2008 | Digital download, CD | Honey Ryder Music |
