= Home (Rooster song) =

2006 single by Rooster

Single by Rooster

from the album Circles and Satellites
- Released: 10 July 2006
- Length: 3:30
- Label: Brightside
- Songwriter(s): Nick Atkinson, Luke Potashnick, Ben Smyth, Dave Neale, Chris Griffiths, Tony Griffiths
- Producer(s): Matt Wallace

Rooster singles chronology
"'Deep and Meaningless'" (2005)	"Home" (2006)	"'Good To Be Here'" (2006)

"Home" is the first single from UK indie group Rooster from their second album Circles and Satellites. The song reached No. 33 on the UK Singles Chart.

== Track listing ==
1. "Home"
2. "In Your Head"
- "In Your Head", is also included on the Japanese version of Circles and Satellites as a bonus track.
