= The Sun Shines Brighter =

Studio album by Ultra
- Released: 24 October 2006
- Recorded: London, Italy 2005
- Genre: Pop
- Label: Goldust
- Producer: Goldust, M Lister, J Marr, W Page, C Guidetti, S Hanna, A Howes, I Stanley, P Ibsen

Ultra chronology
Ultra (1999)	The Sun Shines Brighter (2006)

The Sun Shines Brighter is the second studio album from English band Ultra, released on 24 October 2006, seven years after their debut album Ultra. The lineup consists of James Hearn, vocals and piano; Michael Harwood, vocals and guitar; Nick Keynes, bass; and Jon O'Mahony, drums and percussion.

The majority of the songs were written by the four original members of the band who reunited in 2005 to write and record it. James Hearn wrote "Happiness". Alistair Griffin wrote "Don't Let Go" and "In Your Smile", and also co-wrote "Feeling Alive". Griffin's vocals have been used on "In Your Smile" and "Feeling Alive", although these appear to have been recorded some time previously, before he re-recorded the versions which are included on his own 2004 solo album Bring It On.

The album was recorded in London and Italy, on the band's own Goldust label. Producer credits include Ian Stanley (who produced their first album), Claudio Guidetti and Ash Howes.

== Track listing ==
#	Song title	Written and composed by	Time
1.	"The Sun Shines Brighter"	J.Hearn, M Harwood, N Keynes, J.O'Mahony, M Lister, S North	3,56
2.	"All Of The Above"	J.Hearn, M Harwood, N Keynes, J.O'Mahony, W Page, J Marr	4,12
3.	"Don't Let Go"	A Griffin	3,22
4.	"Ordinary Love"	J Hearn, M Harwood, N Keynes, J O'Mahony, C Guidetti	3,09
5.	"In Your Smile"	A Griffin	4,12
6.	"I Want You Now"	J Hearn, M Harwood, N Keynes, J O'Mahony, M Lister	3,55
7.	"Whatever"	J.Hearn, M Harwood, N Keynes, J O'Mahony,	3,35
8.	"Wanted"	M Harwood, N Keynes, J O'Mahony, I Stanley, B Hewerdine, N Taylor	3,44
9.	"Right Here Right Now"	J Hearn, M Harwood, N Keynes, J O'Mahony, P Ibsen, M Steer	3,50
10.	"Happiness"	J Hearn	4,15
11.	"Feeling Alive "	J O'Mahony, M Harwood, N Keynes, A Griffin	4,00
12.	"Love At Last"	J Hearn, M Harwood, N Keynes, J O'Mahony, W Page, J Marr	4,15
13.	"Do You Still" (Hidden track)	uncredited	3,88
