= Ultra (Ultra album) =

Studio album by Ultra
- Released: 1998
- Recorded: 1998
- Genre: Pop
- Label: East West (Warner Bros.)
- Producer: Ian Stanley

Ultra chronology
Ultra (1998)	The Sun Shines Brighter (2006)

Singles from Ultra
- 1. "Say You Do" Released: 6 April 1998; 2. "Say it Once" Released: 22 June 1998; 3. "The Right Time" Released: 28 September 1998; 4. "Rescue Me" Released: 4 January 1999; 5. "Blind to the Groove" Released: April 1999

Alternative cover
- Japanese repackage cover

Ultra is the debut studio album by English pop band Ultra, released in 1998 by East West Records (Warner Music Group). Produced by former Tears for Fears member, Ian Stanley, the album was mainly performed and co-written by James Hearn (vocals), Jon O'Mahony (drums), Nick Keynes (bass) and Michael Harwood (guitar).

Before its domestic release in the United Kingdom, Ultra achieved early success across Southeast Asia. Its first singles, particularly "Say You Do" and "Say It Once" helped establish the group in overseas markets. The album was subsequently released in several Asian territories in mid-1998, later extended to Europe, where "Say It Once" charted on the Italian airplay charts and the band performed at the country's Festivalbar.

Critically, some reviewers praised its strong pop melodies, while others criticized it for lacking originality and sounding too similar to other boy bands. By early 1999, the album reached gold-level sales in Italy and Indonesia, and debuted and peaked at number 37 on the UK Albums Chart.

== Background ==
Ultra was a British pop band from Buckinghamshire, consisting of James Herne (vocals), Jon O'Mahony (drums), Nick Keynes (bass) and Michael Harwood (guitar). Formed during the members' school years, the group developed independently by performing in local venues. The band strongly resisted the "boy band" label, since they wrote their own music and played their own instruments. They were managed by Tony Gordon, known for his work with Culture Club and Curiosity Killed the Cat.

== Release and promotion ==
Ultra's international career progressed far more rapidly than East West Records had anticipated, leading the label to release the band's debut album in several overseas territories before the United Kingdom. The group's initial breakthrough occurred in Southeast Asia, where the debut single "Say You Do" gained strong radio support. To reinforce this early momentum, the band spent three weeks in the region in July 1998, undertaking a series of promotional activities. East West released Ultra in Indonesia, Thailand, Singapore, Taiwan, Malaysia, Hong Kong, and South Korea, issuing versions that included additional tracks specifically prepared for the Asian market. The album was released in Japan in 12 October. East West international head Ian Grenfell expected sales to reach 200,000 in Asia alone.

Following the success in Asia, Italy and the Scandinavian countries became the next territories to adopt the project. In Italy, the single "Say It Once" reached number one on the airplay chart, prompting the local affiliate to release the album in mid-September. The band performed "Say It Once" on Festivalbar, one of the country's most prominent television entertainment programs.

== Critical reception ==
Gerald Martinez of the New Straits Times wrote that "Say You Do" is "a sparkling single" with "a great dance beat and great hooks", described "Say It Once" as "a pretty tune", and commented that "this is a very accomplished pop album, with Ultra putting together a distinctively driving sound, with several tunes looking set to make the singles charts".

Caroline Sullivan, writing for The Guardian, noted that although the band distinguished itself from typical boy-band conventions by playing its own instruments, they "sound every millimetre as battery-farmed as their rivals", and "still manage to make each ditty uniquely flavourless, especially in the vocals, where their breathy harmonies are a composite of every other boy group's".

Kris Teo of Sunday Mail wrote that Ultra's songs and combined voices "are so bashful and winsome you’re afraid someone will kick sand in their faces" adding that "that's the appeal of this modest, ingratiating debut", and noting that the songs are "so feathery and melodic that they sound like long-lost Seventies hits", concluding that "they make it work, though, with their soulful musical blend".

== Commercial performance ==
As of October 1998, the album had so far sold 60,000 copies in South East Asia and was selling at a rate of around 5,000 copies a week. In Italy, the album charted at number nine and shipped 44,000 copies by the same date. In August 1998, Billboard reported that, in Taiwan, the group had "paid their lip-sync and album-signing dues and had racked up big sales in the country". In February 1999, the same magazine reported that the album reached gold-level sales in Italy and Indonesia.

== Track listing ==
No.	Title	Writer(s)	Length
1.	"Say You Do"	James Hearn	3:26
2.	"Say it Once"	Michael Harwood, James Hearn	3:59
3.	"The Right Time"	James Hearn, Michael Harwood, Steve Robson, Pete Kearney	3:53
4.	"Blind to the Groove"	James Hearn, Michael Harwood, Jon O'Mahony, James Rose	4:17
5.	"Rescue Me"	Jon O'Mahony, James Hearn, Keri Schmidt	3:57
6.	"Human After All"	James Hearn	3:31
7.	"B.A.S.I.C."	Michael Harwood, James Hearn, Steve Robson, Ian Stanley, Andy Caine	3:51
8.	"Afterlife"	James Hearn, Michael Harwood	4:19
9.	"Up and Over"	James Hearn, Michael Harwood	4:36
10.	"New Dimension Medley: Way to Go/No Place Like Home"	James Hearn	6:36

Australasian edition (CD 2/CD-ROM)
No.	Title	Length
1.	"Rescue Me" (music video)
2.	"The Right Time" (music video)
3.	"Blind to the Groove" (music video)
5.	"Say You Do" (music video)
6.	"Say it Once" (music video)

Japanese bonus tracks
No.	Title	Writer(s)	Length
1.	"Say You Do"	James Hearn	3:26
2.	"Say it Once"	Michael Harwood, James Hearn	3:59
3.	"The Right Time"	James Hearn, Michael Harwood, Steve Robson, Pete Kearney	3:53
4.	"Blind to the Groove"	James Hearn, Michael Harwood, Jon O'Mahony, James Rose	4:17
5.	"Rescue Me"	Jon O'Mahony, James Hearn, Keri Schmidt	3:57
6.	"Human After All"	James Hearn	3:31
7.	"B.A.S.I.C."	Michael Harwood, James Hearn, Steve Robson, Ian Stanley, Andy Caine	3:51
8.	"Shattered Dreams"		3:28
9.	"Afterlife"	James Hearn, Michael Harwood	4:19
10.	"Up and Over"	James Hearn, Michael Harwood	4:36
11.	"New Dimension Medley: Way to Go/No Place Like Home"	James Hearn	6:36
12.	"Say it Once" (acoustic)	Michael Harwood, James Hearn	3:22

== Personnel ==
- Art direction – Paul West & Paula Benson at FORM
- Artwork design – John Siddle at FORM®
- Bass – Nick Keynes
- Co-production – Steve Robson (tracks 1, 2, 4, 5, 9)
- Drums, percussion – Jon O'Mahony
- Guitar – Michael Harwood
- Mixing – Bob Kraushaar (tracks 1, 3 to 10), Andy Bradfield, Steve Robson (track 2)
- Sound Production – Nick Paul
- Photography – Julian Barton
- Production – Ian Stanley (tracks 1 to 5, 7, 9), Steve Robson (tracks 3, 6–8, 10)
- Vocals, piano – James Hearn
- Additional keyboards – Neil Cowley (tracks 1, 3, 4)
- Backing vocals – Keri Schmidt (tracks 1, 2, 5, 8) and Viveen Wray (tracks 6, 7)
- Engineering – Steve Robson (track 1)
- Remixing, additional production – Steelworks (track 3)

== Charts ==
Weekly chart performance for Ultra
Chart (1998–1999)	Peak position
Australian Albums (ARIA)	34
European Albums (Billboard)	89
Italian Albums (FIMI)	9
Italian Albums (Musica e Dischi)	10
Scottish Albums (OCC)	29
Singapore Albums (SPVA)	5
UK Albums (OCC)	37

== Sales ==
Region	Certification	Certified units/sales
Malaysia	—	45,000
Summaries
South East Asia as of October 1998	—	60,000
