= Fly Away (Honey Ryder song) =

Single by Honey Ryder

from the album Rising Up
- Released: 16 February 2009
- Recorded: 2008
- Genre: Pop
- Length: 4:20
- Label: Honey Ryder Music

Honey Ryder singles chronology
| "Numb" (2008) | "Fly Away" (2009) | "Choices" (2009) |

"Fly Away" is a single by male/female British music group Honey Ryder. It was released in the United Kingdom on 16 February 2009 as the second single from their debut studio album Rising Up. The song has peaked to number 31 on the UK Singles Chart.

== Music video ==
A music video to accompany the release of "Fly Away" was first released onto YouTube on 5 September 2008 at a total length of three minutes and fifty-nine seconds.

== Track listing ==
Digital download

1. "Fly Away" (Radio Edit) - 3:44
2. "Fly Away" (Album Version) - 4:18
3. "Fly Away" (Acoustic Mix) - 3:10
4. "Fly Away" (12" Edit) - 7:12
5. "Fly Away" (Karaoke Version) - 4:18
6. "Fly Away" (Ortega & Gold Mix) - 6:19
7. "Fly Away" (Ortega & Gold Dub) - 6:19
8. "Fly Away" (Manhattan Clique Mix) - 6:25
9. "Fly Away" (Manhattan Clique Dub) - 6:20
10. "Fly Away" (Papercuts 'Rife Mix) - 4:27
11. "Fly Away" (Fat Buddha Mix) - 5:38
12. "Fly Away" (Absolewt Space Mix) - 6:00
13. "Fly Away" (All Night Party's Mix) - 6:45
14. "Fly Away" (Howlin Wolf Mix) - 4:27
15. "Fly Away" (Live at British Grove) - 4:29
16. "Fly Away" (Magnificent Juxtaposition Mix) - 6:24

== Chart performance ==
| Chart (2009) | Peak position |
|---|---|
| UK Singles (OCC) | 31 |

== Release history ==
| Region | Date | Format | Label |
|---|---|---|---|
| United Kingdom | 16 February 2009 | Digital Download, CD | Honey Ryder Music |
