= Come Get Some (Rooster song) =

2004 single by Rooster

Single by Rooster

from the album Rooster
- B-side: "Come Get Some" (acoustic version)
- Released: 11 October 2004
- Length: 3:06
- Label: Brightside
- Songwriters: Nick Atkinson; Charlie Grant; Peter Woodroffe
- Producers: Peter Woodroffe; Charlie Grant

Rooster singles chronology
"Come Get Some" (2004)	"Staring at the Sun" (2005)

"Come Get Some" is a song by English indie rock band Rooster, featured on their self-titled debut album (2005). Written by vocalist Nick Atkinson and producers Charlie Grant and Peter Woodroffe, the song was released as the lead single from the album on 11 October 2004, reaching number seven on the UK Singles Chart and topping the UK Rock Chart. It was also a hit in Australasia in 2005, peaking at number 38 in Australia and number 22 in New Zealand. In Ireland, the song was less successful, reaching number 46.

== Track listings ==
All songs were written by Nick Atkinson, Charlie Grant, and Peter Woodroffe except "You're So Right for Me" by Atkinson, Luke Potashnick, Chris Griffiths, and Tony Griffiths.

UK CD1 and 7-inch single

1. "Come Get Some" (album version)
2. "Come Get Some" (acoustic version)

UK CD2

1. "Come Get Some"
2. "Come Get Some" (acoustic version)
3. Album sampler: "Platinum Blind", "To Die For", "You're So Right for Me"
4. "Come Get Some" (video)

== Charts ==
=== Weekly charts ===
Chart (2004–2005)	Peak position
Australia (ARIA)	38
Ireland (IRMA)	46
New Zealand (Recorded Music NZ)	22
Scottish Singles Sales (Official Charts)	6
UK Singles (Official Charts)	7
UK Rock & Metal (Official Charts)	1

=== Year-end charts ===
Chart (2004)	Position
UK Singles (OCC)	191
