= Rooster (band) =

English rock band

- Origin: Eastbourne, England
- Genres: Hard rock; pop rock; indie rock
- Years active: 2003–2007
- Labels: Brightside; Sony BMG
- Past members: Nick Atkinson; Luke Potashnick; Ben Smyth; Dave Neale

Rooster were an English rock (hard and indie) band from Eastbourne. Formed in late 2003, the group featured former 50.Grind vocalist Nick Atkinson, alongside guitarist Luke Potashnick, bassist Ben Smyth and drummer Dave Neale. Signed to Sony label Brightside Recordings, the band released their debut album Rooster in 2005, which reached number 3 on the UK Albums Chart. The group's second album Circles and Satellites followed in 2006, before they broke up in 2007.

== History ==
=== 2003–2005: Early years and debut album ===
After his previous band 50.Grind broke up, singer Nick Atkinson formed Rooster with childhood friend Luke Potashnick, who had attended Eastbourne College with him on guitar. The pair began writing songs together, before enlisting drummer Dave Neale (who had previously toured with Potashnick) and then bassist Ben Smyth (after advertising the role in the music press) to complete the lineup of the band in late 2003. The name Rooster was chosen based on that of a horse on which Atkinson won £250 in a bet.

Rooster signed with Hugh Goldsmith's Sony BMG sub-label Brightside Recordings and recorded their debut album with producers including Steve Robson, Pete Woodroffe and Charlie Grant. The band released their first single "Come Get Some" on 11 October 2004, which reached number 7 on the UK Singles Chart. Also in 2004, the group became the first to broadcast a live performance over the 3G mobile phone network. "Staring at the Sun" followed on 10 January 2005, which peaked at number 5 on the UK Singles Chart.

Two weeks after "Staring at the Sun", Rooster's self-titled debut album was released on 24 January 2005. The album reached number 3 on the UK Albums Chart, behind Push the Button by The Chemical Brothers and Hot Fuss by The Killers, and as of July 2006 had sold over 500,000 copies, approximately half of which were in the UK. "You're So Right for Me" and "Deep and Meaningless" were released as the final two singles from the album, reaching 14 and 29 on the UK Singles Chart, respectively. Rooster toured in promotion of the album, reportedly playing a total of over 150 shows in 2005.

=== 2005–2007: Second album and breakup ===
After promotion of their self-titled debut album, Rooster recorded the follow-up with producer Matt Wallace in Los Angeles, California. The resulting album, Circles and Satellites, was originally released in Japan in June 2006, where it reached the top ten of the Oricon Albums Chart. The lead single from the album, "Home", was released in July and reached number 33 on the UK Singles Chart. Circles and Satellites was subsequently delayed, after a planned release on 24 July, eventually being released in the UK on 2 October. It reached number 192 on the chart.

The band toured extensively in promotion of the release, with regular support band GetAmped joined on each date by various local acts nominated by fans. "Good to Be Here", which was also featured on the soundtrack to the film Stormbreaker, was released as the second single from the album, but failed to chart.

In 2007, Rooster announced on their Myspace page that they had broken up. Since the group's disbandment, Atkinson has played in the band The Ya Ya Boys and written songs for artists such as Boyzone and Gabrielle Aplin, while Potashnick has joined The Temperance Movement and performed with artists including Olly Murs and One Direction.

== Band members ==
- Nick Atkinson – lead vocals
- Luke Potashnick – guitar
- Ben Smyth – bass guitar, backing vocals
- Dave Neale – drums

== Discography ==
=== Studio albums ===
List of studio albums, with selected chart positions
Title	Album details	Peak chart positions				
Title	Album details	UK	AUS	IRL	JPN	SCO
Rooster	Released: 24 January 2005; Label: Brightside; Format: CD	3	57	26	130	3
Circles and Satellites	Released: 21 June 2006; Label: Brightside; Format: CD	192	—	—	10	—
"—" denotes a release that did not chart or was not issued in that region.

=== Singles ===
List of singles, with selected chart positions, showing year released and album name
Title	Year	Peak chart positions							Album
Title	Year	UK	UK Down.	UK Phys.	UK Rock	AUS	IRL	NZ	Album
"Come Get Some"	2004	7	19	7	1	38	46	22	Rooster
"Staring at the Sun"	2005	5	11	5	—	—	33	—	Rooster
"You're So Right for Me"	2005	14	38	14	—	—	39	—	Rooster
"Deep and Meaningless"	2005	29	—	27	—	—	—	—	Rooster
"Home"	2006	33	59	25	—	—	—	—	Circles and Satellites
"Good to Be Here"	2006	—	—	—	—	—	—	—	Circles and Satellites
"—" denotes a release that did not chart or was not issued in that region.

=== Video albums ===
List of video albums, with selected chart positions
Title	Album details	Charts
Title	Album details	JPN
Debut Live in Japan at Budokan	Released: 9 November 2005; Label: Brightside; Format: DVD	173
