= Fatost =

Traditional sweet dish from northern Sweden

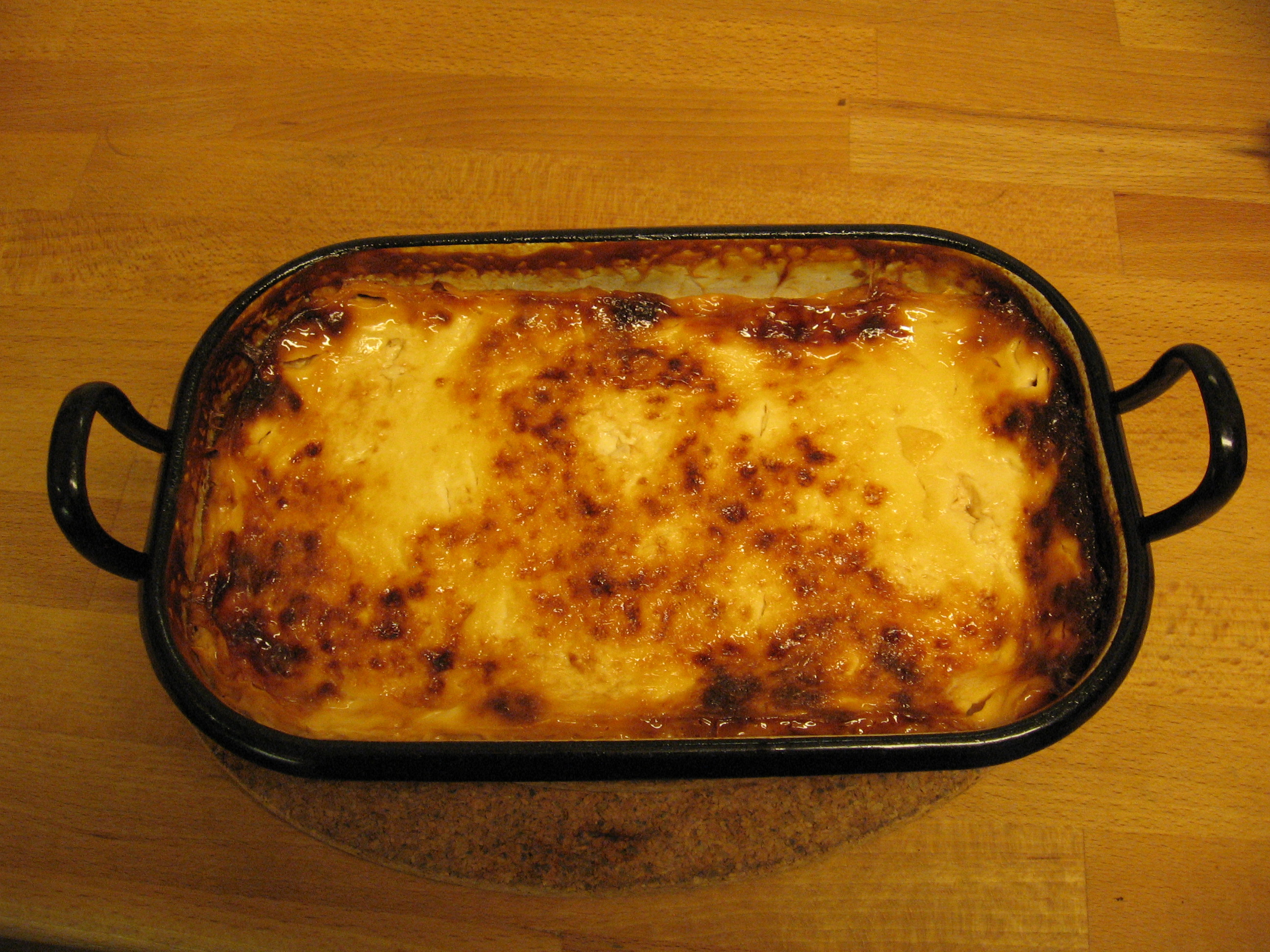
- Type: Dessert
- Place of origin: Sweden
- Region or state: Norrland
- Main ingredients: Milk, rennet, syrup, sugar, wheat flour, eggs, cinnamon, cardamom

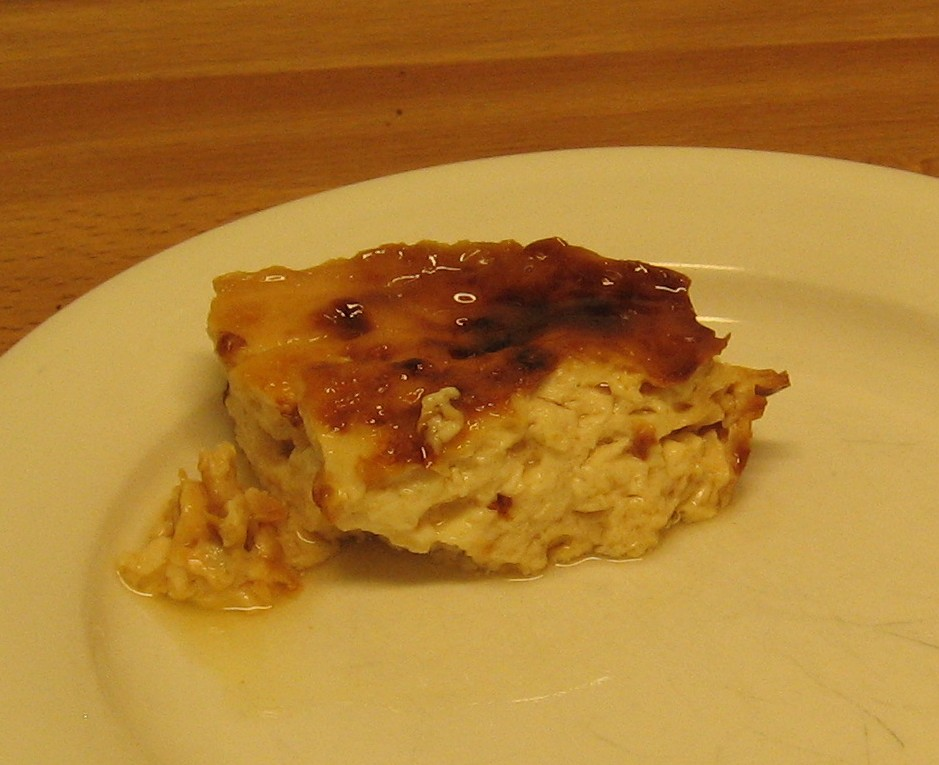
A piece of fatost

Fatost is a specialty food from northern Sweden, commonly eaten around Christmas. The recipe varies, but it usually consists of milk, rennet, syrup, sugar, wheat flour and eggs. Cinnamon and cardamom are also common.

== See also ==
- Ostkaka
