= Say You Do (Ultra song) =

Single by Ultra

from the album Ultra
- Released: 6 April 1998
- Genre: Pop
- Length: 3:39
- Label: East West Records, Warner Music
- Songwriter: James Hearn
- Producers: Ian Stanley; Steve Robson

Ultra singles chronology
"Say You Do" (1998)	"Say It Once" (1998)

"Say You Do" is the debut single by British group Ultra. It was released on 6 April 1998 on CD single in the United Kingdom through East West Records as the first single from their debut album, Ultra (1999). The music video was directed by Katie Bell.

== Critical reception ==
Music Week wrote "simply, the hook is not strong enough and the song goes nowhere", adding that while the band want to be the new Wham! and cite The Beatles as influences, "that is asking too much".

The Birmingham Mail wrote that "other cuts from the guys suggest a more mature approach and a whole host of 1980s influences" but considered "Say You Do" a "bland boy band sound does little for this predictable outing".

== Commercial performance ==
"Say You Do" debuted and peaked at number 11 in the United Kingdom. It spent 10 weeks in the top 100.

== Track listing ==
CD1 (EW124CD)

1. "Say You Do" – 3:39
2. "Whatever" – 3:44
3. "Evolution" – 3:43

CD2 (EW124CD2)

1. "Say You Do" – 3:26
2. "Say You Do" (extended version) – 5:40
3. "Human After All" – 3:31
4. "Say You Do" (CD-ROM video) – 3:40

Vinyl (SAM3187)

- Side A: "Say You Do" – 3:39
- Side B: "Say You Do" (extended version) – 5:40

== Charts ==
Weekly chart performance for "Say You Do"
Chart (1998–1999)	Peak position
Australia (ARIA)	58
Iceland (Íslenski Listinn Topp 40)	17
New Zealand (Recorded Music NZ)	18
UK Singles (OCC)	11

== Release history ==
Release history for "Say You Do"
Region	Date	Format	Label
United Kingdom	6 April 1998	CD single	East West
