= You're So Right for Me =

2005 single by Rooster

Single by Rooster

from the album Rooster
- Released: 25 April 2005
- Length: 3:29
- Label: Brightside
- Songwriters: Nick Atkinson; Luke Potashnick; Chris Griffiths; Tony Griffiths
- Producers: Chris Griffiths; Tony Griffiths; Mark Wallis; David Ruffy

Rooster singles chronology
"Staring at the Sun" (2005)	"You're So Right for Me" (2005)	"Deep and Meaningless" (2005)

"You're So Right for Me" is a song by English hard rock band Rooster. Written by vocalist Nick Atkinson, guitarist Luke Potashnick and production duo Chris and Tony Griffiths, who co-produced the track with Mark Wallis and David Ruffy, it was featured on the band's 2005 self-titled debut album. "You're So Right for Me" was released as the third single from the album on 25 April 2005, reaching number 14 on the UK Singles Chart and number 39 on the Irish Singles Chart.

== Release and reception ==
After its inclusion on Rooster in January 2005, "You're So Right for Me" was released as the third single from the album on 25 April 2005. It was backed with live recordings of the Cream song "Sunshine of Your Love" and the previously unreleased track "Bulletproof". The single reached number 14 on the UK Singles Chart and number 39 on the Irish Singles Chart.

In a review of the album for the website Gigwise, writer Alex Lai praised "You're So Right for Me" for "picking up the pace" after preceding track "To Die For", but concluded by claiming that it "isn't their best work".

== Music video ==
The music video for "You're So Right for Me" was directed by Jake Nava and first aired in the week of 11 April 2005.

== Track listings ==
CD single
No.	Title	Writer(s)	Length
1.	"You're So Right for Me"	Nick Atkinson; Luke Potashnick; Chris Griffiths; Tony Griffiths
2.	"Bulletproof" (live)	Atkinson; Charles Lockwood; Pete Woodroffe

Enhanced CD single
No.	Title	Writer(s)	Length
1.	"You're So Right for Me" (single version)	Atkinson; Potashnick; C. Griffiths; T. Griffiths	3:09
2.	"You're So Right for Me" (alternative mix)	Atkinson; Potashnick; C. Griffiths; T. Griffiths	3:04
3.	"Sunshine of Your Love" (live Cream cover)	Jack Bruce; Eric Clapton; Pete Brown	2:42
Total length:			8:55

DVD single
No.	Title	Writer(s)	Length
1.	"You're So Right for Me"	Atkinson; Potashnick; C. Griffiths; T. Griffiths
2.	"Staring at the Sun"	Atkinson; Potashnick; Steve Robson
3.	"Rooster on Tour"

== Charts ==
Chart (2005)	Peak position
Ireland (IRMA)	39
Scotland Singles (OCC)	14
UK Singles (OCC)	14
