= One Man Army (Kassidy album) =

Studio album by Kassidy
- Released: 30 April 2012
- Genre: Alternative rock, folk rock
- Length: 43:29
- Label: Mercury
- Producer: Jim Abbiss

Kassidy chronology
| Hope St. (2011) | One Man Army (2012) | People Like Me (2013) |

Professional ratings
Review scores
| Source | Rating |
|---|---|
| AllMusic | 3/5 stars |
| The Guardian | 3/5 stars |
| musicOMH | 2/5 stars |
| The Skinny | 2/5 stars |

One Man Army is the second album by Scottish alternative folk rock band Kassidy. The album was released on 27 September 2012 through Mercury Records.

== Production ==
The album was recorded at Rockfield Studios in a week.

== Critical reception ==
The Guardian wrote that the band "certainly fall back on derivative harmonic techniques – any resemblance to Crosby, Stills & Nash is, presumably, intentional – and aim for a sweetly emollient guitar sound rather than originality." The Skinny wrote that "Kassidy seem to have taken every single step to be as inoffensive as possible."

== Track listing ==
| No. | Title | Length |
|---|---|---|
| 1. | "Kallisti (ΚΑΛΛΙΣΤΗΙ)" | 0:35 |
| 2. | "Get By" | 3:47 |
| 3. | "Maybe I'll Find" | 3:51 |
| 4. | "One Man Army" | 4:45 |
| 5. | "The Hunted" | 3:56 |
| 6. | "Home" | 3:46 |
| 7. | "Flowers At the Edge of the Rain" | 2:50 |
| 8. | "I Can't Fly" | 3:47 |
| 9. | "Driven by Fools" | 4:17 |
| 10. | "There Is a War Coming" | 3:23 |
| 11. | "This Life Is an Ocean" | 5:10 |
| 12. | "Afterburn" (Hidden track) | 3:22 |
| Total length: | | 43:29 |

Deluxe version
| No. | Title | Length |
|---|---|---|
| 13. | "Anybody Else" | 3:53 |
| 14. | "The Four Walls" | 3:35 |
| Total length: | | 50:57 |

== Personnel ==
Kassidy

- Lewis Andrew - composer, primary artist
- Hamish Fingland - composer, primary artist
- Barrie-James O'Neill - composer, primary artist
- Chris Potter - composer, primary artist

Additional personnel

- Thomas McNeice - engineer, mixing, producer
- Mike Crossey - mixing
- Steve Davis - engineer
- Kieran Logan - drums
- Thomas McNeice - engineer, mixing, producer
- Christian Wright - mastering

== Charts ==
Chart performance for One Man Army
| Chart (2012) | Peak position |
|---|---|
| Scottish Albums (Official Charts) | 4 |
| UK Albums (Official Charts) | 51 |
| UK Album Downloads (Official Charts) | 4 |
