= Angel's tears =

Angel's tears is a common name for several plants and may refer to:

- Brugmansia suaveolens, a semi-woody shrub in the family Solanaceae native to South America, with showy white or pink flowers
- Narcissus triandrus, an herbaceous plant in the family Amaryllidaceae native to Europe, with showy cream or yellow flowers
- Soleirolia soleirolii, an herbaceous plant in the family Urticaceae native to southern Europe
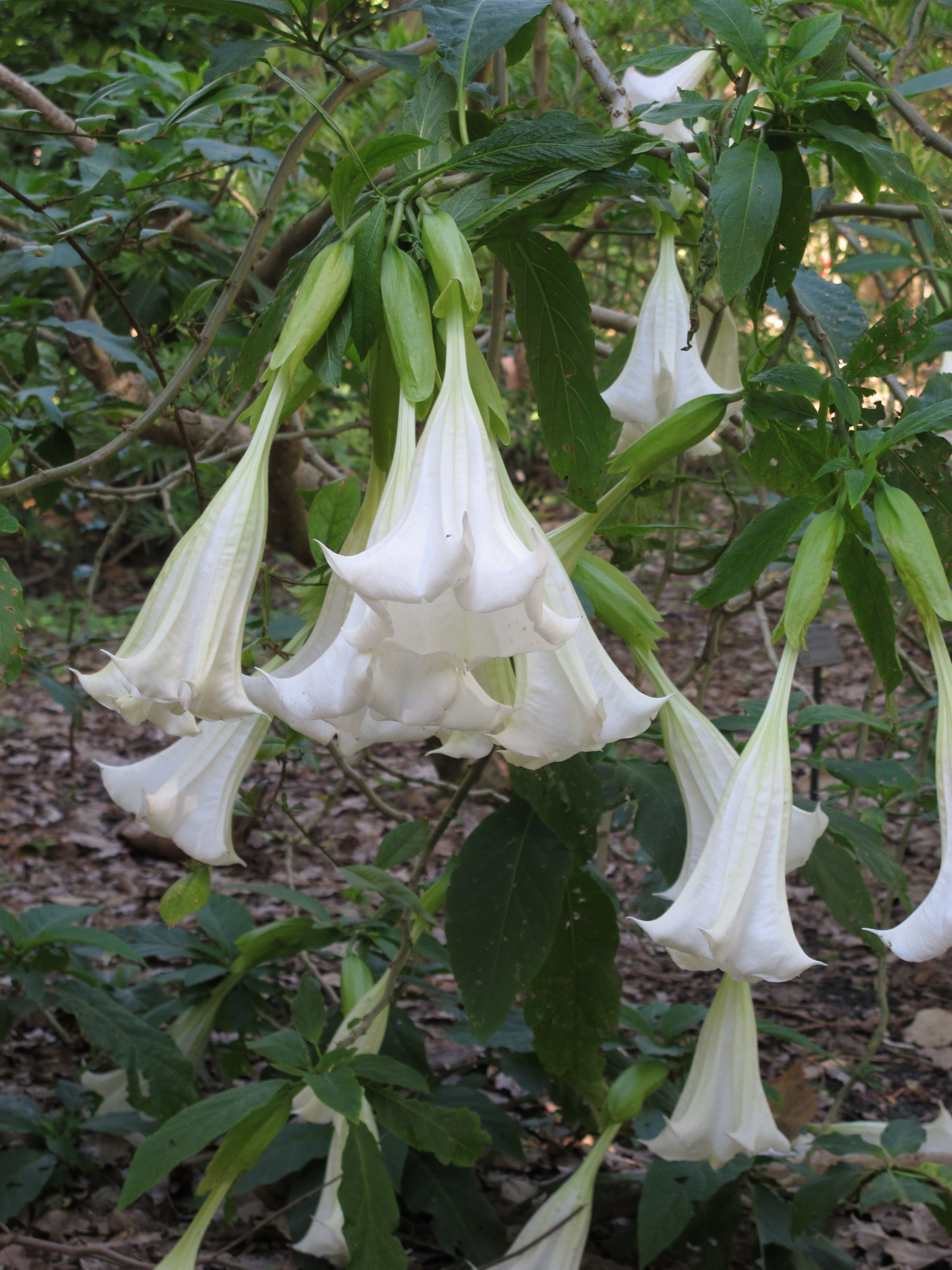
Habit of Brugmansia suaveolens

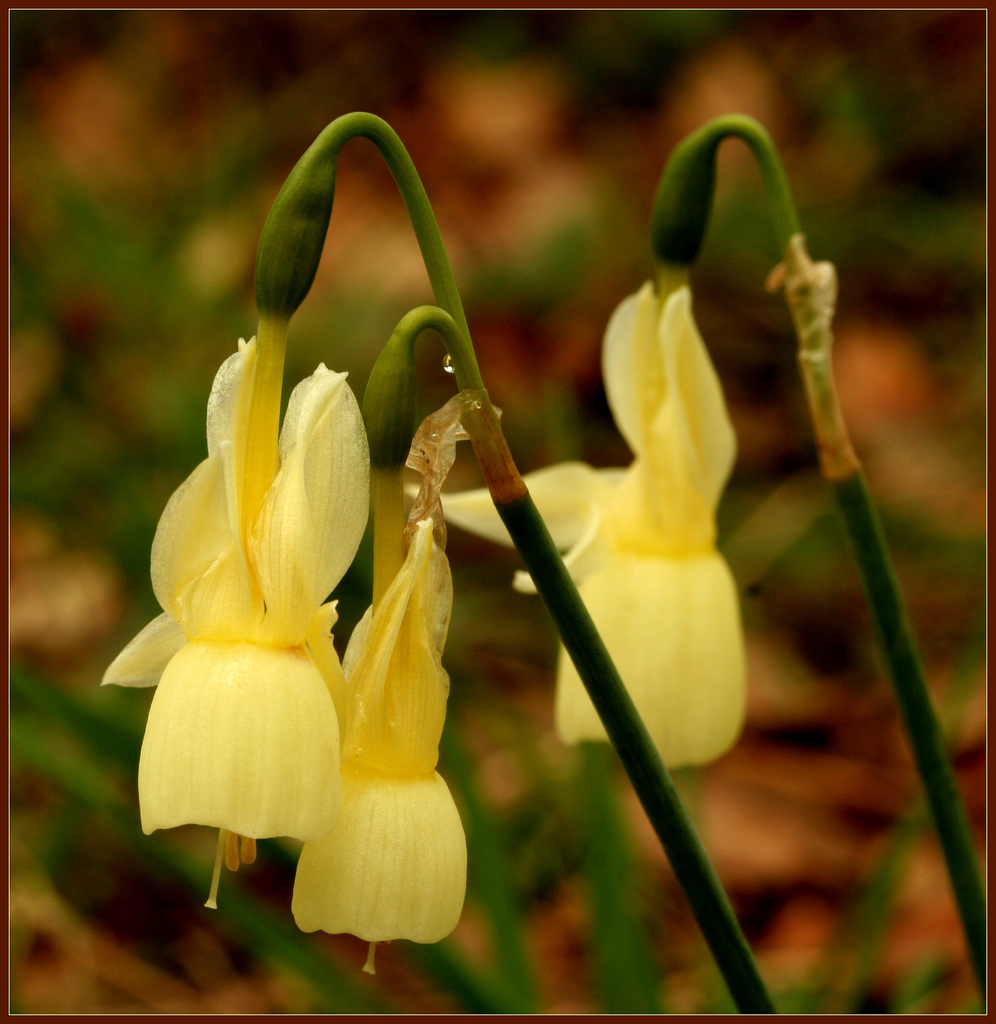
Flower of Narcissus triandrus

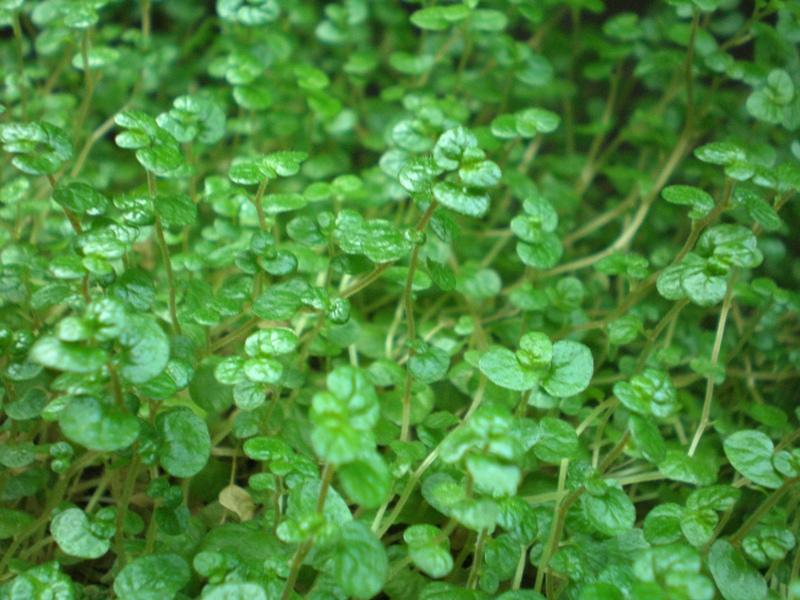
Foliage of Soleirolia soleirolii
