= Ostkaka =

Swedish cake

- Småland ostkaka with strawberry jam, whipped cream and ice cream
- Alternative names: Swedish cheesecake, Swedish curd cake
- Type: Dessert
- Place of origin: Sweden
- Region or state: Hälsingland and Småland
- Serving temperature: Tepid or cold
- Main ingredients: milk, cream, flour, rennet (sugar, eggs, almonds, bitter almond, saffron)

Ostkaka (pronounced oost-kah-kah), ost meaning "cheese" and kaka meaning "cake" in Swedish, is known as Swedish cheesecake or Swedish curd cake. It is a Swedish sweet dessert that has its roots in two different parts of Sweden, Hälsingland and Småland, though there are some differences between ostkaka from Hälsingland resembling halloumi in texture, and the soft-grained ostkaka from Småland. Ostkaka is traditionally made with raw milk and cheese rennet. Ostaka is one of the unofficial national dishes in Sweden.

Ostkaka is known nationwide in Sweden and pre-baked ostkaka can be found in grocery stores there, but ostkaka is particularly popular in the regions of Hälsingland and Småland. The world championship in ostkaka is being held in Hälsingland. In Hälsingland, it is sometimes eaten during the Midsummer celebrations and in Småland during Christmas and local potlucks.

The ostkaka is crustless and commonly enjoyed tepid, paired with a cool jam, a fruit sauce or mixed berries, usually containing cloudberry (mylta) or cherries, raspberry, strawberry, or lingonberry, and poured or whipped cream or vanilla ice cream. The Hälsinge ostkaka is quite smooth, sliced and sometimes a bit squeaky. The Småland ostkaka has a grainy or lumpy texture.

Despite the similarity in literal translation, ostkaka should not be confused with cheesecake. Swedes commonly refer to the latter using its English name, occasionally dubbing it "American cheesecake", to prevent misunderstanding. Nevertheless, Scandinavian restaurant menus occasionally mix up the two.

Similar curd cake recipes are also found in America and Russia, typically under the name "Angel Tears" curd cake.

== Recipes ==
Ostkaka is traditionally produced by adding rennet to a warm milk and flour mixture and letting the casein coagulate. It is then baked in an oven, and gently reheated before serving. It should be served tepid, but never hot, as this will nullify some of its flavor.

=== Simplified recipes ===
Since the process of curdling milk is somewhat complicated, alternative recipes intended for home cooking instead use cottage cheese as a base to simulate the texture of the dessert.

=== Hälsingeostkaka ===
This is only made with the base ingredients, with local variations being some cream or sugar added, but regardless less sweet than the other kind. The press-strained curd is further pressed into a baking dish and baked at medium heat until fully set. Whether it should receive a fine coat of saffron or not is still up for debate.

When cold, it can be stored until serving, at which time it is sliced and reheated in the oven in a bath of cream until it just begins to boil. By the time it is served, the heat should have evened out through the dish to the correct temperature.

=== Smålandsostkaka ===
Cream, sugar, eggs, almonds and bitter almond are added to the curd, which is strained but not pressed, to create a batter that then is poured into the baking dish.

Originally, the Småland variety is cooked in a large copper pot with a thin layer of protecting tin. A legend tells that guests were only allowed to take their portions from the centre of the ostkaka, thereby avoiding the most traces of the copper which may have leached from the borders. It also said that the centre is the creamiest and most succulent, and thus more suited to offer the guests. The rest was saved for the servants and children. Either way, the dish is baked to the consistency of scrambled eggs before taken out.

== National Day ==
Since 2004, the "Day of Ostkaka" is occurs on November 14 in Sweden. It was established and is promoted by Ostkakans vänner ("Friends of Ostkaka"), a non-profit organization founded in 2003.

== See also ==
- Fatost
- List of cakes
- List of desserts
