= Honey Ryder (band) =

British music group

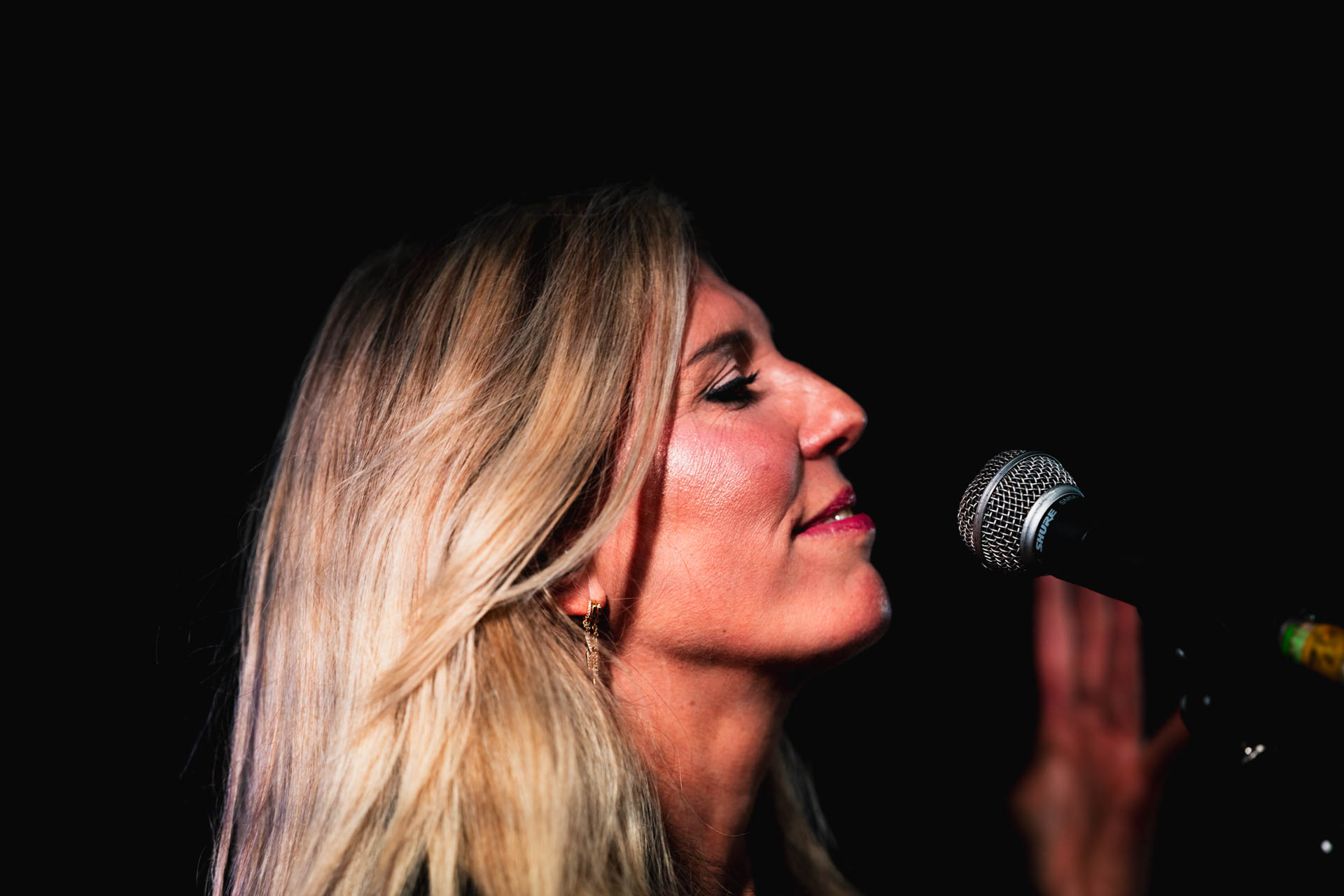
- Lindsay O'Mahony of Honey Ryder in 2024

Background information
- Origin: London, England
- Genres: Folk, Rock, Pop, Country
- Years active: 2006–present
- Label: Oceanic / EMI
- Members: Lindsay O'Mahony; Matt Bishop; Jason Huxley; Sara Eker
- Past members: Martyn Shone
- Website: http://honeyryder.com/

Honey Ryder is a male/female British music group, consisting of Lindsay O'Mahony and Sara Eker on vocals, Matt Bishop on rhythm guitar, and Jason Huxley on lead guitar. The band's style of music varies from rock to folk and indie. Originally a duo, they scored two UK top 40 hits in the late 2000s.

== Early years ==
Lindsay O'Mahony and Martyn Shone came together through a mutual friend at MTV. They then spent several years honing their sound with various bands on the London circuit before striking out on to the commercial scene in 2008. O'Mahony was working alongside the likes of Chris Evans, Edith Bowman, Russell Brand and Alex Zane at MTV, whilst Shone was working as a banker in the city and jobbing as a musician.

== Recording career ==
Rising Up was the debut album by the duo and featured 10 tracks, including the singles "Numb", "Fly Away" and "Choices". The album was produced by Jon O'Mahony who had worked with Natasha Bedingfield. The album was mixed by Brad Gilderman (Madonna, Outkast) and Bob Kraushaar (Pet Shop Boys, Robbie Williams). The album was released on CD and for Digital Retail on 22 June 2009. A fourth single, "Love in Time" (a cover of a Roy Orbison song) was released in July 2009.

After the first album, Shone decided to leave the group for personal reasons. They had been working with musician Jason Huxley, who then joined the band officially. Recruiting a third member, they teamed up with guitarist Matt Bishop while working on the second album. Working in Nashville, they came up with what would become their next single "Marley's Chains". This track was also used on the US ABC networked show Body of Proof. The album, also titled Marley's Chains, was released in August 2012. Three further singles were released; "You Can't Say That", "World's Away" and a cover of John Denver's "Annie's Song". However, none of the releases charted in the UK.

In December 2014, Honey Ryder (with the same line-up as the second album) returned with their third album, Born in a Bottle. The first single from it was "Drink With Me" in March 2015.

In September 2022, Honey Ryder announced the addition of Sara Eker to the band as a second vocalist.

== Discography ==
=== Albums ===
Title	Album details	Peak chart positions
Title	Album details	UK
Rising Up	Released: 22 June 2009; Label: Honey Ryder Music; Formats: CD, digital download	—
Marley's Chains	Released: 6 August 2012; Label: Oceanic Music; Formats: CD, digital download	—
Born in a Bottle	Released: 5 December 2014; Label: Oceanic Music; Formats: CD, digital download	—

=== Singles ===
Title	Year	Peak chart positions	Album
Title	Year	UK	Album
2008	"Numb"	32	Rising Up
2009	"Fly Away"	31	Rising Up
2009	"Choices"	—	Rising Up
2009	"Love in Time"	—	Rising Up
2012	"Marley's Chains"	—	Marley's Chains
2012	"You Can't Say That"	—	Marley's Chains
2012	"World's Away"	—	Marley's Chains
2012	"Annie's Song"	—	Marley's Chains
2015	"Drink With Me"	—	Born in a Bottle

== Awards and nominations ==
Year	Association	Category	Nominated work	Result
2015	British Country Music Association	Group of the Year	Honey Ryder	Nominated
2015	British Country Music Association	UK Song of the Year	Born In A Bottle	Nominated
2015	British Country Music Association	UK Album of the Year	Born In A Bottle	Nominated
