= Rooster (album) =

Studio album by Rooster
- Released: 24 January 2005
- Genre: Indie rock, hard rock, pop rock
- Length: 43:24
- Label: Brightside
- Producer: Steve Robson; Pete Woodroffe; Charlie Grant; Mark Wallis; David Ruffy; Chris Griffiths; Tony Griffiths

Rooster chronology
Rooster (2005)	Circles and Satellites (2006)

Singles from Rooster
- 1. "Come Get Some" Released: 11 October 2004; 2. "Staring at the Sun" Released: 10 January 2005; 3. "You're So Right for Me" Released: 25 April 2005; 4. "Deep and Meaningless" Released: 11 July 2005

Rooster is the self-titled debut album by English indie rock band Rooster. Released on 24 January 2005, the album reached number three on the UK Albums Chart and spawned four commercially successful singles, two of which peaked in the top ten of the UK Singles Chart. The album also charted at number 26 on the Irish Albums Chart. "On the Road" featured in the movie Stormbreaker.

== Track listing ==
No.	Title	Writer(s)	Length
1.	"Joyride"	Nick Atkinson, Luke Potashnick, Steve Robson	3:22
2.	"Come Get Some"	Atkinson, Charlie Grant, Peter Woodroffe	3:06
3.	"Standing in Line"	Atkinson, Potashnick, Rob Davis	3:50
4.	"Staring at the Sun"	Atkinson, Potashnick, Robson	3:50
5.	"To Die For"	Atkinson, Grant, Woodroffe	4:40
6.	"You're So Right for Me"	Atkinson, Potashnick, Chris Griffiths, Tony Griffiths	3:29
7.	"Platinum Blind"	Atkinson, Grant, Woodroffe	3:00
8.	"Deep and Meaningless"	Atkinson, Potashnick, Espen Lind, Amund Bjørklund	3:35
9.	"On the Road"	Atkinson, Potashnick	3:41
10.	"She Don't Make Me Feel"	Atkinson, Potashnick, Robson	3:22
11.	"Angels Calling"	Atkinson, Potashnick, Lind, Bjørklund	3:21
12.	"Drag the Sunrise Down"	Atkinson, Grant, Woodroffe	4:09
Total length:			43:24

Japanese tour edition DVD
No.	Title	Writer(s)	Length
1.	"On the Road" (live at Budokan)	Atkinson, Potashnick
2.	"Come Get Some" (live at Budokan)	Atkinson, Grant, Woodroffe
3.	"Standing in Line" (live at Budokan)	Atkinson, Potashnick, Davis
4.	"Staring at the Sun" (live at Budokan)	Atkinson, Potashnick, Robson
5.	"Platinum Blind" (live at Budokan)	Atkinson, Grant, Woodroffe
6.	"You're So Right for Me" (live at Budokan)	Atkinson, Potashnick, C. Griffiths, T. Griffiths
7.	"Come Get Some" (music video)	Atkinson, Grant, Woodroffe
8.	"Staring at the Sun" (music video)	Atkinson, Potashnick, Robson
9.	"You're So Right for Me" (music video)	Atkinson, Potashnick, C. Griffiths, T. Griffiths
10.	"Deep and Meaningless" (music video)	Atkinson, Potashnick, Lind, Bjørklund

== Personnel ==
Rooster

- Nick Atkinson – vocals
- Luke Potashnick – guitars
- Ben Smyth – bass guitar, backing vocals
- Dave Neale – drums

Additional personnel

- Steve Robson – production on tracks 1, 3, 4, 8 and 10
- Pete Woodroffe – production on tracks 2, 5, 7, 11 and 12
- Charlie Grant – production on tracks 2, 5, 7, 11 and 12
- Mark Wallis – production on tracks 6 and 9
- David Ruffy – production on tracks 6 and 9
- Chris Griffiths – production on track 6
- Tony Griffiths – production on track 6
- Ash Howes – mixing
- John Davis – mastering
- Andy Carne – photography, art direction, graphic design

== Charts ==
Chart performance for Rooster
Chart (2005)	Peak position
Australian Albums (ARIA)	57
Irish Albums (IRMA)	26
UK Albums (OCC)	3

== Certifications ==
Region	Certification	Certified units/sales
Japan (RIAJ)	Gold	100,000^{^}
^{^} Shipments figures based on certification alone.
