= Ultra (British band) =

British boy band

- Also known as: Rider
- Origin: England
- Genres: Pop
- Years active: 1997–2001; 2005–2006
- Labels: EastWest (1998–2001); Goldust (2005–2006)
- Past members: James Hearn; Michael Harwood; Jon O'Mahony; Nick Keynes
- Website: www.officialultra.co.uk (archived)

Ultra (also recording as Rider) were an English pop band, which was most successful in the late 1990s. The original line-up consisted of James Hearn (born 1976; vocals), Michael Harwood (born 1975; guitar and vocals), Jon O'Mahony (born 1973; drums and vocals) and Nick Keynes (born 1972; bass and vocals).

== History ==
=== Early career ===
Although sometimes mistakenly described as a manufactured boy band, Ultra was originally formed by James Hearn, James Rose, Michael Harwood and Jon O'Mahony who were schoolfriends from Buckinghamshire in the mid-1990s. After they left school, they formed various bands, playing under names such as Stepping Stoned, Decade and Suburban Surfers. They eventually called themselves Ultra (named after the Depeche Mode album), and the following year Nick Keynes joined as bass player, replacing Rose, after being introduced by mutual friend Neil Cowley, who was the keyboard player for the Brand New Heavies.

=== Chart success ===
Their demo tape eventually came to the attention of Ian Stanley (ex-Tears for Fears) and they were signed to Warner's EastWest label. In 1998, they released their first single, "Say You Do", written by Hearn, which reached #11 in the UK. Their next single, "Say It Once", charted at #16 in the UK. "The Right Time" was released in September 1998 and peaked at #28. Their fourth single was "Rescue Me", which charted in the UK at No. 8, the band's only British top 10 single. In February 1999, their self-titled debut album, entered the UK Albums Chart at #37.

The band were very popular with young female audiences, although they insisted that their success came primarily from their songs, not their looks. Ultra performed live and also supported a number of other pop acts including Irish boyband Boyzone in 1997, former Eternal member Louise Nurding for a performance at Wembley, and boyband 911. They were particularly popular in Southeast Asia and Italy, where they were mobbed by 3000 teenage girls at a record signing in Milan.

In 1999, they appeared on Italian television where they performed a live version of "Say It Once" with Laura Pausini.

=== Band split ===
The band lost their contract before recording their second album, as all of the record company A&R executives who had signed them had left, and the new hierarchy passed on the opportunity to record a follow-up. The band split up in 2001 after James Hearn became disillusioned with the music business and decided to leave. In an interview with the Daily Telegraph, Hearn said of his time in Ultra: "My music career was great fun and, as a bunch of guys who got together at Leeds University to give the musical bigtime a go, we had a good time".

As of 2015, James is reported to be in the investment banking sector.

=== Reunification ===
In 2005, the four original members of the band reunited to write and record their second studio album, The Sun Shines Brighter, which also features songs written by Alistair Griffin (who provides guest vocals on one of the tracks). Producer credits on the album include Ian Stanley (who produced their first album), Claudio Guidetti (Laura Pausini, Eros Ramazzotti), and Ash Howes (Texas, Blue). This was released on 2 October 2006 on the Goldust label.

== Rider ==
The other band members formed a new group with a number of different short term vocalists including Ryan Molloy. Singers Alistair Griffin and James Fox were both briefly members of the band at different times.

In 2002, several members of Ultra wrote and recorded a song to celebrate the World Cup, called "England Crazy", which they recorded as a one-off project as 'Rider' with Terry Venables. This project was re-signed to their old record label East West, but only reached number 46 on the UK chart due to a lacklustre campaign from the label. The song has since been featured on a number of football-themed compilation albums.

== Goldust Productions ==
O'Mahony, Harwood and Keynes set up a music production company, Goldust, writing and producing for other artists such as Bryan Adams, Kylie Minogue, Natasha Bedingfield, Phixx and Liberty X. They have also written music for films, with title tracks on the Andy García film Modigliani, and The Magic Roundabout.

== Discography ==
=== Albums ===
List of albums, with selected details and chart positions
Title	Album details	Peak chart positions	
Title	Album details	UK	AUS
Ultra	Released: 25 January 1999; Label: East West; Formats: CD, digital download	37	34
The Sun Shines Brighter	Released: 24 October 2006; Label: Goldust Productions; Formats: CD, digital download	—	—

=== Singles ===
List of singles, with selected chart positions
Title	Year	Peak chart positions			Certification	Album
Title	Year	UK	AUS	NZ	Certification	Album
"Say You Do"	1998	11	58	18		Ultra
"Say It Once"	1998	16	4	8	ARIA: Gold	Ultra
"The Right Time"	1998	28	—	—		Ultra
"Rescue Me"	1999	8	—	—		Ultra
"Blind to the Groove"	1999	—	—	—		Ultra
"—" denotes the single failed to chart or was not released.
