= Staring at the Sun (Rooster song) =

2005 single by Rooster

Single by Rooster

from the album Rooster
- Released: 10 January 2005
- Length: 3:50
- Label: Brightside
- Songwriters: Nick Atkinson; Luke Potashnick; Steve Robson
- Producer: Steve Robson

Rooster singles chronology
"Come Get Some" (2005)	"Staring at the Sun" (2005)	"You're So Right for Me" (2005)

"Staring at the Sun" is a song by English indie rock band Rooster, featured on their 2005 debut self-titled album. Written by vocalist Nick Atkinson, guitarist Luke Potashnick and producer Steve Robson, the song was released as the second single from the album on 15 January 2005, reaching number five on the UK Singles Chart and number 33 on the Irish Singles Chart—the band's highest chart positions on these charts. According to Atkinson, the song is "being in love and not realizing that, actually, they're a bit of a bitch. It's how love can blind you to a person's faults. Then suddenly it all becomes clear."

== Track listings ==
"Staring at the Sun" was written by Nick Atkinson, Luke Potashnick, and Steve Robson; "Come Get Some" was written by Atkinson, Charlie Grant, and Peter Woodroffe.

UK CD1

1. "Staring at the Sun" (album version)
2. "Staring at the Sun" (acoustic version)

UK CD2

1. "Staring at the Sun"
2. "Come Get Some"
3. "Staring at the Sun" (acoustic version)
4. "Staring at the Sun" (video)

== Charts ==
=== Weekly charts ===
Chart (2005)	Peak position
Ireland (IRMA)	33
Scotland Singles (OCC)	3
UK Singles (OCC)	5

=== Year-end charts ===
Chart (2005)	Position
UK Singles (OCC)	187
