= Michael Harwood (musician) =

- Born: Michael Stewart Harwood; 12 December 1975 (age 50); London, England
- Origin: Northwood, London, England
- Genres: Pop, rock
- Occupations: Guitarist, producer, songwriter, former model
- Instruments: Vocals, guitar
- Years active: 1997-present
- Labels: EastWest, Goldust

Michael Stewart Harwood (born 12 December 1975) is an English record producer, songwriter and recording artist manager. He was formerly the guitarist for the band Ultra. In 2011, he co founded Tileyard Music.

== Biography ==
Harwood was born in London and lives in Northwood, London, England. Before joining Ultra, he attended City University London and majored in Business studies and Financial Markets. He went to school with two Ultra members, James Hearn was his class mate and Jon O'Mahony a couple of years older.

== Musical career ==
In 1997 he, along with James, Jon and Nick Keynes, formed Ultra and released an album in 1998 named Ultra. As the band finished their second album in 2001, singer James Hearn left the band, and Ultra split. The other three members, Harwood, O'Mahony, and Keynes, formed another group named Rider. Rider made a 2002 World Cup single named "England Crazy". In 2003 Harwood, along with O'Mahony and Keynes formed a music production company and recording studios called Goldust Productions. He wrote and produced for artists such as Liberty X, Natasha Bedingfield, Kylie Minogue and Bryan Adams. He also composed and scored on various Hollywood movies. Ultra briefly reunited in 2005 to record and release a second album entitled The Sun Shines Brighter.

Michael Harwood has co written the Kygo song, "Stole the Show".

Harwood also co-wrote Germany's entry in the 2015 edition of the Eurovision Song Contest for German singer, Ann Sophie.
