= Angel Tears (song) =

Single by Barrie-James O'Neill

from the album Cold Coffee
- Released: 11 March 2016
- Genre: Alternative
- Length: 5:44
- Label: Acid Bird
- Songwriter(s): O'Neill

"Angel Tears" is a song by Scottish singer-songwriter Barrie-James O'Neill taken from his debut studio album, Cold Coffee (2016). It serves as the official first single from the record on 11 March 2016.

== Music video ==
A lyric video for the song was released on 11 March 2016 by Joe Rubalcaba.

== Track listing ==
Digital download
No.	Title	Length
1.	"Angel Tears" (Album version)	5:44
