= 50.Grind =

English musical group

- Origin: London, England
- Genres: Nu metal, rap rock, electronic rock
- Years active: 2001; 25 years ago
- Label: Recognition Records
- Past members: Nick Atkinson

50.Grind was an English electronic rock group, headed up by Nick Atkinson, who then became the lead singer of English rock band Rooster. Their 2001 song, Gotta Catch 'Em All, made #57 on the UK Singles Chart.

== Discography ==
- 2001: "Gotta Catch 'Em All" (single). While it only made #57 on the UK Singles Chart, the song was the only Nintendo-sanctioned single release and the band was interviewed in by the Daily Express newspaper in December 2001. Afterwards, the band performed the song on Nickelodeon UK.
