= Hope St. (Kassidy album) =

Studio album by Kassidy
- Released: 21 March 2011
- Genre: Alternative rock
- Length: 41:54
- Label: Mercury

Kassidy chronology
Hope St. (2011)	One Man Army (2013)

Hope St. is the debut studio album by Glasgow based alternative rock band Kassidy. It was released on 21 March 2011. It shares several tracks with the band's series of Rubbergum EPs released the previous year.

== Track listing ==
All music is composed by Barrie-James O'Neill, Hamish Fingland, Lewis Andrew and Chris Potter.

No.	Title	Length
1.	"Stray Cat"	2:53
2.	"That Old Song"	3:47
3.	"I Don't Know"	3:49
4.	"Waking Up Sideways"	3:36
5.	"The Lost"	3:14
6.	"Take Another Ride"	5:22
7.	"Oh My God"	3:23
8.	"La Revenge"	4:00
9.	"The Traveller"	2:44
10.	"Hope St."	2:41
11.	"Secret Tells a Lie"	2:47
12.	"The Betrayal"	3:38

=== Bonus tracks ===
No.	Title	Length
13.	"People Like Me"	4:14
14.	"I've Seen the World"	4:08

== Charts ==
Chart performance for Hope St.
Chart (2011)	Peak position
Scottish Albums (Official Charts)	10
UK Albums (Official Charts)	55
UK Album Downloads (Official Charts)	45
