= Kassidy =

Scottish alternative folk rock band

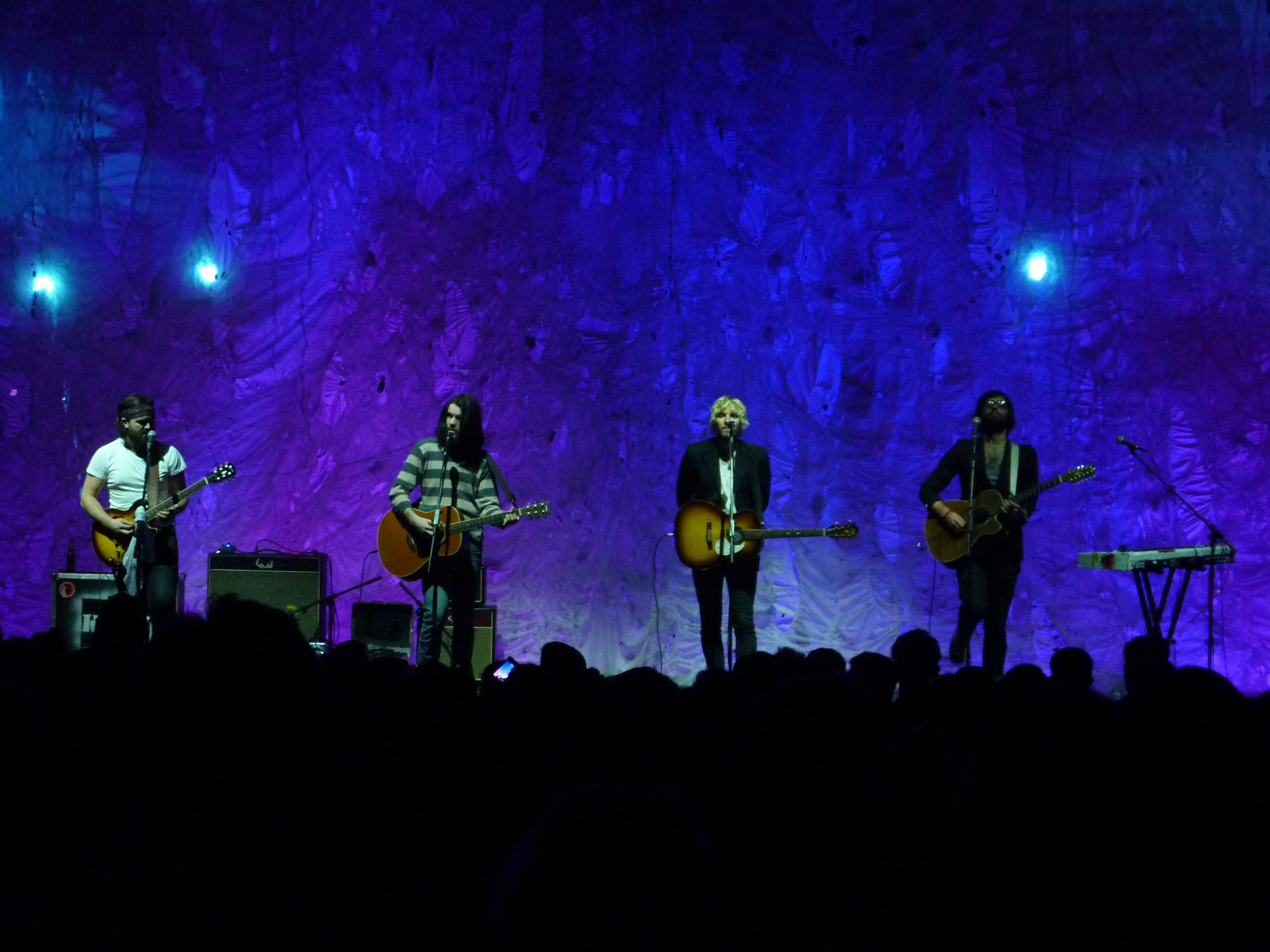
- Kassidy at Hammersmith Apollo on 19 May 2013

Background information
- Origin: Glasgow, Scotland
- Genres: Folk rock; indie rock; alternative rock
- Years active: 2009–2014, 2021–Present
- Labels: Vertigo; Mercury
- Spinoffs: White
- Members: Hamish Fingland; Lewis Andrew; Chris Potter; Barrie-James O'Neill (Nightmare Boy)
- Website: www.kassidymusic.com

Kassidy are a Scottish alternative folk rock band. The band consist of Barrie-James O'Neill (vocals, piano and guitar), Hamish Fingland (vocals and guitar), Lewis Andrew (vocals, guitar, accordion and keyboard) and Chris Potter (vocals and guitar). The band was formed in late 2009 in Glasgow.

The quartet met through friends' bands and fortunate pub encounters. Kassidy began writing and recording their music in a shared house, which they later converted to a personal studio. They released three EP's, the second entitled The Rubbergum EP Volume 2 on 16 August 2010.

To follow their EPs, Kassidy released their debut album, Hope St., on 21 March 2011. They released their second album, One Man Army, on 30 April 2012.

The band toured along with Lana Del Rey from 3 April 2013 to 31 May 2013 on her Paradise Tour in Europe. The same year, the frontman Barrie-James O'Neill collaborated with Del Rey on a cover of "Summer Wine" originally composed by Lee Hazlewood, and appeared in its music video with Del Rey.

On 8 April 2013 the band released an EP album titled People Like Me on iTunes.

On 1 February 2014, the founder and frontman of the band, Barrie-James O'Neill, left the band to move to Los Angeles to be with his then girlfriend, Lana Del Rey, and has since adopted the stage name "Nightmare Boy" as a solo artist. He has released two singles and an EP under that moniker. The band continued for a short while but split later that year. The remaining members have since formed a new band called White, along with Leo Condie and Kirstin Lynn.

On 15 March 2021 the band announced a new single "Don't Worry" to be released on 22 March 2021. This was to coincide with the release of a vinyl edition of their first album and the promotion of a special event to be performed on 23 December 2021, to celebrate the 10th anniversary of their debut. However, on 17 December 2021, the concert was rescheduled to 2 June 2022.

== Discography ==
- The Rubbergum EP (2010)
- The Rubbergum EP Volume 2 (2010)
- The Rubbergum EP Volume 3 (2010)
- Hope St. (2011)
- One Man Army (2012)
- People Like Me EP (2013)
- Don't Worry Single (2021)

== Other sources ==
1. Kassidy Hope St Review BBC. Retrieved 11 July 2011.
2. Introducing... Kassidy BBC. Retrieved 11 July 2011.
3. Scots band Kassidy... Daily Record. Retrieved 11 July 2011.
