= James Hearn =

English singer-songwriter

James Daniel Guy Hearn (born 19 June 1976 in Denham, Buckinghamshire, England) is an English singer-songwriter. He is best known as being the vocalist of band Ultra.

== Biography ==
Hearn had met Ultra's guitarist, Mike Harwood and drummer, Jon O'Mahony, respectively, at school. He was in the same class as Harwood, and O'Mahony was a couple of years older. Hearn went on to study Geography and Management at the University of Leeds, graduating in 1999. He was once a pentathlon athlete, but realized that sport was not the highest-paid career choice, and turned to music.

In 1997, Hearn, Harwood, O'Mahony, and Nick Keynes, formed Ultra and released their self-titled debut album in 1999, for which Hearn wrote most of the songs. He left the band and worked as a surveyor before he earned a master's degree from the University of Reading. Ultra reunited in 2005 and released a second album, The Sun Shines Brighter. Hearn subsequently left the music business and now works in wealth management at a London investment bank.
