= Aloke =

ALOKE
- ALOKE in 2006; Left to right: Paul DeCourcey, Christian Zucconi and Alex Charpentier

Background information
- Also known as: The Ham Fam (2009)
- Origin: Ossining, New York
- Genres: Post-hardcore, alternative rock, indie rock, post-grunge
- Years active: 2004–2009; 2015–present
- Labels: Past: Pretty Activity, Gatehouse Anchor; Currently: The End Records
- Spinoffs: Grouplove
- Members: Christian Zucconi; Paul DeCourcey; Alex Charpentier; Alex Walker
- Past members: Anthony Kapfer

ALOKE (Note: According to Zucconi, "aloke" means "invisible".) is an American post-hardcore band that was formed by Christian Zucconi, Paul DeCourcey and Alex Charpentier in Ossining, New York, in 2004. During their career, the band released one live album and three EPs, before disbanding in the summer of 2009. Thereafter, Zucconi formed Grouplove, which gained popularity with ALOKE song, "Colors You Have" (renamed "Colours"). At one time, ALOKE was described as "shoveling out creepy, loud, grueling beauty" and "the fiercest, hardest working, loudest band in NYC".

== History ==
=== Background ===
The founders of the band – Christian Zucconi, Paul DeCourcey and Alex Charpentier – grew up in Westchester County, New York and played together in a school band. Prior to ALOKE, Christian played bass in Pagoda, fronted by his friend and actor Michael Pitt. During his time in Pagoda, Zucconi filmed a music video for their "Happy Song", which captures him as a band member. Zucconi also played additional guitar on "Death to Birth" from Pagoda self-titled debut album. Later on, ALOKE opened several times for Pagoda. Paul DeCourcey played in punk rock band The Skizmatics. Their only record, "No Heroes" EP, was released on Beer City Records in 1996. Alex Charpentier was a drummer for hardcore punk band Awkward Thought. After they were joined by Alex Walker, the future ALOKE guitarist, the band recorded and released "Fear Not" EP. They were soon joined by DeCourcey, and afterwards this line-up recorded the infamous studio album "Ruin a Good Time", which was released on March 25, 2003.

=== Formation and first releases (2004–07) ===
…Pulsating rhythms, catchy guitar and punk influences make ALOKE… The young band members were full of energy and played a thrashing set of screaming vocals on top of a dark and murky rhythm. A voyage into space and beyond, very futuristic, reminding me of a mix of images from The Matrix and Alien. Sci-fi, but thrilling mixed with gothic. What a great show…

— Review of ALOKE concert at Pianos on October 21, 2004

The band was formed as a trio in the summer of 2004 and played its first shows in such venues as Rothko and Pianos. After a while, they released self-titled extended play, which included five songs. Crusher Magazine wrote that songs are "sounds like [they] could've been lifted from the Nirvana box set", while The Deli Magazine reviewer stated that EP "showcase a talented post-punk/post-rock combo with some interesting influences blessed by good songwriting skills and a genetic tendency to avoid banality and… explode!". Both magazines noted the opening track "You Did It… Again", which "evokes the angular stance of post-hardcore" and "will help you regain self-esteem".

On January 29, 2005, the band released their second EP titled "Not So Nonsense". One of the songs from the album, "Fire in the Stove", was later re-recorded by Zucconi as an instrumental, while writing score for Jennifer Venditti documentary Billy the Kid. A few months later, in August, they put out another self-release, live album "One Day We Will Kill You", which was recorded in front of small audience and mixed at Excello Recording Studios by Hugh Pool in April 2005. The entire album also was allowed to download for free on official site.

We're all about playing live, so we wanted to bring that energy to the table when it came to recording.

— Zucconi

The following year, on May 2, the album was released on Pretty Activity and Gatehouse Anchor on CD and vinyl, respectively. Vinyl version, unlike CD, does not include tracks "Love Is Distance" and "All That Ever Was". While promoting the album, ALOKE released three music videos for the songs "Nameless", "Pennywhistle" and "Dirty". The thought process for filming the video for digital single "Nameless" was that the band "wanted it to look and feel like how our live shows are […] sweaty, cathartic and lots of energy". "Pennywhistle" was partly filmed in the deserts of California, while "Dirty" was completely done in the band's rehearsal space.

=== Alex Walker and new recordings (2007–08) ===
Alex Walker grew up with the rest of the band members and prior to joining ALOKE, he had already played with DeCourcey and Charpentier in Awkward Thought. Besides that, Walker played in avant-garde chamber group Electric Kompany and Do Shadows Savage?, which had previously opened for ALOKE on a few occasions. Walker joined the band mid–summer 2007, and after that, the quartet rode to Chicago, Illinois, to record a new album. Recording sessions took place in Electrical Audio Studios and was produced by famed Steve Albini, who has worked with musical acts such as Nirvana, Pixies and PJ Harvey, among many others.

For two weeks we locked ourselves in his studio and worked very closely with him. With him having recorded some of my favorite records of all time, it was just an amazing experience to share with him our songs, and to see how he captured it.

— Walker

Overall, the band recorded 18 songs, 13 of which was scheduled for release on the new album, "What a Sight It Shines at Night". But, instead of a full-length album another EP was released, "I Moved Here to Live", which included five recorded with Albini songs. Hannah Hooper, Zucconi's girlfriend with whom he later formed Grouplove, made the cover artwork for that EP.

Over the next year and a half ALOKE toured frequently and took a part in such events as SXSW and Safe to Swim Weekend.

=== Charpentier's departure, Anthony Kapfer, and break-up (2008–09) ===
In mid 2008, Alex Charpentier left ALOKE to pursue his dream of becoming the understudy for Dr. Frank N. Furter and the remaining band members continued performing as a trio, with Walker temporarily switching to bass, while DeCourcey took control on drums. In the first months of 2009, Anthony Kapfer joined the band and sat behind the drum set. Two weeks after Kapfer auditioned for the band, they played SXSW in Austin, Texas. In May the new line-up was set to record another extended play with Matt Labozza producing it. Although, it was not meant to be: a month later the band played its last show and disbanded, while all that was recorded remained unreleased.

After break-up, Christian Zucconi formed Grouplove. Grouplove adopted some of the ALOKE songs, "approached from a whole new angle", including "Gold Coast", "Itchin' on a Photograph", and "Colors You Have" (renamed "Colours"). The band released two studio albums, Never Trust a Happy Song in 2011, and its follow-up Spreading Rumours in 2013. Besides that, Zucconi participated in side-projects, such as Back Off Track and solo-project Little Million. Paul DeCourcey played for a while with Zucconi in Back Off Track and thereafter decided to focus his musical career on honing his craft as a Luthier and designing and crafting hand-made guitars. Since then, he opened up "Division Street Guitars", a shop in Peekskill, NY, where he repairs and builds custom guitars. Alex Charpentier, after his departure from ALOKE, played some time in Star Fucking Hipsters. In 2011, Walker, along with Charpentier and Jake Siegler, formed FORE, which released a self-titled instrumental album, putting it for free on Bandcamp. The same year, Walker served as touring bassist for Los Angeles-based indie rock band Family of the Year. On April 9, 2012, Walker released an extended play under the pseudonym Tutti Mondi, taken after the FORE song. In 2013, Walker played guitar on Galaxy of Tar EP entitled "Barreta" and Harry and the Henderson's EP entitled "Grooming the Bone". Anthony Kapfer began performing stand up comedy. He has appeared on NBC's Seeso show The Comedy Show Show, and on the Fox show Laughs. In 2011, he released and album of morbid kids songs for adults called Songs For Children To Cry To. In 2015, he released the first ever all animated stand-up comedy special called Anthony Kapfer: The Animated Stand-Up Comedy Special. He also released a book called Book: The Book, in 2016. All of these releases are available at Anthony Kapfer.com.

=== Reunion (2015–present) ===
In April 2015, it was announced that the band will reunite and release a full-length album, containing songs that were recorded back in 2007 at Electrical Audio Studio, Chicago, Illinois, by the producer Steve Albini. The next month, an extended play ALIVE was released, which contained three songs from the upcoming album. On June 3, ALOKE played their first concert since the break-up, which took place at the Boot & Saddle, Philadelphia, Pennsylvania, and one more the next day at Baby's All Right, Brooklyn, New York. New album was released on July 17, having the same name as the EP On the day of its release, the band played a show at Echoplex, Los Angeles, California. Set lists for the above concerts also included unreleased songs, including "Flushot" and "Walk Right Into the Sun".

On June 22, 2017, ALOKE played one-off concert at the Satellite, Los Angeles, California.

== Band members ==
=== Current members ===
- Christian Zucconi – guitar, lead vocals (2004–2009, 2015–present)
- Alex Walker – guitar, vocals (2007–2009, 2015–present)
- Paul DeCourcey – bass, vocals (2004–2009, 2015–present)
- Alex Charpentier – drums (2004–2008, 2015–present)

=== Past members ===
- Anthony Kapfer – drums (2009)

== Discography ==
Extended plays

- ALOKE (2004)
- Not So Nonsense (2005)
- War Child (Promo 2007)
- I Moved Here to Live (2008)
- ALIVE (2015)

Studio albums

- Alive (2015)

Live albums

- One Day We Will Kill You (2006)

Non-album songs

- "It's Been a While"
- "Mikey's Song"
- "Walk Right Into the Sun"
- "Flushot"
- "Creepster"
- "Laughing and Crying"
- "On the Backs of Whales"
- "Rocks in My Head"
- "Run Around Town"
- "As Far As We Go"
- "Colors You Have"
- "Immigrant Son"
- "Head Inside a Suitcase"
- "A Taste of Hootenanny"
- "I Don't Wanna Go Home"
- "Gimme Some Armor"
- "Right Where You Are"
- "Itchin' on a Photograph"
- "Naughty by Nature"
- "All Across the World Today"
