= Just Cause =

Just Cause may refer to:

- Just cause (employment law), a common standard in United States labor arbitration, and a reason for termination of employment.
- Just Cause (film), a 1995 legal thriller starring Sean Connery
- Just Cause (TV series), a 2000s Canadian legal drama
- Just Cause (video game series), a video game series
  - Just Cause (video game), the first entry of the series, released in 2006
- Operation Just Cause, the 1989 U.S. invasion of Panama

== See also ==
- Just war theory, a doctrine of military ethics
- Right Cause (disambiguation)
- Strike for cause, a jury-selection procedure
- Just Because (disambiguation)
