= Just Because (Claire Rosinkranz album) =

Studio album by Claire Rosinkranz
- Released: October 6, 2023
- Genres: Pop; alt-pop; soft pop; indie pop
- Length: 36:39
- Label: Republic
- Producers: Afterhrs; Julian Bunetta; Captain Cuts; Joe Janiak; Paul Meany; Paul Phamous; Elie Rizk; Ragnar Rosinkranz; Stint; Sammy Witte

Singles from Just Because
- 1. "123" Released: July 29, 2022; 2. "Sad in Hawaii" Released: February 3, 2023; 3. "Never Goes Away" Released: March 10, 2023; 4. "Screw Time" Released: July 14, 2023; 5. "Pools and Palm Trees" Released: August 11, 2023; 6. "Wes Anderson" Released: September 8, 2023

Just Because is the debut studio album by American singer-songwriter Claire Rosinkranz. It was released on October 6, 2023 by Republic Records. Rosinkranz enlisted many producers, including AfterHrs, Captain Cuts, Elie Rizk, Paul Meany, Paul Phamous, Stint, and her father, Ragnar Rosinkranz.

== Critical reception ==
Professional ratings
Review scores
Source	Rating
Clash	7/10
The Line of Best Fit	8/10
The Guardian	3/5 stars
Dork	4/5 stars

Just Because received generally positive reviews from critics. It was described by critics as "bright and uplifting sunshine pop" and "energetic". Igor Bannikov of Album of the Year compared the final track, "Mess", to Billie Eilish, and described it as pointing to a more "mature" and "serious" side in future music.

== Track listing ==
Just Because track listing
No.	Title	Writer(s)	Producer(s)	Length
1.	"123"	Claire Rosinkranz; Ben Berger; Hayley Gene Penner; Ryan Rabin; Andrew Wessen	Captain Cuts	2:17
2.	"Sad in Hawaii"	C. Rosinkranz; Ian Franzino; Andrew Haas; Ragnar Rosinkranz; Paul Shelton	Afterhrs; Paul Phamous	2:31
3.	"Never Goes Away"	C. Rosinkranz; Elie Rizk	Rizk	2:26
4.	"Dreamer"	C. Rosinkranz; Casey Smith; Sammy Witte	Witte	2:28
5.	"Swinging at the Stars"	C. Rosinkranz; Joe Janiak; Simon Wilcox	Janiak	3:43
6.	"Screw Time"	C. Rosinkranz; Caroline Ailin; Ajay Bhattacharyya	Stint	3:05
7.	"Gum"	C. Rosinkranz; Berger; Rabin; Shelton	Captain Cuts; Paul Phamous	2:13
8.	"Wes Anderson"	C. Rosinkranz; Franzino; Haas; R. Rosinkranz; Shelton	Afterhrs; Paul Phamous	2:47
9.	"Banksy"	C. Rosinkranz; Franzino; Haas; R. Rosinikranz; Shelton	Afterhrs; Paul Phamous	2:54
10.	"Polarized"	C. Rosinkranz; Julian Bunetta; R. Rosinkranz; Savana Santos; Shelton	Afterhrs; Paul Phamous; Bunetta; R. Rosinkranz^{[c]}	3:02
11.	"Jupiter"	C. Rosinkranz; Franzino; Haas; R. Rosinkranz; Shelton	Afterhrs; Paul Phamous; R. Rosinkranz^{[c]}	3:32
12.	"Pools and Palm Trees"	C. Rosinkranz; Paul Meany; Shelton	Paul Phamous; Meany	3:06
13.	"Mess"	C. Rosinkranz; Franzino; Haas; R. Rosinkranz	Afterhrs; R. Rosinkranz	2:32
Total length:				36:39

=== Note ===
- ^{^[c]} indicates a co-producer

== Personnel ==
Credits adapted from Tidal.

- Claire Rosinkranz – vocals (all tracks), guitar (tracks 2, 12), background vocals (11), ukulele (13)
- John Greenham – mastering
- Tess Greenham – mastering assistance
- Ben Berger – background vocals, bass, drums, programming, engineering (1, 7); guitar, keyboards (7)
- Ryan Rabin – background vocals, bass, drums, programming, engineering (1, 7); guitar, keyboards (7)
- Hayley Gene Penner – background vocals (1)
- Andrew Wessen – guitar (1)
- Pedro Calloni – mixing (1)
- Michael Freeman – mixing (2–13)
- Ragnar Rosinkranz – bass (2, 4, 12, 13), guitar (2, 8, 10, 13), viola (8–11, 13), strings (8–11), additional vocals (8); cello, violin (9–11, 13); string arrangement (9–11), keyboards (10, 11, 13); organ, programming, engineering (13)
- Andrew Haas – keyboards, engineering (2, 8–11, 13); bass, drums, programming (2, 8–11); ukulele (2), background vocals (11)
- Ian Franzino – drums, programming, engineering (2, 8–11); background vocals (11)
- Elie Rizk – bass, drums, guitar, keyboards, engineering (3)
- Sammy Witte – drums, guitar, keyboards, programming, engineering (4)
- Joe Janiak – bass, drums, guitar, keyboards, programming, engineering (5)
- Ajay Bhattacharyya – bass, drums, guitar, keyboards, engineering (6)
- Anthony Dolhai – engineering (6)
- Jeff Gunnell – engineering assistance (7–11)
- Paul Phamous – background vocals (7, 8, 10, 11), additional vocals (9)
- Julian Bunetta – bass, drums, guitar, keyboards, programming, engineering (10)
- Savana Santos – drums, programming, engineering (10)
- Paul Meany – drums, keyboards, engineering (12)
