= Colours (Grouplove song) =

2011 single by Grouplove

Single by Grouplove

from the album Never Trust a Happy Song and the EP Grouplove
- Released: July 7, 2011
- Recorded: 2010
- Genre: Alternative rock
- Length: 4:14
- Label: Canvasback; Atlantic
- Songwriters: Hannah Hooper: Chris Zucconi; Sean Gadd; Ryan Rabin
- Producer: Ryan Rabin

Grouplove singles chronology
"Colours" (2011)	"Tongue Tied" (2011)

"Colours" is a song by American indie rock band Grouplove. It is the fourth track from their debut album, Never Trust a Happy Song, and also appeared on their self-titled debut EP. The song was the first single released from the album, on July 7, 2011, with a music video. The song was produced by Ryan Rabin.

Foster the People released a remix of the song via RCRD LBL in 2011. The song is featured on the soundtrack of Madden NFL 12. A remix of the song by Captain Cuts is on the soundtrack of FIFA 12.

== Music video ==
The music video for "Colours" was released on January 4, 2011. It shows the lead singer, Christian Zucconi, being hanged from a tree before the other band members attack, dressed as Native Americans.

== Track listing ==
7" vinyl
No.	Title	Length
1.	"Colours"	4:14
2.	"Colours (Captain Cuts Remix)"	4:32

== Charts ==
Chart (2011)	Peak position
Canada Rock (Billboard)	50
US Hot Rock & Alternative Songs (Billboard)	29
