= Just Because =

Just Because may refer to:

== Albums ==
- Just Because, by the Peninsula Banjo Band, 1976
- Just Because (The Belle Brigade album), 2014
- Just Because (Claire Rosinkranz album), 2023

== Songs ==
- "Just Because" (Ginuwine song), 2001
- "Just Because" (Jane's Addiction song), 2003
- "Just Because" (Nelstone's Hawaiians song), 1929; covered by Frankie Yankovic, Elvis Presley, and others
- "Just Because", by Anita Baker from Giving You the Best That I Got
- "Just Because", by Baek A-yeon
- "Just Because", by Chad Brownlee from The Fighters
- "Just Because", by Dido from Still on My Mind
- "Just Because", by F.A.T.E. from the Deep Blue Sea soundtrack album
- "Just Because", by Funeral Party from The Golden Age of Knowhere
- "Just Because", by Joyner Lucas from 508-507-2209
- "Just Because", by Lloyd Price, 1956
- "Just Because", by Ray Charles, from Ain't It So, 1979
- "Just Because", by War from Outlaw

== Other uses ==
- Just Because!, a 2017 Japanese anime television series
- Just Because (musical), a 1922 American musical
- Just Because, a 2014 concert tour by Trisha Yearwood
- Just Because, Inc., former owner of radio station WQVR in Massachusetts, US

== See also ==
- Just Cause (disambiguation)
