= Big Mess =

Big Mess may refer to:

- Big Mess (Danny Elfman album), 2021
- Big Mess (Grouplove album), 2016
- "Big Mess", song by Devo from the 1982 album Oh, No! It's Devo
