= Captain Cuts =

Los Angeles-based music team

- Origin: Los Angeles, California, US
- Occupations: Record producers; songwriters; remixers
- Years active: 2011–present
- Label: Epic
- Members: Ben Berger; Ryan Rabin
- Past members: Ryan McMahon
- Website: captaincutsmusic.com

Captain Cuts is a songwriting, record production and remix team based in Los Angeles. The duo is composed of Ben Berger and Ryan Rabin (also formerly drummer and producer of the band Grouplove), but they also included Ryan McMahon. Collectively they have produced and co-written songs for artists such as Walk the Moon ("Shut Up and Dance"), Bebe Rexha ("I Got You"), Halsey, The Chainsmokers, Grouplove, Tove Lo, LÉON, Keith Urban, and Marina, amongst others.

In December 2013, they signed a joint venture deal with Warner Bros Records to form Cuts Records, a record label through which to sign, produce and develop new artists.

In 2016, they signed a record deal with Epic Records as artists and released their first single "Love Like We Used To" in October of that year.

== Background and career ==
Berger and Rabin grew up in Los Angeles, going to the same high school and involved in the music scene. They first wrote together several years later, and when their creative dynamic felt natural after the first song, they continued working together, eventually forming Captain Cuts and becoming long-term collaborators. They released the mixtape If You’re Listening It's Never Too Late in 2015. Captain Cuts began performing DJ sets on a recurring basis at Emo Nite LA in 2016.

The team was a featured artist on the 2018 NOTD and Felix Jaehn single "So Close", with a music video starring Sports Illustrated Swimsuit cover girl Camille Kostek.

== Discography ==
=== Singles ===
==== As lead artist ====
- "Love Like We Used To" (2016) (featuring Nateur)
- "Cocaina" (2017) (featuring Rich the Kid and Daniels)
- "House Party" (2017) (with The Knocks)
- "Do You Think About Me" (2018) (with Zookeper featuring Georgia Ku)
- "Summertime Love" (2019) (with Digital Farm Animals)
- "Heat" (2019) (featuring Parson James)
- "Stuck in My Head" (2020) (featuring AJ Mitchell)

==== As featured artist ====
- "So Close" (2018) (NOTD and Felix Jaehn featuring Captain Cuts and Georgia Ku)
- "On Air" (2022) What So Not featuring Louis the Child, Captain Cuts and JRM

=== Singles ===
List of singles written or produced by Captain Cuts, with selected chart positions, year released and certifications.
Year	Title	Peak chart positions												Certifications
Year	Title	US	US Alt	US Pop	US Hot AC	US Rock	US Dance	US Dance Club	AUS	CAN	NZ	SWE	UK	Certifications
2011	"Colours" (Grouplove)	—	15	—	—	29	—	—	—	—	—	—	—	RIAA: Gold
2011	"Tongue Tied" (Grouplove)	42	1	21	18	3	—	—	33	90	—	—	84	RIAA: Platinum; ARIA: Gold; MC: Gold
2012	"Itchin' on a Photograph" (Grouplove)	—	10	—	—	30	—	—	—	—	—	—	—	
2013	"To the End of the Earth" (Jessica Mauboy)	—	—	—	—	—	—	—	21	—	—	—	—	ARIA: Gold
2013	"Ways to Go" (Grouplove)	120	2	—	—	18	—	—	60	—	—	—	—	RIAA: Gold
2013	"Shark Attack" (Grouplove)	—	20	—	—	—	—	—	—	—	—	—	—	
2014	"Dreaming" (Smallpools)	—	23	—	—	45	—	—	—	—	—	—	—	RIAA: Gold
2014	"Different Kind of Love" (Third Degree)	—	—	—	—	—	—	—	22	—	—	—	—	
2015	"Shut Up and Dance" (Walk the Moon)	4	1	2	1	1	—	—	3	4	11	12	4	RIAA: 3× Platinum; ARIA: 6× Platinum; MC: 7× Platinum; BPI: 3× Platinum; GLF: 4× Platinum; RMNZ: Platinum; BVMI: Platinum
2016	"Welcome to Your Life" (Grouplove)	—	5	—	—	—	—	—	—	—	—	—	—	
2016	"What We Live For" (American Authors)	—	—	—	24	40	—	—	—	—	—	—	—	
2016	"Love Like We Used To" (Captain Cuts)	—	—	43	—	—	—	—	—	—	—	—	—	
2016	"I Got You" (Bebe Rexha)	43	—	17	—	—	—	1	73	38	—	29	91	RIAA: Platinum; MC: Gold; ARIA: Platinum; FIMI: Gold; SNEP: Gold; BPI: Silver
2017	"One Foot" (Walk the Moon)	65	1	21	12	4	—	—	—	—	—	—	—	RIAA: Gold
2018	"Kamikaze" (Walk the Moon)	—	6	—	—	19	—	—	—	—	—	—	—	
2018	"Be Somebody" (Steve Aoki & Nicky Romero ft. Kiiara)	—	—	—	—	—	30	—	—	—	—	—	—	
2018	"Party for One" (Carly Rae Jepsen)	—	—	—	—	—	—	—	—	100	19	—	—	
2018	"So Close" (NOTD and Felix Jaehn featuring Captain Cuts and Georgia Ku)	—	—	27	—	—	10	1	45	—	31	77	—	RIAA: Platinum; ARIA: 2× Platinum; MC: Gold
2019	"Kissing Other People" (Lennon Stella)	—	—	—	—	—	—	—	—	60	—	—	—	
2019	"Go Easy" (Matt Maeson)	—	15	—	—	24	—	—	—	—	—	—	—	
2020	"Sad Tonight" (Chelsea Cutler)	—	—	32	—	—	—	—	—	—	—	—	—	
2020	"Superman" (Keith Urban)	—	—	—	—	—	—	—	—	— (Note: "Superman" did not enter the Billboard Canadian Hot 100, but peaked at number 16 on the Hot Canadian Digital Song Sales chart.)	—	—	—	

=== Full discography ===
Year	Artist	Album	Details
2011	Grouplove	Never Trust a Happy Song	Producer, co-writer, co-mixer ("Itchin' on a Photograph", "Tongue Tied", "Lovely Cup", "Colours", "Slow", "Naked Kids", "Spun", "Betty's a Bomb Shell", "Chloe", "Love Will Save Your Soul", "Cruel and Beautiful World", "Close Your Eyes and Count to Ten")
2012	The Knocks	The Feeling (single)	Co-writer, additional production ("The Feeling")
2012	Marina and the Diamonds	Electra Heart	Producer, co-writer ("Lonely Hearts Club")
2013	Eddie Gomez	No	Producer, co-writer, mixer ("Someday", "Figure It Out", "Backseat", "Monsters", "Little Bit Of Candy", "I Want You")
2013	Grouplove	Spreading Rumours	Producer, co-writer, co-mixer ("I'm With You", "Borderlines and Aliens", "Schoolboy", "Ways to Go", "Shark Attack", "Sit Still", "Hippy Hill", "What I Know", "Didn't Have to Go", "Bitin' the Bullet", "News to Me", "Raspberry", "Save the Party", "Girl", "Flowers", "Beans on Pizza")
2013	Jessica Mauboy	Beautiful	Producer, co-writer ("To the End of the Earth")
2013	Grouplove & Manchester Orchestra	Make It to Me (single)	Producer, co-writer ("Make It to Me")
2013	The Mowgli's	Waiting for the Dawn	Producer, co-writer ("Clean Light")
2014	Tegan and Sara	Endless Love (soundtrack)	Producer, mixer ("Don't Find Another Love")
2014	Strange Talk	Cast Away	Producer, co-writer ("Young Hearts")
2014	Third Degree	Different Kind of Love (single)	Producer, co-writer, mixer ("Different Kind of Love")
2014	Walk the Moon	Talking Is Hard	Co-writer ("Shut Up and Dance"), Co-producer, co-writer ("Up 2 U")
2014	Tove Lo	Queen of the Clouds	Producer, co-writer ("Crave")
2015	Smallpools	Lovetap!	Producer, co-writer ("American Love", "Killer Whales", "Dreaming", "Street Fight", "Mason Jar", "Over & Over", "Lovetap!", "What's That a Picture Of?", "Dyin' to Live", "Admission to Your Party", "9 To 5", "No Story Time", "Submarine")
2015	The Mowgli's	Kids in Love	Producer, co-writer ("I'm Good", "Through the Dark", "Bad Dream")
2015	Fancy Reagan	Knock Me Out (single)	Producer, co-writer ("Knock Me Out")
2015	Say Lou Lou	Lucid Dreaming	Co-writer ("Angels Above Me")
2015	Sabrina Carpenter	Eyes Wide Open	Producer, co-writer, mixer ("Two Young Hearts")
2015	Tigertown	Papernote (single)	Producer, co-writer, mixer ("Papernote")
2015	Waters	What's Real	Producer, co-writer, mixer ("Got to My Head", "I Feel Everything", "The Avenue", "What's Real", "Breakdown", "Over It")
2015	Lucas Nord	Voices (single)	Co-writer ("Voices")
2015	R5	Sometime Last Night	Producer, co-writer ("All Night")
2015	Halsey	Badlands	Producer, co-writer ("Roman Holiday")
2015	The Score	Where Do You Run	Producer, co-writer ("Something New"), Additional production ("Livin' Right")
2015	Third Eye Blind	Dopamine	Producer ("Rites of Passage")
2015	Us the Duo	Slow Down Time (single)	Producer, co-writer ("Slow Down Time")
2016	Cardiknox	Portrait	Co-producer, co-writer ("Into the Night")
2016	St. Lucia	Matter	Co-producer, co-writer ("Physical", "Game 4 U")
2016	American Authors	What We Live For	Producer, co-writer ("What We Live For", "Right Here Right Now")
2016	Broods	Conscious	Producer, co-writer ("Are You Home")
2016	The Knocks	55	Vocal producer ("Kiss the Sky")
2016	Grouplove	Big Mess	Producer, co-writer (“Welcome to Your Life”, “Do You Love Someone”, ”Standing in the Sun”, “Enlighten Me”, “Good Morning”, “Spinning”, “Cannonball”, “Traumatized”, “Heart of Mine”, “Don't Stop Making It Happen”, “Hollywood”)
2016	Captain Cuts ft. Nateur	Love Like We Used To (single)	Producer, co-writer, artist ("Love Like We Used To")
2017	Bebe Rexha	All Your Fault Pt. 1	Producer, co-writer ("I Got You", "F.F.F. ft. G-Eazy")
2017	SoMo	The Answers	Producer, co-writer ("Over")
2017	Audien ft. MAX	One More Weekend (single)	Co-producer, co-writer ("One More Weekend")
2017	The Chainsmokers	Memories...Do Not Open	Co-producer, co-writer ("Break Up Every Night")
2017	Captain Cuts ft. Rich The Kid & Daniels	Cocaina (single)	Producer, co-writer, artist ("Cocaina")
2017	Neon Trees	Feel Good (single)	Producer ("Feel Good")
2017	Walk the Moon	What If Nothing	Co-producer, co-writer ("One Foot", "Surrender", "Kamikaze")
2017	Rozes	Famous (single)	Producer, co-writer ("Famous")
2017	The Knocks & Captain Cuts	House Party (single)	Producer, co-writer, artist ("House Party")
2018	The Night Game	Bad Girls Don't Cry (single)	Co-writer ("Bad Girls Don't Cry")
2018	What So Not	Beautiful (single)	Co-writer, vocal producer ("Beautiful")
2018	Amy Shark, Julia Michaels	Love, Simon (soundtrack)	Co-producer, co-writer ("Sink In")
2018	Keith Urban	Graffiti U	Co-producer, co-writer ("Love The Way It Hurts (So Good)")
2018	TOMI	Coming Around (single)	Producer, co-writer ("Coming Around")
2018	Half The Animal	Too Late (single)	Producer, co-writer ("Too Late")
2018	The Vamps	Night & Day	Producer, co-writer ("What Your Father Says")
2018	lovelytheband	Finding It Hard To Smile	Co-writer ("Your Whatever")
2018	Captain Cuts & Zookëper ft. Georgia Ku	Do You Think About Me? (single)	Co-producer, co-writer, artist ("Do You Think About Me?")
2018	Half The Animal	Magic (single)	Producer, co-writer ("Magic")
2018	Steve Aoki & Nicky Romero ft. Kiiara	Be Somebody (single)	Co-producer, co-writer, ("Be Somebody")
2018	Allie X	Little Things (single)	Co-producer, co-writer ("Little Things")
2018	Léon	Baby Don't talk (single)	Producer, co-writer ("Baby Don't Talk")
2018	Nightly	Who Am I To You (single)	Co-producer, co-writer ("Who Am I To You")
2018	NOTD, Felix Jaehn & Captain Cuts ft. Georgia Ku	So Close (single)	Co-producer, co-writer, artist ("So Close")
2018	Carly Rae Jepsen	Party For One (single)	Co-producer ("Party For One")
2018	Whethan ft. Bipolar Sunshine	Life Of A Wallflower Vol. 1	Co-producer, co-writer ("Top Shelf")
2018	Loren Gray	Queen (single)	Producer, co-writer ("Queen")
2019	Carly Rae Jepsen	Now That I Found You (single)	Producer, Co-writer ("Now That I Found You")
2019	Marina	Love + Fear	Co-producer, co-writer ("Superstar", "Karma")
2019	Léon	Léon	Producer, co-writer ("Better In The Dark")
2019	Justin Jesso, Nina Nesbitt	Let It Be Me (EP)	Co-producer, co-writer ("Let it Be Me")
2019	Dreamers	Launch Fly Land	Co-producer, co-writer ("Someway, Somehow")
2019	Matt Maeson	Bank On The Funeral	Co-producer, co-writer ("Go Easy", "Tread On Me")
2019	Loren Gray	Options/Lie Like That	Producer, co-writer ("Options", "Lie Like That")
2019	Jai Wolf	The Cure To Loneliness	Co-writer ("Still Sleeping")
2019	The Head and The Heart	Living Mirage	Producer, co-writer ("Up Against the Wall")
2019	Georgia Ku	What Do I Do? (single)	Co-writer ("What Do I Do?")
2019	Blink-182	Generational Divide (single)	Co-writer ("Generational Divide")
2019	Captain Cuts, Digital Farm Animals	Summertime Love (single)	Co-producer, co-writer, artist ("Summertime Love")
2019	Lennon Stella	Kissing Other People (single)	Co-producer, co-writer ("Kissing Other People")
2019	Captain Cuts ft. Parson James	Heat (single)	Co-producer, co-writer, artist ("Heat")
2019	Bearson ft. JRM & Georgia Ku	All In (single)	Co-producer, co-writer ("All In")
2020	Chelsea Cutler	How To Be Human	Producer, co-writer ("Sad Tonight")
2020	Marina	To All The Boys: P.S. I Still Love You	Producer, co-writer ("About Love")
2020	Conan Gray	Kid Krow	Producer, co-writer ("Little League")
2020	Lennon Stella	Three. Two. One.	Co-producer, co-writer ("Kissing Other People", "Older Than I Am")
2020	Matoma & Captain Cuts ft. Georgia Ku	RYTME	Co-producer, co-writer, artist ("Beside You")
2020	Kygo with Jamie N Commons	Golden Hour	Co-writer ("Feels Like Forever")
2020	Walk Off The Earth	Oh What A Feeling (single)	Co-producer, co-writer ("Oh What A Feeling")
2020	DAHL	After Ours (single)	Producer, co-writer ("After Ours")
2020	Keith Urban	The Speed of Now Part 1	Co-producer, co-writer ("Superman")
2020	Cash Cash ft. Georgia Ku	Love You Now (single)	Co-writer ("Love You Now")
2020	Loote, Travis Barker, Captain Cuts	Sex With My Ex (single)	Co-producer, co-writer ("Sex With My Ex")
2020	Georgia Ku	What Do I Do? (single)	Co-producer, co-writer ("What Do I Do?")
2020	Captain Cuts ft. AJ Mitchell	Stuck In My Head (single)	Producer, co-writer, artist ("Stuck In My Head")
2021	Sabrina Carpenter	Skin (single)	Producer, co-writer ("Skin")
2021	Nora Van Elken & Clara Mae	Way Out (single)	Producer, co-writer ("Way Out")
2021	John K	in case you miss me	Co-producer, co-writer ("magic", "don't")
2021	Urban Cone	Never Enough (single)	Co-producer, co-writer ("Never Enough")
2021	Felix Jaehn, Robin Shulz ft. Georgia Ku	I Got A Feeling (single)	Co-producer, co-writer ("I Got A Feeling")
2021	Monsta X	The Dreaming	Producer, co-writer ("Secrets")
2021	Walk The Moon	Heights (album)	Co-Producer, co-writer ("DNA (The Keys)")
2021	Grouplove	This Is This	Co-writer ("Seagulls")
2021	Beren Olivia ft. Lostboycrow	History (single)	Co-writer ("History")
2022	Nikko + Sway ft. JRM	Save Me (single)	Co-producer, co-writer ("Save Me")
2022	Lexi Jayde	closure to closure	Producer, Co-writer ("cruel intentions")
2022	Ofenbach (DJs)	4U (single)	Co-producer, co-writer ("4U")
2022	Bryce Vine	Nobody (single)	Producer, co-writer ("Nobody")
2022	Leah Kate	Twinkle Twinkle Little Bitch (single)	Co-producer, co-writer ("Twinkle Twinkle Little Bitch")
2022	Aidan Bissett	Twenty Something (single)	Producer, co-writer ("Twenty Something)
2022	Madeline the Person	CHAPTER 3: The Burning	Producer, co-writer ("Not Sorry")
2022	Claire Rosinkranz	123 (single)	Producer, co-writer ("123")
2022	Olivia O'Brien ft. FLETCHER	Bitch Back (single)	Producer, co-writer ("Bitch Back")
2022	Captain Cuts, What So Not, Louis The Child & JRM	On Air (single)	Co-writer, co-producer, performer ("On Air")
2022	Captain Cuts, Mahalo & Dan Caplen	Are U With Me (single)	Co-writer, co-producer, performer ("Are U With Me")
2022	Aidan Bissett	Tripping Over Air (single)	Co-writer, producer ("Tripping Over Air")
2022	Carly Rae Jepsen	Talking to Yourself (single)	Co-writer, producer ("Talking to Yourself")
2022	JAWNY	wide eyed (single)	Co-writer, co-producer ("wide eyed")
2022	UPSAHL	"Kickflip"	Co-writer, producer ("Kickflip")
2022	UPSAHL	"Skin Crawl"	Co-writer, producer ("Skin Crawl")
2023	Måneskin	"OWN MY MIND"	Co-writer ("OWN MY MIND")
2023	JAWNY	"giving up on you"	Co-writer, co-producer ("giving up on you")
2023	Aidan Bissett	"Out Of My League"	Co-writer, producer ("Out Of My League")
2023	Aidan Bissett	"Sick"	Co-writer, producer ("Sick")
2023	Exbf & Slimdan	"hockey fights"	Co-writer ("hockey fights")
2023	Lexi Jayde	"bandages"	Co-writer, producer ("bandages")
2023	Aidan Bissett	"Ultraviolet"	Co-writer, producer ("Ultraviolet")
2023	Knox	"I'm So Good At Being Alone"	Co-writer, co-producer ("I'm So Good At Being Alone")
2023	Claire Rosinkranz	"Gum"	Co-writer, co-producer ("Gum")
2023	Måneskin	"OFF MY FACE"	Co-writer, co-producer ("OFF MY FACE")
2024	Arden Jones	"Hard Enough To Stay Alive"	Co-writer, Producer ("Hard Enough To Stay Alive")
2024	NOTD, Georgia Ku	"Nostalgia"	Co-writer, Producer ("Nostalgia")
2024	Aidan Bissett	"Planet"	Co-writer, Producer ("Planet")
2024	Audien, Jason Ross	"21"	Co-writer, Producer ("21")
2024	Mahalo, Captain Cuts, Dan Caplen	"Are U With Me"	Co-writer, Producer ("Are U With Me")
2024	Benson Boone	"Fireworks & Rollerblades"	Co-writer, Producer ("There She Goes")
2025	Wonho	"Better Than Me"	Co-writer, Producer
2026	KiiiKiii	"Pop Off Pop Off"	Co-writer, Producer

=== Remixes ===
- Walk the Moon - "One Foot"
- Grouplove – "Colours"
- Icona Pop – "Manners"
- Superhumanoids – "Mirrors" (Captain Cuts & Grouplove Remix)
- Britney Spears – "I Wanna Go"
- Ellie Goulding – "Lights"
- Foster the People – "Pumped Up Kicks" (Captain Cuts & Grouplove Remix)
- Young The Giant – "Apartment"
- Marina and the Diamonds – "Radioactive"
- Outasight – "Tonight Is the Night"
- We Barbarians – "Headspace" (Captain Cuts & Grouplove Remix)
- Imagine Dragons – "Radioactive" (Captain Cuts & Grouplove Remix)
- American Authors – "Believer"
- Icona Pop – "All Night"
- The Wombats – "Your Body Is a Weapon" (Grouplove & Captain Cuts Remix)
- The Rubens – "My Gun" (Grouplove & Captain Cuts Remix)
- Grouplove – "Ways to Go"
- Smallpools – "Mason Jar" (Grouplove & Captain Cuts Remix)
- Gold Fields – "Dark Again" (Captain Cuts & Grouplove Remix)

== Awards and nominations ==
Year	Organization	Nominated work	Award	Result	Ref.
2015	Teen Choice Awards	"Shut Up and Dance"	Choice Music: Party Song	Nominated	
2015	MTV Video Music Awards	"Shut Up and Dance"	Best Rock Video	Nominated	
2016	iHeartRadio Music Awards	"Shut Up and Dance"	Song of the Year	Nominated	
2016	iHeartRadio Music Awards	"Shut Up and Dance"	Alternative Rock Song of the Year	Nominated	
2016	Billboard Music Awards	"Shut Up and Dance"	Top Rock Song	Won	
2016	Billboard Music Awards	"Shut Up and Dance"	Top Radio Song	Won	
2018	CMA Awards	Graffiti U	Album of the Year	Nominated	
2020	iHeartRadio Music Awards	So Close	Dance Song Of The Year	Nominated	
