= Nationals (Glee) =

- Glee episode
- Episode no.: Season 3 Episode 21
- Directed by: Eric Stoltz
- Written by: Ali Adler
- Production code: 3ARC21
- Original air date: May 15, 2012

Guest appearances
- Whoopi Goldberg as Carmen Tibideaux; Jonathan Groff as Jesse St. James; Rex Lee as Martin Fong; Lindsay Lohan as herself; Perez Hilton as himself; Iqbal Theba as Principal Figgins; Dot-Marie Jones as Coach Beiste; Chord Overstreet as Sam Evans; NeNe Leakes as Roz Washington; Alex Newell as Wade "Unique" Adams; Damian McGinty as Rory Flanagan; Samuel Larsen as Joe Hart; Vanessa Lengies as Sugar Motta; Lauren Potter as Becky Jackson; Mary Gillis as Mrs. Hagberg

Episode chronology
| ← Previous "Props" | Next → "Goodbye" |
- Glee season 3

"Nationals" is the twenty-first episode of the third season of the American musical television series Glee, and the sixty-fifth overall. Written by Ali Adler and directed by Eric Stoltz, the episode is the second of two new episodes that aired back-to-back on Fox in the United States on May 15, 2012. It features New Directions facing off against Vocal Adrenaline at the Nationals show choir competition in Chicago, and several special guest stars: Whoopi Goldberg as NYADA dean Carmen Tibideaux, Jonathan Groff as Vocal Adrenaline director Jesse St. James, Lindsay Lohan as herself judging the competition and Rex Lee playing a Chicago alderman who is another of the judges.

The episode received mostly positive reviews, both in general and for the musical performances in particular. While reviewers were not impressed with the judging scene and highly critical of the inclusion of Emma and Will's having sex for the first time as part of the post-victory sequence, the overall quality was lauded by many. The musical numbers were widely praised, and although some critics felt that Vocal Adrenaline gave better performances than New Directions, the three main competition soloists—Rachel (Lea Michele), Finn (Cory Monteith) and Unique (Alex Newell)—were especially singled out for encomiums. However, none of the episode's seven songs charted on the Billboard Hot 100, though two of the New Directions competition songs, Rachel's "It's All Coming Back to Me Now" and the group number featuring Finn and her, "Paradise by the Dashboard Light", did chart on the Billboard Canadian Hot 100.

Upon its initial airing, this episode was viewed by 6.03 million American viewers and received a 2.5/7 Nielsen rating/share in the 18–49 demographic. The total viewership was down slightly from "Props" in the previous hour, and more significantly down from "Prom-asaurus" the week before.

== Plot ==
The New Directions glee club is in Chicago for the national show choir competition, but Mercedes (Amber Riley) is sick in her hotel bed with a bad fever and stomach pains, possibly due to food poisoning. Will (Matthew Morrison) drafts Quinn (Dianna Agron) and Tina (Jenna Ushkowitz) into the Troubletones number to add vocal heft with Mercedes sidelined, and Sue (Jane Lynch) starts medical measures to restore her to health. During final rehearsals, fights break out among the New Directions members, but are easily resolved because the intensity of their focus is on winning.

On the day of the show, Rachel (Lea Michele) is accosted by Jesse St. James (Jonathan Groff), her ex-boyfriend and current director of rival show choir Vocal Adrenaline. Jesse tries to hurt her confidence by bringing up her failed NYADA audition before Carmen Tibideaux (Whoopi Goldberg), but she realizes his intent and that his own uncertainty is showing.

The Nationals judges are introduced: Lindsay Lohan, Perez Hilton, and Chicago alderman Martin Fong (Rex Lee). New Directions is the first group to compete, and Mercedes arrives just in time to go on stage with the group, healthy again thanks to Sue. The Troubletones lead off with "The Edge of Glory". Rachel then performs "It's All Coming Back to Me Now". Carmen arrives during the number, for which Rachel receives a standing ovation. The finale is "Paradise by the Dashboard Light", which also brings the audience to its feet, and gets an approving whistle from Carmen. Later, in the lobby, Jesse approaches Carmen and recommends Rachel for NYADA.

Mercedes and Kurt go to the Vocal Adrenaline dressing room to wish lead singer Wade "Unique" Adams (Alex Newell) good luck, but he tells them that he has chosen not to perform because he can no longer take the pressure of his new celebrity status. Kurt suggests that Unique, Wade's transgender alter ego, might be able to handle what Wade is unable to, and the teen starts to get ready. On stage, Unique and Vocal Adrenaline perform "Starships" and "Pinball Wizard". The judges name Unique the Nationals MVP, but they award the Nationals trophy to New Directions, with Vocal Adrenaline in second place.

Back at McKinley, the glee club members are treated as heroes by the school. Sue is restored as sole coach of the Cheerios, displacing co-coach Roz Washington (NeNe Leakes). At their apartment, Emma (Jayma Mays) and Will have sex for the first time. Principal Figgins (Iqbal Theba) arranges with Finn and Rachel for New Directions to perform the next night at the Teacher of the Year ceremony, which is won by Will. The group congratulates Will and performs "We Are the Champions".

== Production ==
The episode was written by co-executive producer Ali Adler and directed by Eric Stoltz. Shooting of the episode had begun by April 18, 2012, and continued at least through April 27, 2012; the final episode of the season began filming the following Monday, April 30, 2012.

The final day of shooting the Nationals competition scenes, April 26, 2012, was also the day that the show celebrated filming its 400th musical performance.

The New Directions portion of the competition includes three songs: Lady Gaga's "The Edge of Glory" performed by the Troubletones, Celine Dion's "It's All Coming Back to Me Now" sung by Michele, and a group performance of Meat Loaf's "Paradise by the Dashboard Light" with Monteith and Michele as primary leads. These three songs were released as singles for digital download, along with an additional four from the episode: Nicki Minaj's "Starships" and The Who's "Pinball Wizard", both performed by Newell with Vocal Adrenaline, as well as Queen's "We Are the Champions" performed by New Directions featuring Monteith, Michele, Agron, Colfer, Naya Rivera and Mark Salling, and Grouplove's "Tongue Tied", also by New Directions. "The Edge of Glory" and "We Are the Champions" are also featured on the soundtrack album Glee: The Music, The Graduation Album, with the former song retitled "Edge of Glory" in both single and album releases.

Special guest stars include Goldberg as NYADA dean Carmen Tibideaux, Groff as Vocal Adrenaline director Jesse St. James, and actress Lindsay Lohan and gossip columnist Perez Hilton as themselves, in the role of celebrity judges for the competition. Rex Lee plays Alderman Martin Fong, another judge.

Recurring guest stars appearing in the episode include glee club members Sam Evans (Chord Overstreet), Rory Flanagan (Damian McGinty), Joe Hart (Samuel Larsen) and Sugar Motta (Vanessa Lengies), Principal Figgins (Theba), football coach Shannon Beiste (Dot-Marie Jones), cheerleader Becky Jackson (Lauren Potter), synchronized swimming coach Roz Washington (Leakes), retiring teacher Mrs. Hagberg (Mary Gillis) and Vocal Adrenaline transgender lead vocalist Wade "Unique" Adams (Newell).

== Reception ==
=== Ratings ===
"Nationals" was first broadcast on May 15, 2012 in the United States on Fox, as the second hour in a two-hour special evening with "Props" having aired in the first hour at the show's regular broadcast time. It received a 2.5/7 Nielsen rating/share in the 18–49 demographic, and attracted 6.03 million American viewers during its initial broadcast, slightly lower than the 2.5/8 rating/share and 6.09 million viewers during "Props" in the hour before, but a significant decrease from the 2.7/8 rating/share and 6.67 million viewers of the previous week's episode, "Prom-asaurus", which was broadcast on May 8, 2012.

In Canada, which also aired the episode as the second hour of a two-episode special on the same day as its American premiere, viewership rose significantly, by over 16% to 1.56 million viewers from the 1.34 million viewers for the first hour. "Nationals" was the tenth most-viewed show of the week as compared to "Props", which had been fourteenth most-viewed. "Nationals" viewership was still down by over 5% from the 1.65 million viewers who watched "Prom-asaurus" the week before.

Although the United Kingdom also aired these two episodes together, "Nationals" aired in the show's regular time slot, while "Props" aired an hour earlier than usual. Viewership fell in the second hour, though it remained higher than the previous week. "Nationals" first aired on May 17, 2012, and was watched on Sky 1 by 776,000 viewers. This was down slightly from the 795,000 viewers in the earlier hour, but was an increase of over 4% from the previous week's episode, "Prom-asaurus", which attracted 744,000 viewers.

In Australia, "Nationals" was broadcast on May 24, 2012, a week after "Props" aired, rather than on the same night as in the other three. It was watched by 618,000 viewers, up slightly from the 607,000 viewers for "Props" on May 17, 2012. Glee was the seventeenth most-watched program of the night for the second week in a row.

=== Critical reception ===
The episode was given positive reviews by most critics. Michael Slezak of TVLine described it as a "spectacular hour of jaw-dropping musical numbers and satisfying plot developments", and The A.V. Club's Emily VanDerWerff called it "one of the finest episodes the show's ever done and perhaps the best it's done since the season one finale". She gave it an "A" grade. Jeff Dodge of BuddyTV said that episode gave "quality to go along with some great music", and Entertainment Weekly's Erin Strecker wrote that the evening's two episodes were a "return to form for the show". Rae Votta of Billboard, on the other hand, said that by having "Props" and "Nationals" air back to back, "they both lose their individual potent high points and come out blander than they deserve", and characterized "Nationals" as "jarring and strange".

Both Huffington Post's Crystal Bell and Washington Post's Jen Chaney wanted to "be honest" about Vocal Adrenaline vs. New Directions in the competition: Bell said that Vocal Adrenaline "put on the better show" and Chaney wrote that they were "better than New Directions": "their dance moves were sharper and more in sync, and Unique's Minaj-esque magnetism factor sold the whole thing". VanDerWerff wrote that he "could quibble that Vocal Adrenaline had stronger choreography overall" or that he "found Unique a more engaging performer than Rachel", but that as "New Directions also used its whole ensemble better than Vocal Adrenaline did", he felt that "either outcome seemed reasonable". Dodge simply stated, "We all knew that New Directions would win and they'd get their happily ever after, but it was exciting to see it finally all play out." Bell wrote that "seeing the judges debate behind-the-scenes kind of takes away the entire title", though she appreciated Lohan's Freaky Friday reference. VanDerWerff said that the judging scene "wasn't very good", and Votta described it as "mostly waste[d]". Futterman wrote that there was "not really any emotion" in Lohan's lines, though Strecker thought that the "lines they gave her were pretty funny—if not a bit sad".

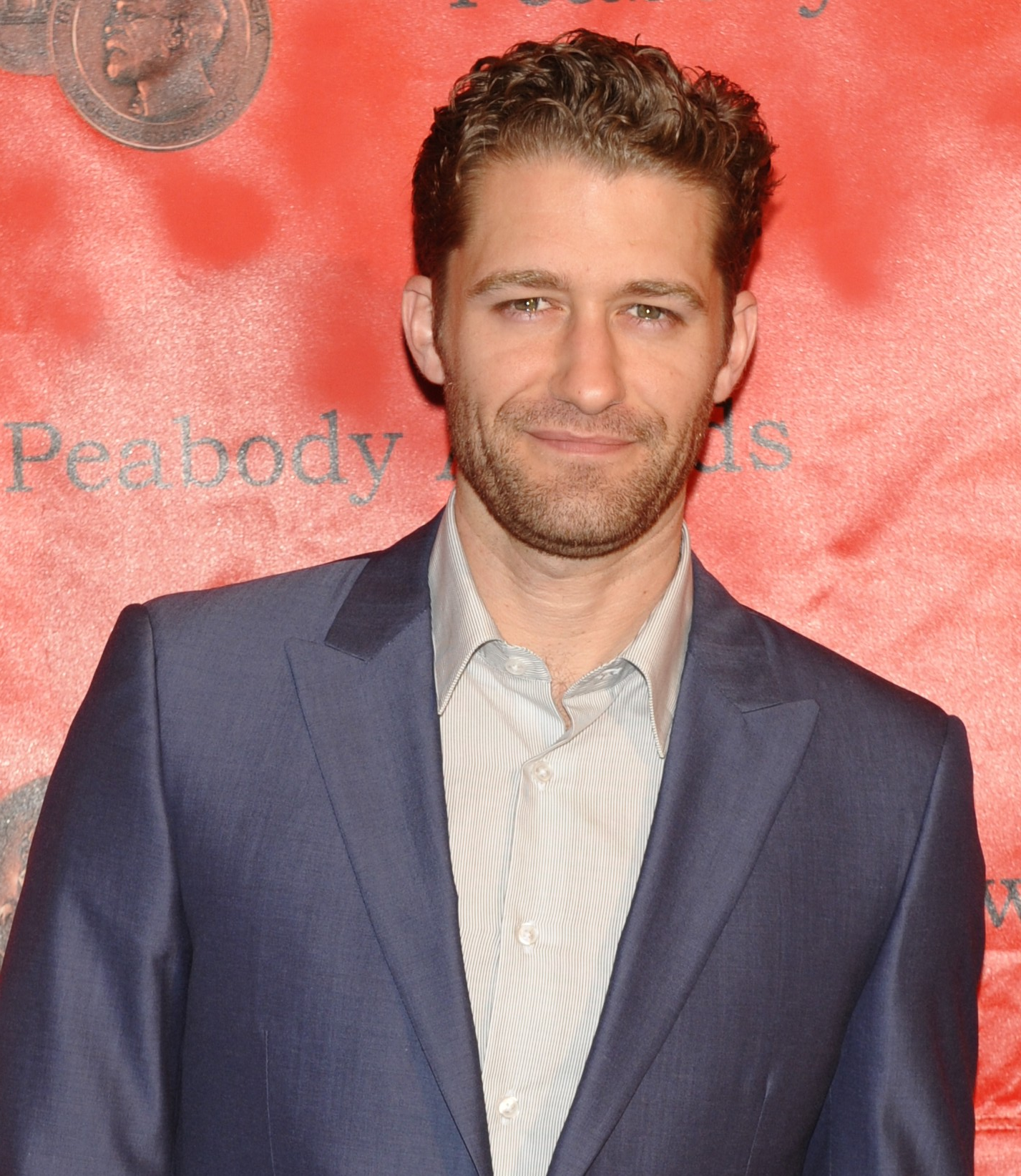
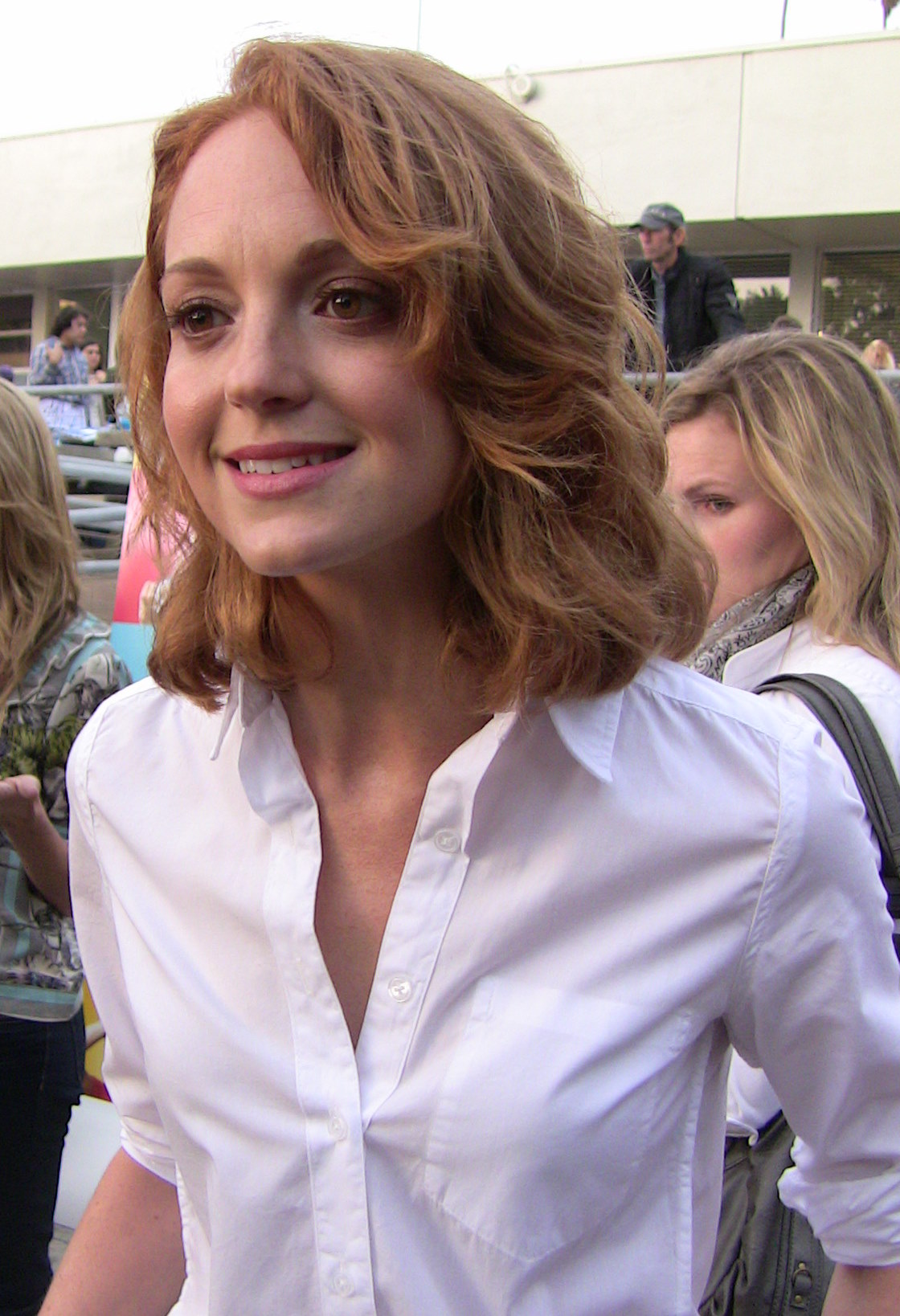
Reviewers criticized the lead-up to Will (Morrison, left) and Emma (Mays, right) having sex for the first time.

Reviewers were critical of what Votta called "a really regrettable sequence where Emma leaves a pamphlet about losing her virginity on Schue's desk and then they finally have sex". Bell characterized it as "weird and uncomfortable, and the reasoning was horrendously misogynistic", and VanDerWerff thought that making it part of the post-Nationals victory montage as "a little too creepy, at best". Votta thought that though the victory segment "should feel joyous", it instead feels "awkward and emotion-less". Will's being awarded "Teacher of the Year" was called "surprising" by Strecker, who hearkened back to him having "discovered that he wasn't so good" at teaching Spanish "a few months ago". Bell asked how it was "possible" for Quinn to so rapidly recover her ability to walk and then dance, something also touched on by VanDerWerff, who was again critical of "Fox's rampant abuse of the Twitter hashtag thing" by displaying onscreen hashtags during the episode. Strecker praised Jesse's scenes, and said she "couldn't stop cracking up".

=== Music and performances ===
As with the episode, the musical performances were mostly received with enthusiasm by reviewers. VanDerWerff wrote that the "big performances" were "all aces". Of the seven songs, the one that received the fewest comments was "Tongue Tied", which Strecker described as "montage music" and graded a "B". As Chaney noted, it "wasn't a number so much as a musical celebration of New Directions' championship status", but it nevertheless received an "A−" grade from her and from Slezak. Rolling Stone's Erica Futterman called it a "spirited take on Grouplove".

Of all the songs performed in competition, "The Edge of Glory" was given the most mixed reception. Chaney gave the song a "C" grade, and said that while it "started strong" the energy level was "lacking", a word that Futterman used to describe the performance as a whole, to which she added "emotionless and rushed". A diametric view of the song was evident in the "A−" grades given by both Slezak and Strecker, and the latter also complimented the "different" arrangement while both were enthusiastic about the entire set of three songs: Slezak said New Directions "completely killed it", and Strecker said this song "kicked off what was a truly an all-time great performance".

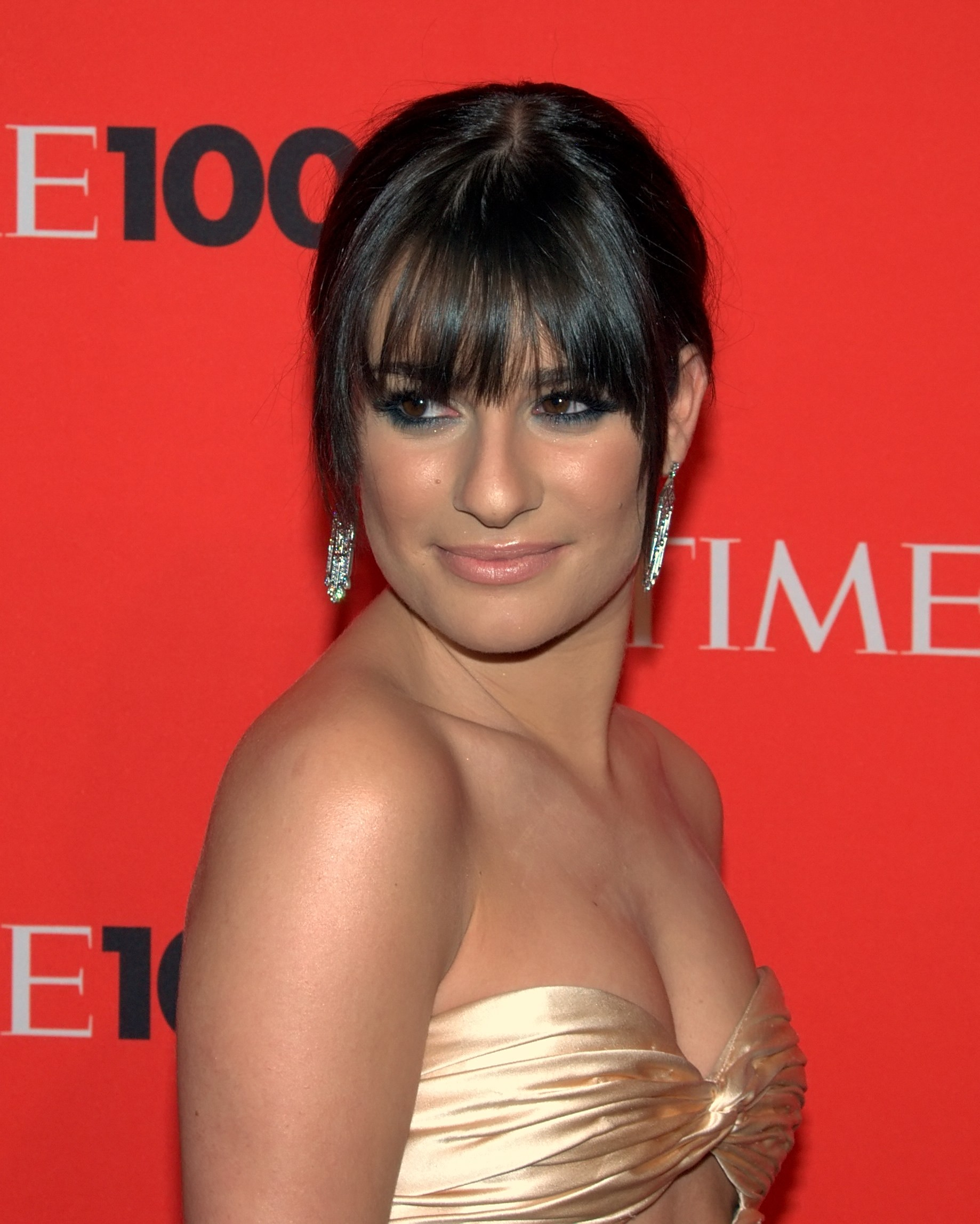
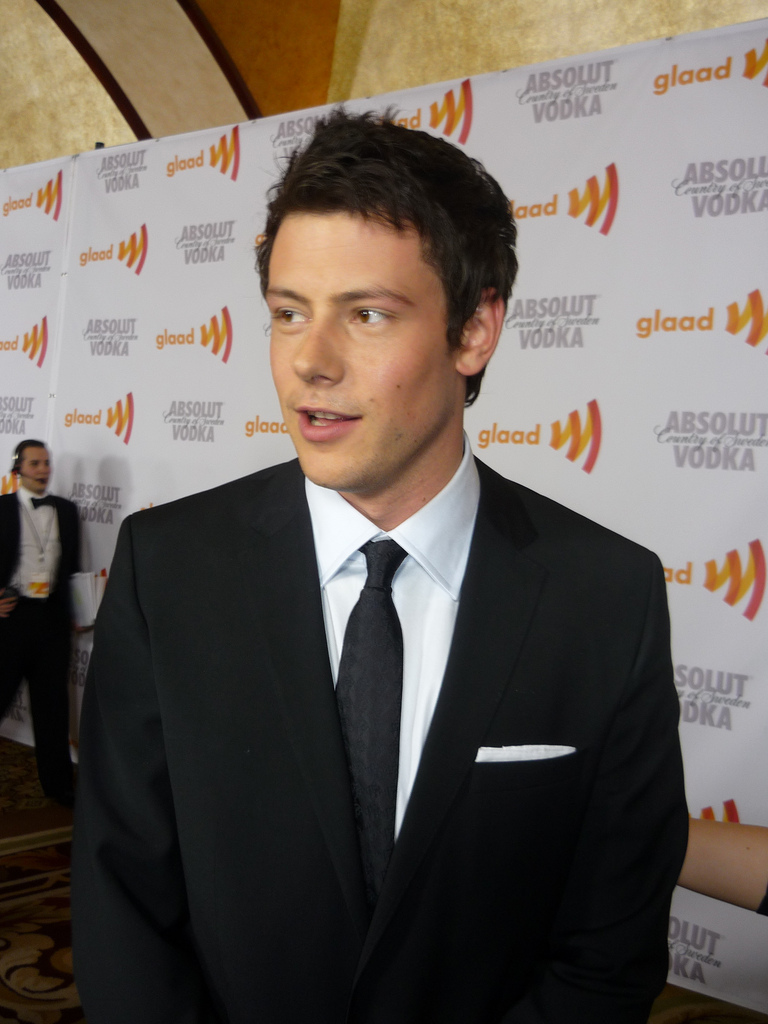
The singing of Rachel (Michele, left) and Finn (Monteith, right) was greatly praised by reviewers.

That performance continued with "It's All Coming Back to Me Now", which was widely praised. Dodge said that it, like the prior song, was "covered to perfection". Although Chaney said she hated that song, she wrote that Michele hit it "out of the park" and gave it an "A", the same grade Strecker gave with the encomium "outstanding", and added that she then "rewatched three times". An "A" was not sufficient for Slezak, who declared that it was "one of Glee's five best vocals ever" and gave it an "A+". Futterman "loved" the song except for its ending, which she described as "an abrupt cliffhanger".

The New Directions set closed with "Paradise by the Dashboard Light". While a number of reviewers, including Chaney and Dodge, questioned the choice of the song for a variety of reasons, they expressed enthusiasm with the final result. Jyll Saskin of MTV called it a "quirky yet catchy song choice" that "was the episode's standout", and both Slezak and Strecker gave it an "A" grade; the latter said it was the "real group number" of the three and added, "The vocals, choreography and energy were all top-notch." Chaney's grade of "A−" came with the declaration that "this may have been Finn at his absolute best" and Futterman said he did "a surprisingly decent Meatloaf"; Futterman added that the "already theatrical song is somehow made better by the show choir arrangement". VanDerWerff described it as "one of the better New Directions group performances".

The two Vocal Adrenaline performances were generally very well received; as noted above, Bell and Chaney used very similar words to explain why they thought Vocal Adrenaline was "better" than New Directions. "Starships", the first number, was also the more praised of the two: Houston Chronicle's Bobby Hankinson said that it "stole the show" for him, and was the best musical number of the night. Flandez called it "an electric and sassy delivery" by Unique, and Strecker asked "is there anything she can't do" before she gave the performance an "A−". Futterman thought it felt "more subdued than the warp-speed of Minaj's hit" though she added that the "stage acrobatics trump everything anyone else does", and Saskin said it "was fun to watch, but the vocals don't add much to the original version". Slezak gave it an "A" grade and praised the "dazzling" choreography of both numbers. "Pinball Wizard" was called "turbo-charged from beginning to end" by Flandez, and both Strecker and Slezak gave the song a "B+" grade; the former's enthusiasm was tempered by the arrangement, which was not very "different from just karaoke of the original", and the dancing on the pinball machines as "a bit much for my taste". Futterman said that Unique "riffs the hell out the song", but added that "the robot dancers of Vocal Adrenaline make it hard to glean any personality from the performance". Dodge wrote, "This one I'm liking even less than the first", but Saskin said, "Mercedes needs to watch out, because Unique sure can belt it out!"

The episode's closing number, "We Are the Champions", received excellent grades: A from Slezak and Chaney, and an "A−" from Strecker. Saskin wrote that it was "a new Glee classic", and Chaney said it "worked wonderfully as an assertion of the New Directions' championship status". Futterman described the performance as "rife with emotion" and added, "It's moments like this that are pure and straight to the show's original appeal", while Strecker complimented the song choice and how "it really showcased the group's harmonies". In December 2012, TV Guide listed the rendition as one of Glee's best performances.

=== Chart history ===
Two of the seven singles released for the episode charted on the Billboard Canadian Hot 100: "It's All Coming Back to Me Now", which debuted at number 75, and "Paradise by the Dashboard Light", which debuted at number 94. Neither song charted on the US Billboard Hot 100, but two other singles from the episode affected the charting there of songs by the original artists. "Tongue Tied" sold 22,000 copies in the Glee version, and did well enough in the Grouplove original to re-enter the Billboard Hot 100 at number 74, close to the song's previous chart high of 69, while "Starships" sold 18,000 in the Glee version and 174,000 in the Nicki Minaj original, which moved from six to five on the Hot 100, matching its highest chart position to date. "It's All Coming Back to Me Now" charted at number one at the Bubbling Under Hot 100 on June 2, 2012.
