= Tongue Tied (Grouplove song) =

Single by Grouplove

from the album Never Trust a Happy Song
- A-side: "Don't Fly Too Close to the Sun"
- Released: September 2, 2011
- Studio: Captain Cuts Studios, Los Angeles
- Genre: Indie pop; electropop; alternative rock
- Length: 3:40
- Label: Canvasback, Atlantic
- Songwriters: Hannah Hooper: Chris Zucconi; Sean Gadd; Ryan Rabin; Andrew Wessen
- Producer: Ryan Rabin

Grouplove singles chronology
"Colours" (2011)	"Tongue Tied" (2011)	"Lovely Cup" (2011)

Music video
- "Tongue Tied” on YouTube

"Tongue Tied" is a song by American indie rock band Grouplove, featured on their debut studio album Never Trust a Happy Song (2011). The song was released as the second single from the album on September 2, 2011. It was featured in an Apple iPod Touch commercial in 2011. On June 18, 2012, "Tongue Tied" reached the number-one position on the Billboard Alternative Songs chart, becoming their first number-one single. In May 2012, the song was covered by Fox television series Glee in the season 3 episode "Nationals". The song has also been performed on various late-night talk shows, and has also appeared in several other films and video games, such as The Three Stooges, Wadjda, Rock Band 4, GT Racing 2: The Real Car Experience, Premature and Fuser.

"Tongue Tied" received mixed reviews from critics, with criticism directed towards the over usage of synthesizers and its generic and formulaic nature. Despite this, it remains the band's only song to enter the Billboard Hot 100, where it peaked at 42, as well as number three on the Rock Songs chart.

== Background ==
"Tongue Tied" was written by the collective members of Grouplove and produced by Ryan Rabin. The song was recorded by Rabin at Captain Cuts Studios in Los Angeles, California. According to lead vocalist Christian Zucconi, "Tongue Tied" was conceived in swift fashion. While composing the piano score for a "really depressing, moody movie", (Note: Zucconi never specified which movie he was working on.) Zucconi began to play around with various chords before settling on a melody. He then performed an instrumental version for bandmates Hannah Hooper and Sean Gadd.

== Composition ==
"Tongue Tied" is a three-minute, 38-second rock and electropop song influenced by indie music. It incorporates elements of synthpop and post-punk. The song is composed in the key of E-flat major using common time and a moderate dance tempo of 106 beats per minute. Andrew Lentz of Drum Magazine noted that "Tongue Tied" has a "dance-y four-on-the-floor feel".

== Reception ==
"Tongue Tied" received mixed reviews from critics. Robert Cooke of Drowned in Sound said that the song's "bloated synth sounds like the soundtrack to an advert for some E number-riddled sweets written by Katy Perry, while the almost-rapping in the middle-eight sounds like a Pussycat Dolls pastiche". Matt Edsall of PopMatters said that the song "pumps Passion Pit-like beats that push the band into that same electro-pop category that so many other projects are involved in today, ruining the tone of the album a mere five minutes in". Max Raymond of musicOMH said that the song was a "potential summer smash but too sugar-coated in synths". Huw Jones of Slant Magazine said that "Tongue Tied" and the following track, "Lovely Cup", were lackluster songs that "completely derail the momentum". Matt Collar of AllMusic praised the song for its "rollicking, post-punk exuberance", while Mischa Pearlman of BBC Music said that the song's lyrics were at "beautiful odds with [the song's] bouncy tune".

== Music video ==
The music video, directed by Jordan Bahat, for "Tongue Tied" was released to Vevo and YouTube on July 25, 2011, The video has since gained over 39 million views. The video features the band at a party, and is entirely in reverse. The camera follows a man at the party running away from a group of masked people in suits, ultimately tripping and landing in an inflatable pool. At the beginning of the video, presumably the next morning, he is seen unconscious with his body partially inside of the inflatable pool, being observed by a family who had stumbled across him. At the end (Which, due to the video being in reverse, means it was actually the beginning of the series of events), he is seen eating a brownie presumably containing a psychoactive compound (such as marijuana or magic mushrooms), implying the entire series of events up to the point at which he was found asleep in the pool was a hallucination.

== Credits and personnel ==
Credits adapted from the liner notes of Never Trust a Happy Song.

- Performed and written by Grouplove
- Produced by Ryan Rabin
- Recorded at Captain Cuts Studios, Los Angeles
- Audio engineering by Ryan Rabin, Ryan McMahon
- Mixed by Michael H. Brauer, Ryan Gilligan
- Mastered by Greg Calbi

== Charts ==
=== Weekly charts ===
Chart (2011–2012)	Peak position
Australia (ARIA)	33
Canada Hot 100 (Billboard)	90
Canada Rock (Billboard)	23
Czech Republic Airplay (ČNS IFPI)	47
Japan Hot 100 (Billboard)	59
Scotland Singles (OCC)	83
UK Singles (OCC)	84
US Billboard Hot 100	42
US Adult Pop Airplay (Billboard)	19
US Hot Rock & Alternative Songs (Billboard)	3
US Pop Airplay (Billboard)	23

=== Year-end charts ===
Chart (2012)	Peak position
US Hot Rock Songs (Billboard)	6

== Certifications ==
Region	Certification	Certified units/sales
Australia (ARIA)	Gold	35,000^{^}
Canada (Music Canada)	Gold	40,000^{*}
New Zealand (RMNZ)	3× Platinum	90,000^{‡}
United Kingdom (BPI)	Platinum	600,000^{‡}
United States (RIAA)	5× Platinum	5,000,000^{‡}
^{*} Sales figures based on certification alone.^{^} Shipments figures based on certification alone.^{‡} Sales+streaming figures based on certification alone.
