= Grouplove (EP) =

EP by Grouplove
- Released: 26 September 2010
- Genre: Indie rock
- Length: 22:31
- Label: Dew Process Canvasback/Atlantic (2011 Reissue)
- Producer: Ryan Rabin

Grouplove chronology
Grouplove (2010)	Never Trust a Happy Song (2011)

Grouplove is the self-titled debut EP by American indie rock band Grouplove. It was released on September 26, 2010, under Dew Process, and was later reissued through Canvasback and Atlantic.

The EP was positively received, with the BBC calling it "a nugget of golden pleasure, petite, but perfectly proportioned". Drowned in Sound gave it a 7/10 rating, describing it as "a more than passable introduction to America's latest underground discoveries".

== Track listing ==
All tracks are written by Christian Zucconi, Hannah Hooper, Sean Gadd, and Ryan Rabin.

No.	Title	Length
1.	"Colours"	4:14
2.	"Naked Kids"	3:28
3.	"Gold Coast"	4:54
4.	"Getaway Car"	3:48
5.	"Don't Say Oh Well"	2:38
6.	"Get Giddy"	4:09
Total length:		22:31
