= Goodbye (Glee) =

- Glee episode
- Episode no.: Season 3 Episode 22
- Directed by: Brad Falchuk
- Written by: Brad Falchuk
- Production code: 3ARC22
- Original air date: May 22, 2012

Guest appearances
- Gloria Estefan as Maribel Lopez; Mike O'Malley as Burt Hummel; Iqbal Theba as Principal Figgins; Dot-Marie Jones as Shannon Beiste; Romy Rosemont as Carole Hudson-Hummel; Chord Overstreet as Sam Evans; NeNe Leakes as Roz Washington; Samuel Larsen as Joe Hart; Damian McGinty as Rory Flanagan; Vanessa Lengies as Sugar Motta; Kathleen M. Darcy as Eleanor Doosenbury; Keong Sim as Michael Chang, Sr.; Tamlyn Tomita as Julia Chang; Charlotte Ross as Judy Fabray; Gina Hecht as Mrs. Puckerman; James Lipton as himself

Episode chronology
| ← Previous "Nationals" | Next → "The New Rachel" |
- Glee season 3

"Goodbye" is the twenty-second episode and season finale of the third season of the American musical television series Glee, and the sixty-sixth overall. Written and directed by Brad Falchuk, it aired on Fox in the United States on May 22, 2012. It features the graduation of the McKinley High class of 2012, and with it, eight members of the New Directions glee club. The episode introduces special guest star Gloria Estefan as Maribel Lopez, Santana's (Naya Rivera) mother, and has appearances by six other parents of graduating seniors.

The episode was well received by many reviewers, though some were not as happy with it. The enthusiastic ones cited the combination of humor and tears, past events and present revelation, while those who were more critical felt there was not enough time to wrap up all the storylines or that it strayed into sappiness. Particular praise was given to the scene with Burt and Kurt Hummel that featured the former's "Single Ladies (Put a Ring On It)" number, which was the favorite performance of the reviewers, and the scene when Finn tells Rachel he's sending her to New York instead of marrying her, which was described as Monteith's and Michele's best acting on the show. Monteith was also praised for his solo in the song "You Get What You Give", and Michele's rendition of "Roots Before Branches" received even higher marks. Other songs were given a less enthusiastic reception.

"Goodbye" attracted 7.46 million American viewers during its initial broadcast and received a 2.9/8 Nielsen rating/share in the 18–49 demographic, a significant increase over the prior episode's 2.5/7 rating/share and 6.03 million viewers on May 15, 2012.

== Plot ==
Will (Matthew Morrison) gives the members of New Directions one final assignment: perform songs to say goodbye to each other. He starts by singing "Forever Young". The graduating seniors as a group perform "You Get What You Give", and tell the underclassmen that it is now their glee club. The underclassmen, joined by Will, sing "In My Life" to express their gratitude to the seniors.

Kurt (Chris Colfer) reflects on how his experience at McKinley High has enabled other students to be openly gay. His father (Mike O'Malley) meets him in the school auditorium and recalls the evolution of their relationship. Tina (Jenna Ushkowitz) and Brittany (Heather Morris) then join him on the stage to help him re-enact the turning point, which serves as Kurt's graduation gift: the "Single Ladies" dance. Kurt and Blaine (Darren Criss) pledge to remain a couple, despite being in different cities come the fall.

Mercedes (Amber Riley) has been offered a recording contract as a backup singer and will be moving to Los Angeles; Mike (Harry Shum, Jr.) has accepted a scholarship to the Joffrey Ballet in Chicago. Both revelations upset Santana (Naya Rivera), who has a cheerleading scholarship from the University of Louisville, yet wants to be a performer like them. Brittany announces that she will not be graduating, and Santana tells her mother, Maribel (Gloria Estefan), that she will stay in Lima. Maribel later gives Santana the money that she had been saving for Santana's college education. When Santana tells her that she still doesn’t want to go to college, Maribel tells her to use it for New York, saying she trusts her to follow her dreams.

Quinn (Dianna Agron) helps Puck (Mark Salling) study for the test he needs to pass in order to graduate. She tells him that with all they went through, they are bonded for life, and she kisses him. Emboldened, Puck passes his test. Later, Quinn returns her cheerleading uniform to Sue (Jane Lynch). Sue tells her to keep her uniform, as she plans on retiring it and the two have a tearful farewell.

Will tells Finn (Cory Monteith) that he had planted marijuana in Finn's locker in order to blackmail him into joining the glee club, which Finn thinks makes him "even cooler". Finn is disappointed that the Army refused to change his late father's dishonorable discharge to an honorable one, and wonders to his mother (Romy Rosemont) whether his father would be proud of him if he became an actor.

After the graduation ceremony, Finn, Kurt, and Rachel (Lea Michele) gather to open their acceptance letters—Finn for the Actors Studio and Kurt and Rachel for NYADA. Finn and Kurt are rejected, while Rachel is admitted; she decides to defer her admission for a year to help the other two reapply so the trio can go to New York together. She gets into Finn's car to go to their wedding, but instead of driving to the wedding venue, Finn drives her to the train station. He tells her that he loves her too much to marry her if it means she has to give up her dreams; he also reveals that he will be joining the Army. Will and the glee club meet them on the train platform to say goodbye, and a crying Rachel sings "Roots Before Branches" as she boards the train for New York.

== Production ==
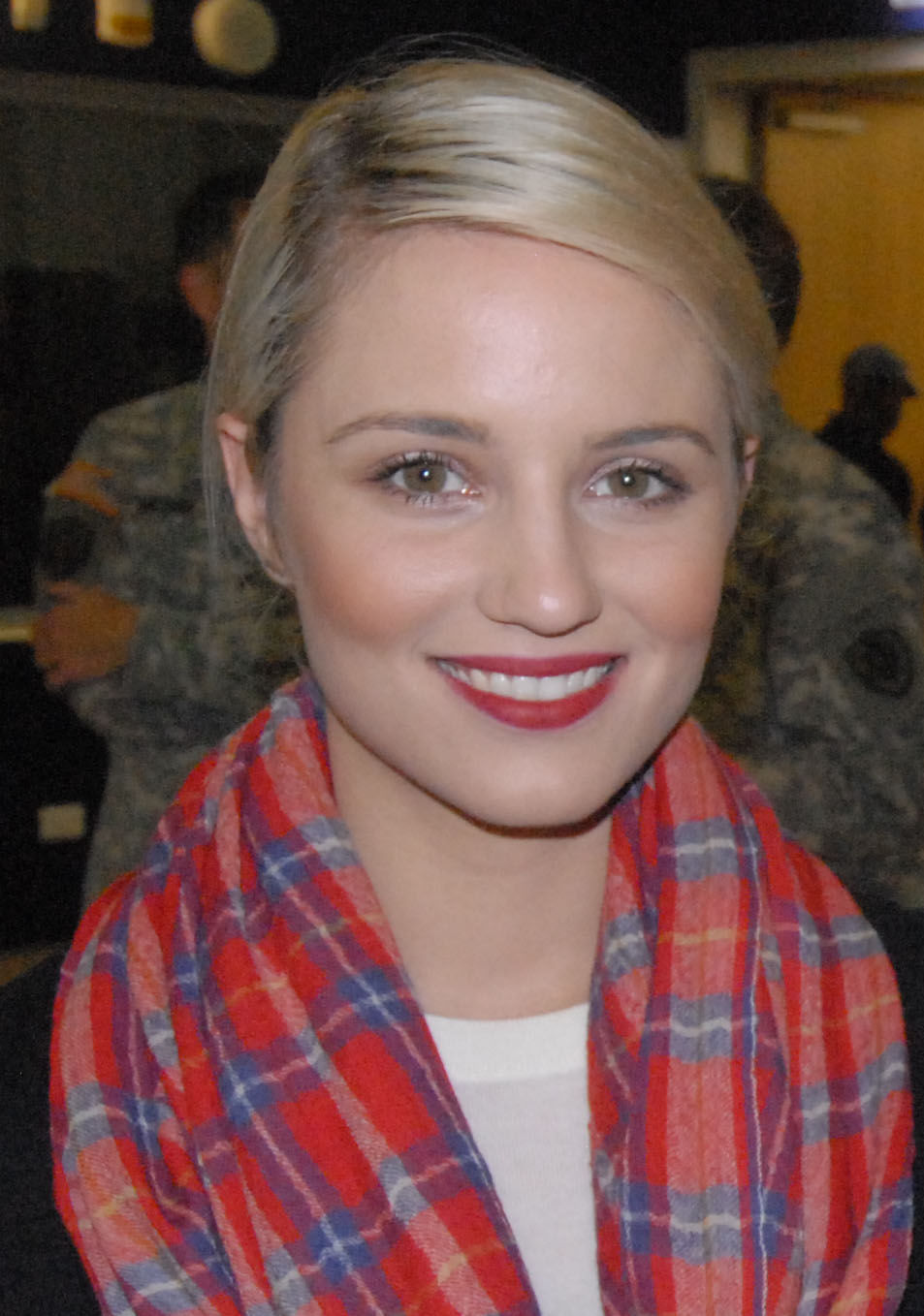
"Goodbye" marked Dianna Agron's final appearance as a regular in the series

The season's final episode was written and directed by series co-creator Brad Falchuk. Shooting began on April 30, 2012, and was scheduled to take two weeks. The cast recorded their final vocal tracks for the episode's songs on April 21, 2012, and the final scene was shot late on the evening of May 10, 2012.

Some scenes for the episode have been filmed on location in New York City. Falchuk tweeted two photos on the evening of Monday, May 7, 2012. One was a photo of Lea Michele sitting on a suitcase on a sidewalk, along with the message, "Two from yesterday. Yep. NYC Sunday, back in LA Monday."

It was originally announced that this episode would include eight songs from the album Glee: The Music, The Graduation Album. However, only five of the album's tracks are used in the episode, none of which have been released separately as singles. These are Bruce Springsteen's "Glory Days" performed by Monteith and Salling, Madonna's "I'll Remember" performed by Colfer, New Radicals' "You Get What You Give" performed by the graduating members of New Directions, Rod Stewart's "Forever Young" performed by Morrison, and Room for Two's "Roots Before Branches" performed by Michele and Monteith. The episode also has new performances of three songs that are not on the album. "In My Life" by The Beatles, performed by the non-graduating members of New Directions, is the only song that has been released as a single available for digital download. The other two are repeat performances of "Sit Down, You're Rockin' the Boat" from Guys and Dolls, first sung in the series' pilot by Colfer, Michele, Kevin McHale, Ushkowitz and Riley, and Beyoncé's "Single Ladies (Put a Ring on It)" from "Preggers", performed by O'Malley, Ushkowitz, and Morris; both numbers include flashbacks to the original performances, which for "Single Ladies" included Colfer rather than O'Malley. There is another flashback to the pilot episode showing Monteith's a cappella performance of "Can't Fight This Feeling" by REO Speedwagon.

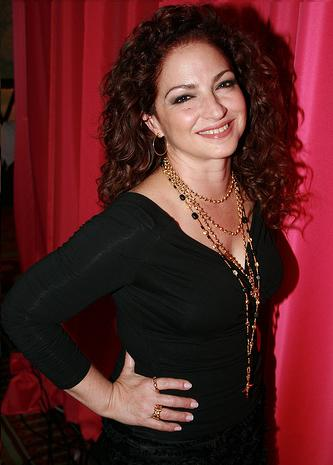
Although Gloria Estefan (pictured) was reported to have signed to play Santana's mother in early December 2011, her debut was in the season finale

Gloria Estefan makes a special guest appearance as Maribel Lopez, the mother of Santana Lopez (Naya Rivera). Estefan was reported to be in talks to play Santana's mother as early as November 30, 2011, the morning after the episode "I Kissed a Girl" aired. After the episode, in which Santana comes out as a lesbian and her grandmother—the only relative of hers shown on screen—disowns her, though Santana says her parents accepted the news, Estefan tweeted, "Did anyone see Glee last night? Santana could really use a sympathetic mommy right about now, don't you think?? Lol!" Estefan was definitively reported as having signed to be a guest star on December 8, 2011, and as being scheduled to appear in one of the then-upcoming winter episodes, but this episode marks her debut on the show.

Many recurring guest stars appeared in the episode. These include glee club members Sam Evans (Chord Overstreet), Joe Hart (Samuel Larsen), Rory Flanagan (Damian McGinty) and Sugar Motta (Vanessa Lengies), Principal Figgins (Iqbal Theba), football coach Shannon Beiste (Dot-Marie Jones), synchronized swimming coach Roz Washington (NeNe Leakes), European geography teacher Eleanor Doosenbury (Kathleen M. Darcy), and the parents of many other graduating students: Kurt's father Burt Hummel (Mike O'Malley), Finn's mother Carole Hudson-Hummel (Romy Rosemont), Mike's parents Michael Chang, Sr. (Keong Sim) and Julia Chang (Tamlyn Tomita), Quinn's mother Judy Fabray (Charlotte Ross) and Puck's mother (Gina Hecht). James Lipton of the Actors Studio makes an appearance as himself.

On August 6, 2012, co-creator Ryan Murphy uploaded a deleted scene from this episode to YouTube in which Kurt reads a message Rachel wrote in his yearbook. On August 9, 2012, Murphy uploaded a second deleted scene, this one featuring Mike and Tina, in which Mike's parents give him a graduation present. Murphy noted that the episode had initially run "15 minutes long", and these were two of the scenes that were cut from the finished version.

== Reception ==
=== Ratings ===
"Goodbye" was first broadcast on May 22, 2012 in the United States on Fox, an hour later than its usual time, in order to air after the first day of the two-day American Idol finale. This was the same time that the previous episode, "Nationals" aired the week before as the second hour in a two-hour special evening. "Goodbye" received a 2.9/8 Nielsen rating/share in the 18–49 demographic and attracted 7.46 million American viewers during its initial broadcast, a significant increase over the prior episode's 2.5/7 rating/share and 6.03 million viewers on May 15, 2012.

In Canada, which also aired the episode an hour later than usual on the same day as its American premiere and immediately following American Idol, viewership rose by over 4% to 1.63 million viewers from the 1.56 million viewers who watched "Nationals" at the same hour the week before. "Goodbye" was the seventh most-viewed show of the week, an improvement of three slots over "Nationals", which had been the tenth most-viewed.

In the United Kingdom, "Goodbye" first aired on May 24, 2012, at the show's usual time, which was the same time that "Nationals" had aired the previous week. It was watched on Sky 1 by 776,000 viewers, the same number as had watched "Nationals". In Australia, "Goodbye" was broadcast on May 31, 2012. It was watched by 657,000 viewers, up over 6% from the 618,000 viewers for "Nationals" on May 24, 2012. Glee was the twelfth most-watched program of the night, up from seventeenth the week before.

=== Critical reception ===
The episode was well received by many critics, though some were not as happy with it. The A.V. Club's Emily VanDerWerff gave it an "A" grade, and wrote that what she "liked most of all" was it being "remarkably clear-eyed about who these people are and what they're capable of". Crystal Bell of Huffington Post described it as "heartfelt, comical and, yes, absolutely ridiculous", and The Hollywood Reporter's Lesley Goldberg called it a "tearful and touching finale". Though she acknowledged exceptions, Erica Futterman of Rolling Stone characterized the episode as a "nonstop sapfest of too many tears and not enough nostalgia", while Entertainment Weekly's Erin Strecker said it had "the perfect amount of flashbacks and revelations" and described it as "a season finale that sure felt like a series finale". Rae Votta of Billboard wrote that "there simply isn't enough time to settle the fates of so many seniors in a mere hour", a sentiment also expressed by Houston Chronicle's Bobby Hankinson, who thought the episode might have "felt a little more logical if it was given a full two hours to breathe". Hankinson also said it left him with "mostly questions" but also "some fury". TV Guide's two reviewers were both enthusiastic: Kate Stanhope described is as a "perfect mix of the kids' past, present and future", and Damian Holbrook wrote that the "class of 2012 went out on a high note with a season finale so solid, emotional and entertaining, you would have thought you were watching one of the show's first 13 episodes".

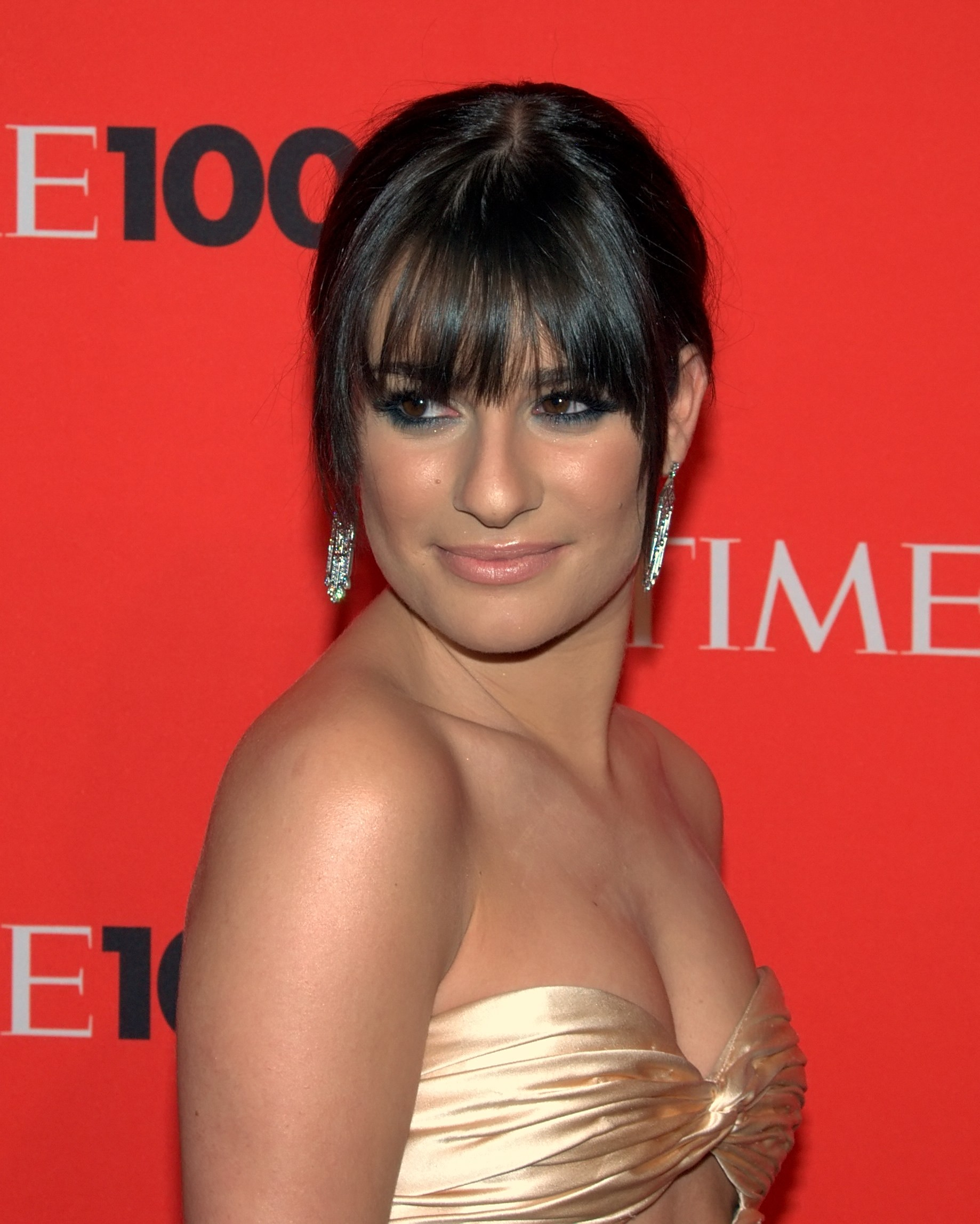
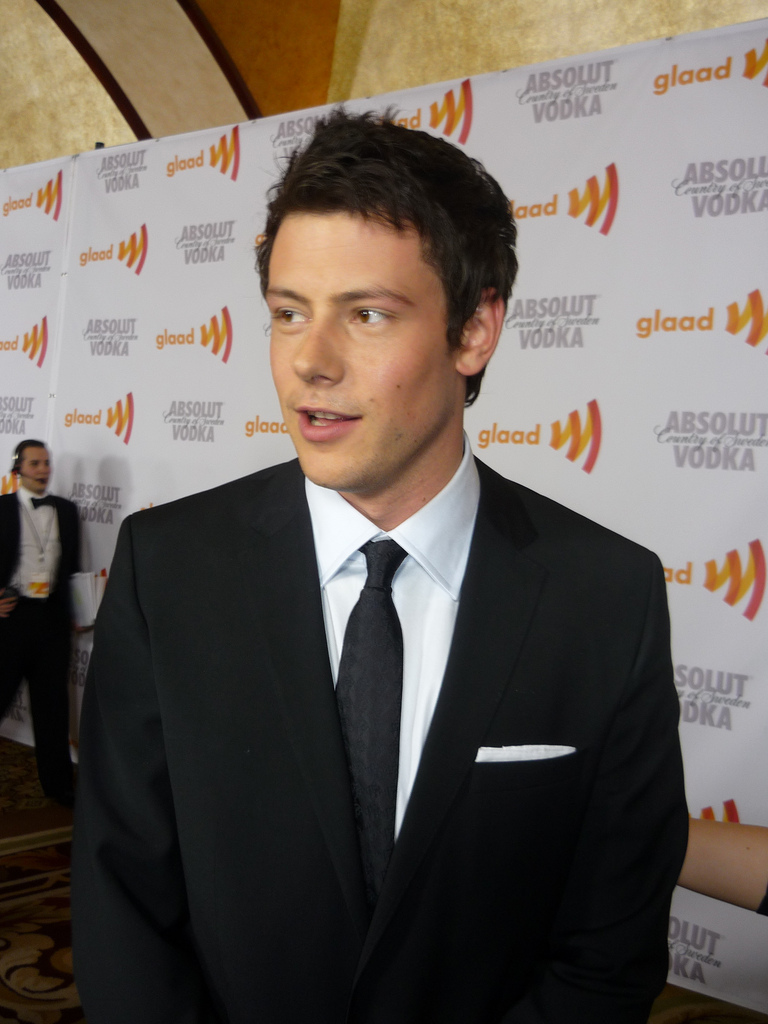
Reviewers were impressed with the scene between Rachel (Michele, left) and Finn (Monteith, right) when he tells her he's sending her to New York.

VanDerWerff called Kurt opening his NYADA rejection letter "as good a gut-punch as I can think of for this series", though John Kubicek of BuddyTV characterized it as "the most unbelievable plot twist ever on this show". Bell hoped that this would extend his stay in Lima because it could give "more screen time for Burt Hummel, who is arguably the best character on Glee". The scene where Burt gives Kurt his present was described as a "gift" by many reviewers. Kubicek wrote, "Kudos to Glee for turning a sappy moment into a funny one", and Strecker noted how powerful scenes typically were between the Hummels before she added "last night was no exception", and ended by quoting Kurt: "Best. Graduation Gift. Ever."

The Wall Street Journal's Raymund Flandez deemed "unrealistic" the notion that Santana's mother would allow the money she had saved for Santana's college expenses to be "wasted on a dream", and Bell described it as "too good to be true". Michael Slezak of TVLine agreed and called Maribel "crazily lenient", but said Estefan had done "good work". Kubicek, however, maintained that Estefan was wasted in the role, and Futterman wrote that the "choppy, random scenes would have been a lot better with some Gloria Estefan singing".

The scene where Finn tells Rachel he's sending her to New York instead of marrying her both surprised and impressed reviewers. Strecker called it one of her "favorite non-singing scenes of the year, possibly the series", and VanDerWerff put it even more strongly: "It's one of the best things I've seen on TV this year". Both Monteith and Michele were praised for their acting: Slezak said it was their "best work", VanDerWerff said they "kill[ed]" the scene, and Bell said it was "some of Cory Monteith's finest acting". Rachel's arrival in New York brought comparisons to Mary Tyler Moore from Bell and Strecker; as the latter put it, "she's going to make it after all".

=== Music and performances ===
The performances were given generally good marks by reviewers, and the one that received the most enthusiastic reception was not for singing at all, but Burt's lipsynch and dance to "Single Ladies (Put a Ring On It)" with the aid of Tina and Brittany. Futterman called it the "best gift of the season" and Slezak said it was "another shining moment for Glee's best parental unit" and gave it an "A−". Bell wrote "I loved every second of it", and E! Online's Jenna Mullins described it as the episode's "rewind moment". Jen Chaney of The Washington Post was fond of the other flashback number, "Sit Down You're Rockin' the Boat", to which she gave an "A−" and commented, "it was a nice reminder of how far these plucky Glee kids have come". MTV's Fallon Prinzivalli was not as enthusiastic about the repeat performance, and said it was "not much better" than the pilot rendition and he was "happy to see their version of the song retired".

"Forever Young" generated differing reactions from reviewers. Slezak wondered whether Will's "diminished role this year" reduced the impact of his farewell song and gave it a "B", and Futterman wrote that "while the bare-bones guitar arrangement is suitably melancholy, Schue's voice never quite settles in, seeming forced the whole way through". Strecker thought "it sounded lovely", gave it a "B+" and asked for more in the next season, and Chaney graded it an "A" and said that it was "sweet". The same word, "sweet", was applied by Slezak to Kurt's rendition of "I'll Remember"; he called the song an "underrated Madonna ballad" and graded it a "B+". Chaney, however, said it was "not one of Madonna's best" and the performance "not particularly memorable", so she gave it a "B−", while Pinzivalli wrote "leave this one to Madge". Futterman characterized Kurt as "dapper and emotional while singing in a crisp, clear and natural voice", though she wanted the performance to be "more than everyone's sad faces". Strecker's grade was an "A−", and she wrote that "Colfer sold it" and that it was a "nice arrangement for his voice".

"You Get What You Give" by the graduating seniors was welcomed by reviewers. Prinzivalli called it "one of Cory Monteith's best solos all season" and a fun cover, while Futterman described it as "fine and fun, but nothing really spectacular". Slezak gave it an "A" and wrote, "this spirited rendition captured [the song's] jaunty essence", and Strecker noted with her "B+" that "this was the moment when it really kicked in that the show will never be the same". Chaney also complimented Finn for having gotten "the hang of this whole singing-and-dancing thing in the last three episodes of this season" and gave a grade of "B". She gave an "A" to "In My Life", sung by the underclassmen, and said "the harmonies sounded lovely"; Bell called it "a perfect song to signify graduation". Others were less enthusiastic: Futterman described it as "a blended-past-recognition, laden-with-harmonies Beatles tune" and the point where the show "entered sappy hour", and Slezak said it was "not the most ringing endorsement for the National Champions' 2013 chances" and graded it a "C+".

Reviewers wondered at the inclusion of "Glory Days". Chaney stated, "There is no way anyone should have been blaring Springsteen in the middle of a commencement ceremony", and Slezak called the song "a tone-deaf choice for modern teenagers on their big day"; their grades were "B" and "C+" respectively. Strecker merely noted that the ceremony "doubled as a performance" when she gave her "B+", and Futterman thought it looked "more like a fashion show than a graduation ceremony".

The show's final number, "Roots Before Branches", was greatly praised. Although Hankinson was "hoping for a Journey reprise" or some other big group number, he noted that Rachel "kill[ed] it", and Prinzivalli said "Lea Michele shines as always". Strecker, Slezak and Chaney each gave the performance an "A": Chaney called it a "well-chosen song" and Slezak wrote that he was glad to be introduced to it at the episode's "triumphant ending for a girl chasing her dreams, not her delusions, in the streets of New York City".
