= Big Mess (Grouplove album) =

Studio album by Grouplove
- Released: September 9, 2016; August 17, 2017 (streaming re-release)
- Genre: Indie pop, alternative rock, indie rock, electronic rock, synth-pop, alternative dance
- Length: 40:09
- Label: Canvasback/Atlantic
- Producer: Ryan Rabin, Phil Ek, Captain Cuts

Grouplove chronology
Spreading Rumours (2013)	Big Mess (2016)	Little Mess (2017)

Singles from Big Mess
- 1. "Welcome to Your Life" Released: July 15, 2016; 2. "Do You Love Someone" Released: 2016; 3. "Traumatized" Released: 2016; 4. "Enlighten Me" Released: 2016; 5. "Good Morning" Released: February 7, 2017; 6. "Remember That Night" Released: August 17, 2017

Professional ratings
Aggregate scores
Source	Rating
Metacritic	64/100
Review scores
Source	Rating
AllMusic	4.5/5 stars
Drowned in Sound	(3/10)
Rolling Stone Australia	4/5 stars

Big Mess is the third studio album by the indie rock band Grouplove. It was released on September 9, 2016, and later re-released to iTunes and Spotify on August 17, 2017, with a new track titled "Remember That Night". The track was released as a single the same day.

== Track listing ==
No.	Title	Length
1.	"Welcome to Your Life"	3:47
2.	"Do You Love Someone"	3:50
3.	"Standing in the Sun"	4:15
4.	"Enlighten Me"	3:52
5.	"Good Morning"	3:40
6.	"Spinning"	4:02
7.	"Cannonball"	3:17
8.	"Traumatized"	3:00
9.	"Heart of Mine"	3:16
10.	"Don't Stop Making It Happen"	3:00
11.	"Hollywood"	4:10

2017 streaming re-release bonus track
No.	Title	Length
12.	"Remember That Night"	3:03

== Personnel ==
- Christian Zucconi – lead vocals, rhythm guitar, piano
- Hannah Hooper – lead vocals, percussion, keyboards
- Andrew Wessen – lead guitar, backing vocals, vocals on "Cannonball"
- Daniel Gleason – bass guitar
- Ryan Rabin – drums, producer

== Charts ==
Chart (2016)	Peak position
Australian Albums (ARIA)	20
US Billboard 200	40

== Reception ==
An October 2016 review in Rolling Stone gave the album three stars, praising the second half of the album where the band was "mixing their wholesome quirkiness with edgier hooks and Sleigh Bells-esque percussion" and also the second track "Do You Love Someone", calling it a "lung-blasting joy".
