= Grouplove =

American alternative rock band

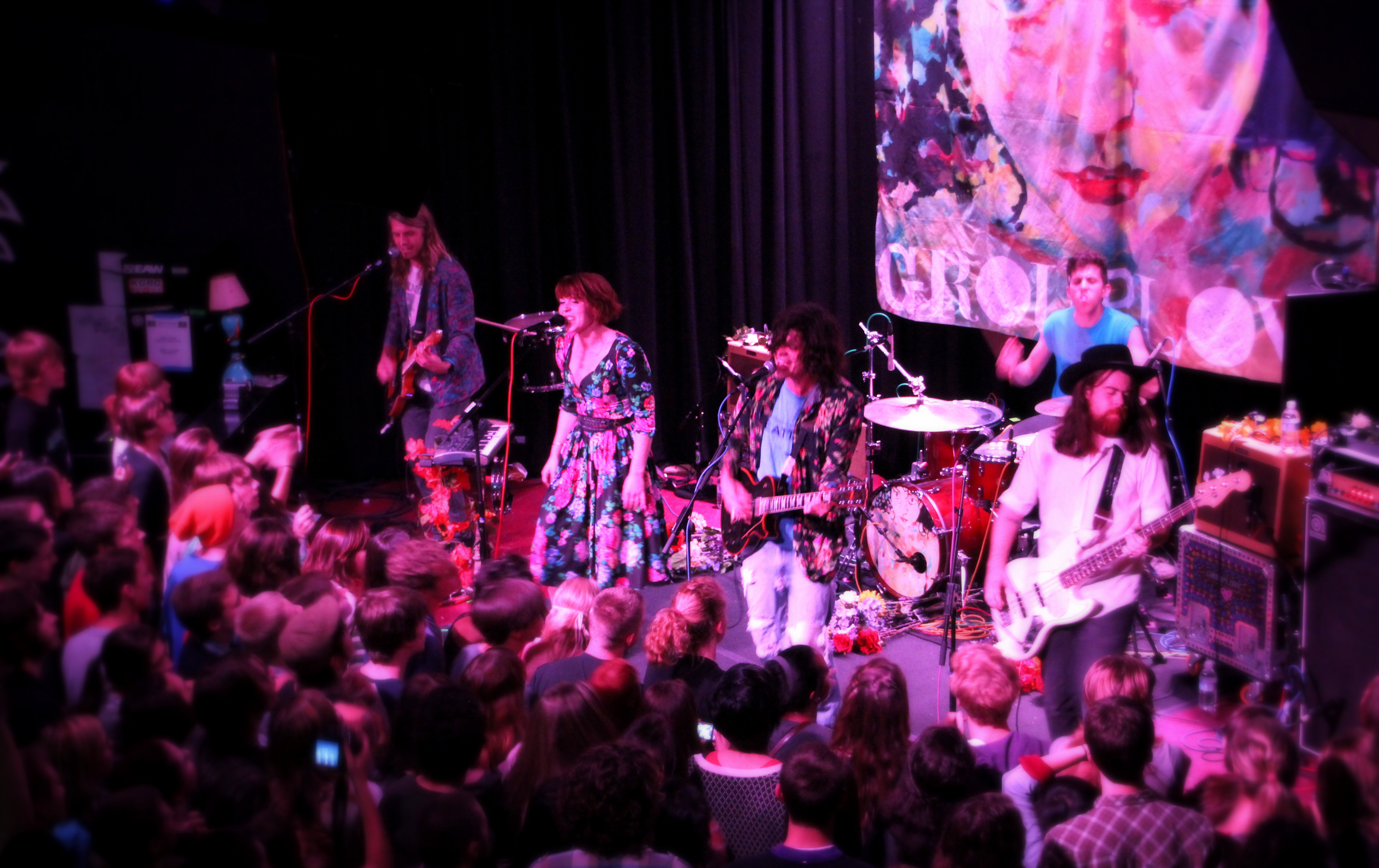
- Grouplove, performing at the Vera Project in Seattle on September 30, 2011

Background information
- Origin: Los Angeles, California
- Genres: Alternative rock, indie pop, electropop, alternative dance
- Years active: 2009–present
- Labels: Glassnote; Canvasback; Atlantic
- Members: Christian Zucconi; Hannah Hooper; Andrew Wessen; Daniel Gleason; Benjamin Homola
- Past members: Sean Gadd; Ryan Rabin
- Website: grouplovemusic.com

Grouplove (often typeset as GROUPLOVE) is an American alternative rock band formed in 2009 by Christian Zucconi (lead vocals, rhythm guitar), Hannah Hooper (lead vocals, keyboards), Sean Gadd (bass), Andrew Wessen (lead guitar, backing vocals), and Ryan Rabin (drums). The latter produced the band's self-titled debut extended play (2010), which was originally released independently, but later re-released by Atlantic Records following the success of its single, "Colours".

Grouplove is known for their 2011 single "Tongue Tied", which peaked within the top 50 of the Billboard Hot 100 and received quintuple platinum certification by the Recording Industry Association of America (RIAA). It preceded the release of their debut studio album, Never Trust a Happy Song (2011), which lukewarmly entered the Billboard 200. As of 2024, Grouplove has released six studio albums and two EPs.

== History ==
=== Formation (2009–2010) ===
Grouplove formed out of a friendship among the five members of the band. Hooper met Zucconi on the Lower East Side of Manhattan after hearing music from his former band ALOKE. Despite having just met, Hooper invited Zucconi to an artist residency in Crete she was leaving for later that week. It was at the Ikarus artist commune in the village of Avdou where they met the rest of the band, Andrew Wessen, Ryan Rabin, and Sean Gadd. Rabin, an accomplished drummer and producer, grew up in Los Angeles with Wessen, a surfer and guitarist. Rabin comes from a musical family – his father is Trevor Rabin, former guitarist of Yes. Sean Gadd, a songwriter and guitarist from London, was also at the commune. The friendship between the members formed quickly, but the band did not form until a year later after Gadd, Zucconi and Hooper pooled their funds together and made a trip to Rabin's Los Angeles recording studio. They played their first show at El Cid in Los Angeles on May 10, 2010. Later that year, the band went on tour with Florence and the Machine on the west coast, and then the Joy Formidable on the east coast. By November, Nylon Magazine recognized Grouplove as one of the top ten in the "Best New Bands in 2010."

Before signing with Canvasback/Atlantic Records the band licensed the song "Getaway Car" to HBO's How to Make it In America. Canvasback re-released their self-titled EP, Grouplove, on January 25, 2011. In 2011, the band co-headlined a cross-country tour with Foster the People, and made appearances at Lollapalooza, Outside Lands, Reading and Leeds Festivals, and Glastonbury.

=== Never Trust a Happy Song and Spreading Rumours (2011–2016) ===
The band released its debut album, Never Trust a Happy Song, on September 13, 2011, through Canvasback/Atlantic Records. They released 4 singles from the album – Colours (which was featured on FIFA 12, albeit as the Captain Cuts remix), "Tongue Tied" (which went on to score the band a no. 1 on the US Alternative Chart and featured in several commercials (including one for Apple, one for Coca-Cola and one for Persil and an episode of Fox's Glee) Lovely Cup and Itchin On A Photograph. In support of their debut album, the band went on a headlining North American Fall tour and also performed with Two Door Cinema Club as their main support. In December, the band performed at KROQ Almost Acoustic Christmas, which takes place at the Gibson Amphitheatre, in Universal City. On January 3, 2012, the band kicked off their sold-out headline tour in Australia at the Factory Theatre in Sydney and continued their tour in Europe in February. The band began their US Spring 2012 tour on March 6 in Burlington, Vermont in support of Young the Giant. Throughout the sold-out headline tour the band had featured stops at Coachella Valley Music and Arts Festival, Sasquatch! Music Festival, and Bonnaroo Music and Arts Festival.

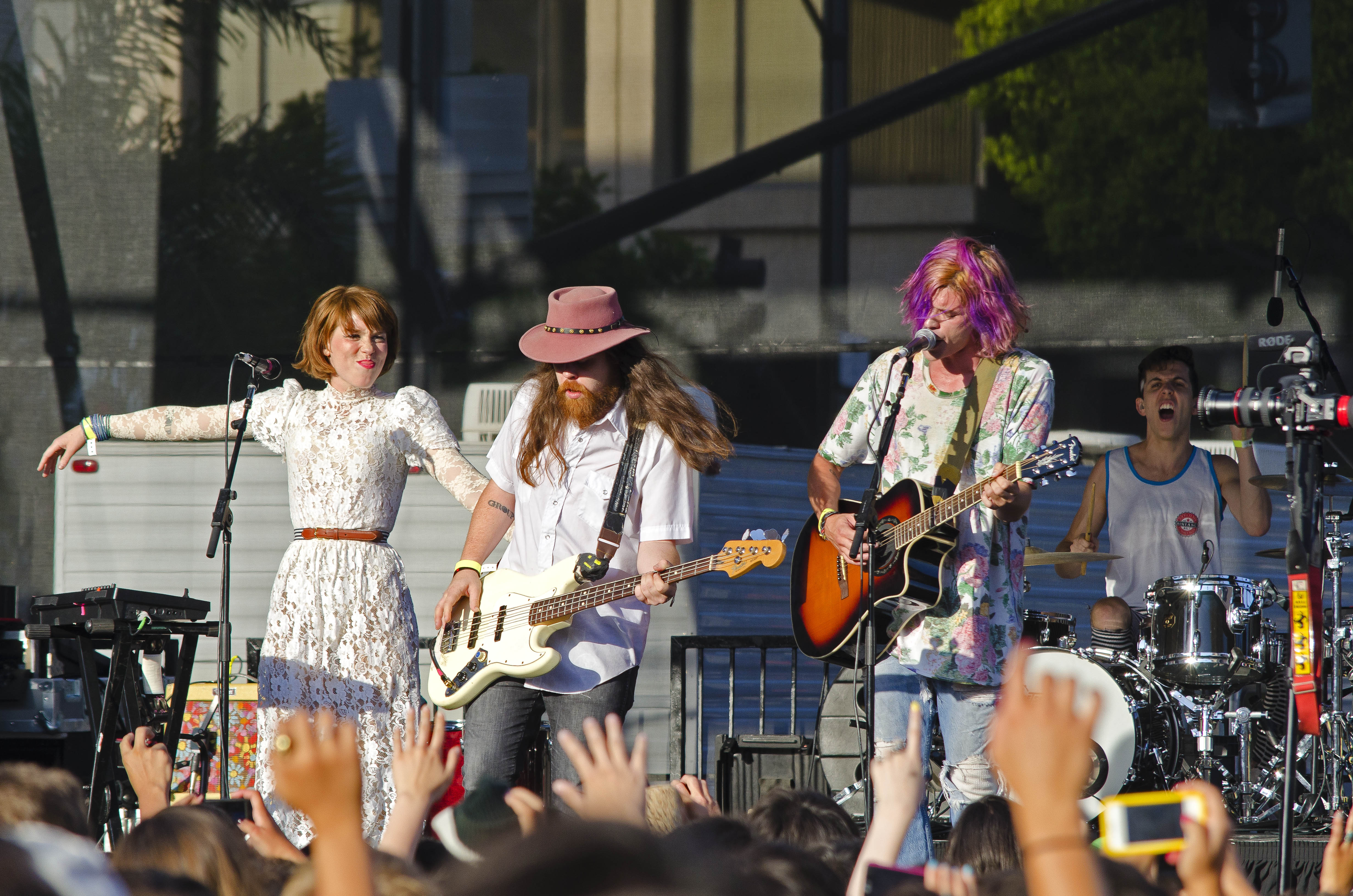
Grouplove performing in June 2012

Grouplove kicked off their Close Your Eyes and Count to Tour tour on September 25, 2012, at the Roseland Theater in Portland, Oregon, traveling across the country with Alt-J and MS MR as support. Close Your Eyes and Count to Tour ended on November 17, 2012, at the Wiltern in Los Angeles, California.

On April 20, 2013, Grouplove released "Make It To Me" in collaboration with Manchester Orchestra. They announced their second album, as well as debuting the video for the lead single, "Ways To Go", on 10 June 2013.

On September 17, 2013, Grouplove's second album, Spreading Rumours, was released. That same day, Grouplove played a sold-out show at the Troubadour in West Hollywood with supporting Australian band, the Rubens. The band then embarked on an 18-show US tour, the Seesaw Tour, on which they played in 9 cities, with two dates in each city – one a more standard show, the other a more stripped back show. They were supported on this tour by the Rubens.

In late 2013, Grouplove started touring with Daniel Gleason. This was temporary and was to allow Sean Gadd to do other work. Although rumors circulated that he left the band, he stated on Twitter that he was still part of Grouplove. Gleason then toured with the band on their 2014 US tour, on which they were supported by MS MR, and their subsequent European tour, on which they were supported by FEMME for the UK dates.

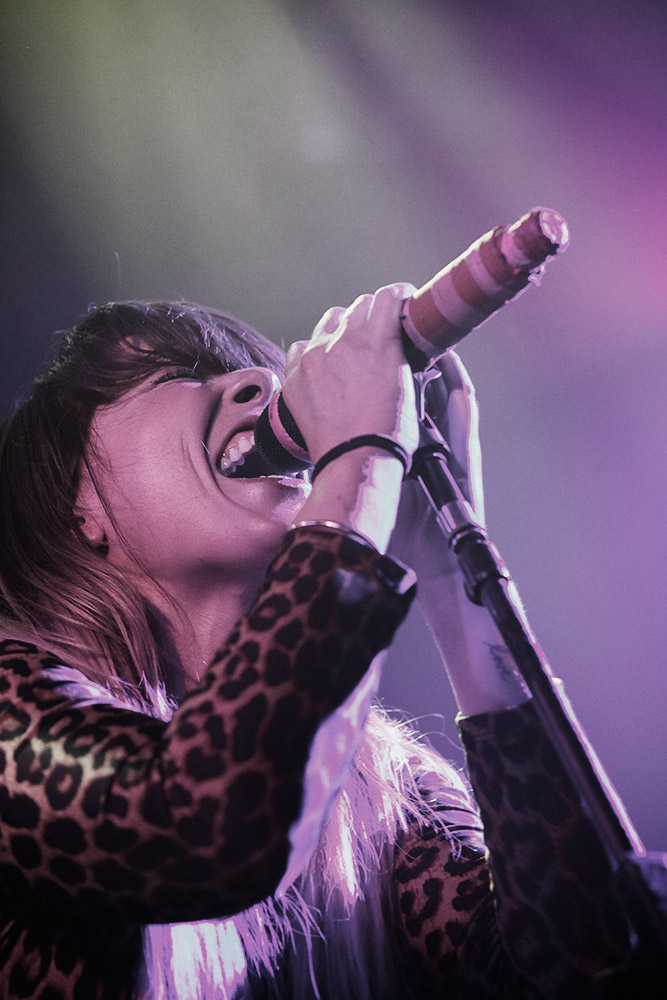
Hannah Hooper of Grouplove performing live at The Troubadour in Los Angeles on September 17, 2013

On April 22, 2014, Sean Gadd tweeted, "Thanks for all the love. Grouplove is family and still my favorite band. Sending love. GROUP", leaving his status with the band up in the air. He has posted a song on YouTube called "Dream With Me". On June 19, 2014, Sean Gadd tweeted a series of tweets about his status in the band, the last one officially confirmed his leaving of the band, "I'm so sorry I made a big mistake. I'm making an announcement of why I'm leaving grouplove forever x." This was followed by a post on the band's website officially announcing his departure.

The band played at several festivals in 2014, including Bonnaroo, Lollapalooza, Firefly and Coachella, and will headline the Honda Civic tour in late August/early September, supported by Portugal. The Man. While on tour that year, they performed a cover of Beyoncé's hit single, "Drunk In Love".

In 2014, Grouplove released I'm With You, a short form tour documentary about the band. The documentary featured performances from the New York Seesaw Tour shows and a digital album of six songs is set for release by Atlantic.

The band contributed the original song "Let Me In", to the soundtrack for the movie The Fault In Our Stars. They also contributed an original song, "Everyone's Gonna Get High", to an episode of the second season of the HBO series Girls; and another song, "Underground", to the 2012 Tim Burton movie Frankenweenie. In 2014, they provided the end title song for the Netflix original series BoJack Horseman and the song "No Drama Queen" for Paper Towns.

=== Big Mess and Little Mess (2016–2019) ===
Grouplove released their third studio album, Big Mess, on September 9, 2016. On July 15, 2016, the band released the lead single from the album, "Welcome to Your Life". The band also announced a world tour which began in August 2016.

On April 22, 2017, Grouplove released an EP titled Little Mess. The EP was an extension of their full-length album Big Mess and it came with songs "Tell Me a Story", "Torso", "MRI", "Enlighten Me (Live)", and "Adios Amigos".

Grouplove donated $1 from every ticket sale of their 'Big Mess' world tour and raised $40,387 for charity: water. On May 9, it was confirmed that, alongside K.Flay, the band would be a supporting act for Imagine Dragons' Evolve Tour, in support of their third studio album Evolve. Noticeably, drummer Ryan Rabin was missing from the lineup on this tour, with Benjamin Homola filling in on drums. In an email to band frontman Christian Zucconi, Rabin explained, "I'm not saying I don't want to be in the band anymore but I don't want to go on the tour."

=== Healer, This Is This and I Want It All Right Now (2020–present) ===
On January 8, 2020, Grouplove released the single "Deleter", the band's first release since the re-release of Big Mess in 2017. A music video, directed by Chris Blauvelt, was also released, and the band revealed that "Deleter" would be the lead single off of an upcoming fourth album. The album's title was later revealed to be Healer, along with a North American tour announcement. A video for "Youth" was released two weeks prior to the album. It again teamed them with director Christopher Blauvelt and stars Grace Zabriskie, a personal friend of the band. In a press release for Healer, Benjamin Homola was listed as the band's new drummer. Ahead of the tour, the band was certified climate positive by the United Nations, the first band in the United States to gain the certification. On March 10, 2021, Grouplove released the single "Deadline" along with a music video for the song. The band also made the surprise announcement that their fifth studio album, This Is This, would be released two days later on March 12, 2021. On March 23, 2023, the band announced that their sixth album, I Want It All Right Now, would be released on July 7, 2023. The album was preceded by the singles and music videos for "Hello", "All" (which were combined into one music video titled "Hello, All!"), "Francine" and "Eyes".

=== Chart success ===
Grouplove's first single, "Colours", reached number 15 on Modern Rock charts. It was also featured in Madden NFL 12, FIFA 12, and MLB 2K12. The song was also offered as a free download on iTunes for the week beginning September 12, 2011.

In November 2011, the band's second single "Tongue Tied" appeared in an iPod Touch commercial. The song steadily grew in popularity, and, after 26 consecutive weeks on the Modern Rock radio chart, hit No. 1 in June 2012. "Tongue Tied" has been RIAA certified Platinum and sold over 1,000,000 singles to date in the US, and has gone gold in Australia and Canada too. "Tongue Tied" was also used and performed by the cast of Fox's Glee in a May episode of the series, and also featured in a Coca-Cola advertisement. It also appears in the Gameloft racing game GT Racing 2: The Real Car Experience. Later it was used in the movies Blended with Adam Sandler, and Project Almanac. The song made a quick comeback in the 2024 coming-of-age film "You Are So Not Invited to My Bat Mitzvah," produced by Sandler, where Sadie Sandler covers 7 seconds of it. In the voting for Australia's Hottest 100 presented by Triple J, "Tongue Tied" was voted #16th and "Itchin' on a Photograph" at No. 43 best songs of 2012.

The third single off of Never Trust a Happy Song, "Itchin' on a Photograph" went to top 10 at Modern Rock radio. "Itchin' on a Photograph" was featured on the NASCAR The Game: Inside Line soundtrack.

"Ways To Go" the lead single from their 2013 sophomore album Spreading Rumours, reached number 2 on Billboard's Alternative Songs chart and number 8 on the Rock Airplay chart. In 2014, "Shark Attack" went Top 20 on Alternative Songs reaching number 20.

"Welcome To Your Life", the lead single from their third LP, Big Mess, reached the Top 5 on Billboard's Alternative Songs chart at number 5.

The FIFA video game series has also featured "I'm With You" in FIFA 14 and "Don't Stop Making it Happen" in FIFA 17.

"Deleter" was featured in MLB The Show 20.

== Band members ==
=== Current members ===
- Christian Zucconi – lead vocals, rhythm guitar, piano (2009–present)
- Hannah Hooper – lead vocals, keyboards, auxiliary percussion (2009–present)
- Andrew Wessen – lead guitar, backing and occasional lead vocals (2009–present)
- Daniel Gleason – bass (2014–present)
- Benjamin Homola – drums, percussion (2017–present)

=== Former members ===
- Sean Gadd – bass, backing and occasional lead vocals (2009–2014)
- Ryan Rabin – drums, percussion (2009–2017)

== Discography ==
=== Studio albums ===
List of studio albums, with selected chart positions, sales figures and certifications
Title	Album details	Peak chart positions					Sales	Certifications
Title	Album details	US	US Alt.	US Rock	AUS	JPN	Sales	Certifications
Never Trust a Happy Song	Released: September 5, 2011; Label: Canvasback/Atlantic	75	17	25	21	111		RIAA: Gold
Spreading Rumours	Released: September 17, 2013; Label: Canvasback/Atlantic	21	5	7	18	141	US: 80,000	
Big Mess	Released: September 9, 2016; Label: Canvasback/Atlantic	40	13	15	20	—		
Healer	Released: March 13, 2020; Label: Canvasback/Atlantic	94	5	10	—	—		
This Is This	Released: March 12, 2021; Label: Canvasback/Atlantic	— (Note: This Is This did not enter the US Billboard 200, but peaked at number 81 on the US Top Current Albums Chart.)	—	—	—	—		
I Want It All Right Now	Released: July 7, 2023; Label: Glassnote Records	— (Note: I Want It All Right Now did not enter the US Billboard 200, but peaked at number 54 on the US Top Current Albums Chart.)	—	—	—	—		
"—" denotes a release that did not chart or was not released in that territory.

=== EPs ===
List of EPs, with selected chart positions
Title	EP details	Peak chart positions
Title	EP details	AUS Phys.
Grouplove	Released: September 26, 2010; Label: Canvasback/Atlantic; Format: CD, digital download	5
Under the Covers	Released: April 18, 2015; Label: Canvasback/Atlantic; Format: 10"; Record Store Day exclusive	—
Little Mess	Released: April 22, 2017; Label: Canvasback/Atlantic; Format: 12", digital download; Record Store Day exclusive	—
"—" denotes a release that did not chart or was not released in that territory.

=== Singles ===
List of singles, with selected chart positions and certifications, showing year released and album name
Title	Year	Peak chart positions										Certifications	Album
Title	Year	US	US Rock	AUS	CAN	CAN Rock	CZ	JPN	MEX	SCO	UK	Certifications	Album
"Colours"	2011	—	29	—	—	50	—	—	20	—	—	RIAA: Gold	Never Trust a Happy Song
"Tongue Tied"	2011	42	3	33	90	23	47	59	42	83	84	RIAA: 5× Platinum; ARIA: Gold; BPI: Platinum; MC: Gold	Never Trust a Happy Song
"Lovely Cup"	2011	—	—	—	—	—	—	—	—	—	—		Never Trust a Happy Song
"Itchin' on a Photograph"	2012	—	30	— (Note: "Itchin' on a Photograph" did not enter the Australian ARIA Singles Chart but peaked at number five on the ARIA Hitseekers Chart.)	—	—	—	—	—	—	—		Never Trust a Happy Song
"Don't Fly Too Close to the Sun" (Note: "Don't Fly Too Close to the Sun" was released as a 7" Record Day exclusive single.)	2012	—	—	—	—	—	—	—	—	—	— (Note: "Don't Fly Too Close to the Sun" did not enter the UK Singles Chart, but peaked at number 66 on the UK Physical Singles Chart Top 100.)		Non-album singles
"Make It To Me" (with Manchester Orchestra) (Note: "Make It To Me" was released as a 12" Record Day exclusive single.)	2013	—	—	—	—	—	—	—	—	—	— (Note: "Make It To Me" did not enter the UK Singles Chart, but peaked at number 29 on the UK Physical Singles Chart Top 100.)		Non-album singles
"Ways to Go"	2013	— (Note: "Ways to Go" did not enter the Billboard Hot 100, but peaked at number 20 on the Bubbling Under Hot 100 Singles chart, which acts as an extension to the Hot 100.)	18	60	—	12	—	—	—	—	—	RIAA: Gold	Spreading Rumours
"Shark Attack"	2014	—	— (Note: "Shark Attack" did not enter the Hot Rock & Alternative Songs chart, but peaked at number 48 on the Rock & Alternative Airplay chart.)	—	—	—	—	—	—	—	—		Spreading Rumours
"I'm With You"	2014	—	—	—	—	—	—	—	—	—	—		Spreading Rumours
"Welcome to Your Life"	2016	—	24	—	—	27	—	—	—	—	—		Big Mess
"Good Morning"	2017	—	— (Note: "Good Morning" did not enter the Hot Rock & Alternative Songs chart, but peaked at number 24 on the Alternative Airplay chart.)	—	—	—	—	—	—	—	—		Big Mess
"Remember That Night"	2017	—	—	—	—	—	—	—	—	—	—		Big Mess
"Deleter"	2020	—	16	—	—	12	—	—	—	—	—		Healer
"Youth"	2020	—	—	—	—	—	—	—	—	—	—		Healer
"Inside Out"	2020	—	— (Note: "Inside Out" did not enter the Hot Rock & Alternative Songs chart, but peaked at number 33 on the Alternative Airplay chart.)	—	—	—	—	—	—	—	—		Healer
"Dancing On My Own"	2020	—	—	—	—	—	—	—	—	—	—		Non-album singles
"Broken Angel"	2020	—	—	—	—	—	—	—	—	—	—		Non-album singles
"A Grouplove Christmas"	2020	—	—	—	—	—	—	—	—	—	—		Non-album singles
"Wildflowers"	2020	—	—	—	—	—	—	—	—	—	—		Non-album singles
"Deadline"	2021	—	— (Note: "Deadline" did not enter the Hot Rock & Alternative Songs chart, but peaked at number 28 on the Alternative Airplay chart.)	—	—	—	—	—	—	—	—		This Is This
"You Oughta Know"	2021	—	—	—	—	—	—	—	—	—	—		Non-album single
"Hello"	2023	—	— (Note: "Hello" did not enter the Hot Rock & Alternative Songs chart, but peaked at number 22 on the Rock & Alternative Airplay chart.)	—	—	—	—	—	—	—	—		I Want It All Right Now
"All"	2023	—	—	—	—	—	—	—	—	—	—		I Want It All Right Now
"Francine"	2023	—	—	—	—	—	—	—	—	—	—		I Want It All Right Now
"Cheese"	2023	—	—	—	—	—	—	—	—	—	—		I Want It All Right Now
"—" denotes a recording that did not chart or was not released in that territory.

==== As featured artist ====
Title	Year	Album
"Upside Down" (Whethan featuring Grouplove)	2020	Fantasy
"Radical" (Awolnation featuring Grouplove)	2020	Non-album single

=== Other charted songs ===
Title	Year	Peak chart positions	Album
Title	Year	US Rock	Album
"Let Me In"	2014	33	The Fault in Our Stars

=== Other appearances ===
Title	Year	Album
"Underground"	2012	Frankenweenie Unleashed!
"Everyone's Gonna Get High"	2013	Girls, Vol. 1
"No Drama Queen"	2015	Paper Towns
"Back in the '90s"	2017	BoJack Horseman
"Sing A Song and Say Thank You!"	2020	Helpsters Help You
