= Rothko (club) =

Nightclub in New York City

Coordinates: 40.71894°N 73.98587°W

Rothko was a small nightclub and live music venue at 116 Suffolk St. on the Lower East Side of Manhattan, New York City. The club opened in a former textile factory in May 2004, and closed in 2006. It featured a number of acts who subsequently went on to major chart success, such as The Killers, LCD Soundsystem and Futureheads, as well as already successful groups such as Sum 41 and Jon Spencer Blues Explosion.

In March 2005 Scottish DJ Mylo performed his first US concert with a full live band.

In September of 2005, hip hop duo Cannibal Ox performed a reunion concert as part of that year's CMJ conference. The show featured almost the entire roster of the Definitive Jux record label, including label founder El-P.
