= Right Cause (disambiguation) =

Right Cause:

- Right Cause (coalition), in 1998–2000 in Russia, a liberal electoral bloc led by Boris Nemtsov, Boris Fyodorov, Irina Khakamada and Anatoly Chubais; predecessor of the Union of Right Forces
- Right Cause (newspaper), in 2001–2007 in Russia, a newspaper of the Union of Right Forces
- Right Cause (political party in Russia), a liberal conservative political party in Russia
