= Awkward Thought =

American hardcore punk band

Awkward Thought is a New York hardcore punk band that was formed in the 1990s.

== History ==
After numerous compilation appearances and two demo tapes, Awkward Thought released their first full-length album Mayday, consisting of seventeen songs, on an American label Blackout Records in 2000; the album was released by I Scream Records in Europe. Exclaim! called the album "particularly outstanding" solid and "appeal[ing]" to hardcore fans of 1980s music. Awkward Thought did a full coast-to-coast United States tour in summer 2000.

In 2001, Awkward Thought released a CD/EP titled Fear Not on Grapes of Wrath Records. Grapes of Wrath is a division of Coretex Records, which is based in Berlin, Germany. Awkward Thought toured Europe in summer 2001.

In summer 2002, Awkward Thought did a full UK tour.

Also in 2002, Awkward Thought released their second full-length CD, Ruin a Good Time, on I Scream Records in Europe, and then toured Europe in fall 2002. The Ruin A Good Time CD was released in the US in 2003 by Thorp Records. The European CD and the American CD had different artwork and layouts.
