= Claire Rosinkranz =

American singer-songwriter (born 2004)

- Rosinkranz in 2026

Background information
- Born: January 2, 2004 (age 22)
- Origin: Southern California, U.S.
- Genres: Indie pop; alt-pop; electropop
- Occupation: Singer-songwriter
- Instruments: Vocals; guitar
- Years active: 2019–present
- Labels: Republic; 10K Projects
- Website: Official website

Claire Rosinkranz (born January 2, 2004) is an American singer-songwriter from Southern California. She has been making music with her father since her youth. She had her breakthrough in 2020 with her single "Backyard Boy", which went viral on TikTok. This was followed by the release of her debut extended play Beverly Hills Boyfriend in the same year. Three years later, she released her debut studio album Just Because (2023), which has received positive reviews from critics. She followed up with My Lover, her second full-length album, which was released in 2026.

== Early life ==
Rosinkranz grew up in Agoura and Malibu. She was homeschooled in a musical family: both of her parents and her grandmothers are involved in the music industry. Her father, Regnar Rosinkranz, is an Icelandic composer, producer, and violinist. She used to help him with ideas for songs he was writing for various television shows and commercials. He would later become her closest collaborator when she started making her own music. She has spoken about growing up with synesthesia, which is when stimulation in one physical sense causes a response from another. This caused her to envision shapes and colors in response to auditory input.

Rosinkranz has been making music since she was eight years old. At the same time, she has been practicing ballet since she was three years old, which she considered her "first love". By the time she turned 11, she decided to focus more on her music career. She described herself as a perfectionist, stating that ballet's "heavily disciplined environment" had played an important role in her musical development.

== Career ==
Rosinkranz came to wide recognition when her song "Backyard Boy" went viral on the video-sharing app TikTok. The song was included on her first extended play (EP), Beverly Hills Boyfriend, which was released in 2020. A year later, Rosinkranz released her second EP, 6 of a Billion. On October 6, 2023, she released her debut album, Just Because. On October 6, 2025, she performed at her first arena concert at PHX Arena in Phoenix, Arizona as an opening act for Maroon 5's Love Is Like Tour. On February 13, 2026, her second studio album, My Lover, was released. The album featured the single "Chronic", in which she wrote about her experiences with chronic illness. She headlined a North American tour in support of the album and opened for Alex Warren on his European tour in the spring of 2026.

== Artistry ==
=== Musical style and songwriting ===
Rosinkranz's music has generally been described as indie pop, electropop, and alt-pop, with some inspirations from pop punk and funk.

Rosinkranz and her father work together to finish a song. She usually starts off by writing the whole song first, before coming into the studio and describe the song ideas to him so that he can begin working on the production. They would continue to exchange each other's ideas throughout the rest of the process. According to Rosinkranz, her father only focuses on the instrumental aspect of the music, while she would pay full attention to the lyrics. She added: "It’s nice on that level that if I’m signing about boys or whatever, he’s only looking at the music."

=== Influences ===
Rosinkranz has considered her father to be the biggest influence on her artistry. She said most of her inspiration came from watching him making music. In addition, she has cited Michael Jackson, Norah Jones, Amy Whitehouse, Sufjan Stevens, Jack Johnson, The Beatles, Frank Ocean, and Daniel Caesar as her influences, alongside her home state of California. She has expressed her love for classic songwriting, particularly from Fleetwood Mac and ABBA, where "melody carries as much weight as confession". She has also taken inspiration from classical music, which has been the soundtracks to her ballet practice sessions. In addition, she is inspired by contemporary artists such as Benee and Still Woozy.

== Personal life ==
Rosinkranz lives in Agoura Hills, California as of 2021.

== Discography ==
=== Albums ===
Title	Details
Just Because	Released: October 6, 2023; Label: Republic; Formats: digital download, LP, CD, streaming
My Lover	Released: February 13, 2026; Label: 10K Projects; Formats: digital download, streaming
"—" denotes items which were not released in that country or failed to chart.

=== Extended plays ===
Title	Details
Beverly Hills Boyfriend	Released: August 14, 2020; Label: Republic; Formats: digital download, LP, streaming
6 of a Billion	Released: July 9, 2021; Label: Republic; Formats: digital download, streaming
"—" denotes items which were not released in that country or failed to chart.

=== Singles ===
List of singles as lead artist, showing year released, selected chart positions, and originating album
Title	Year	Peak chart positions			Certifications	Album
Title	Year	IRE	NZ	UK	Certifications	Album
"Best Friend"	2019	—	—	—		Non-album singles
"Sugar Water"	2019	—	—	—		Non-album singles
"Backyard Boy" (solo or remix with Jeremy Zucker)	2020	48	—	97	BPI: Silver	Beverly Hills Boyfriend
"change ur mind" (with Sarcastic Sounds and Clinton Kane)	2021	—	— (Note: "Change Ur Mind" did not enter the NZ Top 40 Singles Chart, but peaked at number 29 on the NZ Hot Singles Chart.)	—		Non-album singles
"Real Life"	2021	—	—	—		Non-album singles
"Frankenstein"	2021	—	—	—		6 of a Billion
"Boy In a Billion"	2021	—	—	—		6 of a Billion
"don't miss me"	2021	—	—	—		The Hating Game (Original Motion Picture Soundtrack)
"i h8 that i still feel bad for u"	2022	—	—	—		Non-album singles
"stuck on us"	2022	—	—	—		Non-album singles
"i'm too pretty for this"	2022	—	—	—		Non-album singles
"123"	2022	—	—	—		Just Because
"Sad in Hawaii"	2023	—	—	—		Just Because
"Never Goes Away"	2023	—	—	—		Just Because
"Screw Time"	2023	—	—	—		Just Because
"Pools and Palm Trees"	2023	—	—	—		Just Because
"Wes Anderson"	2023	—	—	—		Just Because
"Swinging at the Stars"	2023	—	—	—		Just Because
"Lucy"	2025	—	—	—		My Lover
"Jayden"	2025	—	—	—		My Lover
"Dancer"	2025	—	—	—		My Lover
"Crazy Bitch Song"	2025	—	—	—		My Lover
"Kiss"	2025	—	—	—		My Lover
"Chronic"	2026	—	—	—		My Lover
"Just A Man"	2026	—	—	—		My Lover (Deluxe)
"Rocket"	2026	—	—	—		My Lover (Deluxe)
"—" denotes items which were not released in that country or failed to chart.
