= Never Trust a Happy Song =

Studio album by Grouplove
- Released: September 5, 2011
- Studios: Captain Cuts Studios, Los Angeles
- Genres: Alternative rock, indie pop
- Length: 46:34
- Label: Canvasback/Atlantic
- Producer: Ryan Rabin

Grouplove chronology
Grouplove (2010)	Never Trust a Happy Song (2011)	Spreading Rumours (2013)

Singles from Never Trust a Happy Song
- 1. "Colours" Released: July 7, 2011; 2. "Tongue Tied" Released: September 2, 2011; 3. "Lovely Cup" Released: November 21, 2011; 4. "Itchin' on a Photograph" Released: August 13, 2012

Never Trust a Happy Song is the debut album by American indie rock band Grouplove. It was released on September 5, 2011 through Canvasback/Atlantic Records. The album garnered a positive reception, though critics were divided on the band's musicianship and derivation of other bands. Never Trust a Happy Song peaked at number 75 on the Billboard 200 and spawned four singles: "Colours", "Tongue Tied", "Lovely Cup" and "Itchin' on a Photograph". The album received gold certification by the Recording Industry Association of America (RIAA), signifying sales of at least 500,000 copies.

== Reception ==
Professional ratings
Aggregate scores
Source	Rating
Metacritic	66/100
Review scores
Source	Rating
AllMusic	3.5/5 stars
Consequence of Sound	(C−)
Drowned in Sound	(5/10)
The Guardian	3/5 stars
MusicOMH	3/5 stars
NME	(6/10)
PopMatters	5/10 stars
Slant Magazine	3/5 stars
Spin	(7/10)
Tiny Mix Tapes	1/5 stars

Never Trust a Happy Song received generally positive reviews from music critics, but found the band too similar to bands like MGMT, Passion Pit, fun., and The Killers, in terms of lyrics and instrumentation. This included Caroline Sullivan, writing for The Guardian, who found some of the content too similar to other bands but praised the minor intricacies in tracks like "Chloe", "Spun" and "Naked Kids": "What it lacks in originality it makes up for in sweet vibes, which may not keep Grouplove going for ever [sic], but is enough for the moment." At Metacritic, which assigns a normalized rating out of 100 to reviews from mainstream critics, the album received an average score of 66, based on 14 reviews. On the positive side, AllMusic journalist Matt Colla praised the band's musicianship for being technically sound and expressive in its genre-mashing, concluding that "Ultimately, Grouplove's Never Trust a Happy Song is a cohesive if ramshackle crowd-pleaser, full of melodic double-lead vocals, handclaps, ringing electric guitars, and staccato synth parts that tips a hat to '80s dance-rock while still retaining the band's obvious love of experimental '60s folk-rock." David Menconi of Spin praised the album's production for carrying exuberant energy to match its happy-go-lucky content, saying that "For all its youthful pathos, Never Trust a Happy Song evokes pop colors bright enough to glow at tempos just short of manic -- even "Slow" doesn't stay that way for long."

Never Trust a Happy Song had some detractors. Huw Jones of Slant Magazine felt the album paled in comparison to the band's self-titled EP with adequate lyrics and shoddy song placement derailing its true strength, saying that "Never Trust a Happy Song's finer moments arrive when Grouplove is crafting sun-kissed anthems that deserve to be blared across beaches or, at least, from the speakers of any open-top car en route to the shore." Writing for musicOMH, Max Raymond noted that the tracks throughout the album flip-flop between overly schmaltzy sugar and transparent mediocrity with decent songwriting and face value quality: "On their own merits some of these tracks are classy pop songs, but there needs to be more depth and scope to Grouplove's sound if they are to look forward." Drowned in Sound's Robert Cooke felt there was moments on the album that showed the band's potential, but it was ruined by the jumbling of different genres and questionable instrumentation choices throughout the songs. The harshest review came from James Parker, who wrote for Tiny Mix Tapes; he heavily criticized the band's upbeat, sunny demeanor for being an "indie equivalent" to mainstream pop hits and said that it only catered to hipster parties, concluding that "Considering what this record's meant to be doing, then, you could reasonably argue that it does it pretty well. Except I won't. Because this is neither a vision of musical performance nor a kind of listening practice that I for one particularly want to defend."

"Tongue Tied" debuted on number 78 on the Billboard Hot 100 on December 8, 2011. It later peaked at number 42. It was also featured as the song in Apple's iPod Touch commercial "Share the fun." "Tongue Tied" achieved the number 16 position on Australian national radio station Triple J's Hottest 100 for 2011 with "Naked Kids" reaching number 95 and "Itchin' on a Photograph" coming in at number 43

== Track listing ==
All tracks are written by Grouplove (Christian Zucconi, Hannah Hooper, Sean Gadd, Andrew Wessen, and Ryan Rabin), except where noted.

No.	Title	Writer(s)	Length
1.	"Itchin' on a Photograph"		4:16
2.	"Tongue Tied"		3:38
3.	"Lovely Cup"		4:18
4.	"Colours"	Zucconi, Hooper, Gadd, Rabin	4:14
5.	"Slow"		3:38
6.	"Naked Kids"	Zucconi, Hooper, Gadd, Rabin	3:28
7.	"Spun"		3:25
8.	"Betty's a Bomb Shell"		3:34
9.	"Chloe"		3:18
10.	"Love Will Save Your Soul"		3:47
11.	"Cruel and Beautiful World"		4:03
12.	"Close Your Eyes and Count to Ten"		4:48
Total length:			46:34

French bonus track
No.	Title	Length
13.	"Je Pense Toujours a Toi"	2:22

== Personnel ==
Adapted from the album's liner notes.

Grouplove

- Christian Zucconi – lead vocals, rhythm guitar
- Hannah Hooper – lead vocals, percussion, keyboards, artwork
- Sean Gadd – bass guitar, lead vocals on "Chloe"
- Andrew Wessen – lead guitar, backing vocals, lead vocals on "Spun"
- Ryan Rabin – drums; production, recording; mixing on "Colours"

Production

- Michael H. Brauer – mixing at Electric Lady Studios (New York City)
- Ryan Gilligan – mixing assistant, ProTools engineer
- Greg Calbi – mastering at Sterling Sound (New York City)
- Ryan McMahon – assistant engineer

Imagery

- Mark Obriski – art direction, design

== Charts ==
Chart (2011–12)	Peak position
Australian Albums (ARIA)	21
US Billboard 200	75
US Top Alternative Albums (Billboard)	17
US Top Rock Albums (Billboard)	25

== Certifications ==
Region	Certification	Certified units/sales
New Zealand (RMNZ)	Gold	7,500^{‡}
United States (RIAA)	Gold	500,000^{‡}
^{‡} Sales+streaming figures based on certification alone.
