= Spreading Rumours =

Studio album by Grouplove
- Released: September 17, 2013 (US)
- Genres: Alternative rock, indie rock, indie pop, synthpop
- Length: 50:16
- Label: Canvasback/Atlantic
- Producer: Ryan Rabin

Grouplove chronology
Never Trust a Happy Song (2011)	Spreading Rumours (2013)	Big Mess (2016)

Singles from Spreading Rumours
- 1. "Ways to Go" Released: June 10, 2013; 2. "Shark Attack" Released: December 2, 2013; 3. "I'm With You" Released: 2014

Spreading Rumours is the second studio album by the indie rock band Grouplove. It was released on September 17, 2013. The lead single "Ways to Go" peaked at #2 on the US Alternative Airplay chart. Their single "I'm With You" was featured as the soundtrack in the EA Sports game, FIFA 14.

== Critical reception ==
Professional ratings
Aggregate scores
Source	Rating
Metacritic	57/100
Review scores
Source	Rating
AllMusic	4/5 stars

Critics generally thought that the album's individual songs were usually fun, but the album as a whole was criticized for being too long and not flowing well. On Metacritic, it received an average critic review score of 57 out of 100, based on reviews from 11 critics indicating "mixed or average reviews".

== Chart performance ==
The album debuted at No. 21 on the Billboard 200. and No. 7 on the Top Rock Albums charts dated October 5, 2013, selling 16,000 copies in the first week. The album has sold 80,000 copies in the US as of August 2016.

== Track listing ==
No.	Title	Length
1.	"I'm With You"	5:33
2.	"Borderlines and Aliens"	3:50
3.	"Schoolboy"	3:52
4.	"Ways to Go"	3:35
5.	"Shark Attack"	3:58
6.	"Sit Still"	4:04
7.	"Hippy Hill"	2:56
8.	"What I Know"	3:54
9.	"Didn't Have to Go"	3:44
10.	"Bitin' the Bullet"	4:08
11.	"News to Me"	3:46
12.	"Raspberry"	3:15
13.	"Save the Party"	3:31

Deluxe edition
No.	Title	Length
14.	"Girl"	4:18
15.	"Flowers"	4:14
16.	"Beans on Pizza"	2:50

== Personnel ==
- Christian Zucconi – lead vocals, guitar, piano
- Hannah Hooper – lead vocals, percussion, keyboards
- Andrew Wessen – lead guitar, backing vocals
- Sean Gadd – bass guitar, vocals on "Flowers"
- Ryan Rabin – drums, producer

== Chart positions ==
Chart (2013)	Peak position
Australian Albums (ARIA)	18
US Billboard 200	21
US Top Alternative Albums (Billboard)	5
US Top Rock Albums (Billboard)	7
