= Pagoda (disambiguation) =

A pagoda is a tiered tower with multiple eaves.

Pagoda may also refer to:

== Structures ==
- Burmese pagoda
- Japanese pagoda
- Korean pagoda
- Pagoda (Efteling), an observation tower in the Efteling amusement park in the Netherlands
- Pagoda (Reading, Pennsylvania), a novelty building in Reading, Pennsylvania
- Chinese Pagoda (Birmingham), a landmark in Birmingham, England
- Pagoda mast, a type of superstructure of the Imperial Japanese Navy ships of World War II
- GWR pagoda platform shelter a distinctive form of waiting shelter at some British train stations
- La Pagoda, the former headquarters of Laboratorios Jorba in Madrid

== Other uses ==
- The Pagoda, a 1923 German silent film
- Pagoda (band), an American rock band
  - Pagoda (album), a 2007 album by Pagoda
- Pagoda (coin), an Indian coin
- Pagoda (data structure), a priority queue implemented with a variant of a binary tree
- Pagoda Mountain, a mountain in Colorado
- Pagoda shell, a sea snail in the subfamily Columbariidae
- Pagoda top or pagoda roof Mercedes-Benz W113, nicknamed so for its distinctive roofline
- Japanese pagoda tree, a species of deciduous tree in the subfamily Faboideae
- Pagoda, a character in the film The Royal Tenenbaums
- Pagoda Snacks, an American frozen retail consumer brand under Schwan's Company featuring egg rolls and other Asian-influenced finger foods

== See also ==
- Pagode, a Brazilian music genre
