= Mónica Fernández-Aceytuno =

Spanish biologist and writer

- Born: Mónica Fernández-Aceytuno Saénz de Santa María; 4 May 1961 (age 65); Dakhla, Western Sahara
- Education: Complutense University of Madrid
- Occupations: Biologist, writer
- Known for: Science communication
- Awards: National Environmental Award (2003)
- Website: www.aceytuno.com

Mónica Fernández-Aceytuno Saénz de Santa María (born 4 May 1961) is a Spanish biologist and writer focused on public outreach on natural issues.

== Career ==
Fernández-Aceytuno was born in Dakhla, Western Sahara where her father, a military man, was assigned. Although she only spent a few years there, this time was fundamental in the formation of her character and her discovery of nature. She earned a licentiate in Biological Sciences from the Complutense University of Madrid in 1991 and began working at a laboratory. But after a few months' stay in Alaska, following in the footsteps of Félix Rodríguez de la Fuente, she decided to leave the lab and dedicate herself to outreach.

She began publishing articles in the newspaper ABC in 1997, and for the digital media outlet Republica.com in 2010. In 2007, she created her own Internet portal on which, with the sponsorship of the Aquae Foundation and the collaboration of readers, the Diccionario Aceytuno de la Naturaleza began.

In 2015, she began to make a series of videos and micro-documentaries for various media. In her works, Fernández-Aceytuno habitually conjugates and combines nature and poetry. In the same year, she also made a series of presentations on the haiku book Lógica Sencilla by her brother, real estate expert Juan Fernández-Aceytuno.

== Awards and recognitions ==
In 2003, she received the Félix Rodríguez de la Fuente de Conservación de la Naturaleza National Environmental Award for her outreach work, and in 2007 the Jaime de Foxá Literary Prize awarded by the Real Club de Monteros. One year later, in October 2008, she received the Medal of Honor for Professional Merit from the College of Forestry Engineers for her activity in the press and on the Internet. In 2016, she received the Outreach Communication award from the International Environmental Film Festival of the Canary Islands (Festival Internacional de Cine Medioambiental de Canarias, FICMEC).

== Works ==
- El viento en las hamacas, Ediciones Luca de Tena, 2004, ISBN 9788493381103
- Diccionario Aceytuno de la Naturaleza (work in progress, carried out with the collaboration of readers)
- El país de los pájaros que duermen en el aire, Espasa, 2018, ISBN 9788467051810
