= St. Mary of the Sea College, Corunna =

St. Mary of the Sea College
- Spanish: Colegio Santa María del Mar

Location
- A Coruña, Galicia; Spain
- Coordinates: 43°20′6.87″N 8°23′16.4″W

Information
- Type: Private primary and secondary school
- Religious affiliation: Catholicism
- Denomination: Jesuit
- Established: 1964; 62 years ago
- Director: Fr. Isidro González Modroño, SJ
- Headmaster: Alfonso Trillo
- Grades: K-12, including baccalaureate
- Gender: Co-educational
- Website: www.santamariadelmar.org

St. Mary of the Sea College (Spanish: Colegio Santa María del Mar) is a private Catholic primary and secondary school, located in A Coruña, in the autonomous community of Galicia, Spain. The school was founded by the Society of Jesus in 1964, and covers infant through baccalaureate.

== Overview ==
The school's building was designed by Miguel Fisac to have an unobstructed view of the sea.

The College's football U16 team came in first among 32 teams, advancing to the intercontinental final in Austria.

== See also ==
- Catholic Church in Spain
- Education in Spain
- List of Jesuit schools
