= Pagoda (album) =

Studio album by Pagoda
- Released: February 27, 2007
- Recorded: Milan
- Genre: Alternative rock, grunge, indie rock
- Length: 46:15
- Label: Ecstatic Peace!
- Producer: Ryan Donowho, Luca Amendolara

Professional ratings
Review scores
Source	Rating
Allmusic	link
NME	
Pitchfork Media	link

Pagoda is the debut album by Pagoda. It was recorded in Milan, and was released in 2007.

Following the completion of the album, band members Jamie and Indigo left the band. Luca stepped in to play bass, but has since taken the role as sound man for the 2007 European tour, and will remain Pagoda's producer. In January 2006, the band launched a tour in support of the album, which was released by Ecstatic Peace!.

== Track listing ==
All tracks written by Michael Pitt, except where noted.

1. "Lesson Learned"
2. "Amego"
3. "Fetus"
4. "Voices"
5. "Death to Birth"
6. "Botus"
7. "Sadartha"
8. "Alone"
9. "Fear Cloud" (Pitt/Ryan Donowho/Jamie Kallend/Indigo Ruth-Davis)
10. "I Do / Cellos / Song 1" (Pitt/Donowho/Kallend/Ruth-Davis)

== Personnel ==
=== Pagoda ===
- Michael Pitt – guitar, vocals
- Indigo Ruth-Davis – cello
- Jamie Kallend – bass
- Ryan Donowho – drums

=== Additional musicians ===
- Susan Highsmith – backing vocals on «Death to Birth»
- Christian Zucconi – guitar on «Death to Birth»
- Nicole Vicius – spoken word on «Death to Birth», backing vocals on «Alone»
- Jamie Bochert – backing vocals on «Alone»

=== Production ===
- Luca Amendolara – audio engineer, mixing, producer
- Hugh Pool – mixing, producer
- Ethan Donaldson – engineer
- Sarah Register – mastering
- Ken Rich – mastering

== Release history ==
Country	Date
United States	27 February 2007
United Kingdom	14 May 2007
