= Mulebone =

American blues duo

- Origin: New York City, NY
- Genres: Piedmont blues, Delta Blues, Roots
- Years active: 1996–present
- Labels: Red Tug Records, Ellipsis Arts
- Members: Hugh Pool; John Ragusa
- Website: Official Site

Mulebone is an American blues based duo of roots music specialist singer/guitarist Hugh Pool and multi-instrumentalist John Ragusa.

== Biography ==
The combo originally formed in 1996 to play at the Brotherhood of Thieves on Nantucket Island.

Their original cassette release, Mulebone was recorded on ADAT in Hugh's apartment in 1996 and sold several hundred copies on their repeated visits to Nantucket.

The group continued to perform, slowly expanding their area of operation and repertoire. In 1998 the duo took half the music that was on the original cassette, recorded five new songs and put out a CD also entitled Mulebone. This one featuring their signature laughing donkey on the cover.

In 2000 the group was noticed by Alan Pepper, owner of the New York City venue, The Bottom Line, and a run of shows at the venue began. Over the next two years Mulebone was twice featured on The Downtown Messiah, Commander Cody, The Bob's, Lena Katroukis, Al Stewart, and Al Kooper and the ReKooperators.

They were featured, along with Sweet Honey in the Rock, Maria Muldaur and David Grisman on the award winning Ellipsis Arts compilation album, American Lullaby. Their own album Mulebone, was a collection of traditionals, and charted in the Top 100 on the "Americana Roots Chart" for National radio airplay, as reported by the Album Network.

== Discography ==
=== Albums ===
- 1999 Mulebone (Red Tug Records)
- 2010 New Morning (Red Tug Records)
- 2011 Bluesville Sessions (Red Tug Records)

=== Compilation albums ===
- 2003 American Lullabye (Ellipsis Arts)
