= Poza de la Sal =

Coordinates: 42°40′N 3°30′W

- Municipality and town
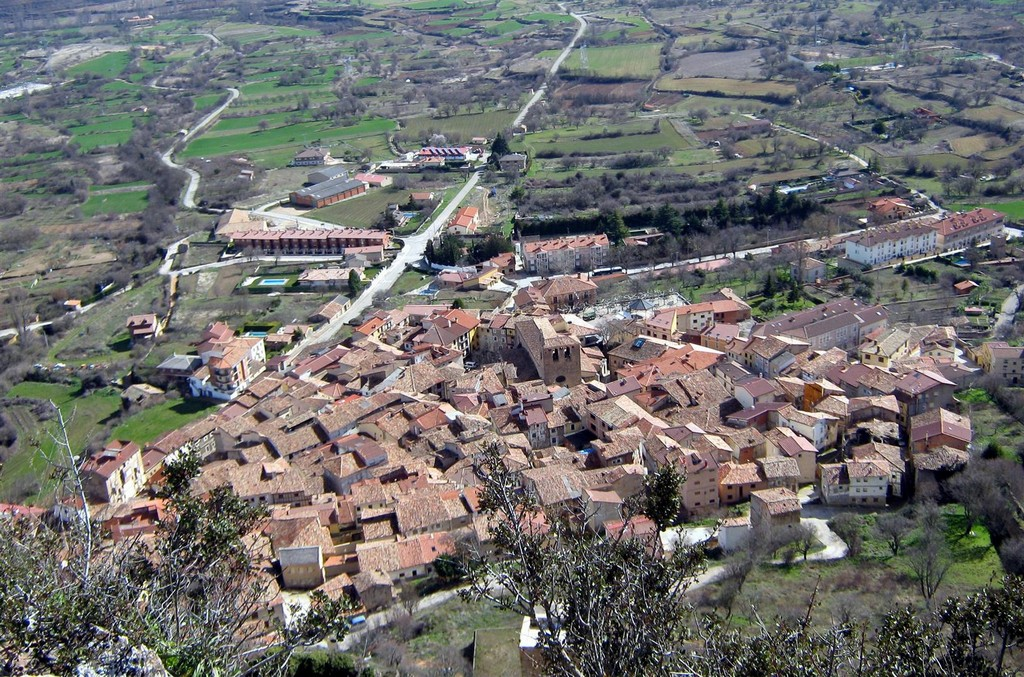
- View of Poza de la Sal from its castle
- Motto: Balcón de La Bureba ("Balcony of La Bureba")
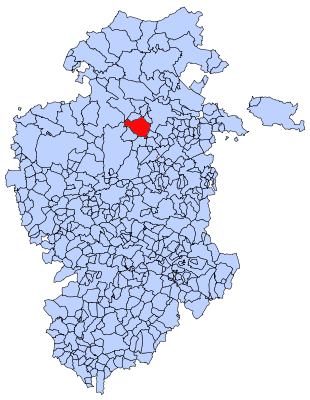
- Municipal location of Poza de la Sal in Burgos province
- Country: Spain
- Autonomous community: Castile and León
- Province: Burgos
- Comarca: La Bureba

Area
  - Total: 82 km^{2} (32 sq mi)
- Elevation: 763 m (2,503 ft)

Population (2025-01-01)
  - Total: 278
  - Density: 3.4/km^{2} (8.8/sq mi)
- Time zone: UTC+1 (CET)
  - Summer (DST): UTC+2 (CEST)
- Postal code: 09246
- Website: http://www.pozadelasal.es/ http://pozadelasal.burgos.es/

Poza de la Sal is a municipality and town located in the province of Burgos, Castile and León, Spain. According to the 2004 census (INE), the municipality has a population of 387 inhabitants.

== Main sights ==
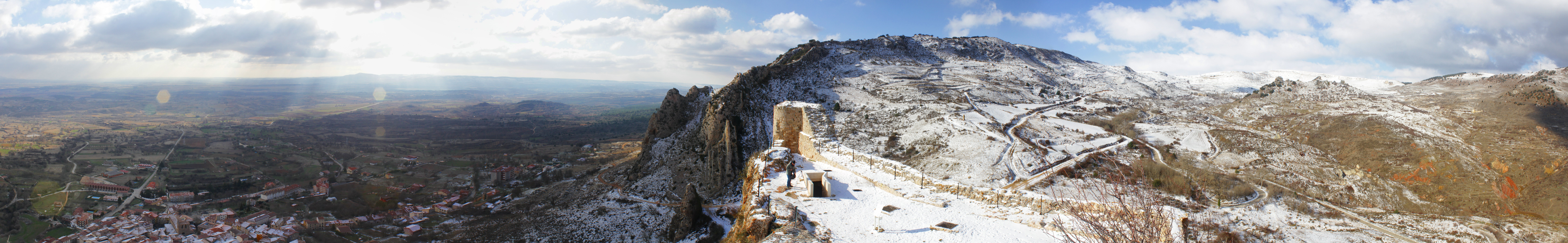
Panoramic view from Rojas castle, Poza de la Sal

- Rojas castle (9th-15th century)
- Salt evaporation ponds and Diapir - Salt extraction since the Ancient Rome times. The Diapir is the biggest one in Europe.
- San Cosme y San Damián church (14th-18th century)

== Notable residents ==
- Enrique Suñer Ordóñez – Spanish pediatrician (1878–1941)
- Félix Rodríguez de la Fuente – Spanish naturalist (1928–1980)
- Valentín de la Cruz – Spanish monk (1928–2021)
