= Black Helicopter (band) =

American hard rock band

- Origin: Boston, Massachusetts, United States
- Genres: Indie rock, garage rock, hard rock post-rock
- Years active: 2000–present
- Labels: Traktor7, Ecstatic Peace, Midriff, Limited Appeal, Geldor Records
- Members: Tim Shea; Aarne Victorine; Matt Nicholas
- Past members: Zack Lazar; Jeff Iwanicki; Mike Davis; John Keskin
- Website: https://blackhelicopter.bandcamp.com/

Black Helicopter is an American, Boston, Massachusetts-based hard rock band.

Black Helicopter has performed with Sonic Youth, Thurston Moore, Mission of Burma, Killing Joke, J. Mascis, Shellac, Archers of Loaf, Kurt Vile, deerhoof, Obits, Disappears, Fucked Up, godheadSilo, Dead Meadow, Witch, Easy Action, Harvey Milk, The Shipping News, and Sunburned Hand of the Man.

The group has received significant media coverage in the United States, especially after appearing at the 2007 SXSW. They embarked on a national tour of the US in March 2007. Their second album, Invisible Jet, has been reviewed by a number of US press outlets.

== Discography ==
- That Specific Function (Traktor 7, 2004)
- Invisible Jet (Ecstatic Peace, 2006)
- Don't Fuck With The Apocalypse (Ecstatic Peace, 2010)
- Deadlines for Deadbeats (Midriff Records, 2016)
- Everything is Forever (Limited Appeal, 2017)
- LIVE on Pipeline! @ Home (2022 Geldor Records)
