= Hugh Pool =

American musician, songwriter and producer

- Born: Hugh Eustis Pool; March 17, 1964 (age 61); Pittsburgh, Pennsylvania, United States
- Genres: Americana, roots rock, folk, blues, country
- Occupation(s): Musician, songwriter, film scorer, sound engineer, instructor, music producer
- Instrument(s): Guitar, vocals, slide guitar, lap steel, harmonica, banjo, ukulele, mandolin, electric guitar
- Years active: 1983–present
- Labels: Red Tug Records
- Website: Hugh Pool

Hugh Pool (born Hugh Eustis Potts Pool, March 17, 1964, Mars, Pennsylvania) is an American musician, songwriter, and producer who plays guitar in a unique style that melds traditional Delta blues, country music and classic and psychedelic rock and roll. His instrument of choice is a National Steel Triolian, a resonator guitar somewhat like a Dobro, played with a spark plug wrench through an Ibanez TS-9 overdrive pedal and a Dunlop Dyna comp compressor. He also plays harmonica, banjo, lap steel, mandolin, sings and plays standard electric guitars.

== Biography ==
Inspired by the album Will the Circle Be Unbroken, Neil Young, Deep Purple, Bob Dylan, The Allman Brothers and Creedence Clearwater Revival, Pool started playing the guitar at the age of 15. At the age of 20, Hugh moved to New York City and began performing in the city's subway system. During this time he frequented The Sun Mountain Cafe, The Speakeasy and Matt Uminov Guitars, where he befriended and played with Chris Whitley and John Campbell, until their respective and untimely deaths.

Pools co-performers have included Vassar Clements, Patti Smith, Government Mule, Levon Helm, Leslie West, Johnny Winter, Dave Edmunds, John Mayall, The Fabulous Thunderbirds and Canned Heat.

He has also performed on the Emeril Lagassi Show, The Mitch Albom Show, Late Night with Conan O'Brien, The City (in which he had a recurring role), and a cameo in the short-lived CBS 2006 television series, Love Monkey. His original songs have been used for television, movies, award-winning documentaries (Don't Shut Me Out) and an off Broadway play (Orphans) starring Mark Consuelos.

Hugh is also a noted recordist who has been featured in Tape Op and Mix magazines. He records and produces bands at his Brooklyn, NY studio, Excello Recording. Here he has worked with Taj Mahal, Debbie Harry, Michael Pitt, The National Kiki & Herb, Michael Brecker, Radio 4, Joseph Arthur, Susan McKeown, Marah, Sophie Auster, Matt Smith, Larry Campbell, Tony Garnier in addition to a host of others.

=== Recordings ===
In 1988 Hugh met Professor Washboard and with keyboardist Brian Mitchell formed a country blues trio called The Catfish. Over the next 5 years The Catfish busked the streets of Northern Europe, did 4 Scandinavian tours and released 3 albums. Yowzah and Delta Delight were recorded on a 4 track cassette machine in Brian Mitchell's apartment and the 3rd, Blackjack, was recorded at Rocking Chair studio in Memphis, Tennessee. These 3 releases were sold only in Europe.

His first recording as a leader, Spirits Treat Me Gently, was tracked in 1993 At Duplex Sound in the Tribeca section of Manhattan and released on Pool's own label, Red Tug Records. A second recording, Live at the Rodeo Bar, followed in 2001 with James Wormworth on drums and Whynot Jansveld on bass.

He is a founding member with John Ragusa of the blues group Mulebone, whose releases include Mulebone (recorded in 2001 at Pool's apartment), New Morning in 2010 (recorded at Excello Recording), and Bluesville Sessions in 2011 (recorded at Sirus/XM Radio in Washington,

In 2010, while continuing to tour and write with both Mulebone and The Hugh Pool Band, Hugh scored a feature-length film (The Jonestown Defense) and recorded and mixed a forthcoming DVD project for the band Pagoda.

== Discography ==
For album credits, click here

=== The Catfish ===
- Yowzah (1988)
- Delta Delight (1990)
- Blackjack (1991)

=== Hugh Pool Band ===
==== Studio albums ====
- Spirits Treat Me Gently (1993) Red Tug Records

==== Live albums ====
- Live at the Rodeo Bar (2001) Red Tug Records

==== Mulebone ====
- Mulebone (2001) Red Tug Records
- New Morning (2010) Red Tug Records
- Bluesville Sessions (2011) Red Tug Records

==== Film & TV ====
- Law & Order: Criminal Intent
- Ghost Hunters International
- Dirty Jobs
- Discovery Channel
- Don't Shut Me Out... HIV+ PArents Struggling with Exposure (1996)
- The History Channel
- Shed DVD (2005) Red Tug Records

==== Compilations ====
- Best of the Green Mountain Blues, Vol. 3 – "What I Did"
- The Greenwich Village Folk Festival: 1981-1990 (1991) - "I'll Make a Deal With You"
- Live at the Postcrypt (The 20th Anniversary Celebration) (1995) - "I Just Called You Up Brother"
- Brooklyn Above Ground (2001) - "I Forgot Where I Was"
- American Lullaby (2003) - "My Creole Belle"
- The Night Before - A New York Christmas: Past, Post, Punk, Present, Future (2002) - "Little Drummer Boy"

== Filmography ==
List of television credits
Year	Title	Role	Notes
1995	The City	Actor	Spike
2006	Love Monkey	Actor	as himself
