= Carlos Romero López =

Spanish academic (born 1946)

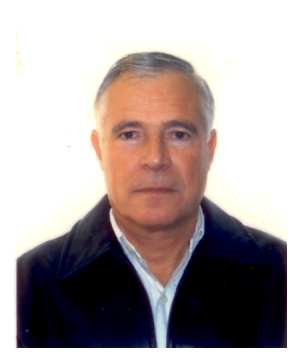

Carlos Romero (Madrid, 1946) is a Spanish academic who specializes in the field of economic optimization chiefly by using multi-criteria programming methods, concretely goal programming methods. In 2006, the International Society on Multiple Criteria Decision Making awarded him the Georg Cantor Medal.

== Career ==
Romero was born in Madrid. He has a bachelor's degree in agricultural sciences, an MS in agricultural engineering and a PhD in agricultural economics, all of them from the Technical University of Madrid, and an MS in statistics and operational research bestowed by the Universidad Complutense of Madrid. He is currently a professor of economics at the Technical University of Madrid. He was formerly professor of agricultural economics at University of Córdoba (Spain). He has been visiting professor at several universities like: Reading, Portsmouth, Wageningen, Humboldt, etc. He has given short courses and seminars in around 40 universities and research centres in more than 30 countries.

Romero is author, co-author or co-editor of 21 books and around 220 papers (around 100 of them appearing in the ISI data basis) with an optimization orientation and an interdisciplinary perspective that combines engineering, economics and applied mathematics. The research impact of his work implies an h-index of 30 (ISI data basis) and an h-index of 47 (Google Scholar).

His book Handbook of Critical Issues in Goal Programming (Pergamon Press, 1991) and his paper "Goal Programming for Decision Making" (with Mehrdad Tamiz and Dylan Jones, European Journal of Operational Research, 1998), have had and still have a strong influence in the optimization field. His monograph Multiple Criteria Analysis for Agricultural Decisions (with T. Rehman, Elsevier 1989, 2003) is a work of reference for optimizing the use of the natural resources.

== Awards and distinctions ==
- Research Award (Technical University of Madrid, 1994).
- Lucas Mallada National Economics and Environment Award (Ministry of Environment 2001).
- Distinguished Services Award (Ministry of Agriculture, Food and Fisheries 2003)
- Member of the "Euro Gold Medal" (Jerusalem, Israel, 1995).
- Georg Cantor Award bestowed by the International Society on Multiple Criteria Decision Making (Crete, Greece, June 2006).
- Selected Fellow of the Operational Research Society (2002- ).
- Elected Member of the Executive Committee of the International Society on Multiple Criteria Decision Making (2002-2006) and (2011-2015).
- Honorary Forest Engineer (Ingeniero de Montes de Honor, 2016)
- The Spaniard most cited in the area of "Operations Research & Management Science"(Thomson Reuters (ISI) and FECYT).
- Positive assessment of seven periods of research activity (1972-2013) by the Spanish National Committee of Research Assessment

== Current editorial positions ==
- Forest Science (Associate Editor).
- Journal of Multi-Criteria Decision Analysis (Area Editor).
- Operational Research: An International Journal (Editorial Board).
- International Transactions in Operational Research (Guest Editor).
- Journal of the Operational Research Society (Guest Editor)

== Books ==
A sample of Romero´s books include:

- Multiple Criteria Analysis for Agricultural Decisions (with Tahir Rehman). Elsevier.
- Handbook of Critical Issues in Goal Programming. Pergamon Press.
- Multiple Criteria Decision Making and its Applications to Economic Problems( with Enrique Ballestero). Kluwer Academic Publishers.
- Handbook of Operations Research in Natural Resources (with Andrés Weintraub, Trond Bjorndal and Rafael Epstein). Springer.
- Designing Public Policies-An Approach based on Multi-Criteria Analysis and Computable General Equilibrium Modeling (with Francisco J André and M. Alejandro Cardenete). Springer.
