= Félix Rodríguez de la Fuente =

Spanish naturalist and broadcaster (1928–1980)

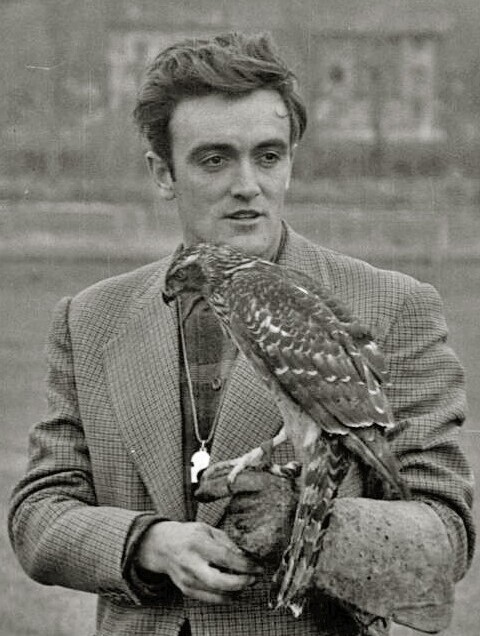
- Photographed at an exhibition in Lasarte, 1955
- Born: Félix Samuel Rodríguez de la Fuente; 14 March 1928; Poza de la Sal, Spain
- Died: 14 March 1980 (aged 52); Shaktoolik, Alaska, U.S.
- Resting place: Poza de la Sal Cemetery (1980); Burgos Cemetery (1981–present)
- Education: Valladolid University
- Occupations: Naturalist, broadcaster
- Spouse: Marcelle Geneviève Parmentier Lepied
- Children: 3

Félix Samuel Rodríguez de la Fuente (14 March 1928 – 14 March 1980) was a Spanish naturalist and broadcaster. He is best known for the highly successful and influential television series El Hombre y la Tierra (1974–1980). A graduate in medicine and self-taught in biology, he was a multifaceted charismatic figure whose influence has endured despite the passing years.

In 1960, he became one of King Saud of Arabia's personal falconers after impressing the Saudi Government with two attractive specimens on behalf of Francisco Franco, which allowed him to become popular and produce his first documentary programme, Señores del espacio (1965). His knowledge covered areas such as falconry and ethology, emphasizing the study of wolves. Rodríguez de la Fuente also served as expedition guide and photographer on safaris in Africa, lecturer and writer, and contributed greatly to environmental awareness in Spain at a time when Conservationism was unheard of in the country. He has thus been credited as "the father of environmentalism" in Spain. His impact was not only national but also international and it is estimated that his television programmes, which were broadcast in many countries, have been seen by millions.

He died in Alaska on his 52nd birthday, while shooting a documentary about the Iditarod Trail Sled Dog Race, when the Cessna 185 aircraft carrying him along with two Spanish cameramen and the American pilot crashed, killing all on board. After his death, Spanish singing duet Enrique y Ana recorded the single “Amigo Felix” (Our Friend Felix) to pay homage to Rodriguez, the song is about all the members of the Animal Kingdom grieving his death, as a representation of his love for animals and all Nature.

== Early years ==
Félix Samuel Rodríguez de la Fuente was born in Poza de la Sal, Burgos, Spain, on 14 March 1928. He was the son of Samuel Rodríguez and Marcelina de la Fuente Ibáñez. He had a younger sister, Mercedes. His father was the town notary, and avid reader and a lover of the Spanish language. His household was somewhat intellectual for a small Castilian village. He was schooled at home due to the Spanish Civil War (1936–1939) and his father's opposition to early schooling. Felix's adventures in the surrounding natural world were continuous until he was ten. He would describe his birthplace as a "human community living in harmony with the landscape" that shaped his "zoomorphic universe." This environment had a deep impact on his future sensitivity, and his anthropological and philosophical approach to his career as a naturalist.

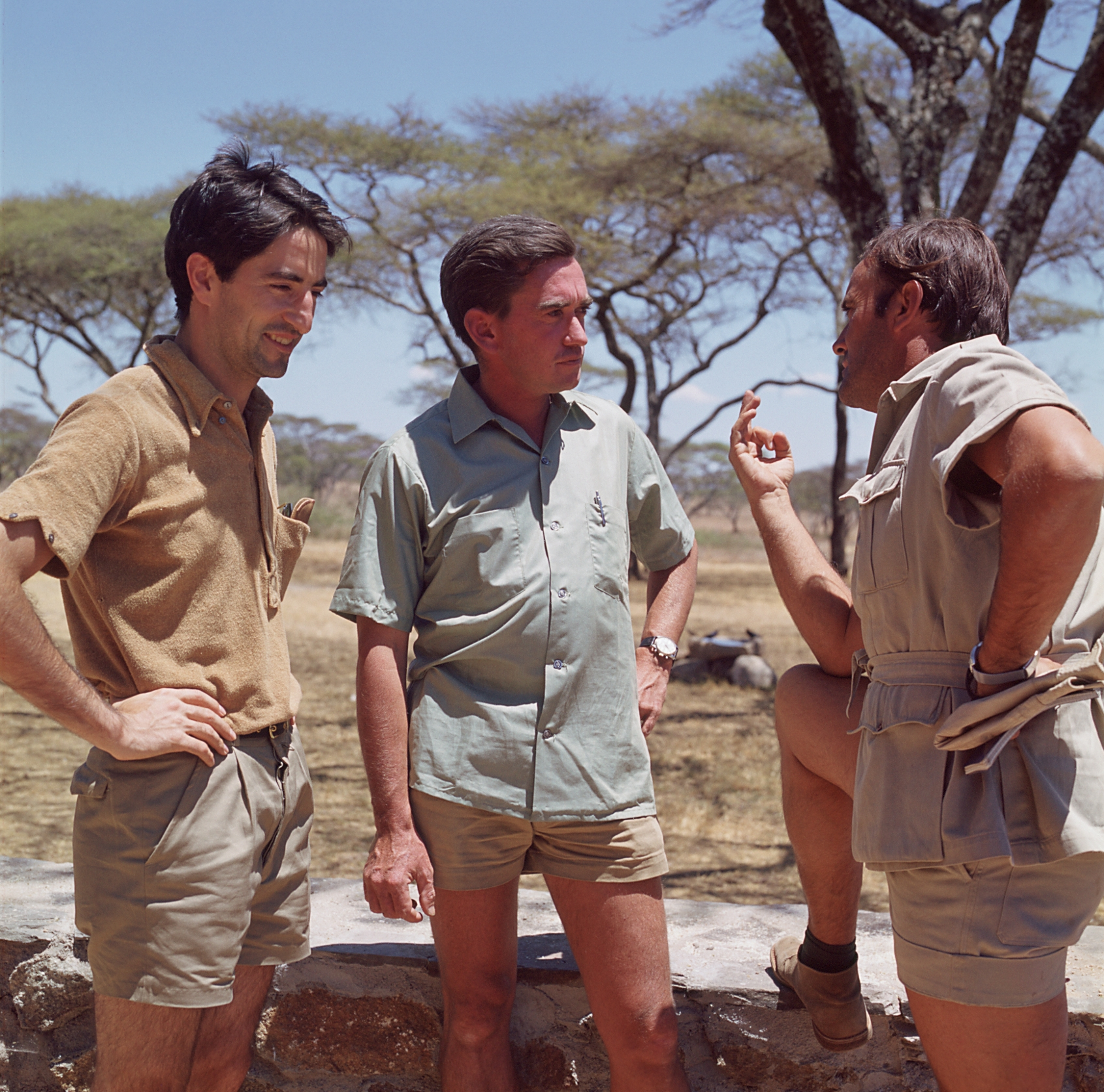
Jesús Mosterín (left), Hugo van Lawick (middle) and Félix Rodríguez de la Fuente (right) in Serengeti, Africa, 1969

He spent the summers in Santander (Cantabria, Spain), where his father was appointed as a notary. He deepened his knowledge of zoology. During a family outing he observed a falcon capturing a duck. This experience prompted his interest in falconry. He began his formal education in 1938 as a boarder at the religious school Sagrados Corazonistas de Vitoria. There, he longed for the summer and his lost freedom.

In 1946, on the advice of his father, he began studying medicine at the University of Valladolid. The first year, excited after seven years at boarding school and the leisure offered by city, he only registered for the three easiest courses and performed poorly as a student. In later years, he used to lock himself up a month before the exams in order to focus on his studies. His speaking abilities allowed him to stand out in the oral exams. He was also a university athlete, once winning the 400 metres college championship. During this year, the biologist José Antonio Valverde became very influential. Valverde gained international attention after fighting the plans of the Ministry of Agriculture to dry out the Guadalquivir marshes, which eventually led to the creation of Doñana National Park. In addition, Valverde shared his passion for falconry, which had not been practiced in Spain for over 150 years. Félix was determined to recover it. He researched treatises from the Middle Ages such as El libro de la caza de las aves by López de Ayala and El libro de la caza by Don Juan Manuel. In 1954, he was one of the signatories of the founding charter of the Spanish Ornithological Society.

In 1957, he graduated in dentistry in Madrid, receiving the Landete Arago Bernardino award, named after the pioneer of the specialty in Spain. For two years, he worked as a dentist in the clinic of Dr. Baldomero Sol in Madrid, but always part-time so that he could pursue his passion for falconry. However, after his father's death in 1960, he abandoned dentistry to pursue falconry and science journalism. In 1961 he was a consultant for the film The Cid, shot in Spain. In 1964, thanks to his growing international contacts with scientists, Rodríguez de la Fuente presented a study on the then state of peregrine falcons in Spain at the International Congress for the Protection of Birds of Prey held in Caen, France. That year, he also published his first book, The Art of Falconry.

== Career ==
Between 1970 and 1974, his first documentary series, Planeta Azul, would gain him public acclaim, especially in Spanish-speaking countries. In December 1973, he began his Radio Nacional de España radio series, La Aventura de la Vida, which was broadcast every Thursday for seven years amounting to over 350 episodes. He frequently contributed to the programmes Planeta agua and Objetivo: salvar la naturaleza. During these years, he took up a number of conservationist causes. He initiated a campaign for the rescue of animals under the threat of extinction, most notably the wolf, which probably owes its survival in the Iberian peninsula to him. Wolves are now extinct in most countries in Western Europe; the remaining populations in central Spain struggled for survival. His work inspired appreciation and respect for the wolf, but at the cost of confrontation with shepherds and hunters. He also campaigned for the protection of the brown bear, the lynx, the golden eagle and the imperial eagle and sought to preserve various Spanish habitats such as the dunes of El Saler, the Doñana National Park, the Tablas de Daimiel National Park, the Monte de El Pardo, and the Gallocanta lake. Throughout the 1970s he undertook various publishing projects such as the Wildlife Salvat Encyclopedia (1970–1973) compiled by a team of young biologists including Miguel Delibes de Castro, Javier Castroviejo, Cosme Carlos Morillo, and Vallecillo, among others. Completing weekly 24-page booklets of the encyclopedia was a challenge which lasted three years. In Spain, the encyclopaedia sold eighteen million volumes. It was subsequently translated into fourteen languages and published in five continents, becoming a major reference work - Delibes recalled years later finding the encyclopedia among the shelves of museums of natural sciences throughout Europe. Rodríguez de la Fuente also published the Salvat Encyclopedia of the Iberian and European Fauna coordinated by Joaquín Araujo, and the books El Hombre y la Tierra, Los cuadernos de campo, as well as the encyclopedia, La Aventura de la Vida, published posthumously.

=== El Hombre y la Tierra ===
Between 1973 and 1980 he created his most famous documentary series, El Hombre y la Tierra (Spanish for The Man and the Earth) which was divided into three parts: the Iberian, South American, and North American series. The Iberian series consisted of three parts and an unfinished fourth part. The South American series was filmed in 1973 in Venezuela in the Llanos, Orinoco, and Amazon basins. Originally conceived as an eight-episode production, enough material was filmed for eighteen episodes. Unfortunately, only the episodes of Canada and Alaska of the American series were filmed due to his premature death. The complete series included 124 episodes, most of them shot in Spain. They used 35 mm film, which posed significant logistic and technical challenges at the time. The series gained international recognition. Its memorable soundtrack composed by Antón García Abril soon became recognizable to all. Notable accomplishments of the series included the filming of species for the first time, such as the Pyrenean desman. Using imprinted animals that had become accustomed to human presence, but retained their natural behavioral patterns, his team filmed stunning images. Among them, wolf hunting sequences and the golden eagle capturing a mouflon are notorious. The sequences shot with wolves required him to become a member of the pack during the imprinting process. The series was broadcast in many countries gaining large audiences. In Spain, it was awarded (Premio Ondas, Antena de Oro) and internationally (Monte Carlo Television Festival). It is noteworthy that the episodes did not include a pre-filming script: Felix improvised the development of each chapter. In April 1980, the city of Burgos awarded him the Gold Medal of the City posthumously.

== Death ==
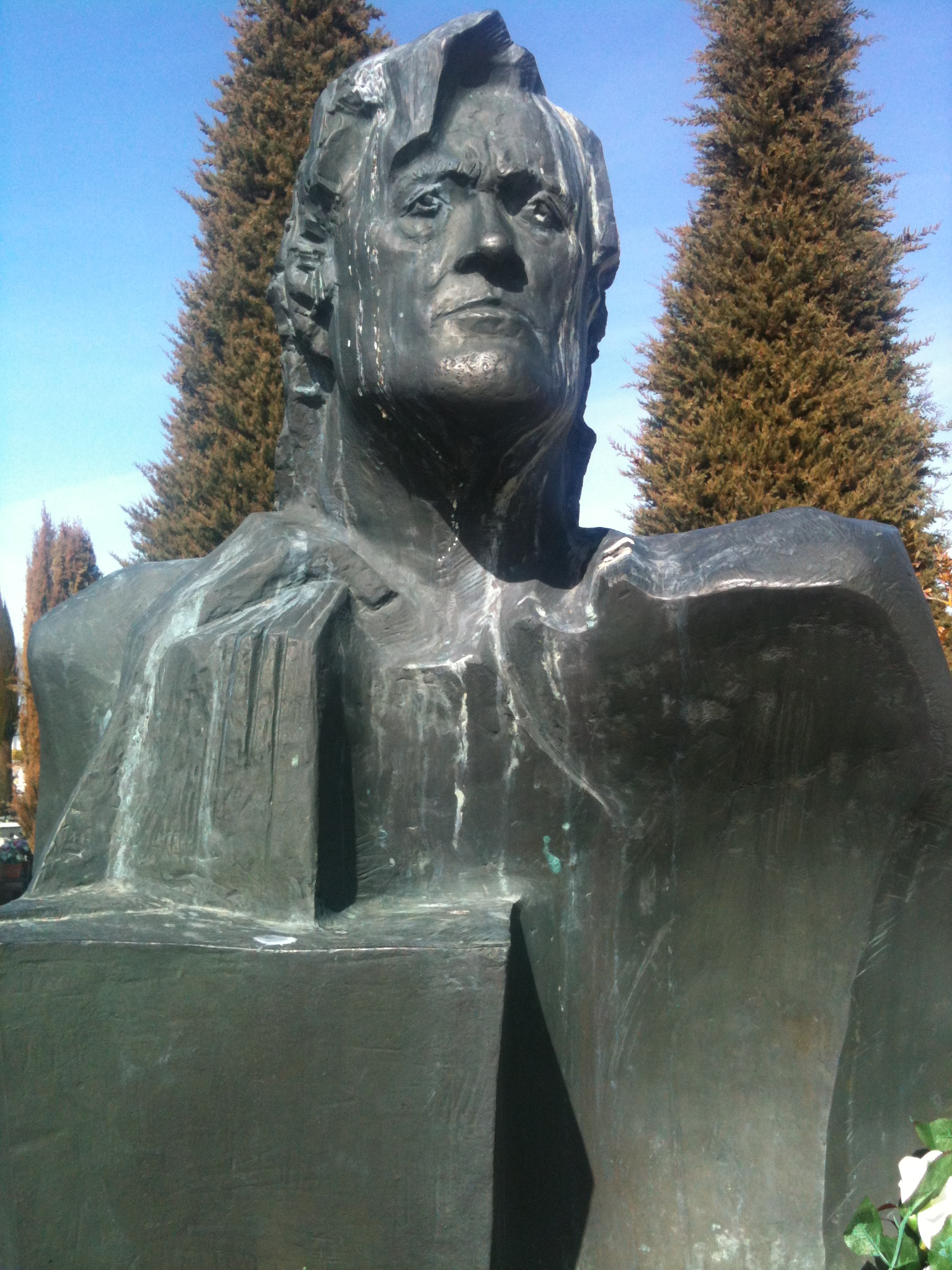
Monument to Felix Rodriguez de la Fuente at the San José cemetery, Burgos, Spain. Sculpture by Pablo Serrano

On 4 March 1980, Félix presented in the Centro Cultural de la Villa in Madrid a document entitled Global Strategy for the Protection of Biodiversity and Sustainable Growth issued by the International Union for Conservation of Nature before the king and queen of Spain as special guests. He flew to Alaska on the 10th along with the film crew of El hombre y la tierra to cover the Iditarod Trail Sled Dog Race. The team hired pilot Tony Oney and his partner Warren "Ace" Dodson. Most of the team travelled in Oney's small Cessna. Oney's plane sustained a small oil leak. Felix, who was afraid of flying, decided only at the last minute to fly in Dodson's aircraft. Shortly before take off he commented "what a beautiful place to die." After taking off from Unalakleet, the two planes initiated a route toward the Pacific coast. After a short while, one of the ski boots of Dodson's plane came loose causing the plane to become unbalanced and to crash. Because of insufficient altitude, the experienced pilot was unable to steady the plane. All passengers, including Televisión Española cameraman Teodoro Roa and the assistant Alberto Mariano Huéscar, died in the accident. Oney landed nearby and was the first to reach the site of the crash. The exact location of the tragedy was Shaktoolik, an Inuit settlement about 25 kilometers from the coast of the Bering Sea, not far from Nome, Alaska. This area had long lived in Felix's imagination since his readings of Jack London as a teenager.

Alaska police recovered the bodies, which were then deposited in the morgue at Nome to be repatriated to Spain shortly after. Rodríguez de la Fuente had been slightly ill earlier that week as a result of a painful toothache, but twelve hours before his death he was in good health and making plans for two new films: one on the albatross of Cordova, Alaska, and another on the Aleutian Islands.

While in North America, Rodríguez de la Fuente and his team had become popular in the Canadian Yukon: in Dawson City, Whitehorse, and Yellowknife; and in Alaska: in Nome, Anchorage, and Fairbanks. The headline of one of the local newspaper read: "Farewell to the Spanish Jack London."

According to the American register of aviation accidents, the crash took place at 12:30 Alaska local time on 14 March 1980, which was Rodríguez's 52nd birthday. News of the accident was released in Spain a few hours later, early in the morning of 15 March. His death shocked the country.

Felix was buried in the cemetery of his hometown of Poza de la Sal (Burgos, Spain) with thousands in attendance. In June 1981, at the request of his widow, Marcelle Parmentier, his remains were exhumed and transferred to Burgos cemetery. The pantheon was designed by architect Miguel Fisac and sculptor Pablo Serrano. The controversial transfer was made at night to prevent confronting the inhabitants and authorities of Poza de la Sal who wished his remains to stay at his birthplace.

== Legacy ==
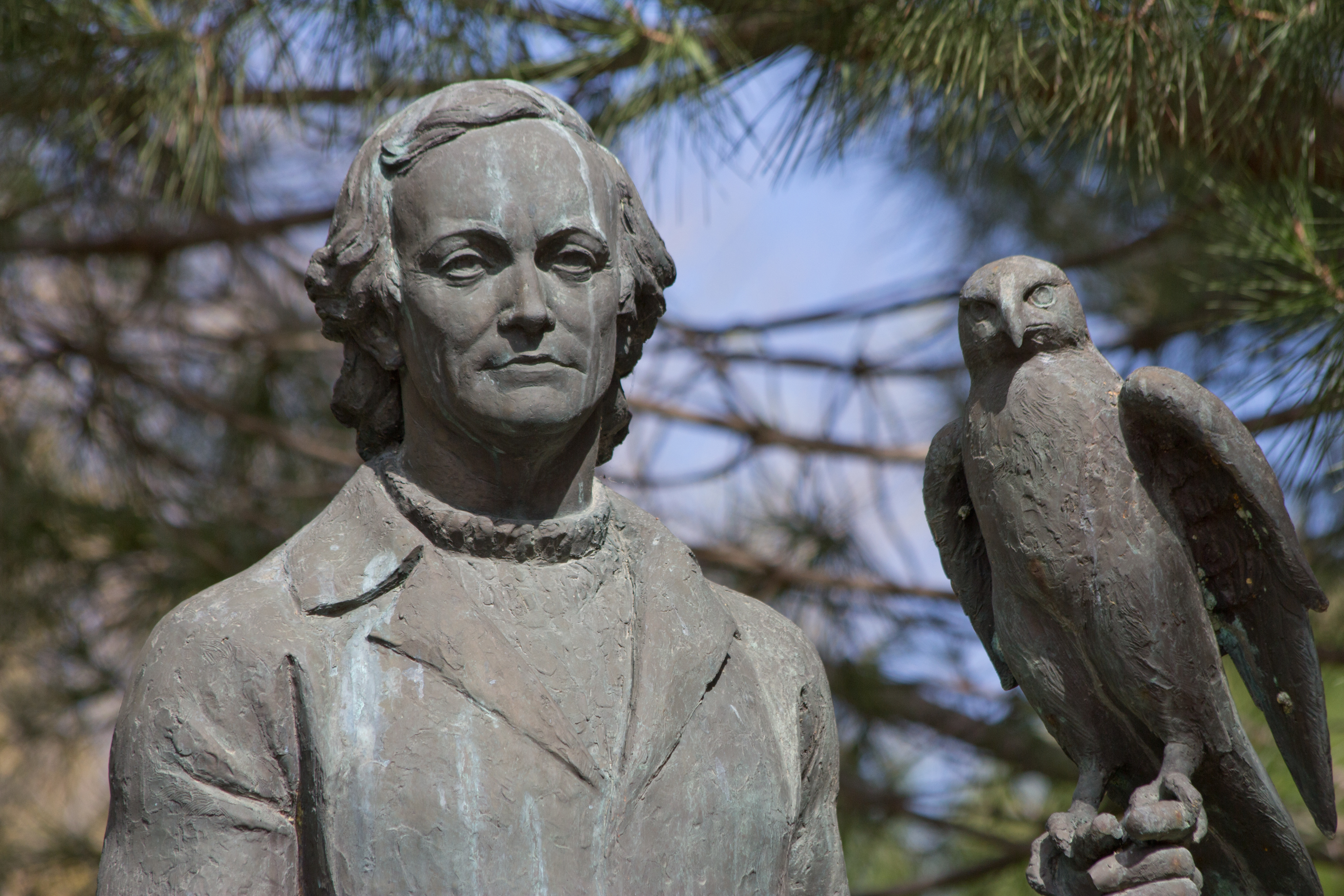
Monument to Félix Rodríguez de la Fuente at the Madrid Zoo

=== Comic strip ===
At the height of his popularity, in 1970, Carlos Guirado made an educational celebrity comic starring De La Fuente, titled Una aventura con Félix, el amigo de los animales. It was published in Super Pulgarcito.

=== Philosophy ===
Felix's philosophy was founded in an evolutionary view of living organisms. Through evolution, species adapt and improve, but also gain in beauty, which he claimed was a byproduct of evolutionary fitness. However, he thought that the optimal fitness of humans had passed. Felix believed that the ideal epoch of humanity was the Hunter-gatherer culture during the Magdalenian era (Upper Palaeolithic, 15,000 years ago). During this period humans achieved great ecological and cultural success, while living harmoniously with nature. He believed that "the Neolithic initiated a culture of abuse and subjugation that continues to this day." He proposed to recover cultural elements from our Paleolithic past: behaviors that lie at the core of our species and that we crave for.

Inspired by authors such as Teilhard de Chardin and Remy Chauvin, Rodríguez de la Fuente came to conceive of a future in which humans lived in harmony with nature and themselves. The development of collective thinking and creativity, the prioritization of the individual's leisure time to promote self-development, and the promotion of an appreciation for nature were keystones in his philosophy.

His philosophy could be labelled as a form of vitalist humanism aimed at generating healthy individuals engaged in a continuous improvement of society. Felix emphasized that a generalized appreciation for nature requires an accurate reconstruction and awareness of natural history. Felix believed that modern individualism is detrimental to the development of cooperative patterns of behavior, which would only be possible in small communities of 5,000 individuals or less.

He was well aware of the catastrophic prospects of a civilization resting upon individual achievement, eternal economic growth, and destruction of the environment. Felix had a deep appreciation for scientific research. He hoped that science would eventually lead to cultural evolution and yield the fruits of animistic thought: man and nature understood as a single living community.

This philosophy provides some context to his interest in falconry: a form of hunting not involving deception, or supreme advantage over nature (cf., fire arms hunting).

=== Rodríguez de la Fuente Foundation ===
Starting in 2004 the foundation that bears his name has taken on the challenge to disseminate Rodríguez de la Fuente's legacy. The foundation promotes a number of conservation initiatives. Their mission statement is "to promote awareness and social involvement to create positive changes that encourage a more harmonious relation between 'man and earth'" The current president is Rodriguez de la Fuente's widow, Marcelle Parmentier. Their three daughters Odille, Leticia, and María de las Mercedes are members of the board of directors.

=== Award and tribute ===
From 1986 to 2009, Spain's Ministry of Environment gave the Felix Rodríguez de la Fuente Award for Natural Conservation to recognize ecological contributions by individuals and organizations.

=== Norwegian Air Shuttle ===
As of June 2018, Rodríguez de la Fuente is one of the faces of Scandinavian airline Norwegian, where his face is remembered in the tail of two planes of the company. According to the airline, "Félix Rodríguez de la Fuente was the ultimate environmental promoter in the Spain of his time, and his role was key in creating a clear ecological conscience in the country, at a time when words such as ecology or conservationism were almost unknown."

== Gallery ==
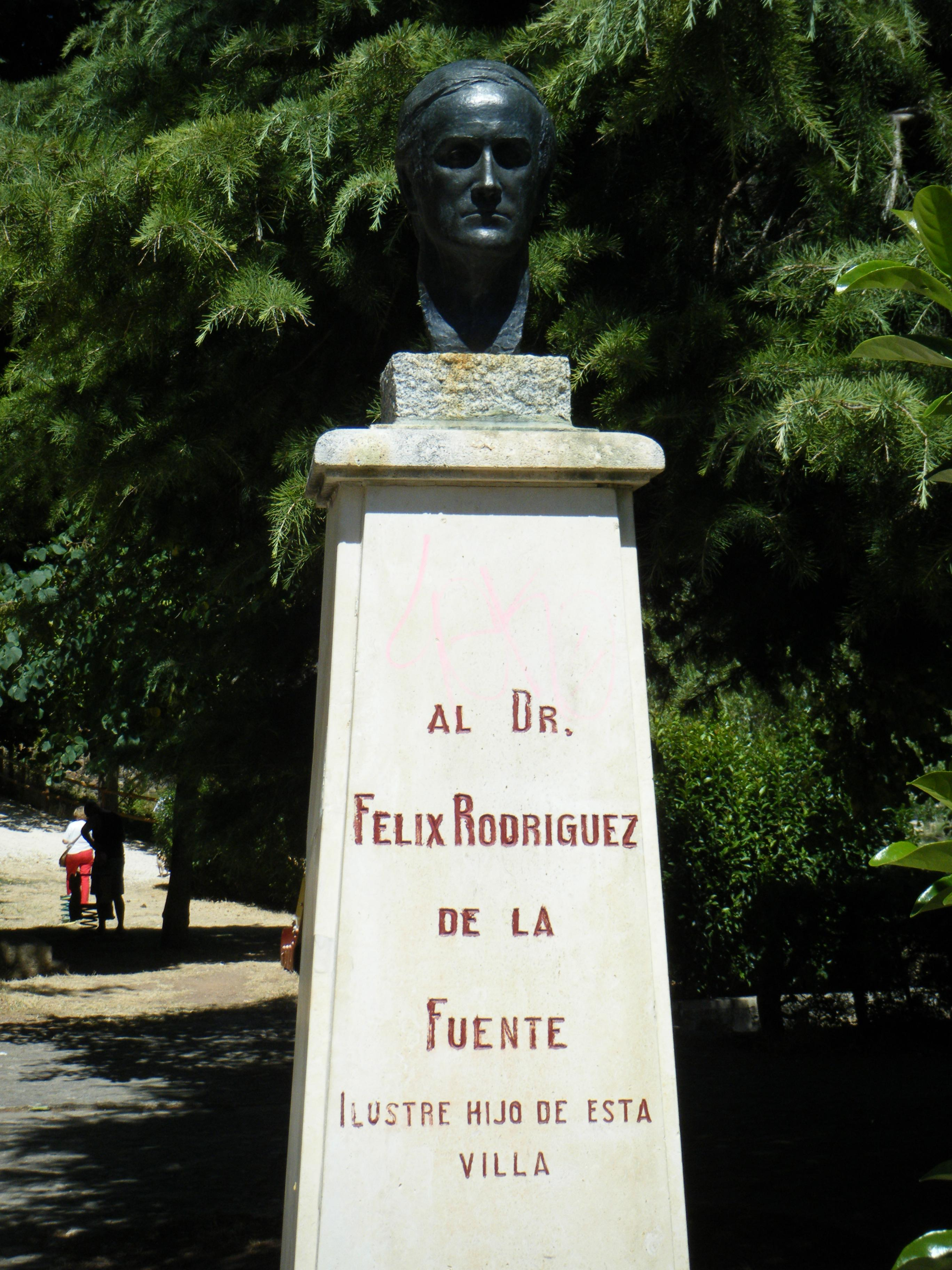
Félix Rodríguez de la Fuente monument in his hometown of Poza de la Sal, province of Burgos

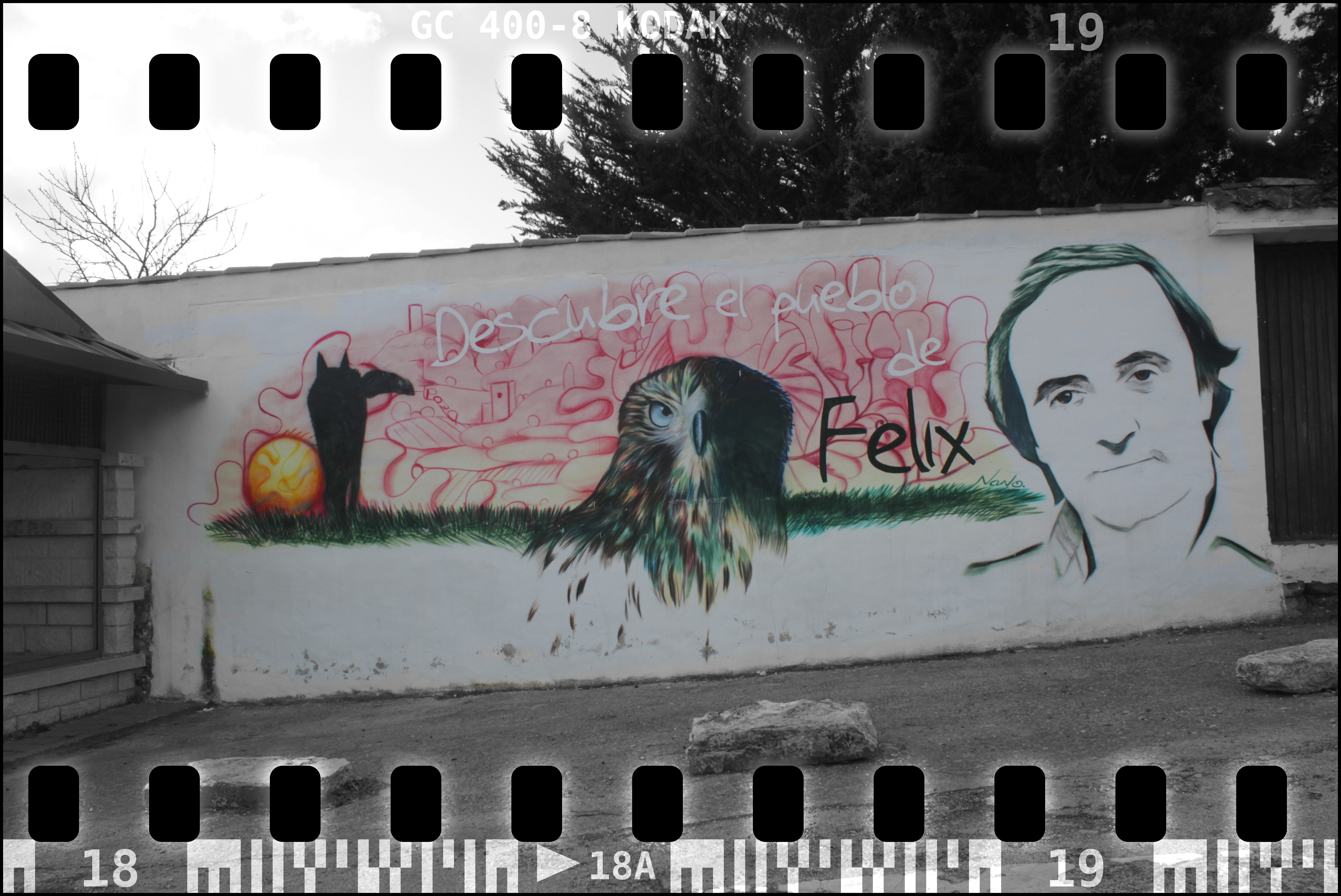
Félix Rodríguez de la Fuente graffiti in Poza de la Sal

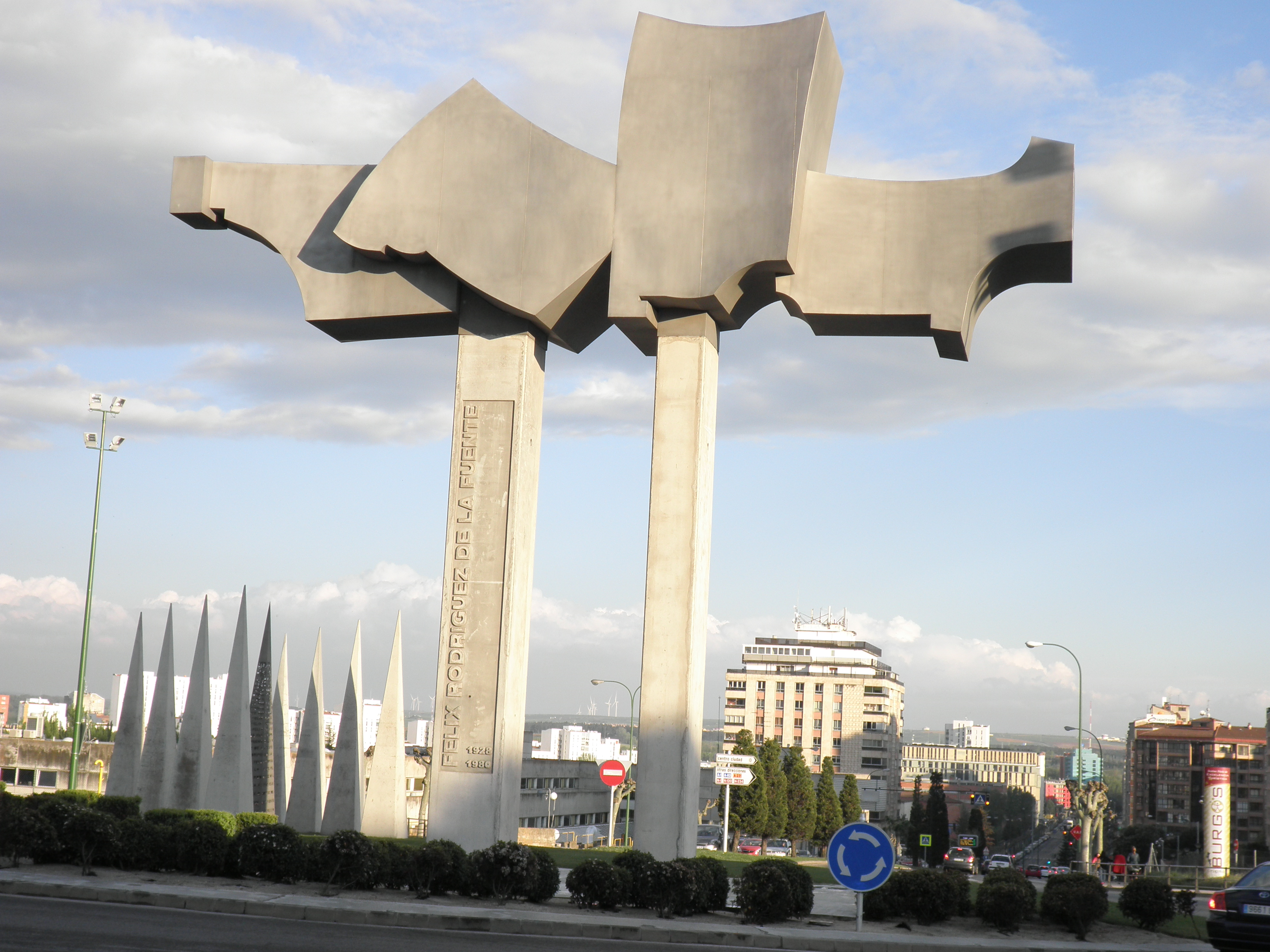
Félix Rodríguez de la Fuente monument in Burgos

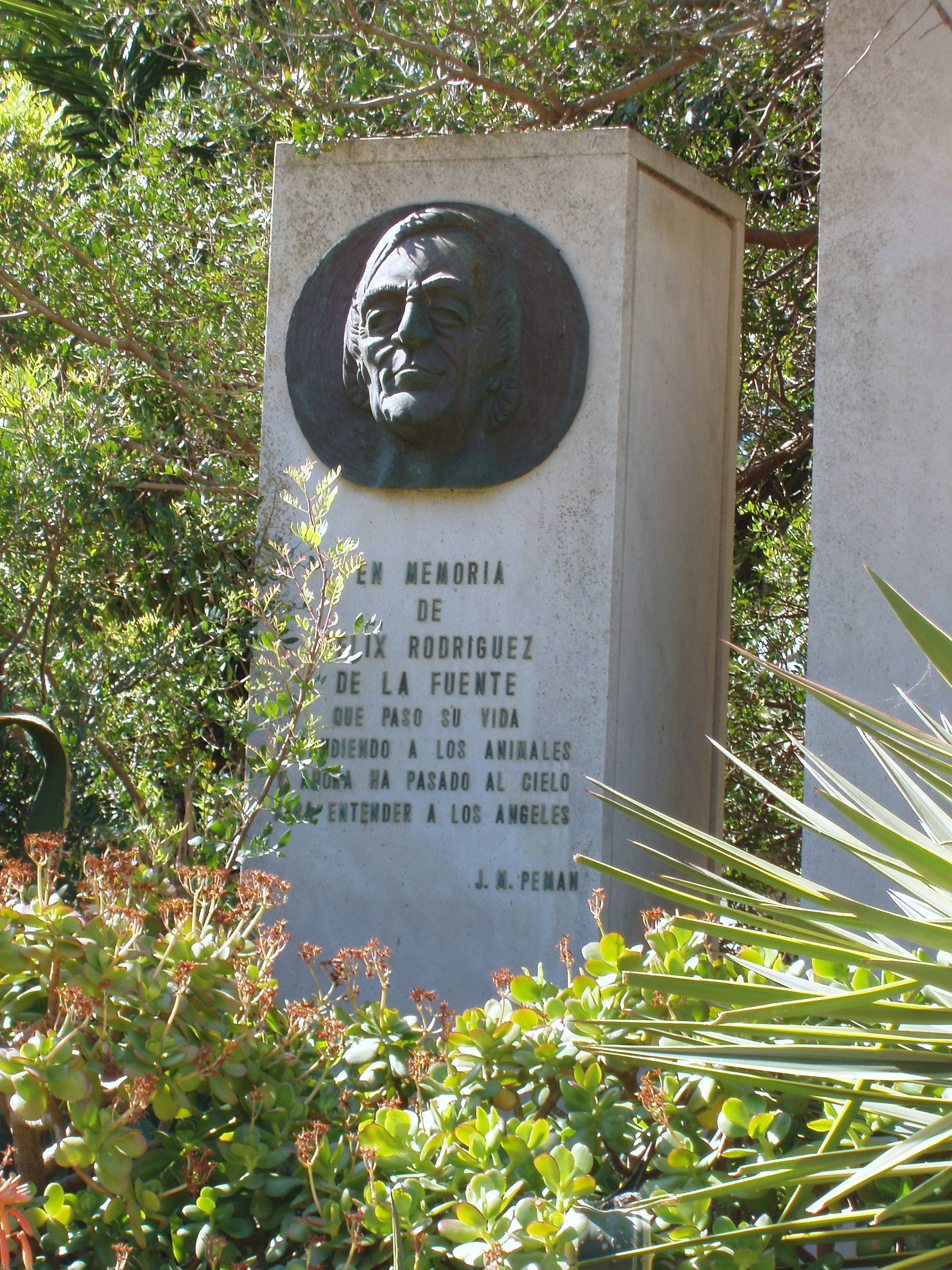
Félix Rodríguez de la Fuente monument in Cádiz

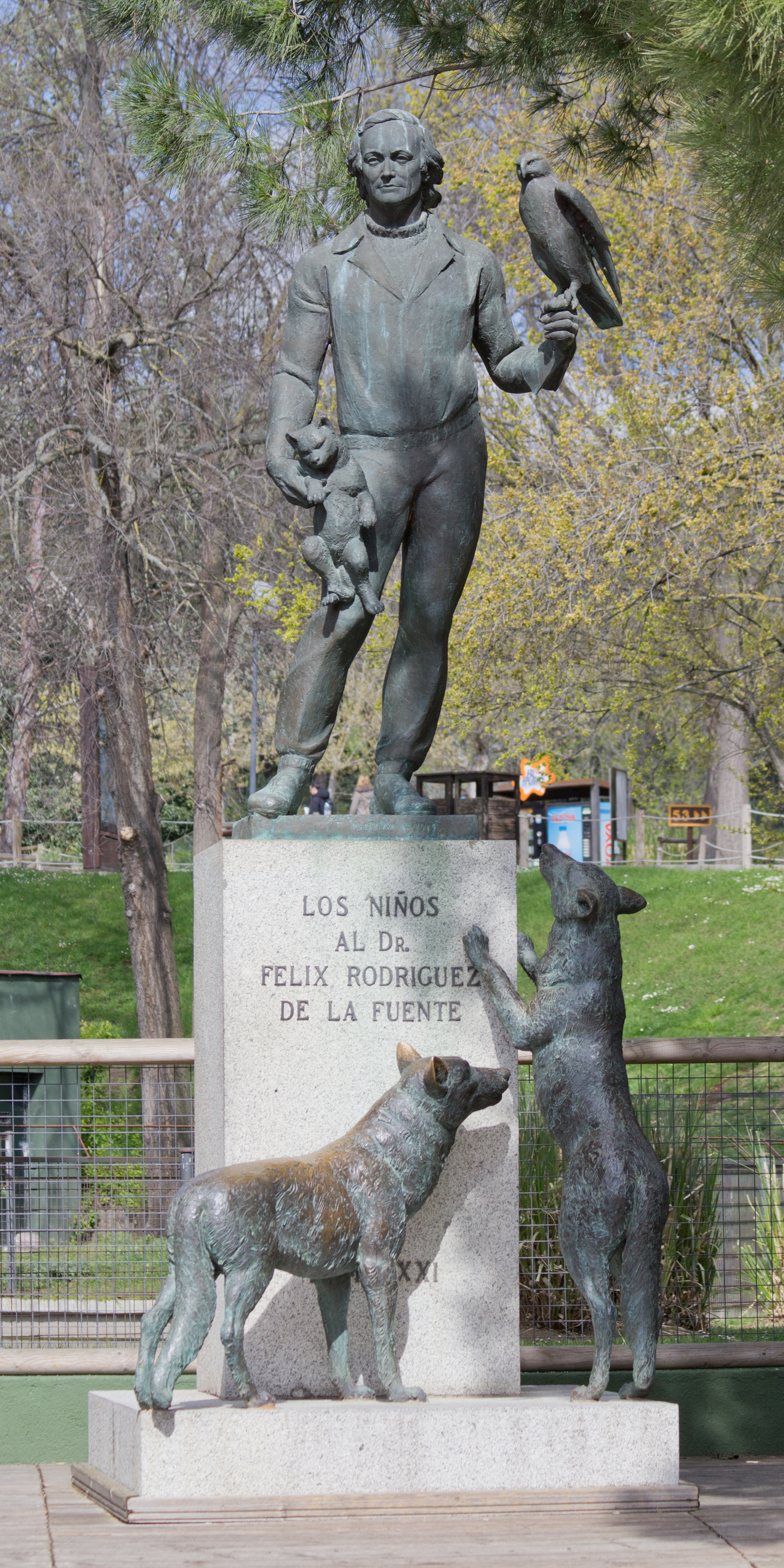
Félix Rodríguez de la Fuente monument at the Madrid Zoo

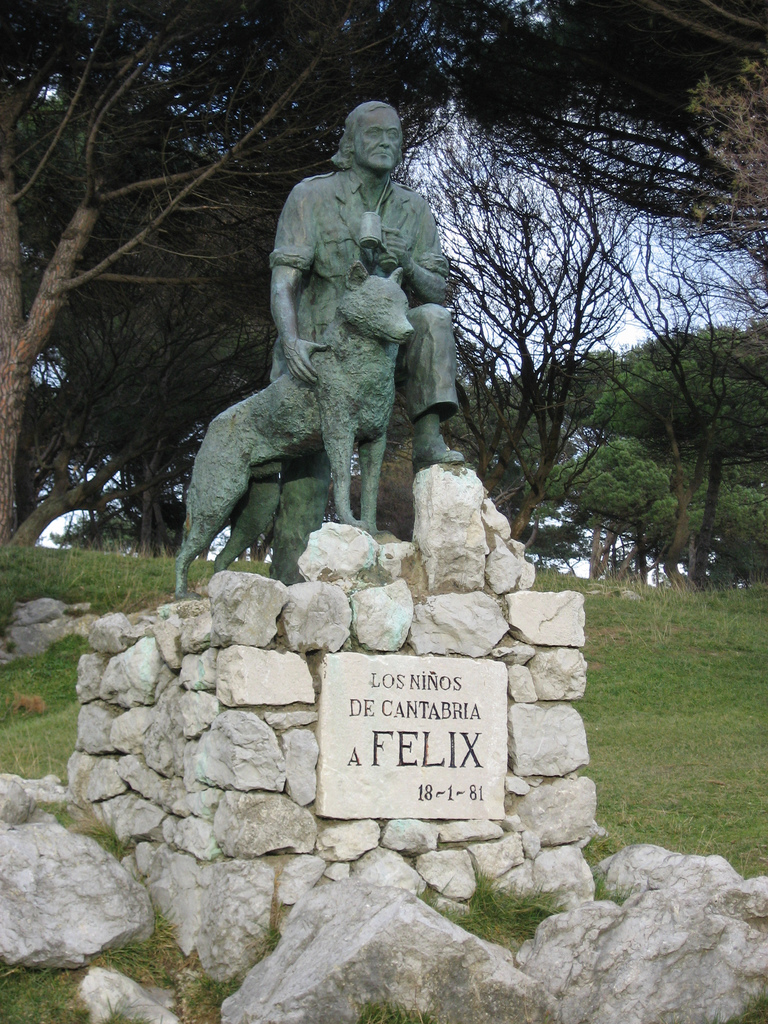
Félix Rodríguez de la Fuente monument in the Magdalena Peninsula, Santander

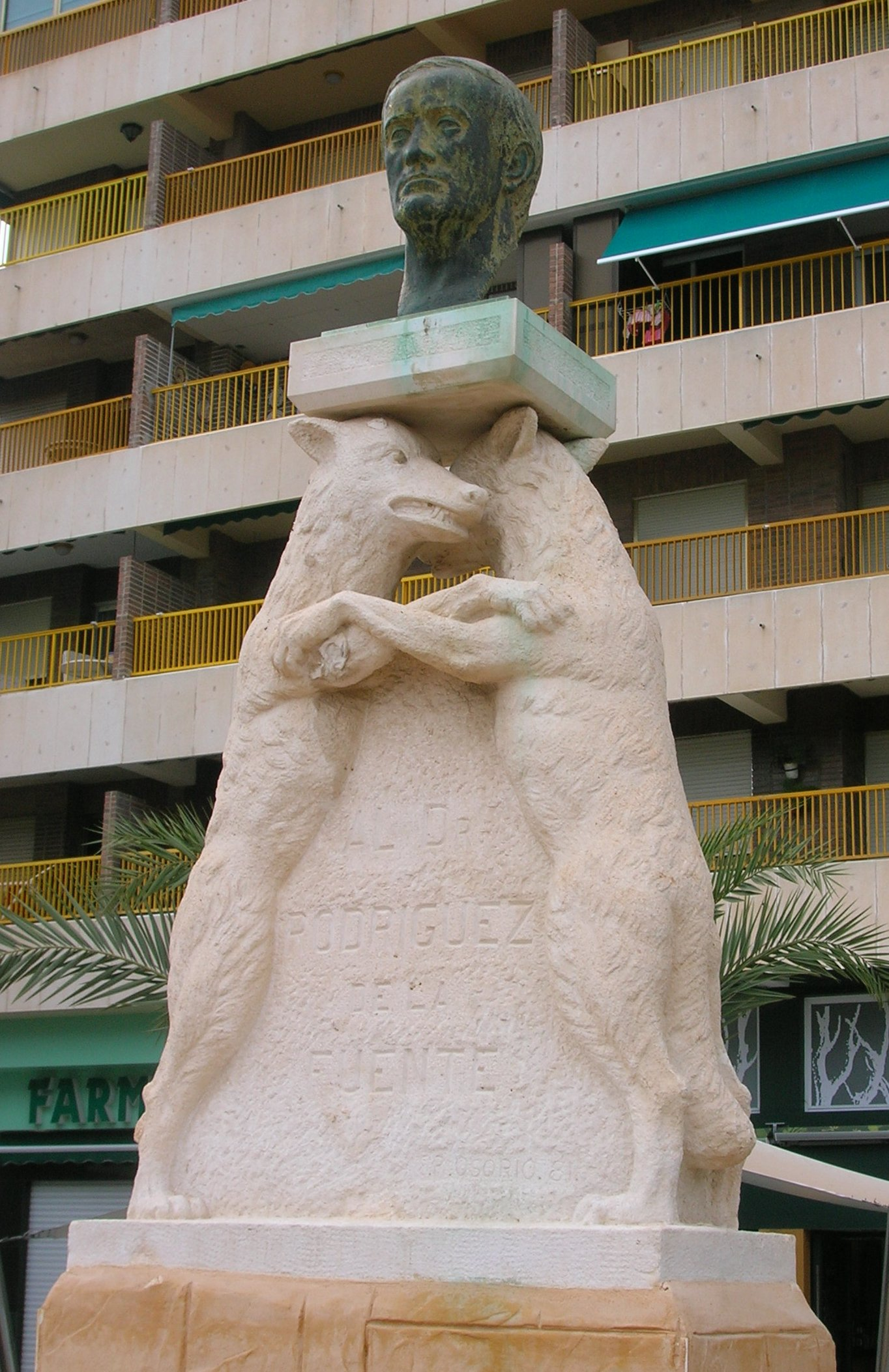
Félix Rodríguez de la Fuente monument in Santa Pola, province of Alicante

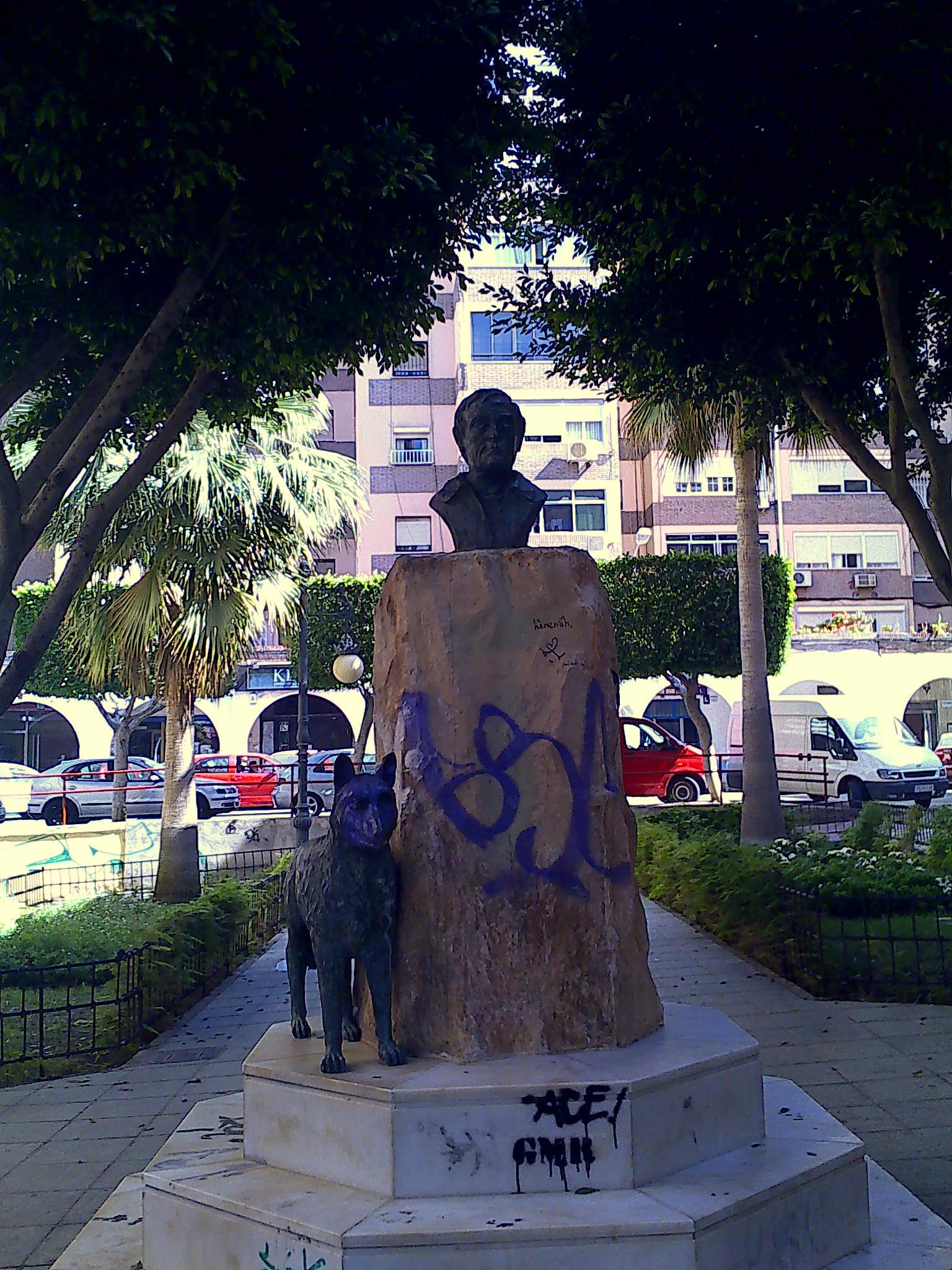
Félix Rodríguez de la Fuente monument in Almería

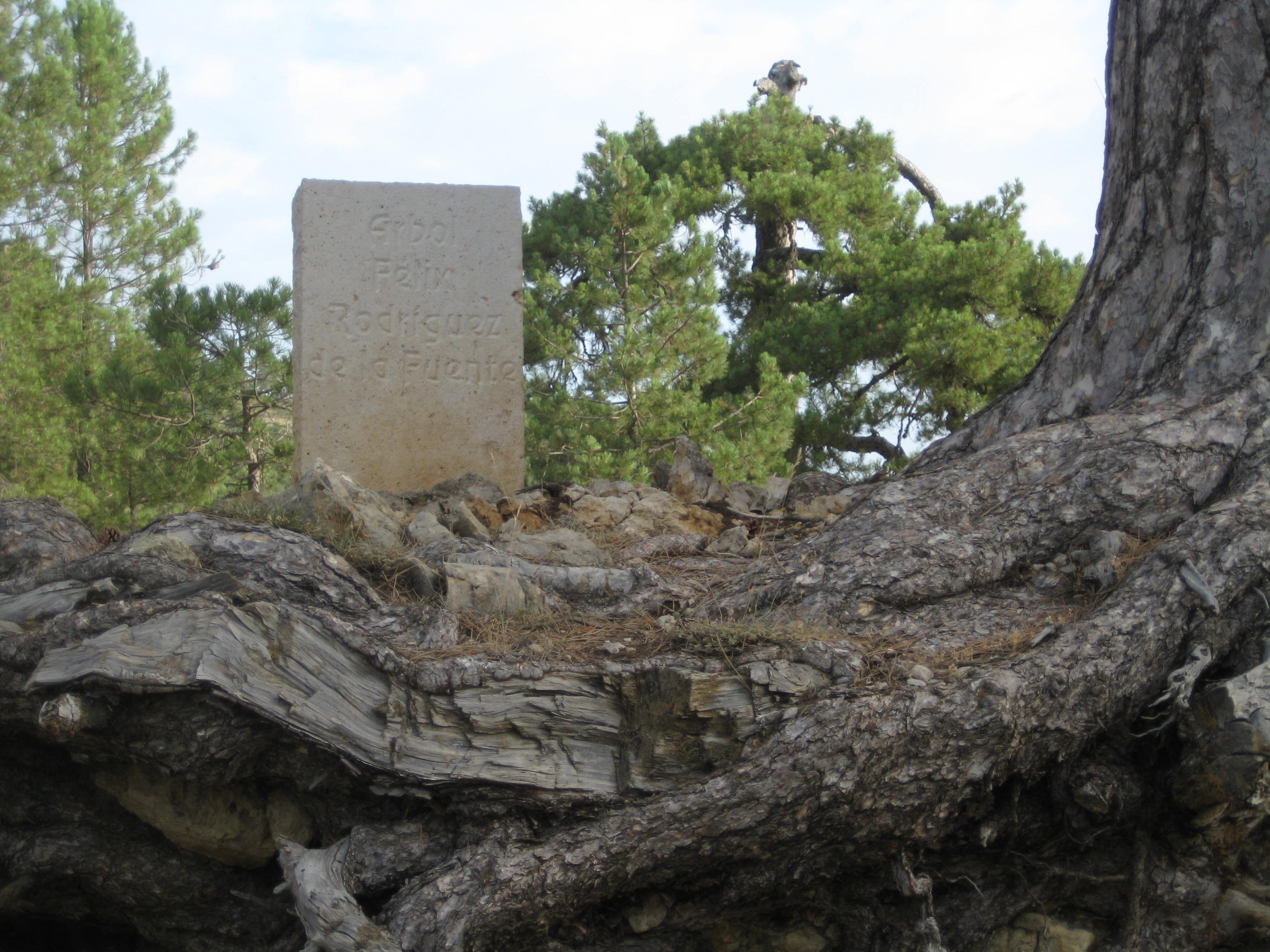
A more-than-300-year-old pinus nigra dedicated to the memory of Félix Rodríguez de la Fuente at the Sierras de Cazorla, Segura y Las Villas Natural Park in Cazorla, Andalusia
