= National Environmental Award (Spain) =

- Native name: Premio Nacional de Medio Ambiente
- Description: Environmental achievements and conservation in Spain
- Country: Spain
- Presented by: Ministry of Environment
- Reward: €22,000 (as of 2009)

The National Environmental Award (Spanish: Premio Nacional de Medio Ambiente) was an annual honor given by Spain's Ministry of Environment from 1986 to 2009. Several prizes were awarded, some of them bearing the names of distinguished naturalists such as Félix Rodríguez de la Fuente and Lucas Mallada. In 2009, its last year, each of the two awardees was endowed with 22,000 euros.

== List of awardees ==
Year	Title	Awardee	Ref.
1986	Felix Rodríguez de la Fuente Award for Natural Conservation	Javier Francisco Blasco Zumeta	
1991	National Environmental Award	Eduardo Martínez de Pisón (Special Mention to Joaquín Araújo)	
1992	National Environmental Award	Nature Protection Service	
1997	National Environmental Award	Joaquín Araújo	
1998	National Award for Individual	Pedro Costa Morata	
1998	National Award for NGO	AEMS-Ríos con Vida	
1998	National Award for Communications Media	Julen Rekondo Bravo (Honorable Mention to Empresa Municipal de Transportes de Madrid)	
2000	Lucas Mallada National Economics and Environment Award	José Manuel Naredo Pérez (Honorable Mention to the City Council of Orihuela)	
2000	National Environmental Water Award	Centro de Estudios Hidrográfico Cedex	
2000	Felix Rodríguez de la Fuente Award for Natural Conservation	Francisco Díaz Pineda	
2001	National Environmental Water Award	Generalitat Valenciana Council for Public Works and Urbanisms	
2001	Lucas Mallada National Economics and Environment Award	Diego Azqueta Oyarzun and Carlos Romero López	
2001	Felix Rodríguez de la Fuente Award for Natural Conservation	Miguel Delibes de Castro (Special Mention to Juan Varela)	
2001	National Environmental and Business Award	Caja de Ahorros del Mediterráneo	
2001	National Parks Award	Borja Cardelús	
2002	National Environmental Water Award	University of Cantabria Group of Submarine Emissaries and Environmental Hydraulics	
2002	Lucas Mallada National Economics and Environment Award	Pablo Campos Palacín	
2002	Felix Rodríguez de la Fuente Award for Natural Conservation	Shared between WWF/Adena and Xavier Pastor	
2002	National Environmental and Business Award	Sociedad Cooperativa de Comercialización Agraria (COATO)	
2002	National Environmental Journalism Award	Gustavo Catalán (El Mundo)	
2003	Lucas Mallada National Economics and Environment Award	Ramón Tamames	
2003	Felix Rodríguez de la Fuente Award for Natural Conservation	Mónica Fernández-Aceytuno	
2003	National Environmental Water Award	Narigota	
2003	National Environmental Award	José Antonio Valverde and Javier de Sebastián	
2003	National Environmental Journalism Award	Ex aequo: Silvia García (Antena 3) and Javier Grégori (Cadena SER)	
2004	Felix Rodríguez de la Fuente Award for Natural Conservation	Ecologists in Action and Martí Boada	
2004	Lucas Mallada National Economics and Environment Award	Federico Aguilera Klink	
2004	National Environmental Journalism Award	Ex aequo: Antonio Cerillo and D. José María Montero Sandoval	
2005	Lucas Mallada National Economics and Environment Award	María Carmen Gallastegui Zulaica	
2005	National Natural Conservation Award	Mario Gaviria Labarta	
2005	National Environmental Journalism Award	Ex aequo: Maria Josep Picó Garcés and Arturo Larena Larena	
2007	National Environmental Award	Empresa de Aceros Inoxidables de Las Tunas (ACINOX-Tunas)	
2008	National Environmental Award	Council of Caso, Asturias	
2009	National Environmental Award	Santiago José Rubio Jorge and Fondo Asturiano para la Protección de los Animales Salvajes (FAPAS)	
2009	Honorable Mention: Felix Rodríguez de la Fuente Award for Natural Conservation	José Fernández Blanco, Oceana, "Resembrando e intercambiando" Seed Network	

== See also ==
- List of environmental awards
