= La Pagoda =

Laboratorios Jorba
- La Pagoda
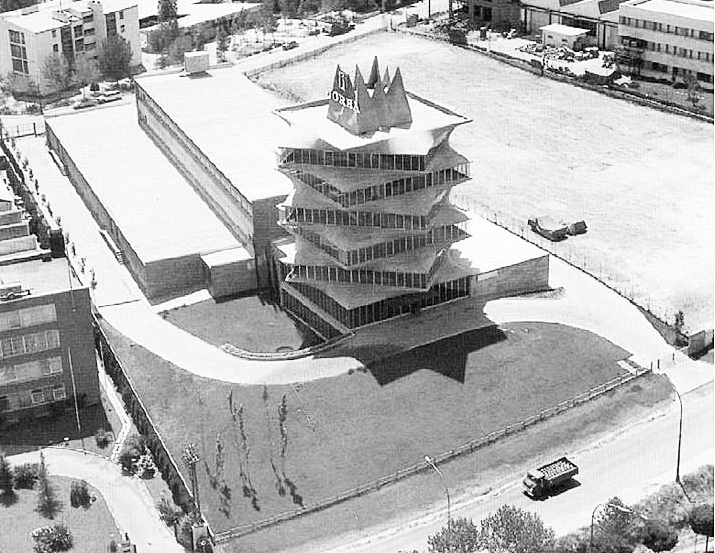
- c. 1970
- Interactive map of the Laboratorios Jorba area

General information
- Location: Madrid, Spain, Spain
- Construction started: 1965
- Completed: 1967
- Demolished: 1999
- Client: Laboratorios JORBA

Design and construction
- Architect: Miguel Fisac

La Pagoda, officially known as Laboratorios Jorba, was a building in Madrid designed by Spanish architect Miguel Fisac. It was located near the Avenida de América and served as the headquarters of Laboratorios Jorba, a pharmaceutical company. The popular name of the building refers to the visible structure's resemblance to a pagoda, with each floor rotated 45º from the lower one and joined with a hyperboloid ruled surface. It was controversially demolished in 1999, despite being widely recognised as one of the city's architectural icons.
