= Pagoda (band) =

American rock band

- Also known as: Michael Pitt and Pagoda
- Origin: Brooklyn, New York, U.S.
- Genres: Alternative rock, grunge, indie rock, experimental rock
- Years active: 2001–2011
- Label: Ecstatic Peace / Universal
- Members: Michael Pitt; Chris Hoffman; Willy Paredes; Reece Carr
- Past members: Ryan Donowho; Christian Zucconi; Indigo Ruth-Davis; Jamie Kallend; Luca Amendolara
- Website: pagoda.bandpage.com

Pagoda was an American rock band from Brooklyn, New York. Its last known lineup before the breakup in 2011 included Michael Pitt as vocalist and guitarist, Reece Carr on drums, Willie Paredes on bass, and Chris Hoffman on cello. Their first self-titled album was released on February 27, 2007 through Ecstatic Peace. They began recording their sophomore release in March 2009 at Excello Recording Studios in Brooklyn, New York, with producer Hugh Pool. In October 2009, they released their second career single, "Warzone", on their official Myspace page.

== History ==
Pagoda began as a musical concept of lead singer and guitarist Michael Pitt. While working on Gus Van Sant's 2005 film Last Days, Pitt was introduced to Thurston Moore of Sonic Youth, who signed on to the film as a musical advisor. Van Sant urged Michael to play Moore one of his original songs and Moore was impressed, eventually signing Pitt and Pagoda's then current lineup (which included Jamie Kallend, actor/musician Ryan Donowho and Indigo Ruth-Davis) to his Ecstatic Peace imprint.

The band spent two months recording the record in Milan, Italy, with producer Luca Amendolara, in which time more than forty songs were recorded. Ten (including a bonus track) were eventually chosen and Pagoda's eponymous debut album was released in early 2007. However, by the time of the album's release, the current Pagoda lineup had dismantled. It was announced through the band's official website that the new lineup included Willy Paredes on bass guitar, Chris Hoffman on cello and Reece Carr on drums.

The lineup entered the studio in March 2009 to record their as yet untitled sophomore release. Recorded live in the studio by producer Hugh Pool at Excello Recording Studios in Brooklyn, New York, the album marks a departure from the post-grunge freak-out of their debut. On a trip to Morocco, Pitt was introduced to Gnawa music. The Gnawa play deeply hypnotic trance music, marked by low-toned, rhythmic sintir melodies, call and response singing, handclapping and cymbals. This music influenced the sound of the album. And in late 2011, Pitt announced the band's breakup. "We just don't have the time, and if the album does come out in the U.S., we will all be lucky. But for now we leave you." Pitt said during an interview in November 2011.

== Pagoda (album) ==
Pagoda was released on February 27, 2007, in the United States and May 14, 2007, in the United Kingdom. A year prior to its release, the band had offered a five-track sampler featuring the songs "Death to Birth", "Fetus", "Sadartha", "Song 1" and "I Do" to audiences who attended their live shows. Following the cult success of Last Days, the sampler was leaked onto the internet and eventually offered for free on the band's official Myspace page. This was the band's first release on Ecstatic Peace. It received generally positive reviews in the media, with Spin Magazine praising lead single "Lesson Learned" as a "grungy-around-the-edges rumbler on which Pitt growls momentarily about self-medicating with aneurysm-inducing aplomb." In its three-star review of the album, Blender Magazine stated "Pitt stresses that he's not just another actor slumming in a band. He needn’t bother: Even if this is an act, it's a perfectly good one."

== Rebirth ==
Pagoda's current lineup began recording Rebirth, the follow-up to their 2007 debut in March 2009 at Excello Recording Studios in Brooklyn, New York, with producer Hugh Pool. The songs were recorded live in the studio (except for overdubs which were added later) and were documented by a crew of cameramen and photographers who filmed the band in high definition. The April sessions were also documented on the band's official Myspace blog in which it was stated that "The new material has a decidedly eastern feel to it, incorporating everything from Arabic, Japanese and African rhythms. Whereas these elements underlaid the group's first release, they are brought to the forefront for its follow-up." The blog also revealed several of the new song titles including "Sahara", "Drop D", "Native American" and "Blood Crosses". It was revealed that the new album would feature experiments with Gnawa music. The first single off the album "Warzone" debuted on Myspace in October 2009. In April 2010, it was revealed that the album, titled Rebirth, would also include a DVD element, described as The Rebirth: A Visual Album Pagoda has said they will release the album in late 2013. The American release of the album is being pushed back due to the lack of P.R. Michael Pitt has said, "we just released an album in 2007, give us a break, it normally takes 5 years to release a second album, right?" On the band's new website, it has been announced that a new album, which is presumably Rebirth, was released in December 2012. However, the album has not yet been released in its entirety. On April 4, 2013, Michael released the full-length video equivalent of the album on his YouTube page. It has since been removed. Full length tracks from the album were also put on Pagoda's Bandpage. The same tracks are available for download on the band's official website. In August 2019 Michael Pitt uploaded the video again to his own YouTube page.

== Discography ==
- The Demo (EP) - 2005
- Pagoda - 2007
- Rebirth - 2013
