= Pagoda Mountain =

Mountain in the United States

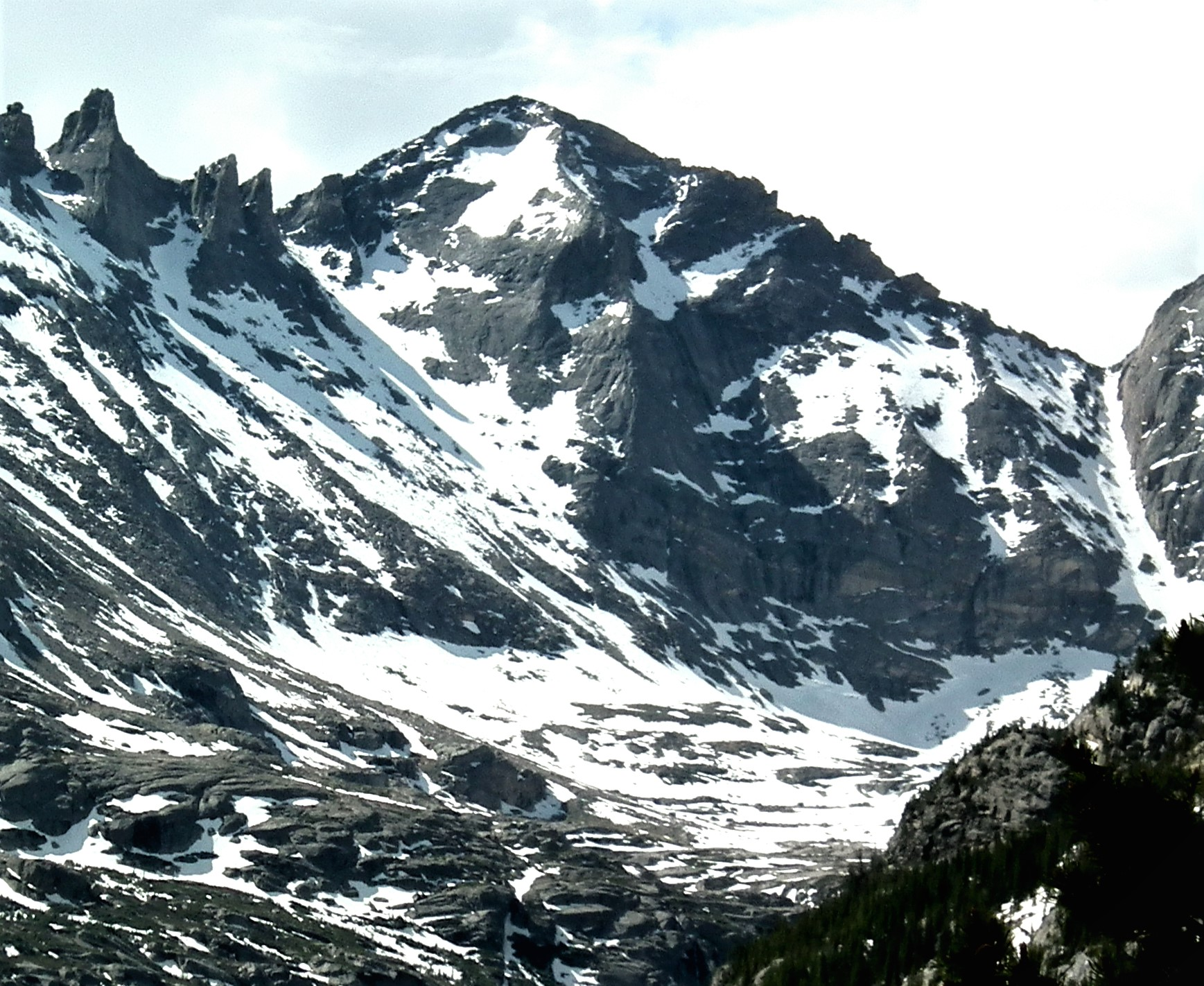
- North aspect

Highest point
- Elevation: 13,497 ft (4,114 m)
- Prominence: 410 ft (125 m)
- Parent peak: Longs Peak (14,259 ft)
- Isolation: 0.71 mi (1.14 km)
- Coordinates: 40°14′57″N 105°37′35″W

Geography
- Location within Colorado Location within the United States
- Country: United States
- State: Colorado
- County: Boulder County
- Protected area: Rocky Mountain National Park
- Parent range: Rocky Mountains; Front Range
- Topo map: USGS Isolation Peak

Geology
- Rock age: Precambrian
- Rock type(s): Granite of Longs Peak batholith Biotite schist and gneiss

Climbing
- Easiest route: class 3 scrambling

Pagoda Mountain is a 13,497-foot-elevation (4,114-meter) mountain summit in Boulder County, Colorado, United States.

== Description ==
Pagoda Mountain is located one mile east of the Continental Divide in the Front Range of the Rocky Mountains. The mountain is situated within Rocky Mountain National Park and is the fifth-highest peak in Boulder County. Precipitation runoff from the mountain's south slope drains to North St. Vrain Creek via Hunters Creek and the north slope drains to Glacier Creek which is a tributary of the Big Thompson River. Topographic relief is significant as the summit rises 1,940 feet (590 meters) above Green Lake in one-half mile. The mountain's toponym was officially adopted in 1911 by the United States Board on Geographic Names and is so named because the mountain's shape resembles a pagoda.

== Climate ==
According to the Köppen climate classification system, Pagoda Mountain is located in an alpine subarctic climate zone with cold, snowy winters and cool to warm summers. Due to its altitude, it receives precipitation all year, as snow in winter, and as thunderstorms in summer, with a dry period in late spring.

== See also ==
- List of peaks in Rocky Mountain National Park
- Mountains of Boulder County, Colorado
- Thirteener

== Gallery ==
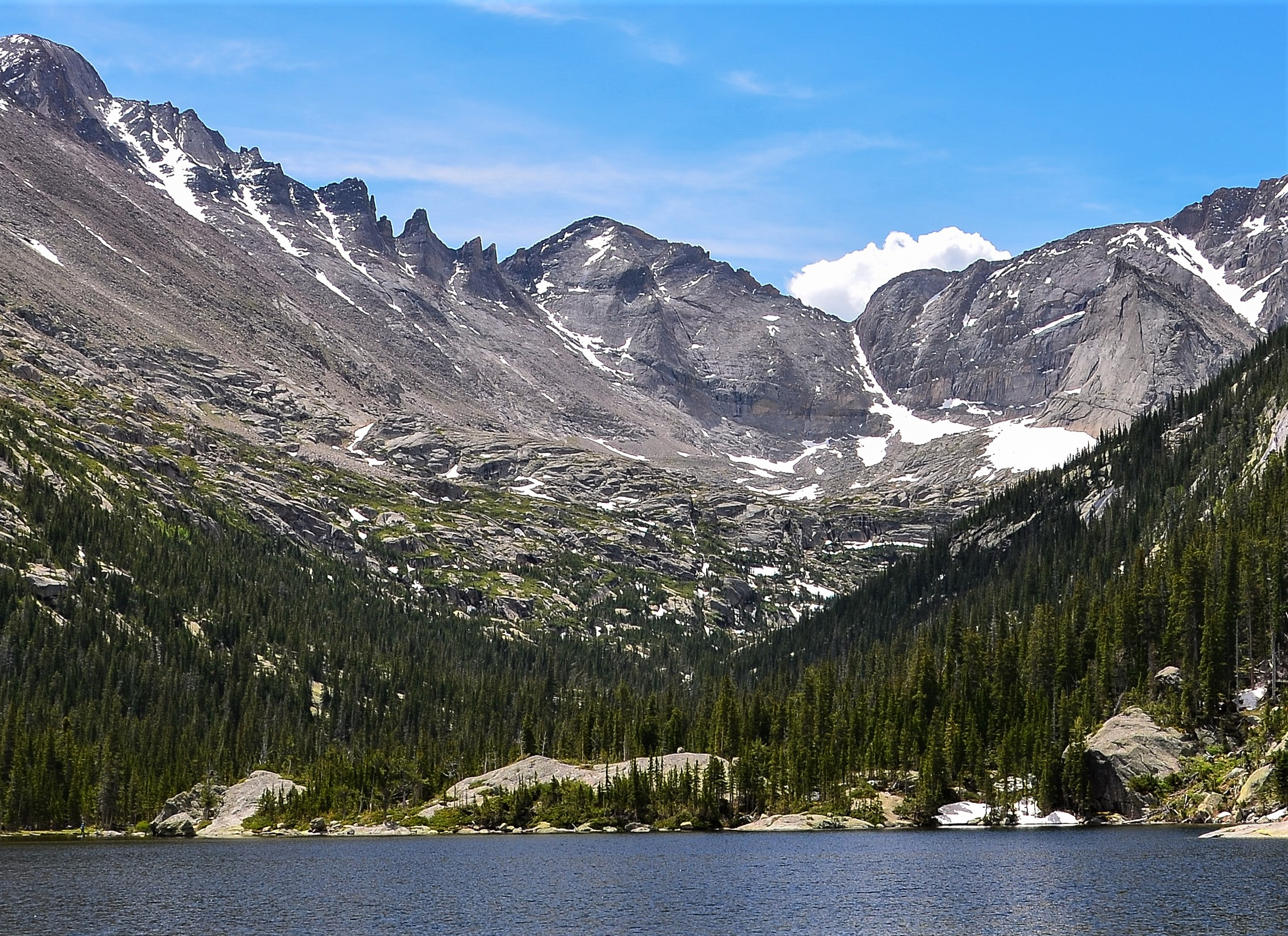
North aspect, from Mills Lake

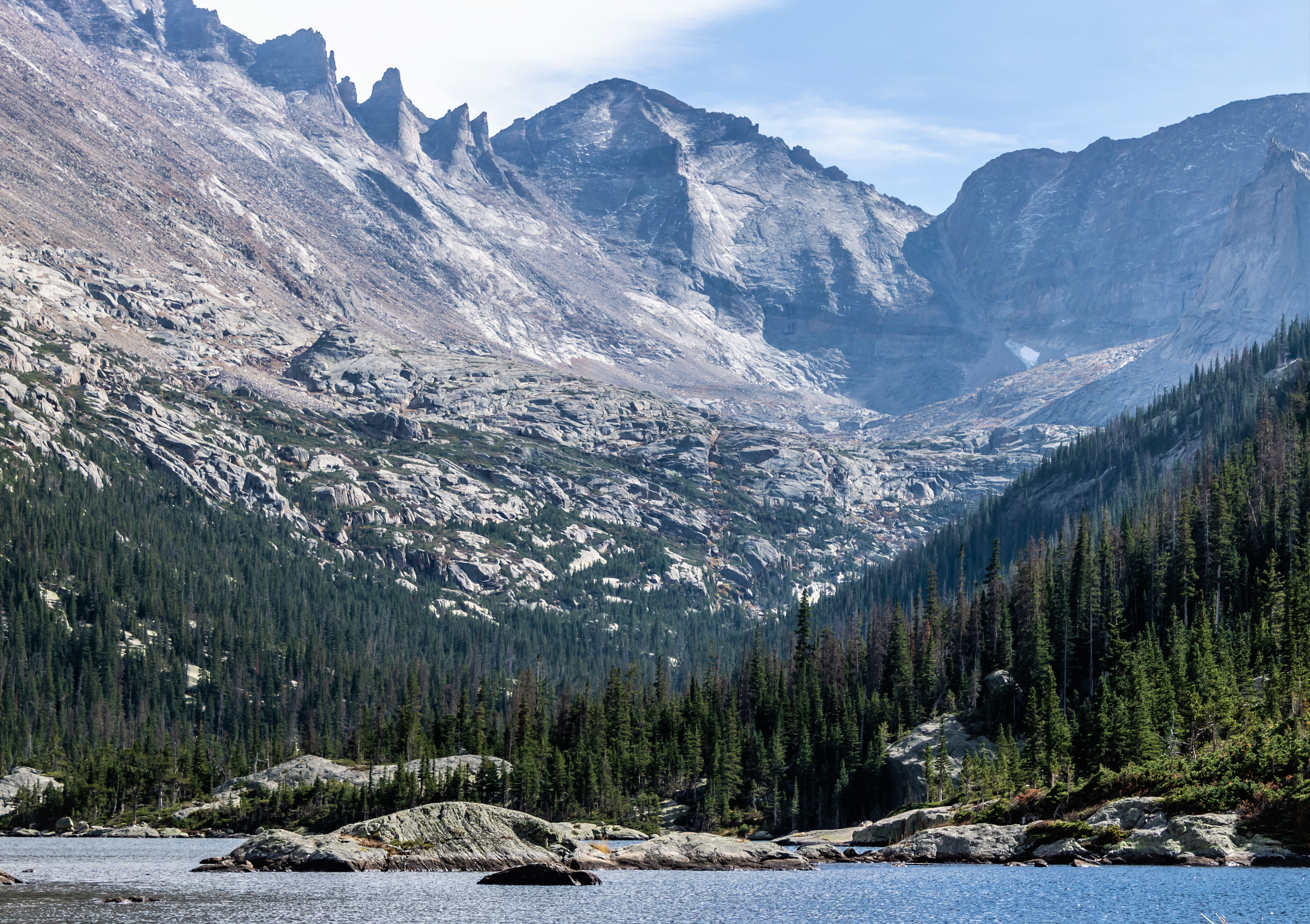
North aspect, from Mills Lake

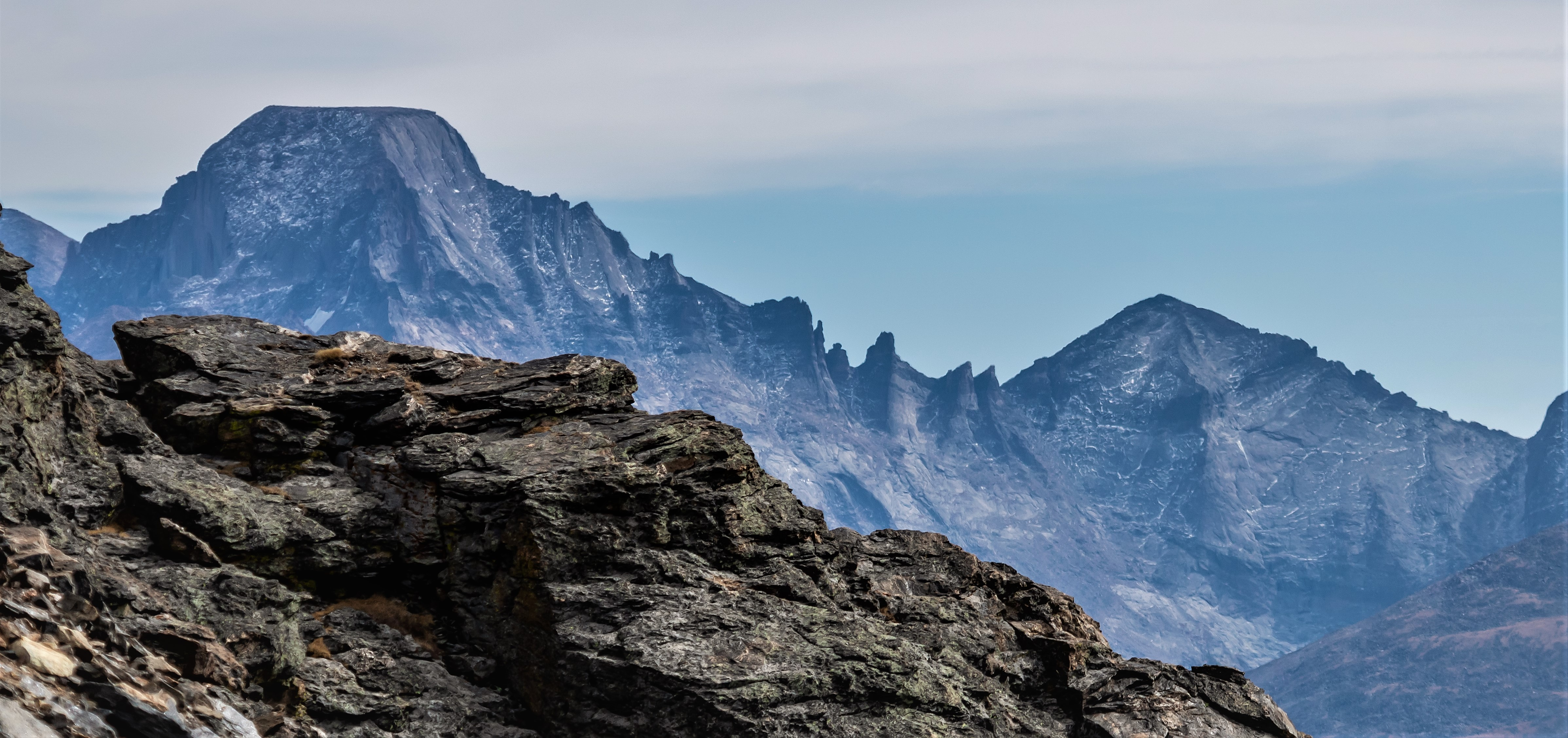
Longs Peak (left) and Pagoda Mountain (right)

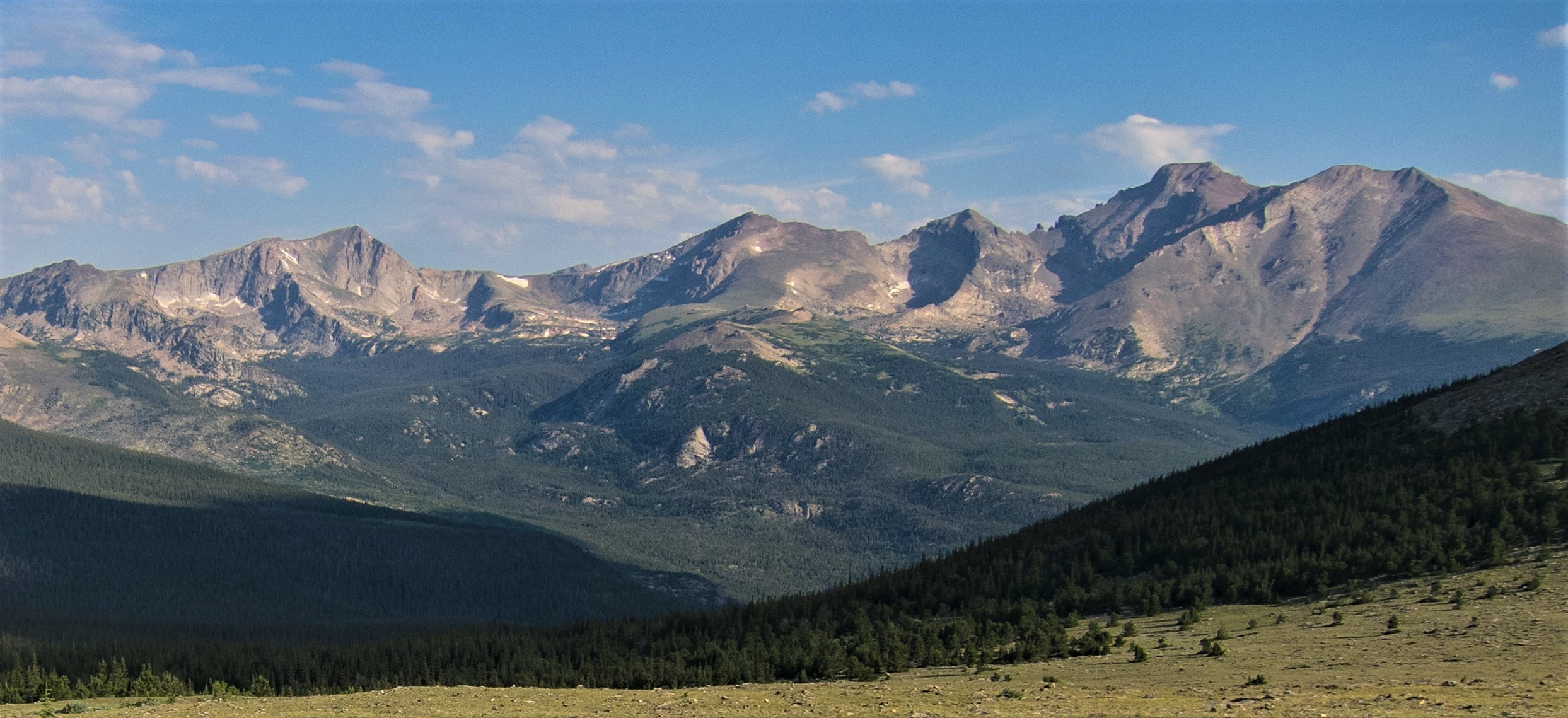
Left to right: Mount Alice, Chiefs Head Peak (centered), Pagoda Mountain, Longs Peak, Mount Meeker. Southeast aspect viewed across Wild Basin.

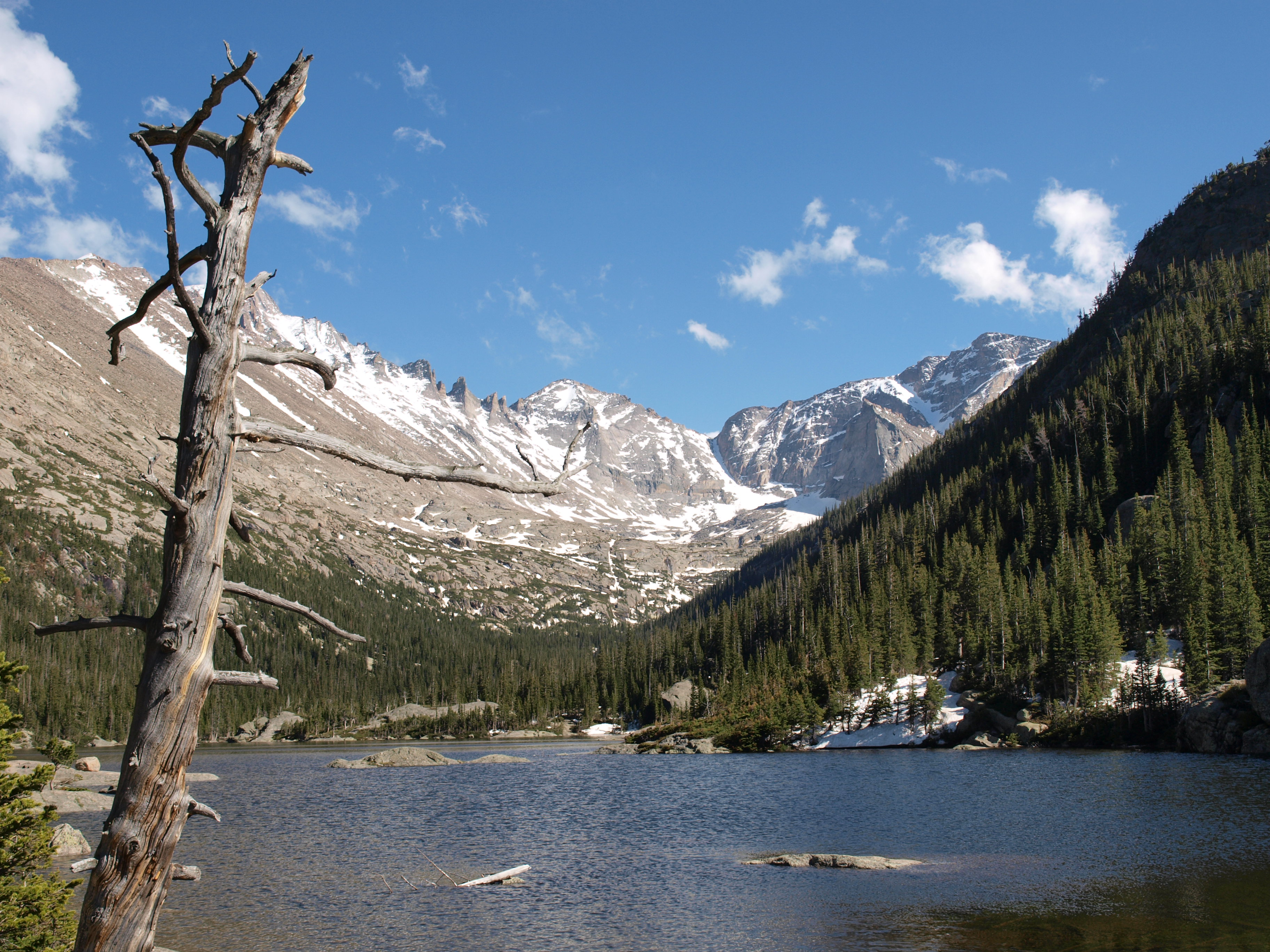
Pagoda Mountain centered
