= Ecstatic Peace! =

Record label

- Founded: 1981
- Founder: Thurston Moore
- Distributor: Motown Records/Caroline Distribution
- Genre: Indie rock, noise rock
- Country of origin: United States
- Location: Easthampton, Massachusetts
- Official website: http://www.ecstaticpeace.com

Ecstatic Peace! is a record label based in Easthampton, Massachusetts, founded in 1981 by American musician Thurston Moore of Sonic Youth. The label name is borrowed from a line in Tom Wolfe's 1968 nonfiction novel The Electric Kool-Aid Acid Test.

The label's releases are eclectic and often experimental or avant-garde. The premiere release was a split cassette featuring spoken word performances from Michael Gira of Swans and Lydia Lunch titled, "Hard Rock" in 1984. The label's second release was a Sonic Youth cassette titled, "Sonic Death Sonic-Youth Live" also released in 1984, which was a live recording of an early performance.

Ecstatic Peace! has released more than 200 LPs, cassettes, 7"s, and CDs, from both highly established and fledgling artists, including Hush Arbors, be your own PET, Awesome Color, Black Helicopter, Free Kitten, Arthur Doyle, Dredd Foole, No-Neck Blues Band, Nels Cline, Notekillers, Magik Markers, Tall Firs, Pagoda, My Cat Is An Alien, Monotract, MV & EE, Sunburned Hand of the Man, Violent Soho, and many more.

In February 2006, Moore signed a deal with Universal to distribute the label's albums.

The label's website was hacked at some point during the latter half of 2012. Since 2015, the site's lone page says "Thanks for checking in. Have a good day." As of 2022, this was its last update.

Ecstatic Peace! has released three records since 2014, all of which are Thurston Moore recordings.

== See also ==
- List of record labels
- Ecstatic Peace Library
