= Miguel Fisac =

Spanish architect and painter (1913–2006)

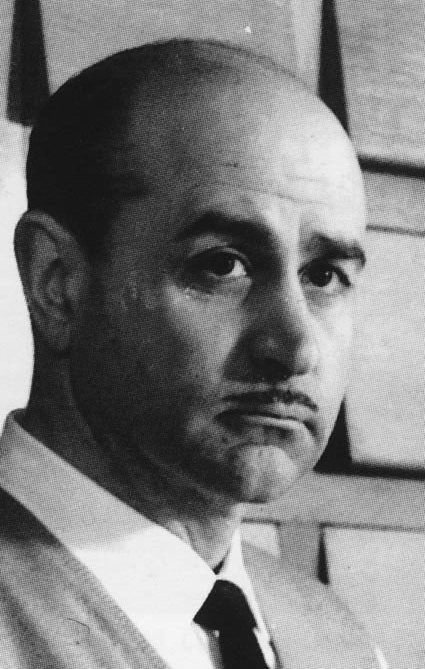
- Fotografía de Miguel Fisac, hacia 1950
- Born: 29 September 1913
- Died: 12 May 2006 (aged 92)
- Occupation: Architect
- Works: Moroder Building, headquarters of Secretaría General de Pesca del Ministerio de Agricultura, Alimentación y Medio Ambiente, iglesia de Santa Ana y Nuestra Señora de la Esperanza
- Website: fundacionfisac.com/la-fundacion/origen-y-estructura-2/

Miguel Fisac Serna (1913–2006) was a Spanish architect, urban planner, and painter. He was a member of Opus Dei from 1935 to 1955, but later publicly criticized that organization as well as the character of its founder, Mons. Josemaría Escrivá.

== Biography ==
He was born 29 September 1913 in Daimiel in Spain. His father was Joaquín Fisac, his mother Amparo Serna. He had six brothers and sisters, among them Dolores 'Lola' Fisac (1909-2005), who became one of the first female Opus Dei members. He moved to Madrid aged 17 to study architecture. He was member of Catholic organization Opus Dei from 1935 till 1955, when he left. He fled to France during the Civil War along with Opus Dei founder Josemaría Escrivá and a group of other members. He returned after the war, and graduated from ETSAM in 1942. He married Ana María Badell in 1957. He died 12 May 2006 in Madrid.

== Works ==
- Centro de Estudios Hidrográficos, Madrid (1963)
- Laboratorios Jorba, Madrid, known as La Pagoda (1967, demolished 1999)

== Gallery ==
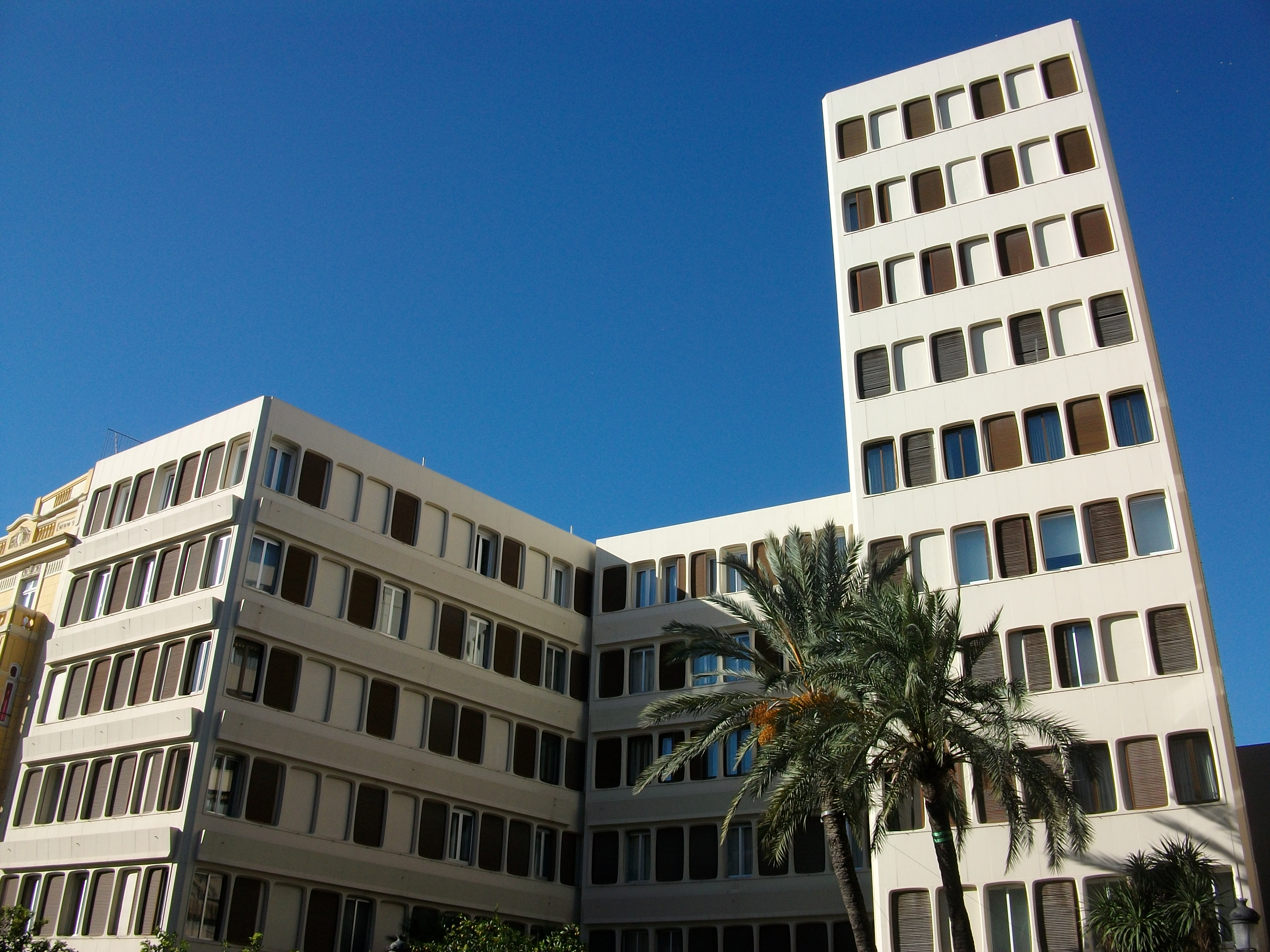
Edificio Moròder, València

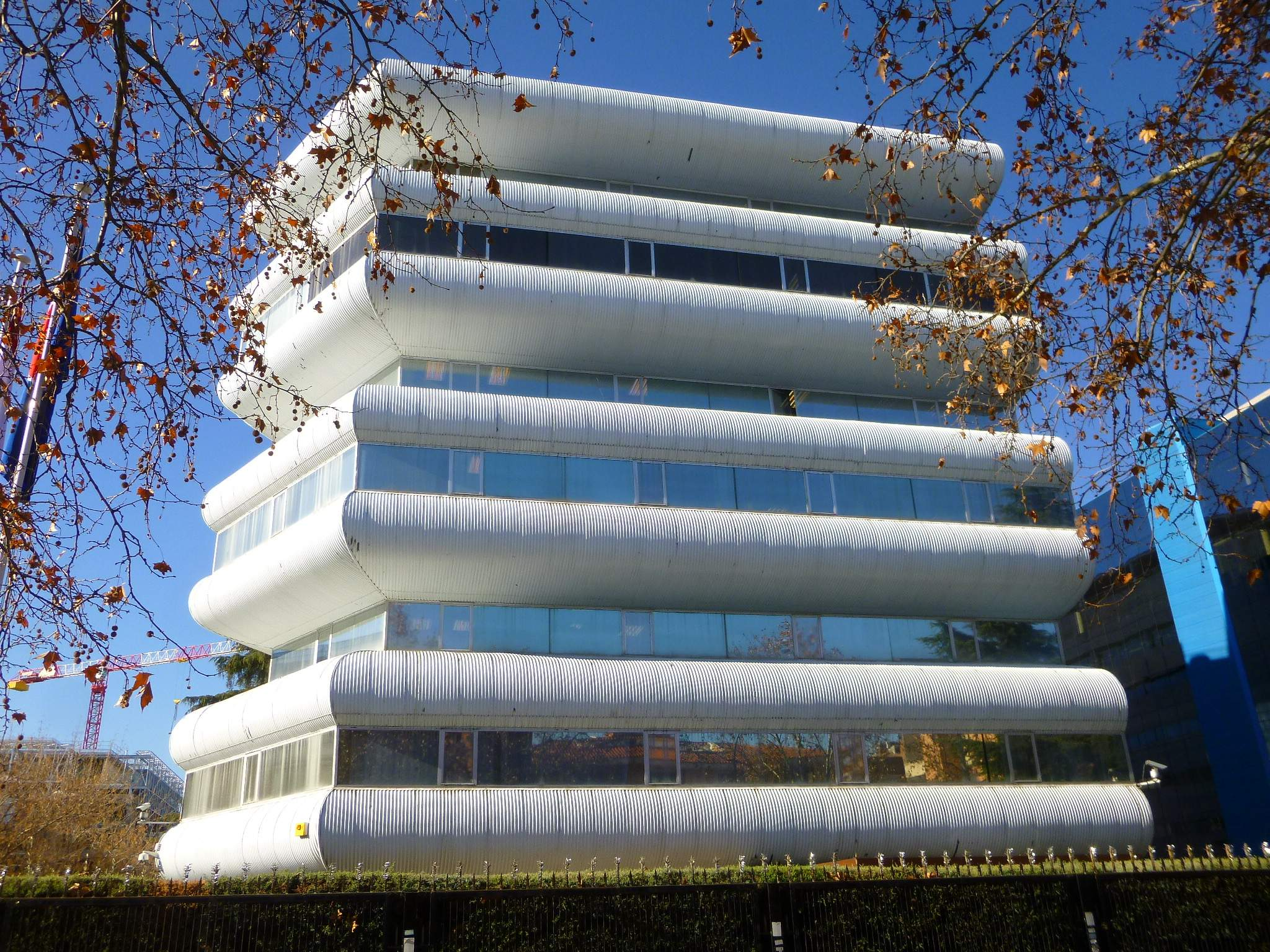
Indonesian embassy, Madrid

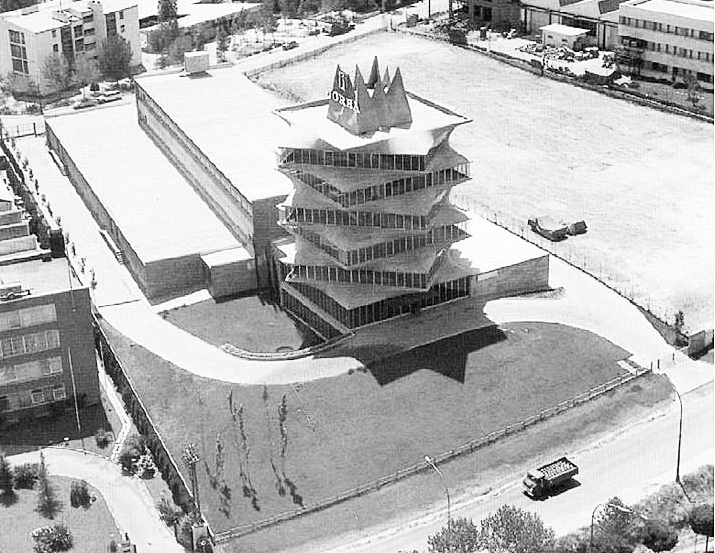
Laboratorios Jorba, Madrid (demolished)

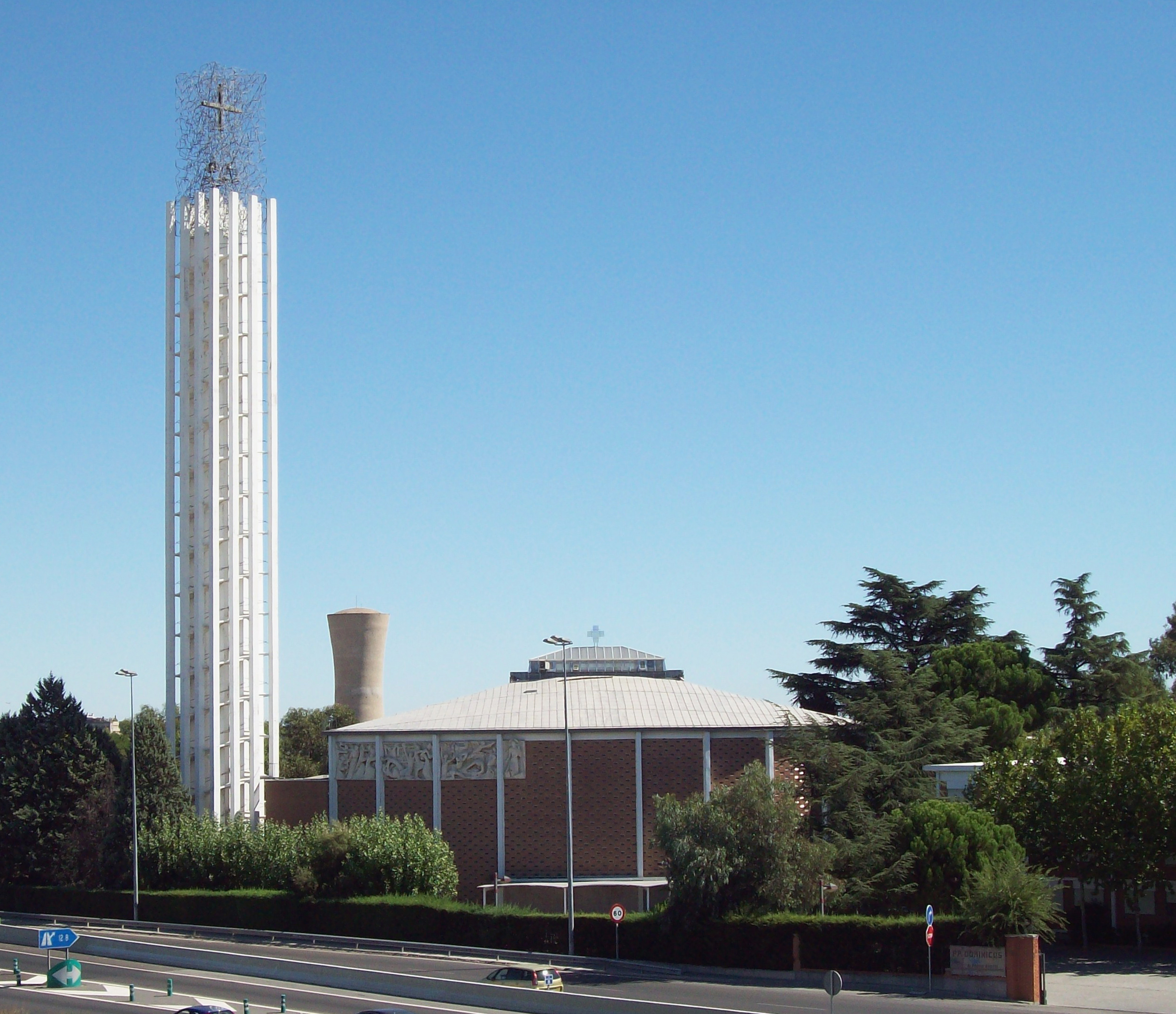
Iglesia de San Pedro Mártir, Madrid

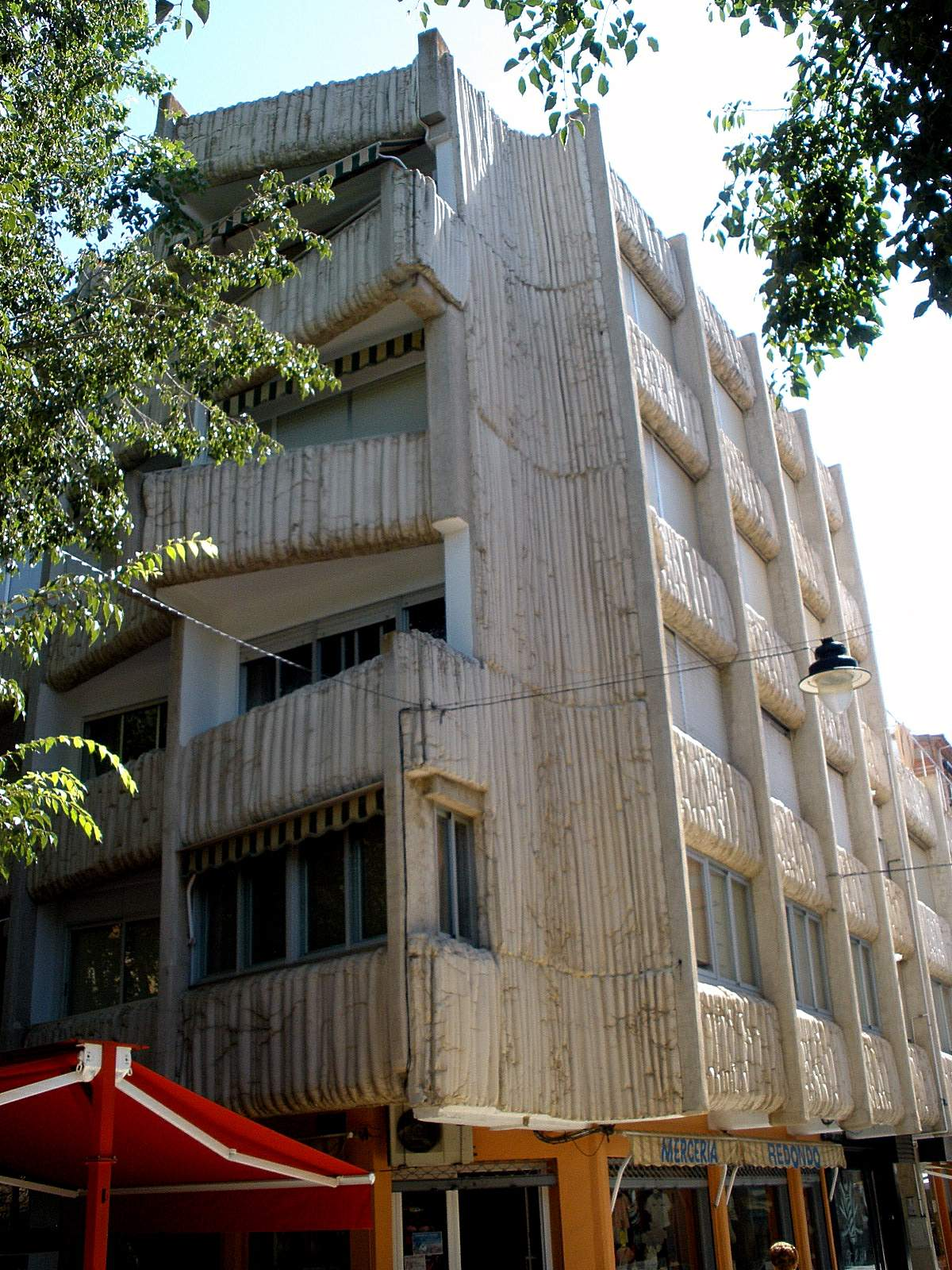
Edificio de Viviendas del Parterre, Daimiel
