= Tightrope (EP) =

EP by Walk the Moon
- Released: January 22, 2013
- Genre: Indie pop
- Length: 20:09
- Label: RCA
- Producer: Ben Allen; Mark Needham; Show Cobra

Walk the Moon chronology
Walk the Moon (2012)	Tightrope (2013)	Talking Is Hard (2014)

Singles from Tightrope
- 1. "Tightrope" Released: September 11, 2012

Tightrope is an EP by American rock band Walk the Moon. It was released digitally on January 22, 2013, by RCA Records and contains six songs, four of which were previously unreleased. A 2-color vinyl version of the EP was later released for Record Store Day on April 20, 2013. The EP was named after the opening track of the same name. It was a moderate success, debuting at number 54 on the US Billboard 200.

== Background ==
The title track to Tightrope was the fifth song on Walk the Moon's first major label studio album, Walk the Moon (2012). It was sent to US alternative radio stations on September 11, 2012, by RCA Records as the EP's lead single. The second song on the EP, "Anywayican", was first released as the B-side for the "Anna Sun" 7-inch vinyl single. The artwork for the Tightrope EP was created by Mike Perry, while its packaging was designed by Meghan Foley. According to Chris DeVille of Columbus Alive, the songs for Tightrope were recorded in a day.

Guitarist Eli Maiman told NKD Mag that there is "a lot of variety to the way" the band would write their music, saying: "Nick writes all the lyrics, but the music is a mixed bag. We don't have a set process yet, which may be a function of being such a young band."

== Music ==
The Tightrope EP consists of six tracks, which includes an acoustic version and the original cut of its title track, a pair of new original songs, a B-side from the 2012 self-titled album, and a live take of Talking Heads' "Burning Down the House". The music on the EP was compared to the likes of indie pop bands Matt and Kim and Vampire Weekend. Kiki Van Son of NKD Mag wrote that while Walk the Moon's "new material is composed of the same loud, infectious choruses" present in their previous work, "the music is rooted in older styles of rock".

Speaking to Billboard about the new originals, frontman Nicholas Petricca described "Drunk in the Woods" as a song that goes "a little harder than [what they] usually do" and thought "Tête-à-tête" would follow Walk the Moon's quirky streak a little further. Regarding the particular Talking Heads cover included at the end of the tracklist, Petricca said: "Their stuff is just dripping with personality. And there's a human factor, beautiful imperfections. We've messed around with a few different Talking Heads covers over the years. This is one that stuck."

== Release and promotion ==
Prior to the release of the EP, "Tête-à-tête" was leaked by the band early via Twitter on January 18, 2013. Their cover of "Burning Down the House" premiered exclusively on Billboard magazine's website that same day. The Tightrope EP was digitally released via RCA Records on January 22, 2013, with a 2-color vinyl edition being issued for Record Store Day on April 20, 2013. All of the EP's tracks were later included on the expanded edition of Walk the Moon's self-titled album. A video featuring their live performance of "Burning Down the House" was uploaded to Walk the Moon's Vevo channel on March 25, 2013. Tightrope is currently unavailable on either digital or vinyl format.

== Critical reception ==
In a positive review, Alternative Addiction gave the Tightrope EP a three out of five stars, stating that while "it's not as polished" as the debut album, "it's worth the same amount of attention". The staff of the publication said that it is "a light-hearted but fun EP" that is "worth looking into" with "some valuable pieces for people who are familiar with the band already". However, the EP was criticized for being "a means to promote a single" that Walk the Moon fans already have.

== Commercial performance ==
Upon its release, Tightrope charted for one week at number 54 on the US Billboard 200 on the week ending February 8, 2013. It became Walk the Moon's second chart entry on the Billboard 200, after the self-titled album in 2012.

== Track listing ==
Tightrope
No.	Title	Writer(s)	Producer(s)	Length
1.	"Tightrope"	Nicholas Petricca; Eli Maiman; Kevin Ray; Sean Waugaman; Chris Robinson	Ben Allen	3:29
2.	"Anywayican"	Petricca; Maiman; Ray; Waugaman	Allen	3:40
3.	"Tête-à-tête"	Petricca; Maiman; Ray; Waugaman	Mark Needham	2:51
4.	"Drunk in the Woods"	Petricca; Maiman; Ray; Waugaman	Needham	2:49
5.	"Tightrope" (Acoustic)	Petricca; Maiman; Ray; Waugaman; Robinson	Needham	3:29
6.	"Burning Down the House" (Live)	David Byrne; Martina Weymouth; Chris Frantz; Jerry Harrison	Show Cobra	3:51
Total length:				20:09

== Credits and personnel ==
Credits adapted from the liner notes of Tightrope.

Locations

- Recorded at Doppler Studios and Maze Studios (Atlanta, Georgia), EastWest Studios (Hollywood, California) and Theatre of Living Arts, Philadelphia
- Mixed at The Ballroom Studio (Los Angeles, California) and The Lemonade Stand, New York City
- Mastered at Marcussen Mastering

Personnel

- Nick Petricca – vocals, keyboards, percussion, songwriting
- Eli Maiman – guitar, vocals, songwriting
- Kevin Ray – bass, vocals, songwriting
- Sean Waugaman – percussion, vocals, songwriting
- Chris Robinson – songwriting
- David Byrne – songwriting
- Martina Weymouth – songwriting
- Chris Frantz – songwriting
- Jerry Harrison – songwriting
- Ben Allen – production
- Mark Needham – mixing, production
- Will Brierre – mixing assistant
- Nick DiDia – recording
- Rob Skipworth – additional engineering
- TJ Elias – assistant engineer
- Will Thrift – assistant engineer
- Joe D'Agostino – general assistant
- Sumner Jones – general assistant
- Alex Tumay – general assistant
- Ben O'Neill – assistant engineer
- Show Cobra – production
- Kevin Hartman – recording
- Jon Kaplan – mixing
- Andy Marcinkowski – mixing assistant, editing
- Stephen Marcussen – mastering

== Charts ==
=== Weekly charts ===
Chart (2013)	Peak position
US Billboard 200	54
US Top Alternative Albums (Billboard)	12
US Top Rock Albums (Billboard)	18

== Release history ==
Region	Date	Format	Label(s)	Ref.
Various	January 22, 2013	Digital download	RCA; Sony	
United States	April 20, 2013	2-color vinyl	RCA; Sony	
