= Jax Anderson =

American alt-pop musician

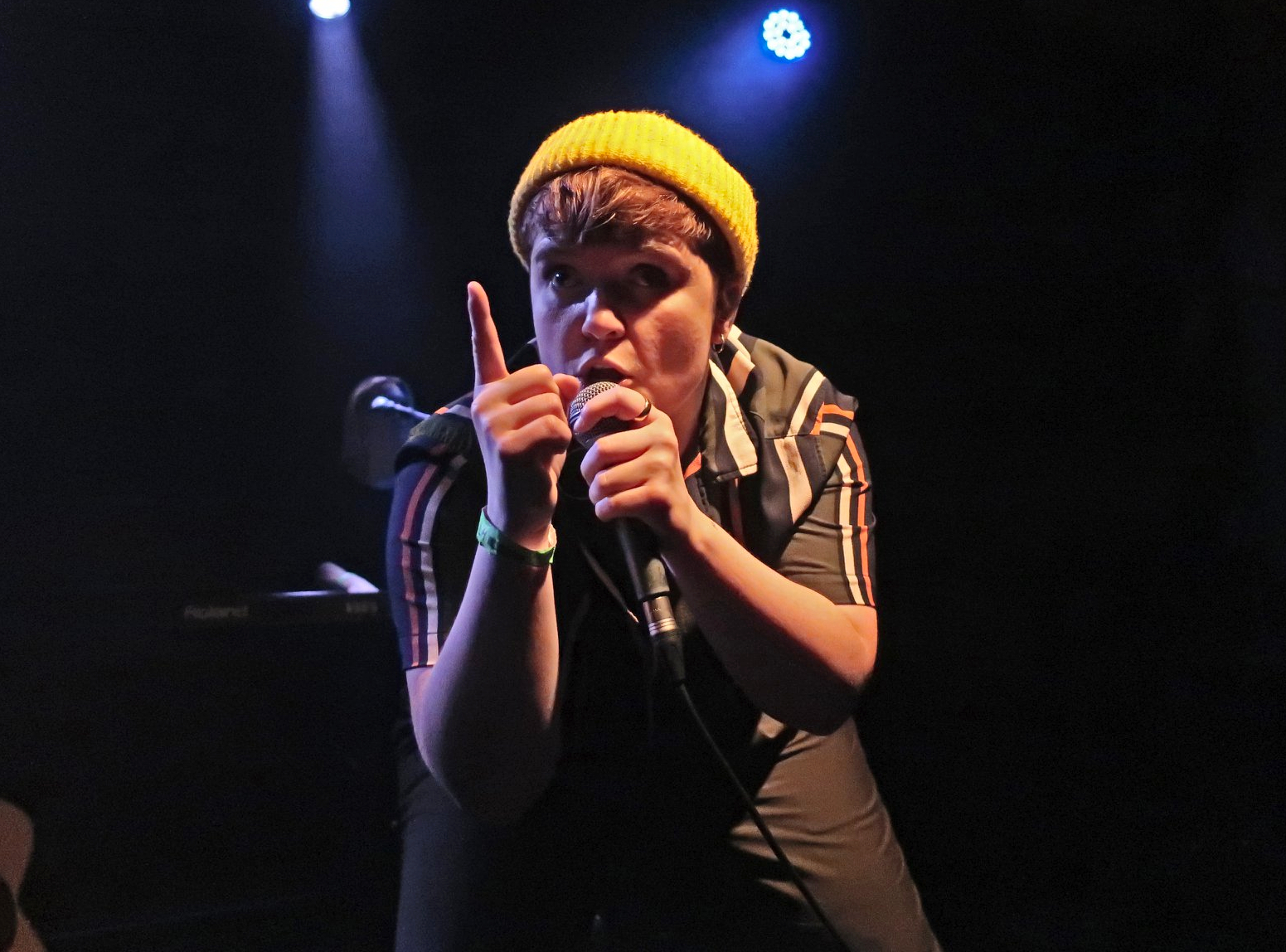
- Jax Anderson performing in Chicago in 2020

Background information
- Also known as: Flint Eastwood
- Born: Jacqueline Dean Anderson
- Origin: Detroit, Michigan, United States
- Genres: Indie pop; indie rock; electronica
- Years active: 2010–present
- Labels: Neon Gold Records; Assemble Sound; Dew Process
- Website: http://www.iamjaxanderson.com/

Jacqueline Dean "Jax" Anderson, formerly known as Flint Eastwood, is an alt pop musician from Detroit, Michigan. With wide-ranging influences from Spaghetti Westerns to Motown to mainstream dance pop, Anderson has built a reputation for her uncompromising style and high energy stage presence.

Jax Anderson formally announced a name change from Flint Eastwood. The musical project has undergone multiple transformations: Apple Trees and Tangerines (2008-2010), POWER (2010-2012), and Flint Eastwood (2012-2019). Anderson's music style is often described as "Spaghetti Western inspired".

Jax Anderson regularly tours the United States, performing in venues and music festivals of varying sizes.

== History ==
=== Apple Trees & Tangerines ===
Jax and Seth Anderson launched their joint music career as the band Apple Trees & Tangerines in 2008, along with former band members Ian Bacon, Jackleen Joseph, and Shane Nixon. In 2010, they won SESAC’s "College Battle of the Bands" in Las Vegas. That year, the Andersons informally released a 10-song EP, which included the singles "Can You Save Me" and "Sold My Soul (to the Radio)."

=== POWER ===
In 2010, Jax and Seth Anderson moved to Los Angeles and renamed their band POWER. At this time, they formally released the single "Sold My Soul to the Radio" and provided the single "Can You Save Me" as the theme song for the USA Network drama Covert Affairs. While living in LA, POWER attempted to release one song weekly for an entire year, which Anderson titled "52 in 52."

In 2011, POWER's song "The Perfect Match" was used in a commercial for Matching Donors, a nonprofit organization that helps organ transplant recipients find their a match.

=== Flint Eastwood ===
After moving back to Detroit in 2012, Seth and Jax Anderson began their solo careers as Jax spearheaded Flint Eastwood and Seth began Sybling.

Flint Eastwood released Late Nights in Bolo Ties in 2013 led by the pre-EP release of the single "Billy The Kid" in 2012. This song was used in the trailer for the feature film To Write Love on Her Arms; she also provided "The Devil's Gun" for the film's soundtrack.

In 2015, after the death of her mother, Flint Eastwood released a reflective EP titled Small Victories. During this year, the musicians disbanded, making Jax Anderson a solo act, though she still used the Flint Eastwood moniker.

In 2016, Flint Eastwood collaborated with Gosh Pith, a Detroit-based indie rock band, to release the non-EP single, "Saviors." She was also featured on Seattle-based indie artist Manatee Commune's single "What We've Got."

After signing with Neon Gold Records, Flint Eastwood released the album Broke Royalty in 2017, which was accompanied by four music videos (i.e., "Queen," "Push," "Rewind," and "Monster"). Anderson's affiliation with Neon Gold provided new opportunities, such as performing at Lollapalooza and Bonnaroo. At the later, she took part in the annual "Superjam," where she sang James Brown's "Get Up Offa That Thing" with Preservation Hall Jazz Band and Jon Batiste, as well as provided backup vocals for Chance The Rapper's rendition of "Hey Ya!"

Also in 2017, Anderson co-founded Assemble Sound, "a collaboration studio space for local musicians to 'meet, find resources, and ultimately create good art.' Together they raised funds to purchase a church from the 1870’s [sic] and renovated it as a community [space]."

The following year, Ford Motor Company used "Queen" and "Find What You're Looking For" to announce the release of the 2019 Mustang.

Jax Anderson openly entered the LGBT music community in June 2018 with her release "Real Love." That April, Flint Eastwood released a limited-edition merchandise line called Choose Empathy, which included a mug, t-shirt, pin, poster, and a camo fanny pack. A portion of the proceeds supported the Ruth Ellis Center, a residential safe space for runaway, homeless, and at-risk LGBTQ teens in Detroit.

In October, Anderson released of the 6-track EP The Handbook: (THIS IS a COPING MECHANISM FOR a BROKEN HEART) also referred to as The Handbook. The songs were inspired by Anderson's recent romantic breakup. Music videos were released for "Fire," "Hurt," and "Sober." The EP features other collaborators from Assemble Sound, including Shortly, Sienna Liggins, and Jay Prime.

=== Jax Anderson ===
Jax Anderson shed stage names in July 2019, formally announcing that she would perform under her birth name. Speaking with Jerilyn Jordan from the Detroit Metro Times, Anderson explained,

"It was one of those things where it kind of just hit me one day. I basically make music because I want to authentically be myself, and I had gotten to a point where it felt like I was hiding behind a name and hiding behind different costumes, like the big hat. There were these barriers that I had created to protect myself, and I just got to a point where I don't want to be a character. I want to be an artist that's just like, 'This is me, take it or leave it.'"

In 2019, Anderson dropped the EP Heal, which includes the singles "Scared to Death," Fear," and "Hard Times." Along with other artists at Assemble Sound (i.e., Bre-Ann White, GOOD-PALS, Lansuh, Bakpak Durden, and Papier Tabloid), Anderson created six total music videos for this EP.

During the summer of 2020, Anderson began streaming previously unreleased music on Instagram and letting viewers choose which songs she should formally release. Through this practice, Anderson released six music videos ("The Train" featuring jackleendianaeve, "Baptize," "Too Many Cups of Coffee for One Night" featuring Keeks, "Modern Day Hymnal" and "FOCUS"). This practice resulted in Bedroom B-Sides: Volume 1.

In 2020, Jax Anderson also collaborated with Yoke Lore to release "Sensitive Heart," as well as the accompanying music video.

The following year, Jax Anderson announced the release of a new EP, Songs for Every Condition, including "I Don't Care Anymore" (featuring K. Flay) and "Good Day" (featuring MisterWives and Curtis Roach). "Good Day" was used in a commercial for Halo Top Creamery.

Anderson released the seven-song EP No Stress in 2023.

== Discography ==
=== Albums ===
List of album releases, with selected information
Title	Year	Album details	Tracks
Bedroom B-Sides: Volume 1	2020	12 tracks; Released: October 16, 2020; Label: self-released	"Last Song That I'll Ever Write"; "In the Morning"; "Connection"; "Fountain of Youth"; "The Train" (ft. jackleendianaeve); "Postman"; "Too Many Cups of Coffee for One Night" (ft. Keeks); "Baptize"; "I Love You"; "Modern Day Hymnal"; "Focus" (ft. Violents); "5 Year Song"
Songs for Every Condition	2021	10 tracks; Released: October 8, 2021; Label: Neon Gold Records	"Good Day" ft. MisterWives and Curtis Roach; "The Wake Up Call"; "She Can't Get Me High" ft. PVRIS; "She Don't Love Me" ft. Lauren Sanderson; "Say I Do"; "Bigger Picture" ft. Vérité; "Tender" ft. Yoke Lore; "Lungs"; "Changes" ft. joe p; "Dancing Shoes"
No Stress	2023	7 tracks; Released: October 13, 2023; Label: Show & Tell	"No stress"; "Love Myself"; "Kid's Got Love"; "Lazy Talk"; "Overalls & Mini-malls"; "Turn My Brain Off"; "Funeral"

==== Bedroom B-Sides: Volume 1 ====
During the summer of 2020, Anderson began streaming previously unreleased music on Instagram and letting viewers choose which songs she should formally release. Through this practice, Anderson released six music videos (i.e., "The Train" featuring jackleendianaeve, "Baptize," "Too Many Cups of Coffee for One Night" featuring Keeks, "Modern Day Hymnal" & "FOCUS". This practice resulted in Bedroom B-Sides: Volume 1.

Bedroom B-Sides was self-released and includes 12 tracks.

Bedroom B-Sides Tracks
Track No.	Track	Date released
1	"Last Song That I'll Ever Write"	October 15, 2020
2	"In the Morning"	October 15, 2020
3	"Fountain of Youth"	October 15, 2020
4	"The Train" ft. jackleendianaeve	Apr 3, 2020
5	"Postman"	May 22, 2020
6	"Too Many Cups of Coffee for One Night" ft. Keeks	March 27, 2020
7	"Baptize"	April 17, 2020
8	"I Love You"	October 15, 2020
9	"Modern Day Hymnal"	May 1, 2020
10	"Focus" ft. Violents	May 1, 2020
11	"5 Year Song"	October 15, 2020

==== Songs for Every Condition ====
Songs for Every Condition is an album project that Anderson pursued in 2021, wherein she regularly released singles and EPs connected to emotions (e.g., happy or tender). The full album was released October 8, 2021 with Neon Gold Records.

Songs for Every Condition Tracks
Track	Condition	Date released	Notes
"Good Day" ft. MisterWives and Curtis Roach	Hopeful	January 14, 2021 with Neon Gold Records	Music video released April 29, 2021; Featured on Halo Top Creamery commercial
"The Wake Up Call"	Hopeful	January 14, 2021 with Neon Gold Records	
"I Don't Care Anymore" with K. Flay		April 1, 2021 with Neon Gold Records	Music video released April 1, 2021
"She Can't Get Me High" ft. PVRIS	Cloudy	June 4, 2021 with Neon Gold Records	Music video released June 4, 2021
"She Don't Love Me" ft. Lauren Sanderson	Cloudy	June 4, 2021 with Neon Gold Records	Music video released June 25, 2021
"Bigger Picture" ft. Vérité	Happy	July 7, 2021 with Neon Gold Records	Music video released July 7, 2021
"Say I Do" ft. Vérité	Happy	July 7, 2021 with Neon Gold Records	
"Tender" with Yoke Lore	Tender	August 26, 2021 with Neon Gold Records	Music video released Aug 26, 2021

==== No Stress ====
No Stress is an album that Anderson released in 2023, having built up a release of singles starting with "Funeral" in 2022, adding one track to each subsequent release until resulting in the 7-track album.

No Stress Tracks
Track No.	Track	Date released, notes
1	"No Stress"	October 13, 2023; Final track release completing the album
2	"Love Myself"	August 21, 2023; Track released with Love Myself EP
3	"Kid's Got Love"	May 26, 2023; Track released with Kid's Got Love EP
4	"Lazy Talk"	April 6, 2023; Track released with Lazy Talk EP
5	"Overalls & Mini-malls"	March 2, 2023; Track released as single along with "Turn My Brain Off" and "Funeral"
6	"Turn My Brain Off"	January 5, 2023; Track released as single along with "Funeral"
7	"Funeral"	September 29, 2022

=== EPs ===
List of EP releases, with selected information
Title	Year	EP details	Tracks
Apple Trees and Tangerines	2010	10 tracks; Label: self-released	“The River”; “Can You Save Me”; “Escape”; “Secret, Secret”; “Selfish (Lonelier than I Should Be)”; “Sold My Soul (to the Radio)”; “The End”; “When You're Gone”; “Sunday Shoes”; “I Don't Know (Where We Go When We Die)”
Late Nights in Bolo Ties	2013	4 tracks; Released: August 6; Recorded & mixed by Flint Eastwood at The Joyful Jungle; Mastered by Steve Saputo; Album artwork by Phil Selander; Label: self-released	"Secretary"; "Billy the Kid"; "Can You Feel Me Now"; "Shotgun"
Small Victories	2015	6 tracks; Released: October 23; Label: self-released	“Find What You're Looking For”; “Glitches”; “Monster”; “Oblivious”; “God Only Knows”; “Small Victories”
Broke Royalty	2017	7 tracks (2 repeated from previous EP); Released: April 14; Label: Neon Gold Records; Formats: digital download, 10" red vinyl	“Queen”; “Push” (ft. Tunde Olaniran); “Rewind” (ft. GRiZ); “Assemble Kids”; “Glitches”; “Slipping Away”; “Monster”
The Handbook (This is a Coping Mechanism for a Broken Heart	2018	6 tracks; Released: October 25; Label: Assemble Sound	“Chapter 1: Fire” (ft. Sam Austins); “Chapter 2: Hurt” (ft. Siena Liggins); “Chapter 3: Running”; “Chapter 4: Sober” (ft. Shortly); “Chapter 5: Summer Wine“; “Chapter 6: Many Mistakes” (ft. Jaye Prime)
Heal	2019	6 tracks; Released: November 22; Label: Neon Gold Records	"Scared to Death"; "Heal"; "Fear"; "Made"; "Hard Times"; "Satellite"
Kid's Got Love	2023	5 tracks; Released: May 26; Label: Show & Tell	"Kid's Got Love"; "Lazy Talk"; "Overalls & Mini-Malls"; "Turn My Brain Off"; "Funeral"

=== Singles ===
List of singles, showing year released and notes
Year	Title	Album/EP	Notes
2010	"Can You Save Me"	Apple Trees & Tangerines	As POWER; Copyright Universal Network Television; Theme song for Covert Affairs
2010	"Sold My Soul to the Radio"	Apple Trees & Tangerines	As POWER
2012	"Billy the Kid"	Late Nights in Bolo Ties	Featured in the film trailer for To Write Love on Her Arms
2012	"Can You Feel Me Now"	Late Nights in Bolo Ties	Featured on Gotham, Season 3 Episode 5
2012	"Secretary"	Late Nights in Bolo Ties	As Flint Eastwood; Featured on Rhett and Link's Buddy System, Season 1 Episode 1
2015	"The Devil's Gun"	To Write Love on Her Arms (soundtrack)	As Flint Eastwood; Featured in the film To Write Love on Her Arms
2015	"Find What You're Looking For"	Small Victories	As Flint Eastwood; Featured on Ford Motor Company ad for the 2019 Mustang GT 500; Featured on Teen Wolf, Season 6 Episode 2
2015	"Start a Riot"		Featured on Shadowhunters Superfan Suite; Featured on Siren, Season 1 Episode 2; Featured on Famous in Love, Season 1 Episode 1
2016	"Saviors" with Gosh Pith and Syblyng	Non-album single	As Flint Eastwood; Credited as "Gosh Pith · Flint Eastwood · Syblyng"
2017	"Queen"	Broke Royalty	As Flint Eastwood; Featured on The Climb
2017	"Push" ft. Tunde Olaniran	Broke Royalty	As Flint Eastwood
2017	"Monster"	Broke Royalty	As Flint Eastwood
2018	"Real Love"	Non-album single	As Flint Eastwood; Released 22 June for Pride celebrations
2018	"Fire" ft. Sam Austins	The Handbook (This is a Coping Mechanism for a Broken Heart)	As Flint Eastwood
2019	"Fear"	Heal	Released September 27, 2019 with Neon Gold Records
2019	"Scared to Death"	Heal	Released October 24, 2019 with Neon Gold Records
2019	"Hard Times"	Heal	Featured on Batwoman, Season 2, Episode 9
2020	"Sensitive Heart" with Yoke Lore	Non-album single	Released February 14, 2020 with Yellhouse Records
2020	"Eighteen" with BIIANCO	Non-album single	Released August 28, 2020 with Ultra Records
2021	"Good Day" ft. MisterWives and Curtis Roach	Songs for Every Condition	Released January 14, 2021 with Neon Gold Records; Featured on Halo Top Creamery commercial; HOPEFUL release - with "The Wake Up Call"
2021	"I Don't Care Anymore" with K. Flay	Non-album single	Released April 1, 2021 with Neon Golds Records
2021	"Can't Get Me High" ft. PVRIS	Songs for Every Condition	Released June 4, 2021 with Neon Gold Records; CLOUDY release - with "She Don't Love Me" ft. Lauren Sanderson
2021	"Bigger Picture" ft. VÉRITÉ	Songs for Every Condition	Released July 7, 2021 with Neon Gold Records; HAPPY release - with "Say I Do"
2021	"Tender" ft. Yoke Lore	Songs for Every Condition	Released August 26, 2021 with Neon Gold Records
2022	"Funeral"	No Stress	Released September 29, 2022 with Show & Tell
2023	"Turn My Brain Off"	No Stress	Released January 5, 2023 with Show & Tell
2023	"Overalls & Mini-malls"	No Stress	Released March 2, 2023 with Show & Tell
2024	"Hyper Life"	Non-album single	Released October 25, 2024 with Show & Tell
2024	"Toothbrush"	Non-album single	Released December 13, 2024 with Show & Tell

=== Music videos ===
Before committing to her music full-time, Jax Anderson worked in film editing for five years. With this background experience, Anderson directs and edits most of her own music videos. She has also directed music videos for artists such as PVRIS, Matt Maeson, Andrew McMahon, Jagwar Twin, Ray Dalton, and Semler.

Anderson's music videos
Song	Year	Album	Notes
"Queen"	2017	Broke Royalty	Released March 2, 2017
"Push" ft. Tunde Olaniran	2017	Broke Royalty	Released June 15, 2017
"Rewind" ft. GRiZ	2017	Broke Royalty	Released August 29, 2017
"Monster"	2018	Broke Royalty	Released Jan 11, 2018
"Slipping Away"	2018	Broke Royalty	Released April 30, 2018
"Chapter 1: Fire" ft. Sam Austins	2018	The Handbook (This is a Coping Mechanism for a Broken Heart)	Released November 18, 2018
"Chapter 2: Hurt" ft. Siena Liggins	2019	The Handbook (This is a Coping Mechanism for a Broken Heart)	Released February 3, 2019
"Chapter 4: Sober"	2019	The Handbook (This is a Coping Mechanism for a Broken Heart)	Released February 12, 2019
"Hard Times"	2019	Heal	Released August 23, 2019, with Neon Gold Records
"Fear"	2019	Heal	Released October 10, 2019, with Neon Gold Records
"Scared to Death"	2019	Heal	Released October 24, 2019, with Neon Gold Records
"Heal"	2019	Heal	Released November 22, 2019, with Neon Gold Records
"Scared to Death (LIVE in Sedona)"	2020	Heal	Released January 21, 2020, with Neon Gold Records
"Heal (LIVE in Oregon)"	2020	Heal	Released February 6, 2020, with Neon Gold Records
"Satellite"	2020		Released February 26, 2020, with Neon Gold Records
"Sensitive Heart" ft. Yoke Lore	2020		Released February 14, 2020
"Too Many Cups of Coffee for One Night" ft. Keeks	2020	Bedroom B-Sides: Volume 1	Released March 27, 2020
"The Train" ft. jackleendianaeve	2020	Bedroom B-Sides: Volume 1	Released April 3, 2020
"Baptize"	2020	Bedroom B-Sides: Volume 1	Released April 17, 2020
"Modern Day Hymnal" & "FOCUS" ft. Violents	2020	Bedroom B-Sides: Volume 1	Released May 1, 2020
"Postman"	2020	Bedroom B-Sides: Volume 1	Released May 22, 2020
"In the Morning"	2020	Bedroom B-Sides: Volume 1	Released October 16, 2020
"I Don't Care Anymore" with K. Flay	2021	Songs for Every Condition	Released April 1, 2021, with Neon Gold
"Good Day" with MisterWives and Curtis Roach	2021	Songs for Every Condition	Released April 29, 2021, with Neon Gold
"She Can't Get Me High" ft. PVRIS	2021	Songs for Every Condition	Released June 4, 2021, with Neon Gold
"She Don't Love Me" ft. Lauren Sanderson	2021	Songs for Every Condition	Released June 25, 2021, with Neon Gold
"Bigger Picture" ft. Vérité	2021	Songs for Every Condition	Released July 7, 2021, with Neon Gold
"Changes"	2021	Songs for Every Condition	Released October 7, 2021
"Tender" ft. Yoke Lore	2021	Songs for Every Condition	Released August 25, 2021
"The Wake Up Call"	2021	Songs for Every Condition	Released November 30, 2021
"Funeral"	2022	No Stress	Released October 25, 2022
"Overalls & Mini-malls"	2023	No Stress	Released March 21, 2023
"Lazy Talk"	2023	No Stress	Released May 23, 2023
"Toothbrush"	2024		Released December 18, 2024

== Personal life ==
Anderson is queer. The singer came out with the release of the single "Real Love," which was written after "her childhood pastor won an award for performing gay conversion therapy." When asked about the song-writing experience, Anderson stated,

Some of my songs that I love the most have come from a place of frustration and angst... My whole life I was taught that if you follow Christianity you produce these things called the fruits of the spirit, which is love, joy, peace, patience, etc. You can have all these things – but not if you're gay. But I found all these things they said I couldn't find – I found them by being true to myself when I came out to everyone around me and told them, 'Yo, I'm extremely queer.' I found a lot of happiness in it, and I felt a lot of love and joy and acceptance and peace, just by being myself. Sometimes that's a really hard thing to do. So for me personally some of my best art comes from angst.

Anderson is also blind in her left eye.
