= Mike Diva =

American film director

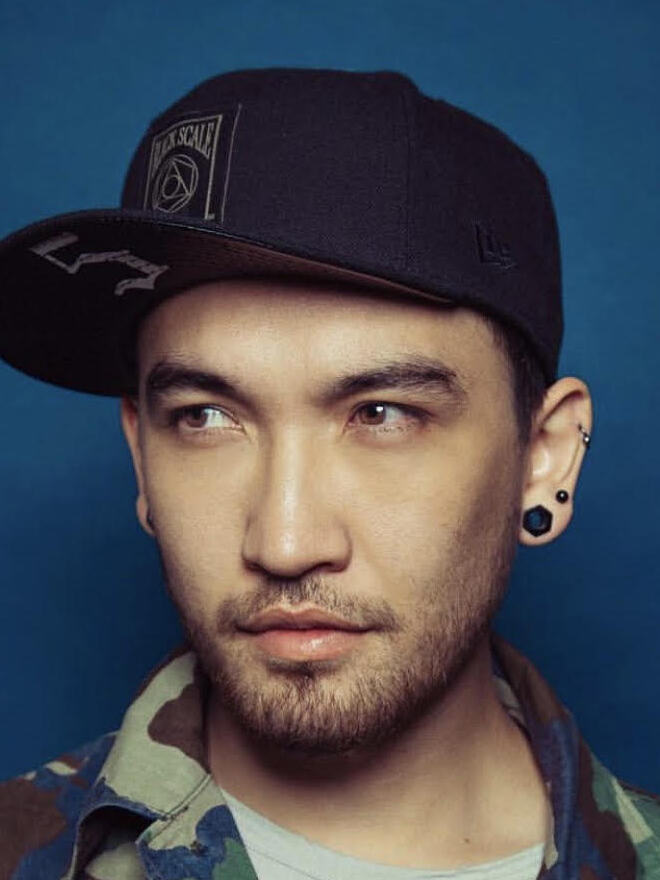
- Diva in 2018
- Born: Michael Brenton Dahlquist; June 23, 1987 (age 39); Sacramento, California, U.S
- Occupations: Film director, visual effects artist, musician and YouTuber
- Website: www.mikediva.lol

Michael Brenton Dahlquist (born June 23, 1987), known professionally as Mike Diva, is an American film director, visual effects artist, musician, and YouTuber. After establishing his YouTube channel in 2006, he created multiple internet videos that went viral on the platform, one of which being Japanese Donald Trump Commercialトランプ2016, a Japanese styled politically satirical video disguised as a campaign commercial for Donald Trump's 2016 presidential campaign, which gained international attention. He was also in a band called Vyncent Flaw or originally Jasper Dorex Cyborg Esquire.

Diva has directed YouTube videos for Epic Rap Battles of History, music videos for 3OH!3, Kill the Noise, The M Machine, Mindless Self Indulgence, Savant, Lil Nas X, Doja Cat, and Run the Jewels, segments of Saturday Night Live, commercials and other promotional materials for Xbox, Mixer, Halo Top Creamery, and the Los Angeles County Metropolitan Transportation Authority. He also directed the Netflix special The Unauthorized Bash Brothers Experience.

== Early life and career ==
Mike Brenton Dahlquist was born on June 23, 1987, in Sacramento, California. He was introduced to filmmaking at the age of 14 after downloading VFX software from LimeWire.

In June 2016, Diva's video Japanese Donald Trump Commercialトランプ2016 gained international attention, with some 8 million views on Facebook and almost 300,000 views on YouTube in its first 24 hours. The video is presented as a Japanese commercial promoting the Republican presidential candidate Donald Trump. The video was shot over a month and a half with virtually no budget and stars the cosplayer and wig stylist known as sushimonstuh. Slate described the work as "a dizzying, sorbet-hued phantasmagoria that gestures toward the coming end times."

On August 11, 2016, Diva directed a similar politically satirical video for Super Deluxe about the Democratic presidential candidate Hillary Clinton. The video depicted a fictionalized Clinton attempting to connect with the millennial generation using various internet memes.

In 2017, Diva co-wrote and directed a stylized horror spot for Halo Top Creamery titled "Eat The Ice Cream," The advert made headlines in Adweek, AdAge, IndieWire, Munchies and Gizmodo. It won a number of awards, including AdWeek's Top 10 Ads of 2017.

In 2021, Diva moved to New York City and began directing video shorts for Saturday Night Live.

== Artistry ==
Diva is known for incorporating various aspects of Internet culture and Vaporwave aesthetics on his films. He is inspired by Japanese commercials, as well as Michel Gondry, and the Daniels.

== Personal life ==
Diva previously lived in Los Angeles, currently residing in New York City.

== Awards and nominations ==
Year	Work	Award	Category	Result
2013	Mike Diva Presents	3rd Streamy Awards	Best Direction	Nominated
2013	Kill the Noise "Kill The Noise pt. 1"	MTV Clubland	Pick of the year	Won
2015	Thresher	Comicpalooza Film Festival	Best Horror Film	Won
2015	Savant "Kali 47"	Comicpalooza Film Festival	Best VFX	Won
2015	Savant "Kali 47"	2015 Geeky Awards	Music Video of the Year	Won
2015	Savant "Kali 47"	Dragon*Con Independent Film Festival	Jury Award	Won
2015	Savant "Kali 47"	Steampunk Chronicle Reader's Choice Awards	Best Short Film	Won
2015	Savant "Kali 47"	Steampunk Chronicle Reader's Choice Awards	Music Video	Won
2016	Savant "Kali 47"	Amarcort Film Festival	Special Mention Award	Won
2016	Savant "Kali 47"	FANCINE Festival de Cine Fantastico de la Universidad de Malaga	Audience Award	Won
2016	Savant "Kali 47"	Fantastic Planet Film Festival	Best Music Video	Won
2016	Savant "Kali 47"	London Short Series Fest	Jury Award	Won
2016	Savant "Kali 47"	Long Island International Film Expo	Jury Award	Won
2016	Savant "Kali 47"	Outlaw Film Festival	Jury Award	Won
2017	Halo Top Creamery "Eat The Ice Cream"	EPICA Award	Humour in Advertising	Bronze
2017	Halo Top Creamery "Eat The Ice Cream"	The 10 Best Ads of 2017	Advertising	Won
2018	Halo Top Creamery "Eat The Ice Cream"	AdWheel Grand Award	Best Marketing and Communications Educational Effort	Won
2018	Halo Top Creamery "Eat The Ice Cream"	People's Voice Award Winner	Advertising, Media, & PR: Branded Content	Won
2018	Halo Top Creamery "Eat The Ice Cream"	American Advertising Awards (ADDY)	Internet Commercial (District 15)	Silver
2018	Halo Top Creamery "Eat The Ice Cream"	American Advertising Awards (ADDY)	Internet Commercial (Los Angeles)	Silver
2018	Halo Top Creamery "Eat The Ice Cream"	D&AD Awards	Digital Marketing / Online Video Adverts	Won
2021	Run the Jewels "No Save Point"	Webby Awards	Best Editing	Nominated
