= Tightrope (disambiguation) =

Tightrope walking is the art of walking along a thin wire or rope.

Tightrope or Tight rope may also refer to:

== Entertainment ==
=== Film and television ===
- Tightrope (film), a 1984 film starring Clint Eastwood
- Tightrope (1960 film), a French drama film
- Tightrope!, a 1959–60 American television series starring Mike Connors
- Tightrope Pictures, British television production company
- "Tightrope" (Doc), a 2025 television episode

=== Albums ===
- Tight Rope (album), a 1999 album by Brooks & Dunn
- Tightrope (EP), an EP by American rock band Walk the Moon
- Tightrope (Steve Khan album), a 1977 album by Steve Khan
- Tightrope (Stephanie McIntosh album), 2006
- Tightrope Walker (album), an album by Rachael Yamagata
- Tightrope, a 1986 album by Anthem
- Tightrope, a 1993 live album by the Irish rock band The Stunning

=== Songs ===
- "Tight Rope" (song), a 1972 song by Leon Russell
- "Tightrope" (Electric Light Orchestra song), 1976
- "Tightrope" (Illy song), 2014
- "Tightrope" (Janelle Monáe song), 2010
- "Tightrope" (Stephanie McIntosh song), 2006
- "Tightrope" (Walk the Moon song), 2012
- "Tightrope", from the album Lost on You by LP
- "Tightrope", from the album Minus the Machine by 10 Years
- "Tightrope", B-side from CD single "In Your Eyes" by Kylie Minogue
- "Tightrope", hidden track from the album Infest by Papa Roach
- "Tightrope", from the album Prisoner by Ryan Adams
- "Tightrope", from the album In Step by Stevie Ray Vaughan
- "Tightrope", from the album Second Coming by The Stone Roses
- "Tightrope", from the album BB/Ang3l by Tinashe
- "Tightrope", from the compilation album Dark Was the Night by Yeasayer
- "Tightrope", from the album Nobody Is Listening by Zayn
- "Tight Rope", from the album Around the Sun by Jeff Watson
- "Tight Rope", from the album Comalies by Lacuna Coil

== Other ==
- Tightrope (novel), a 1999 children's book by Gillian Cross
- Tightrope Books, a Canadian independent book publisher based in Toronto
- Tightrope Walker (sculpture), a 1979 bronze sculpture by Dutch artist Kees Verkade
- Tightrope, a 2015 novel by Simon Mawer
- Tightrope, part of Operation Dominic I and II, the last atmospheric nuclear test by the United States, in 1962
- The Tight Rope, a podcast
