= Tight =

Tight may refer to:

== Clothing ==
- Skin-tight garment, a garment that is held to the skin by elastic tension
- Tights, a type of leg coverings fabric extending from the waist to feet
- Tightlacing, the practice of wearing a tightly-laced corset
- "Tighties", a slang term for tight cycling shorts.
- "Tighty-whiteys", American slang for men’s or boys' briefs

== Mathematics ==
- Tight frame, a mathematical term defining the bounding conditions of a vector space
- Tightness of measures, a concept in measure (and probability) theory

== Music ==
- Tight (Mindless Self Indulgence album), 1999
- Tight (Hank Crawford album), 1996
- "Tight" (song), a song by INXS
- "Tight", a song by The Coup from their 2001 album Party Music

== Science and technology ==
- Tight gas, natural gas which is difficult to access
- Tight oil, shale oil which is difficult to access
- American car racing term for when the car is understeering

== Slang ==
- Miser
- Drunkenness
- Cool (aesthetic)
- Close-knit

== Other uses ==
- High and tight, a hairstyle typical in the U.S. military
- Tight end, an offensive position in American football
- Tight playing style, a poker strategy

== See also ==
- Tight rope (disambiguation)
- Tightness (disambiguation)
