= Tightrope (Walk the Moon song) =

Single by Walk the Moon

from the album Walk the Moon
- Released: September 11, 2012
- Studio: Doppler (Atlanta, Georgia); Maze (Atlanta, Georgia)
- Genre: Pop rock
- Length: 3:29
- Label: RCA
- Songwriters: Nicholas Petricca; Eli Maiman; Kevin Ray; Sean Waugaman; Chris Robinson
- Producer: Ben Allen

Walk the Moon singles chronology
"Anna Sun" (2012)	"Tightrope" (2012)	"Shut Up and Dance" (2014)

Music video
- "Tightrope" on YouTube

"Tightrope" is a song by American rock band Walk the Moon from their first major-label album Walk the Moon (2012). The song was written by Nicholas Petricca, Eli Maiman, Kevin Ray, Sean Waugaman and Chris Robinson, with Ben Allen handling the production. The song was sent to US modern rock radio stations through RCA Records as the album's second single on September 11, 2012. An extended play of the same name was later released in 2013.

== Background ==
"Tightrope" was written by all four members of Walk the Moon and Chris Robinson. The band enlisted Ben Allen to produce the track for their debut studio album, Walk the Moon (2012). Speaking about the difference in the writing for their new material compared to the songs from their independently released I Want! I Want! (2010), Guitarist Eli Maiman said that it "com[es] from a different place entirely" and that the band drew from "new influences and new experiences", resulting in "a more mature vibe [and] element to it". He also mentioned that the song was evident of how he and lead singer Nicholas Petricca had "found a cool way of interacting between synthesizers and guitars".

== Composition ==
"Tightrope" is an upbeat pop rock song that, along with the rest of Walk the Moon, incorporates bright and vibrant production. It is made up of intermingling bass, synth lines and squealing guitar with a chorus that goes "woah-oh-oh-oh". Maiman described the track's melody as like "a conversation between the guitar and the keyboards". Consequence of Sound's Paul De Revere wrote that the sound of the song "suggest[s] Television on a playground with Talking Heads and Tom Tom Club".

== Release and reception ==
"Tightrope" first appeared on the three-track sampler Anna Sun EP, released on February 7, 2012. It was sent to US modern rock stations on September 11, 2012, through RCA Records as the second single from Walk the Moon. A remix of the song by J. Viewz was included on the expanded edition of the album. On January 22, 2013, an extended play of the same name was released to digital retailers. The EP included both the studio version and a live version of the track.

In his review of the Anna Sun EP, Paul De Revere of Consequence of Sound felt that "Tightrope" did not match the elated catchiness of its title track but that it did rival it. The staff of Alternative Addiction deemed that the song "has the potential to be a terrific second single". Anthony Soredino of AbsolutePunk said that the track made for a "great addition to the WTM arsenal". Conversely, Dani Beck and Derek Robertson of DIY criticized the song for being "undefinable, inconsistent wannabe alt-pop".

== Chart performance ==
"Tightrope" debuted at number 40 on Billboard's Alternative Songs chart. It eventually peaked at number 15 in the issue dated February 1, 2013, becoming Walk the Moon's second top twenty chart hit after "Anna Sun". The song was additionally the Hot Shot Debut of the week on the Rock Airplay chart, entering at number 48 before reaching number 33. Outside both of those charts, it peaked at number 21 on the Adult Alternative Songs chart and number 27 on the Hot Rock Songs chart.

== Music videos ==
A screenshot from the second "Tightrope" music video

Two different music videos for "Tightrope" exist. The first video was uploaded on Walk the Moon's Vevo account on June 15, 2012, as part of their self-made "7in7" series. The band filmed this video, along with six others for songs from their self-titled album, over seven days while on tour without a film crew or a budget.

The second music video, directed by Ari Costa, was released on October 5, 2012. It was plotted out for the band and shot on a free day in Los Angeles. The video, which makes use of the movable walls motif, seemingly delves into Petricca's imagination, involving "a chaotic, D.I.Y. stage set of face-painted humans pretending to be animals". Petricca and the other members of Walk the Moon sing and stare into the camera as they are occasionally joined in by red-painted spirit fingers. The band contort their faces into spastic expressions while sporting their own face paint.

Rachel Brodsky of MTV lauded the second music video as "downright determined to be pure, unadulterated sunshine".

== Usage in media ==
- "Tightrope" was used in a commercial for the HP Envy 4 Ultrabook computer.
- The song was featured in the game Saints Row IV.

== Credits and personnel ==
Credits adapted from the liner notes of Walk the Moon.

Locations

- Recorded at Doppler Studios and Maze Studios, Atlanta, Georgia
- Mixed at The Ballroom Studio, Los Angeles, California
- Mastered at Marcussen Mastering, Hollywood, California

Personnel

- Nick Petricca – vocals, keyboards, percussion, songwriting
- Kevin Ray – bass, vocals, songwriting
- Sean Waugaman – percussion, vocals, ray-gun, songwriting
- Eli Maiman – guitar, vocals, songwriting
- Adrian Galvin – songwriting
- Nick Lerangis – songwriting
- Adam Reifsnyder – songwriting
- Chris Robinson – songwriting
- Ben Allen – production
- TJ Elias – assistant engineer
- Will Thrift – assistant engineer
- Mark Needham – mixing
- Will Brierre – mixing assistant
- Stephen Marcussen – mastering

== Charts ==
Chart (2012–13)	Peak position
US Hot Rock & Alternative Songs (Billboard)	27
US Rock & Alternative Airplay (Billboard)	33

== Release history ==
Region	Date	Format	Label	Ref.
United States	September 11, 2012	Modern rock radio	RCA Records	
