= Siena Liggins =

American pop musician (born 1994)

- Born: April 27, 1994 (age 32); Saginaw, Michigan, U.S.
- Genres: Pop; R&B
- Years active: 2018–present
- Label: Assemble Sound
- Website: www.sienaliggins.com

Siena Liggins (born April 27, 1994) is an Atlanta-based pop musician.

== Early life ==
Born in Michigan, Liggins grew up in a military family and lived in multiple states throughout her youth. As a child in North Carolina, she was in the Martin Luther King Jr. All Children's Choir at her mother's demands. Although she did not enjoy the choir, she learned how to read sheet music there. Her uncle, a rapper, had a home studio in her grandmother's basement, which he let Liggins use to record her own track in middle school. Liggins continued to write music in her spare time. After returning to Michigan for the end of high school, Liggins studied at the Detroit Institute of Music Education and started but did not finish college at NYU Steinhardt, as she decided to pursue music full time.

== Career ==
Liggins began writing for artists at Assemble Sound, a Detroit-based development hub for independent musicians, and was eventually noticed by enough producers to release her debut single, "Flowerbomb". Like much of her music, "Flowerbomb" references a real situation Liggins experienced.

Following her debut, Liggins toured supporting Flint Eastwood. Liggins continues to release music with Assemble Sound, including using their space to build sets for her music videos. Her music, usually themed around her romantic or sexual relationships with women, is often featured on Billboard Pride.

In April 2021, Liggins released her debut album, Ms. Out Tonight. Liggins stated she released Ms. Out Tonight as a visual album "in order to really drive the point home: it's beyond time to disrupt the norms and there's room in the pop space for all of us."

Liggins moved from Detroit to Atlanta in 2021. She released her next single, "3 Bad," in 2023, to be a part of her next album Floozy. Billboard's Stephen Daw described the track as "a deeply introspective, chaotically sad breakup song," while Earmilk's Malkiva Padin called it "a relatable exploration of unhealthy coping mechanisms wrapped up in luscious hyper-pop soundscape."

In 2025, Liggins went on tour supporting XANA.

== Artistry ==
=== Influences ===
Liggins is inspired by TLC, Usher and Britney Spears.

=== Style ===
Liggins strives to make her music "provocative, but beautiful". Her music generally combines "cocky" lyrics with a soft voice and playful production.

== Personal life ==
Liggins is a lesbian.

== Discography ==
=== Albums ===
Title
Ms. Out Tonight
Album details
- Released: April 27, 2021
- Label: Siena Liggins with Assemble Sound
- Formats: Digital download, streaming
Notes

Track listing
No.	Title	Length
1.	"Girlfriend"	2:50
2.	"Ms. Out Tonight"	3:09
3.	"Blush"	2:41
4.	"Dirty Girl (with Yung Baby Tate)"	3:29
5.	"No Valet"	2:53
6.	"Beach Butts"	2:57
7.	"thicc"	1:00
8.	"Lazy"	2:41
9.	"Flowerbomb"	3:10
10.	"First Time"	3:02
11.	"Ooh Ahh"	3:39
12.	"Ur Place"	2:30
Total length:		34:07

=== Singles ===
Title	Year
"3 Bad"	2023
"Safeword"	2020
"Perfect"	2020
"Looks Don't Lie"	2020
"Wait on Me"	2020
"My Girl"	2019
"Laws of Attraction"	2019
"Me Again"	2018
"Naked"	2018
"Flowerbomb"	2018
