= Tantrums (Xana album) =

Studio album by Xana
- Released: April 15, 2022
- Genres: Pop; pop-rock
- Length: 42:00
- Label: Nettwerk Music Group
- Director: Lindsey Blane
- Producers: Liam Moes; Xana Morris; Shane Stephenson

Xana chronology
Tantrums (2022)	The Sex Was Good Until It Wasn't (2024)

Singles from Tantrums
- 1. "Kitchen Light"; 2. "Yellow"

Tantrums is the debut album of Canadian singer songwriter Xana. Released in spring of 2022. Three of the songs off of the album are a part of Xana's "Jodie Series". One of these songs, "Kitchen Light" amassed millions of views on TikTok. The album discuses Xana's past relationships and touches on themes of queer empowerment.

== Background ==
After releasing her debut single "Goddess" in late 2020, which has over million streams on Spotify. Through the social media platform TikTok, Xana began to amass an audience, she followed up with a second single "Pray".

In June 2021, Xana released the first single, "Yellow" from her upcoming project. In July she released another single, "Kitchen Light". Xana posted the song to TikTok with the caption "If Taylor Swift wrote an explicitly gay song", where it became a massive success. On April 15, 2022, Xana released her debut album Tantrums. On September 28, Xana released the music video for the song "19", directed by Lindsey Blane.

Xana recorded another single "Tipsy" intended to be part of the album but ultimately decided to release it as a standalone.

== Composition and themes ==
In 2019, Xana discovered Vancouver based music producers Liam Moes and Shane Stephenson and began working with them in early 2020. She would turn to these producers for the creation of her debut album, while planning the album, Stephenson remarked "You're throwing tantrums so other people don't have to" about Xana, and this quote lead to the album being titled Tantrums.

The album tells the story of past relationships Xana went through and incorporates themes of female sexuality and LGBTQ romance, the opening track "i did this all for you" is even described by Xtra Magazine as "The Best Queer Song of April". The song "My Therapist Told Me", incorporates electric guitar and drums for a pop-rock anthem of a temper tantrum. In the song Xana describes a situation where a girl she was flirting with told her they were "just friends", but Xana didn't want to write a sad song about the situation.

The music video for "19" features Maia Cervellin as Xana's girlfriend "Jodie", in the fifth and final video in Xana's "Jodie Series" which also includes the music video for singles "Yellow", and "Kitchen Light".

== Track listing ==
All lyrics are written by Xana Morris.

No.	Title	Music	Producer	Length
1.	"i did this all for you"	Liam Moes; Morris; Shane Stephenson	Moes; Stephenson	2:43
2.	"12 missed calls"	Morris; Stephenson	Stephenson	3:38
3.	"Once More, With Feeling!"	Morris	Stephenson	1:50
4.	"Kitchen Light"	Morris	Stephenson	4:16
5.	"Love Like This"	Moes; Morris	Moes	3:43
6.	"Yellow"	Moes; Morris	Moes	3:41
7.	"Cupid"	Moes; Morris; Stephenson	Moes	4:44
8.	"the blue room interlude"	Moes; Morris; Stephenson	Moes; Stephenson	1:54
9.	"Complex"	Moes; Morris	Moes	3:31
10.	"My Therapist Told ME"	Moes; Morris; Stephenson	Moes; Stephenson	2:58
11.	"so it's ur birthday"	Moes; Morris	Moes	3:42
12.	"19"	Moes; Morris; Stephenson	Moes; Stephenson	6:02
Total length:				42:00

Credits adapted from Spotify.
