= Tightness =

Tightness may refer to:

In mathematics,

- Tightness of (a collection of) measures is a concept in measure (and probability) theory
- Tightness (topology) is also a cardinal function used in general topology

In economics,

- Tightness refers to the degree to which the number of unemployed workers exceed the number of posted job vacancies (or vice versa).
- Market tightness, a point in time where it is very difficult to invest, but it is far easier to sell or to remove investments in return of monetary rewards

In other fields,

- Tightness of a rope indicates the rope is under tension
- Tightness of a sealing means it is impermeable, that it seals well
- Tightness is the art of being 'tight' (i.e., stingy or miserly)
- Tightness can refer to something being cool

== See also ==
- Tight (disambiguation)
