= Tunde Olaniran =

Musician from Flint, Michigan

Tunde Olaniran is a musician from Flint, Michigan. In 2014, Olaniran released their first EP titled Yung Archetype (see: Jungian archetypes). Olaniran released their first full-length album in 2015 titled Transgressor. In 2018, Olaniran released their second full-length album titled Stranger. Olaniran is gender nonconforming, and their pronouns are they/them. They are an American of Nigerian descent.

== Discography ==
=== Studio albums ===
List of Album releases, with selected information
Title	Year	Album details	Track listing
Transgressor	2015	12 tracks; Release Date: August 7; Label: Quite Scientific Records; Length: 51 minutes	"Transgressor"; "Let Me Go"; "KYBM"; "Namesake"; "Up & Down"; "Everyone's Missing"; "Run to the Gun"; "Don't Cry" ft. Invincible; "Paladin"; "Diamonds" ft. iRAWniQ & Passalacqua; "Brighter Days"; "24KT"
Stranger	2018	13 tracks; Release Date: October 15; Label: Magic Wheel; Length: 44 minutes	"Stranger"; "Mountain"; "Dead Last"; "I'm Here"; "Miracle"; "Vulnerable"; "Forgiveness"; "Celine Dion"; "Hungry"; "Coins"; "No Enemies"; "Symbol"; "The World"
Ephemerrreality	2022	12 tracks; Release Date: September 9; Label: Length: 33 minutes 7 seconds	"Evergreen"; "Whipped Cream Daydream"; "Done Done"; "Long Way"; "Bad World"; "Sauce Swag Drip"; "On My Name"; "Propane"; "Candles"; "Crying at the Beach"; "Cry Me Down"; "Vibration"

=== EPs ===
List of EP releases, with selected information
Title	Year	EP Details	Track listing
Yung Archetype	2014	5 tracks; Release Date: February 25; Label: Quite Scientific Records; Length: 20 minutes	"Brown Boy"; "The Highway"; "The Raven"; "The Internet" ft. James Linck; "Critical"
Brown Boy (Remixes)	2014	5 tracks; Release Date: January 28; Label: Quite Scientific Records; Length: 22 minutes	"Brown Boy"; "Brown Boy" (Revoir Remix); "Brown Boy" (Ancient Language Remix); "Brown Boy" (Jon Zott Remix)
Let Me Tell You (Kd Music Summer Anthem Summer 2013) (Remixes) with George Vala	2013	3 tracks; Release Date: September 23; Label: KD Music; Length: 17 minutes	"Let Me Tell You"; "Let Me Tell You" (Darlyn Vlys Remix); "Let Me Tell You" (Radio Mix)
The Second Transgression	2012	5 tracks; Release Date: December 21; Label: Self-released; Length: 19 minutes	"2.0" ft. Jonny 5; "Autonomous"; "Sun Goes Down"; "Kill or Be Killed"; "Brown Boy"

=== Singles ===
List of Singles, with selected information
Title	Year	Album	Song Details
"WDWHI"	2020		Release Date: November 13; Non-album release; Label: Self-released
"Jean Grey"	2019		Release Date: May 31; Non-album release; Label: Self-released
"Show You What I Can Do"	2019		Release Date: February 26; Non-album release; Label: Round Hill Records
"Mountain" ft. Mother Nature, Ché, GNUČČI & iRAWniq [Remix]	2018	Stranger	Release Date: October 26; Label: Self-released
"Mountain"	2018	Stranger	Release Date: August 22; Label: Magic Wheel
"I'm Here"	2018	Stranger	Release Date: July 13; Label: Magic Wheel
"Vulnerable"	2018	Stranger	Release Date: April 6; Label: Magic Wheel
"Symbol"	2017	Stranger	Release Date: September 7; Label: Magic Wheel
"Cobra"	2011		Release Date: February 15; Label: Self-released
