= Invincible (rapper) =

American rapper

- Also known as: Ill Weaver
- Born: Ilana Weaver; 1980 or 1981 (age 44–45); Urbana, Illinois, U.S.
- Origin: Detroit, Michigan, U.S.
- Genre: Political hip-hop
- Label: Emergence Media

Ilana Weaver (Hebrew: אילנה ויבר; born 1980 or 1981), also known as Ill Weaver and more commonly by their stage name Invincible, is an American and Israeli rapper based in Detroit.

== Early life ==
Weaver's mother is Israeli, and their father is from St. Louis, Missouri. When they were one year old, they moved to Israel, returning to the United States at the age of 7. Their first language was Hebrew; they learned English from hip-hop music as a child and stopped speaking Hebrew by age ten. Upon their return to the United States, they first lived in Ann Arbor, Michigan, then moved to Detroit.

At age 15, Weaver started performing at open mic nights and getting into Detroit's battle scene in its late-1990s heyday. Weaver's passion for activism was sparked when members of the Ku Klux Klan gathered and spoke at Ann Arbor's city hall. Invincible was disgusted with what they heard, but felt they could not do anything about it.

== Career ==
Beginning in 1997, Invincible was a member of the Anomalies crew. They collaborated with Finale, Suheir Hammad, Marco Polo, Tunde Olaniran, and Waajeed of the Platinum Pied Pipers.

In 2008, Invincible released their debut album, ShapeShifters, via Emergence, a record label they co-founded. In 2010, Invincible performed at the Can A Sista Rock a Mic? festival in Washington, D.C. That same year, Invincible received attention after the music video for "Ropes" was banned on mtvU, MTV's college-targeted channel, after it was deemed "too problematic" because of its theme of suicide. The ban was later lifted. Also around this time, Invincible worked in youth organizing with Detroit Summer's Live Arts Media Project and the US-Palestine Youth Solidarity Network.

== Personal life ==
Weaver identifies as gender-nonconforming, and uses they/them pronouns. They hold American and Israeli citizenship. Weaver is anti-Zionist and a critic of Israel.
