= I Want! I Want! =

Studio album by Walk the Moon
- Released: November 16, 2010
- Length: 47:05

Walk the Moon chronology
I Want! I Want! (2010)	Walk the Moon (2012)

I Want! I Want! (stylized in all lowercase) is the debut album by the American rock band Walk the Moon. It was self-released by the band.

== Track listing ==
No.	Title	Length
1.	"Anna Sun"	5:21
2.	"Lisa Baby"	3:50
3.	"Quesadilla"	3:06
4.	"The Liftaway"	4:33
5.	"i want! i want!"	4:58
6.	"Blue Dress"	3:57
7.	"Jenny"	4:18
8.	"Me + All My Friends"	4:40
9.	"Iscariot"	7:02
10.	"I Can Lift a Car"	4:56
11.	"William Blake"	3:12
Total length:		47:05

== Personnel ==
Walk the Moon

- Nicholas Petricca – lead vocals, keyboards, percussion
- Nicholas Lerangis – guitar, backing vocals
- Adam Reifsnyder – bass, backing vocals
- Adrian Galvin – drums, backing vocals, percussion
- Sean Waugaman – additional percussion
