= Walk the Moon (album) =

Studio album by Walk the Moon
- Released: June 19, 2012
- Genre: New wave, dance-rock
- Length: 43:00
- Label: RCA
- Producer: Ben Allen

Walk the Moon chronology
I want! I want! (2010)	Walk the Moon (2012)	Talking Is Hard (2014)

Singles from Walk the Moon
- 1. "Anna Sun" Released: February 7, 2012; 2. "Tightrope" Released: September 11, 2012

Professional ratings
Aggregate scores
Source	Rating
Metacritic	67/100
Review scores
Source	Rating
AllMusic	4/5 stars
AbsolutePunk	8.7/10
Consequence of Sound	D−
DIY	5/10
Entertainment Weekly	B
Sputnikmusic	3.5/5

Walk the Moon is the second studio album by American rock band Walk the Moon. It was released on June 19, 2012, by RCA Records. The first single, "Anna Sun", peaked at number 10 on the Billboard Alternative chart and number 20 on the Billboard Rock Songs chart.

== Track listing ==
Walk the Moon – Standard edition
No.	Title	Writer(s)	Length
1.	"Quesadilla"	Nicholas Petricca; Adrian Galvin; Nick Lerangis; Adam Reifsnyder	3:15
2.	"Lisa Baby"	Petricca; Galvin; Lerangis; Reifsnyder	3:53
3.	"Next in Line"	Petricca; Eli Maiman; Kevin Ray; Sean Waugaman	4:00
4.	"Anna Sun"	Petricca; Galvin; Lerangis; Reifsnyder	5:21
5.	"Tightrope"	Petricca; Maiman; Ray; Waugaman; Chris Robinson	3:31
6.	"Jenny"	Petricca	4:05
7.	"Shiver Shiver"	Petricca; Maiman; Ray; Waugaman; Robinson	3:53
8.	"Lions"	Petricca; Maiman	0:35
9.	"Iscariot"	Petricca	5:24
10.	"Fixin'"	Petricca; Maiman; Ray; Waugaman	4:22
11.	"I Can Lift a Car"	Petricca	4:49
Total length:			43:09

Walk the Moon – Expanded edition (bonus tracks)
No.	Title	Writer(s)	Length
12.	"Anywayican"	Petricca; Maiman; Ray; Waugaman	3:41
13.	"Tête-à-tête"	Petricca; Maiman; Ray; Waugaman	2:52
14.	"Drunk in the Woods"	Petricca; Maiman; Ray; Waugaman	2:49
15.	"Tightrope" (Acoustic)	Petricca; Maiman; Ray; Waugaman; Robinson	3:29
16.	"Burning Down the House" (Live)	David Byrne; Chris Frantz; Jerry Harrison; Tina Weymouth	3:51
17.	"Tightrope" (J. Viewz Remix)	Petricca; Maiman; Ray; Waugaman; Robinson	4:03
18.	"Shiver Shiver" (Bells & Whistles Mix)	Petricca; Maiman; Ray; Waugaman; Robinson	3:45
Total length:			1:07:38

Walk the Moon – 10th Anniversary vinyl
No.	Title	Writer(s)	Length
12.	"William Blake" (hidden track)	Petricca; Galvin; Lerangis; Reifsnyder	3:08
Total length:			46:17

== Personnel ==
=== Walk the Moon ===
- Nicholas Petricca – lead vocals, keyboards, percussion
- Eli Maiman – guitar, backing vocals
- Kevin Ray – bass, backing vocals
- Sean Waugaman – drums, backing vocals, percussion

=== Additional musicians ===
- Lindsay Brandt – backing vocals, hand claps, sunshine on "Quesadilla"
- Mark Needham – cowboy boots on "Iscariot"
- Dustin Chow – additional drum programming on "I Can Lift a Car"

=== Production ===
- Producer – Ben Allen
- Mixing – Mark Needham

== Charts ==
Chart performance for Walk the Moon
Chart (2012)	Peak position
Australian Hitseekers Albums (ARIA)	13
UK Albums (OCC)	115
US Billboard 200	36
US Top Alternative Albums (Billboard)	8
US Top Rock Albums (Billboard)	15
