= Wells Enterprises =

American food company

Wells Enterprises, Inc.
- Type: Private
- Founded: 1913; 113 years ago
- Founder: Fred Wells
- Headquarters: Le Mars, Iowa, U.S.
- Key people: Liam Killeen, CEO
- Owner: Ferrero SpA
- Website: WellsEnterprisesInc.com

Wells Enterprises, Inc. is an American food company and the largest ice cream manufacturer in the United States, based in Le Mars, Iowa. It is the maker of Blue Bunny frozen dairy dessert.

Wells is the second largest ice cream maker in the United States behind Unilever. Wells produces the Blue Bunny brand, along with Halo Top, Bomb Pop, and Blue Ribbon Classics. In addition, Wells is the licensee for Weight Watchers Ice Cream and The Cheesecake Factory at Home “ice cream” products, and produces Great Value brand “ice cream” under license for Walmart. In 2007 and 2008, Wells sold its cultured dairy and fluid milk business to Dean Foods and its yogurt business to Grupo Lala.

In 2023, it was reported that Ferrero SpA had completed the purchase of the company.

== History ==
Fred H. Wells Jr. opened a milk route in 1913 in Le Mars after purchasing a horse, delivery wagon, and a few cans and jars for $250 from local dairy farmer Ray Bowers.

Around 1925, Wells and his sons began manufacturing ice cream and selling it in neighboring Iowa towns: Remsen, Alton and Sioux City. In 1928 Fairmont Ice Cream purchased the ice cream distribution system in Sioux City along with the right to use the Wells name.

In 1935, the Wells family decided to sell ice cream in Sioux City again. Unable to sell their product under their own name "Wells", they decided to hold a “Name That Ice Cream” contest in the Sioux City Journal. A Sioux City man won the $25 cash prize for the winning entry of “Blue Bunny” after noticing how much his son enjoyed the blue bunnies in a department store window at Easter.

After Fred H. Wells Jr. died in 1954, his sons, Harold, Mike, Roy and Fay, and their cousin Fred D. Wells, son of Harry Cole Wells, ran the family business as a partnership. Meanwhile, new facilities were added in the postwar period. For example, the main part of the company, the North Plant, was built in Le Mars in the 1950s for the manufacture of ice cream products. In 1963, the company constructed its Milk Plant. The family retained ownership and management of the business after it was incorporated under Iowa law in 1977 as Wells' Dairy, Inc. Fay and Fred Wells retired in January 2001, leaving the positions of CEO, president and COO to Fay Wells' sons and the positions of executive vice president and vice president of retail sales to Fred Wells' sons.

The newly incorporated business expanded in the 1980s. New corporate offices were added in 1980, and Wells built new facilities for its growing fleet of trucks used to deliver milk around Iowa. In 1983, Wells purchased an Omaha plant and after being remodeled, it processed milk, yogurt and fruit juice.

In the mid-1980s the firm's North Plant in Le Mars was enlarged through the purchase of five adjacent lots. New production lines, a mix department, and a high-rise freezer helped the company double the North Plant's capability. After completion, the expanded plant covered the equivalent of one city block, with the first floor taking up 109,000 square feet (10,100 m^{2}) and its second floor comprising 44,000 square feet (4,100 m^{2}). When D.S Abernethy's company Merritt Foods closed down in 1991, Wells' Dairy bought the business, including Bomb Pops. The ice cream had remained largely a regional brand until 1992 when it began an aggressive program to expand nationally. The centerpiece of the expansion is a 900,000-square-foot (84,000 m^{2}) plant, which in addition to manufacturing includes a 12-story-tall freezer. The plant is referred to as the “South Ice Cream Plant” because of its physical location on the south side of Le Mars. Operating two ice cream plants in Le Mars, Wells is the world's largest manufacturer of ice cream in one location (which in turn has prompted Le Mars to claim the title of “Ice Cream Capital of the World”).

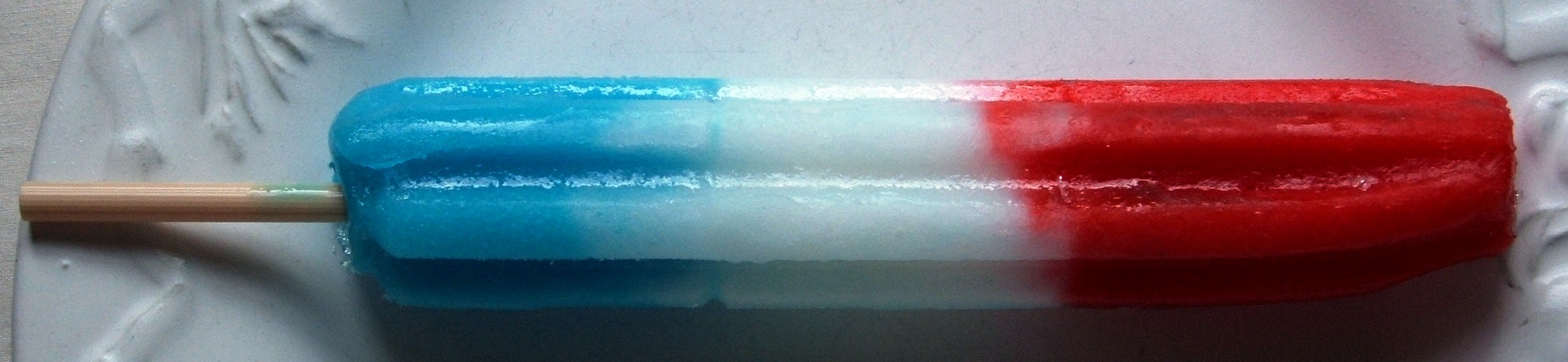
Original flavor Bomb Pop

In 2003, an ice cream plant in St. George, Utah was opened to better meet the west coast market. In 2014 Wells announced it would be closing the St. George, UT facility.

In November 2007, Mike Wells was named CEO of Wells.

On 7 December 2022, the company announced its acquisition by Ferrero Group, an Italian confectionery manufacturer.

=== Blue Bunny ===
Blue Bunny Ice Cream is a brand of novelty frozen dairy dessert products manufactured by Wells Enterprises.

The company received the "most delicious chocolate ice cream flavor award" at the 2008 International Dairy Foods Association Ice Cream Technology Conference, the same year the Blue Bunny Helmet of Hope Program in partnership with the Jimmie Johnson Foundation was announced. The partnership allows consumers across the United States to nominate educational charities to receive a $25,000 grant.

== Brands ==
=== Current ===
- Bomb Pop
- Halo Top
- Blue Bunny
- Blue Ribbon Classics

== Recalls ==
- July 2025 Voluntary United States-wide: 18,000 containers of ice cream and yogurt over concerns of plastic particle contamination.
