= Bomb Pop =

Brand of ice pops

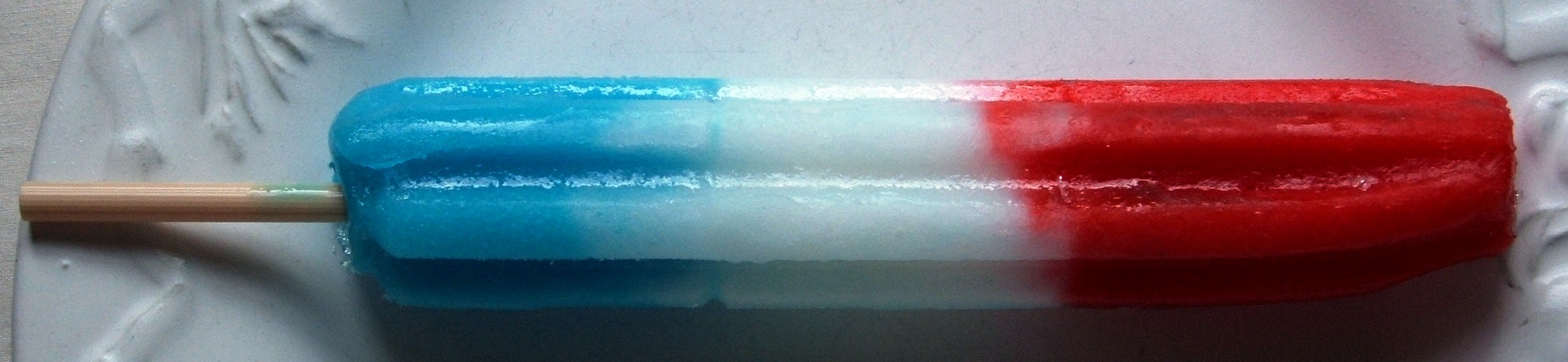
Original flavor Bomb Pop

Bomb Pop is a brand of ice pops manufactured by Wells Enterprises, who were acquired by the Ferrero Group in 2023. The original flavor contains cherry, lime, and blue raspberry flavorings. As of 2025, there are nine main Bomb Pop flavors, as well as four "Extremes" flavors. The active Bomb Pop flavors are: Original, Original Sugar Free, Banana Fudge, Watermelon, Hawaiian Punch, Nerds, Crush, Berry Burst, Candy Clash, Extremes Super Sour Cherry Limeade, Extremes Super Sour Blue Raspberry, Extremes Super Sour Strawberry, and Extremes Fire Cherry.

== History ==
Bomb Pop was invented by James S. Merritt and D.S. Abernethy in Kansas City, Missouri, on July 30, 1955. In 1971, Bomb Pop was trademarked. In 1975, Bomb Pop was patented by then President of Merritt Foods, James W. Wilkerson. When D.S. Abernethy's company, Merritt Foods, closed down in 1991, Wells' Dairy bought the business, including Bomb Pops.

In 1999, Stephen Labaton of The New York Times used bombpop.com as an example of why there needed to be new rules to protect children's privacy. Any child who wanted to win a Nintendo Game Boy had to fill out their personal information, including their address.

In 2003, The Walt Disney Company made a deal with Wells' Dairy to release Buzz Lightyear Bomb Pops.

Several competitors sell similar looking popsicles, with some litigation by a competitor in 2014, which was eventually dismissed.

Blue Bunny celebrated Bomb Pops' 50th anniversary in 2005 by starting a sweepstakes. The sweepstakes included giving a vacation to Disneyland to two winners and giving 50 winners a Game Boy Advance. The 50th anniversary was also the start of National Bomb Pop Day, which is celebrated on the last Thursday in June.

Ferrero Group completed its acquisition of Wells Enterprises in January 2023, acquiring their portfolio of brands, including Bomb Pop.

In 2026, Bomb Pop began transitioning from using artificial dyes to using natural sources such as turmeric to add color to the products.
