= Anna Sun =

Single by Walk the Moon

from the album i want! i want! and Walk the Moon
- B-side: "Anywayican"
- Released: February 7, 2012
- Recorded: 2010
- Studio: Doppler (Atlanta, Georgia); Maze (Atlanta, Georgia)
- Genre: Dance-pop; electropop; indie pop
- Length: 5:21
- Label: RCA
- Songwriters: Nicholas Petricca; Adrian Galvin; Nick Lerangis; Adam Reifsnyder
- Producer: Ben Allen

Walk the Moon singles chronology
"Anna Sun" (2012)	"Tightrope" (2012)

Music video
- "Anna Sun" on YouTube

"Anna Sun" is the debut single by American rock band Walk the Moon, released on February 7, 2012. The song is originally from their 2010 self-released debut album I want! I want! and was also included on their 2012 major-label debut album, Walk the Moon. The song was written by band members Adrian Galvin, Nick Lerangis, Nicholas Petricca and Adam Reifsnyder.

"Anna Sun" peaked at number 10 on the Billboard Alternative chart and number 20 on the Billboard Rock Songs chart.

== Song history ==
"Anna Sun" was written by lead vocalist Nicholas Petricca and New York-based singer/songwriter Nick Lerangis, along with the help of their 8-year-old neighbor Jake Young. The song is named after their professor from Kenyon College (who now teaches at Duke University) and is meant to symbolize youth.

The band's self-released album I Want! I Want! was recorded by Chris Schmidt and Ben Cochran at Soap Floats Recording Studio in their hometown of Cincinnati, Ohio.

== Composition ==
"Anna Sun"
A 31-second sample of "Anna Sun" where the chorus is played.

According to the sheet music published at Musicnotes.com by Universal Music Publishing Group, "Anna Sun" is written in the time signature of common time, with a moderate tempo of 72 beats per minute. It is composed in the key of B♭ major and the melody spans a tonal range of G_{3} to B♭_{4}.

== Reception and accolades ==
"Anna Sun" received positive reviews from critics. In their review of the Walk the Moon album, Dani Beck and Derrick Robertson called the song "sunny, easy, carefree electronic pop" and noted that it was one of the few highlights in a mostly negative album review. James Christopher Monger, writing for AllMusic, called "Anna Sun" one of the best moments on Walk the Moon and that it "hold[s] fast to the band's talent for crafting synth-heavy, fat, and percussive dancefloor gems". Dulce Rosales of recultured.com noted that while "the lyrics are somewhat repetitive, the simplicity helps hook listeners and causes them to sing along even after a single listen". Brian Benton of MVRemix.com was critical on the length of the song, saying that "it’s five and a half minutes long, when it could be just as effective in three".

"Anna Sun" was named the song of the summer in a 2011 Esquire article "30 Summer Songs Every Man Should Listen To". Additionally, the single was also named song of the summer by MTV and Seventeen, as well as one of the best songs of the year by Amazon.

In an article from Kenyon's Her Campus, Professor Sun was said to have "immediately liked it" the first time she heard it. She further gave her opinion: “The song is about Kenyon life. It has nothing to do with me, so I thought ‘sure, use my name for the chorus,’” she said.

== Chart performance ==
"Anna Sun" first appeared on Billboard's Hot Singles Sales chart at number seven on March 10, 2012. On March 24, 2012, the song debuted at number thirty-nine on the Alternative Songs chart. It reached its peak at number ten on July 21, 2012 after spending 18 weeks on the chart.

Similarly, "Anna Sun" entered the Hot Rock Songs chart at number forty-six on April 14, 2012. On August 4, 2012, the song peaked at number twenty, giving Walk the Moon their first top twenty hit on the chart. "Anna Sun" managed to obtain some success on the Bubbling Under Hot 100 Singles chart, peaking at number eighteen on September 15, 2012. The song experienced its highest peak on the Adult Alternative Songs chart, reaching number three on October 27, 2012.

Outside the United States, the song became a minor hit on the UK Singles Chart, debuting at number eighty-two on its first week. It also appeared on Belgium's Ultratip Flanders chart, where it reached number eight. On Billboard's Mexico Ingles Airplay chart, the song peaked at number forty-six.

== Music video ==
=== Production ===
"We wanted to get it out there and make a music video people could watch again and again."

— Patrick Meier discussing his goal for the "Anna Sun" music video.

The music video for "Anna Sun" was directed and produced by Patrick Meier of Contrast Productions. It was recorded in Cincinnati, Ohio and was filmed from August 31-September 1, 2010.

The video includes original choreography from Kim Popa, the executive director of the local Cincinnati based dance troupe Pones Inc. After meeting with the band, she decided that the vibe should be "the intangible feeling of being a kid...then maintaining that whimsy into adulthood." Popa said that she was inspired by ceremonial African dances as well as Michael Jackson moves from her childhood when designing the dance moves. At one point during the video, dancers can be seen wearing bodysuits and leotards, reminiscent of 80s aerobics.

According to bassist Kevin Ray, the first half of the video was shot 22 times. However, only the third take was used.

=== Synopsis ===
A screenshot from the "Anna Sun" music video

The video begins with a 2 and a half minute long take, shot inside the Mockbee building in the brewery district of Cincinnati. The camera follows lead singer Petricca as he walks through the labyrinth of rooms, encountering numerous partiers. At one point during the shot, Petricca plays the keytar. Eventually, Petricca finds a room full of dancers before engaging in a group dance. After the dance, Petricca opens a door, which leads him to a different outdoor location.

The second part of the video consists of jump cuts between Petricca singing while directly looking at the camera and more party goers, covered in face paint, preparing for battle. including a young boy, presumably a younger version of Petricca. The partiers prepare for battle, before they eventually continue partying. At the end of the video, the young boy runs back to the door that was used to transport Petricca to the new location. The boy paints the word Anna along with a drawing of a sun on the door.

Petricca noted that the tradition of wearing face paint during their live performances evolved from the video.

=== Reception ===
MTV Hive called the video a "hilariously choreographed, neon-colored and awesomely shot in one take" production.

== Usage in media ==
- "Anna Sun received numerous remixes, two of which were by Fool's Gold and by Trouble Productions.
- The TV show Vampire Diaries used "Anna Sun" in the first episode of season three.
- Clothing retailer American Eagle Outfitters added "Anna Sun" to their video rotation in May 2011.
- The song has been covered by Australian indie rock band The Griswolds, YouTube personality Joey Graceffa, as well as being performed in a duet with independent rapper Hoodie Allen and guitarist Kina Grannis.

== Track listing and formats ==
CD/digital download – Extended play (EP)
No.	Title	Length
1.	"Tightrope"	3:30
2.	"Anna Sun"	5:21
3.	"Next in Line"	3:59

7-inch vinyl
No.	Title	Length
1.	"Anna Sun"	5:21
2.	"Anywayican"	3:43

Digital download
No.	Title	Length
1.	"Anna Sun"	5:21

Austria, Germany and Switzerland digital download
No.	Title	Length
1.	"Anna Sun"	5:21
2.	"Anna Sun" (Radio Edit)	3:38

Austria, Germany and Switzerland digital EP – Remixes
No.	Title	Length
1.	"Anna Sun"	5:21
2.	"Anna Sun" (Radio Edit)	3:38
3.	"Anna Sun" (Fool's Gold Remix)	2:59
4.	"Anna Sun" (Instrumental Version)	5:21
5.	"Anna Sun" (Video)	5:24

UK and Ireland digital download
No.	Title	Length
1.	"Anna Sun"	5:21
2.	"Anna Sun" (Fool's Gold Remix)	2:58

Digital EP
No.	Title	Length
1.	"Anna Sun"	5:21
2.	"Anna Sun" (Radio Edit)	3:38
3.	"Anna Sun" (Fool's Gold Remix)	2:59
4.	"Anna Sun" (Instrumental Version)	5:21

== Credits and personnel ==
Credits adapted from the liner notes of Walk the Moon.

Locations

- Recorded at Doppler Studios and Maze Studios, Atlanta, Georgia
- Mixed at The Ballroom Studio, Los Angeles, California
- Mastered at Marcussen Mastering, Hollywood, California

Personnel

- Nick Petricca – vocals, keyboards, percussion, songwriting
- Kevin Ray – bass, vocals, songwriting
- Sean Waugaman – percussion, vocals, ray-gun, songwriting
- Eli Maiman – guitar, vocals, songwriting
- Chris Robinson – songwriting
- Adrian Galvin – songwriting
- Nick Lerangis – songwriting
- Adam Reifsnyder – songwriting
- Ben Allen – production
- TJ Elias – assistant engineer
- Will Thrift – assistant engineer
- Mark Needham – mixing
- Will Brierre – mixing assistant
- Stephen Marcussen – mastering

== Charts and certifications ==
=== Weekly charts ===
Chart (2012)	Peak position
Belgium (Ultratip Bubbling Under Flanders)	8
Mexico Ingles Airplay (Billboard)	46
Scotland Singles (Official Charts)	79
UK Singles (Official Charts)	82
US Bubbling Under Hot 100 (Billboard)	18
US Adult Pop Airplay (Billboard)	36
US Hot Rock & Alternative Songs (Billboard)	20
US Hot Singles Sales (Billboard)	7
US Rock & Alternative Airplay (Billboard)	20

=== Year-end charts ===
Chart (2012)	Position
US Adult Alternative Songs (Billboard)	32
US Alternative Airplay (Billboard)	31
US Hot Rock & Alternative Songs (Billboard)	67

=== Certifications ===
Region	Certification	Certified units/sales
United States (RIAA)	2× Platinum	2,000,000^{‡}
^{‡} Sales+streaming figures based on certification alone.

== Release history ==
Release dates and formats for "Anna Sun"
Region	Date	Format	Label(s)	Ref.
United States	August 14, 2012	Mainstream airplay	RCA	
