= The Sex Was Good Until It Wasn't =

Studio album by Xana
- Released: May 10, 2024
- Genres: pop; pop-rock
- Length: 58:26
- Label: Nettwerk Music Group
- Director: Lindsey Blane
- Producers: Liam Moes; Xana Morris; Shane Stephenson

Xana chronology
Tantrums (2022)	The Sex Was Good Until It Wasn't (2024)

Singles from The Sex Was Good Until It Wasn't
- 1. "Better Kind Of Best Friend"; 2. "Homewrecking Era"; 3. "Monster"

The Sex Was Good Until It Wasn't is the second album by Canadian singer-songwriter Xana, released in 2024. The album marks the Vancouver-based singer's second project after her debut album Tantrums released in 2022. For the album, Xana returned to producers Liam Moes and Shane Stephenson, who both worked on her first album. A deluxe version of the album was released in February 2025.

== Background ==
Fresh off of touring for her debut album Tantrums, Xana would begin putting together her second album, one that she had been planning since before she released Tantrums.

In February 2024, Xana teased her upcoming project by posting a photo to her socials along with a redacted list of 15 tracks. Days later she released the first single, "Better Kind Of Best Friend" along with an accompanying music video, directed by Lindsey Blane, as well as the release date for her upcoming album. In March she followed up with "Homewrecking Era". In April, Xana released "Monster" as the third single from the upcoming album.

On May 10, Xana released the album The Sex Was Good Until It Wasn't on all platforms.

=== Deluxe edition ===
The Deluxe Edition was released on February 7, 2025, with five additional songs (Note: 4 new tracks and a variation on the song "15") on it. This included a new single "crying after sex".

== Themes and composition ==
For the creation of her newest album, Xana returned to producers, Liam Moes and Shane Stephenson, who Xana built trust with on her first album.

Xana explains that the second track "the sex was good" lent its name to the title of the album, The Sex Was Good Until It Wasn't, as it encapsulates all the themes in discussed throughout the album such as, trauma, sex and her relationships with friends and family.

The song "Better Kind Of Best Friend" is a pop-rock anthem celebrating queer empowerment and bodily autonomy. In the song "Homewrecking Era" Xana utilizes guitar riffs and drums paired with flirtatious vocals to portray a villainous perspective of an illicit affair in the song. Xana created "Monster" as a direct follow up to "Homewrecking Era" and describes it as a reflection of all the actions she regrets".

Xana also explains that she had always intended that the opening track on the album would be "Lip Service" and the closing track be "January".

For the deluxe edition, Xana revisits the song "15" from the standard release of the album by including an acoustic variant titled "fifteen". She explains that she wanted "fifteen" to be a softer more vulnerable version of the song than the raw emotions depicted in "15". For the track "Confidential" off the deluxe edition, Xana explains that she wrote a song as if she was writing the theme song for James Bond, she also added Jazz elements such as a Saxophone solo in the song. Overall, she describes the deluxe songs as a progression of the original version.

== Track listing ==
All lyrics are written by Xana Morris; all music is composed by Liam Moes, Xana Morris, Shane Stephenson.

Standard Edition
No.	Title	Producer	Length
1.	"Lip Service"	Moes; Morris; Stephenson	4:46
2.	"the sex was good"	Moes; Morris; Stephenson	2:51
3.	"Better Kind Of Best Friend"	Moes; Morris; Stephenson	3:39
4.	"Homewrecking Era"	Moes; Morris; Stephenson	3:22
5.	"Monster"	Moes; Morris; Stephenson	4:27
6.	"Sick Joke"	Moes; Morris; Stephenson	4:31
7.	"15"	Moes; Morris; Stephenson	4:47
8.	"Lavander Daughter"	Moes; Morris; Stephenson	3:48
9.	"FERAL"	Moes; Morris; Stephenson	3:32
10.	"BODY"	Moes; Morris; Stephenson	3:18
11.	"The Kicker"	Moes; Morris; Stephenson	4:06
12.	"earth eyes"	Moes; Morris; Stephenson	1:35
13.	"Alibi"	Moes; Morris; Stephenson	3:25
14.	"4ever"	Moes; Morris; Stephenson	4:05
15.	"January"	Moes; Morris; Stephenson	6:08
Total length:			58:26

Deluxe Edition (Note: The Deluxe Edition contains all the tracks on the standard edition)
No.	Title	Writer(s)	Producer	Length
16.	"crying after sex"	Moes; Morris; Stephenson	Moes; Morris; Stephenson	2:45
17.	"Confidential"	Moes; Morris; Stephenson	Moes; Morris; Stephenson	4:31
18.	"fifteen"	Moes; Morris; Stephenson	Moes; Morris; Stephenson	4:29
19.	"Cocaine"	Moes; Morris; Stephenson	Moes; Morris; Stephenson	4:09
20.	"Save The Bullets, Baby!"	Moes; Morris; Stephenson	Moes; Morris; Stephenson	3:57
Total length:				1:18:00

Credits from Spotify.
