= Xana (musician) =

Canadian pop musician

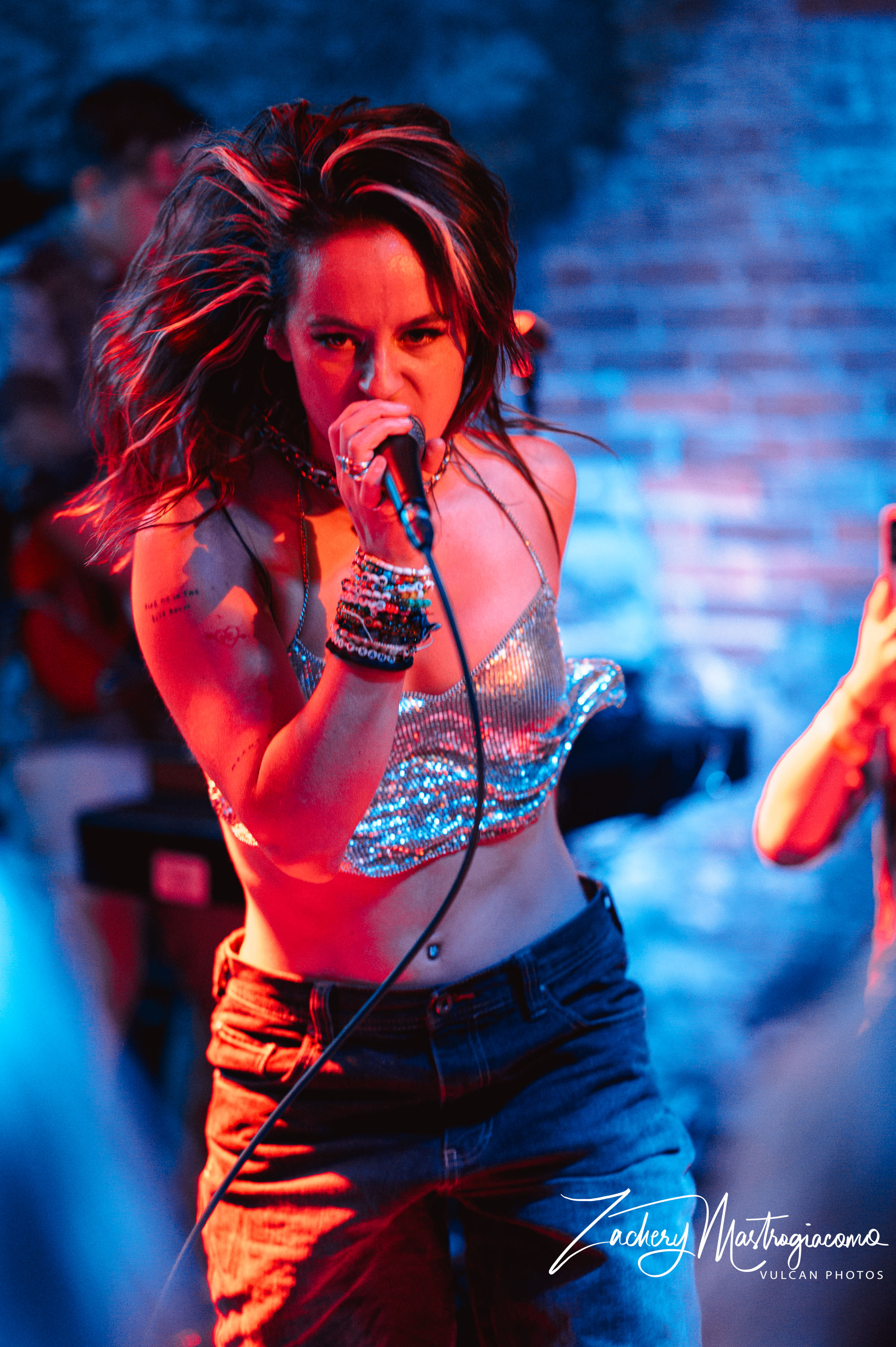
- Xana in 2023

Background information
- Born: Xana Morris; Victoria, British Columbia, Canada
- Origin: Vancouver, Canada
- Genres: pop; Pop rock
- Instrument: Vocals
- Years active: 2020–present
- Website: xanaofficial.com

Xana Morris (/ˈɛksˌænə/ eks-a-nə), known professionally as Xana , is a Canadian pop musician based in Vancouver. She is known for making music around the themes of queerness and identity. She released her debut album Tantrums in 2022, followed by her second album The Sex Was Good Until It Wasn't in 2024.

== Early life ==
Xana was born in Victoria, British Columbia, and grew up in a music-loving family on Vancouver Island. At age 5, Xana took violin lessons, and at 10, she took vocal lessons.

== Career ==
=== 2015 - 2019: Career beginnings ===
In 2015, Xana formed an acoustic pop-punk duo, Coffee Eyes, with Joel Cossette. When the duo broke up, Xana took at two-year educational program, during which time she avoided writing. In 2018, two months after her program ended, she went to work in order to later make music a financially viable career. She wrote what was to be her third solo single, "Tipsy", during the gap between school and work. She continued to write music for the next two years, although she would only begin recording in 2020.

=== 2020 - 2021: Early solo career ===
Xana released her debut single "Goddess" in 2020. The song serves as a statement as to who she is as an artist and the space she'll take up in the industry. Asked why the song uses male pronouns, despite Xana identifying as a lesbian, Xana explained that "the song speaks to many different situations, personal or otherwise. It was a fuck-you to those people who think they can walk all over you and take whatever they want. With everything that I was dealing with personally and seeing around me in the music industry, the use of “he” pronouns reflected those experiences." Due to the COVID-19 pandemic, which struck right before her planned debut, Xana primarily promoted her music through TikTok.

Xana subsequently released singles "Pray", "Tipsy", "Yellow", and "Kitchen Light".

Xana worked with the indie band Cold Fame on their debut single “tuesday.” which was released on November 23, 2021.

=== 2022-2023: Tantrums ===
Xana released her debut album, Tantrums, on April 15, 2022. The album is autobiographical, reflecting on Xana's experiences in a toxic relationship. The title reflects how, through her music, Xana is "throwing tantrums so other people don't have to". There has been positive reception to the album, with Xtra Magazine citing the opening track as one of "the best queer songs of April" and "the perfect song to throw up two middle fingers to after the end of a relationship gone awry".

The songs "Yellow", "Kitchen Light", and "19" from Tantrums, as well as the single "Tipsy", have music videos featuring the character Jodie, who is inspired by a woman with whom Xana had a relationship, and who was important to Xana's personal "life and "journey". Excluding "Tipsy", all the videos star Maia Cervellin as Jodie; the actor was changed after "Tipsy" due to the on-screen chemistry with Maia. The music video for "Kitchen Light" gained over one million views on YouTube.

In November 2022, Xana released an acoustic single, "bet you'll get off on this." The song was written over two days and recorded over three days. In 2023, she released single "Bad Bandit," a Western-themed track with "splashes of country twang," and "babyblue," which reflects Xana's experience with lost childhood friendships.

Xana works frequently with producers and engineers Liam Moes and Shane Stephenson who both were a part of her debut album.

=== 2024 - present: The Sex Was Good Until It Wasn't ===
In 2024, Xana began releasing the first three singles from her upcoming album. In February she released "Better Kind Of Best Friend". In March she released "Homewrecking Era". In April she released "Monster." On May 10, 2024, Xana released her second album, The Sex Was Good Until it Wasn't. She went on tour in the United States that summer to support the album.

Following The Sex Was Good Tour, Xana announced the Until It Wasn't Tour in April 2025. The tour includes a North American leg beginning in October 2025, supported by Siena Liggins, and a second leg in the United Kingdom in early 2026, supported by VANÈS. Strong demand during UK pre-sales resulted in venue changes to larger locations, including CHALK in Brighton, Strange Brew in Bristol, and Village Underground in London.

== Artistry ==
=== Influences ===
Xana has cited Avril Lavigne as her "first musical love" and inspiration at 6 years old, saying that "anti-pop very much formed the bones of my current sound. It allows the artist to branch out and can take so many different forms. I think that’s what makes it feel so authentic to the creator. I can experiment, try out different genres, themes and still sustain that anti-pop feel." She was inspired by Taylor Swift to write her own songs and describes her and Halsey as among her biggest idols.

=== Themes ===
Xana's music primarily revolves around themes of queer romance, as well as female empowerment and sexuality. She has stated that she “grew up with very little representation, and when I was trying to figure out who I am and what I’m all about, that was the most important and helpful thing for me was just ... immersing myself in all this media and all this music and all this culture and so that’s what I’m trying to do for other people.”

Xana's music also tends to stem from personal experiences and struggles, explaining:

“I’m going to write everything that I want to say and that I want to get out, and if it works, then it works, and if it doesn’t, it doesn’t, but it doesn’t matter because I need to say all of this stuff and I need to make the music that I want to hear more of.”

She has expressed the same sentiment in a later interview with Atwood Magazine, following her single "babyblue":

"I finally found a place to put those feelings and anxieties, and that’s usually how writing music feels for me. I find a place to put it down, I can visit it and feel it when I need to, but I don’t always have to carry it when I don’t need to. And performing it live is a whole other kind of therapy. I feel like my entire body is bursting at the seams while I sing this song. That feeling is where the heavy healing kicks in. I probably turn to songwriting as therapy more than actual therapy, which I’m sure will catch up for me one day but so far so good baby!"

== Personal life ==
Xana openly identifies as both queer and lesbian.

== Social media ==
As of August 24, 2025, Xana has over 350,000 listeners on Spotify. Her most popular song, “Goddess,” has over 18 million streams. She has just over 50,000 subscribers on YouTube and a total of seven music videos. The most popular, “Kitchen Light,” has over 2.6 million views. She also has over 91,000 followers on TikTok with a cumulative 1.9 million likes.

== Discography ==
=== Albums ===
Title	Details
Tantrums	Released: April 15, 2022; Formats: streaming
The Sex Was Good Until It Wasn't	Released: May 10, 2024; Formats: streaming

=== Singles ===
Title	Year	Album
"Goddess"	2020	Non Album Single
"Pray"	2020	Non Album Single
"Tipsy"	2021	Non Album Single
"Yellow"	2021	Tantrums
"Kitchen Light"	2021	Tantrums
"My Therapist Told Me"	2022	Tantrums
"bet you'll get off on this"	2022	Non Album Single
"Bad Bandit"	2023	Non Album Single
"babyblue"	2023	Non Album Single
"Better Kind of Best Friend"	2024	The Sex Was Good Until It Wasn't
"Homewrecking Era"	2024	The Sex Was Good Until It Wasn't
"Monster"	2024	The Sex Was Good Until It Wasn't
"crying after sex"	2025	The Sex Was Good Until It Wasn't
"GIRLSGIRL"	2025	Non Album Single
"711"	2026	Where Else Would I Go? (Note: unreleased album)
"Horror Story of the Week"	2026	Where Else Would I Go?
