= IRAWniQ =

American rapper, singer, songwriter and producer

- Born: Carissa Chavval Anderson; March 2, 1986 (age 40); Grand Rapids, Michigan, U.S.
- Genres: Hip hop; Alternative Hip Hop; Rap Rock
- Occupations: Rapper; Singer; Record Producer; songwriter
- Years active: 2009-Present
- Label: Unsigned
- Website: irawniq.com

Carissa Chavval Anderson (born March 2, 1986), known as iRAWniQ (pronounced "ironic"), also known as RAW, is a gender-fluid American rapper, singer, songwriter and producer.

Born in Grand Rapids, Michigan, she started as part of the electro-hiphop duo, Flying Without Wingz, in 2010, releasing five EPS while signing two distribution deals with Shake Your Ass Records as well as Dandy Kid Records. After going solo in 2012, iRAWniQ released her mixtape as Lisa Turtle which featured Grand Hustle production credit from 2BandGeeks and a feature from newly signed Aftermath rapper, Jon Connor. In 2014, iRAWniQ released her EP, No One Said It Would Be Easy, accompanied with three remixes and a visual directed by JB Ghuman Jr. Her latest EP, Black Girls On Skateboards, was released in 2016, selling over 10,000 copies independently via her bandcamp. This project also gave her acclaim in the LGBTQ community, securing her an official SXSW showcase in March. The EP's lead visual, Alien Pu$, also directed by JB Ghuman Jr, featured Tatum O'Neal. The animation was curated by former Disney Animator, Dave Woodman. The visual took over eight months to finish from start to finish and received acclaim from Huffington Post, Vice, and LA Weekly.

== Early life ==
iRAWniQ was born and raised in Grand Rapids, Michigan. She was born to a Mexican mother and an African American father. Her biological parents were both addicted to drugs and additionally ran a prostitution business at the time of her birth. She was adopted in 1989 by two pastors in Grand Rapids, Michigan.

== Career ==
=== 2009-2012: Career beginnings ===
RAW began her career as part of the duo Flying Without Wingz. The duo included rapper and songwriter, Vernon 'VC' Carter. The duo was awarded, NEXT TO BLOW, and released 5 EPs in their short-lived career. Their first mixtape, The X-Files, was self-released on their Myspace page in 2009. Their second mixtape, HipTRONica, was released in 2010 and their song "All Stars" debuted on clear channel radio in Grand Rapids, Michigan. In 2011, they linked with producer Slade Templeton releasing their EP, Welcome To The Playground, whose single 'Playdate' scored top ten in the dubstep genre on Beatport. The duo would go on to create 3 more EPs, while working with local producers such as Sango, The SevenTH, Eclectic and Cool Beanz and No Soul Robot. After relocating to Los Angeles in 2012, the duo decided to go their separate ways to creatively find themselves.

=== 2012-2016 ===
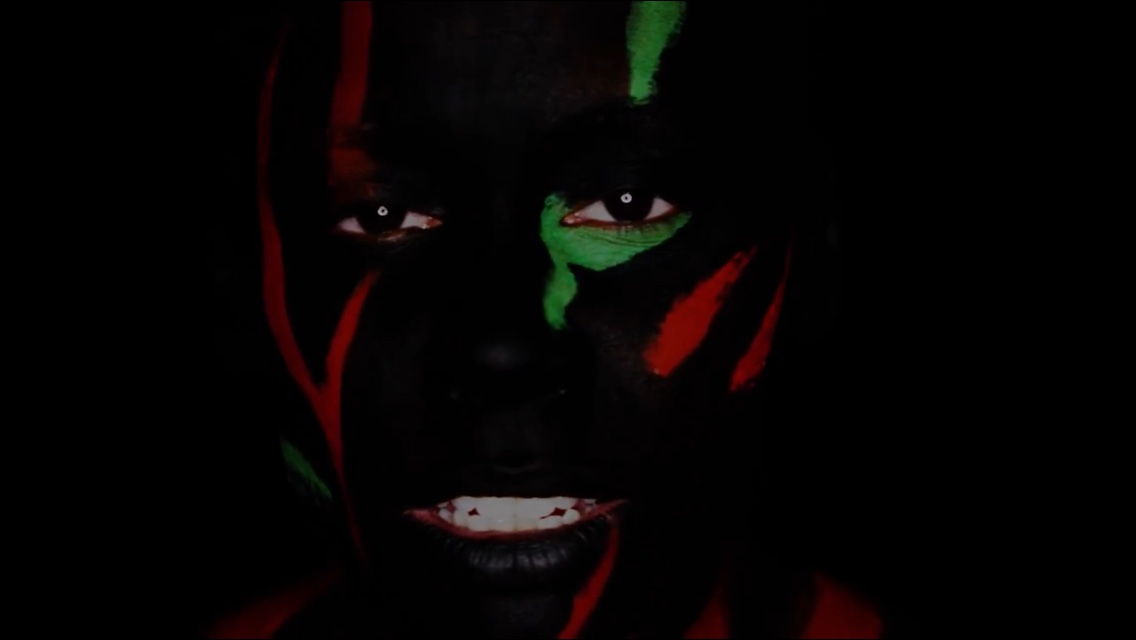
iRAWniQ in Singularity of the Soul 2016

Despite her band dismantling, RAW continued to find herself musically. She self-released her mixtape, iRAWniQ as Lisa Turtle in early 2012. The producers of HBO's, Girls, LENNY LETTER, praise iRAWniQ for her Lisa Turtle Comparison stating, "iRAWniQ has an incomparable sound, composed of sick backbeats and seriously life-affirming lyrics." In 2014 she released her EP, "No One Said It Would Be Easy", a record about surpassing the tribulations of being an indie, gay, single-mother in the music industry. In 2016, iRAWniQ released her EP, Black Girls On Skateboards which garnished over $10,000 in record sales on her bandcamp. She worked with Michigan-native producer & friend, No Soul Robot, for over a years time with this project. She collaborated again, with Ghuman, releasing an illustrious, next-level visual, Alien Pu$. Alien Pu$ features Tatum Oneal and was premiered with a 3-day VICE rollout. The visual was liked on Pharrell's IAMOTHER YouTube channel and praised by LA Weekly.

In late 2016, RAW was featured in JB Ghuman Jr's art installation, Singularity of the Soul. The installation features sound bytes and inserts from movies and cartoons, as well as a cameo from half of 90's duo L'Trimm, Lady Tigra. The installation centers around finding one's truth by assembling instructions in the dimensions around you.

== Personal life ==
Raw is non-binary, and uses she/they pronouns.

== Discography ==
=== EPs ===
Title	Year	Details	Track listing
No One Said It Would Be Easy [Remixes]	2019	5 songs; Release date: March 19; Length: 20 minutes	"No One Said It Would Be Easy"; "No One Said It Would Be Easy" (Josh Peace Remix); "No One Said It Would Be Easy" (NoSoulRobot Remix); "No One Said It Would Be Easy" (Acapella 1); "No One Said It Would Be Easy" (Acapella 2)
In the Mean Time	2018	4 songs; Release date: July 26; Length: 16 minutes	"Intro"; "C**t"; "Freakdat"; "Anxiety"

=== Singles ===
Title	Year	Details
"Forever" ft. Nosoulrobot	2020	Release date: March 2; Label: Charlie Girl Records
Lolabae	2019	Release date: February 1
