= Walk the Moon =

American pop/rock band

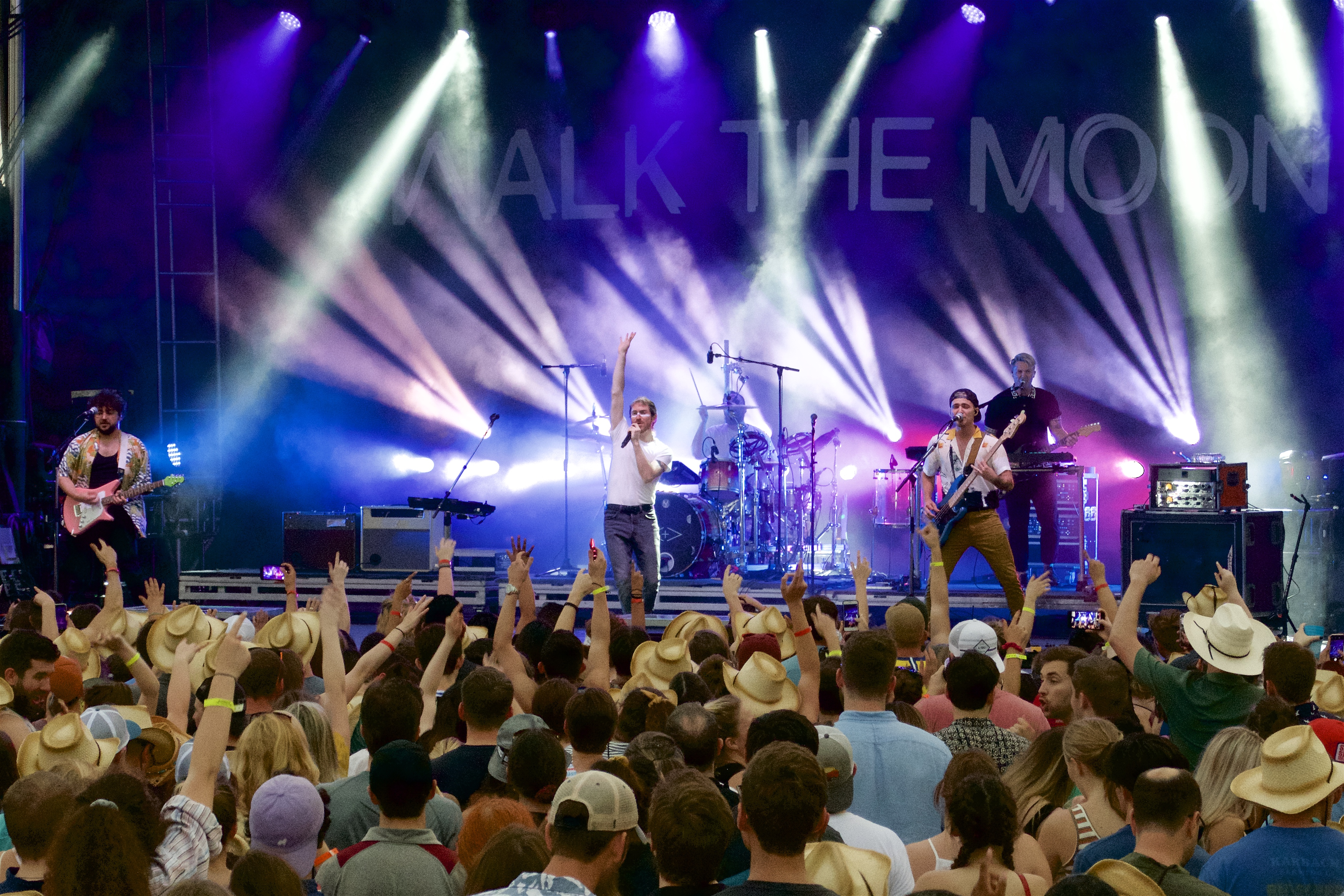
- Walk the Moon at the 2019 Love Street Music Fest in Houston

Background information
- Origin: Cincinnati, Ohio, U.S.
- Genres: Pop rock; synth-rock; new wave
- Years active: 2006–present (on hiatus)
- Label: RCA
- Members: Nicholas Petricca; Sean Waugaman; Eli Maiman
- Past members: Adam Reifsnyder; Sam Cole; Ricky Human; Nick Lerangis; Kevin Ray; Chris Robinson; Adrian Galvin
- Website: walkthemoonband.com

Walk the Moon (stylized in all-caps) is an American rock band based in Cincinnati, Ohio. Lead singer Nicholas Petricca started the band in 2006, while a student at Kenyon College, deriving the band's name from the song "Walking on the Moon" by The Police. Although the band is best known for their most successful hit single "Shut Up and Dance", other notable songs include "Anna Sun" and "One Foot".

Walk the Moon cited Talking Heads as influences. The band's use of 1980s musical mainstays, such as keyboard and synthesizer, was also notable.

== History ==
=== 2010–2011: Beginning, Anna Sun and i Want! i Want! ===
The group independently released their debut studio album, I Want! I Want!, in November 2010, receiving airplay for the track "Anna Sun" on multiple alternative radio stations. Along with the success of "Anna Sun", Alt Nation named them a band you need to know for the summer of 2012. Influential music blog Neon Gold helped to break the band in January 2011, calling "Anna Sun" "the kind of stuff British A&R dreams, and major label bidding wars, are made of." In February 2011, Walk the Moon signed to RCA Records.

In 2011, the band members began to paint their faces for live performances and they would bring enough paint to share with audience members. They have claimed it has become a “live tradition”. Bonnaroo’s camera crew documented the painting process in a short video from the 2011 festival. The band played at the Sasquatch Music Festival and Firefly Music Festival. In these years, they were known for their energetic performances and tireless touring schedule. Before the release of their self-titled album, Walk the Moon joined many other performers at the Music Midtown festival and performed on the Great Southeast Music Hall Stage in Atlanta, Georgia in September 2011. In spring 2011, the band went on a short tour with the west coast band Grouplove, as well as supporting Panic! at the Disco and Weezer on select dates. The band played on the main stage at the 20th Anniversary of Lollapalooza and also supported Local Natives in an Official Lollaplooza Aftershow at Lincoln Hall.

The band recorded i Want! i Want! with Chris Schmidt and Ben Cochran at Soap Floats Recording Studio in their hometown of Cincinnati, Ohio and then self-released it. The lead single from the album, "Anna Sun", became a surprise hit in the summer of 2011 following an endorsement by the Esquire article "30 Summer Songs Every Man Should Listen To". The song was written by Petricca and New York songwriter Nick Lerangis as their time at Kenyon College came to an end. "It's about college, about maintaining that little bit of being a kid," Petricca said. "Don't be afraid to play." The song was named after one of their favorite teachers. It was named song of the summer by MTV and Seventeen Mag, and one of the top songs of the year by Amazon. It has been officially remixed by Fool's Gold and received a Trouble Productions remix by Albert Hammond Jr. Anna Sun rose to the number one spot on Alt. Nation on Sirius XM Radio. "Anna Sun" was added to the video rotation of American Eagle Outfitters stores in May 2011. It was featured on the hit TV show Vampire Diaries in the first episode of season three. It was also the free single of the week on iTunes for the week of May 15.

Filmed in 2011 in Cincinnati's Over-the-Rhine neighborhood, the "Anna Sun" music video was released to coincide with the album. The video was shot on-location at the Cincinnati Mockbee building, as well as at a city park. It was directed and produced by Patrick Meier of the Cincinnati company Contrast Productions, and features original choreography from Kim Popa of PONES Inc., as well as a cast full of the band's friends and locals from Cincinnati. MTV Hive calls the video a "hilariously choreographed, neon-colored and awesomely shot in one take" production.

=== 2012–2013: Walk the Moon and Tightrope EP ===
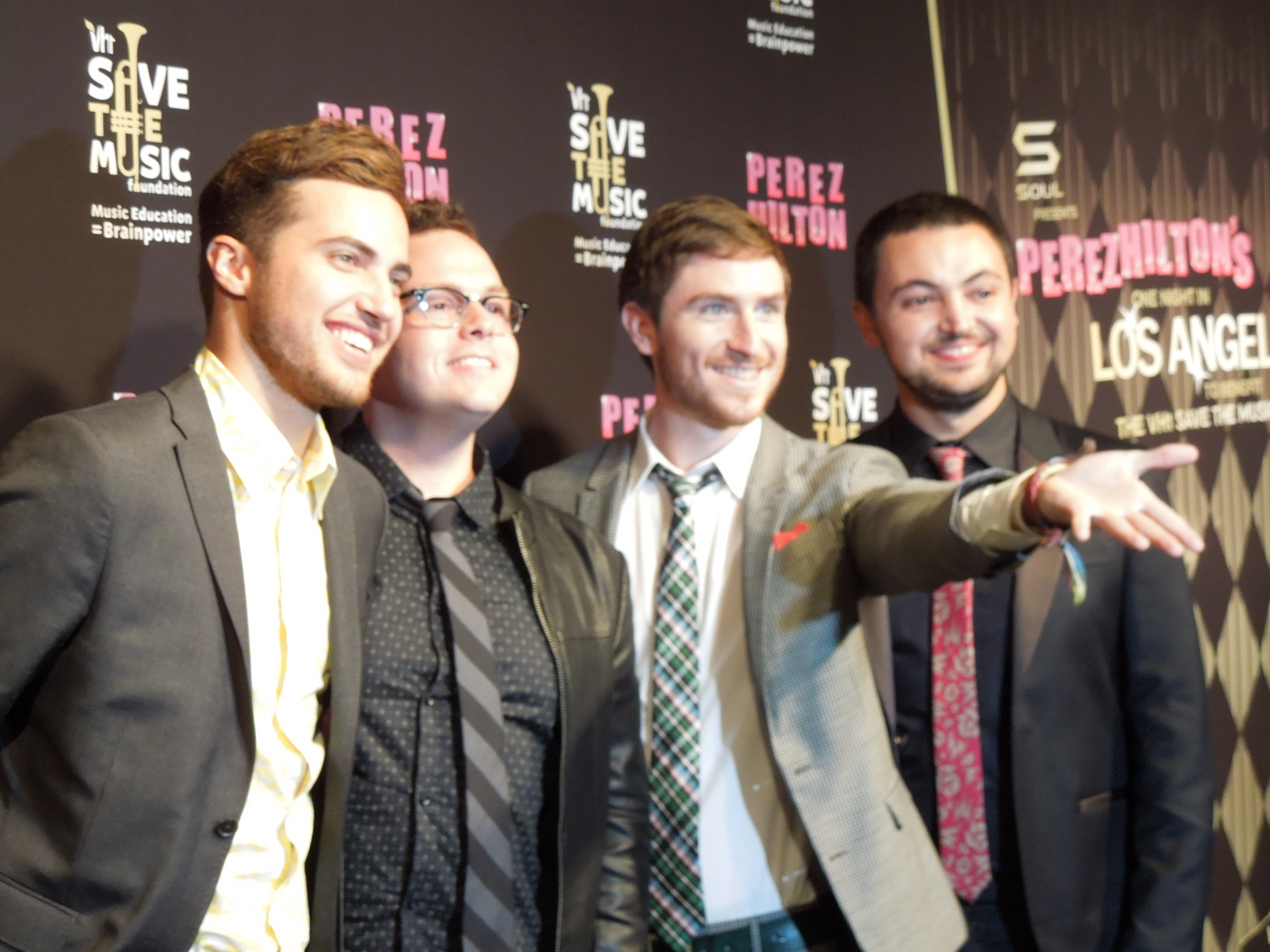
Walk the Moon in 2012. Left to right: Kevin Ray, Sean Waugaman, Nicholas Petricca, Eli Maiman.

The band's self-titled major label debut Walk the Moon was released by RCA Records on June 19, 2012. The album included a re-recorded version of "Anna Sun." The band appeared on the Late Show with David Letterman the day the album released.

On June 27, 2012, the band joined many other performers at Summerfest Music Festival and performed on the U.S. Cellular Connection Stage. The first single was "Anna Sun" which peaked at number 10 on the Billboard Alternative chart and number 20 on the Billboard Rock Songs chart. Also in 2012, Walk the Moon played in the iTunes Festival in London, appeared in KROQ's Weenie Roast 2012, and was the supporting act for Fun on their European tour. Their song “Quesadilla” was added to the official FIFA 13 soundtrack and their second single, “Tightrope” was used in a commercial for the HP Envy 4 Ultrabook laptop. and was featured in the game Saints Row IV. Petricca appeared on the song "Finale" by Madeon, which was included on the FIFA 13 soundtrack. In July and August 2014 before the release of Talking Is Hard, Walk the Moon was the opener of Panic! at the Disco on the This Is Gospel Tour.

On January 22, 2013 they released the Tightrope EP, which is made up of Tightrope, three new songs, and a cover of "Burning Down the House".

=== 2014–2016: Breakout with Talking Is Hard ===
On September 10, 2014, Walk the Moon released the single "Shut Up and Dance" (stylized as "SHUT UP + DANCE") in advance of their new album. It was written by the band members and songwriters Ben Berger and Ryan McMahon. The song is based on an experience frontman Nicholas Petricca had at a Los Angeles nightclub. His girlfriend invited him to dance, inspiring the title, which he envisioned as an anthem for letting go of frustration and having fun. The song reached number four on the Billboard Hot 100 and became a number-one hit on the magazine's Alternative Songs chart and the Hot Adult Contemporary chart. Ryan Seed of Billboard gave "Shut Up and Dance" four and a half stars out of five. Outside the United States, the song topped the charts in Poland, peaked within the top ten of the charts in Australia, Canada, Germany, Israel, the Republic of Ireland, and the United Kingdom, the top twenty of the charts in New Zealand and Sweden, and the top thirty of the charts in the Netherlands. The band has performed "Shut Up and Dance" on The Tonight Show Starring Jimmy Fallon, Late Night with Seth Meyers, Jimmy Kimmel Live!, The Ellen DeGeneres Show, and Good Morning America. In December 2014, the band released their second major-label studio album, Talking Is Hard.

During October 2014, Walk the Moon released a series of pictures and videos on their Facebook page that hinted at the album's title. The title was officially revealed to be Talking Is Hard on October 29, 2014, with a release date set for December 2. On November 10, 2014, the band released the cover artwork and song listing for Talking is Hard. On November 17, 2014, they released "Different Colors" as the second single off the album. On November 24, 2014, the album was surprise released on Spotify a week before its set release date. On December 2, 2014, the album was released in digital, CD, and vinyl formats. The album also charted at number 26 on the Billboard 200 in its first week of release.

In July 2015, Walk the Moon performed "Shut Up and Dance" in front of a hometown crowd at Cincinnati's Great American Ball Park, prior to the start of the Home Run Derby. On July 24, 2015, they joined Taylor Swift on stage at Gillette Stadium in Foxborough, Massachusetts, during her 1989 tour to perform "Shut Up and Dance". On November 16, 2015, the group sang the national anthem preceding a Monday Night Football game between the Cincinnati Bengals and the Houston Texans, which was played at Paul Brown Stadium in Cincinnati.

Walk the Moon performed "Shut Up and Dance" live at the 43rd Annual American Music Awards (AMA) on November 22, 2015. They were first-time AMA nominees for:

- New Artist of the Year
- Favorite Pop/Rock Band/Duo/Group
- Favorite Artist – Alternative Rock

The band's competition for New Artist of the Year included: Sam Hunt (winner), Fetty Wap, Tove Lo, and The Weeknd. For Favorite Pop/Rock Band, the competition was One Direction (winner) and Maroon 5. The other finalists for the Favorite Alternative Rock award were Fall Out Boy (winner) and Hozier.

On January 1, 2016, Walk the Moon performed "Shut Up and Dance" and "Work This Body" on Dick Clark's New Year's Rockin' Eve in New York. The band is also featured on the Knocks' song titled "Best For Last", which was released on their debut album entitled 55. The album was released on March 4, 2016, under the label Big Beat Records.

In April 2016, Walk the Moon announced their "Work This Body" tour would be canceled due to an illness in Petricca's family. The tour resumed in May of that year. The same month, their previously recorded collaboration with Steve Aoki and Boehm, "Back 2 U", was released as a single. In June, their rendition of the "Ghostbusters" theme song was included on the soundtrack for the 2016 film.

=== 2017–2019: What If Nothing ===
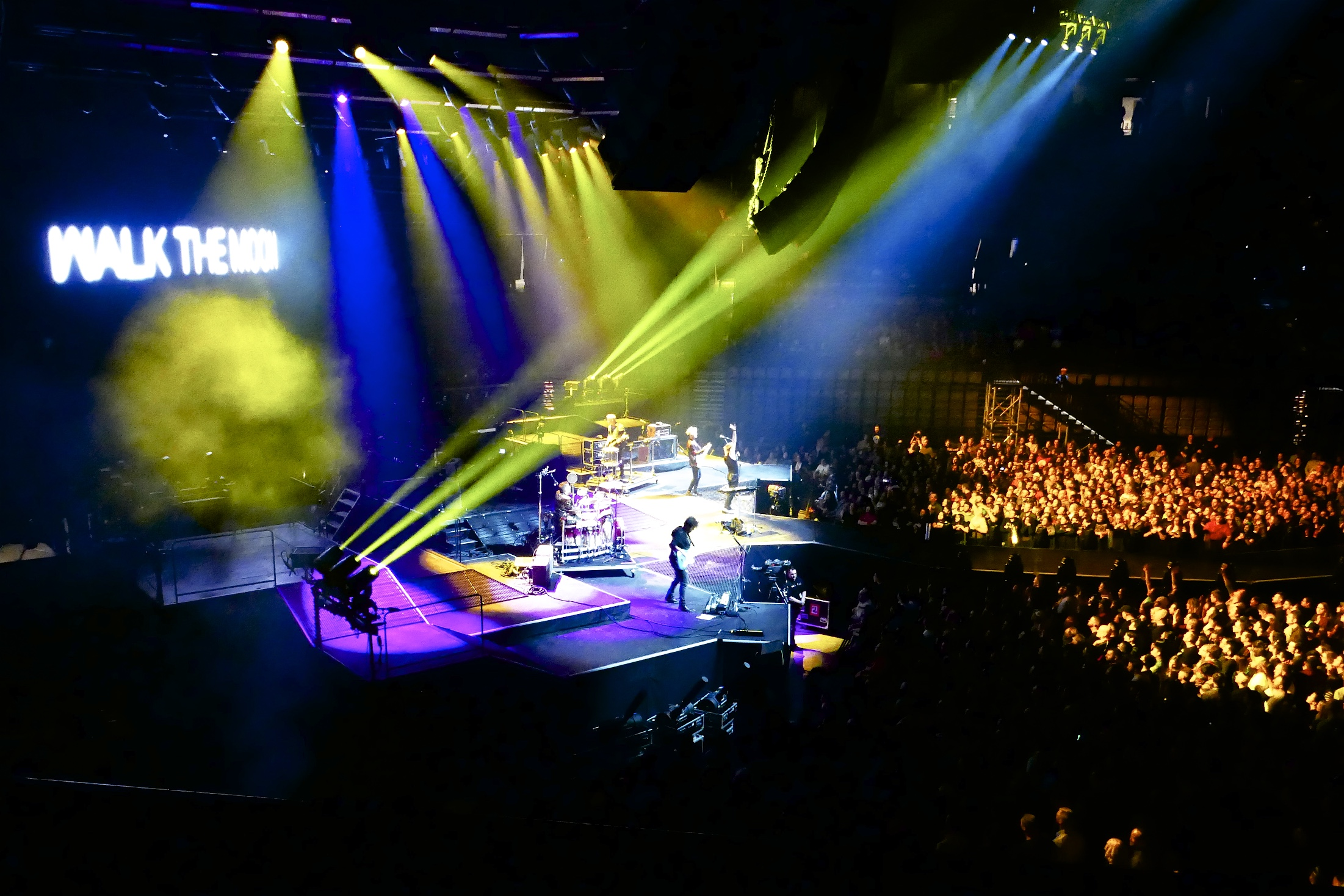
Walk the Moon opening for Muse in Las Vegas, March 2019

In August 2017, Petricca performed solo at LoveLoud fest, a music festival benefitting LGBTQ+ youth in Utah. The next month, the group released the single "One Foot" from their upcoming third album, along with an accompanying music video. On September 26, 2017, Walk the Moon announced their third studio album What If Nothing. On October 13, 2017, the band released their second single from the album, "Headphones". On October 27, 2017, Walk the Moon released their third single from the album, "Surrender".

What If Nothing was released on November 10, 2017. The album peaked at number 40on the Billboard 200, while its lead single "One Foot" peaked at #1 on the Billboard Alternative Songs chart. In November the band also kicked off its Press Restart Tour with supporting act Company of Thieves. The tour began November 19 in Charlotte, North Carolina, and ended on April 14, 2018, in Glasgow, Scotland. What If Nothing debuted at #6 on the U.S. iTunes charts. The fourth single from the album, "Kamikaze", was released on April 17, 2018. The fifth single, "Tiger Teeth", was released on October 24, 2018.

In 2018, the band was featured on the song "Home" by American alt-pop artist morgxn.

On January 14, 2019, the band was announced by Muse as their opening act during their Simulation Theory North American tour.

=== 2019–present: Heights, hiatus, and The Liftaway ===
Throughout 2019, band released stand-alone singles "Timebomb", "Eat Your Heart Out", and "Lose You Again" featuring Braves.

On July 20, 2019, the band performed at Houston's Lyndon B. Johnson Space Center, at the first Moon landing 50th anniversary concert.

In late 2019, the band began working on a new full album, the plans of which were somewhat hindered due to the COVID-19 pandemic. However, the band pressed ahead with recording and mixing the new album, with each member working in isolation and collaborating through Zoom. No timeline for the completion and release of the album was ever announced.

On December 21, 2020, Petricca made an Instagram post on the Walk the Moon account announcing that Ray was no longer a part of the band due to "firsthand information which leads us to conclude that [he] has acted out of alignment with our values." Petricca, Waugaman, and Maiman would continue recording and performing as Walk the Moon, and Ray would not be included on the album they were recording.

In July 2021, the band announced the title of their fifth album called Heights, their first studio album in four years, with the first single called "Can You Handle My Love??" releasing on July 14, along with the tracks "Giants" and "I'm Good". The release was followed by dates for their Dream Plane Tour in Fall 2021.

On September 17, 2021, the band released their second single "Fire In Your House" which features Johnny and Jesse Clegg. On October 28, 2021, they released the single "Rise Up".

In late 2021 the band released the song "Win Anyway" for the film Rumble.

On July 15, 2023, Petricca announced that the band would be going on an indefinite hiatus.

On November 17, 2023, Walk the Moon released The Liftaway, which the band described as a "farewell-for-now album". The album contains a new version of the title track (originally from i Want! i Want!), two new studio tracks which draw significantly on stylistic elements from the band's earlier music, three rereleases of tracks from i Want! i Want!, and three remixes of other Walk the Moon tracks.

== Band members ==
Current members

- Nicholas William Petricca – lead vocals, keyboards, synthesizer, percussion (2006–present), bass (2009–2010, 2020–present)
- Sean Byron Waugaman – drums, percussion, backing vocals (2010–present)
- Eli Brose Maiman – guitar, backing vocals (2011–present), bass (2020–present)

Current touring musicians

- Lachlan "Lucky" West – keyboards, electronic drums, percussion, backing vocals (2017–present), bass (2020–present)

Former members

- Sam Cole – guitar, backing vocals (2006–2008)
- Ricky Human – drums (2006–2008)
- Adam Reifsnyder – bass, backing vocals (2006–2009)
- Adrian Galvin - drums (2008–2010)
- Nick Lerangis – guitar, backing vocals (2009)
- Chris Robinson – guitar, backing vocals (2010–2011)
- Kevin Colter Ray – bass, backing vocals (2010–2020)

Former touring musicians

- Brian Witon Sr. – percussion, backing vocals (2010–2013)

=== Timeline ===
The album i Want! i Want! was released in late 2010 as shown by the bar on the timeline, but it was recorded earlier when the band lineup consisted of Petricca, Lerangis, Reifsnyder, and Galvin.

== Discography ==
Studio albums

- I Want! I Want! (2010)
- Walk the Moon (2012)
- Talking Is Hard (2014)
- What If Nothing (2017)
- Heights (2021)

== Awards and nominations ==
| Year | Organization | Nominations | Award | Result | Ref. |
|---|---|---|---|---|---|
| 2012 | mtvU Woodie Awards | Walk the Moon | Breaking Woodie | Nominated | |
| 2013 | mtvU Woodie Awards | Walk the Moon | Woodie of the Year | Nominated | |
| 2015 | Teen Choice Awards | "Shut Up and Dance" | Choice Music: Party Song | Nominated | |
| 2015 | MTV Video Music Award | "Shut Up and Dance" | Best Rock Video | Nominated | |
| 2015 | American Music Award | Walk the Moon | New Artist of the Year | Nominated | |
| 2015 | American Music Award | Walk the Moon | Favorite Pop/Rock Band/Duo/Group | Nominated | |
| 2015 | American Music Award | Walk the Moon | Favorite Artist - Alternative Rock | Nominated | |
| 2016 | iHeartRadio Music Awards | "Shut Up and Dance" | Song of the Year | Nominated | |
| 2016 | iHeartRadio Music Awards | "Shut Up and Dance" | Alternative Rock; Song of the Year | Nominated | |
| 2016 | iHeartRadio Music Awards | Walk the Moon | Best Duo/Group of the Year | Nominated | |
| 2016 | Nickelodeon Kids' Choice Awards | Walk the Moon | Favorite New Artist | Nominated | |
| 2016 | ASCAP Pop Music Awards | Walk the Moon | Vanguard Award | Won | |
| 2016 | Billboard Music Award | "Shut Up and Dance" | Top Radio Song | Won | |
| 2016 | Billboard Music Award | "Shut Up and Dance" | Top Rock Song | Won | |
| 2016 | Billboard Music Award | Walk the Moon | Top Rock Artist | Nominated | |
| 2018 | New Music Awards | Walk the Moon | TOP40 New Group of the Year | Won | |
