= Halo Top Creamery =

Ice cream company

Eden Creamery LLC
- Industry: Frozen treats
- Founded: June 12, 2012; 14 years ago
- Headquarters: Los Angeles, California, U.S.
- Area served: United States, Australia, Mexico, Canada, Ireland, France, the Netherlands, Germany, South Korea, Hong Kong, Taiwan, Austria, Norway, Bahrain, Denmark, Croatia and the United Kingdom
- Products: frozen dairy dessert
- Parent: Wells Enterprises
- Website: halotop.com

Halo Top Creamery is a frozen dairy dessert company and brand sold in the United States, Australia, Mexico, Canada, Ireland, the Netherlands, Germany, Denmark, Taiwan, Hong Kong, South Korea, Austria, United Kingdom and the United Arab Emirates. The brand is marketed as a lower-calorie alternative, partially substituting sugar with stevia, a plant-based sweetener, and erythritol, a sugar alcohol.

== History ==
The ice cream brand was founded around 2011 by former attorney Justin Woolverton of Latham & Watkins LLP. Woolverton had begun making ice cream in his own kitchen with the goal of reducing his consumption of carbohydrates and refined sugars. In the early stages, Woolverton experimented with the recipe for over a year, tweaking and improving the ingredients. In order to create a long-lasting formula that could sustain shipment through the supply chain, Woolverton went to the Dairy Innovation Institute at California Polytechnic State University, San Luis Obispo, where he was able to refine and polish the formula with a contract manufacturer. The company describes its product as the first ever "lifestyle" ice cream that can be eaten daily without overwhelming a typical caloric intake diet, but nutritionists have expressed that "just because it's a slightly better choice does not mean that it is a good choice."

Halo Top launched in Los Angeles on June 15, 2012. Annual sales grew around 2,500% during 2016 and continued to increase in 2017. In July 2017, Halo Top became the best-selling ice cream pint at grocery stores in the United States, surpassing the Ben & Jerry's and Häagen-Dazs brands in popularity. By September 2017, it had grown to 50 employees and was sold throughout the United States, Australia, Mexico, Canada, Ireland, Germany, Finland, the Netherlands, and the United Kingdom.

In 2017, Halo Top won several international prizes, including an Institute of Taste Test Award, a Lausanne Index Clean Food Prize, and it was named "Food Disruptor of the Year" by Food Dive and one of The 25 Best Inventions of 2017 by Time magazine.

Halo Top's sales peaked in 2017 and declined for each of the following four years. The decline was attributed in substantial part to competition from major brands as well as private label products which made similar lower-calorie, lower-sugar products. Additionally, during the first year of the COVID-19 pandemic, consumers began to shift away from lower-calorie ice cream. Halo Top sales fell the most rapidly of all ice cream brands, even as ice cream sales as a category rose, led by high-fat "premium" brands such as Magnum and Häagen-Dazs.

The company was originally run by Woolverton and Doug Bouton, president and COO. Woolverton met Bouton, another former attorney, in an amateur basketball league. On September 9, 2019, Halo Top announced sale of its US operations to Wells Enterprises for an undisclosed amount. Since the acquisition, Halo Top has reformulated its low-calorie line, beginning with replacing spray-dried ultrafiltered milk proteins with liquid ultrafiltered milk, which is more expensive but which reduced the product's density, improved the texture, and allowed it to mix more smoothly with the other ingredients, leading to a mouthfeel that is closer to regular full-fat, full-sugar ice cream.

== Ingredients ==
Halo Top's ingredients are relatively low in calories and sugar and high in protein and fiber. Halo Top is a mixture of eggs, milk, and cream, and substitutes other ingredients for sugar. Halo Top uses organic stevia, a plant-based sweetener, and erythritol, a sugar alcohol, to substitute sugar in their frozen dairy dessert. Each pint ranges from 240 to 360 calories.

The ingredients used to make Halo Top frozen dairy dessert include:

- Skim milk, eggs, erythritol, prebiotic fiber, milk protein concentrate, cream, organic cane sugar, vegetable glycerin, natural flavors, sea salt, organic stevia leaf, organic carob gum, organic guar gum

The nutritional value of a pint of vanilla Halo Top “ice cream” is:

- 240 calories
- 8 grams of fat
- 24 grams of protein
- 20 grams of fiber

Halo Top offers an array of flavors, including dairy-free and vegan flavors. Consumers can also suggest new flavors online for the company team to consider bringing to market.

In Canada, although the ingredients lists are very similar to those in the U.S., all varieties of Halo Top are labelled as frozen desserts, not as ice cream, due to differences in legal labelling requirements.

== Variations ==
Halo Top ice cream is available in dairy pints, dairy-free pints, keto pints, pops, and mini pops. The original pops were first introduced in February 2019 and included the following flavors: Mint Chip, Peanut Butter Swirl, Chocolate Chip Cookie Dough, and Strawberry Cheesecake. Each pop contains only 50–60 calories. In May 2020, Halo Top released a larger version of the pops that contain 90–110 calories each. The original pops are now called Mini Pops and the larger versions are Pops. The larger Pops are available in the following flavors: Brownie Batter, Dark Chocolate Caramel, Mint Chip, Sea Salt Caramel, and Strawberry Swirl.

== Locations ==
In 2018, Halo Top opened three "Scoop Shop" locations in Los Angeles, CA in Westfield Topanga, Canoga Park; at The Grove; and in Century City. These Scoop Shop locations offer soft serve, scoops, sundaes, and sandwiches with various toppings to choose from. The company closed all three on October 28, 2019.

== See also ==
- List of ice cream brands
