= Yoke Lore =

American musician

- Born: Adrian Galvin; 27 December 1989 (age 36)
- Origin: Katonah, New York
- Genres: Indie rock, indie folk
- Occupations: Singer-songwriter, multi-instrumentalist. composer
- Instruments: Vocals, banjo, percussion
- Years active: 2012–present
- Labels: B3Sci Records, ILA, Big Indie, Yell House Records
- Website: www.yokelore.com

Adrian Galvin, better known by his moniker Yoke Lore, is an American multi-instrumentalist, dancer, and visual artist from New York, United States. Before going solo Galvin was a member of Walk the Moon and Yellerkin.

== Early life ==
Galvin is from Katonah, New York, and both his parents were creative professionals who encouraged him to explore the arts. His brother is actor and singer Noah Galvin. His mother is Jewish and his father was Catholic. Galvin's father died in November 2023, after a long battle with illness. Galvin attended Kenyon College where he began writing songs and playing drums for the band Walk the Moon. He split with the band to form a short-lived project called Yellerkin in 2013. Galvin lived in a monastery in India for a time after college. Yellerkin, which was based in Brooklyn, was co-founded with producer Luca Buccellati.

== Yoke Lore ==
He released his first EP as Yoke Lore in 2016, and soon after performed at SXSW and toured internationally. Galvin is also a dancer and founded a dance group called Boomerang in 2016.

In late 2017, he released a video for the song "Beige". Late in 2019, he released the single "Dead Ringer". Early in 2020, he collaborated with Jax Anderson on the single "Sensitive Heart".

== Discography ==
=== LPs ===
- Toward a Never Ending New Beginning (Yell House Records, September 22, 2023)

=== EPs ===
- Far Shore (B3SCI Records, May 6, 2016)
- Goodpain (ILA / Yell House Records, June 16, 2017)
- Yoke Lore on Audiotree Live- EP (Audiotree Music, August 28, 2017)
- Goodpain Remix EP (Big Indie / Yell House Records, January 12, 2018)
- Absolutes (Big Indie / Yell House Records, July 27, 2018)
- Meditations (Yell House Records, 2019)

=== Singles ===
- "Goodpain / Truly Madly Deeply – Recorded at Spotify Studios NYC" (October 11, 2017)
- "Last Christmas – Recorded at Spotify Studios NYC" (November 29, 2017)
- "Everybody Wants to Be Loved" with NVDES (August 30, 2019)
- "Chin Up / Safe and Sound (Mahogany Sessions)" (September 12, 2019
- "Dead Ringer" (September 27, 2019)
- "Bravado / Body Parts" (November 8, 2019)
- "Sensitive Heart" with Jax Anderson (February 14, 2020)
- "Fade Away" (August 7, 2020)
- "Shock Flesh" (May 13, 2022)
- ”Winona” (May 11, 2023)
- ”The Score” (August 16, 2024)
- ”Hyperventilate” (August 6, 2025)
- "Just like Idiots" with Superjava (Mars 27, 2025)

=== Remixes ===
- "Stoned" (Yoke Lore Remix) by Blondage (2017)
- "Lovesick." (Yoke Lore Remix) by Finlay (2019)
- "All the Same" (Yoke Lore Remix) by Future Generations (2019)

=== Appearances ===
- "Stringsnoise" on the album Good Death by Samuel Proffitt (November 30, 2018)
- "Wanted a Name" on the album Vacation by Frenship (January 16, 2019)

=== Compositions for film ===
- Pink Skies Ahead (2019)
