= Walk the Moon discography =

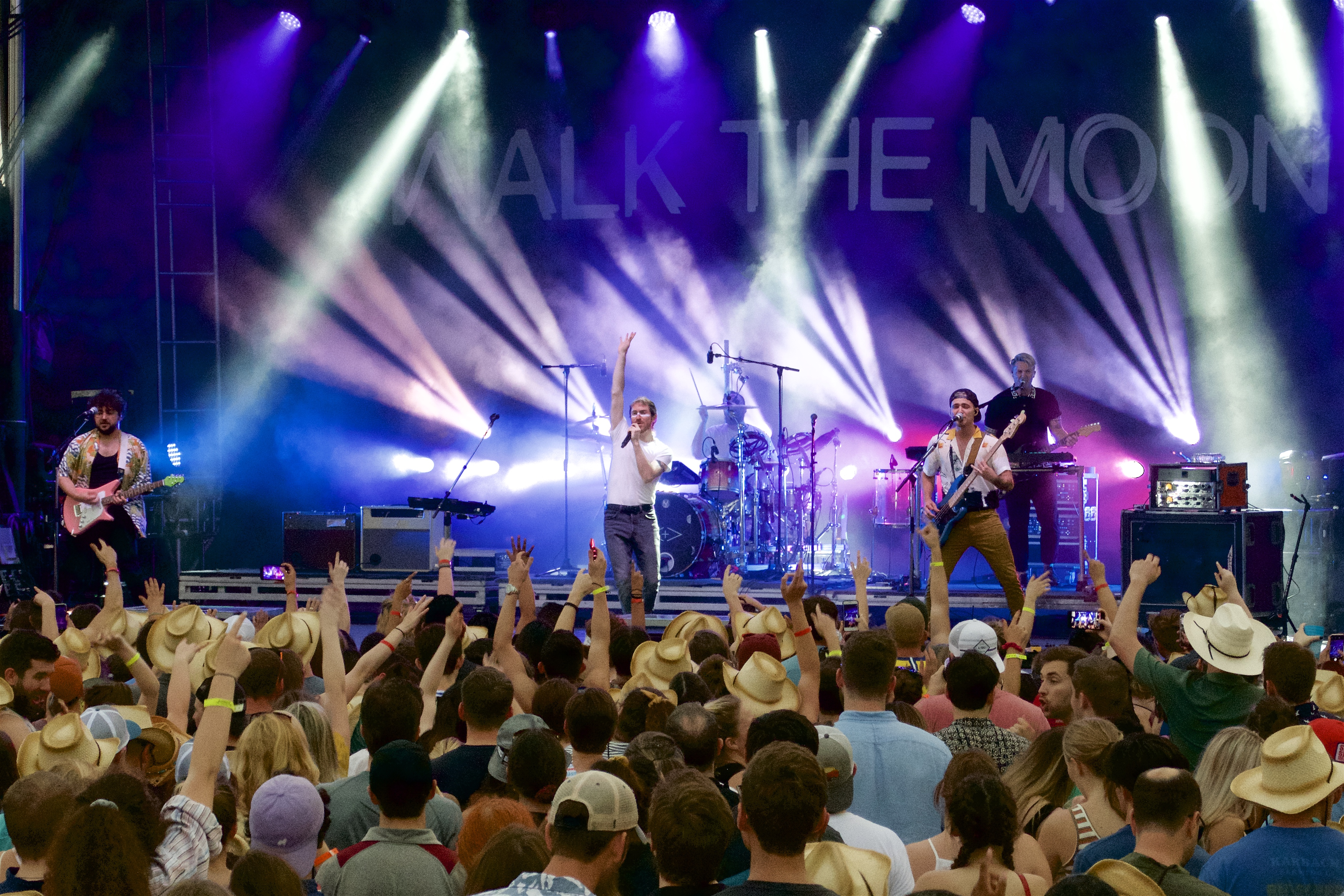
- Walk the Moon at the 2019 Love Street Music Fest in Houston, Texas
- Studio albums: 4
- EPs: 7
- Live albums: 1
- Compilation albums: 2
- Singles: 10
- Music videos: 19
- Promotional singles: 4

American rock band Walk the Moon has released five studio albums, one live album, one compilation album, seven extended plays, ten singles (including two as featured artists), four promotional singles, and nineteen music videos. Walk the Moon was formed in 2006 in Cincinnati, Ohio as Wicked in the Mix, originally consisting of Nicholas Petricca, Adam Reifsnyder, Sam Cole and Ricky Human, the former two having attended Kenyon College together. The group's first EP, entitled The Anthem, would be released later that same year in March. Wicked in the Mix later self-released their only studio album, WM in June 2007. The band's lineup would begin to go through several different member changes throughout the next three years, leaving Petricca as the only member from the original group.

The band self-released their first studio album I Want! I Want! in November 2010. In 2011, a final lineup change was formed with bassist Kevin Ray, drummer Sean Waugaman, and guitarist Eli Maiman. Walk the Moon signed with RCA Records to release their first major-label album, self-titled Walk the Moon, many of which are re-recordings of the songs from I Want! I Want!. On its release in June 2012, the album entered the top forty on the Billboard 200, debuting at number 36. The band's first single from that album, "Anna Sun", peaked at number ten on Billboard's Alternative Songs chart. The second single, "Tightrope", had moderate success on the Alternative Songs chart, peaking at number fifteen.

Walk the Moon's third studio album, Talking Is Hard, was released in December 2014. The album reached number 14 on the Billboard 200, making it Walk the Moon's first album to reach the top twenty, and has since been certified Platinum by the Recording Industry Association of America (RIAA). Its lead single, "Shut Up and Dance", was a commercial success worldwide. It peaked at number four on the Billboard Hot 100, and topped the Alternative Songs chart for four consecutive weeks. The album's opening track, "Different Colors", impacted alternative radio stations in May 2015 and was released as the next single from Talking Is Hard. The song became Walk the Moon's second consecutive top ten hit on the Alternative Songs chart, peaking at number seven.

Following a year-long hiatus, the band's fourth studio album, What If Nothing, was released in November 2017 and debuted at number 40 on the Billboard 200. It contained the top ten Alternative Songs singles "One Foot" and "Kamikaze", the former of which peaked at number one on the chart for four consecutive weeks and was certified Gold by the RIAA. The song was also Walk the Moon's second entry on the Hot 100, reaching number 65. The band released "Timebomb" as a stand-alone single in 2019 and became Walk the Moon's seventh song to reach the top 20 on the Alternative Songs chart as lead artists, peaking at number 13. Following Ray's departure from the band in 2020, their fifth and final studio album, Heights, was released in November 2021. The lead single preceding its release, "Can You Handle My Love??", peaked at number six on the Alternative Airplay chart.

== Albums ==
=== Studio albums ===
List of studio albums, with selected chart positions
Title	Album details	Peak chart positions										Certifications
Title	Album details	US	US Alt.	US Rock	AUS	CAN	FRA	JPN	NZ Heat	SCO	UK	Certifications
I Want! I Want!	Released: November 16, 2010 (US); Label: Self-released; Format: CD, digital download	—	—	—	—	—	—	—	—	—	—	
Walk the Moon	Released: June 19, 2012 (US); Label: RCA; Format: CD, LP, digital download	36	8	15	— (Note: Walk the Moon did not enter the Australian ARIA Albums Chart but peaked at number 13 on the ARIA Hitseekers Chart.)	—	—	—	—	—	115	
Talking Is Hard	Released: December 2, 2014 (US); Label: RCA; Format: CD, LP, digital download	14	1	3	85	31	126	148	—	37	53	RIAA: Platinum; MC: Gold; RMNZ: Platinum
What If Nothing	Released: November 10, 2017 (US); Label: RCA; Format: CD, LP, digital download	40	3	5	—	—	—	—	8	—	— (Note: What If Nothing did not enter the UK Albums chart, but peaked at number 60 on the UK Album Downloads chart.)	
Heights	Released: November 12, 2021; Label: RCA; Format: CD, LP, digital download	—	—	—	—	—	—	—	—	—	—	
"—" denotes an album that did not chart or was not released.

=== Live albums ===
List of live albums
Title	Album details	Peak
Title	Album details	US
You Are Not Alone (Live at the Greek)	Released: February 26, 2016 (US); Label: RCA; Format: LP, digital download	186

=== Compilation albums ===
List of compilation albums
Title	Album details
The Other Side: B-Sides and Rarities	Released: March 9, 2009 (US); Label: Self-released; Format: CD, digital download
The Liftaway	Released: November 17, 2023; Label: RCA; Format: digital download

== Extended plays ==
List of extended plays
Title	EP details	Peak positions		
Title	EP details	US	US Alt.	US Rock
The Anthem	Released: March 6, 2008 (US); Label: Self-released; Format: CD, digital download	—	—	—
Anna Sun	Released: February 7, 2012; Label: RCA; Format: CD, digital download	—	—	—
Spotify Sessions	Released: April 3, 2012 (US); Label: RCA; Format: Stream	—	—	—
iTunes Festival: London 2012	Released: September 10, 2012 (US); Label: RCA; Format: Digital download	—	—	—
Tightrope	Released: January 18, 2013 (US); Label: RCA; Format: LP, digital download	54	12	15
Different Colors	Released: December 4, 2015 (US); Label: RCA; Format: Digital download	—	—	—
Timebomb <Live>	Released: May 3, 2019; Label: RCA; Format: Digital download	—	—	—
"—" denotes an album that did not chart or was not released.

== Singles ==
=== As lead artists ===
List of singles, with selected chart positions and certifications, showing year released and album name
Title	Year	Peak chart positions										Certifications	Album
Title	Year	US	US Rock	AUS	AUT	CAN	CZ	GER	IRE	SWE	UK	Certifications	Album
"Anna Sun"	2012	— (Note: "Anna Sun" did not enter the Billboard Hot 100, but peaked at number 18 on the Bubbling Under Hot 100 Singles chart, which acts as an extension to the Hot 100.)	20	—	—	—	—	—	—	—	82	RIAA: 2× Platinum	Walk the Moon
"Tightrope"	2012	—	27	—	—	—	—	—	—	—	—		Walk the Moon
"Shut Up and Dance"	2014	4	1	3	7	4	2	10	2	12	4	RIAA: 14× Platinum; ARIA: 15× Platinum; BPI: 7× Platinum; BVMI: 2× Platinum; GLF: 4× Platinum; IFPI AUT: Gold; MC: 7× Platinum	Talking Is Hard
"Different Colors"	2015	— (Note: "Different Colors" did not enter the Billboard Hot 100, but peaked at number three on the US Hot Singles Sales chart.)	26	—	—	—	—	—	—	—	—		Talking Is Hard
"Work This Body"	2016	—	— (Note: "Work This Body" did not enter the US Hot Rock & Alternative Songs chart, but peaked at number 34 on the US Alternative Airplay chart.)	—	—	—	—	—	—	—	— (Note: "Work This Body" did not enter the UK Singles Chart, but peaked at number 100 on the UK Singles Sales Chart.)	RIAA: Gold	Talking Is Hard
"One Foot"	2017	65	4	—	—	—	—	—	—	— (Note: "One Foot" did not enter the Sverigetopplistan singles chart, but peaked at number 16 on the Sverigetopplistan Heatseeker chart.)	—	RIAA: Platinum	What If Nothing
"Kamikaze"	2018	—	19	—	—	—	—	—	—	—	—		What If Nothing
"Timebomb"	2019	—	16	—	—	—	—	—	—	—	—		Non-album singles
"Eat Your Heart Out"	2019	—	—	—	—	—	—	—	—	—	—		Non-album singles
"Lose Your Again" (featuring Bråves)	2019	—	—	—	—	—	—	—	—	—	—		Non-album singles
"Can You Handle My Love??"	2021	—	— (Note: "Can You Handle My Love??" did not enter the US Hot Rock & Alternative Songs chart, but peaked at number 15 on the US Rock & Alternative Airplay chart.)	—	—	—	—	—	—	—	—		Heights
"Fire in Your House" (featuring Johnny Clegg and Jesse Clegg)	2021	—	—	—	—	—	—	—	—	—	—		Heights
"Rise Up"	2021	—	—	—	—	—	—	—	—	—	—		Heights
"Win Anyway"	2021	—	—	—	—	—	15	—	—	—	—		Non-album single
"Giants"	2022	—	— (Note: "Giants" did not enter the US Hot Rock & Alternative Songs chart, but peaked at number 24 on the US Alternative Airplay chart.)	—	—	—	—	—	—	—	—		Heights
"—" denotes a single that did not chart or was not released.

=== Promotional singles ===
List of promotional singles, showing year released and album name
Title	Year	Album
"Burning Down the House"	2013	Walk the Moon
"Headphones"	2017	What If Nothing
"Surrender"	2017	What If Nothing
"Tiger Teeth"	2018	What If Nothing
"Heights"	2021	Heights
"DNA (The Keys)"	2021	Heights

=== As featured artist ===
List of singles as featured artist, showing year released and album name
Title	Year	Peak chart positions			Album
Title	Year	US AAA	US Dance	US Rock	Album
"Back 2 U" (Steve Aoki and Boehm featuring Walk the Moon)	2016	—	23	—	Non-album single
"Home" (Morgxn featuring Walk the Moon)	2018	9	—	24	Vital

== Other charting songs ==
List of songs, with selected chart positions, showing year released and album name
Title	Year	Peak chart positions				Album
Title	Year	US Alt.	US Rock	SCO	UK	Album
"Ghostbusters"	2016	—	— (Note: "Ghostbusters" did not enter the US Hot Rock & Alternative chart, but peaked at number 31 on the US Rock Digital Song Sales chart.)	70	—	Ghostbusters (Original Motion Picture Soundtrack)
"Lost in the Wild"	2017	— (Note: "Lost in the Wild" did not enter the US Hot Alternative Songs chart, but peaked at number 15 on the US Alternative Digital Song Sales chart.)	— (Note: "Lost in the Wild" did not enter the US Hot Rock & Alternative chart, but peaked at number five on the US Rock Digital Song Sales chart.)	62	— (Note: "Lost in the Wild" did not enter the UK Singles Chart, but peaked at number 61 on the UK Singles Sales Chart.)	What If Nothing
"—" denotes a song that did not chart or was not released.

== Other appearances ==
Title	Year	Album
"Big Bad Wolves"	2013	Iron Man 3: Heroes Fall (Music Inspired By the Motion Picture)
"Best for Last" (The Knocks featuring Walk the Moon)	2016	55
"Ghostbusters"	2016	Ghostbusters (Original Motion Picture Soundtrack)

== Music videos ==
List of music videos, showing year released and directors
Title	Year	Director(s)	Ref.
"Anna Sun"	2010	Patrick Meier	
"Quesadilla"	2012	-	
"Next in Line"	2012	-	
"Tightrope" (Note: The band originally created a music video for "Tightrope" as a part of the "7in7" video series. Another music video was made for the song later that year.)	2012	-	
"Jenny"	2012	-	
"Shiver Shiver"	2012	-	
"Iscariot"	2012	-	
"I Can Lift a Car"	2012	-	
"Tightrope"	2012	Ari Costa	
"Shut Up and Dance"	2014	Josh Forbes	
"Different Colors"	2015	Nathan Crooker, Patrick Nichols	
"Work This Body"	2016	Walk the Moon, Isaac Rentz	
"Back 2 U"	2016	-	-
"One Foot"	2017	Robert Hales	
"Kamikaze"	2018	Tobias Nathan	-
"Tiger Teeth"	2018	Dusty Kessler, Eric Maldin	-
"Timebomb"	2019	Tobias Nathan	
"Eat Your Heart Out"	2019	-	
"Lose You Again"	2019	-	
"Can You Handle My Love??"	2021	-	
