= Timebomb (Walk the Moon song) =

2019 single by Walk the Moon

Single by Walk the Moon
- Released: January 11, 2019
- Genre: Dance-pop; new wave; pop
- Length: 3:38
- Label: RCA
- Songwriters: James Alan; Nicholas Petricca; Oscar Holter
- Producers: Mike Crossey; Oscar Holter

Walk the Moon singles chronology
"Home" (2018)	"Timebomb" (2019)	"Can You Handle My Love??" (2021)

Music video
- "Timebomb" on YouTube

"Timebomb" is a song by American pop rock band Walk the Moon. The song was released digitally by RCA Records as a stand-alone single on January 11, 2019. It was written by James Alan, Nicholas Petricca, and Oscar Holter, with the latter also handling the production with Mike Crossey. Musically, it is described as a dance-pop, new wave, and pop song that utilizes synthesizers and guitars. Its lyrics describe the fear of falling in love but going through with the risk. This was the band's last single recorded with bassist Kevin Ray, who parted ways with the band in December 2020.

"Timebomb" was positively received by most music critics, with many of them commenting on its 80s-inspired dance sound and comparing it to the band's earlier single "Shut Up and Dance". It peaked at number 13 on the Billboard Alternative Songs chart, becoming Walk the Moon's seventh song to chart within the top 20. The song's music video, which features the band performing against various colorful backgrounds, was released on January 23, 2019. "Timebomb" was performed live on The Tonight Show Starring Jimmy Fallon and Jimmy Kimmel Live!.

== Background and release ==
"Timebomb" was written by lead singer Nicholas Petricca, James Alan, and Oscar Holter; the latter also produced the track with Mike Crossey, who handled the production for most of the songs on Walk the Moon's third studio album, What If Nothing (2017). The song was mixed by Neal Avron and mastered by Chris Gehringer. Guitarist Eli Maiman spoke with The Red & Black about how the band is "always writing" and "coming up with new ideas" when they are "on [and off] the road and when [they are] in soundcheck". Maiman recalled the band going into the studio to record some tunes and being excited when creating the track, saying: "We had this song that we wanted to put out so we just did it, you know? And it feels really good."

The song was released to digital retailers through RCA Records as a stand-alone single on January 11, 2019. It was sent to US alternative radio stations through RCA Records on January 15, 2019. An extended play was later released on May 3, 2019, featuring the original and live version of "Timebomb", a remix done by Ryan Riback, and a producer's mix of the track. A video for the live version, performed from the Georgia Theater in Athens, Georgia, was uploaded to Walk the Moon's YouTube channel on May 2, 2019. When asked about whether "Timebomb" is its own entity or would be on an upcoming album, Petricca thought it would inevitably "be part of a record at some point". However, the song ended up not appearing on the band's next studio album, Heights (2021).

== Composition and lyrics ==
"Timebomb" has been described as a dance-pop, new wave, and pop song by music journalists. Maiman said that the track "feels like a return to form in terms of high energy, very colorful music". Writing for Rolling Stone, Patrick Doyle mentioned that the song is composed "of jagged synths and choppy guitars with a huge eighties throwback chorus in the vein of Jack Antonoff". The band contemplates the question of whether to love or not to love: "Afraid to light the fuse again; start a fire, lose a friend. But when your heart opens it's like I'm ready to fall again." In an interview with Global News, Petricca stated that the lyrics for "Timebomb" are "about the fear of falling in love", mentioning that it is "a very scary [but] good thing". He specified what he meant by saying: "Love is risky. It could end, or you might mess it up or so on. But it's because it's precious that it's really worth it. It's a complete gamble. Love is inevitable, and there's really nothing you can do about it; there's really no choice."

== Critical reception ==
"Timebomb" received mostly positive reviews from music critics. Mitch Mosk, writing for Atwood Magazine, described the song as "an explosive shout-your-heart-out singalong full of the band's familiar pop passion". Patrick Doyle of Rolling Stone called "Timebomb" a "dancefloor stomper" that "echoes [the] big sound of [the band's] 2014 smash 'Shut Up and Dance'" and marks "a return to the full-on dance sound of their massive hit". Billboard magazine's Angelica Acevedo said that it is an "upbeat track" that "depicts the all-too-common feeling of being wary about falling in love, but going at it full force anyway". James Christopher Monger of AllMusic referred to it as "another effervescent single" from the band. Chris DeVille of Stereogum wrote that the track is "a perfectly OK entry into that neon-'80s-pop-as-filtered-through-Passion-Pit genre", but commented that "it doesn't have the same spark" as "Shut Up and Dance". On Alternative Addiction's list of their "Top 100 Songs of 2019", "Timebomb" placed at number 14. It was also included on their top 200 "Best of the 2010s" list at number 198.

== Commercial performance ==
"Timebomb" debuted at number 22 on the US Billboard Alternative Songs chart on the week ending January 25, 2019. It later peaked at number 13 on the chart dated March 1, 2019, and spent 11 weeks on the chart, making it Walk the Moon's seventh song to chart within the top 20. On the US Hot Rock Songs chart, the song peaked at number 16 on the week ending January 25, 2019, and spent nine weeks in total on the chart. It experienced less success on the Rock Airplay chart, reaching number 21 on the week ending March 1, 2019, and left the chart after 11 weeks.

== Music video ==
The music video for "Timebomb" premiered on Walk the Moon's YouTube account on January 23, 2019. The video was directed by Tobias Nathan, who had previously directed the band's music video for "Kamikaze" in 2018. It involves the band singing and playing against color-coded backgrounds. while close-ups of women's faces flash between it. During the video, Petricca is seen dancing vigorously in several scenes, while drummer Sean Waugaman occasionally bashes a bright yellow drum set. Ryan Reed of Rolling Stone mentioned how the video was reminiscent of The White Stripes' "stark colors and minimalism". Randy Holmes of ABC News Radio said it is "essentially an Instagram profile come to life".

== Live performances ==
On February 19, 2019, Walk the Moon performed "Timebomb" on The Tonight Show Starring Jimmy Fallon from a "minimal stage set up with cool-toned flashing lights". The song was also performed on Jimmy Kimmel Live! as part of Kimmel's Mercedes-Benz Concert Series, along with "Headphones", "Portugal", "Avalanche", and "One Foot". A video of the band performing a stripped down acoustic version of "Timebomb" in Vevo's white studio was uploaded to YouTube on May 9, 2019.

== Track listing ==
Digital download
No.	Title	Length
1.	"Timebomb"	3:38

Digital download – Live EP
No.	Title	Length
1.	"Timebomb" (Live Version)	3:51
2.	"Timebomb" (Ryan Riback Remix)	3:31
3.	"Timebomb" (Producer's Mix)	3:39
4.	"Timebomb"	3:38

== Credits and personnel ==
Credits adapted from Tidal.

- Nicholas Petricca – vocals, keyboards, programming, songwriting
- Kevin Ray – bass
- Sean Waugaman – drums, percussion
- Eli Maiman – guitar
- James Alan – songwriting
- Mike Crossey – production, keyboards, programming
- Oscar Holter – production, keyboards, programming, songwriting
- Scott Skrzynski – assistant engineering
- Stephen Sesso – engineering
- Neal Avron – mixing
- Chris Gehringer – mastering

== Charts ==
=== Weekly charts ===
Weekly chart performance for "Timebomb"
Chart (2019)	Peak position
US Hot Rock & Alternative Songs (Billboard)	16
US Rock & Alternative Airplay (Billboard)	21

== Release history ==
Release dates and formats for "Timebomb"
Region	Date	Format	Label(s)	Ref.
Various	January 11, 2019	Digital download; streaming	RCA; Sony	
United States	January 15, 2019	Alternative radio	RCA; Sony	
Various	May 3, 2019	Live EP	RCA; Sony	
