= 2015 in downloadable songs for the Rock Band series =

- Songs released: 85
- Packs released: 5
- Albums released: 0

The Rock Band series of music video games supports downloadable songs for the Xbox 360, Xbox One, PlayStation 3 and PlayStation 4 versions through the consoles' respective online services. Users can download songs on a track-by-track basis, with many of the tracks also offered as part of a "song pack" or complete album at a discounted rate. All songs that are available to Rock Band 3 are playable in Rock Band Blitz.

Harmonix previously announced in February 2013 that it would stop regularly releasing new DLC songs for the Rock Band series after April 2, 2013, in order to focus on other projects, ending over 280 consecutive weeks of weekly releases dating back to 2007. On January 12, 2015, Harmonix announced that it would release three new DLC songs for the PlayStation 3 and Xbox 360 versions of Rock Band 3 on January 13, 2015, the first in nearly 21 months. The sudden release, along with a survey posted by Harmonix a few days later, hinted at the possibility of a new Rock Band game for eighth generation consoles.

Rock Band 4 was unveiled in March 2015, and released on October 6, 2015.

== List of songs released in 2015 ==
The following table lists the available songs for the Rock Band series released in 2015. All songs available in packs are also available as individual song downloads on the same date, unless otherwise noted. Dates listed are the initial release of songs on PlayStation Network and Xbox Live.

Starting from October 6, 2015, all music added to the downloadable content catalog is exclusive to Rock Band 4. In addition, due to changes in the charting format and gameplay of Rock Band 4, the released songs no longer support keyboard or Pro guitar and bass (future downloadable content will continue to support vocal harmonies and Pro drum charts), and most songs no longer display "family friendly" or "supervision recommended" ratings. Downloadable content from previous Rock Band titles (excepting The Beatles: Rock Band) is forward-compatible in Rock Band 4 within the same system family (Xbox 360 downloads are usable in the Xbox One version and PlayStation 3 downloads are usable in the PlayStation 4 version) at no additional cost.

Song title	Artist	Year	Genre	Single / Pack name	Release date	Family Friendly	Additional Rock Band 3 Features
"R U Mine?" (Note: Song is not available for the Wii platform.)	Arctic Monkeys	2012	Rock	Single	Jan 13, 2015	No	Core
"Shepherd of Fire"	Avenged Sevenfold	2013	Metal	Single	Jan 13, 2015	No	Core
"Something from Nothing"	Foo Fighters	2014	Alternative	Single	Jan 13, 2015	No	Core
"Rize of the Fenix"	Tenacious D	2012	Rock	Single	Feb 17, 2015	No	Core
"Back to the Shack"	Weezer	2014	Alternative	Single	Feb 17, 2015	No	Core
"I Still Believe" (Note: Song is available at no cost.)	Frank Turner	2011	Rock	Single	Mar 5, 2015	Yes	Core
"My Own Eyes" (Note: Song is no longer available for purchase.)	"Weird Al" Yankovic	2014	Novelty	Single	Oct 6, 2015	—N/a	
"Divide"	All That Remains	2014	Metal	Single	Oct 6, 2015	—N/a	
"What If I Was Nothing"	All That Remains	2012	Metal	Single	Oct 6, 2015	—N/a	
"Gimme Chocolate!!"	Babymetal	2014	Metal	Single	Oct 6, 2015	—N/a	
"Run for Cover"	Blitz Kids	2014	Pop-Rock	Single	Oct 6, 2015	—N/a	
"Throne"	Bring Me the Horizon	2015	Nu-Metal	Single	Oct 6, 2015	—N/a	
"Mona Lisa"	Dead Sara	2015	Alternative	Single	Oct 6, 2015	—N/a	
"The Reflex"	Duran Duran	1983	Pop-Rock	Single	Oct 6, 2015	—N/a	
"September"	Earth, Wind & Fire	1978	R&B/Soul/Funk	Single	Oct 6, 2015	—N/a	
"All the Rage Back Home"	Interpol	2014	Indie Rock	Single	Oct 6, 2015	—N/a	
"Move Over"	Janis Joplin	1971	Classic Rock	Single	Oct 6, 2015	—N/a	
"Jane"	Jefferson Starship	1979	Classic Rock	Single	Oct 6, 2015	—N/a	
"Rebellion (ft. Daron Malakian)"	Linkin Park	2014	Nu-Metal	Single	Oct 6, 2015	—N/a	
"The Mephistopheles of Los Angeles"	Marilyn Manson	2015	Metal	Single	Oct 6, 2015	—N/a	
"High Road"	Mastodon	2014	Metal	Single	Oct 6, 2015	—N/a	
"One Big Holiday"	My Morning Jacket	2003	Southern Rock	Single	Oct 6, 2015	—N/a	
"Would You Still Be There"	Of Mice & Men	2014	Nu-Metal	Single	Oct 6, 2015	—N/a	
"Sugar, You"	Oh Honey	2015	Indie Rock	Single	Oct 6, 2015	—N/a	
"Cowboys from Hell (Live from Monsters in Moscow Festival)"	Pantera	1991	Metal	Single	Oct 6, 2015	—N/a	
"King for a Day (ft. Kellin Quinn)"	Pierce the Veil	2012	Emo	Single	Oct 6, 2015	—N/a	
"Summertime Boy"	Seasick Steve	2015	Blues	Single	Oct 6, 2015	—N/a	
"Backwoods Company"	The Wild Feathers	2013	Southern Rock	Single	Oct 6, 2015	—N/a	
"Don't Wanna Fight"	Alabama Shakes	2015	Southern Rock	Single	Oct 13, 2015	—N/a	
"Failure"	Breaking Benjamin	2015	Rock	Single	Oct 13, 2015	—N/a	
"Trainwreck 1979"	Death from Above 1979	2014	Rock	Single	Oct 13, 2015	—N/a	
"Follow Me Down"	The Pretty Reckless	2014	Rock	Single	Oct 13, 2015	—N/a	
"Cryin'"	Aerosmith	1993	Rock	Aerosmith Hits 02	Oct 19, 2015	—N/a	
"Dude (Looks Like a Lady)"	Aerosmith	1987	Rock	Aerosmith Hits 02	Oct 19, 2015	—N/a	
"Eat the Rich"	Aerosmith	1993	Rock	Aerosmith Hits 02	Oct 19, 2015	—N/a	
"Love in an Elevator"	Aerosmith	1989	Rock	Aerosmith Hits 02	Oct 19, 2015	—N/a	
"Rats in the Cellar"	Aerosmith	1976	Rock	Aerosmith Hits 02	Oct 19, 2015	—N/a	
"Seasons of Wither"	Aerosmith	1974	Rock	Aerosmith Hits 02	Oct 19, 2015	—N/a	
"Always Something There to Remind Me"	Naked Eyes	1983	New Wave	Single	Oct 27, 2015	—N/a	
"People Are People"	Depeche Mode	1984	Pop/Dance/Electronic	Single	Oct 27, 2015	—N/a	
"What You Need"	INXS	1985	Pop-Rock	Single	Oct 27, 2015	—N/a	
"Bad Case of Loving You (Doctor, Doctor)"	Robert Palmer	1979	Pop-Rock	Single	Nov 4, 2015	—N/a	
"Long Cool Woman in a Black Dress"	The Hollies	1971	Classic Rock	Single	Nov 4, 2015	—N/a	
"Lust for Life"	Iggy Pop	1977	Rock	Single	Nov 4, 2015	—N/a	
"Like a Stone"	Audioslave	2002	Rock	Single	Nov 9, 2015	—N/a	
"Awake"	Godsmack	2000	Nu-Metal	Single	Nov 9, 2015	—N/a	
"Lying from You"	Linkin Park	2003	Nu-Metal	Single	Nov 9, 2015	—N/a	
"Bad Catholics" (Note: Song was only available as part of a special promotion.)	The Barbazons	2015	Indie Rock	Single	Nov 11, 2015	—N/a	
"Sing"	Ed Sheeran	2014	Pop-Rock	Single	Nov 17, 2015	—N/a	
"Young Blood" (Note: Song is only available bundled with "Sing" by Ed Sheeran.)	Saint Raymond	2015	Pop-Rock	Single	Nov 17, 2015	—N/a	
"Riptide"	Vance Joy	2013	Indie Rock	Single	Nov 17, 2015	—N/a	
"Shut Up and Dance"	Walk the Moon	2014	Pop-Rock	Single	Nov 17, 2015	—N/a	
"And The Cradle Will Rock..."	Van Halen	1980	Rock	Van Halen Hits 01	Nov 24, 2015	—N/a	
"Ain't Talkin' 'bout Love"	Van Halen	1978	Rock	Van Halen Hits 01	Nov 24, 2015	—N/a	
"Dance the Night Away"	Van Halen	1979	Rock	Van Halen Hits 01	Nov 24, 2015	—N/a	
"Hot for Teacher"	Van Halen	1984	Rock	Van Halen Hits 01	Nov 24, 2015	—N/a	
"Runnin' with the Devil"	Van Halen	1979	Rock	Van Halen Hits 01	Nov 24, 2015	—N/a	
"Unchained"	Van Halen	1981	Rock	Van Halen Hits 01	Nov 24, 2015	—N/a	
"Dreams"	Beck	2015	Alternative	Off the Charts 01	Dec 1, 2015	—N/a	
"Electric Love"	BØRNS	2015	Pop/Dance/Electronic	Off the Charts 01	Dec 1, 2015	—N/a	
"Cocoon"	Catfish and the Bottlemen	2015	Indie Rock	Off the Charts 01	Dec 1, 2015	—N/a	
"First"	Cold War Kids	2015	Indie Rock	Off the Charts 01	Dec 1, 2015	—N/a	
"Renegades"	X Ambassadors	2015	Alternative	Off the Charts 01	Dec 1, 2015	—N/a	
"The Coma Machine"	Between the Buried and Me	2015	Prog	Single	Dec 8, 2015	—N/a	
"Heir Apparent"	Opeth	2008	Prog	Single	Dec 8, 2015	—N/a	
"Nevermore"	Symphony X	2015	Prog	Single	Dec 8, 2015	—N/a	
"Ex's and Oh's"	Elle King	2015	Alternative	Off the Charts 02	Dec 15, 2015	—N/a	
"Can't Feel My Face"	The Weeknd	2015	Pop/Dance/Electronic	Off the Charts 02	Dec 15, 2015	—N/a	
"Irresistible"	Fall Out Boy	2015	Pop-Rock	Off the Charts 02	Dec 15, 2015	—N/a	
"Different Colors"	Walk the Moon	2015	Pop-Rock	Off the Charts 02	Dec 15, 2015	—N/a	
"Stitches"	Shawn Mendes	2015	Pop-Rock	Off the Charts 02	Dec 15, 2015	—N/a	
"Sunday Bloody Sunday"	U2	1983	Rock	U2 Essentials 01	Dec 22, 2015	—N/a	
"Pride (In the Name of Love)"	U2	1984	Rock	U2 Essentials 01	Dec 22, 2015	—N/a	
"Where the Streets Have No Name"	U2	1987	Rock	U2 Essentials 01	Dec 22, 2015	—N/a	
"Desire"	U2	1988	Rock	U2 Essentials 01	Dec 22, 2015	—N/a	
"One"	U2	1991	Rock	U2 Essentials 01	Dec 22, 2015	—N/a	
"Vertigo"	U2	2004	Rock	U2 Essentials 01	Dec 22, 2015	—N/a	
"California (There Is No End to Love)"	U2	2014	Rock	U2 Essentials 01	Dec 22, 2015	—N/a	
"The Miracle (Of Joey Ramone)"	U2	2014	Rock	U2 Essentials 01	Dec 22, 2015	—N/a	
"Adventure of a Lifetime"	Coldplay	2015	Alternative	Single	Dec 29, 2015	—N/a	
"Drag Me Down"	One Direction	2015	Pop/Dance/Electronic	Single	Dec 29, 2015	—N/a	
"Thank God for Girls"	Weezer	2015	Alternative	Single	Dec 29, 2015	—N/a	
"What Do You Mean?"	Justin Bieber	2015	Pop/Dance/Electronic	Single	Dec 29, 2015	—N/a	
"On My Mind"	Ellie Goulding	2015	Pop/Dance/Electronic	Single	Dec 29, 2015	—N/a	
"Leave the Night On"	Sam Hunt	2014	Country	Single	Dec 29, 2015	—N/a	
