= Eat Your Heart Out =

Eat Your Heart Out may refer to:

== Film and TV ==
- Eat Your Heart Out (film)
- An episode of The Andy Griffith Show
- An episode of Fat Friends
- An episode of I Love Money
- An episode of The Real Housewives of Beverly Hills
- An episode of Total Divas

== Music ==
- Eat Your Heart Out (band)
- Eat Your Heart Out Records, founded by Alec Empire
- Eat Your Heart Out (album) by Potatohead People
- Eat Your Heart Out, an album by Klinik

=== Songs ===
- "Eat Your Heart Out" by Dio on The Last in Line
- "Eat Your Heart Out" by Hungry Kids of Hungary on Escapades
- "Eat Your Heart Out" by Kiss on Monster
- "Eat Your Heart Out" by Lydia on Paint It Golden
- "Eat Your Heart Out" by Molly Hatchet on Devil's Canyon
- "Eat Your Heart Out" by Outline In Color
- "Eat Your Heart Out" by Paul Hardcastle
- "Eat Your Heart Out" by Prima Donna on Kiss Kiss
- "Eat Your Heart Out" by Saint Motel on ForPlay
- "Eat Your Heart Out" by Walk the Moon
- "Eat Your Heart Out" by Xavion

== Other uses ==
- Eat Your Heart Out: Food Profiteering in America, a book by Jim Hightower
- A story by Richard Dean Starr
