= List of number-one singles of 2015 (Poland) =

This is a list of the songs that reached number-one position in official Polish single chart in ZPAV in 2015.

== Chart history ==
Issue Date	Song	Artist(s)	Reference(s)
January 3	"Chwile jak te"	Bednarek	
January 10	"Take Me to Church"	Hozier	
January 17	"Take Me to Church"	Hozier	
January 24	"Take Me to Church"	Hozier	
January 31	"Take Me to Church"	Hozier	
February 7	"Take Me to Church"	Hozier	
February 14	"Take Me to Church"	Hozier	
February 21	"Take Me to Church"	Hozier	
February 28	"Outside"	Calvin Harris feat. Ellie Goulding	
March 7	"Love Me like You Do"	Ellie Goulding	
March 14	"Love Me like You Do"	Ellie Goulding	
March 21	"Love Me like You Do"	Ellie Goulding	
March 28	"Love Me like You Do"	Ellie Goulding	
April 4	"Perdóname"	Deorro feat. DyCy & Adrian Delgado	
April 11	"Perdóname"	Deorro feat. DyCy & Adrian Delgado	
April 18	"Perdóname"	Deorro feat. DyCy & Adrian Delgado	
April 25	"Elastic Heart"	Sia	
May 2	"Are You with Me"	Lost Frequencies	
May 9	"Are You with Me"	Lost Frequencies	
May 16	"Are You with Me"	Lost Frequencies	
May 23	"Are You with Me"	Lost Frequencies	
May 30	"Cheerleader" (Felix Jaehn remix)	OMI	
June 6	"Firestone"	Kygo feat. Conrad Sewell	
June 13	"Firestone"	Kygo feat. Conrad Sewell	
June 20	"Naucz mnie"	Sarsa	
June 27	"Naucz mnie"	Sarsa	
July 4	"Naucz mnie"	Sarsa	
July 11	"Naucz mnie"	Sarsa	
July 18	"Naucz mnie"	Sarsa	
July 25	"Naucz mnie"	Sarsa	
August 1	"Shut Up and Dance"	Walk the Moon	
August 8	"Ghost Town"	Adam Lambert	
August 15	"Ain't Nobody (Loves Me Better)"	Felix Jaehn feat. Jasmine Thompson	
August 22	"Supergirl"	Anna Naklab feat. Alle Farben & YOUNOTUS	
August 29	"Supergirl"	Anna Naklab feat. Alle Farben & YOUNOTUS	
September 5	"Reality"	Lost Frequencies featuring Janieck Devy	
September 12	"Reality"	Lost Frequencies featuring Janieck Devy	
September 19	"El Perdón"	Nicky Jam feat. Enrique Iglesias	
September 26	"Reality"	Lost Frequencies feat. Janieck Devy	
October 3	"Reality"	Lost Frequencies feat. Janieck Devy	
October 10	"El mismo sol"	Álvaro Soler	
October 17	"Reality"	Lost Frequencies feat. Janieck Devy	
October 24	"Reality"	Lost Frequencies feat. Janieck Devy	
October 31	"Reality"	Lost Frequencies feat. Janieck Devy	
November 7	"Pomimo burz"	Antek Smykiewicz	
November 14	"Pomimo burz"	Antek Smykiewicz	
November 21	"Hello"	Adele	
November 28	"Locked Away"	R. City feat. Adam Levine	
December 5	"Hello"	Adele	
December 12	"Hello"	Adele	
December 19	"Don't Be So Shy" (Filatov & Karas remix)	Imany	
December 26	"Renegades"	X Ambassadors	

== Number-one artists ==
Position	Artist	Weeks at #1
1	Lost Frequencies	11
2	Hozier	7
2	Janieck Devy (as featuring)	7
3	Sarsa	6
4	Ellie Goulding (also as featuring)	5
5	Deorro	3
5	DyCy (as featuring)	3
5	Adrian Delgado (as featuring)	3
5	Adele	3
6	Kygo	2
6	Conrad Sewell (as featuring)	2
6	Anna Naklab	2
6	Alle Farben (as featuring)	2
6	Younotus (as featuring)	2
6	Antek Smykiewicz	2
8	Bednarek	1
8	Calvin Harris	1
8	Sia	1
8	OMI	1
8	Walk the Moon	1
8	Adam Lambert	1
8	Felix Jaehn	1
8	Jasmine Thompson (as featuring)	1
8	Nicky Jam	1
8	Enrique Iglesias (as featuring)	1
8	Álvaro Soler	1
8	R. City	1
8	Adam Levine (as featuring)	1
8	Imany	1
8	X Ambassadors	1

== See also ==
- Polish Music Charts
