= Can You Handle My Love?? =

2021 single by Walk the Moon

Single by Walk the Moon

from the album Heights
- B-side: "Giants"; "I'm Good"
- Released: July 14, 2021
- Length: 4:16
- Label: RCA
- Songwriters: Nicholas Petricca; Eli Maiman; Sean Waugaman; Thomas Schleiter; Kristine Flaherty
- Producers: Mike Crossey; Tommy English

Walk the Moon singles chronology
"Timebomb" (2019)	"Can You Handle My Love??" (2021)	"Fire In Your House" (2021)

Music video
- "Can You Handle My Love???" on YouTube

"Can You Handle My Love??" is a song by American rock band Walk the Moon. It was released on July 14, 2021, as the lead single from their fifth studio album, Heights (2021). This is their first single not to feature bassist Kevin Ray, who parted ways with the band in December 2020.

== Composition ==
"Can You Handle My Love??" was written by Nicholas Petricca, Eli Maiman, Sean Waugaman, Tommy English and K.Flay. The track's production was handled by English along with record producer Mike Crossey.

== Music video ==
The music video for "Can You Handle My Love??" was released alongside the single on Walk the Moon's YouTube channel at noon eastern time.

== Live performances ==
"Can You Handle My Love??" was first performed live on Late Night with Seth Meyers.

== Track listing ==
Digital single
No.	Title	Length
1.	"Can You Handle My Love??"	4:16
2.	"Giants"	3:41
3.	"I'm Good"	4:35
Total length:		12:32

== Credits and personnel ==
Credits adapted from Tidal.

Walk the Moon

- Nicholas Petricca – vocals, programming, songwriting, keyboard, bass
- Eli Maiman – guitar, backing vocals, songwriting
- Sean Waugaman – drums, percussion, backing vocals, songwriting

Additional personnel

- K.Flay – additional vocals, songwriting
- Tommy English – producer, songwriting
- Mike Crossey – producer
- Carter Jahn – engineer
- Stephen Sesso – engineer
- Neal Avron – mixing engineer
- Scott Skrzynski – assistant engineer

== Charts ==
Weekly chart performance for "Can You Handle My Love??"
Chart (2021)	Peak position
US Rock & Alternative Airplay (Billboard)	15

== Release history ==
Release dates and formats for "Can You Handle My Love??"
Region	Date	Format	Label(s)	Ref.
Various	July 14, 2021	Digital download; streaming	RCA; Sony	
United States	July 20, 2021	Alternative radio	RCA; Sony	
