= Work This Body =

2016 single by Walk the Moon

Single by Walk the Moon

from the album Talking Is Hard
- Released: February 23, 2016
- Recorded: Rancho Pagzilla (North Hollywood, California)
- Genre: Pop
- Length: 2:55
- Label: RCA
- Songwriters: Eli Maiman; Nicholas Petricca; Kevin Ray; John Ryan; Sean Waugaman
- Producer: Tim Pagnotta

Walk the Moon singles chronology
"Different Colors" (2015)	"Work This Body" (2016)	"Back 2 U" (2016)

Music video
- "Work This Body" on YouTube

"Work This Body" is a song by American rock band Walk the Moon for their third studio album, Talking Is Hard (2014). It was written by all four members of the band and John Ryan. The song was sent to US alternative radio stations by RCA Records as the album's third single on February 23, 2016. A pop song with Latin American influence and a worldbeat element, its lyrics are about getting in shape and motivating one's self to go after their dreams without succumbing to their fears.

"Work This Body" was met with mostly positive reviews from music critics, receiving praise for its movable groove and hook. Following the song's release, it reached number 34 on the Billboard Alternative Songs chart. The song's music video, directed by the band and Isaac Rentz, was released on February 12, 2016. It portrays a kid who starts a food fight during a school talent show while the band performs the song dressed as superheroes surrounded in 1980s video game imagery. The song was included on Walk the Moon's setlist for the Talking Is Hard Tour (2015) and performed live at events such as Dick Clark's New Year's Rockin' Eve and the NBA All-Star Weekend's Slam Dunk Contest.

== Background and composition ==
"Work This Body" was written by all four members of Walk the Moon with John Ryan and recorded at Rancho Pagzilla in North Hollywood, California. The band's drummer Sean Waugaman utilized fifteen different percussion instruments in the song. Frontman Nicholas Petricca recounted how the live room after the song's recording was "completely trashed with every percussion instrument that [he could] think of", which included timbales and shakers, explaining its worldbeat element. Additionally, Petricca cited the guitar solo featured in Jimmy Eat World's "The Middle" as the inspiration for the one found in "Work This Body". It was produced by Tim Pagnotta and mixed by Neal Avron at The Casita in Hollywood, California. Mastering was done by Joe LaPorta at Sterling Sound, New York City. The song's single cover was designed by Jason Matheny, who worked on the band's cover designs for the Talking Is Hard album and the Different Colors EP.

"Work This Body"
A 17-second sample of the chorus to "Work This Body", a pop song that employs a worldbeat element through its heavy use of percussion.

According to the song's sheet music published by Sony/ATV Music Publishing, "Work This Body" is composed in 4/4 time and the key of E major at an "upbeat and peppy" tempo of 134 beats per minute. The song has a melody that spans a tonal range of B_{2} to B_{4}. It has been described as a pop song with a "vaguely Caribbean lilt" and was compared to the works of Bleachers, Fun, Steel Train, Vampire Weekend, and Animal Collective. Jade Wright of the Liverpool Echo wrote that the beginning of the track sounds "very much" like "A Little Respect" by Erasure. Petricca told Billboard Argentina that "Work This Body" has a lot of Latin American influence and described its rhythm and percussion as having "a very Zamba vibe". Bassist Kevin Ray said that the track has a "special dynamic" with "a bit of [a] world music rhythm". Anthony Soredino, writing for AbsolutePunk, described Maiman's solo in the song as him "channel[ing] his inner Jack Antonoff".

Lyrically, the song's chorus encourages one to work their own body until they beat everyone else fair and square, with Ray commenting on how its title could be interpreted as "a direct invitation to exercise". Petricca stated that "Work This Body" is a song about "getting [his] ass in shape and standing up to [his] fears". He explained in an interview with The Irish Times that its message is connected with "being unafraid [of] chas[ing] your dreams and go[ing] after what you really want". Petricca added that the song acts like "the soundtrack to [the band] trying to beat" their global hit "Shut Up and Dance". Guitarist Eli Maiman said that the song also deals with one "going beyond [their] perceived limitations" and utilizing "maybe jealousy or feelings of someone else getting something that [they] want to motivate [them] rather than letting it get [themselves] down". Certain lines throughout "Work This Body" are sung in French, consisting of: "Que ferais-tu? Putain, je ne sais pas! Ne viens pas pleurer vers moi."

== Release and reception ==
"Work This Body" was released as the eighth track of Walk the Moon's second major-label studio album Talking Is Hard. The band premiered the song's single edit (later labeled Le Mix Nouveau) on their Vevo channel on January 19, 2016. A live version of "Work This Body" was made available as a digital download and as an instant gratification track for pre-orders of Walk the Moon's first live album You Are Not Alone (Live at the Greek) on February 19, 2016. The song impacted US alternative radio stations on February 23, 2016, through RCA Records as the third and final single from Talking Is Hard.

"Work This Body" received mostly positive reviews from music critics. James Christopher Monger of AllMusic highlighted "Work This Body" as a track pick from the Talking Is Hard album. Kenneth Patridge of Billboard magazine wrote that the band "certainly knows how to start a party" with "Work This Body" and says that the song "lives up to its title [by] hit[ting] listeners with a groove that forces them to shut up and dance". The staff of BigFM referred to it as "a real summer hit" that "not only ensure[s] a good mood, but also uncontrolled wiggling and fidgeting of all limbs". SFGate's Kimberly Chun commended the song's hook for being "frenetic yet effortless-sounding". Anthony Sorendino of AbsolutePunk called the track "fun" and "bouncy" and that it "will probably end up in a Biggest Loser or Planet Fitness commercial". Chris DeVille of Stereogum said that "it's pretty wild to hear" a song like "Work This Body" "become top-40 pop", which he characterized as "late-aughts blog fodder". The Village Voice's Jill Menze said that "Work This Body" is "a tune that hopped on the Vampire Weekend revival train a few years too late".

== Commercial performance ==
After its release to alternative radio, "Work This Body" debuted at number 37 on the US Billboard Alternative Songs chart on the week ending March 26, 2016. On its final week on the chart, the song peaked at number 34 in the issue dated April 16, 2016, making it Walk the Moon's lowest charting placement there. The song logged a total of four weeks on the Alternative Songs chart. "Work This Body" was the band's first single to not chart on either the US Hot Rock Songs chart or the Rock Airplay chart. It experienced some minor success in the United Kingdom, reaching number 100 on the UK Singles Downloads Chart and number 87 in Scotland on the chart dated April 14, 2016. The song charted for only one week on both charts.

== Music video ==
The music video for "Work This Body" was shot by Andre Lascaris in Los Angeles, California. It was co-directed by the band with Isaac Rentz and produced by production company More Media. According to music and tour photographer Anna Lee, the video's creative process and back-end production took over 12 hours to complete. Multiple short videos showing each member of Walk the Moon donning their outfits were posted to the band's social media accounts a day prior to the video's release. Petricca mentioned how the video is "a little nudge to the skeptic that there really are superheroes among us". Maiman added that the song's meaning translates to the video as "th[e] kid using superheroes as inspiration to stand up to bullies". The clip premiered exclusively on Entertainment Weekly's website on February 12, 2016.

The video shows a boy at a school's talent show (dressed up as Petricca) who "ditches staples like dancing or magic tricks" and instead "starts a revolution with a lunchbox" by initiating a massive food fight among his classmates in the cafeteria. The kid ends up winning the talent show and earns the admiration of his school by the end of the video. Meanwhile, the band "rocks some retro superhero duds" while performing the song "against an '80s CGI background". MTV's Sasha Green described that the video "is full of retro flair". Regarding the video's imagery throughout Walk the Moon's performance, Green wrote that the band looked as if they were "stomping around on the set of Tron or inside an Asteroids arcade game", while Capital FM said it takes place "in some sort of 80s video game utopia".

== Live performances and use in other media ==
"Work This Body" was included on the setlist of Walk the Moon's Talking Is Hard Tour (2015). The band was also set to embark on a Work This Body Tour in 2016, but it ultimately got canceled due to Petricca having to tend to his father, who was suffering from early-onset Alzheimer's disease. The song was performed as part of a 12-song set at the Austin City Limits Music Festival on October 3, 2015. A video of Walk the Moon performing "Work This Body" live on the Honda Stage was uploaded to their Vevo account on November 17, 2015. It was later played at Dick Clark's New Year's Rockin' Eve on December 31, 2015. On Saturday, February 13, 2016, the band performed the song with "Shut Up and Dance" at the NBA All-Star Weekend's Slam Dunk Contest. They performed "Work This Body" on Late Night with Seth Meyers on May 11, 2016.

In 2016, Billboard partnered with Zumba to create a fitness routine playlist of 15 pop songs to work out to, which included "Work This Body". That same year, Walk the Moon teamed up with Zumba to create a choreography video for the song, starring "two dancers at a roller rink who wear fluorescent, 1980s-style Zumba workout gear". Billboard's Colin Stutz wrote that the video showcases them "grooving to the catchy tune, encouraging fans to get moving and try it for themselves at their next Zumba class or at home". The band's manager Michael McDonald said that none of the four members have ever taken a Zumba class and "didn't consider appearing in the video"; instead, "they just wanted to tap into Zumba's devoted following".

== Track listing ==
- Digital download
1. "Work This Body" – 2:57
- Digital download – Live
1. "Work This Body" (Live) – 4:08

== Credits and personnel ==
Credits adapted from the liner notes of Talking Is Hard.

Locations

- Recorded at Rancho Pagzilla, North Hollywood, California
- Mixed at The Casita, Hollywood, California
- Mastered at Sterling Sound, New York City

Personnel

- Nick Petricca – vocals, keyboards, percussion, programming, songwriting
- Kevin Ray – bass, vocals, songwriting
- Sean Waugaman – percussion, vocals, songwriting
- Eli Maiman – guitar, vocals, programming, songwriting
- John Ryan – songwriting
- Ben Berger – vocal production
- Ryan McMahon – vocal production
- Jarett Holmes – programming, recording, digital editing
- Tim Pagnotta – production, recording
- Brian Phillips – digital editing
- Allen Casillas – digital editing
- Ryan Gillmore – digital editing
- Mauro Rubbi – drum technician
- Blake Mares – assistant engineer
- Robert Cohen – assistant engineer
- Neal Avron – mixing
- Scott Skrzynski – mixing assistant
- Joe LaPorta – mastering

== Charts ==
=== Weekly charts ===
Weekly chart performance for "Work This Body"
Chart (2016)	Peak position
Scottish Singles Sales (Official Charts)	87
UK Singles Downloads (Official Charts)	100
US Alternative Airplay (Billboard)	34

== Certifications ==
Certifications for "Work This Body"
Region	Certification	Certified units/sales
United States (RIAA)	Gold	500,000^{‡}
^{‡} Sales+streaming figures based on certification alone.

== Release history ==
Release dates and formats for "Work This Body"
Region	Date	Format	Version	Label(s)	Ref.
Various	February 19, 2016	Digital download	Live	RCA; Sony	
United States	February 23, 2016	Alternative radio	Original	RCA; Sony	
