= One Foot (Walk the Moon song) =

Single by Walk the Moon

from the album What If Nothing
- Released: September 22, 2017
- Studio: The Ranch (Woodland Hills, California)
- Genre: New wave
- Length: 4:21
- Label: RCA
- Songwriters: Ben Berger; Eli Maiman; Ryan McMahon; Nicholas Petricca; Ryan Rabin; Kevin Ray; Sean Waugaman
- Producers: Mike Crossey; Captain Cuts

Walk the Moon singles chronology
"Back 2 U" (2016)	"One Foot" (2017)	"Kamikaze" (2018)

Music video
- "One Foot" on YouTube

"One Foot" is a song by American rock band Walk the Moon from their fourth studio album, What If Nothing (2017). It was written by the band members and songwriters Ben Berger, Ryan McMahon, and Ryan Rabin; the latter three also produced the track with Mike Crossey. The song was released as the album's lead single through RCA Records on September 22, 2017.

"One Foot" received positive reviews from music critics, who complimented its catchiness and production, and peaked at number one on the Billboard Alternative Songs chart for four consecutive weeks, becoming the band's second song to top the chart after their biggest hit "Shut Up and Dance" in 2015. It was also Walk the Moon's second chart entry on the Billboard Hot 100, reaching number 65. The song was included on the setlist of the band's Press Restart Tour (2017−18) and performed on Jimmy Kimmel Live! and The Tonight Show Starring Jimmy Fallon.

== Background and release ==
"One Foot" was written by band members Nicholas Petricca, Kevin Ray, Eli Maiman, and Sean Waugaman and songwriters Ben Berger, Ryan McMahon, and Ryan Rabin. The latter three also co-produced it under the name Captain Cuts with Mike Crossey. It was recorded at The Ranch Studios by Jonathan Gilmore and Joseph Rogers and mixed by Neal Avron at The Casita with assistance from Scott Skrzynski.

Guitarist Eli Maiman stated the song is "indicative of the album's 'bigger, epic sound'", while lead singer Nicholas Petricca said: "'One Foot' is facing the void. The last record, we felt like we had a lot of answers. This time, we have a bunch of questions." In an interview with Entertainment Weekly, Petricca recalled the band's return to making music in Austin, Texas, mentioning how "it was just the four of [them] in a room for the first time" since their last tour. He also expressed the large fear that loomed over the band when recording "One Foot", saying "the outside world was reflecting like, 'What the f— is going to happen?'", after the presidential election of Donald Trump.

On August 24, 2017, Billboard reported on the upcoming release of "One Foot" along with the announcement of the band's third studio album What If Nothing. The song was released digitally as the album's lead single through RCA Records on September 22 of that year. It subsequently impacted US alternative radio on September 26, 2017, and US contemporary hit radio on November 14, 2017. Two remixes of the song created by Captain Cuts and White Panda were later released on January 12, 2018.

== Composition and lyrics ==
According to the song's sheet music published at Musicnotes.com by Alfred Publishing, "One Foot" is composed in 4/4 time and the key of C major with a moderate tempo of 100 beats per minute. Petricca is described vocally as performing the song in a strident manner. "One Foot" is described an upbeat new wave song by music journalists, incorporating a funk-inspired beat set to a slinky rhythm. Its chorus resembles that of a tribal chant and mixes a disco-like groove. Billboard said the song "encourages the same ecstatic abandon as 'Shut Up and Dance' but, unlike its '80s-worshipping predecessor, follows EDM logic with a gravity-defying beat drop and reverberating vocals".

The song tells "a story of exploring uncharted territory, and the test of trust on a relationship in uncertain circumstances", with lyrics such as “I'm your king of nothing at all/ And you're my queen of nothing at all/ Well, out here in the dust if you don't have trust/ Ain't nothing left of us, this is the exodus/ They're just testing us, they can’t flex with us." The chorus consists of a repeated call-to-action: "Oh, one foot in front of the other." The song's lyrics also urge listeners to "take things one step at a time" while pointing a finger at the United States, with the band calling it "the so-called Land of the Free" in the final refrain of the chorus.

Petricca described it as "the soundtrack of [the band's] journey th[e] past year, moving forward even when the path is uncertain". He also noted that the song sums up the theme of What If Nothing about "[s]taring out into the unknown, being faced with uncertainty and what could be certain failure, but deciding to move forward and take that first step anyway". Time's Raisa Bruner wrote that while the song is "bright on the surface, [it] is underlaid by a darker lyrical honesty".

== Critical reception ==
"One Foot" received generally positive reviews. Raisa Bruner of Time magazine described the song as "an upbeat rock singalong" that "has the same tendency towards instantaneous catchiness". Allison Stubblebine, writing for Billboard magazine, called it "the perfect distillation of the band's signature foot-stomping sound". Writing for Stereogum, Chris DeVille called "One Foot" a "[r]equisite '80s throwback" that "boasts some of those iridescent melodic squeals that have become a pop staple post-Purpose". Allan Raible of ABC News was critical towards the song, labeling it as "a painfully forced anthem".

== Commercial performance ==
The song debuted on the Billboard Hot 100 at number 80 in the issue dated January 10, 2018, becoming the band's second entry on the chart after "Shut Up and Dance" peaked at number four in 2015. It later peaked at number 65 on the week ending February 16, 2018, and spent eight total weeks on the chart. In the issue dated January 25, 2018, "One Foot" reached number one on the Alternative Songs chart, earning the band their second leader on the chart following the four-week reign of "Shut Up and Dance" in 2015. It concurrently reached its peak on the Adult Top 40 and Mainstream Top 40 charts at numbers 12 and 22, respectively. The song would remain at the top of the Alternative Songs chart for four consecutive weeks.

== Music video ==
The official music video was released on September 22, 2017 on Walk the Moon's Vevo channel.

The video for "One Foot" was shot in Joshua Tree National Park and, according to a press release, it was "methodically planned to coincide exactly with the Great American eclipse of 2017" (though not in the path of totality). The clip was shot with specialized lenses modeled after the glasses people all over the country wore to view the eclipse. Robert Hales (Nine Inch Nails, Imagine Dragons) directed the video, and the visual effects were executed by creative director, Felipe Posada (The Invisible Realm).

== Live performances ==
On December 11, 2017, Walk the Moon performed "One Foot" along with "Kamikaze" on Jimmy Kimmel Live! for Kimmel's Mercedes-Benz concert series. In the performance, Petricca had his mullet bleached blond and wore a knee-length cardigan with eyes printed all over. Petricca also had white face paint streaming out from the corner of his eyes, which had been a staple of the group's aesthetic. It was performed again as part of Kimmel's Mercedes-Benz concert series exclusively off-air on March 13, 2019. Walk the Moon also performed the song on The Tonight Show Starring Jimmy Fallon on January 15, 2018. The song was included on the set list of the band's 2017−18 Press Restart Tour. On September 20, 2019, Cirque du Soleil joined Walk the Moon onstage during their performance of "One Foot" at the seventh annual Life Is Beautiful Music & Art Festival.

== Track listing ==
Digital download
No.	Title	Length
1.	"One Foot"	4:21

Digital download – The Captain Cuts Remix
No.	Title	Length
1.	"One Foot" (The Captain Cuts Remix)	4:07

Digital download – The White Panda Remix
No.	Title	Length
1.	"One Foot" (The White Panda Remix)	3:51

== Credits and personnel ==
Credits adapted from Tidal and the liner notes of What If Nothing.

=== Recording ===
- Recorded at The Ranch Studios (Woodland Hills, California)
- Mixed at The Casita (Hollywood, California)

=== Personnel ===
- Nicholas Petricca – vocals, keyboards, songwriting
- Kevin Ray – bass, songwriting
- Eli Maiman – guitar, songwriting
- Sean Waugaman – drums, songwriting
- Mike Crossey – production
- Benjamin Berger – songwriting, co-production
- Ryan McMahon – songwriting, co-production
- Ryan Rabin – songwriting, co-production
- Scott Skrzynski – mixing assistant
- Neal Avron – mixing
- Jonathan Gilmore – recording
- Joseph Rogers – recording

== Charts and certifications ==
=== Weekly charts ===
Chart (2017–2018)	Peak position
Canada AC (Billboard)	27
Canada CHR/Top 40 (Billboard)	42
Canada Hot AC (Billboard)	19
Canada Rock (Billboard)	42
Sweden Heatseeker (Sverigetopplistan)	16
US Billboard Hot 100	65
US Adult Contemporary (Billboard)	27
US Adult Pop Airplay (Billboard)	12
US Alternative Airplay (Billboard)	1
US Hot Rock & Alternative Songs (Billboard)	4
US Pop Airplay (Billboard)	22
US Rock & Alternative Airplay (Billboard)	2

=== Year-end charts ===
Chart (2018)	Position
US Adult Top 40 (Billboard)	34
US Alternative Songs (Billboard)	5
US Hot Rock Songs (Billboard)	13
US Rock Airplay (Billboard)	11

=== Certifications ===
Region	Certification	Certified units/sales
United States (RIAA)	Platinum	1,000,000^{‡}
^{‡} Sales+streaming figures based on certification alone.

== Release history ==
Region	Date	Format	Version	Label	Ref.
Various	September 22, 2017	Digital download; streaming	Original	RCA; Sony	
United States	September 26, 2017	Alternative radio	Original	RCA; Sony	
United States	November 14, 2017	Contemporary hit radio	Original	RCA; Sony	
Various	January 12, 2018	Digital download; streaming	The Captain Cuts Remix	RCA; Sony	
Various	January 12, 2018	Digital download; streaming	The White Panda Remix	RCA; Sony	
