= Talking Is Hard =

Studio album by Walk the Moon
- Released: December 2, 2014
- Studio: Rancho Pagzilla (North Hollywood, California)
- Genre: Indie pop; new wave; pop
- Length: 43:11
- Label: RCA
- Producer: Tim Pagnotta

Walk the Moon chronology
Walk the Moon (2012)	Talking Is Hard (2014)	What If Nothing (2017)

Singles from Talking Is Hard
- 1. "Shut Up and Dance" Released: September 10, 2014; 2. "Different Colors" Released: May 5, 2015; 3. "Work This Body" Released: February 23, 2016

Talking Is Hard is the third studio album by American rock band Walk the Moon, released on December 2, 2014, by RCA Records. The band chose to work with Tim Pagnotta to produce an album that would explore different influences and sounds to differentiate it from their self-titled major label debut (2012). Described as an indie pop, new wave and pop record, the album takes inspiration from multiple artists of the 1980s.

Three singles were released from Talking Is Hard, with the lead single "Shut Up and Dance" becoming Walk the Moon's biggest hit in the United States, peaking at number four on the Billboard Hot 100. It was also an international hit for the band, reaching the top ten in multiple countries. The album is Walk the Moon's most commercially successful record to date, peaking at number 14 on the Billboard 200 and receiving a platinum certification from the Recording Industry Association of America (RIAA).

== Background ==
Around the time of the Tightrope EP's release in 2013, Walk the Moon had already begun working in the early stages of their next studio album. Lead singer Nicholas Petricca stated to Billboard that the band had "a bag of songs that are in different degrees of completion" and were looking "to go in the studio sometime in the spring and get started". While they were still considering producers at this time, Mark Needham, who had previously produced the band's self-titled album (2012) and the Tightrope EP, was mentioned as an early favorite. The band took a long-anticipated break from touring soon after.

The majority of the album was written in June 2013 in a building located in northern Kentucky that used to be an old Masonic lodge, dubbed the Mason Jar by the band. They wrote about 50 songs for the record, which later got cut down to 14 before settling with the 12 tracks that made it onto the final track list. The band then flew to North Hollywood, Los Angeles to record their songs at Rancho Pagzilla. The album's drum tracking was completed over a span of ten days. Drummer Sean Waugaman primarily used a 1965 Ludwig black oyster pearl drum kit with Paiste 602s, Signatures, and Zildjian Constantinople cymbals. The band members ended up choosing Sugarcult frontman Tim Pagnotta to produce Talking Is Hard. Guitarist Eli Maiman spoke with Alternative Addiction about their experience working with Pagnotta, saying that he "very quickly became part of [their] family" and "made the whole process easy and fun" due to how natural the fit was. Maiman also said that the band "weren't afraid to explore different influences and different sounds" to stray away from making their previous record again.

The album cover for Talking Is Hard features a photograph of the band members taken by Shervin Lainez. During the photo shoot, the band was having fun improvising with the photographer to explore a new look for them "that was not all wild colors and tank tops and Peter Pan". Maiman stated that the final cover used was "just supposed to be a promotional shot" and that the band had "a whole other cover planned that didn't have [them] on it at all". Regarding the album's title, Petricca said to Fuse that "[t]alking is the way that [everyone] communicate[s] everyday, all day, to each other, but words just don't fully convey everything that you have inside," which is "why [they] have music" to express "[a]ll those thoughts and feelings". He also mentioned how "[p]eople of [their] generation are scared to express [them]selves" since they are "stuck on [their] phones communicating with people on the other side of the world, but find it hard to hold a conversation with people across the table".

== Music and lyrics ==
Talking Is Hard has been described as an indie pop, new wave and pop record, incorporating sounds present in 1980s music. Petricca told Rolling Stone that the band pulled from a multitude of different eras, especially from "stuff that has a hint of weird". He cited Talking Heads, Prince and David Bowie as influences for the album, artists who he said were "unafraid of being kooky". Bassist Kevin Ray said that the album "ended up exploring a lot of heavier topics", which include songs "about interpersonal relationships and [the band's] relationship with the planet and bigger-scale things".

The album opens with "Different Colors", a song that celebrates and embraces each other's differences and "speaks out against discrimination of all kinds". "Sidekick", the album's second track, is made up of bubbly synthesizers and funky disco vibes. Petricca said that it "has a lot of elements [that] tie [the band] to where [they] came from" with "semi-embarrassing, true story lyrics" and "some of [his] favorite bass stuff on the whole record". Petricca called "Shut Up and Dance" a 'dork rock' anthem and stated that it was inspired by songs like "Hit Me with Your Best Shot" (Pat Benatar) and "Jessie's Girl" (Rick Springfield), which he referred to as "real heart-on-your-sleeve kind of anthems". The following track, "Up 2 U", is an effects-heavy shredder that was described by Petricca as "really ferocious" and "a lot heavier than anything" they have ever done. The song "Avalanche" is said to be about both "a story [of] a Midwest kid looking beyond and seeing what is out there and dreaming big" and the "moment of seeing someone and getting that jolt of 'know[ing] them somehow, but never me[eting] them'". "Portugal" is "a synth-driven, slower song" that Maiman had "the heaviest hand in" and is the only song on the album to not "have a single guitar part". Petricca explained in a Spotify track by track commentary that it serves as a reminder that the people who he loved and have left "are still close" and a "part of [him] and [his] life".

Opening the second half of the album, "Down in the Dumps" is a song about getting out of a negativity cycle and "sucking it up". The eighth track, "Work This Body", employs a worldbeat element with a lot of Latin American-influence; the rhythm and percussion is said to have "a very Zamba vibe". Lyrically, the song is about "being unafraid [of] chas[ing] your dreams and go[ing] after what you really want". "Spend Your $$$" is a buoyant pop march that has Petricca switching between his normal voice and a soaring falsetto. The song's chorus came from a statement Waugaman made, declaring that "no one would rob him because he's got 'nothing of value,'" in a very David Byrne-esque manner. "We Are the Kids" is a slick, R&B-infused anthem about survival that takes a darker vibe, inspired by Michael Jackson and Tears for Fears. The album's final moments were described as "reveal[ing] a more understated side of Walk the Moon". "Come Under the Covers", the penultimate track, is a power pop song that started off as a guitar riff that Maiman played for a soundcheck in Austria. As the band immediately began playing along to it, Petricca took out his phone to record the song. The album's final track, "Aquaman", is soundwise "a modern homage to the '80s".

== Release and promotion ==
On October 30, 2014, Radio.com reported on the announcement of Walk the Moon's upcoming album Talking Is Hard, along with its release date. Pre-orders for the album were made available through the band's online store. The band revealed the track list for Talking Is Hard on their Facebook page, along with individual artwork for each of the songs, on November 10, 2014. The album was made available for pre-order on iTunes and Amazon on November 17, 2014. A week before the album's release, handwritten lyrics for each track were revealed over a three-day period on MetroLyrics. On December 2, 2014, Talking Is Hard was released in the United States through RCA Records. Walk the Moon embarked on a Talking Is Hard Tour in 2015 to promote the album. They performed the album's lead single, "Shut Up and Dance", on The Tonight Show Starring Jimmy Fallon, The Ellen DeGeneres Show, and Jimmy Kimmel Live. An expanded edition of the album was released in the United Kingdom on June 15, 2015, and in Japan on August 12, 2015.

=== Singles ===
"Shut Up and Dance" was released to digital retailers on September 10, 2014, as the album's lead single. It was a commercial success, peaking at number four on the US Billboard Hot 100 and spending four consecutive weeks at number one on the Alternative Songs airplay chart. The song also broke the record at the time for the most weeks at number one on the Hot Rock Songs chart, remaining at the top position for 27 consecutive weeks. The opening track "Different Colors" was sent to US alternative radio stations to serve as the second single on May 5, 2015. The song was Walk the Moon's second consecutive top ten hit on the Alternative Songs chart, reaching number seven. The third and final single, "Work This Body", impacted US alternative radio stations on February 23, 2016. Unlike the two singles that preceded it, the song experienced relatively minor success on the Alternative Songs chart, peaking at number 34.

== Critical reception ==
Professional ratings
Review scores
Source	Rating
AbsolutePunk	8.0/10
AllMusic	3.5/5 stars
Alternative Addiction	3.5/5 stars

Anthony Sorendino, writing for AbsolutePunk, saw Talking Is Hard as an improvement over the band's self-titled album in every way, saying that many of the tracks on it "blow the best songs from Walk the Moon out of the water" and that it "is a step closer to Walk the Moon's full potential". James Christopher Monger of AllMusic reviewed the album positively, describing it as "a 12-track slab of twisty, pulsating, yet always melodious Phoenix-, Jukebox the Ghost-, Bleachers-, and Foster the People-inspired indie pop that's as clever as it is tooth-decay inducing". He went on to say that "it's easy to forgive [the band] their trespasses" since they "are good enough at what they do and deliver their product with such confidence and verve". In another positive review, the staff of Alternative Addiction wrote that one "can listen to it a hundred times and hear something new to appreciate each time through", despite thinking the album was "not as good as the last record". Talking Is Hard was later included on Alternative Addiction's "Top 20 Albums of 2014" list at number 12. VH1's Ali Read included it as one of her picks of the best albums released in 2014, mentioning how the album's "combination of instrumental techniques and the catchy nature of the songs" led to "a great final product". In a more mixed review, Mitchell Bozzetto of Renowned for Sound thought that the album is "a step backwards rather than forwards", saying that it "lacks the excitement and energy" heard on Walk the Moon and finding a majority of the songs "borderline cheesy".

== Commercial performance ==
Talking Is Hard debuted at number 26 on the US Billboard 200 on the week of December 20, 2014, becoming Walk the Moon's highest debut on the chart and besting the chart position of the band's previous album Walk the Moon, which entered and peaked at number 36. The album eventually peaked at number 14 in the issue dated May 15, 2015, and spent a total of 58 weeks on the chart, making it Walk the Moon's most commercially successful record to date in the United States. Additionally, Talking Is Hard topped the Top Alternative Albums chart and reached number 3 and 10 on the Top Rock Albums chart and the Top Tastemaker Albums chart, respectively. It was awarded a gold certification by the Recording Industry Association of America (RIAA) in 2016 for sales of over 500,000 units and later a platinum certification in 2018 for sales of over 1,000,000 units.

Outside the United States, Talking Is Hard gained moderate success in several other countries. It charted for one week on the Canadian Albums Chart at number 31 on the week ending December 4, 2015, and earned a gold certification from Music Canada (MC) in 2017 for exceeding 40,000 units in sales. Talking Is Hard also charted in Australia and France at numbers 85 and 126, respectively. Following the release of the album's expanded edition, it debuted at number 53 in the United Kingdom, number 37 in Scotland and number 148 in Japan.

== Track listing ==
Talking Is Hard – Standard edition
No.	Title	Writer(s)	Producer	Length
1.	"Different Colors"	Nicholas Petricca; Kevin Ray; Sean Waugaman; Eli Maiman	Tim Pagnotta	3:42
2.	"Sidekick"	Petricca; Ray; Waugaman; Maiman	Pagnotta	2:55
3.	"Shut Up and Dance"	Petricca; Ray; Waugaman; Maiman; Ben Berger; Ryan McMahon	Pagnotta	3:19
4.	"Up 2 U"	Petricca; Ray; Waugaman; Maiman; Berger; McMahon	Pagnotta	3:23
5.	"Avalanche"	Petricca; Ray; Waugaman; Maiman; Pagnotta	Pagnotta	3:40
6.	"Portugal"	Petricca; Ray; Waugaman; Maiman	Pagnotta	4:01
7.	"Down in the Dumps"	Petricca; Ray; Waugaman; Maiman	Pagnotta	4:25
8.	"Work This Body"	Petricca; Ray; Waugaman; Maiman; John Ryan	Pagnotta	2:57
9.	"Spend Your $$$"	Petricca; Ray; Waugaman; Maiman	Pagnotta	3:22
10.	"We Are the Kids"	Petricca; Ray; Waugaman; Maiman; Ryan	Pagnotta	3:37
11.	"Come Under the Covers"	Petricca; Ray; Waugaman; Maiman	Pagnotta	3:51
12.	"Aquaman"	Petricca; Ray; Waugaman; Maiman; Matt Radosevich	Pagnotta	3:59
Total length:				43:11

Talking Is Hard – Expanded edition (bonus tracks)
No.	Title	Writer(s)	Producer	Length
13.	"Boyfriend"	Petricca; Ray; Waugaman; Maiman; Blake O'Brien	Pagnotta	2:58
14.	"This Must Be the Place (Naive Melody)" (Live at Sirius XM)	David Byrne; Chris Frantz; Jerry Harrison; Tina Weymouth		3:53
15.	"Shut Up and Dance" (Live at Sirius XM)	Petricca; Ray; Waugaman; Maiman; Berger; McMahon		3:15
Total length:				53:12

Talking Is Hard – Deluxe Google Play edition (bonus tracks)
No.	Title	Writer(s)	Length
13.	"Shut Up and Dance" (Acoustic)	Petricca; Ray; Waugaman; Maiman; Berger; McMahon	3:14
14.	"Different Colors" (Acoustic)	Petricca; Ray; Waugaman; Maiman	3:24
Total length:			49:57

== Personnel ==
Credits adapted from the liner notes of Talking Is Hard.

Locations

- Recorded at Rancho Pagzilla, North Hollywood, California
- Mixed at The Casita, Hollywood, California
- Mastered at Sterling Sound, New York City

Personnel

- Nick Petricca – vocals, keyboards, percussion, programming, songwriting
- Kevin Ray – bass, vocals, songwriting
- Sean Waugaman – percussion, vocals, songwriting
- Eli Maiman – guitar, vocals, programming, songwriting
- Ben Berger – songwriting, vocal production, co-production
- Ryan McMahon – songwriting, vocal production, co-production
- Jarett Holmes – programming, recording, digital editing
- Tim Pagnotta – production, recording
- Brian Phillips – digital editing
- Allen Casillas – digital editing
- Ryan Gillmor – digital editing
- Mauro Rubbi – drum technician
- Andrew "Muffman" Luftman – recording assistant
- Kuk Harrell – vocal recording
- Marcos Tovar – vocal recording
- Blake Mares – assistant engineer
- Robert Cohen – assistant engineer
- Neal Avron – mixing
- Scott Skrzynski – mixing assistant
- Joe LaPorta – mastering

== Charts ==
=== Weekly charts ===
Weekly chart performance for Talking Is Hard
Chart (2014–2015)	Peak position
Australian Albums (ARIA)	85
Canadian Albums (Billboard)	31
French Albums (SNEP)	126
Japanese Albums (Oricon)	148
Scottish Albums (OCC)	37
UK Albums (OCC)	53
US Billboard 200	14
US Indie Store Album Sales (Billboard)	10
US Top Alternative Albums (Billboard)	1
US Top Rock Albums (Billboard)	3

=== Year-end charts ===
Year-end chart performance for Talking Is Hard
Chart (2015)	Position
US Billboard 200	32
US Top Alternative Albums (Billboard)	12
US Top Rock Albums (Billboard)	16

== Certifications ==
Certifications for Talking Is Hard
Region	Certification	Certified units/sales
Canada (Music Canada)	Gold	40,000^{‡}
New Zealand (RMNZ)	Platinum	15,000^{‡}
Poland (ZPAV)	Gold	10,000^{‡}
United States (RIAA)	Platinum	1,000,000^{‡}
^{‡} Sales+streaming figures based on certification alone.

== Release history ==
List of release dates, showing region, formats, label, and editions
Region	Date	Format(s)	Label	Edition(s)
Australia	November 28, 2014	CD; digital download	Sony	Standard
Germany	November 28, 2014	CD; digital download	Sony	Standard
Ireland	November 28, 2014	CD; digital download	Sony	Standard
Italy	November 28, 2014	CD; digital download	Sony	Standard
New Zealand	November 28, 2014	CD; digital download	Sony	Standard
Canada	December 2, 2014	CD; digital download	Sony	Standard
United States	December 2, 2014	CD; digital download	RCA	Standard
United Kingdom	June 15, 2015	CD; digital download	RCA	Standard
