= What If Nothing =

Studio album by Walk the Moon
- Released: November 10, 2017
- Recorded: 2017
- Length: 55:46 (streaming edition); 58:01 (physical edition)
- Label: RCA
- Producer: Mike Crossey; Mike Elizondo; Captain Cuts

Walk the Moon chronology
Talking Is Hard (2014)	What If Nothing (2017)	Heights (2021)

Singles from What If Nothing
- 1. "One Foot" Released: September 22, 2017; 2. "Kamikaze" Released: April 17, 2018

What If Nothing is the fourth studio album by American rock band Walk the Moon. It was released on November 10, 2017, by RCA Records. The first single released from the album was "One Foot" on September 22, 2017. Walk the Moon embarked on the North American Press Restart Tour in support of the album, beginning on November 19 in Charlotte, North Carolina. They released the first promotional single "Headphones" on October 13, 2017. The second promotional single "Surrender" was released on October 27, 2017. This is the last studio album to feature bassist Kevin Ray, who parted ways with the band in 2020. The album follows-up their previous album Talking is Hard (2014).

== Track listing ==
All tracks are written by Walk the Moon (Nicholas Petricca, Kevin Ray, Sean Waugaman, Eli Maiman). Additional co-writers noted below.

What If Nothing
No.	Title	Writer(s)	Producer	Length
1.	"Press Restart"	Noah Breakfast	Mike Crossey; Mike Elizondo	4:20
2.	"Headphones"		Crossey; Elizondo	3:07
3.	"One Foot"	Captain Cuts	Crossey; Captain Cuts	4:21
4.	"Surrender"	Captain Cuts	Crossey; Captain Cuts	5:04
5.	"All I Want"		Crossey; Elizondo	4:16
6.	"All Night"	Tim Pagnotta	Crossey; Elizondo	3:43
7.	"Kamikaze"	Captain Cuts	Elizondo; Captain Cuts	3:17
8.	"Tiger Teeth"		Crossey; Elizondo	5:23
9.	"Sound of Awakening"		Crossey; Elizondo	6:16
10.	"Feels Good to Be High"	Jack Novak	Crossey; Elizondo	4:21
11.	"Can't Sleep (Wolves)"		Crossey; Elizondo	3:46
12.	"In My Mind"		Crossey; Elizondo	3:57
13.	"Lost in the Wild"	John Ryan	Crossey; Elizondo	3:55
Total length:				55:46

Physical edition
No.	Title	Writer(s)	Producer	Length
13.	"Lost in the Wild" (Contains the hidden track "In My Mind (Acoustic)" after 15 seconds of silence)	Petricca; Ray; Waugaman; Maiman	Crossey; Elizondo	6:16

== Personnel ==
- Nick Petricca – vocals, keyboards, percussion, programming, songwriting
- Kevin Ray – bass, vocals, programming, songwriting
- Sean Waugaman – drums, percussion, vocals, programming, songwriting
- Eli Maiman – guitar, vocals, programming, songwriting

== Charts ==
Chart performance for What If Nothing
Chart (2017)	Peak position
New Zealand Heatseeker Albums (RMNZ)	8
UK Album Downloads (OCC)	60
US Billboard 200	40
US Top Alternative Albums (Billboard)	3
US Top Rock Albums (Billboard)	5
