= Different Colors =

2015 single by Walk the Moon

Single by Walk the Moon

from the album Talking Is Hard
- Released: May 5, 2015
- Studio: Rancho Pagzilla (North Hollywood, California)
- Genre: Alternative rock; electropop; indie rock; pop
- Length: 3:42
- Label: RCA
- Songwriters: Eli Maiman; Kevin Ray; Nicholas Petricca; Sean Waugaman
- Producer: Tim Pagnotta

Walk the Moon singles chronology
"Shut Up and Dance" (2014)	"Different Colors" (2015)	"Work This Body" (2016)

Music video
- "Different Colors" on YouTube

"Different Colors" is a song written and recorded by American rock band Walk the Moon for their third studio album, Talking Is Hard (2014). The song was released to US alternative radio stations by RCA Records as the album's second single on May 5, 2015. Described as an alternative rock, electropop, indie rock, and pop song, it is lyrically about celebrating and embracing each other's differences by speaking out against discrimination of any kind.

Some music critics gave "Different Colors" praise for its chorus and production; others felt it was a step down from the band's earlier singles. The song peaked at number seven on the Billboard Alternative Songs chart, becoming Walk the Moon's third top ten track on the chart. A music video for the song was released on June 11, 2015, featuring footage of the band touring with colorful visuals. The song was performed live by Walk the Moon at award shows, including the 2015 MTV Video Music Awards. It was included on the setlist for the band's Talking Is Hard Tour (2015) and was used in campaigns of Pepsi, AT&T & Apple.

== Background and composition ==
"Different Colors"
A 22-second sample of "Different Colors", featuring tape delay from Eli Maiman's guitar in the pre-chorus and multiple "oooh-e-oooh-e-ooohs" throughout the chorus.

"Different Colors" was written by all four members of Walk the Moon, while recorded at Rancho Pagzilla in North Hollywood, California. The song was produced by Tim Pagnotta and mixed by Neal Avron at The Casita in Hollywood, California. Mastering was handled by Joe LaPorta at Sterling Sound, New York City. The track has been referred to as an alternative rock, electropop, indie rock, and pop song by music journalists. The song is composed of numerous ebullient synths, layered, upbeat guitars, and distant-sounding vocals. It features multiple "oooh-e-oooh-e-ooohs" in the intro and throughout its chorus. Guitarist Eil Maiman used a tape delay for the intro and pre-chorus that is set faster than the song's tempo because he wanted to "create a weird, kind of off-balance effect". In his explanation for using the delay, Maiman said: "As wonderful and delicious as tempo-locked delays are, I've found that occasionally out of time repeats can sound really hip and fresh." As he tracked guitars for the song, the band "tr[ied] com[ing] up with weird noises" to add something bombastic to the last chorus when Pagnotta shouted at them to "just kick the amp over". Maiman complied with the suggestion, causing a "bizarre roar" that the band loved and kept in the recording.

Lead vocalist Nicholas Petricca stated that the song addresses "any part of this world that is diverse and sometimes struggles to be treated with a sense of normalcy". In an interview with Time magazine, Petricca commented on how "Different Colors" differed from their previous single "Shut Up and Dance" by saying that "it shows a different side of [the band] that's equally important", which is "taking this platform [they]'ve got as [the band] get[s] more popular to say something that's meaningful to [them]". He went on to say that the song "is all about not just tolerating each other's differences but celebrating them and embracing them". Maiman also added that it was "a chance for [Walk the Moon] to sort of empower people, especially kids, to have the courage to be themselves and to stand out".

When talking about the inspiration for "Different Colors", Petricca mentioned that while the song "speaks out against discrimination of all kinds, it was the fight for marriage equality that initially inspired the song". He mentioned being frustrated that news segments were still arguing about same-sex marriage and whether people should have equal rights in 2013. Petricca said "it should be second nature at this point" and that the band wanted "to write a victory march and a call to arms for everyone" that is "about equality and love in every way".

== Release and reception ==
"Different Colors" was released as the opening track of Walk the Moon's sophomore album Talking Is Hard. It was first made available as an instant gratification track for pre-orders of Talking Is Hard via iTunes and Amazon on November 17, 2014. Simultaneously, the song was made available for steaming on SoundCloud. It impacted US alternative radio stations on May 5, 2015, through RCA Records as the second single from Talking Is Hard. On September 4, 2015, an acoustic version of "Different Colors" was included for the acoustic single release of "Shut Up and Dance". An extended play was released digitally on December 4 of that year, which includes two remixes of "Different Colors", done by Lost Kings and The Griswolds, respectively. The EP also features a cover of "It's Your Thing" by the Isley Brothers, and the song "Boyfriend" that was previously only available on the UK and Japanese editions of Talking Is Hard. Proceeds from the sales of the Different Colors EP were set to be donated to the Human Rights Campaign (HRC). On June 30, 2022, a new version of the song featuring Jake Wesley Rogers, titled "Different Colors x Pride", was made available via digital outlets in honor of the last day of Pride Month. Proceeds from the updated recording were to be donated to Cyndi Lauper's True Colors United charity, which supports homeless LGBTQ+ youth.

James Grebey of Spin magazine stated that while the track "doesn't reach the high-highs" of the band's 2012 hit "Anna Sun", it "achieves a similar feel-good vibe" and praised the catchiness of the song's chorus. James Christopher Monger of AllMusic said that "Different Colors" offers "a nice mix of Bastille-influenced, swirly electro-pop atmosphere and dense, heavily arpeggiated retro-fitted indie rock". Vulture's Lauretta Charlton noted that its use of synths and "oooh-e-oooh-e-ooohs" made the song "sound like it was written about 30 years ago", but commented that it was "not a bad thing". Chris DeVille, writing for Stereogum, was less enthusiastic towards the song, writing that it "marks a steep decline" from "Shut Up and Dance", but called the chorus "probably strong enough to save Walk the Moon from one-hit wonder status". Mitchell Bozzetto of Renowned for Sound also did not think the song lived up to the band's previous singles from Walk the Moon (2012) due to its "somewhat cheesy vibe".

Alternative Addiction gave three out of five stars in a positive review of the Different Colors EP, calling Walk the Moon's cover of "It's Your Thing" a "cool rendition" and the new song "Boyfriend" a "decent listen", despite not "stand[ing] out as anything too amazing". The staff of the publication noted that the two "Different Colors" remixes were the highlights of the EP and concluded the review by saying: "If you're a fan of the band, you'll find something you want to listen to here." Alternative Addiction later included "Different Colors" on their "Top 200 of the 2010s" list at number 180.

== Commercial performance ==
"Different Colors" debuted at number 36 on the US Billboard Alternative Songs chart dated July 4, 2015, becoming Walk the Moon's fourth entry on the chart. The song eventually peaked at number seven on the week ending October 9, 2015, making it the band's third top ten hit on the Alternative Songs chart. The song spent a total of 20 weeks on the chart and ranked at number 34 on the US Alternative Songs year-end chart for 2015. It performed similarly on the Rock Airplay chart, peaking at number 12 for the issue date of October 30, 2015, and spending 20 weeks on the chart. On the US Hot Rock Songs chart, "Different Colors" reached number 26 on the week ending October 23, 2015, and also logged 20 weeks on the chart. For the issue dated December 25, 2015, the song charted on the Hot Singles Sales chart for one week at number three, following the release of the Different Colors EP. Outside of the United States, "Different Colors" achieved minor success in Canada, peaking at number 38 on the Canada Rock airplay chart.

== Promotional videos ==
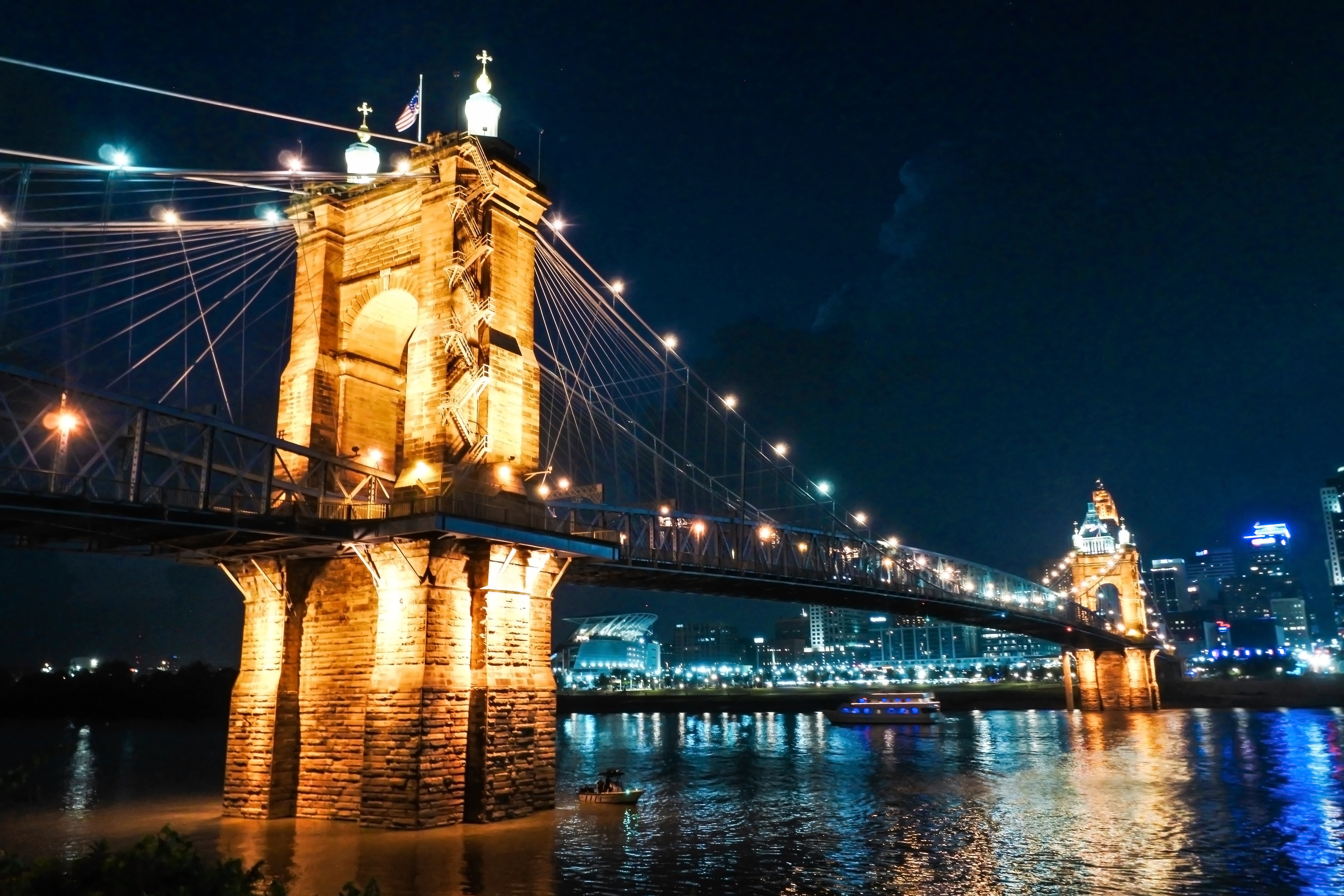
The John A. Roebling Suspension Bridge (pictured) is one of Cincinnati's landmarks featured in the lyric video for "Different Colors".

A lyric video for "Different Colors" was filmed in Walk the Moon's hometown of Cincinnati, Ohio and was uploaded to their Vevo account on June 3, 2015. City landmarks featured in the video include Eden Park, the John A. Roebling Suspension Bridge, the Ohio River, Cincinnati Union Terminal, and Sawyer Point Park & Yeatman's Cove. The visual stood as the band's second video to be filmed in Cincinnati, after "Anna Sun" in 2010. Over 15,000 long exposure photographs went into making the clip.

An accompanying music video, featuring scenes and footage from the band's spring tour, was released on June 11, 2015. It was directed by Nathan Crooker and Patrick Nichols and filmed at Susquehanna Bank Center for WRFF's Birthday Show in May. The video visually includes the bright colors of the band's tattoos, bright sneakers, and neon face paint. Petricca elaborated on the deal with the face paint, which was picked up from the "Anna Sun" video, saying: "We've heard time and time again that people make friends out there because they don't have face paint, so they've got to meet the person [next to them]. For us, it's just a fun expression of that inner child." Referencing the creation of the music video, Walk the Moon tweeted that they "get to experience such vibrant creativity and diversity in the people and places [they meet and] visit," so the video is built out of "some of [the band's] favorite moments from [their] journey across North America this past spring".

== Live performances and use in other media ==
"Different Colors" was first performed live at the Observatory in Santa Ana on October 16, 2013 by Walk the Moon. The song was included on the setlist of their Talking Is Hard Tour (2015). That same year, the band played "Different Colors", "Shut Up and Dance", and "Anna Sun" in an acoustic set at KROQ's Red Bull Sound Space. It was performed live by them from the iHeartRadio Theater for the ALT987fm Carl's Jr. All-Natural Concert Series. Walk the Moon performed "Different Colors" along with "Shut Up and Dance" at the 2015 MTV Video Music Awards pre-show on August 30, 2015. The song was performed by the band for The Tonight Show Starring Jimmy Fallon on September 25 of that year. They also performed it at the Austin City Limits Music Festival on October 3, 2015. Walk the Moon performed a six-song set that included "Different Colors" at the Nickelodeon HALO Awards on November 7 of that year. The song was played on the second day of the Shaky Knees Music Festival in 2016. It was set to be performed live at Rock in Rio the following year on September 17, 2017. On the evening of July 14, 2018, the band performed "Different Colors" as part of a 10-song set at the USANA Amphitheatre. They later performed the song at SumTur Amphitheater on July 30 of that year. It was performed by them at the Firefly Music Festival on June 23, 2019.

"Different Colors" was used in the trailer for Paper Towns (2015), an adaptation of John Green's novel of the same name. Beginning in June 2015, the song was featured in several television commercials for Pop Open Music, the summer music program of Pepsi. Walk the Moon had signed on as one of the first bands to partner with Pepsi on the project. Additionally, "Different Colors" was also featured in a short video titled "Subway Serenade" for AT&T's Feel the Music campaign, a social project designed to improve music access to the Deaf and Hard of Hearing community. AT&T worked with the Deaf Professional Arts Network to create the video using American Sign Language (ASL). The video features performers in a subway dancing, while rhythmically signing the lyrics of the song to enable those that are deaf and hard of hearing to appreciate the clip. Though AT&T initially wanted to use "Shut Up and Dance" for the video, the band felt that "the lyrics of 'Different Colors' were a better fit".

== Track listings ==
- Digital download
1. "Different Colors" – 3:42
- Digital download – EP
1. "Different Colors" – 3:41
2. "It's Your Thing" – 2:47
3. "Boyfriend" – 2:57
4. "Different Colors" (Lost Kings Remix) – 3:05
5. "Different Colors" (The Griswolds Remix) – 3:56
- Digital download and streaming
1. "Different Colors x Pride" (featuring Jake Wesley Rogers) – 3:30

== Credits and personnel ==
Credits adapted from the liner notes of Talking Is Hard.

Locations

- Recorded at Rancho Pagzilla, North Hollywood, California
- Mixed at The Casita, Hollywood, California
- Mastered at Sterling Sound, New York City

Personnel

- Nick Petricca – vocals, keyboards, percussion, programming, songwriting
- Kevin Ray – bass, vocals, songwriting
- Sean Waugaman – percussion, vocals, songwriting
- Eli Maiman – guitar, vocals, programming, songwriting
- Ben Berger – vocal production
- Ryan McMahon – vocal production
- Jarett Holmes – programming, recording, digital editing
- Tim Pagnotta – production, recording
- Brian Phillips – digital editing
- Allen Casillas – digital editing
- Ryan Gillmore – digital editing
- Mauro Rubbi – drum technician
- Blake Mares – assistant engineer
- Robert Cohen – assistant engineer
- Neal Avron – mixing
- Scott Skrzynski – mixing assistant
- Joe LaPorta – mastering

== Charts ==
=== Weekly charts ===
Weekly chart performance for "Different Colors"
Chart (2015)	Peak position
Canada Rock (Billboard)	38
US Hot Rock & Alternative Songs (Billboard)	26
US Hot Singles Sales (Billboard)	3
US Rock & Alternative Airplay (Billboard)	12

=== Year-end charts ===
2015 year-end chart performance for "Different Colors"
Chart (2015)	Position
US Hot Rock & Alternative Songs (Billboard)	75
US Rock Airplay (Billboard)	48

== Release history ==
Release dates and formats for "Different Colors"
Region	Date	Format	Label(s)	Ref.
Various	November 17, 2014	Digital download; streaming	RCA; Sony	
United States	May 5, 2015	Alternative radio	RCA; Sony	
Various	December 4, 2015	Digital download – EP	RCA; Sony	
Various	June 30, 2022	Digital download; streaming	Moon	
