= Heights (album) =

Studio album by Walk the Moon
- Released: November 12, 2021
- Genre: Pop rock, alternative pop
- Length: 50:20
- Label: RCA
- Producer: Captain Cuts; Mike Crossey; Tommy English; Jonas Jeberg; Paul Meany; Nicholas Petricca

Walk the Moon chronology
What If Nothing (2017)	Heights (2021)	The Liftaway (2023)

Singles from Heights
- 1. "Can You Handle My Love??" Released: July 14, 2021; 2. "Fire in Your House" Released: September 17, 2021; 3. "Rise Up" Released: October 27, 2021; 4. "Giants" Released: May 10, 2022

Heights is the fifth studio album by American pop rock band Walk the Moon, released on November 12, 2021, through RCA Records. The album is Walk the Moon's first studio album to be recorded since bassist Kevin Ray left the band in December 2020.

== Background ==
On July 14, 2021, the band released the lead single "Can You Handle My Love??", alongside two promotional singles "I'm Good" and "Giants". In frontman Nicholas Petricca's words, "the album is buttressed by songs that are eight or nine years old, and that the band writes a lot of songs for each record, so there's a lot of material that doesn't get used, and it's not because we don't love those babies. Sometimes it takes a while for them to grow up, or for us to find the right way to really bring them to life."

In September 2021, the band released their second single, "Fire in Your House", which features South-African musician Johnny Clegg, along with his son Jesse. It was released alongside the promotional single "DNA (The Keys)".

On October 27, 2021, the band released "Rise Up" as the third single from the album. The album's final single, "Giants", was released on May 10, 2022.

== Track listing ==
Heights track listing
No.	Title	Writer(s)	Length
1.	"Heights"	Nicholas Petricca; Eli Maiman; Sean Waugaman; Kevin Ray	4:15
2.	"Can You Handle My Love??"	Petricca; Maiman; Waugaman; Thomas Schleiter; Kristine Flaherty	4:16
3.	"Giants"	Petricca; Maiman; Waugaman; Leah Haywood; Daniel James; Rob Ellmore	3:42
4.	"I'm Good"	Petricca; Maiman; Waugaman; Zach Skelton; Paul Meany; James Norton	4:36
5.	"DNA (The Keys)"	Petricca; Maiman; Waugaman; Ray; Ryan Rabin; Ben Berger; Ryan McMahon	3:53
6.	"Fire in Your House" (featuring Johnny Clegg and Jesse Clegg)	Petricca; Maiman; Waugaman; Johnny Clegg; Jesse Clegg; Meany	4:55
7.	"Don't Make Me"	Petricca; Maiman; Waugman; Ray; Jon Hume	3:27
8.	"Rise Up"	Petricca; Maiman; Waugaman; Ray; Jonas Jeberg; Sam Hollander	4:17
9.	"My Kids"	Petricca; Maiman; Waugaman; James Flannigan; Genevieve Elisse Schatz	2:54
10.	"Someone Else's Game"	Petricca; Maiman; Waugaman; Ray	5:11
11.	"What You Can't Look Up"	Petricca; Maiman; Waugaman; Ray	4:17
12.	"Population of Two"	Petricca; Maiman; Waugaman; Ray	4:37
Total length:			50:20

== Personnel ==
Walk the Moon

- Nicholas Petricca – lead vocals, keyboards, producer
- Eli Maiman – bass, guitar, backing vocals
- Sean Waugaman – drums, percussion, backing vocals

Additional personnel

- Neal Avron – mixing
- Captain Cuts – producer
- Jeff Clegg — featured artist
- Johnny Clegg – acoustic guitar, featured artist, vocals
- Mike Crossey – producer
- Tommy English – producer
- Chris Gehringer – mastering
- Clare Gillen – creative direction
- Carter Jahan – engineer
- Jonas Jeberg – producer
- Wyatt Knowles – cover design
- Ryan McMahon – bass
- Paul Meany – keyboards, producer
- Alex Pasco – engineer
- Stephen Sesso – engineer
- Scott Skrzynski – mixing assistance
- Grant Spanier – photography
