= Kamikaze (Walk the Moon song) =

2018 single by Walk the Moon

Single by Walk the Moon

from the album What If Nothing
- Released: April 17, 2018
- Genre: Alternative rock; pop
- Length: 3:17
- Label: RCA
- Songwriter(s): Ben Berger; Eli Maiman; Ryan McMahon; Nicholas Petricca; Ryan Rabin; Kevin Ray; Sean Waugaman
- Producer(s): Mike Elizondo; Captain Cuts

Walk the Moon singles chronology
"One Foot" (2017)	"Kamikaze" (2018)	"Home" (2018)

Music video
- "Kamikaze" on YouTube

"Kamikaze" is a song by American pop rock band Walk the Moon for their fourth studio album, What If Nothing (2017). It was sent to US alternative radio stations as the album's second single on April 17, 2018, through RCA Records. The song was written by the band members and songwriters Ben Berger, Ryan McMahon and Ryan Rabin; the latter three also co-produced it with Mike Elizondo. "Kamikaze" is an alternative rock and pop song that features multi-layered production with elements of electronic dance music. Its lyrics describe going all-in and having full control of one's self.

"Kamikaze" was met with mixed reviews from music critics, with some commenting on the song's addictive and catchy nature, while others compared it unfavorably to the likes of Imagine Dragons. It peaked at number six on the Billboard Alternative Songs chart and became the band's fifth top-ten hit on the chart. A music video for the song, featuring multiple performers dancing in a stark white room, was released on April 16, 2018. "Kamikaze" was included on Walk the Moon's setlist for the Press Restart Tour (2017−18) and was performed on Jimmy Kimmel Live! and The Late Show with Stephen Colbert.

== Background and release ==
"Kamikaze" was written by the members of Walk the Moon along with Ben Berger, Ryan McMahon and Ryan Rabin, who collectively go by the name Captain Cuts. The members of Captain Cuts also produced the song with Mike Elizondo. Mixing was handled by Neal Avron with assistance from Scott Skrzynski. The band recalled how the lyric in the chorus, "I'm a kamikaze", came to them "instinctually on day 1". Months later, they would spend a whole day "trying to come up with something better", but went nowhere with it.

On November 7, 2017, "Kamikaze" was released as the fourth advance track and third promotional single from Walk the Moon's third studio album, What If Nothing. Following the release of its music video, the song was sent to US alternative radio stations a day later on April 17, 2018, by RCA Records as the album's second single.

== Composition and lyrics ==
"Kamikaze" runs for three minutes and seventeen seconds and has been described as a hip-hop flavored, pop-friendly alternative rock track that incorporates elements of electronic dance music. It has a minor-key melody with a 4/4 time signature and a tempo of 78 beats per minute. The song features a heavily beat-driven chorus and multi-layered, synth-laden production. It is played over rumbling bass and contains some sharp, screeching electric guitar riffs.

In an interview with Billboard leading up to the release of What If Nothing, lead singer Nicholas Petricca revealed that the song has two sides for him, one that's about "being in love with someone and having to leave them behind," while the other is having "full ownership of self" and "being all-in". He mentioned how "that belief in yourself and that belief in something greater than yourself as well is un-fuck-with-able". Petricca later stated in an Instagram post about the music video that "the Kamikaze is a peaceful warrior of love who is willing to sacrifice the status quo" and "love despite all odds".

== Critical reception ==
"Kamikaze" received mixed reviews from music critics. Time's Raisa Bruner called "Kamikaze" an "urgent and immediately catchy song", praising its production and commending Petricca's vocals of being "anthem-worthy". Alternative Addiction said that "Kamikaze" is an "addictive song that will resonate with avid and casual listeners of the band". Allan Raible of ABC News commented that the song "has a lasting bounce to its gate". Stereogum's Chris DeVille was more negative towards the song, writing how the track "unfortunately toys with EDM low end á la Imagine Dragons or Fall Out Boy". Eric Renner Brown of Entertainment Weekly called the song "generic" and said it "sounds yanked from Imagine Dragons' reject pile".

Editors at Apple Music included "Kamikaze" on its 2018 Songs of the Summer playlist, a list of predictions for that year's top summer songs based on streaming statistics.

== Commercial performance ==
In the United States, "Kamikaze" peaked at number six on Billboard's Alternative Songs chart on the week ending September 28, 2018, making it the band's second consecutive top-ten hit on the chart from What If Nothing after their previous release "One Foot" and fifth overall. It concurrently reached its peak of number 19 on the Billboard Hot Rock Songs chart. The song ranked at number 16 on the 2018 year-end Alternative Songs chart. Elsewhere, the song reached number 48 on the Billboard Canada Rock airplay chart.

== Music video ==
The music video for "Kamikaze" was directed by Tobias Nathan and was uploaded to Walk the Moon's official YouTube channel on April 16, 2018. The video features a modern dance performance choreographed by Amy Gardner. A version of the video with an extended ending can be found on the director's Vimeo account.

The clip begins with a shot of the band in ankle-deep water performing the song in front of the same scenery used on their Press Restart Tour (2017−18). The video then focuses on a male and female dancer, both minimally-dressed, played by Derek Tabda and Nicola Collie. They start intimately swaying together in a stark white room, where their positions emulate those of the band. They are then joined by a larger group of dancers, who add another level of emotion to the intense choreography. Shots of the band stomping and splashing in the shallow water, reflecting the backdrop's dramatic flashing lights, are shown intermittently throughout the video. It ends with a close-up of the female dancer, who has tears rolling down her cheek and is left breathless.

== Live performances ==
On December 11, 2017, Walk the Moon performed "Kamikaze" along with "One Foot" on Jimmy Kimmel Live! for Kimmel's Mercedes-Benz Concert Series. In the performance, Petricca had his mullet bleached blond and wore a knee-length cardigan with eyes printed all over. Petricca also had white face paint streaming out from the corner of his eyes, which had been a staple of the group's aesthetic. Walk the Moon later performed the song on The Late Show with Stephen Colbert. The song was included on the set list of the band's 2017−18 Press Restart Tour.

== Credits and personnel ==
Credits adapted from Tidal and the liner notes of What If Nothing.

=== Recording ===
- Engineered at Can Am (Tarzana, California)
- Mixed at The Casita (Hollywood, California)

=== Personnel ===
- Nicholas Petricca – vocals, keyboards, songwriting
- Kevin Ray – bass, songwriting
- Eli Maiman – guitar, songwriting
- Sean Waugaman – drums, songwriting
- Mike Elizondo – production
- Benjamin Berger – songwriting, co-production
- Ryan McMahon – songwriting, co-production
- Ryan Rabin – songwriting, co-production
- Brent Arrowood – engineering assistant
- Scott Skrzynski – mixing assistant
- Adam Hawkins – engineering
- Neal Avron – mixing

== Charts ==
=== Weekly charts ===
Chart (2018)	Peak position
Canada Rock (Billboard)	48
US Hot Rock & Alternative Songs (Billboard)	19
US Rock & Alternative Airplay (Billboard)	9

=== Year-end charts ===
Chart (2018)	Position
US Hot Rock & Alternative Songs (Billboard)	47
US Rock Airplay (Billboard)	30

== Release history ==
Region	Date	Format	Label	Ref.
Various	November 7, 2017 (Note: Release as a promotional single.)	Digital download; streaming	RCA; Sony	
United States	April 17, 2018	Alternative radio	RCA; Sony	
