= Shut Up and Dance (Walk the Moon song) =

2014 single by Walk the Moon

Single by Walk the Moon

from the album Talking Is Hard
- Released: September 10, 2014
- Studio: Rancho Pagzilla (North Hollywood, California)
- Genre: Pop rock; power pop; synth rock; alternative rock; new wave
- Length: 3:17
- Label: RCA
- Songwriters: Ben Berger; Eli Maiman; Ryan McMahon; Nicholas Petricca; Kevin Ray; Sean Waugaman
- Producer: Tim Pagnotta

Walk the Moon singles chronology
| "Tightrope" (2012) | "Shut Up and Dance" (2014) | "Different Colors" (2015) |

Music video
- "Shut Up and Dance" on YouTube

"Shut Up and Dance" (stylized as "SHUT UP + DANCE") is a song by American pop rock band Walk the Moon from their third studio album Talking Is Hard (2014). It was written by the band members and songwriters Ben Berger and Ryan McMahon. The song is based on an experience lead singer Nicholas Petricca had at a Los Angeles nightclub. His girlfriend invited him to dance, inspiring the title. Petricca envisioned the song as an anthem for letting go of frustration and having fun. The song was digitally released as the lead single from Talking Is Hard on September 10, 2014.

The song became the band's biggest hit single to date, peaking at number four on the Billboard Hot 100 and becoming a number-one hit on the magazine's Alternative Songs chart and the Hot Adult Contemporary chart. Outside of the United States, "Shut Up and Dance" topped the charts in Poland, peaked within the top ten of the charts in Australia, Canada, Germany, Israel, Ireland, and the United Kingdom, the top 20 of the charts in New Zealand and Sweden, and the top 30 of the charts in the Netherlands. The band has performed "Shut Up and Dance" on The Tonight Show Starring Jimmy Fallon, Late Night with Seth Meyers, Jimmy Kimmel Live!, The Ellen DeGeneres Show and Good Morning America.

== Background ==
The song originated between vocalist Nicholas Petricca and guitarist Eli Maiman, who first developed the verse and found something infectious about it. The following weekend, Petricca went to a party named Funky Soul Saturday at The Echo in Echo Park, Los Angeles, while feeling frustrated with the writing process. Petricca recalled, "We were at the bar, and it was taking forever to get a drink. I was frustrated because there was great music playing and I wanted to be out there." His girlfriend, in "a backless dress and beat up red Chucks", abruptly invited him to dance with her, inspiring the song's title. Petricca later went home to work on the song and incorporated his experiences into the song's lyrics. After creating the song's main refrain, he began picturing himself in high school: an "incredibly uncomfortable, awkward adolescent dude"; he imagined the song as an "anthem for the dork who is 100 percent me". In an interview with American Songwriter, he summarized the song's theme as: "Encouraging people to let go of whatever it is that’s bothering you and get into your body and out of your head."

In terms of the song's music, Petricca highlighted three songs that were instrumental in its creation: "Just What I Needed" (1978) by The Cars, "Hit Me with Your Best Shot" (1980) by Pat Benatar, and "Jessie's Girl" (1981) by Rick Springfield, which he deemed "simple and beautiful and in-your-face rock songs" that captured the sound the band desired. The song is inspired by the music of the 1980s, which the group felt was a time in which "weird" was celebrated, in both music and fashion.

"Shut Up and Dance" premiered on the radio station 101 WKQX in Chicago on June 22, 2014. It was released digitally as the lead single from Talking Is Hard on September 10, 2014. On November 11, 2014, the song was made available in the United States as a free single on iTunes.

== Composition and lyrics ==
"Shut Up and Dance"
A 18-second sample of the chorus to "Shut Up and Dance", a new wave-inspired pop rock, power pop, and synth rock song that utilizes jangly guitars and retro synths played over buzzing bass.

"Shut Up and Dance" is a pop rock, power pop, synth rock, and alternative rock song that is driven by synthesizer and dance grooves. It incorporates production that is reminiscent of the 1980s, with gated ambience added to the drums, sheeny synth pads, reversed snare 'whooshes', and stadium-sized reverb and delay effects. Steve Baltin and Shirley Halperin of Billboard called the song a "new-wave throwback", while Rolling Stone's Brittany Spanos referred to it as "a Killers-style update on Eighties pop hits" such as "And We Danced" (1985) by the Hooters. Mike Wass of Idolator saw the song as "tapping into a '80s rock sound" similar to the band Bleachers.

The song is composed in common time and written in the key of D♭ major with a fast tempo of 128 beats per minute. Ryan Reed of Billboard described Petricca's vocal performance as "flaunt[ing] his emotive yelp" over the track. The song makes use of jangling guitars, thunderous pounds, and retro synths that play over a grumbling disco bass. It additionally includes an open and closed hi-hat pattern, handclaps, and a synth solo. The intro is constructed by two guitar parts, with the first one "playing the arpeggio of the main riff", while the other "play[s] 16th notes on muted strings". According to Maiman, the combination of the two guitars resulted in a "'helicopter' sound", which "is thickened with a dotted eighth note delay set". The main riff itself, also processed with digital delay, was seen as having been influenced by the Edge of U2.

"Shut Up and Dance" is largely based on Petricca's experience that night at The Echo, containing specific lyrical references that refer back to it. The song finds the singer taking to the dance floor with a female friend who wears "[a] backless dress and some beat up sneaks", referring to her as his "discotheque, Juliet teenage dream". The chorus, consisting of two "shut up and dance with me" hook-lines, is accentuated by kick drum hits and accompanied by gang vocals. Jeff Miers of The Buffalo News said that the lyrics "boast the sort of everyman relatability that is required of a pop hit".

== Critical reception ==
Upon the song's release, Mike Wass of Idolator said "Shut Up and Dance" is "pretty irresistible" with its "monstrous chorus and a plethora of hooks". Billboard's Ryan Reed gave the song a four and a half stars out of five, mentioning how Petricca's vocal runs are "catchier than most bands' choruses". AbsolutePunk's Anthony Sorendino wrote that the track is not "a cookie cutter chorus rigged to a cheap set of verses" and that the chord progression is what sells it. AllMusic's James Christopher Monger described the song as a "pulsing, closing credits-ready anthem that oozes upbeat millennial enthusiasm" while having "just enough angst to evoke a Breakfast Club post-lunch therapy session". Mitchell Bozzetto of Renowned for Sound felt it is one of the better tracks off Talking Is Hard, saying "its catchy chorus and overall refreshing atmosphere is quite enjoyable".

The staff of Alternative Addiction picked "Shut Up and Dance" as the top song of 2014, writing that "there isn't a song that's been as catchy or as good released in a long time". Chris DeVille of Stereogum placed it at number 43 on his "50 Best Pop Songs of 2015" list, saying the song is "proof positive" that one does not "have to innovate or [be] trendy to score a hit, [they] just have to write a hit". Consequence of Sound ranked it as the 235th best number one Billboard alternative rock hit in 2017. Killian Young, writing for the publication, viewed the song as "[i]nsipid pop", but complimented its catchiness and called the chorus "crowd-pleasing".

The song is considered by Billboard to be heavily influenced by The Edge of U2 and Vulture describes how the opening riff resembles U2's "Where the Streets Have No Name".

== Commercial performance ==
=== North America ===
"Shut Up and Dance" began topping streaming service Spotify's viral top 50 chart in November 2014. The song peaked at number one on Billboard's Alternative Songs chart (it is the band's second top-ten hit on the chart after "Anna Sun") in the issue dated February 18, 2015, where it made RCA Records only the second label to receive three consecutive number-one hits on the chart (and first in two decades). It also concurrently hit number one on the Rock Airplay chart. The song debuted on the all-genre Hot 100 on November 22, 2014, at position 98, where it stayed there for two weeks before leaving the chart. It re-entered the charts the following week at number 88. It eventually peaked at number 4 on the chart in the Billboard issue of May 30, 2015, becoming Walk the Moon's first top-ten single in the United States. As of January 21, 2016, it has sold 3,231,080 copies domestically. The song broke the record for the longest reign atop Billboard's Hot Rock Songs chart at 27 consecutive weeks, now held by Panic! at the Disco's "High Hopes". "Shut Up and Dance" also entered the Canadian Hot 100 at position 99 for the week ending February 28, 2015. The song peaked at number four and remained in that position for seven consecutive weeks from May 30, 2015, to July 11, 2015. As of August 11, 2015, "Shut Up and Dance" has been certified triple platinum by Music Canada and has sold over 321,000 copies.

=== Europe and Oceania ===
"Shut Up and Dance" made its first chart appearance internationally in the Netherlands on the Singles Top 100 chart at number sixty-five. The song peaked at number 28 on January 7, 2015, and remained there for two non-consecutive weeks. "Shut Up and Dance" proved to be a bigger success in Sweden, entering at position 58 on the Swedish Singles Chart on January 16, 2015. The song reached number 24 on February 27, 2015, before beginning to descend down the chart for the next few weeks. The song began to gain in performance again and entered the top 20 at number 18 on April 27, 2015. "Shut Up and Dance" peaked at number 12 on May 8, 2015, a position it held for two non-consecutive weeks, and has been certified quadruple platinum by the International Federation of the Phonographic Industry of Sweden as of September 23, 2015.

In Ireland, "Shut Up and Dance" debuted at number 91 on the Irish Singles Chart. On July 24, 2015, the song peaked at number two and stayed there for four non-consecutive weeks. In Poland, the song reached number one on the Polish Airplay Chart for one week on August 7, 2015. According to the Polish Society of the Phonographic Industry, "Shut Up and Dance" was the most played song in Poland.

In Australia, "Shut Up and Dance" made its first appearance on the Australian Hitseekers chart at number eight on March 30, 2015. The song made its official debut on the Australian Singles Chart a week later at number 58 on April 6, 2015. On its second week, "Shut Up and Dance" rose to number 41 on April 13, 2015. On April 20, 2015, the song entered the top 20, moving up 24 positions to number 17. "Shut Up and Dance" leaped 12 positions to number five on April 27, 2015, its highest charted position in any region at the time. On May 11, 2015, the song peaked at number three for two consecutive weeks. The song dropped to number 11 on August 3, 2015, after spending three months within the top 10. As of August 22, 2015, "Shut Up and Dance" has been certified quadruple platinum by the Australian Recording Industry Association (ARIA) for shipments of over 210,000 copies.

In the United Kingdom, the single debuted at number seventy-five on the UK Singles Chart for the week ending June 13, 2015. The following week, it flew 67 places to number eight. The next week, it climbed three places to number five. On its fourth week on the chart, it climbed to number four, where it peaked and remained for two weeks. It spent thirteen weeks in the top ten of the UK Singles Chart, which were all consecutive. It fell out of the top ten on the week ending September 17, 2015, having spent just under three months in the top ten. It re-entered the top 40 at number twenty seven for the week ending January 7, 2016. It fell to number thirty one the following week, before dropping out again. It has re-entered on five different occasions since, spending 73 total weeks in the top 100.

== Music video ==
Lead singer Nicholas Petricca presented in front of visuals reminiscent of the opening credits of Saved by the Bell.

The music video for "Shut Up and Dance", directed by Josh Forbes and co-directed by the band members, was shot in Los Angeles in September 2014. It first premiered on the internet radio network 8tracks on October 22, 2014, before it went live on Walk the Moon's Vevo account a day later. Petricca described the video as "a trippy story of dork victory" that was "[i]nfluenced by the plot- driven music videos of the 80s and nerdy visuals of 90s television". In an interview with Mashable, he said that the band intended for it "to be kooky, but also stylish [with] a story you could follow" like the video for Michael Jackson's "Beat It" (1983).

The clip features graphics similar to those used in the opening of Saved by the Bell (1989–93) that take over the screen. Vulture's Lauretta Charlton wrote that the video's plot "is a retelling of th[e] events" at The Echo, with the exception of "look[ing] like it was filmed in a laser-tag arena instead of a nightclub". Lauren Taft stars alongside Petricca as the "woman of his dreams" that he meets on the dance floor, mouthing the lyrics to the song as they dance together. Idolator's Mike Wass called it a "hilarious visual" where "things get really weird thanks to a serious case of dance floor concussion". Stereogum's Chris DeVille said the video is "an excellent sendup" that pointedly embraces its '80s influences as "a knowing pastiche of side ponytails, neon, and references to early MTV". MTV's Gil Kaufman remarked that the video is "so retro it might give Simon LeBon whiplash". It received a nomination at the 2015 MTV Video Music Awards for Best Rock Video, but lost to Fall Out Boy's "Uma Thurman" (2015).

== Live performances and other usage ==
Walk the Moon played "Shut Up and Dance" live for the first time at Saint Louis University. The song received its first televised appearance on September 15, 2014, on Late Night with Seth Meyers. Starting in October, the band went on a North American tour to promote the song called the Shut Up and Tour (2014). Upon the release of Talking Is Hard, the band played the song along with "Anna Sun" on Jimmy Kimmel Live! on December 2, 2014. It was later included on the setlist of their Talking Is Hard Tour the following year in support of the album. On February 19, 2015, the band performed it on The Tonight Show Starring Jimmy Fallon. In March of that year, Walk the Moon performed the song on The Ellen DeGeneres Show. The band performed the song on The Today Show on April 15, 2015. They performed it on Good Morning America on July 10, 2015, in New York's Central Park. Since the band hails from Cincinnati, "Shut Up and Dance" and "Different Colors" was performed in front of a hometown audience at the 2015 Major League Baseball Home Run Derby at Great American Ball Park prior to the start of the exhibition contest on July 13, 2015. The band made a guest appearance at Taylor Swift's 1989 World Tour, performing the song together on July 24 in Foxborough, Massachusetts. Walk the Moon performed the song at the 2015 MTV Video Music Awards pre-show on August 30, 2015, where the band played on a circular, multicolored stage prior to the show's start. On December 31, 2015, the band performed the song on Dick Clark's New Year's Rockin' Eve in Times Square. On February 13, 2016, the band performed "Shut Up and Dance" and "Work This Body" at the 2016 NBA All-Star Game in Toronto, Canada.

The song is featured in the 2018 American Broadway musical, Moulin Rouge!, mashed up with Pink's "Raise Your Glass". Kelly Clarkson sang a gender-flip version of this song on her television variety talk show The Kelly Clarkson Show.

The song was featured in the 2025 Paul Thomas Anderson film One Battle After Another.

== Track listing ==
- Digital download
1. "Shut Up and Dance" – 3:17
- CD single
1. "Shut Up and Dance" – 3:17
2. "Shut Up and Dance" (Live at Sirius XM) – 3:15
- Digital download – Acoustic
1. "Shut Up and Dance" (Acoustic) – 3:13
2. "Different Colors" (Acoustic) – 3:24
- Digital download – White Panda Remix
1. "Shut Up and Dance" (White Panda Remix) – 3:41

== Credits and personnel ==
Credits adapted from the liner notes of Talking Is Hard.

Locations

- Recorded at Rancho Pagzilla, North Hollywood, California
- Mixed at The Casita, Hollywood, California
- Mastered at Sterling Sound, New York City

Personnel

- Nick Petricca – vocals, keyboards, percussion, programming, songwriting
- Kevin Ray – bass, vocals, songwriting
- Sean Waugaman – percussion, vocals, songwriting
- Eli Maiman – guitar, vocals, programming, songwriting
- Ben Berger – songwriting, vocal production, co-production
- Ryan McMahon – songwriting, vocal production, co-production
- Jarett Holmes – programming, recording, digital editing
- Tim Pagnotta – production, recording
- Brian Phillips – digital editing
- Allen Casillas – digital editing
- Ryan Gillmore – digital editing
- Mauro Rubbi – drum technician
- Andrew "Muffman" Luftman – recording assistant
- Kuk Harrell – vocal recording
- Marcos Tovar – vocal recording
- Blake Mares – assistant engineer
- Robert Cohen – assistant engineer
- Neal Avron – mixing
- Scott Skrzynski – mixing assistant
- Joe LaPorta – mastering

== Charts ==
=== Weekly charts ===
| Chart (2015–2016) | Peak position |
|---|---|
| Australia (ARIA) | 3 |
| Austria (Ö3 Austria Top 40) | 7 |
| Belgium (Ultratop 50 Flanders) | 21 |
| Belgium (Ultratip Bubbling Under Wallonia) | 14 |
| Canada Hot 100 (Billboard) | 4 |
| Canada AC (Billboard) | 1 |
| Canada CHR/Top 40 (Billboard) | 1 |
| Canada Hot AC (Billboard) | 1 |
| Canada Rock (Billboard) | 22 |
| Colombia (National Report Top Rock) | 1 |
| Colombia Anglo (Monitor Latino) | 5 |
| Czech Republic Airplay (ČNS IFPI) | 2 |
| Czech Republic Singles Digital (ČNS IFPI) | 15 |
| Denmark (Tracklisten) | 35 |
| Euro Digital Song Sales (Billboard) | 4 |
| Finland Airplay (Radiosoittolista) | 61 |
| France (SNEP) | 28 |
| Germany (GfK) | 10 |
| Hungary (Rádiós Top 40) | 7 |
| Hungary (Single Top 40) | 17 |
| Hungary (Stream Top 40) | 26 |
| Ireland (IRMA) | 2 |
| Israel International Airplay (Media Forest) | 8 |
| Italy (FIMI) | 79 |
| Japan Hot 100 (Billboard) | 17 |
| Japan Hot Overseas (Billboard) | 2 |
| Mexico Anglo (Monitor Latino) | 10 |
| Mexico (Billboard Mexican Airplay) | 18 |
| Netherlands (Dutch Top 40) | 22 |
| Netherlands (Single Top 100) | 28 |
| New Zealand (Recorded Music NZ) | 11 |
| Poland Airplay (ZPAV) | 1 |
| Portugal (AFP) | 83 |
| Scottish Singles Sales (Official Charts) | 2 |
| Slovakia Airplay (ČNS IFPI) | 2 |
| Slovakia Singles Digital (ČNS IFPI) | 22 |
| Slovenia (SloTop50) | 5 |
| South Korea (Gaon) | 45 |
| Spain (Promusicae) | 56 |
| Sweden (Sverigetopplistan) | 12 |
| Switzerland (Schweizer Hitparade) | 20 |
| UK Singles (Official Charts) | 4 |
| US Billboard Hot 100 | 4 |
| US Adult Contemporary (Billboard) | 1 |
| US Adult Pop Airplay (Billboard) | 1 |
| US Dance Club Songs (Billboard) | 28 |
| US Dance Airplay (Billboard) | 6 |
| US Hot Rock & Alternative Songs (Billboard) | 1 |
| US Pop Airplay (Billboard) | 2 |
| US Rock & Alternative Airplay (Billboard) | 1 |

| Chart (2024) | Peak position |
|---|---|
| Global 200 (Billboard) | 166 |

=== Year-end charts ===
| Chart (2014) | Position |
|---|---|
| Netherlands (Dutch Top 40) | 180 |
| US Hot Rock Songs (Billboard) | 60 |

| Chart (2015) | Position |
|---|---|
| Australia (ARIA) | 8 |
| Austria (Ö3 Austria Top 40) | 25 |
| Belgium (Ultratop 50 Flanders) | 69 |
| Canada (Canadian Hot 100) | 10 |
| Denmark (Tracklisten) | 95 |
| France (SNEP) | 118 |
| Germany (Official German Charts) | 35 |
| Hungary (Rádiós Top 40) | 39 |
| Hungary (Single Top 40) | 96 |
| Ireland (IRMA) | 8 |
| Israel (Media Forest) | 26 |
| Japan (Japan Hot 100) | 83 |
| Japan Hot Overseas (Billboard) | 11 |
| Netherlands (Dutch Top 40) | 98 |
| Netherlands (Single Top 100) | 55 |
| New Zealand (Recorded Music NZ) | 19 |
| Poland (ZPAV) | 1 |
| South Korea International Chart (Gaon) | 90 |
| Sweden (Sverigetopplistan) | 16 |
| Switzerland (Schweizer Hitparade) | 55 |
| UK Singles (OCC) | 19 |
| US Billboard Hot 100 | 6 |
| US Hot Rock Songs (Billboard) | 1 |
| US Rock Airplay (Billboard) | 2 |
| US Adult Alternative Songs (Billboard) | 39 |
| US Adult Contemporary (Billboard) | 4 |
| US Adult Top 40 (Billboard) | 1 |
| US Alternative Songs (Billboard) | 2 |
| US Dance/Mix Show Airplay (Billboard) | 27 |
| US Mainstream Top 40 (Billboard) | 2 |

| Chart (2016) | Position |
|---|---|
| Argentina (Monitor Latino) | 70 |
| Brazil (Brasil Hot 100) | 63 |
| Slovenia (SloTop50) | 26 |
| UK Singles (OCC) | 94 |
| US Adult Contemporary (Billboard) | 15 |
| US Hot Rock Songs (Billboard) | 18 |

| Chart (2017) | Position |
|---|---|
| Slovenia (SloTop50) | 20 |

| Chart (2022) | Position |
|---|---|
| Hungary (Rádiós Top 40) | 85 |

| Chart (2024) | Position |
|---|---|
| UK Singles (OCC) | 85 |

=== Decade-end charts ===
| Chart (2010–2019) | Position |
|---|---|
| Australia (ARIA) | 77 |
| UK Singles (OCC) | 44 |
| US Hot Rock Songs (Billboard) | 7 |

=== All-time charts ===
| Chart | Position |
|---|---|
| US Adult Top 40 (Billboard) | 11 |
| US Mainstream Top 40 (Billboard) | 86 |
| US Alternative Songs (Billboard) | 134 |

== Certifications ==
| Region | Certification | Certified units/sales |
|---|---|---|
| Australia (ARIA) | 15× Platinum | 1,050,000^{‡} |
| Austria (IFPI Austria) | Gold | 15,000^{*} |
| Belgium (BRMA) | Gold | 10,000^{‡} |
| Canada (Music Canada) | 7× Platinum | 560,000^{‡} |
| Denmark (IFPI Danmark) | 3× Platinum | 270,000^{‡} |
| Germany (BVMI) | 2× Platinum | 1,200,000^{‡} |
| Italy (FIMI) | Platinum | 50,000^{‡} |
| Mexico (AMPROFON) | 4× Platinum+Gold | 270,000^{‡} |
| New Zealand (RMNZ) | 8× Platinum | 240,000^{‡} |
| Norway (IFPI Norway) | Platinum | 10,000^{‡} |
| South Korea | — | 121,346 |
| Spain (Promusicae) | 2× Platinum | 120,000^{‡} |
| Sweden (GLF) | 4× Platinum | 160,000^{‡} |
| United Kingdom (BPI) | 7× Platinum | 4,200,000^{‡} |
| United States (RIAA) | 14× Platinum | 14,000,000^{‡} |
^{*} Sales figures based on certification alone.^{‡} Sales+streaming figures based on certification alone.

== Release history ==
| Region | Date | Format | Version | Label | Ref. |
|---|---|---|---|---|---|
| Belgium | September 10, 2014 | Digital download | Original | RCA; Sony | |
| Canada | September 10, 2014 | Digital download | Original | RCA; Sony | |
| Finland | September 10, 2014 | Digital download | Original | RCA; Sony | |
| Ireland | September 10, 2014 | Digital download | Original | RCA; Sony | |
| Italy | September 10, 2014 | Digital download | Original | RCA; Sony | |
| Luxembourg | September 10, 2014 | Digital download | Original | RCA; Sony | |
| Netherlands | September 10, 2014 | Digital download | Original | RCA; Sony | |
| New Zealand | September 10, 2014 | Digital download | Original | RCA; Sony | |
| Norway | September 10, 2014 | Digital download | Original | RCA; Sony | |
| Portugal | September 10, 2014 | Digital download | Original | RCA; Sony | |
| Singapore | September 10, 2014 | Digital download | Original | RCA; Sony | |
| Spain | September 10, 2014 | Digital download | Original | RCA; Sony | |
| Sweden | September 10, 2014 | Digital download | Original | RCA; Sony | |
| Switzerland | September 10, 2014 | Digital download | Original | RCA; Sony | |
| United States | September 10, 2014 | Digital download | Original | RCA; Sony | |
| United States | September 23, 2014 | Modern rock radio | Original | RCA; Sony | |
| Australia | November 28, 2014 | Digital download | Original | RCA; Sony | |
| Austria | November 28, 2014 | Digital download | Original | RCA; Sony | |
| Germany | November 28, 2014 | Digital download | Original | RCA; Sony | |
| France | December 1, 2014 | Digital download | Original | RCA; Sony | |
| United States | January 26, 2015 | Hot adult contemporary radio | Original | RCA; Sony | |
| United States | February 10, 2015 | Contemporary hit radio | Original | RCA; Sony | |
| Italy | May 5, 2015 | Contemporary hit radio | Original | RCA; Sony | |
| United Kingdom | May 18, 2015 | Contemporary hit radio | Original | RCA; Sony | |
| United Kingdom | June 7, 2015 | Digital download | Original | RCA; Sony | |
| Austria | July 10, 2015 | CD single | Original | RCA; Sony | |
| Germany | July 10, 2015 | CD single | Original | RCA; Sony | |
| Switzerland | July 10, 2015 | CD single | Original | RCA; Sony | |
| Various | September 4, 2015 | Digital download | Acoustic | RCA; Sony | |
| Various | December 22, 2015 | Digital download | White Panda Remix | RCA; Sony | |

== See also ==
- List of best-selling singles in Australia
- List of number-one singles of 2015 (Poland)
- List of Billboard Hot 100 top 10 singles in 2015
- List of number-one Billboard Rock Songs
- List of Billboard Adult Contemporary number ones of 2015
- List of Adult Top 40 number-one songs of the 2010s
- List of number-one Billboard Alternative Songs of 2015
