= Marianas Trench discography =

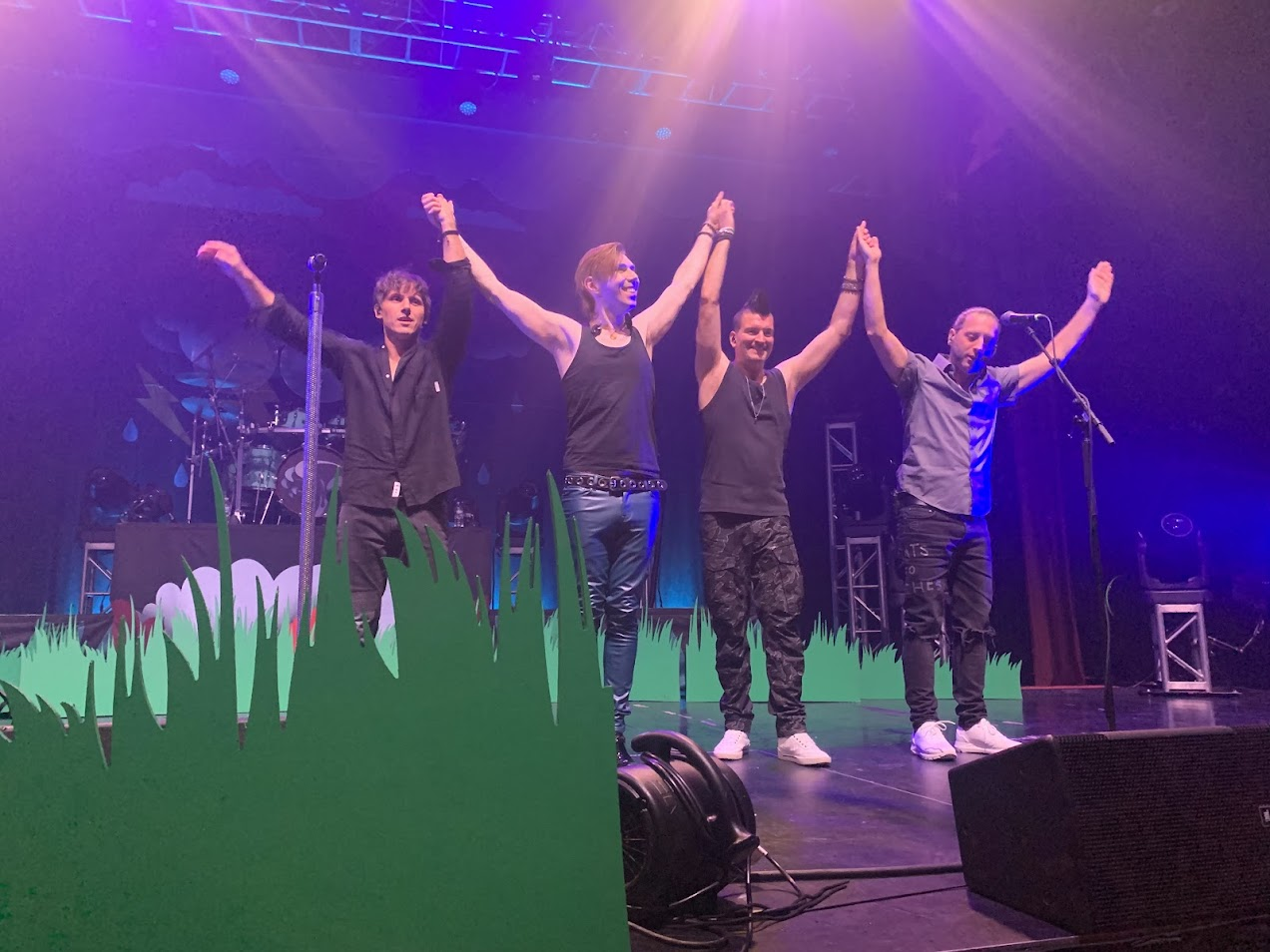
- Marianas Trench in Grand Rapids, Michigan 2024
- Studio albums: 6
- Extended plays: 3
- Singles: 27
- Music videos: 25

Canadian pop rock band Marianas Trench has released six studio albums, three extended plays, 27 singles and 25 music videos.

The band recorded and released their self-titled debut EP in 2002. On October 3, 2006, the band released their debut album, Fix Me. Its first single, "Say Anything" peaked at number three in the Canadian Singles Chart. It was followed by another two singles, "Decided to Break It" and "Shake Tramp".

On February 24, 2009, they released their second studio album, Masterpiece Theatre. The album debuted at number four on the Canadian Albums Chart and was certified platinum in Canada. The album released five singles, including the highest peaked single of the album, "All to Myself", which peaked at number 11. The song as well as "Cross My Heart" were both certified 2× platinum.

The band's third studio album, Ever After, was released on November 21, 2011. The album peaked at number 8 in Canada but also charted in the US in Heatseekers Albums with a peak of number 5 and in Independent Albums with number 48. Its first single, "Haven't Had Enough", peaked at number 9 in Canada. Ever After also released another three singles, "Fallout", "Desperate Measures" and "Stutter".

The band released their fourth studio album, Astoria, on October 23, 2015. Its release was preceded by the promotion of two buzz singles – "Pop 101" and "Here's to the Zeros" – from their extended play, Something Old / Something New. The album's lead single, "One Love", was released September 14, 2015.

The group released their fifth studio album, Phantoms, on March 1, 2019. They released four singles in promotion of the album: "I Knew You When", "Only the Lonely Survive", "Glimmer" and "Don't Miss Me?".

The band released their sixth studio album, Haven, on August 30, 2024. They released four singles in promotion of the album, "A Normal Life", "Lightning and Thunder", "I'm Not Getting Better" and "Down to You".

== Albums ==
=== Studio albums ===
List of albums, with selected chart positions and certifications
| Title | Album details | Peak chart positions | | | | | Sales | Certifications |
| Title | Album details | CAN | AUS | US | US Heat | US Indie | Sales | Certifications |
|---|---|---|---|---|---|---|---|---|
| Fix Me | Released: October 3, 2006; Label: 604; Format: CD, DL | 90 | — | — | — | — | CAN: 35,000 | MC: Gold |
| Masterpiece Theatre | Released: February 24, 2009; Label: 604; Format: CD, DL, LP | 4 | — | — | — | — | CAN: 5,000 | MC: 3× Platinum |
| Ever After | Released: November 21, 2011; Label: 604, Universal; Format: CD, DL, LP | 8 | — | — | 5 | 48 | | MC: 3× Platinum |
| Astoria | Released: October 23, 2015; Label: 604, Cherrytree, Interscope; Format: CD, CS, DL, LP | 2 | 56 | 53 | — | — | | MC: Platinum |
| Phantoms | Released: March 1, 2019; Label: 604; Format: CD, DL, LP | 4 | — (Note: Phantoms did not enter the ARIA Top 100 Albums Chart, but peaked at number 23 on the ARIA Digital Album Chart.) | — (Note: Phantoms did not enter the Billboard 200, but peaked at number 38 on the Top Album Sales component chart.) | — | 7 | | |
| Haven | Released: August 30, 2024; Label: 604; Formats: CD, DL | 87 | — | — | — | — | | |
"—" denotes albums that did not chart or was not released to that territory.

=== Live albums ===
List of live albums
| Title | Album details |
|---|---|
| Live at the Rave Milwaukee | Released: June 17, 2022; Label: 604; Format: DL |

=== Extended plays ===
| Title | Album details | Peak chart positions |
| Title | Album details | US Heat |
|---|---|---|
| Marianas Trench | Released: November 2, 2002; Label: 604; Format: CD, DL | — |
| Face the Music | Released: May 10, 2013; Label: 604, Cherrytree, Interscope; Format: CD, DL | 43 |
| Something Old / Something New | Released: May 26, 2015; Label: 604, Cherrytree, Interscope; Format: DL, 7" vinyl | — |
"—" denotes albums that did not chart.

== Singles ==
List of singles, with selected chart positions and certifications, showing year released and album name
| Title | Year | Peak chart positions | | | | | Certifications | Album |
| Title | Year | CAN | CAN AC | CAN CHR | CAN HAC | US Adult | Certifications | Album |
|---|---|---|---|---|---|---|---|---|
| "Say Anything" | 2006 | 3 | — | — | — | — | | Fix Me |
| "Decided to Break It" | 2006 | 14 | — | — | — | — | | Fix Me |
| "Shake Tramp" | 2007 | 65 | — | 25 | — | — | MC: Platinum | Fix Me |
| "Cross My Heart" | 2008 | 15 | — | 11 | 12 | — | MC: 3× Platinum | Masterpiece Theatre |
| "All to Myself" | 2009 | 11 | — | 8 | 12 | — | MC: 3× Platinum | Masterpiece Theatre |
| "Beside You" | 2009 | 27 | 32 | 15 | 11 | — | MC: 2× Platinum | Masterpiece Theatre |
| "Celebrity Status" | 2010 | 24 | — | 12 | 17 | — | MC: 2× Platinum | Masterpiece Theatre |
| "Good to You" (featuring Kate Voegele or Jessica Lee) | 2010 | 38 | 49 | 22 | 14 | — | MC: 2× Platinum | Masterpiece Theatre |
| "Haven't Had Enough" | 2011 | 9 | 34 | 24 | 13 | — | MC: 3× Platinum | Ever After |
| "Fallout" | 2011 | 26 | 37 | 19 | 11 | — | MC: 3× Platinum | Ever After |
| "Desperate Measures" | 2012 | 20 | — | 17 | 9 | — | MC: 3× Platinum | Ever After |
| "Stutter" | 2012 | 28 | 37 | 20 | 13 | — | MC: 3× Platinum | Ever After |
| "By Now" | 2013 | 50 | — | 26 | 14 | — | MC: Gold | Ever After |
| "Pop 101" (Barely) (feat. Anami Vice) | 2014 | 27 | — | 23 | 11 | — | MC: Platinum | Something Old / Something New |
| "Here's to the Zeros" | 2014 | 59 | — | 23 | 25 | — | MC: Platinum | Something Old / Something New |
| "One Love" | 2015 | 50 | 14 | 20 | 16 | 35 | MC: Platinum | Astoria |
| "This Means War" | 2016 | — | 38 | 37 | 38 | — | | Astoria |
| "Who Do You Love" | 2016 | 56 | 15 | 31 | 9 | — | MC: 2× Platinum | Astoria |
| "Rhythm of Your Heart" | 2017 | — (Note: "Rhythm of Your Heart" did not enter the Canadian Hot 100, but peaked at number 23 on the Canadian Digital Song Sales component chart.) | 14 | 39 | 9 | — | | Non-album single |
| "I Knew You When" | 2018 | — (Note: "I Knew You When" did not enter the Canadian Hot 100, but peaked at number 18 on the Canadian Digital Song Sales component chart.) | 33 | 27 | 21 | — | | Phantoms |
| "Only the Lonely Survive" | 2019 | — | — | — | — | — | | Phantoms |
| "Glimmer" | 2019 | — | — | — | — | — | | Phantoms |
| "Don't Miss Me?" | 2019 | — | — | — | — | — | | Phantoms |
| "A Normal Life" | 2024 | — | — | — | — | — | | Haven |
| "Lightning and Thunder" | 2024 | — | — | 38 | 11 | — | | Haven |
| "I'm Not Getting Better" | 2024 | — | — | — | — | — | | Haven |
| "Down to You" | 2024 | — | — | — | — | — | | Haven |
"—" denotes a recording that did not chart or was not released to that territory. Singles above "Shake Tramp" charted on the Canadian Singles Chart.

=== Promotional singles ===
List of promotional singles, showing year released and album name
| Title | Year | Album |
|---|---|---|
| "Fix Me" | 2007 | Fix Me |
| "Perfect" | 2009 | Masterpiece Theatre |
| "Feeling Small" | 2009 | Fix Me |
| "Primetime" | 2015 | Something Old / Something New |
| "Sicker Things" | 2015 | Something Old / Something New |
| "Wildfire" | 2015 | Astoria |
| "Echoes of You" | 2019 | Phantoms |

== Other charted songs ==
List of songs that charted, but were not officially released as a single
| Title | Year | Peak chart positions | Album |
| Title | Year | CAN | Album |
|---|---|---|---|
| "Ever After" | 2011 | 70 | Ever After |

== Videography ==
=== Video albums ===
| Title | Album details |
|---|---|
| Masterpiece Theatre: Director's Cut | Released: November 30, 2010; Label: 604; Format: CD+DVD-V, DL |

=== Music videos ===
| Year | Song | Director(s) | Ref. |
|---|---|---|---|
| 2006 | "Say Anything" | Kyle Davison and Brendan Steacy | |
| 2006 | "Decided to Break It" | Kyle Davison and Chris Sargent | |
| 2007 | "Shake Tramp" | Kyle Davison and Chris Sargent | |
| 2008 | "Cross My Heart" | Colin Minihan and Tony Mirza | |
| 2009 | "All to Myself" | Colin Minihan and Tony Mirza | |
| 2009 | "Beside You" | RT! | |
| 2010 | "Celebrity Status" | Colin Minihan and Tony Mirza | |
| 2010 | "Good to You" (featuring Jessica Lee) | Colin Minihan | |
| 2011 | "Haven't Had Enough" | Kyle Davison | |
| 2012 | "Fallout" | Kyle Davison | |
| 2012 | "Desperate Measures" | Kyle Davison | |
| 2012 | "Stutter" | Kyle Davison | |
| 2013 | "By Now" | Kyle Davison | |
| 2014 | "POP 101 (Barely)" | Kyle Davison | |
| 2015 | "Here's to the Zeros" | Kyle Davison and Josh Ramsay | |
| 2015 | "One Love" | Kyle Davison | |
| 2016 | "This Means War" | Anthony Chirco | |
| 2016 | "Who Do You Love" | Kyle Davison | |
2017
| 2017 | "Astoria" | Emma Higgins | |
| 2018 | "Rhythm of Your Heart" | Emma Higgins | |
| 2018 | "I Knew You When" | Kyle Davison | |
| 2019 | "Glimmer" | Unknown | |
| 2019 | "Don't Miss Me?" | Unknown | |
| 2020 | "Only the Lonely Survive" | Unknown | |
| 2024 | "Lightning and Thunder" | Ben Knechtel | |
