= By Now (song) =

Single by Marianas Trench

from the album Ever After
- Released: June 10, 2013
- Genre: Power ballad
- Length: 4:14
- Label: 604
- Songwriter: Josh Ramsay
- Producer: Ramsay

Marianas Trench singles chronology
"Stutter" (2012)	"By Now" (2013)	"Pop 101" (2014)

Music video
- "By Now" on YouTube

"By Now" is a song by Canadian pop rock band Marianas Trench. It was first released on November 8, 2011, as a promotional single for a free download to people who pre-ordered the Deluxe Edition of Ever After on iTunes. The song was serviced to contemporary hit radio on June 10, 2013, as the fifth and final single.

== Background and composition ==
"By Now" was written and produced by Josh Ramsay. The song has been described as a power ballad track.

== Music video ==
A teaser for "By Now" was released on June 12, 2013. The official music video debuted on July 12, at the Molson Amphitheatre in Toronto. It later premiered on August 1, via MuchMusic. The video ends the story of Ever After, tying all of the videos for "Haven't Had Enough", "Fallout", "Desperate Measures", and "Stutter" together. The video portrays Josh Ramsay getting caught up in his love for the leading female, Darla Taylor, and getting lost in the world of sex, drugs, alcohol, and stealing money from the rest of the band. The video also includes scenes of car chases, fighting, and murder.

According to drummer Ian Casselman, the video was inspired by Romeo and Juliet and the 1993 film True Romance, stating they "tried to take a serious approach and make it look more like movie footage [...] It's a very artsy stab at it [and] it's not the typical fairy-tale story approach." Filmed in Las Vegas, the video was directed by Kyle Davison.

== Chart performance ==
"By Now" debuted and peaked at number 50 on the Canadian Hot 100 on the week of November 26, 2011, before it was officially released as a single on June 10, 2013, and spent 17 weeks on the chart. The song was certified gold by Music Canada in April 2014.

== Charts ==
Chart performance for "By Now"
Chart (2011–13)	Peak position
Canada (Canadian Hot 100)	50
Canada CHR/Top 40 (Billboard)	26
Canada Hot AC (Billboard)	14

== Certifications ==
Certifications and sales for "By Now"
Region	Certification	Certified units/sales
Canada (Music Canada)	Gold	40,000^{*}
^{*} Sales figures based on certification alone.

== Release history ==
Release dates and formats for "By Now"
Region	Date	Format	Label	Ref.
Various	November 8, 2011	Digital download	604 Records	
Canada	June 10, 2013	Contemporary hit radio	604 Records	
