= Haven (Marianas Trench album) =

2024 album by Marianas Trench

Studio album by Marianas Trench
- Released: August 30, 2024
- Recorded: July 2022 – July 2024
- Genre: Pop rock; pop punk; glam rock; symphonic rock
- Length: 52:50
- Label: 604; Warner Music Canada
- Producer: Josh Ramsay

Marianas Trench chronology
| Phantoms (2019) | Haven (2024) |

Singles from Haven
- 1. "A Normal Life" Released: April 26, 2024; 2. "Lightning and Thunder" Released: May 24, 2024; 3. "I'm Not Getting Better" Released: July 12, 2024; 4. "Down To You" Released: August 16, 2024

Haven is the sixth studio album by Canadian pop rock band Marianas Trench. The album was released on August 30, 2024, via 604 Records. The group released four singles prior to the album's release, "A Normal Life", "Lightning and Thunder", "I'm Not Getting Better" and "Down to You".

== Background ==
After spending the last year touring across Canada, including performances at the Calgary Stampede and Malkin Bowl, the group headed to the studio in July 2022, to begin working on their sixth studio album. By September 2022, the group had completed one song and continued working on another five. Much like their previous releases, Haven is a concept album, drawing inspiration from Joseph Campbell's The Hero's Journey. Lead vocalist Josh Ramsay began garnering ideas for Haven while he was writing his debut solo studio album, The Josh Ramsay Show in 2022. Following a deep dive into the book, Ramsay was "in awe" of how much the idea applied to every story. Ramsay used one of the plot points in the story, Campbell's observation in every hero's journey, to guide each track. In addition to the album's concept, it is also an autobiographical album to Ramsay. Lead guitarist Matt Webb stated that the group set a goal to one-up themselves on this record and pushed to incorporate a "high gain, high energy, unfiltered and unapologetic" Marianas Trench sound.

"We have grown so much during the making of this record, yet together in a room, creating and listening to music, we go backwards. We feel (and act) just like kids. Life is blissful and turbulent, but when we are together, it's safe. It's Haven. We hope you hear and feel it the same way we do."

As well as being inspired by The Hero's Journey, the album was influenced by "all walks of life." The band wanted to have a deep emotional feel and evoke "real inner struggles" on the album. According to Ramsay, he had seen plot lines of The Hero's Journey featured in literature and films, but never in music, which resulted in going "back to the drawing board" on this album more times than their previous records. He also felt that the process was "significantly more ambitious than he'd anticipated."

== Composition ==
Haven contains 13 tracks, all written and produced by Ramsay. The album features layers of synthesizers, as well as additional contributions from the Vancouver Film Orchestra conducted by Hal Beckett. According to bassist Mike Ayley, the band wanted the album to have "a cinematic kind of feel," adding in lots of guitar and orchestral sounds. Ayley also added that there are hidden references to their old songs and melodies as the album progresses. The opening track, "A Normal Life" has a run time of nearly seven minutes is described as glam rock and progressive rock. Ramsay wanted the song to "be as bold as possible" and ambitious. The lyrics of the song explain the "feeling like you don't belong in your place in life and knowing you were meant for something more." "Down to You" is a symphonic rock track, drawing similarities to the group's earlier work such as Masterpiece Theatre and Ever After. "Lightning and Thunder" was written about Ramsay finding out that he and his wife were going to have their first child, with the main message being "a call to adventure." "I'm Not Getting Better" is a blend of pop punk, dancepop and synthpop. The song is a reflection on self-doubt and overcoming life's obstacles, corresponding to "the third plot point featured in The Hero's Journey." The ninth track, "Turn and Run" ends in a crescendo, reminiscent of the title track from their third studio album, Ever After. "Worlds Collide" is a piano driven track and references old material from their second studio album, Masterpiece Theatre. The album's closing track "Haven", was compared to their fourth studio album, Astoria's last track, "End of an Era", making references to their earlier work.

== Release ==
On April 26, 2024, the group released the first single from the album and their first song since 2019, "A Normal Life". On May 24, "Lightning and Thunder" was released as the album's second single. The song peaked at number 38 on the Canada CHR/Top 40 and number 22 on the Canada Hot AC chart. On July 12, the group released "I'm Not Getting Better" as the third single from the album. On July 23, the group premiered the music video for "Lightning and Thunder" via VEVO and was directed by Ben Knechtel. On July 26, the group announced their sixth studio album, Haven, released on August 30, 2024, via 604 Records and Warner Music Canada. Originally scheduled for release in February 2024, the album's release date was pushed back by six months, due to events occurring in Ramsay's life. On August 16, the band release the album's fourth single, "Down to You".

Following the release of Haven, the group released a handful of pseudo/music videos for the songs, "Stand and Fight", "Remember Me By", "Nights Like These" and "Turn and Run". A lyric video for the title track premiered on April 4, 2025. A live version of "Nights Like These" was released as a single on April 25.

== Promotion ==
On May 28, the band announced the Force of Nature Tour. In support of the album's release, it began in September and features support from Cassadee Pope and Grayscale in the US and LØLØ in Canada, among others. On August 21, the band hosted an exclusive premiere of Haven in Toronto, performing the songs on the album live for the first time for fans who attended the event. The group embarked on an Australian tour in June 2025. A fall leg of the band's Force of Nature tour will be supported by the Summer Set from September to October 2025.

== Critical reception ==
Professional ratings
Review scores
| Source | Rating |
|---|---|
| Earmilk | 4/5 stars |
| Melodic | 5/5 stars |
| New Noise Magazine | 5/5 stars |
| The Spill Magazine | 8/10 |

Haven was met with positive reviews from music critics. Nick Anastasia of Melodic stated that the album, "feels like the spiritual successor to 2011's magical Ever After... the 80's inspired sound of 2015's Astoria is highly present (particularly on some of the uptempo number), Phantoms dark moodiness is much more prominent, as is the more rock inspired sound from 2009's breakout, Masterpiece Theatre. Overall, Ramsay and the guys have managed to fuse the sounds of the best of their work and harnessed it into the powerhouse album that is Haven. Stuart Derdeyn of Vancouver Sun noted, "From the Queen-like vocal flights in 'Into the Storm' and the surprisingly Toto-ish pulse of 'Ancient History' or rousing balladry of 'Nights Like These', it's clear that an incredible amount of time was devoted to shaping the final results."

Zee Caine of New Noise Magazine remarked, "The album mixes a brilliant feel reminiscent of their previous work with a more grown-up feel. It demonstrates how they have grown as musicians and it'll leave their fans wanting even more from them. Despite the lengthy time between albums, their sound has not changed all that much, but the content of the lyrics, definitely has a more mature tone to it."

Mercedes Chircop of The Spill Magazine gave a positive review for the album, stating "Their ability to paint vivid imagery with both music and lyrics is what sets this album apart... Josh Ramsay's signature raspy scream makes a powerful appearance, adding that raw emotion fans have come to love. The band's trademark harmonizing vocals are on full display, creating those lush, layered soundscapes that elevate every track."

Raniel Santos of Earmilk called the album their "best work," stating that "Marianas Trench still has enough magic up their sleeve to sustain them for years to come. Their adaptation of The Hero’s Journey is faithfully executed and granted a personal touch, showing the Canadian quartet is willing and able to adapt their signature blend of pop and symphonic rock to fit multiple kinds of stories."

== Track listing ==
All tracks are written by Josh Ramsay.

| No. | Title | Length |
|---|---|---|
| 1. | "A Normal Life" | 6:51 |
| 2. | "Lightning And Thunder" | 3:25 |
| 3. | "I'm Not Getting Better" | 2:48 |
| 4. | "Down To You" | 2:28 |
| 5. | "Now Or Never" | 3:08 |
| 6. | "Into The Storm" | 4:00 |
| 7. | "Ancient History" | 2:48 |
| 8. | "Stand And Fight" | 3:17 |
| 9. | "Turn And Run" | 3:34 |
| 10. | "Worlds Collide" | 5:26 |
| 11. | "Nights Like These" | 2:50 |
| 12. | "Remember Me By" | 3:45 |
| 13. | "Haven" | 8:30 |
| Total length: | | 52:50 |

== Personnel ==
Marianas Trench

- Josh Ramsay – vocals, rhythm guitar
- Matt Webb – lead guitar, backing vocals
- Mike Ayley – bass, backing vocals
- Ian Casselman – drums, backing vocals

Production

- Josh Ramsay – producer, engineering, mixing
- Dave Ogilvie – mixing (track 2, 5–11, 13)

== Charts ==
Chart performance for Haven
| Chart (2024) | Peak position |
|---|---|
| Canadian Albums (Billboard) | 87 |

== Release history ==
Release dates and formats for Haven
| Region | Date | Format(s) | Label | Ref. |
|---|---|---|---|---|
| Canada | August 30, 2024 | CD; digital download | 604; Warner Music Canada | |
| Various | August 30, 2024 | Digital download | 604 | |
