= Face the Music (EP) =

EP by Marianas Trench
- Released: May 10, 2013
- Genre: Pop rock; alternative rock
- Length: 14:58
- Label: 604; Cherrytree; Interscope
- Producer: Josh Ramsay

Marianas Trench chronology
Ever After (2011)	Face the Music (2013)	Something Old / Something New (2015)

Face the Music: The EP (also known as Face the Music) is the title of the second extended play released by Canadian pop-rock group Marianas Trench. Featuring popular songs from the group's most recent album, Ever After (2011), the EP marks Marianas Trench's first official US music release. It was first released May 10, 2013, in New Zealand before being released in North America later that month, and was distributed through 604 Records, Cherrytree Records, and Interscope Records.

== Background ==
Marianas Trench was signed to Cherrytree and Interscope Records in April 2013, who would handle their releases outside of Canada while 604 Records continued to handle Canadian publications. The group then released a four-track EP titled Face the Music on May 10, 2013, in New Zealand. It was released in North America on May 14.

== Critical reception ==
Professional ratings
Review scores
Source	Rating
Alter the Press!	3.5/5 stars
Confront Magazine	4/5 stars
Melodic	4/5 stars

Alter the Press! rated the EP 3.5 stars out of 5, with reviewer Cara Friedman writing that the record is "worth it just for the two acoustic versions," as they are "the most unique" and a possibly-unexpected change of pace from the pop and electronic influences of their studio recordings. Allison Sternall of Confront Magazine was also positive, giving the EP a 4/5 rating. She noted that the tracks chosen "showcase [the band's] ability to create a great radio hit," but also felt the record could have benefited from the inclusion of a slower ballad to give listeners a "better-rounded introduction to the band's music as a whole." Johan Wippsson rewarded the EP a 4 out of 5 stars, stating, "it's nice to see that the band also manages the more stripped-down style [...] they are really, really cool when they show off their more progressive side like a young and modern Queen and hope they continue in this direction."

== Track listing ==
All tracks are written by Josh Ramsay.

No.	Title	Length
1.	"Desperate Measures"	3:45
2.	"Haven't Had Enough"	3:31
3.	"Haven't Had Enough" (Acoustic version)	3:30
4.	"Fallout" (Acoustic version)	4:12
Total length:		14:58

== Charts ==
Chart performance for Face the Music
Chart (2013)	Peak position
US Heatseekers Albums (Billboard)	43

== Release history ==
Release dates and formats for Face the Music
Region	Date	Format	Label	Ref.
New Zealand	May 10, 2013	Digital download	Interscope Records	
United States	May 14, 2013	Digital download, CD	Interscope Records, Cherrytree Records	
Canada	May 14, 2013	CD	Interscope Records, 604 Records	
Canada	May 17, 2013	Digital download	Interscope Records, 604 Records	
