= All to Myself =

All to Myself may refer to:

- "All to Myself" (Marianas Trench song)
- "All to Myself" (Guy Sebastian song)
- "All to Myself" (Dan + Shay song)
- "All to Myself" (Future, Metro Boomin and the Weeknd song)
- All to Myself, by Jonathan Coulton from Solid State
