= Fix Me (album) =

2006 studio album by Marianas Trench

Studio album by Marianas Trench
- Released: October 3, 2006
- Recorded: 2005–06
- Studios: Mushroom Studios (Vancouver); The Umbrella Factory (Richmond); The Warehouse Studio (Vancouver)
- Genres: Hard rock; pop punk; emo pop
- Length: 39:09
- Label: 604
- Producers: Dave Genn; Marianas Trench

Marianas Trench chronology
Marianas Trench (2002)	Fix Me (2006)	Masterpiece Theatre (2009)

Singles from Fix Me
- 1. "Say Anything" Released: June 13, 2006; 2. "Decided to Break It" Released: October 3, 2006; 3. "Shake Tramp" Released: September 2007

Fix Me is the debut studio album by Canadian rock band Marianas Trench, released on October 3, 2006. Released through 604 Records, the album was produced by the band and Dave Genn. The album is supported by three singles: "Say Anything", "Decided to Break It" and "Shake Tramp".

== Background ==
Before the band formed, lead singer Josh Ramsay began recording demos for Fix Me in a studio his parents owned. He soon sent them out to people in hopes "to get stuff happening." It caught the attention of 604 Records co-founder Jonathan Simkin, who liked the material, but told Ramsay he needed "a good producer" and offered to help him find one. The band also formed in 1999, under the name Ramsay Fiction. After the band experienced a couple of line-up changes, they solidified their line-up in 2001, consisting of Ramsay on lead vocals and guitar, Matt Webb as the lead guitarist, Mike Ayley as the bassist and Ian Casselman as the drummer, renaming the group Marianas Trench. The band became acquainted with producer Jim Vallance, and though he did not produce the album, he gave Ramsay some advice on songwriting and for their careers in general. On January 8, 2003, it was announced the band had signed to Nickelback frontman Chad Kroeger's 604 Records label.

The album reflects the drug addiction struggle of lead vocalist Josh Ramsay. Many of the songs references self-mutilation, such as "Say Anything", which Ramsay described as "metaphorical." Other songs contains themes of disappointment and self-loathe, like "Decided to Break It". "Say Anything" was posted online on March 6, 2006. On August 30, the group announced that Fix Me would be released on October 3.

The album was recorded at Factory Studios and Mushroom Studios in Vancouver and at The Umbrella Factory in Richmond, British Columbia. The album was engineered and mixed by Mike Fraser while production was handled by the band themselves and by Dave Genn.

Fix Me peaked at number 90 on the Canadian Albums Chart and managed to sell 35,000 copies in Canada. The album was certified Gold by Music Canada in April 2014.

== Singles ==
"Say Anything" was released as the lead single from the album on June 13, 2006. The song peaked at number three on the Canadian Singles Chart. "Decided to Break It" was released on October 3, 2006, as the album's second single. The song reached number 14 on the Canadian Singles Chart. "Shake Tramp" was released in September 2007, as the third single from the album and peaked at number 65 on the Canadian Hot 100.

== Critical reception ==
Professional ratings
Review scores
Source	Rating
AllMusic	3/5 stars
Alternative Addiction	3.5/5 stars
Jam!	3/5 stars
Melodic	4/5 stars

Fix Me was received with generally positive reviews. Matthew Chisling of AllMusic gave the album a mixed review stating, "their first album is more generic and radio-ready than its follow-ups, which are often quirky and catchy." Alternative Addiction called the album, "an original blend of raw hard rock, pop and punk with the odd twist for good measure." Darryl Sterdan of Jam! praised tracks such as "Shake Tramp" and "Vertigo", comparing it to the likes of Nirvana and Queen. Despite criticizing the album's predictability, he said "Marianas Trench can be interesting enough to escape the valley of pop-punk cliches." Kaj Roth of Melodic gave a positive review for the album. He called the eighth track, "Far From Home" as the standout song on the album and complimented the seventh track "Push" for its catchiness.

== Accolades ==
"Shake Tramp" became the group's breakout hit, helping them break into the mainstream. The song was nominated for Juno Video of the Year and won the SOCAN No. 1 Song Award. The band was also nominated for Best New Group/Solo Artist of the Year at the Canadian Radio Music Awards.

== Track listing ==
All tracks are written by Josh Ramsay, except "Push", written by Josh Ramsay and Steve Marshall.

Standard edition
No.	Title	Length
1.	"Say Anything"	3:49
2.	"Decided to Break It"	2:23
3.	"September"	3:41
4.	"Alibis"	3:59
5.	"Shake Tramp"	3:34
6.	"Low"	4:15
7.	"Push"	3:23
8.	"Far From Here"	3:19
9.	"Vertigo"	3:19
10.	"Alive Again"	3:26
11.	"Skin & Bones"	3:55

iTunes Bonus Track
No.	Title	Length
12.	"Fix Me"	3:56

== Personnel ==
Credits for Fix Me adapted from AllMusic.

Marianas Trench

- Josh Ramsay – lead vocals, guitar, piano, production
- Matt Webb – guitar, vocals, piano, production
- Mike Ayley – bass guitar, vocals, production
- Ian Casselman – drums, percussion, vocals, production

Production

- Rebecca Blissett – cover photo
- Mike Cashin – assistant engineer
- Mike Fraser – mixing
- Dave Genn – engineer, keyboard programming, producer, string arrangements
- Laura Hasthorpe – viola
- George Marino – mastering
- Mark Maryanovich – layout design, photography
- Jonathan Simkin – A&R
- John Stamos – guitar technician
- Scott Ternan – engineer
- Sheldon Zaharko – string engineer

== Charts ==
Chart performance for Fix Me
Chart (2007)	Peak position
Canadian Albums (Nielsen SoundScan)	90
Canadian Alternative Albums (Nielsen)	34

== Certifications ==
Certifications and sales for Fix Me
Region	Certification	Certified units/sales
Canada (Music Canada)	Gold	5,000^{^}
^{^} Shipments figures based on certification alone.

== Marianas Trench EP ==
Marianas Trench

EP by Marianas Trench
- Released: 2002
- Recorded: 2001
- Genres: Rock; pop rock
- Length: 27:01
- Label: 604 Records
- Producer: Warne Livesay

Marianas Trench chronology
Marianas Trench (2002)	Fix Me (2006)

Professional ratings
Review scores
Source	Rating
Melodic	3.5/5 stars

Marianas Trench is the first extended play recorded by Marianas Trench. All eight tracks were eventually re-released in studio recordings — "Decided to Break It", "Push", "Far From Here", and "Push You Up" (re-recorded under the title "Skin & Bones") were all re-recorded for their debut studio album, Fix Me (2006); "Fix Me" and "Feeling Small" were released as standalone B-side promotional singles on iTunes in 2007 and 2009, respectively; and "Primetime and "Sicker Things" were released alongside two then-new songs as the Something Old / Something New EP in 2015.

=== Critical reception ===
Kaj Roth called the EP a strong debut describing it as "interesting and fresh." He praised the group members vocals and harmonies stating, "All 5 band members sing and their 5 way harmonies are amazing."

=== Track listing ===
All tracks are written by Josh Ramsay.

No.	Title	Length
1.	"Primetime"	3:21
2.	"Decided To Break It"	2:23
3.	"Push You Up"	3:23
4.	"Far From Here"	3:19
5.	"Sicker Things"	3:39
6.	"Feeling Small"	3:36
7.	"Fix Me"	3:56
8.	"Push"	3:23
