= Lord Byng Secondary School =

Secondary school in Vancouver, British Columbia

Location
- 3939 West 16th Avenue; Vancouver, British Columbia, V5R 3C9; Canada; 49°15′31″N 123°11′31″W

Information
- School type: Public, high school
- Motto: Custos Morum (Latin) ("Guardian of Morals")
- Founded: 1925
- School board: School District 39 Vancouver
- Superintendent: Helen McGregor
- Area trustee: Lois Chan-Pedley
- School number: 03939038
- Principal: Krista Ediger
- Grades: 8–12
- Enrollment: 1,497 (2025-2026)
- Capacity: 1,200
- Language: English
- Area: West Point Grey
- Colours: Scarlet and grey
- Team name: Grey Ghosts
- Public transit access: 7, 25, 33
- Website: byng.vsb.bc.ca
- Last updated: October 3, 2026

Lord Byng Secondary School is a public secondary school in the West Point Grey neighbourhood on the west side of Vancouver, British Columbia, Canada. The school serves students in grades 8 to 12 and is operated by the Vancouver School Board. As of the 2025–26 school year, it had an enrolment of 1,497 students.

== History ==
Opened in 1925, Lord Byng Secondary School was named in honor of Julian Hedworth George Byng, the Lord Byng of Vimy. A British Army officer and later Governor General of Canada. In 2005, the school underwent seismic upgrades. It also expanded with the addition of a new library, a gymnasium, and multiple gallery studios and classrooms.

== Byng Arts Mini School ==
Lord Byng also offers the Byng Arts program, which has a greater focus on fine arts and is open to small cohort of students. Students can specialize in band, choir, drama, media arts, strings, or visual arts. In 2006, the Byng Arts Mini School student theatre company received national attention when it staged The Laramie Project, which had been banned by the Surrey School Board for its "violence and profanity". The playwright, Moisés Kauffman, visited the school during production and worked with students from the program.

== Music ==
Lord Byng's string ensembles have won numerous awards, including over 25 gold awards at the provincial Kiwanis Festival competition and three gold awards from MusicFest Canada (2005, 2007, 2011). In 2008, the Senior Honour Orchestra placed first in the North West Orchestra Competition in Portland, Oregon. In 2010, both the Junior and Senior Honour Orchestras received gold standing in the Heritage Music Festival in Seattle, Washington. The Senior Honour Orchestra were invited to compete in the 2012 American String Teachers Association National Orchestra Festival in Atlanta, where they placed second against advanced American school orchestras.

In April 2017, the Senior Honour Orchestra competed at World Strides Festival of Golds, California, along with dozens of other orchestras, bands and choirs in North America. They obtained 1st place out of all the other music groups. On May 5 of the same year, both the Senior Honour and a combination of Junior and Intermediate Orchestras competed at the Kiwanis Festival held at Douglas College. Both orchestras obtained 1st place in their respective divisions. In 2025, Lord Byng's senior chamber choir won first place at the Golden Voices of Montserrat choir competition.

== Sports ==
Lord Byng sports clubs are named for their school mascot, the Grey Ghost. Students represent the school in a number of sports including soccer, basketball, volleyball, rugby, ultimate, tennis, badminton, golf, track and field, cross-country, and swimming. The school also offers intramural sports, such as hand-ball.

Lord Byng was won a number of athletic titles, including the cross country team's Team Aggregate Championship award and the Grade 8 Boys Rugby City Championship. They also won the Tier II Senior Girls Basketball City Championships in the 2011–2012 season.

== In popular culture ==
- Students from the Symphony Orchestra were asked to play the accompaniment for the song "Wavin' Flag", a song written by K'Naan for the Haiti Relief Fund. This song features Canadian singers such as Avril Lavigne, Justin Bieber, Hedley, Josh Ramsay from Marianas Trench, Nikki Yanofsky, and more. Lord Byng students took part in both the soundtrack and the music video recording in 2010.
- School's yards were used in the filming of X-Men Origins: Wolverine.
- The school doubles as Rosewood High in Pretty Little Liars and Finnegan High in Mr. Young.
- The school's exterior stood in for a fictional Harding High School in Wisconsin during the second-season premiere of Masters of Horror
- Areas of the school were used in the filming of Hollow Man 2.
- Some students from the band and orchestra of the school were cast as extras in Marianas Trench's "Beside You" music video, which took place in the Chan Centre for the Performing Arts at the University of British Columbia.
- Scenes from the movie Saving Silverman were filmed at the front of Lord Byng.
- School's interior and exterior were used for the Nickelodeon film Swindle.
- The 21 Jump Street episode "God is a Bullet" was filmed in 1989 at Lord Byng. It starred Johnny Depp, Peter DeLuise, Holly Robinson Peete, and Dustin Nguyen.
- Exterior shots of Lord Byng were used as Riverdale High in Riverdale.
- The 1986 film, The Boy Who Could Fly, was filmed at the school.

== Notable alumni ==
Name	Description	Graduation Year	Notes	Citation
Ashleigh Ball	Voice Actress and Musician			
Elizabeth Ball	Former Vancouver city councillor			
Grimes	Musician			
Jay Worthy	Rapper			
Joey Cramer	Actor			
Dan Mangan	Musician			
Terry Clarke	Jazz drummer			
Stan Douglas	Installation artist			
Barry Downs	Architect			
Allan Graves	Canadian-American bridge player, Senior World Bridge Champion, Canadian Bridge Hall of Fame			
Marcus Haber	Soccer player			
Chris Haddock	Screenwriter			
Cory Lee	Pop singer			
Chris Mears	Baseball player, former Major League Baseball player and Olympian			
Shaone Morrisonn	Hockey player for the Buffalo Sabres of the National Hockey League			
Joyce Murray	Liberal MP for Vancouver Quadra			
Eric Nicol	Writer			
Phil Nimmons	Jazz clarinetist, composer, bandleader, and academic			
Carly Pope	Actress, co-star of Young People Fucking			
Ross Rebagliati	Snowboarder, first Canadian to win an Olympic gold medal for snowboarding			
Doreen Patterson Reitsma	Naval Pioneer, the first woman from British Columbia to enlist in the postwar Women's Division of the Royal Canadian Navy		Attended both Lord Byng and Point Grey Secondary School	
Shannon Smith	Swimmer and freestyle record holder, 1976 Montreal Olympic bronze medalist in the 400-meter freestyle.			
Cobie Smulders	Actress, known for playing Robin in How I Met Your Mother	2000	Voted “Most Respected” by her classmates	
