= Say Anything (Marianas Trench song) =

Single by Marianas Trench

from the album Fix Me
- Released: June 13, 2006
- Genre: Pop rock
- Length: 3:49
- Label: 604
- Songwriter: Josh Ramsay
- Producer: Dave Genn

Marianas Trench singles chronology
"Say Anything" (2006)	"Decided to Break It" (2006)

Music video
- "Say Anything" on YouTube

"Say Anything" is the debut single by Canadian pop rock band Marianas Trench. It was released on June 13, 2006, as the lead single from their debut studio album Fix Me. The song peaked at number three on the Canadian Singles Chart.

== Background and composition ==
"Say Anything" was written by Josh Ramsay and was produced by Dave Genn. Ramsay described the track as "metaphorical."

"It's sad that someone can be in a situation where they feel so threatened or the textbook layout would be that they 'feel so numb so that they're cutting themselves so that they can feel anything,' and I can definitely relate, because I think that once you look at it, everyone has their own masochistic tendencies, regardless of whether they’re physical or not."

The track runs at 179 BPM and is in the key of G# major. The band performed the song on the American science fiction television series, Kyle XY.

== Release ==
"Say Anything" was first released on the band's Myspace page on March 6, 2006. The song was released as a single to digital retail music stores on June 13, 2006. The song was later released as a CD single on July 24, 2006.

== Music video ==
The music video for "Say Anything" was released in 2006. The video depicts scenes of flash dancing, tea parties with stuffed animals, modeling, and black mail. The music video was directed by Kyle Davison and Brendan Steacy.

== Track listing ==
Digital download
No.	Title	Length
1.	"Say Anything"	3:49
2.	"Shake Tramp"	3:35
3.	"Feeling Small"	3:27

CD single
No.	Title	Length
1.	"Say Anything" (radio edit)	3:56
2.	"Say Anything" (album version)	3:49

== Personnel ==
Credits for "Say Anything" adapted from album's liner notes.

Marianas Trench

- Josh Ramsay — lead vocals, rhythm guitar
- Matt Webb — lead guitar, backing vocals
- Mike Ayley — bass guitar, backing vocals
- Ian Casselman — drums, backing vocals

Production

- Mike Fraser — mixing, engineering
- Dave Genn — producer

== Charts ==
Chart performance for "Say Anything"
Chart (2006)	Peak position
Canadian Singles Chart (Nielsen Soundscan)	3

== Release history ==
Region	Date	Format	Label	Ref.
Canada	June 13, 2006	Digital download	604 Records	
Canada	July 24, 2006	CD	604 Records	
