= Cross My Heart (Marianas Trench song) =

Single by Marianas Trench

from the album Masterpiece Theatre
- Released: November 24, 2008
- Genre: Pop punk
- Length: 3:12
- Label: 604
- Songwriter(s): Josh Ramsay
- Producer(s): Dave Genn

Marianas Trench singles chronology
"Shake Tramp" (2007)	"Cross My Heart" (2008)	"All to Myself" (2008)

Music video
- "Cross My Heart" on YouTube

"Cross My Heart" is a song by Canadian pop rock band Marianas Trench. It was released on November 24, 2008, as the lead single from their second studio album Masterpiece Theatre. An acoustic version of the song was released on March 10, 2009. The song peaked at number 15 on the Canadian Hot 100 and was certified triple-platinum by Music Canada.

== Release ==
The group premiered a new track, "Cross My Heart" on their MySpace on November 14, 2008. The song was later released as the official lead single from their second studio album on November 24.

== Composition ==
"Cross My Heart" was written by lead singer Josh Ramsay and produced by Dave Genn. The song runs at 164 BPM and is in the key of D major. According to bassist Mike Ayley, the group was on the road when Ramsay wrote the song in the back of their van. Lyrically, he said the track was "fairly as it seems."

== Chart performance ==
The song debuted at number 54 on the Canadian Hot 100 for the week ending January 3, 2009. The song dropped out of the chart after three weeks, before re-entering at number 42 and was the "Best Comeback" on the January 31 issue on the Canadian Hot 100. It earned the "Sales Gainer" on the February 21 issue on the Canadian Hot 100 where it peaked at number 15.

== Awards and nominations ==
Awards and nominations for "Cross My Heart"
Year	Organization	Award	Result	Ref(s)
2009	MuchMusic Video Awards	Favourite Canadian Video	Nominated	
2009	MuchMusic Video Awards	MUCH LOUD Rock Video of the Year	Nominated	
2009	MuchMusic Video Awards	UR Fave Video	Nominated	
2009	MuchMusic Video Awards	Director of the Year	Won	
2010	Independent Music Awards	Astral Media Radio Favourite Single	Won	
2010	Independent Music Awards	Favourite Video	Won	

=== Accolades ===
Publication	Country	Accolade	Year	Rank	Ref(s)
Alternative Addiction	United States	Song of the Year	2009	35	

== Music video ==
The music video was released in December 2008, and was directed by Colin Minihan. It reached within the top 3 on the MuchMusic Countdown. The video was the fifth most played video in Canada in 2009.

Shot in Vancouver, Canada, the music video starts off with Josh Ramsay singing to a woman that he is following throughout the course of the video. While going down the street, a parade with the rest of the band playing on a float is seen throughout the video. In the end, the woman being followed takes out her headphones, and hears Josh singing to her. She turns around and sees the crowd cheering and applauding to her. She invites him in, the song ends and the crowd stops cheering.

== Track listing ==
CD single
No.	Title	Length
1.	"Cross My Heart"	3:12
2.	"Cross My Heart" (music video)	3:25

Digital download
No.	Title	Length
1.	"Cross My Heart"	3:12

Digital download – Acoustic single
No.	Title	Length
1.	"Cross My Heart" (acoustic version)	3:27

== Charts ==
=== Weekly charts ===
Weekly chart performance for "Cross My Heart"
Chart (2008–09)	Peak position
Canada (Canadian Hot 100)	15
Canada CHR/Top 40 (Billboard)	11
Canada Hot AC (Billboard)	12

=== Year-end charts ===
Year-end performance for "Cross My Heart"
Chart (2009)	Position
Canada (Canadian Hot 100)	43

== Certifications ==
Certifications and sales for "Cross My Heart"
Region	Certification	Certified units/sales
Canada (Music Canada)	3× Platinum	240,000^{‡}
^{‡} Sales+streaming figures based on certification alone.
