= I'm Not Getting Better =

Single by Marianas Trench

from the album Haven
- Released: July 12, 2024
- Genre: Dance pop; synthpop
- Length: 2:49
- Label: 604
- Songwriter: Josh Ramsay
- Producer: Ramsay

Marianas Trench singles chronology
"Lightning and Thunder" (2024)	"I'm Not Getting Better" (2024)	"Down to You" (2024)

Music video
- "I'm Not Getting Better" (lyric video) on YouTube

"I'm Not Getting Better" is a song by Canadian pop rock band Marianas Trench. It was released on July 12, 2024, as the third single from the group's sixth studio album, Haven, via 604 Records.

== Background ==
On July 5, 2024, announced the single "I'm Not Getting Better", set for release on July 12, as the group's third single from their sixth studio album released in the summer of 2024. The song is described as the band's correspondent to "the third plot point featured in Joseph Campbell's The Hero's Journey." The track is about reflecting on self-doubt and overcoming life's obstacles.

== Composition ==
"I'm Not Getting Better" was written and produced by Josh Ramsay. The track is described as dance and synthpop. The lyrics of the song speak about "the fear or insecurity that causes a hero to refuse their call to adventure – and what it takes to get past that."

== Critical reception ==
Paige Owens of idobi Radio stated, "Told across the group's signature theatrics and synth-heavy backdrop, 'I'm Not Getting Better' offers an upbeat reflection on self-doubt and the resilience needed to overcome life's obstacles. Vocalist Josh Ramsay's remarkable delivery navigates the listener through the emotional highs and lows, showcasing the full breadth of his range." Johan Wippsson of Melodic described it as "a poignant track," showcasing the group's "signature pop punk sound, with lead singer Josh Ramsay's heartfelt vocals delivering lyrics that express feelings of hopelessness and dejection." He also praised the song's "contrasting elements" that deliver "upbeat drums and dancy background vocals." Aman Shamim of The Honey Pop praised the production on the track, remarking, "it puts them in a league of their own [...] This track is pure synth pop goodness with a catchy hook that will get stuck in your head."

== Personnel ==
Credits for "I'm Not Getting Better" adapted from album's liner notes.

Marianas Trench

- Josh Ramsay – lead vocals, rhythm guitar
- Matt Webb – lead guitar, backing vocals
- Mike Ayley – bass guitar, backing vocals
- Ian Casselman – drums, backing vocals

Production

- Josh Ramsay – producer, engineer
- Dave Ogilvie – mixing

== Release history ==
Release dates and formats for "I'm Not Getting Better"
Region	Date	Format	Label	Ref.
Various	July 12, 2024	Digital download; streaming	604 Records	
