= Celebrity Status =

Single by Marianas Trench

from the album Masterpiece Theatre
- Released: February 12, 2010
- Genre: Pop punk
- Length: 3:05 (Album Version); 3:07 (Radio Mix)
- Label: 604
- Songwriter: Josh Ramsay
- Producer: Dave Ogilvie

Marianas Trench singles chronology
"Beside You" (2009)	"Celebrity Status" (2010)	"Good to You" (2010)

Music video
- "Celebrity Status" on YouTube

"Celebrity Status" is a song by Canadian pop rock band Marianas Trench. It was released for radio airplay on February 12, 2010, as the fourth single from their second studio album Masterpiece Theatre. The song was released for digital download on April 6, via iTunes. The song peaked at number 24 on the Canadian Hot 100 and is certified double platinum in Canada.

== Background and composition ==
The song is about the music business in a satirical matter and how people will want to change and take advantage of you. The track runs at 164 BPM and is in the key of E major.

The song was featured along with Pink's Raise Your Glass in the University of British Columbia's lipdub video released on April 8, 2011.

== Awards and nominations ==
Awards and nominations for "Celebrity Status"
Year	Organization	Award	Result	Ref(s)
2010	MuchMusic Video Awards	UR Fave Video of the Year	Nominated	
2010	MuchMusic Video Awards	Pop Video of the Year	Nominated	
2011	Independent Music Awards	Astral Media Radio Favourite Single	Won	
2011	Independent Music Awards	Video of the Year	Nominated	

=== Accolades ===
Publication	Country	Accolade	Year	Rank	Ref(s)
Alternative Addiction	United States	"Song of the Year"	2010	24	

== Music video ==
The music video for "Celebrity Status" was directed by Colin Minihan and Tony Mirza. The video premiered on MuchMusic's MuchOnDemand on March 31, 2010. It features Josh Ramsay in his home at night channel surfing on his TV. Throughout the video, parodies of TV shows and commercials are shown, typically with the band members playing the roles. These include a cooking show, a sitcom, CSI (on the Ox channel), Cops, a courtroom show and 90210. The band is seen performing in between the shows. Shots of Josh as the viewer are shown throughout, noting his disengagement with what is on the television. During the last chorus, a fire starts erupting in some of the shows. The TV catches fire, waking him a now sleeping Josh, and he stares as the fire spreads to the curtain.

The music video earned two nominations at the 2010 MuchMusic Video Awards for "UR Fave Video of the Year" and "Pop Video or the Year". It was also nominated for "Video of the Year" at the 2011 Independent Music Awards.

== Charts ==
=== Weekly charts ===
Weekly chart performance for "Celebrity Status"
Chart (2009–10)	Peak position
Canada (Canadian Hot 100)	24
Canada CHR/Top 40 (Billboard)	12
Canada Hot AC (Billboard)	17

=== Year-end charts ===
Year-end chart performance for "Celebrity Status"
Chart (2010)	Position
Canada (Canadian Hot 100)	69

== Certifications ==
Certifications and sales for "Celebrity Status"
Region	Certification	Certified units/sales
Canada (Music Canada)	2× Platinum	160,000^{‡}
^{‡} Sales+streaming figures based on certification alone.

== Release history ==
Release dates and formats for "Celebrity Status"
Region	Date	Format	Label	Ref.
Canada	February 12, 2010	Contemporary hit radio	604 Records	
Various	April 6, 2010	Digital download	604 Records	
