= 2010 MuchMusic Video Awards =

Annual edition of the awards show

- Date: 20 June 2010
- Location: 299 Queen Street West
- Country: Canada
- Hosted by: Miley Cyrus, Sarah Taylor, Tim Deegan, and Devon Soltendieck
- Website: http://mmva.muchmusic.com

Television/radio coverage
- Network: MuchMusic; Fuse (US)

The 2010 MuchMusic Video Awards were held in Toronto, Ontario, Canada at MuchMusic's headquarters on 20 June 2010. Along with the MuchMusic VJ's, it was confirmed on the MuchMusic website that Miley Cyrus will co-host the show. The artists with the most nominations are Drake and Hedley with six. For the 1st time since 2001, Fuse televised the MMVAs in the United States. Hedley and Justin Bieber tied for most wins at the 2010 MMVAs with 3 wins each.

== Winners and nominees ==
Nominees for the People's Choice awards were announced in early May 2010. One "wildcard" nominee was to be chosen in each of these categories (as voted by the Much Music viewers). The complete list of nominees, plus the wildcard pics, were released 18 May 2010.

=== Video of the Year ===
- Hedley — "Perfect"
- Billy Talent — "Devil on My Shoulder"
- Danny Fernandes — "Addicted"
- Nickelback — "I'd Come For You"
- Stereos — "Summer Girl"

=== Post Production of the Year ===
- Hedley — "Perfect"
- Classified f. Maestro, Choclair & Moka Only — "Quit While You're Ahead"
- illScarlett f. Kardinal Offishall – "Milkshakes and Razorblades"
- Lights — "Saviour"
- Three Days Grace — "Break"

=== Cinematography of the Year ===
- Trey Songz & Drake – "Successful"
- Alexisonfire – "The Northern"
- Belly f. Snoop Dogg – "Hot Girl"
- Danny Fernandes – "Never Again"
- Hedley – "Perfect"

=== Director of the Year ===
- Billy Talent – "Saint Veronika" Director: Michael Maxxis
- Classified – "Oh Canada" Director: Cazhmere
- Hedley – "Perfect" Director: Kyle Davison
- k-os f. Saukrates – "I Wish I Knew Natalie Portman" Director: X
- Shawn Desman – "Shiver" Director: RT!

=== Pop Video of the Year ===
- Hedley – "Cha-Ching"
- Down With Webster – "Your Man"
- Faber Drive – "G-Get Up and Dance"
- Marianas Trench – "Celebrity Status"
- Stereos – "Summer Girl"

=== MuchLOUD Rock Video of the Year ===
- Billy Talent – "Devil On My Shoulder"
- Alexisonfire – "Young Cardinals"
- Die Mannequin – "Bad Medicine"
- Nickelback – "I'd Come For You"
- Three Days Grace – "Break"

=== MuchVIBE Hip Hop Video of the Year ===
- Trey Songz & Drake – "Successful"
- Belly f. Snoop Dogg – "Hot Girl"
- Classified – "Oh Canada"
- k-os f. Saukrates – "I Wish I Knew Natalie Portman"
- Kardinal Offishall f. Riley – "We Gon Go"

=== VideoFACT Indie Video of the Year ===
- Belly f. Snoop Dogg – "Hot Girl"
- Alexisonfire – "Young Cardinals"
- Arkells – "Pullin' Punches"
- Metric – "Gold Guns Girls"
- Ten Second Epic f. Lights – "Every Day"

=== International Video of the Year – Artist ===
- Miley Cyrus – "Party in the U.S.A."
- Adam Lambert – "Whataya Want from Me"
- Eminem – "Beautiful"
- Jason Derulo – "Whatcha Say"
- Jay-Z feat. Alicia Keys – "Empire State of Mind"
- Katy Perry – "Waking Up in Vegas"
- Ke$ha – "Tik Tok"
- Lady Gaga feat. Beyoncé – "Telephone"
- Rihanna – "Rude Boy"
- Taylor Swift – "You Belong with Me"

=== International Video of the Year – Group ===
- Jonas Brothers – "Paranoid"
- 3OH!3 f. Katy Perry – "Starstrukk"
- Cobra Starship f. Leighton Meester – "Good Girls Go Bad"
- Gorillaz – "Stylo"
- Green Day – "21 Guns"
- Kings Of Leon – "Notion"
- MGMT – "Flash Delirium"
- The Black Eyed Peas – "I Gotta Feeling"
- Tokio Hotel – "Automatic"
- Young Money – "BedRock"

=== International Video of the Year by a Canadian ===
- Justin Bieber – "One Time"
- Avril Lavigne – "Alice"
- Drake – "Over"
- Drake f. Kanye West, Lil Wayne & Eminem – "Forever"
- Justin Bieber ft. Ludacris – "Baby"

=== MuchMusic.com Most Watched Video ===
Young Artists for Haiti – Wavin' Flag

=== UR Fave: Video ===
- Justin Bieber f. Ludacris — "Baby"
- Drake featuring Kanye West, Lil Wayne and Eminem — "Forever"
- Hedley — "Perfect"
- Marianas Trench — "Celebrity Status"
- WILDCARD: Avril Lavigne – "Alice"

=== UR Fave: International Video ===
- Adam Lambert — "Whataya Want From Me"
- Ke$ha — "TiK ToK"
- Lady Gaga f. Beyonce — "Telephone"
- Miley Cyrus — "Party in the U.S.A."
- WILDCARD: Taylor Swift — "You Belong With Me"

=== UR Fave: New Artist ===
- Justin Bieber f. Ludacris — "Baby"
- Down With Webster — "Rich Girl$"
- Drake f. Kanye West, Lil Wayne and Eminem — "Forever"
- Stereos — "Summer Girl"
- WILDCARD: Carly Rae Jepsen — "Bucket"

== Performances ==
=== Pre-show ===
- Stereos - Summer Girl

=== Main show ===
- Miley Cyrus – "Party in the U.S.A." (Parking Lot Stage)
- Down with Webster – "Your Man" (Parking Lot Stage)
- Adam Lambert – "Whataya Want from Me" (John St. Stage)
- Marianas Trench – "Celebrity Status" (Rooftop Stage)
- Kesha – "Tik Tok" (Parking Lot Stage)
- Hedley – "Perfect" (John St. Stage)
- Katy Perry – "California Gurls" (Parking Lot Stage)
- Drake – "Over" (John St. Stage) (performance was delayed due to technical difficulties)
- Justin Bieber – "Somebody to Love" and "Baby" medley (Parking Lot Stage)
- Miley Cyrus – "Can't Be Tamed" (Parking Lot Stage)

== Presenters ==
- Emily Osment and Kristin Cavallari - presented International Video of the Year by a Canadian
- Three Days Grace and Bedouin Soundclash - introduced UR Fave: New Artist nominees
- Gabe Saporta and Miranda Cosgrove - presented MuchVIBE Hip Hop Video of the Year
- Charlotte Arnold and JLS - introduced UR Fave: International Video nominees
- Shenae Grimes - introduced Marianas Trench
- Whitney Port and Pauly D - presented Pop Video of the Year
- Faber Drive, Karl Wolf, and Nikki Yanofsky - introduced UR Fave: Video nominees
- Kellan Lutz - presented UR Fave: New Artist
- Perez Hilton - introduced Hedley
- Blake McGrath and Girlicious - introduced Katy Perry
- Leah Miller and Lights - presented Video of the Year
- Jonathan Toews - introduced Drake
- Shailene Woodley, Daren Kagasoff and Megan Park - presented International Video of the Year – Artist
- Jessica Szohr - introduced Justin Bieber
- Snooki - presented UR Fave: International Video
- Nina Dobrev - presented UR Fave: Video
- Ashley Greene and Xavier Samuel - introduced Miley Cyrus
