= Ever After (Marianas Trench album) =

Studio album by Marianas Trench
- Released: November 21, 2011
- Recorded: 2011
- Studio: Umbrella Factory (Richmond, British Columbia)
- Genres: Pop punk; pop rock; symphonic rock
- Length: 52:16
- Label: 604
- Producer: Josh Ramsay

Marianas Trench chronology
Masterpiece Theatre (2009)	Ever After (2011)	Face the Music (2013)

Singles from Ever After
- 1. "Haven't Had Enough" Released: July 19, 2011; 2. "Fallout" Released: November 14, 2011; 3. "Desperate Measures" Released: July 4, 2012; 4. "Stutter" Released: December 4, 2012; 5. "By Now" Released: June 10, 2013

Ever After is the third studio album by Canadian rock group Marianas Trench. It was released on November 21, 2011, in Canada and December 21, 2011, in the US. The album was certified Triple Platinum by Music Canada in January 2018. Five singles were released from the album, including the Canadian Hot 100 Top 10 hit "Haven't Had Enough" and the Top 20 Canada Hot AC airplay hits "Stutter" and "By Now". The album's first four singles have been certified Double Platinum by Music Canada.

== Background ==
=== Composition ===
In an interview with Alternative Addiction in March 2011, lead singer Josh Ramsay said they had begun recording songs for their third album with a planned release date for the fall. He also confirmed that a single had been completed and would be released in the summer. The single was announced to be "Haven't Had Enough", released in July 2011. That same month, the group revealed 4 more song titles from the forthcoming album, "Fallout", "By Now", "So Soon" and "Toy Soldiers". After months of anticipation, Ramsay announced on Twitter that the album will be titled Ever After. The band announced that the album would be released on November 29, 2011, however this date was later pushed up to November 21. The band announced that there would not be any breaks in between the tracks on the record, and would instead have a new track start as soon as the previous track ended, without a pause, making it an hour-long continuous piece of music. Through YouTube, the band previewed recordings of a gospel choir for their song "Stutter", as well as a few recordings from the band. The album cover was revealed on the band's Facebook page on October 17, 2011, and it features a series of toys on a shelf.

Production on the album began in the beginning of 2011. The album was produced by Ramsay and was recorded at his studio, Umbrella Factory, in Richmond, British Columbia. The group decided to produce it on their own as it allowed them complete the album "as quickly as possible" and avoided having to wait to "work around a producer's schedule," which would have slowed their process, according to Ayley. Musically, Ramsay described the sound as "radio style, pop/top 40 style," though noted it would not be much of a departure from their previous sound featured on Masterpiece Theatre, rather that the band "pushed themselves even further." He also said the record was influenced by Queen, the Beach Boys and Michael Jackson. Bassist Mike Ayley noted a progression in the group's sound stating that they have learned more about "writing and recording music from album to album." Drummer Ian Casselman stated that they avoided trying to create "the same album over and over again," and with this record, they decided to incorporate some theatrics into it. He also spoke about the process of having to piece the track list and making sure that each song would flow together in a nice order stating, "When songs are different, it's hard to flow one song into another, so it took quite a while to decide what the order is and what to put in between them."

=== Storyline ===
Ever After is a concept album based around a fairytale concept. Ayley described it as a "Tim Burton kind of story." In addition to the fact that there is no pause between the tracks, Ever After also has a storyline told through the album's songs as well as its booklet. The story tells of a fictionalized Josh Ramsay and his adventures in the fantasy kingdom of Toyland.

It tells a story of a man awakening in a land run by Queen Carolina, who uses her factory to build toys that steal hearts. The man goes on a mission to find Porcelain: the missing, heartless, adopted daughter of the former king. She holds a piece of a key that opens a chest that will allow him to return home.

== Release ==
The album became available for full preview on the MuchMusic website a week before the release. The album was released on November 21. Some stores such as Wal-Mart, sold limited edition "Fan-packs" of Ever After that include a Marianas Trench T-shirt. A deluxe edition of the album was re-issued in March 2014.

== Singles ==
The first single from the album, entitled "Haven't Had Enough" was released on July 19, 2011. The music video for the song was released on August 26. "By Now" was released as a free download to people who pre-ordered the Deluxe Edition of Ever After on iTunes. The second official single, "Fallout" was released to iTunes on November 14. On February 1, 2012, a music video for "Fallout" premiered via MTV. A behind-the-scenes video was also released. The third single "Desperate Measures" was released on July 4, and had its music video premiere the same day. The fourth single "Stutter" was released on December 4. Although not playing the character of Princess Porcelain, actress Olivia Ryan-Stern was featured in this video. The music video premiered on the MuchMusic Top 10 on December 17, 2012. The fifth and final single, "By Now" was released for radio airplay on June 10, 2013. The music video for the song was released on August 1.

== Promotion ==
They toured with The Ready Set, Allstar Weekend, and The Downtown Fiction in the 2011 Glamour Kills Tour. In October and November, the group supported Simple Plan on their headlining US tour. They toured in Canada with Simple Plan, All Time Low, and These Kids Wear Crowns in February. In April, the group planned to go on a tour of the US. However, they had to cancel it due to illness.

In May, the group appeared at The Bamboozle festival in the US. Following this, the group appeared on the Journeys Backyard BBQ Tour, which included indoor and outdoor performances at malls in the US. Further US shows took place following the conclusion of the tour. Some of the shows were performed with The Audition. In September, the group performed at the Bazooka Rocks Festival in the Philippines.

In October 2012, the group embarked on the Face the Music tour, with support from Down with Webster, Anami Vice and Jesse Giddings. A continuation of the tour expanded from March to July 2013, under the name, Face the Music: With a Vengeance Tour. In May and June, the group also went on the Noise Tour with Air Dubai.

== Critical reception ==
Professional ratings
Review scores
Source	Rating
AbsolutePunk	9/10 stars
AllMusic	3/5 stars
Alternative Addiction	4.5/5 stars
Melodic	4.5/5 stars

Ever After was met with positive reviews from music critics. Joe DeAndrea of AbsolutePunk said the album was "damn near flawless" and that it could be a "top candidate for one of the best pop-rock albums of 2011." He praised the slower tempo tracks such as "Porcelain" and "So Soon" for its instrumentation and called "Desperate Measures" and "Stutter" the album's standout tracks. Timothy Monger of AllMusic stated, "Their pop-punk core remains intact, but is tempered by strong elements of synth and dance-pop [...] it's nice to hear a group play around stylistically within the genre. They know their craft well and can fashion hooks and melodies that last for days." However, he criticized the production describing it as "overtly over the top." Alternative Addiction wrote, "It's not as instantly gratifying as Masterpiece Theatre but it has the capacity for a greater longevity. Two back to back amazing records should have Marianas Trench prepped for a great 2012 in Canada and beyond." Johan Wippsson of Melodic described the album as a "blend of classic symphonic rock like Queen with newer punk pop." He also added, "Smart electronic elements and fantastic arrangements is delivered and gives the album a fresh and modern touch, but in a classic way."

== Commercial performance ==
Ever After debuted at number eight on the Canadian Albums Chart. The album was certified Gold in its first week by Music Canada, before reaching platinum status in November 2012. It was certified Triple Platinum by Music Canada in January 2025, denoting sales and streams of 240,000 units. The album also peaked at number 48 on the US Independent Albums chart.

== Awards and nominations ==
Awards and nominations for Ever After
Year	Organization	Award	Result	Ref(s)
2012	Juno Awards	Pop Album of the Year	Nominated	
2012	Western Canadian Music Awards	Pop Recording of the Year	Nominated	
2013	Independent Music Awards	Album of the Year	Nominated	
2013	Juno Awards	Album of the Year	Nominated	

== Track listing ==
All tracks are written by Josh Ramsay.

No.	Title	Length
1.	"Ever After"	6:34
2.	"Haven't Had Enough"	3:28
3.	"By Now"	4:14
4.	"Truth or Dare"	3:49
5.	"Desperate Measures"	3:48
6.	"Porcelain"	4:02
7.	"Fallout"	4:14
8.	"Stutter"	3:21
9.	"Toy Soldiers"	4:10
10.	"B Team"	3:12
11.	"So Soon"	5:50
12.	"No Place Like Home"	6:41

Ever After (deluxe version) [iTunes Only]
No.	Title	Length
13.	"Haven't Had Enough" (Prance-a-tron remix)	4:50
14.	"Haven't Had Enough" (Frederick Miwk mix [extended version])	4:26
15.	"Haven't Had Enough" (music video)	4:01
16.	"Making of the Record" (video)	1:44
17.	"Making of the Haven't Had Enough Video" (video)	6:01

== Personnel ==
Credits for Ever After adapted from AllMusic and album's liner notes.

Marianas Trench

- Josh Ramsay – lead vocals, guitar, piano, harmonica, drums, bass, programming, engineer, mixing (1, 6, 12), string arrangements (1, 11)
- Matt Webb – guitar, piano, vocals
- Mike Ayley – bass, rhythm bass, vocals
- Ian Casselman – drums, percussion, vocals

Additional musicians

- Tania Hancheroff – vocals (8)
- Carolynn Hanney – vocals (8)
- Camille Henderson – vocals (8)
- Saffron Henderson – vocals (8)
- Sarah Johns – vocals (8)
- Luren Music – vocals (8)
- Nik Pesut – additional floor tom (4)
- Miles Ramsay – vocals (8)
- Sara Ramsay – vocals (8)
- John Stamos – additional electric lute
- Vancouver Film Orchestra – strings (1, 11)

Production

- Hal Beckett – strings conductor (1, 11)
- Zack Blackstone – assistant mix engineer (1–5, 7, 8, 10)
- Josh Bowman – assistant mix engineer (1–5, 7, 8, 10)
- Scott Enright – A&R
- Ted Jensen – mastering
- Martin Kierszenbaum – A&R
- Roger Monk – strings engineer (1, 11)
- Eric Mosher – assistant strings engineer (1, 11)
- Dave Ogilvie – mixing (1–5, 7–12)
- Ivan Otis – photography
- Brad Salter – assistant mix engineer (1–5, 7, 8, 10)
- Jonathan Simkin – A&R

== Tours ==
=== Face the Music Tour ===
Date	City	Country	Venue
Australia
September 22, 2012	Newcastle, New South Wales	Australia	Fat as Butter Festival
September 24, 2012 (Afternoon)	South Melbourne, Victoria	Australia	Radar Music Offices
September 24, 2012 (Evening)	Melbourne	Australia	Corner Hotel
September 25, 2012	Brisbane, Queensland	Australia	The Zoo
September 26, 2012	Sydney	Australia	The Metro Theatre
Asia
September 30, 2012	Pasay	Philippines	SMX Convention Center
North America
October 12, 2012	Barrie, Ontario	Canada	Barrie Molson Centre
October 13, 2012	Hamilton, Ontario	Canada	Copps Coliseum
October 15, 2012	London, Ontario	Canada	Budweiser Gardens
October 17, 2012	Oshawa, Ontario	Canada	General Motors Centre
October 18, 2012	Montreal, Quebec	Canada	Metropolis
October 21, 2012	Winnipeg, Manitoba	Canada	MTS Centre
October 23, 2012	Regina, Saskatchewan	Canada	Brandt Centre
October 25, 2012	Calgary, Alberta	Canada	Stampede Corral
October 28, 2012	Lethbridge, Alberta	Canada	ENMAX Centre
October 29, 2012	Edmonton, Alberta	Canada	Rexall Place
October 30, 2012	Dawson Creek, British Columbia	Canada	EnCana Events Centre
November 1, 2012	Victoria, British Columbia	Canada	Save-On-Foods Memorial Centre
November 3, 2012	Kamloops, British Columbia	Canada	Interior Savings Centre

=== Face the Music: With a Vengeance Tour ===
Date	City	Country	Venue
North America
March 23, 2013	Fredericton, New Brunswick	Canada	Aitken Centre
March 24, 2013	Halifax, Nova Scotia	Canada	Halifax Metro Centre
March 26, 2013	Montreal, Quebec	Canada	Uniprix Stadium
March 28, 2013	Kingston, Ontario	Canada	K-Rock Centre
March 30, 2013	Peterborough, Ontario	Canada	Peterborough Memorial Centre
April 2, 2013	Kitchener, Ontario	Canada	Kitchener Memorial Auditorium Complex
April 3, 2013	Windsor, Ontario	Canada	WFCU Centre
April 5, 2013	Sudbury, Ontario	Canada	Sudbury Community Arena
April 6, 2013	Sault Ste Marie, Ontario	Canada	Essar Centre
April 8, 2013	Thunder Bay, Ontario	Canada	Thunder Bay Community Auditorium
April 10, 2013	Moose Jaw, Saskatchewan	Canada	Mosaic Place
April 12, 2013	Vancouver, British Columbia	Canada	Pacific Coliseum
April 14, 2013	Prince George, British Columbia	Canada	CN Centre
April 15, 2013	Grand Prairie, Alberta	Canada	Canada Games Arena
April 17, 2013	Red Deer, Alberta	Canada	ENMAX Centrium
April 19, 2013	Saskatoon, Saskatchewan	Canada	Credit Union Centre
July 10, 2013	Ottawa, Ontario	Canada	Ottawa Bluesfest
July 12, 2013	Toronto, Ontario	Canada	Molson Canadian Amphitheatre

== Charts ==
=== Weekly charts ===
Weekly chart performance for Ever After
Chart (2011)	Peak position
Canadian Albums (Billboard)	8
Canadian Alternative Albums (Nielsen SoundScan)	12
US Heatseekers Albums (Billboard)	5
US Independent Albums (Billboard)	48

=== Year-end charts ===
Year-end chart performance for Ever After
Chart (2011)	Position
Canadian Albums (Nielsen SoundScan)	125

== Certifications ==
Region	Certification	Certified units/sales
Canada (Music Canada)	3× Platinum	240,000^{‡}
^{‡} Sales+streaming figures based on certification alone.
