= Marianas Trench (band) =

Canadian pop rock band

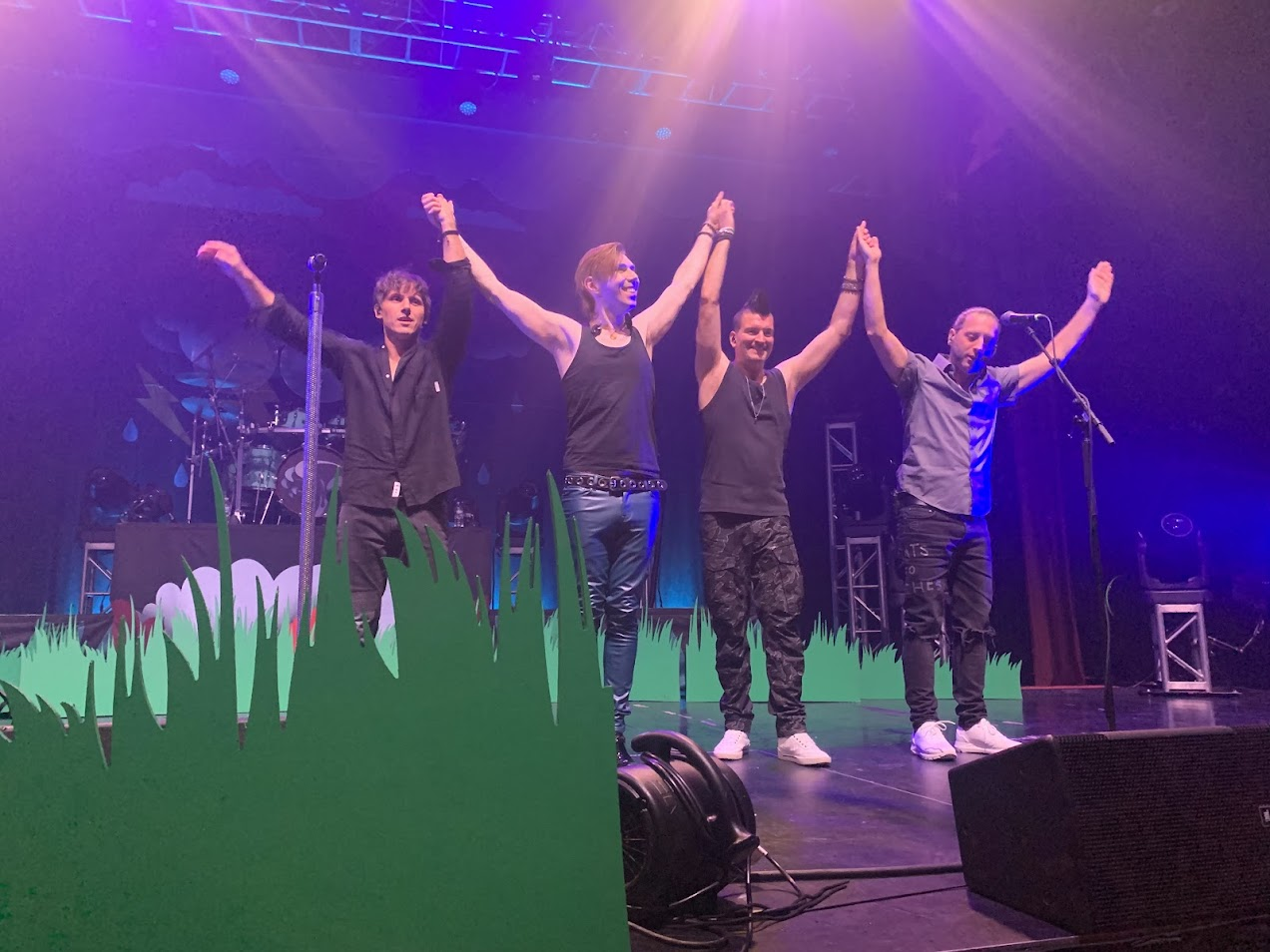
- Marianas Trench in 2024

Background information
- Origin: Vancouver, British Columbia, Canada
- Genres: Pop rock; pop-punk; symphonic rock; emo
- Years active: 1999–present
- Label: 604
- Members: Josh Ramsay; Ian Casselman; Matt Webb; Mike Ayley
- Past members: Erik Scott; Morgan Hempstead; Sara Ramsay; Steve Marshall; Trev Spilchen
- Website: marianastrench.net

Marianas Trench is a Canadian pop rock band from Vancouver. They have released six studio albums: Fix Me (2006), Masterpiece Theatre (2009), Ever After (2011), Astoria (2015), Phantoms (2019), and Haven (2024). The band has been nominated for seven Juno Awards and won Group of the Year in 2013. They have received praise for their showmanship, vocal harmonies, and genre-blending music. Their albums Masterpiece Theatre and Ever After have reached double-platinum status, while their singles "Haven't Had Enough", "Desperate Measures", "Fallout", "Stutter", and "All to Myself" are certified 3× platinum in Canada.

== History ==
=== Beginnings: 1999–2004 ===
Marianas Trench was formed in 1999 by Josh Ramsay (lead vocalist, guitarist, pianist) and guitarist Steve Marshall, with Ramsay's sister Sara on keyboards and vocals, Erik Scott on drums, and Trev Spilchen on bass. Originally called Ramsay Fiction, Marshall suggested a name change when Ramsay's high school friend Matt Webb, drummer Ian Casselman, and bassist Morgan Hempstead replaced Scott, Spilchen, and Sara Ramsay. Prior to the formation of the group, Ramsay sent out demos to people, hoping "to get stuff happening." This caught the attention of 604 Records co-founder Jonathan Simkin, who liked the material but told Ramsay he needed "a good producer" and offered to help him find one. They became acquainted with producer Brad McGivern in 2001 and produced a demo EP. The response from many labels was not encouraging, however, and Ramsay recalled, "I think it was the mix of the recordings not being right." He continued to write, and the band recorded and released a self-titled EP in 2002. It contained songs that would later appear on their debut album, Fix Me. The group performed at the NewMusicWest festival in May 2002 as well as playing shows in Toronto at Tequila Lounge in June. They soon attracted the interest of several record labels, before eventually signing with Chad Kroeger's 604 Records in January 2003. Mike Ayley, a longtime friend of Casselman, took up bass responsibilities when Hempstead and Marshall left the band in 2004, taking the five-piece down to four.

=== Fix Me: 2005–2007 ===
Marianas Trench initially posted the track "Say Anything" online on March 6, 2006, and this was later released as their first single, on June 13. The song reached number three on the Canadian Singles Chart. The band issued their debut, full-length studio album, Fix Me, on October 3, 2006. Their second single, "Decided to Break It", came out on the same day and found some radio success, peaking at number 14 on the Canadian Singles Chart. "Shake Tramp" was released in September 2007 as the third single and was labelled as the band's "breakthrough single". The song peaked at No. 65 on the Canadian Hot 100 and reached number one on MuchMusic's Countdown. The song also earned a Juno nomination for Video of the Year in 2008.

Fix Me was produced by the band and Dave Genn, and it was engineered and mixed by Mike Fraser, with recording taking place at the Warehouse Studio and Mushroom Studios in Vancouver and at the Umbrella Factory in Richmond, BC. Many of the songs, which contain themes of self-loathing and disappointment, were written as a reflection of Ramsay's struggle with addiction. He later described writing them as "therapeutic". Despite its lack of chart success, the album sold 35,000 copies and was certified Gold in Canada.

The group was nominated for Best New Group/Solo Artist of the Year at the Canadian Radio Music Awards, and "Shake Tramp" won the SOCAN No. 1 Song Award.

=== Masterpiece Theatre: 2008–2010 ===
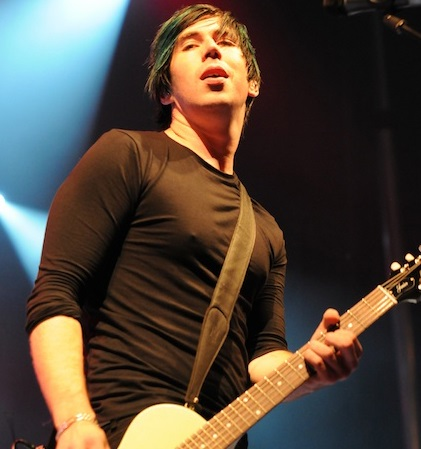
Lead singer Josh Ramsay in 2010

After the release of Fix Me, Ramsay spoke with UWO Gazette about the expectations of publishing the next record: "you have a year and a half to write your second album. We've got a lot of good material and I think that the second one will be even better than the first one." Masterpiece Theatre, the band's follow-up record, was released on February 24, 2009. It debuted at No. 4 on the Canadian Albums Chart and sold 5,000 copies in its first week. The first single, "Cross My Heart", came out on November 24, 2008, peaking at No. 15 on the Canadian Hot 100. The song was nominated for four MuchMusic Video Awards in 2009 and was certified triple Platinum in Canada. "All to Myself" was released on February 24, 2009, as the second single and peaked at No. 11 on the Canadian Hot 100; it was also certified triple Platinum. "Beside You" first came out as a digital promotional single on the same day as the album, before it was issued for radio airplay on September 2, 2009, as the third single. The song reached No. 28 on the Canadian Hot 100 and was certified double Platinum. Toward the end of 2009, the band embarked on the Beside You tour with Carly Rae Jepsen.

Marianas Trench performed several free concerts during the 2010 Vancouver Olympics, at the LiveCity Yaletown stage and Richmond O Zone. "Celebrity Status" came out on February 12, 2010, as the fourth single and peaked at No. 24 on the Canadian Hot 100; it was also certified double Platinum. A music video for the song was nominated for UR Fave Video and Pop Video of the Year at the 2010 MuchMusic Video Awards. In 2010, the band held a contest for fans to send in a video of them singing "Good to You", with the winner getting to perform with them onstage at Massey Hall in Toronto. The eventual winner was Jessica Lee, who was included in the single version of the song, whereas the album version features Kate Voegele. The track was released on September 21, 2010, as the fifth and final single from Masterpiece Theatre. It peaked at No. 38 on the Canadian Hot 100 and was certified double Platinum. The song earned three nominations at the 2011 MuchMusic Video Awards, including Pop Video of the Year and Director of the Year. The band's first US show took place on September 23, 2010, at the Bowery Electric in Manhattan, New York. On November 30, 2010, a director's cut of Masterpiece Theatre was released and included bonus acoustic versions of the songs "Celebrity Status" and "Cross My Heart", an alternate version of "Good to You" (feat. Jessica Lee), as well as a cover of "And So It Goes" by Billy Joel. Masterpiece Theatre was certified triple Platinum in Canada. The album was nominated at the Western Canadian Music Awards for Pop Recording of the Year.

Ramsay also took part in a project called Young Artists for Haiti to raise funds to support the victims of the 2010 earthquake. Marianas Trench participated in UBC's Lip dub event on March 26, 2011. The video featured approximately 1,000 students and community members lip-syncing to the band's song "Celebrity Status" and "Raise Your Glass" by Pink.

=== Ever After: 2011–2013 ===
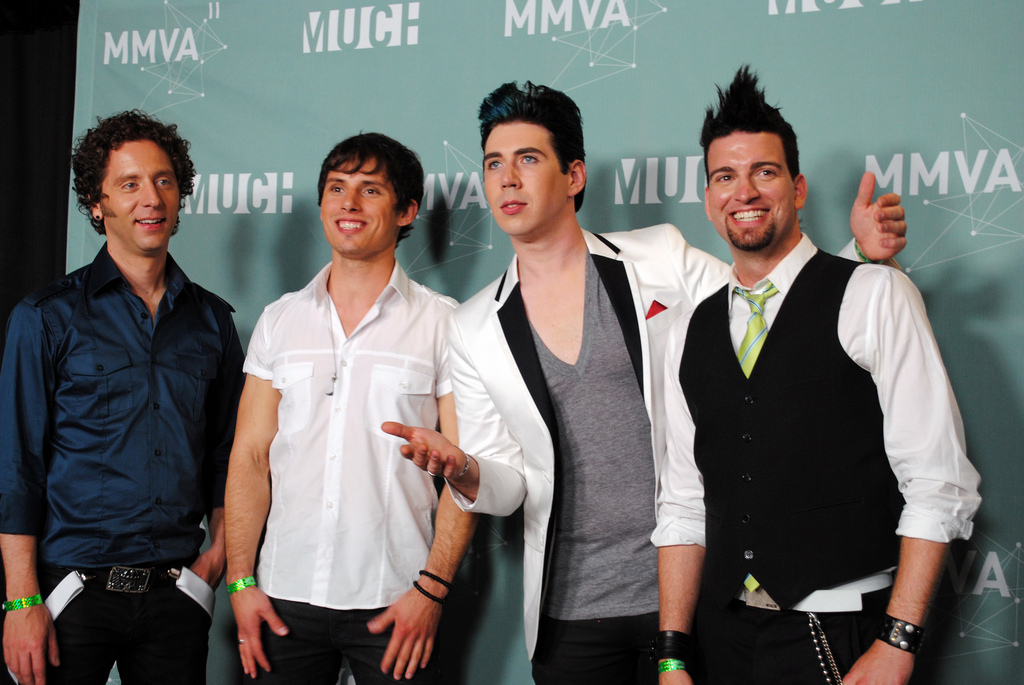
Marianas Trench at the 2011 MuchMusic Video Awards

In March 2011, Ramsay stated they had started recording songs for their third album, with a planned release date for later that year. He also confirmed that a single had been completed and would come out in subsequent months. The song was revealed to be "Haven't Had Enough", released on July 19, 2011, as the album's first single; it was later certified triple Platinum. It also peaked at No. 9 on the Canadian Hot 100. Through a series of studio updates on their YouTube page, the band released recordings of the gospel choir for their song "Stutter" as well as a track with some of the band members' vocals on other songs from the album. The band's third studio record, Ever After, was issued on November 21, 2011. It was produced by Ramsay and recorded at his studio, Umbrella Factory, in Richmond, British Columbia. Ramsay stated that there would be no breaks between tracks on the new record: as soon as one track ended, the next would begin without pause, essentially making the album one extended song. A concept album, it was described by Casselman as a "Tim Burton-esque fairy tale." "Fallout" was issued as the second single from the album on November 14, 2011, and peaked at number 26 on the Canadian Hot 100. "Desperate Measures" came out on July 4, 2012, as the third single, and peaked at number 20. "Stutter" was released as the fourth single, on December 4, 2012. The song reached number 28 on the Canadian Hot 100 and was certified triple platinum in Canada. "By Now" was issued as the fifth and final single, on June 10, 2013. It peaked at number 50 on the Canadian Hot 100 and was certified gold. Ever After peaked at number eight on the Canadian Albums Chart and was certified double platinum. The album also reached the US Heatseekers Albums chart, at number five.

Marianas Trench joined the Glamour Kills Tour in 2011 with the Ready Set, Allstar Weekend, the Downtown Fiction, and We Are the In Crowd. They were added to Simple Plan's Get Your Heart On! tour with Forever the Sickest Kids, and the Cab in the US, and All Time Low and These Kids Wear Crowns in Canada. Marianas Trench began the American leg of the Ever After Tour on April 6, 2012, in New York City. Due to Ramsay's illness, the rest of the tour was postponed to later in 2012. The band performed as part of Journey's Backyard BBQ Tour in the summer of 2012 with the All-American Rejects, Hit the Lights, Never Shout Never, and Eve 6. They then performed at the Fat As Butter Festival with additional tour dates as part of their first headlining tour of Australia, in September 2012. They performed at the Bazooka Rocks Festival, the Philippines' first indoor rock festival, on September 30, 2012, along with the Pretty Reckless, Mayday Parade, the Maine, Forever the Sickest Kids, and A Skylit Drive. The band embarked on their first Canadian headlining arena tour, Face the Music, which began October 12, 2012, in Barrie, Ontario, and concluded November 3, 2012, in Kamloops, BC. On November 25, 2012, they performed "Stutter" at half-time at the 100th Grey Cup. Ever After was nominated for Pop Album of the Year at the 2012 Juno Awards. They also received eight nominations at the 2012 MuchMusic Video Awards, including one for Favorite Artist/Group of the Year. "Haven't Had Enough" won Pop Video of the Year, and "Fallout" won Cinematography of the Year.

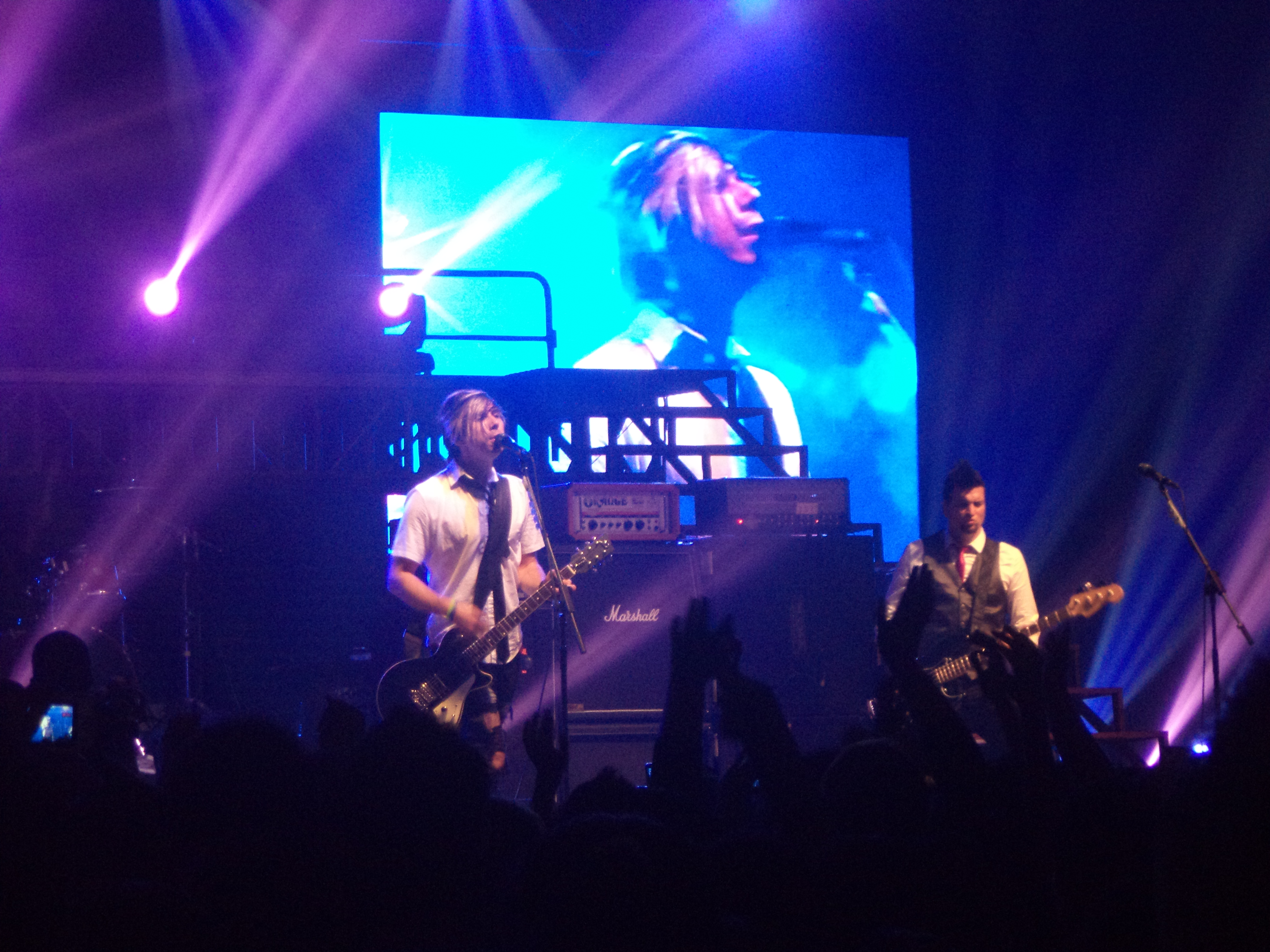
Marianas Trench performing in 2012

On March 20, 2013, the group headlined the Canadian Radio Music Awards at Koolhaus in Toronto. In the spring of 2013, a second part of the Face the Music tour took place across Canada. Named Face the Music: With a Vengeance, it included supporting acts Down with Webster and Anami Vice. On April 10, 2013, Marianas Trench announced that they had signed with Cherrytree Records and Interscope, who would handle their releases outside of Canada, while 604 Records continued to manage Canadian publications. On April 21, Marianas Trench performed an a cappella version of "Fallout", leading straight into "Stutter", at the 2013 Juno Awards. At the ceremony, Ever After was nominated for Album of the Year. The band also won Group of the Year.

A four-song EP, titled Face the Music, was released on May 10, 2013, containing the album versions of "Haven't Had Enough" and "Desperate Measures" as well as acoustic versions of "Haven't Had Enough" and "Fallout." The EP peaked at number 43 on the US Heatseekers Albums chart. In May and June 2013, they completed their first headlining coast-to-coast US tour, called the Noise Tour. The group performed at the 2013 MuchMusic Video Awards and won Pop Video of the Year for "Desperate Measures" and UR Fave Video for "Stutter".

=== Astoria: 2014–2017 ===
In early 2014, the group began working on their next album, posting studio updates on their YouTube page. The single "Pop 101", featuring Anami Vice, was released on July 29, 2014. The song reached No. 27 on the Canadian Hot 100. The group toured in Australia and New Zealand in the fall of 2014. On October 30, they performed a new song, titled "Here's to the Zeros", in the first show of the tour. It came out as a single on December 25, 2014, in Canada and the United States, with an international release on December 29, 2014. The song peaked at No. 59 on the Canadian Hot 100 and was nominated at the 2015 MuchMusic Video Awards for Fan Fave Video. On May 26, 2015, Marianas Trench released an EP called Something Old / Something New, which included the two singles as well as two previously unreleased tracks. The group subsequently toured across North America in support of the EP.

On May 28, 2015, they announced that their fourth studio album would be released later in the year and would be titled Astoria. Originally, "Pop 101" and "Here's to the Zeros" would be included, but the album ultimately contained only new tracks. Ramsay stated that the record was inspired by 1980s fantasy and adventure films, and The Goonies (1985) in particular. The album title comes from Astoria, Oregon, the hometown of the Goonies. On September 14, 2015, Marianas Trench released the lead single from Astoria, called "One Love". It peaked at number 50 on the Canadian Hot 100 and was certified platinum. The song also reached number 35 on the US Adult Top 40 chart, marking the group's first charting song in the States. On October 2, 2015, "Wildfire" was released digitally as a promotional single. Astoria was released on October 23, 2015, and peaked at number two on the Canadian Albums Chart; it also debuted at number 53 on the US Billboard 200. The album reached the Australian Albums Chart at number 56. The group headlined the Hey You Guys Tour, across the United States in November 2015 to support the record. They subsequently toured across Canada on the Never Say Die Tour from March to April 2016, with support from Walk off the Earth.

"This Means War" was released on February 16, 2016, as the album's second single, followed by "Who Do You Love" on September 8, 2016. The latter peaked at number 56 on the Canadian Hot 100 and was certified double platinum. Marianas Trench was nominated for Group of the Year at the 2016 Juno Awards. In summer 2016, they started their SPF 80s Tour, which included cities in US. They followed this in November with another Canadian tour, the Last Crusade, with Shawn Hook, as well as the Final Countdown Tour in Europe the following year.

In December 2016, the band donated $10,000 worth of instruments to Lord Selkirk Elementary School, with the help of the musical education charity MusiCounts. Astoria was certified Platinum in Canada and nominated for Pop Album of the Year at the 2017 Juno Awards.

=== Phantoms: 2017–2021 ===
In the fall of 2017, the single "Rhythm of Your Heart" was released. The band performed at New Year's celebrations in Niagara Falls, Ontario, later that year. The lead single off their then-upcoming fifth album, "I Knew You When", was released on November 16, 2018. On December 3, 2018, the band announced the US Suspending Gravity Tour to promote their upcoming album, Phantoms. On February 1, 2019, "Only the Lonely Survive" was issued as the album's second single. On February 7, 2019, "Echoes of You", featuring Roger Joseph Manning Jr., was released digitally as a promotional single.

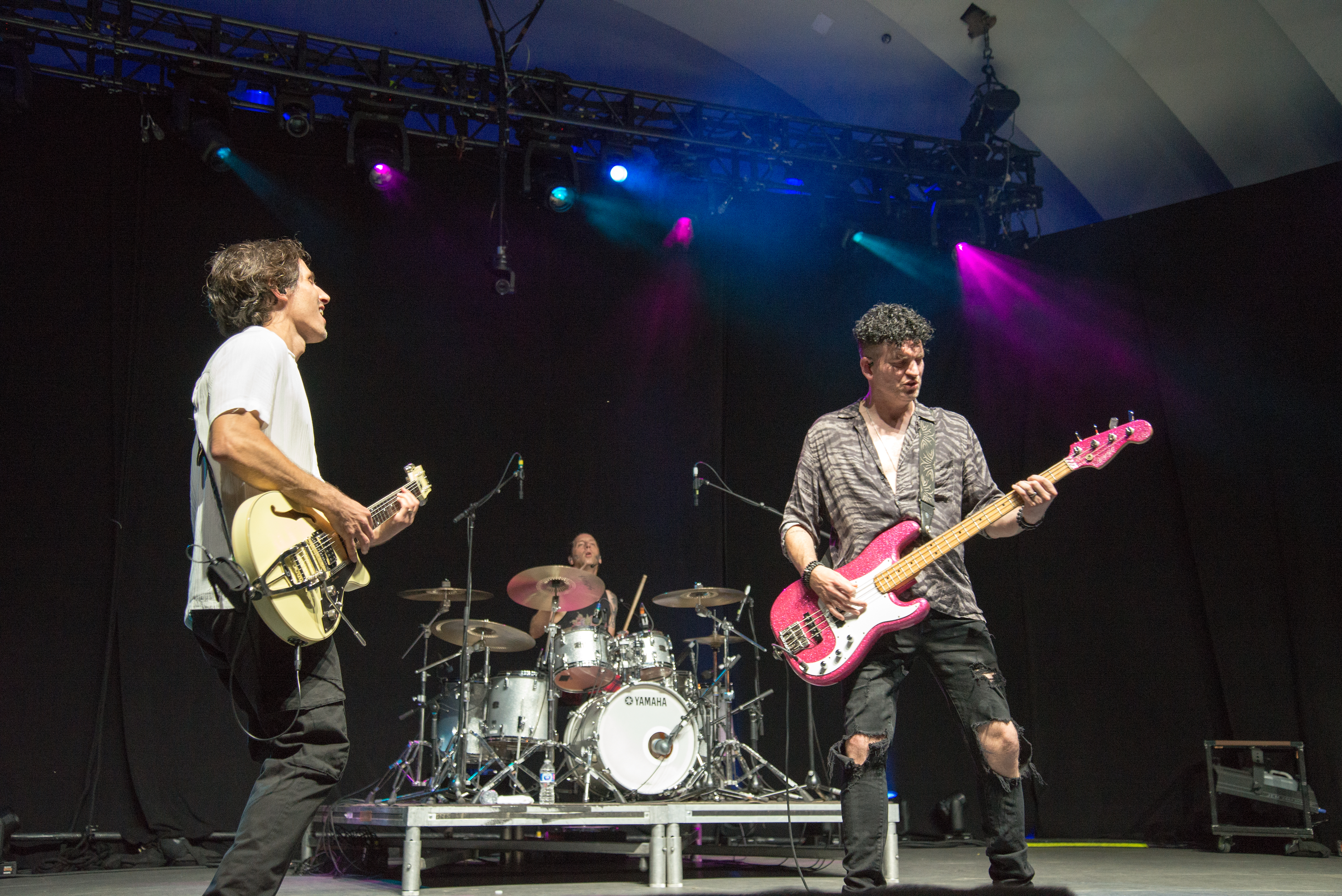
Marianas Trench in 2022

Phantoms came out on March 1, 2019, and follows the theme of "being haunted by the ghosts of former love". Ramsay described the new record as "modern songwriting, but very organic, old-school approaches and trickery... done in a way that you haven't heard us do before." The album peaked at number four on the Canadian Albums Chart. The group toured across North America from March to June in 2019. "Glimmer" was released on June 5, 2019, as the third single from the album, followed by "Don't Miss Me?", on October 3, 2019.

The group spent most of 2021 touring across Canada, including performances at the Calgary Stampede and Malkin Bowl.

=== Haven: 2022–present ===
On June 17, 2022, Marianas Trench released a live album of their performance in Milwaukee, titled, Live at the Rave Milwaukee. In July, they announced on social media that they had begun working on their sixth studio album. The group toured Australia in September, after having to postpone their 2020 and 2021 shows. They toured across Canada in 2023. In April 2024, the band released the single "A Normal Life", followed by "Lightning and Thunder" on May 24. In July, they issued "I'm Not Getting Better" as the third single from their forthcoming album.

On May 28, the band announced the Force of Nature Tour. It began in September and featured support from Cassadee Pope and Grayscale in the US and LØLØ in Canada, among others.

On July 26, Marianas Trench announced on social media that their upcoming album would be titled Haven and that it draws inspiration from Joseph Campbell's The Hero's Journey. According to Ramsay, he used one of the plot points in the story, Campbell's observation in every hero's journey, to guide each track. He began gathering ideas for the album while he was writing his debut solo record, The Josh Ramsay Show, in 2022. On August 16, the band released the album's fourth single, "Down to You". Haven came out on August 30.

A live version of "Nights Like These", which appears on Haven, was released as a single on April 25, 2025. The September–October 2025 leg of the band's Force of Nature tour was supported by the Summer Set.

== Musical style and influences ==
The band's debut album, Fix Me, has been described as hard rock and pop-punk. The subsequent Masterpiece Theatre was described as pop-punk and symphonic rock, as was Ever After. Astoria has been tagged as funk, pop, and pop-punk. Phantoms has been described as electropop and symphonic rock, while the group's latest record, Haven, was described as glam rock and pop-punk.

Members of the band have cited various musical influences over the years, such as Queen, the Beach Boys, Jellyfish, the Police, and Foo Fighters.

== Band members ==
=== Current ===
- Josh Ramsay – lead vocals, guitar, piano, keyboards, programming, flugelhorn (1999–present)
- Matt Webb – guitar, backing vocals, piano, keyboards, programming, trombone (2001–present)
- Mike Ayley – bass guitar, vocals, trumpet (2004–present)
- Ian Casselman – drums and percussion, backing vocals, sousaphone (2001–present)

=== Touring ===
- Royce Whittaker – guitar, keyboards, programming, percussion (2015–present)

=== Former ===
- Morgan Hempstead – bass (1999–2004); guest vocals on Astoria (2015)
- Steve Marshall – guitar (1999–2004); guest vocals on Astoria (2015)
- Sara Ramsay – vocals, keyboards (1999–2001); guest vocals on Astoria (2015)
- Erik Scott – drums (1999–2001)
- Trev Spilchen – bass (1999–2001)

== Discography ==
Studio albums

- Fix Me (2006)
- Masterpiece Theatre (2009)
- Ever After (2011)
- Astoria (2015)
- Phantoms (2019)
- Haven (2024)

== Awards and nominations ==
Year	Nominated work	Award	Result	Ref.
2007	"Shake Tramp"	SOCAN No. 1 Song Award	Won	
2008	Marianas Trench	Canadian Radio Music Awards Best New Group / Solo Artist of the Year	Nominated	
2008	"Shake Tramp"	Juno Video of the Year	Nominated	
2009	"Cross My Heart"	MuchMusic Video Awards Favourite Canadian Video	Nominated	
2009	"Cross My Heart"	MuchMusic Video Awards MUCH LOUD Rock Video of the Year	Nominated	
2009	"Cross My Heart"	MuchMusic Video Awards UR Fave Video	Nominated	
2009	"Cross My Heart"	MuchMusic Video Awards Director of the Year	Won	
2009	Masterpiece Theatre	Western Canadian Music Awards Pop Recording of the Year	Won	
2010	"Cross My Heart"	INDIES.ca: Independent Music Awards Astral Media Radio Favourite Single	Won	
2010	"Cross My Heart"	INDIES.ca: Independent Music Awards Favourite Video	Won	
2010	Marianas Trench	INDIES.ca: Independent Music Awards Favourite Pop Artist / Group	Nominated	
2010	Marianas Trench	Canadian Radio Music Award Fans' Choice Award	Nominated	
2010	Marianas Trench	Canadian Music and Broadcast Industry Awards Nielsen Entertainment Emerging Artist Award	Won	
2010	"Celebrity Status"	MuchMusic Video Awards UR Fave Video	Nominated	
2010	"Celebrity Status"	MuchMusic Video Awards Pop Video of the Year	Nominated	
2010	Masterpiece Theatre	Alternative Addiction Album of the Year	Nominated	
2010	"Celebrity Status"	Alternative Addiction Song of the Year	Nominated	
2010	Marianas Trench	Friend or Enemies Radio Awards Band of the Year	Nominated	
2011	"Celebrity Status"	INDIES.ca: Independent Music Awards Astral Media Radio Favourite Single	Won	
2011	Marianas Trench	INDIES.ca: Independent Music Awards Pop Artist / Group of the Year	Won	
2011	"Celebrity Status"	INDIES.ca: Independent Music Awards Video of the Year	Nominated	
2011	Marianas Trench	Canadian Radio Music Award Fans' Choice Award	Nominated	
2011	"Good to You" (feat. Jessica Lee)	MuchMusic Video Awards Pop Video of the Year	Nominated	
2011	"Good to You" (feat. Jessica Lee)	MuchMusic Video Awards Director of the Year	Nominated	
2011	"Good to You" (feat. Jessica Lee)	MuchMusic Video Awards Muchmusic.com Most Watched Video of the Year	Nominated	
2011	Marianas Trench	Urban Culture Conference Awards Best Vancouver Rock Artist / Band	Won	
2011	"Haven't Had Enough"	Alternative Addiction Song of the Year	Nominated	
2012	Ever After	Juno Pop Album of the Year	Nominated	
2012	"Haven't Had Enough"	INDIES.ca: Independent Music Awards Video of the Year	Won	
2012	"Fallout"	MuchMusic Video Awards UR Fave Video	Nominated	
2012	"Fallout"	MuchMusic Video Awards Video of the Year	Nominated	
2012	"Fallout"	MuchMusic Video Awards Post-Production of the Year	Nominated	
2012	"Fallout"	MuchMusic Video Awards Cinematography of the Year	Won	
2012	"Fallout"	MuchMusic Video Awards Most Watched Video of the Year	Nominated	
2012	"Haven't Had Enough"	MuchMusic Video Awards Pop Video of the Year	Won	
2012	"Haven't Had Enough"	MuchMusic Video Awards Director of the Year	Nominated	
2012	Marianas Trench	MuchMusic Video Awards UR Fave Artist / Group	Nominated	
2012	Ever After	Western Canadian Music Awards Pop Recording of the Year	Nominated	
2013	Ever After	INDIES.ca: Independent Music Awards Album of the Year	Nominated	
2013	"Fallout"	INDIES.ca: Independent Music Awards Single of the Year	Nominated	
2013	"Fallout"	INDIES.ca: Independent Music Awards Video of the Year	Won	
2013	Marianas Trench	INDIES.ca: Independent Music Awards Group of the Year	Nominated	
2013	Marianas Trench	INDIES.ca: Independent Music Awards Live Artist or Group of the Year	Nominated	
2013	Marianas Trench	INDIES.ca: Independent Music Awards Most Played Independent Artist or Group of the Year	Nominated	
2013	Marianas Trench	INDIES.ca: Independent Music Awards Highest Selling Independent Artist or Group of the Year	Nominated	
2013	Marianas Trench	INDIES.ca: Independent Music Awards Pop Artist or Group of the Year	Won	
2013	Marianas Trench	Juno Fan Choice	Nominated	
2013	Marianas Trench	Juno Group of the Year	Won	
2013	Ever After	Juno Album of the Year	Nominated	
2013	"Fallout"	Canadian Radio Music Awards SOCAN Song of the Year	Nominated	
2013	Marianas Trench	Canadian Radio Music Awards Fans' Choice	Won	
2013	"Desperate Measures"	MuchMusic Video Awards Video of the Year	Nominated	
2013	"Desperate Measures"	MuchMusic Video Awards Pop Video of the Year	Won	
2013	"Stutter"	MuchMusic Video Awards Director of the Year	Nominated	
2013	"Stutter"	MuchMusic Video Awards MuchFACT Video of the Year	Nominated	
2013	"Stutter"	MuchMusic Video Awards Your Fave Video	Won	
2013	Marianas Trench	MuchMusic Video Awards Your Fave Artist or Group	Nominated	
2013	Marianas Trench	Shorty Awards Best Band	Nominated	
2014	"Fallout"	SOCAN Awards Pop/Rock Music	Won	
2014	"Desperate Measures"	SOCAN Awards Pop/Rock Music	Won	
2015	"Here's to the Zeros"	MuchMusic Video Awards Fan Fave Video	Nominated	
2015	"Haven't Had Enough"	BDS Spin Certified Awards 40,000 spins	Won	
2016	Marianas Trench	Juno Group of the Year	Nominated	
2016	Marianas Trench	Alternative Press Music Awards Best International Band	Nominated	
2017	Astoria	Juno Pop Album of the Year	Nominated	
2017	Marianas Trench	INDIES.ca: Independent Music Awards Pop Artist or Group of the Year	Nominated	
