= Beside You (Marianas Trench song) =

Single by Marianas Trench

from the album Masterpiece Theatre
- Released: September 2, 2009
- Recorded: 2008
- Genre: Pop; classic rock
- Length: 3:38
- Label: 604
- Songwriter: Josh Ramsay
- Producer: Ramsay

Marianas Trench singles chronology
"All to Myself" (2009)	"Beside You" (2009)	"Celebrity Status" (2010)

Music video
- "Beside You" on YouTube

"Beside You" is a song by Canadian pop-rock group Marianas Trench. It was released from their second studio album Masterpiece Theatre. It was first released for digital download by 604 Records on February 24, 2009, as a promotional single. The song was later serviced to radio on September 2, 2009, as the third official single.

== Composition ==
"Beside You" incorporates 70s and 80s classic rock influence in its chorus harmonies. In contrast to the songs on the album Masterpiece Theatre, which make use of guitar riffs and a structure paired with a melodic chorus, the song instead uses instrumentals such as acoustic guitar, which results in a softer sound. The track runs at 75 BPM and is in the key of E major. Josh Ramsay's range in the song spans from the notes E3 to B4. Lyrically, the song describes a relationship on how one would do anything to protect the person the individual loves.

== Music video ==
The music video for "Beside You" was shot on September 29, 2009. The beginning shots of the beach and dock were filmed at Jericho Beach in Vancouver, British Columbia. The rest of the video was shot inside of the Chan Centre for the Performing Arts at the University of British Columbia. The orchestra band members in the video are students from Lord Byng Secondary School.

"Beside You" premiered on Much Music's MuchOnDemand on October 30, 2009. The song reached number one on the MuchMusic Countdown. The video was also added to mtvU rotation on March 28, 2011.

== Charts ==
=== Weekly charts ===
Weekly chart performance for "Beside You"
Chart (2009–2011)	Peak position
Canada (Canadian Hot 100)	27
Canada AC (Billboard)	32
Canada CHR/Top 40 (Billboard)	15
Canada Hot AC (Billboard)	11

=== Year-end chart ===
Year-end chart performance for "Beside You"
Chart (2010)	Position
Canadian Hot 100	64

== Certifications ==
Certifications and sales for "Beside You"
Region	Certification	Certified units/sales
Canada (Music Canada)	2× Platinum	160,000^{‡}
^{‡} Sales+streaming figures based on certification alone.

== Release history ==
Release dates and formats for "Beside You"
Region	Date	Format	Label	Ref.
Canada	February 24, 2009	Digital download	604 Records	
Canada	September 2, 2009	Contemporary hit radio	604 Records	
United States	March 2011	Contemporary hit radio	604 Records	
