= Decided to Break It =

Single by Marianas Trench

from the album Fix Me
- Released: October 3, 2006
- Genre: Pop punk
- Length: 2:23
- Label: 604
- Songwriter: Josh Ramsay
- Producers: Ramsay; Warne Livesey

Marianas Trench singles chronology
"Say Anything" (2006)	"Decided to Break It" (2006)	"Shake Tramp" (2007)

Music video
- "Decided to Break It" on YouTube

"Decided to Break It" is a song by Canadian pop rock band Marianas Trench. It was released on October 3, 2006, as the second single from their debut studio album Fix Me. The song was featured in an episode of Degrassi: The Next Generation.

== Background and composition ==
"Decided to Break It" is a pop punk track, written and produced by Josh Ramsay, as well as being co-produced by Warne Livesey. It was written about Ramsay's recovery as an addict, which resulted in insomnia and contains themes of disappointment and self-loathing. He spoke about the song in further detail with UWO Gazette stating, "Basically ['Decided to Break It'] was a stream of consciousness sort of writing, because at that time I was trying so hard to fall asleep and I just couldn't. At the end of it, when I say 'I decided to break it,' I'm trying to refer to trying to break this cycle of never sleeping, which is a bit of a silly line in some respects because it's kind of not in your control anyway."

== Chart performance ==
After receiving substantial radio airplay in Canada and success on MuchMusic rotation, "Decided to Break It" reached number 14 on the Canadian Singles Chart.

== Music video ==
The music video for "Decided to Break It" premiered on MuchMusic in 2006, and was directed by Kyle Davison and Chris Sargent. The video showcases the group training for a competition in race against rival team, the Spider Pirates. According to Ramsay, during the video shoot he suffered a broken wrist.

== Personnel ==
Credits adapted from album's liner notes.

Marianas Trench

- Josh Ramsay – lead vocals, rhythm guitar
- Matt Webb – lead guitar, backing vocals
- Mike Ayley – bass guitar, backing vocals
- Ian Casselman – drums, backing vocals

Production

- Josh Ramsay – producer
- Warne Livesey – producer
- Mike Fraser – engineering, mixing

== Charts ==
Chart performance for "Decided to Break It"
Chart (2006)	Peak position
Canadian Singles Chart (Nielsen Soundscan)	14

== Release history ==
Release dates and formats for "Decided to Break It"
Region	Date	Format	Label	Ref.
Canada	October 3, 2006	Digital download	604 Records	
