= Good to You =

2010 single by Marianas Trench

Single by Marianas Trench featuring Jessica Lee or Kate Voegele

from the album Masterpiece Theatre
- Released: September 21, 2010
- Genre: Neon pop-punk
- Length: 3:05
- Label: 604 Records
- Songwriters: Josh Ramsay; Shawn Smith
- Producers: Dave Genn; Dave Ogilvie; Greig Nori

Marianas Trench singles chronology
"Celebrity Status" (2010)	"Good to You" (2010)	"Haven't Had Enough" (2011)

Music video
- "Good to You" on YouTube

"Good to You" is a song by Canadian pop punk group Marianas Trench. It was released on September 21, 2010, as the fifth single from their second studio album Masterpiece Theatre. The single version features Jessica Lee while the album version features Kate Voegele. It peaked at number 38 on the Canadian Hot 100 chart and is certified double platinum in Canada.

== Background ==
In 2010, the band held a contest for fans to send in a video of them singing "Good to You" and the winner would perform with them on stage in Toronto, Ontario at Massey Hall. The eventual winner was Jessica Lee who was featured on the single version of "Good to You". In September 2009, Ramsay performed the song with Kate Voegele on the Canadian TV series The Next Star.

In 2011, the song was nominated for three awards at the MuchMusic Video Awards: "Pop Video of the Year", "Director of the Year" and "Most Watched Video of the Year".

== Music video ==
The music video for "Good to You" was shot on May 19, 2010, in New Westminster, British Columbia. It premiered on MuchMusic on September 16, 2010. The video was later released via VEVO on September 22, 2010, and was directed by Colin Minihan.

== Awards and nominations ==
Awards and nominations for "Good to You"
Year	Organization	Award	Result	Ref(s)
2011	MuchMusic Video Awards	Director of the Year	Nominated	
2011	MuchMusic Video Awards	Pop Video of the Year	Nominated	
2011	MuchMusic Video Awards	Most Watched Video of the Year	Nominated	

== Charts ==
Chart performance for "Good to You"
Chart (2010–11)	Peak position
Canada (Canadian Hot 100)	38
Canada AC (Billboard)	49
Canada CHR/Top 40 (Billboard)	22
Canada Hot AC (Billboard)	14

== Certifications ==
Certifications and sales for "Good to You"
Region	Certification	Certified units/sales
Canada (Music Canada)	2× Platinum	160,000^{‡}
^{‡} Sales+streaming figures based on certification alone.
