= Mark Maryanovich =

Canadian photographer

Mark Maryanovich is a Canadian photographer and artist. He is known primarily for his photography in the music industry.

== Biography ==
Born in Windsor, Ontario and raised in Kamloops, British Columbia, Maryanovich relocated to Montreal, Quebec in 1995, where he met and was mentored by fashion photographer Raphael Mazzucco. In 1996, Maryanovich's career as a photographer began in Vancouver, British Columbia, and over the next fifteen years he shot with various artists such as Colin James, Gordie Johnson (Big Sugar), Tom Wilson (Junkhouse), Ryan Dahle (Limblifter, Age of Electric) and The Tea Party.

His photography has been used by artists such as Terraplane Sun, Marianas Trench (604 Records) and Grammy Award winners 54*40.

One of his images was used on the cover of Randy Bachman's autobiography Vinyl Tap Stories. In 2012, he received a Canadian Country Music Award for Album Design of the Year for Dean Brody's Dirt. He also received the award in 2009 for George Canyon's What I Do.

In 2011, Maryanovich relocated to Santa Monica, California where he currently resides.
