= Masterpiece Theatre (Marianas Trench album) =

Studio album by Marianas Trench
- Released: February 24, 2009
- Recorded: 2008–2009
- Studio: Armoury Studios (Vancouver); Mushroom Studios (Vancouver); The Farm (Vancouver); Kingnoise (Los Angeles); Hipposonic Studios (Vancouver); The Umbrella Factory (Vancouver); The Warehouse Studio (Vancouver)
- Genre: Pop punk; emo pop; symphonic rock
- Length: 45:41
- Label: 604
- Producer: Dave Genn; Greig Nori; Dave Ogilvie; Raine Maida; Josh Ramsay

Marianas Trench chronology
Fix Me (2006)	Masterpiece Theatre (2009)	Ever After (2011)

Singles from Masterpiece Theatre
- 1. "Cross My Heart" Released: November 24, 2008; 2. "All to Myself" Released: February 24, 2009; 3. "Beside You" Released: September 2, 2009; 4. "Celebrity Status" Released: February 12, 2010; 5. "Good to You" Released: September 21, 2010

Masterpiece Theatre is the second studio album by Canadian rock group Marianas Trench. It was released on February 24, 2009, in Canada and September 28, 2010, in the United States. The album was available for preview at MuchMusic's website before the release.

The album is a slight departure from the band's debut album Fix Me, containing more theatrical elements and instruments while still retaining the punk rock influence of its predecessor. The songs "Masterpiece Theatre" (I, II, and III), "Beside You", and "Good to You" show some experimentation using pianos, strings, and harmonies. The closing track, "Masterpiece Theatre III", is a medley of all the songs on the album.

== Background and recording ==
Following the release of their debut studio album Fix Me released in 2006, lead singer Josh Ramsay said to UWO Gazette about working on the next album, "Let's face it: you've had your whole life to write your first album, and realistically you have a year and a half to write your second album. We've got a lot of good material and I think that the second one will be even better than the first one."

Masterpiece Theatre is a concept album that experiments with different genres ranging from pop punk, symphonic rock, and emo pop. Bassist Mike Ayley said that the album was "meant to be listened in it's [sic] entirety," citing a certain theme that ties the record together. "Masterpiece Theatre I" serves as the album's intro, whereas "Masterpiece Theatre II" is a "symphonic reprise that occurs at the beginning of act II" and "Masterpiece Theatre III" is the "climax of the album," a melody touching on all of the songs on the album. The group re-wrote the title track twice, before including it on the album. Displaying the band's musical diversity, the album features the upbeat tracks such as "Cross My Heart" and "All to Myself" to the softer ballads, "Good to You" and "Beside You". The eleventh track, "Lover Dearest" was written as a reflection of Ramsay's struggle with addiction.

The album was recorded at Armoury Studios, Mushroom Studios, Hipposonic Studios, The Umbrella Factory and The Warehouse Studio in Vancouver, British Columbia and at Kingnoise in Los Angeles, California. The album featured production work by Dave Genn, Greig Nori, Dave Ogilvie, Raine Maida and Josh Ramsay.

Leading up to the release of Masterpiece Theatre, the band premiered "Cross My Heart" on their MySpace page on November 14, 2008. The group also posted 5 videos to countdown its release in February 2009. The album was available for preview on the MuchMusic website before the release. It was officially released on February 24, 2009, in Canada via 604 Records. The album was later released in the United States on September 28, 2010. A vinyl press of the album was released in the United States on November 12, 2013, and in Canada on November 26.

== Promotion ==
In the fall of 2009, the band embarked on the Beside You tour in support of the album with support from Carly Rae Jepsen. The group also toured the US in early 2010. They also toured across Canada again later that year. In July 2010, the band performed at the Cisco Ottawa Bluesfest.

== Singles ==
"Cross My Heart" was released on November 24, 2008, as the album's lead single for digital download. The song peaked at number 15 on the Canadian Hot 100. It also reached number 11 on the Canada CHR/Top 40 and number 12 on the Canada Hot AC charts.

"All to Myself" was released as the album's second single on February 24, 2009. The song peaked at number 11 on the Canadian Hot 100, number 8 on the Canada CHR/Top 40 and number 12 on the Canada Hot AC charts.

"Beside You" was released as the third single from the album, being issued to contemporary hit radio on September 2, 2009. It peaked at number 27 on the Canadian Hot 100. The song also peaked at numbers 32, 15, and 11, respectively, on the Canada AC, Canada CHR/Top 40, and Canada Hot AC airplay charts.

"Celebrity Status" was released on February 12, 2010, as the album's fourth single. The song peaked at number 24 on the Canadian Hot 100, as well as the Canada CHR/Top 40 at number 32, and Canada Hot AC at number 17.

"Good to You" was released on September 21, 2010, as the fifth and final single from the album. The single version features Jessica Lee, opposed to the album version which features Kate Voegele. It peaked at number 38 on the Canadian Hot 100. The song also reached numbers 49, 22, and 14, respectively, on the Canada AC, Canada CHR/Top 40, and Canada Hot AC charts.

== Reception ==
=== Critical reception ===
Professional ratings
Review scores
Source	Rating
AllMusic	4/5 stars
Alternative Addiction	4/5 stars
Lost in the Sound	4/5 stars
Melodic	5/5 stars
Sputnikmusic	3.5/5 stars

Masterpiece Theatre was received well by most critics. The Phoenix New Times praised lead singer Josh Ramsay and the lyrics saying "Singer Josh Ramsay pushed himself vocally on this album, and the lyrics were very heartfelt and meaningful – not your typical pop-punk music."

Matthew Chisling of AllMusic stated, "The group has truly created an excellent concept album, experimenting with a nice variety of musical mediums that complements the bands sound quite well." He called the "Masterpiece Theatre" parts, "welcome songs that sound like the Broadway rendition of the perfectly crafted emo-pop tune." He described tracks such as "Acadia" and "Celebrity Status" as mainstream complements that stop the album from feeling too erratic and stated that Masterpiece Theatre "could do without 'Good to You'." He ended his review remarking, "this album truly stands out from the pack by bringing something truly different and exciting to the table that's bound to earn them plenty of fans and plenty of success."

Alternative Addiction praised the melodies and the harmonies, as well as Ramsay's vocals calling them "incredible" and "addictive." He also added, "Masterpiece Theatre takes an album theme, some great songs, and the talents of Ramsay and utilizes every one of those to make a masterpiece for fans of the genre."

Nick Anastasia of Melodic.net said, "this album is one of the best, if not the best, discs I've heard in the past year or two." He also said "The harmonies, arrangements, and different styles experimented with throughout the spread of the CD are absolutely awe-inspiring."

Kevin Miao of Lost In the Sound gave the album a score of 80% out 100, saying that the album "is one of the best in its genre and proves that there is still good pop rock music out there."

Sputnikmusic wrote, "Marianas Trench takes a brave step with this sophomore album [...] the band has chosen not to go too far into a showman-type of pretense – overtly political lyrics, odd metaphors, and musical attempts that they just couldn't have possibly done - its fair to say they fall into the latter category and succeed for the most part. The ballads here are a bit too syrupy however, and as a alluded to above, Josh's vocals are an acquired taste. As far as a general appeal to listeners, that's really all that hold's this band back though. It will be interesting to see how the boys choose to follow up this pop punk opera."

=== Commercial performance ===
The album sold 5,000 copies in its first week of release debuting at No. 4 on the Canadian Albums Chart. The album has since sold over 240,000 copies in Canada and was certified Triple Platinum by Music Canada.

== Awards and nominations ==
Awards and nominations for Masterpiece Theatre
Year	Organization	Award	Result	Ref(s)
2009	Western Canadian Music Awards	Pop Recording of the Year	Won	

=== Accolades ===
Year	Publication	Country	List	Rank	Ref(s)
2010	Alternative Addiction	United States	"The 20 Best Albums of 2010"	2	

== Track listing ==
All tracks are written by Josh Ramsay, except where noted.

No.	Title	Writer(s)	Producer(s)	Length
1.	"Masterpiece Theatre I"		Josh Ramsay	5:00
2.	"All to Myself"		Dave Genn	3:11
3.	"Cross My Heart"		Genn	3:11
4.	"Beside You"		Greig Nori	3:36
5.	"Acadia"		Dave "Rave" Ogilvie	3:18
6.	"Masterpiece Theatre II"		Ramsay	3:32
7.	"Sing Sing"		Nori	3:15
8.	"Good to You" (featuring Kate Voegele)	Ramsay; Shawn Smith	Raine Maida	3:04
9.	"Celebrity Status"		Ogilvie	3:06
10.	"Perfect"		Maida	3:03
11.	"Lover Dearest"		Ramsay	4:03
12.	"Masterpiece Theatre III"		Ramsay	6:40

American release bonus tracks
No.	Title	Length
13.	"Cross My Heart" (Acoustic)	3:28
14.	"Good to You" (featuring Jessica Lee)	3:04
15.	"Fix Me"	3:56

Director's Cut Edition bonus tracks
No.	Title	Writer(s)	Length
13.	"Good to You" (feat. Jessica Lee)		3:04
14.	"Cross My Heart" (Acoustic)		3:27
15.	"Celebrity Status" (Acoustic)		3:57
16.	"And So It Goes"	Billy Joel	2:23

== Personnel ==
Credits for Masterpiece Theatre adapted from AllMusic and album's liner notes.

=== Musicians ===
Marianas Trench

- Josh Ramsay – lead vocals, rhythm guitar, piano, keyboards, programming, flugelhorn, string arrangements, guitar and bass engineering (2, 3, 7, 11), additional drums (9)
- Matt Webb – lead guitar, piano, keyboards, programming, trombone, vocals
- Mike Ayley – bass guitar, trumpet, vocals
- Ian Casselman – drums, sousaphone, percussion, vocals

Guest musicians

- Joshua Belvedere – viola
- Doug Gorkoff – cello
- Gillian Mott – violin
- Elyse Jacobson – violin
- Rick Killburn – double bass (4)
- Shane Wilson – additional drums (9), drum technician
- Kate Voegele – additional vocals (8)
- Steve Marshall – additional vocals (5)
- Miles Ramsay – string arrangements, additional vocals (12)
- Sara Ramsay – additional vocals (12)
- Corlynn Ramsay – additional vocals (12)
- Dave Genn – additional keyboards (2)
- John Stamos – brass horn technician
- Jessica Lee – vocals

=== Production ===
- Dave Genn – engineering (2, 3)
- Raine Maida – engineering (8, 10)
- Greig Nori – engineering (4, 7)
- Dave Ogilvie – mixing (2, 5, 6, 8, 9, 12)
- Mike Fraser – mixing (1, 4, 7, 10, 11)
- Ted Jensen – mastering
- Scott Ternan – drum, piano, guitar, bass, and string engineering (1, 5, 6, 9)
- Dean Maher – drum and piano engineering (2–4, 7, 11)
- Mark Maryanovich – cover art, photography
- Natalie Simon – stylist
- Jonathan Simkin – A&R
- Zack Blacktone – assistant
- Brendon Brown – assistant
- Mike Cashin – assistant
- Andrew Conroy – assistant
- Brock MacFarlane – assistant
- Eric Mosher – assistant
- Jeremy Patch – assistant
- Dusty Schaller – assistant
- Rob Stefanson – assistant

== Charts ==
=== Weekly charts ===
Weekly chart performance for Masterpiece Theatre
Chart (2009)	Peak position
Canadian Albums (Billboard)	4

=== Year end charts ===
Year-end performance for Masterpiece Theatre
Chart (2009)	Peak position
Canadian Albums (Nielsen SoundScan)	113

== Certifications ==
Certifications and sales for Masterpiece Theatre
Region	Certification	Certified units/sales
Canada (Music Canada)	3× Platinum	240,000^{‡}
^{‡} Sales+streaming figures based on certification alone.

== Release history ==
Release dates and formats for Masterpiece Theatre
Region	Date	Version	Format	Label	Ref.
Canada	February 24, 2009	Standard	CD; digital download	604 Records	
United States	September 28, 2010	Standard	CD; digital download	604 Records	
Canada	November 30, 2010	Director's Cut (Special Edition)	CD; digital download	604 Records	
United States	November 30, 2010	Director's Cut (Special Edition)	CD; digital download	604 Records	
