= Stutter (Marianas Trench song) =

Single by Marianas Trench

from the album Ever After
- Released: December 4, 2012
- Recorded: 2011
- Genre: Gospel; pop
- Length: 3:21
- Label: 604
- Songwriter(s): Josh Ramsay
- Producer(s): Ramsay

Marianas Trench singles chronology
"Desperate Measures" (2012)	"Stutter" (2012)	"By Now" (2013)

Music video
- "Stutter" on YouTube

"Stutter" is a song by Canadian pop rock band Marianas Trench. It was released to radio airplay on December 4, 2012, as the fourth single from their third studio album Ever After. The song peaked on the Canadian Hot 100 chart at number 28 and was certified double platinum in Canada in October 2016.

== Background and composition ==
"Stutter" was written and produced by Josh Ramsay. The song is a gospel-inspired track with elements of pop music. Through a series of studio updates on their YouTube page for the making of Ever After, the band released a recording session of the gospel choir singing the song in 2011.

The song earned three nominations at the 2013 MuchMusic Video Awards for Director of the Year, MuchFact Video of the Year and Your Fave Video of the Year.

== Live performances ==
The band performed the song live at the 101st Grey Cup in 2012.

== Awards and nominations ==
Awards and nominations for "Stutter"
Year	Organization	Award	Result	Ref(s)
2013	MuchMusic Video Awards	Director of the Year	Nominated	
2013	MuchMusic Video Awards	MuchFact Video of the Year	Nominated	
2013	MuchMusic Video Awards	Your Fave Video of the Year	Won	

== Music video ==
The music video for "Stutter" was shot in downtown New Westminster, British Columbia on November 14, 2012. The music video is a 1940s swing dance themed video. A 20-second teaser video was released on December 14, 2012, and is a continuation of a five-part video storyline for Ever After. The video premiered on MuchMusic Top 10 on December 17.

== Charts ==
=== Weekly charts ===
Weekly chart performance for "Stutter"
Chart (2012–13)	Peak position
Canada (Canadian Hot 100)	28
Canada AC (Billboard)	37
Canada CHR/Top 40 (Billboard)	20
Canada Hot AC (Billboard)	13

=== Year-end chart ===
Year-end chart performance for "Stutter"
Chart (2013)	Position
Canada (Canadian Hot 100)	82

== Certifications ==
Certifications and sales for "Stutter"
Region	Certification	Certified units/sales
Canada (Music Canada)	3× Platinum	240,000^{‡}
^{‡} Sales+streaming figures based on certification alone.
