= Haven't Had Enough =

Single by Marianas Trench

from the album Ever After
- Released: July 19, 2011
- Recorded: 2011
- Genre: Pop; pop rock
- Length: 3:28 (album version); 3:38 (radio edit)
- Label: 604
- Songwriter: Josh Ramsay
- Producer: Josh Ramsay

Marianas Trench singles chronology
"Good to You" (2010)	"Haven't Had Enough" (2011)	"Fallout" (2011)

Music video
- "Haven't Had Enough" on YouTube

"Haven't Had Enough" is a song recorded by Canadian pop punk band Marianas Trench for their third studio album, Ever After (2011). It was released July 19, 2011 as the album's lead single.

The song debuted at No. 9 on the Canadian Hot 100 for the week of August 6, 2011, the highest debut by Marianas Trench and the band's first top ten hit on the chart. It was also a radio hit, reaching a peak of 24 and 13, respectively, on the Nielsen Broadcast Data Systems Canada CHR and Hot AC surveys. The song was certified Platinum by Music Canada in December 2011 and was later certified 3× Platinum in March 2023.

== Background and composition ==
In an interview with Alternative Addiction in March 2011, lead singer Josh Ramsay said they had begun recording songs for their third album with a planned release date for the fall and that a single had been completed, with an expected release for the summer. The single was announced to be "Haven't Had Enough". The band released a couple of teasers of the song via their YouTube channel prior to the release of the single.

"Haven't Had Enough" is primarily a pop song, with additional influences of pop rock guitars and 80's funk. It was written and produced solely by Marianas Trench lead singer Josh Ramsay. The Magazine called the song "somewhat different" from their previous material, but noted that it still has a distinctive "Marianas Trench feel".

The song earned the band, MTV Push Artist of the Week on January 30, 2012.

== Music video ==
A music video for the song was filmed on July 20 in Burnaby, British Columbia. A teaser for the video was released on August 8, 2011. The music video premiered on MuchMusic on August 25, 2011, and was uploaded to the band's official Vevo channel the next day on August 26. Directed by Kyle Davison, it is the first chapter in a five-video storyline accompanying the album's backstory, and is followed by "Fallout". Speaking about the storyline in the video for "Haven't Had Enough", drummer Ian Casselman stated, "it had to do with us getting caught in a weird toy land and being controlled by this queen and we're sort of her puppets."

== Awards and nominations ==
Awards and nominations for "Haven't Had Enough"
Year	Award	Nomination	Result	Ref.
2012	Independent Music Awards	Video of the Year	Nominated	
2012	MuchMusic Video Awards	Pop Video of the Year	Won	
2012	MuchMusic Video Awards	Director of the Year	Nominated	
2015	BDS Spin Certified Awards	40,000 spins	Won	

=== Accolades ===
Publication	Country	Accolade	Year	Rank	Ref(s)
Alternative Addiction	United States	Song of the Year	2011	11	

== Track listing ==
CD single
No.	Title	Length
1.	"Haven't Had Enough" (radio edit)	3:38
2.	"Haven't Had Enough" (album version)	3:28

== Charts ==
=== Weekly charts ===
Weekly chart performance for "Haven't Had Enough"
Chart (2011)	Peak position
Canada (Canadian Hot 100)	9
Canada AC (Billboard)	34
Canada CHR/Top 40 (Billboard)	24
Canada Hot AC (Billboard)	13

=== Year-end chart ===
Year-end chart performance for "Haven't Had Enough"
Chart (2011)	Position
Canada (Canadian Hot 100)	81

== Certifications ==
Certifications and sales for "Haven't Had Enough"
Region	Certification	Certified units/sales
Canada (Music Canada)	3× Platinum	240,000^{‡}
^{‡} Sales+streaming figures based on certification alone.
