= All to Myself (Marianas Trench song) =

Single by Marianas Trench

from the album Masterpiece Theatre
- Released: February 24, 2009
- Length: 3:11
- Label: 604
- Songwriter(s): Josh Ramsay
- Producer(s): Dave Genn

Marianas Trench singles chronology
"Cross My Heart" (2008)	"All to Myself" (2009)	"Beside You" (2009)

Music video
- "All to Myself" on YouTube

"All to Myself" is a song by Canadian pop rock band Marianas Trench. It was released on February 24, 2009, as the second single from their second studio album Masterpiece Theatre. The song peaked at number 11 on the Canadian Hot 100 and was certified triple platinum by Music Canada.

== Background and composition ==
"All to Myself" was written by Josh Ramsay and produced by Dave Genn. The track was mixed at The Warehouse Studio in Vancouver, by Dave Ogilvie and was mastered at Sterling Sound in New York City, by Ted Jensen.

The song is an upbeat track; about "making your intentions clear [...] to express what you want."

== Music video ==
The music video for "All to Myself" was released on May 22, 2009, and was added to MuchMusic rotation. It was directed by Colin Minihan and Tony Mirza. The video was shot in an office setting and had its behind the scenes video released on May 27. The video reached number four on the MuchMusic Countdown.

== Chart performance ==
"All to Myself" became a commercial hit, gaining mass radio airplay and online plays. The song debuted at number 96 on the Canadian Hot 100 for the week of March 14, 2009. The song peaked at number 11 and remained on the chart for 27 weeks. The song peaked at number eight on the Billboard Canada CHR/Top 40. On the Billboard Canadian Hot 100 year-end chart of 2009, it ranked at number 46.

== Personnel ==
Credits for "All to Myself" adapted from album's liner notes.

Marianas Trench

- Josh Ramsay – lead vocals, rhythm guitar
- Matt Webb – lead guitar, backing vocals
- Mike Ayley – bass guitar, backing vocals
- Ian Casselman – drums, backing vocals

Production

- Dave Genn – production, engineering
- Dave Ogilvie – mixing
- Ted Jensen – mastering

== Charts ==
=== Weekly charts ===
Weekly chart performance for "All to Myself"
Chart (2009)	Peak position
Canada (Canadian Hot 100)	11
Canada CHR/Top 40 (Billboard)	8
Canada Hot AC (Billboard)	12

=== Year-end charts ===
Year-end chart performance for "All to Myself"
Chart (2009)	Position
Canada (Canadian Hot 100)	46

== Certifications ==
Certifications and sales for "All to Myself"
Region	Certification	Certified units/sales
Canada (Music Canada)	3× Platinum	240,000^{‡}
^{‡} Sales+streaming figures based on certification alone.
