= Lightning and Thunder (song) =

Single by Marianas Trench

from the album Haven
- Released: May 24, 2024
- Genre: Glam rock
- Length: 3:27
- Label: 604
- Songwriter: Josh Ramsay
- Producer: Ramsay

Marianas Trench singles chronology
"A Normal Life" (2024)	"Lightning and Thunder" (2024)	"I'm Not Getting Better" (2024)

Music video
- "Lightning and Thunder" on YouTube

"Lightning and Thunder" is a song by Canadian pop rock band Marianas Trench. It was released on May 24, 2024, as the second single from the group's sixth studio album, Haven, via 604 Records.

== Background ==
In May 2024, the group began teasing "Lightning and Thunder" via social media, before it was officially released on May 24. Josh Ramsay stated that the song came about after finding out him and his partner were going to have their first child and noted, "Every story begins with a call to adventure." It was the first song the group performed live from Haven.

== Composition ==
"Lightning and Thunder" was written and produced by Josh Ramsay. The song is described as glam rock, adding a layer of synthesizer as the track's main melody, as well as showcasing Ramsay's versatile vocal range.

== Critical reception ==
Nick Anastasia of Melodic praised the track's "mainstream appeal while still maintaining the honest, raw lyricism the band is known for." Zee Caine of New Noise Magazine noted the similarities of the intros between the track and the previous single "A Normal Life", but stated "the only difference is that there's more kick drum within this track at the start. The vocals are much lower, and it's something that fits Matt Webb's vocal range better than the higher register that was used within a few other songs within the record. It's definitely a great track because the kick drum feels like thunder, and it makes the title feel fitting."

== Chart performance ==
"Lightning and Thunder" debuted on the Billboard Canada Hot AC chart at number 37. The song later peaked at number 11. The song also debuted at number 40 on the Billboard Canada CHR/Top 40 and peaked at number 38 on the chart.

== Music video ==
On July 23, 2024, the group premiered the music video for "Lightning and Thunder" via VEVO and was directed by Ben Knechtel.

== Personnel ==
Credits for "Lightning and Thunder" adapted from album's liner notes.

Marianas Trench

- Josh Ramsay – lead vocals, rhythm guitar
- Matt Webb – lead guitar, backing vocals
- Mike Ayley – bass guitar, backing vocals
- Ian Casselman – drums, backing vocals

Production

- Josh Ramsay – producer
- Dave Ogilvie – mixing

== Charts ==
Chart performance for "Lightning and Thunder"
Chart (2024)	Peak position
Canada CHR/Top 40 (Billboard)	38
Canada Hot AC (Billboard)	11

== Release history ==
Release dates and formats for "Lightning and Thunder"
Region	Date	Format	Label	Ref.
Various	May 24, 2024	Digital download; streaming	604 Records	
Canada	June 10, 2024	Adult contemporary	604 Records	
