= Shake Tramp =

Single by Marianas Trench

from the album Fix Me
- Released: September 2007
- Genre: Punk rock
- Length: 3:35
- Label: 604
- Songwriter(s): Josh Ramsay
- Producer(s): Dave Genn

Marianas Trench singles chronology
"Decided to Break It" (2006)	"Shake Tramp" (2007)	"Cross My Heart" (2008)

Music video
- "Shake Tramp" on YouTube

"Shake Tramp" is a song by Canadian pop punk group Marianas Trench. It was released in September 2007, as the third single from their debut studio album Fix Me. The song reached number 65 on the Canadian Hot 100 and the #1 spot on the MuchMusic Countdown of Friday, August 10, 2007. The song was also featured on an episode of Video on Trial.

== Composition ==
The song was written by lead singer Josh Ramsay and was produced by Dave Genn. The song runs at 162 BPM and is in the key of B major. The song is described as their "breakthrough single" however, some criticized the lyric, "they slap you like a bitch and you take it like a whore," as uncomfortable.

== Awards and nominations ==
Awards and nominations for "Shake Tramp"
Year	Organization	Award	Result	Ref(s)
2007	SOCAN Awards	No. 1 Song	Won	
2008	Juno Awards	Video of the Year	Nominated	

== Music video ==
The music video for "Shake Tramp" was released in 2007, and was directed by Kyle Davison. It begins with a montage of all the members of the band singing the beginning harmonies. The camera focus is then directed to lead singer Josh Ramsay walking down a street (filmed in Burnaby Village Museum, Burnaby, B.C.) set in the early 20th century. He interacts and socializes with the people, all of whom appear to love him. This section ends with Ramsay accidentally getting hit in the face by a man (Biji) carrying a ladder. He collapses and blacks out. When he wakes up Ramsay is on the same street, but in current time. He is still dancing and trying to interact with the same people, however this time they treat him harshly. A woman he danced with in the last segment, sprays him in the eyes with pepper spray. As he walks around the town, more people begin to insult him until he finally arrives in an outdoor mosh. The rest of the band (Matt, Mike and Ian) are playing here, and as he joins them for the last chorus. Their music is received well and the townspeople are dancing along. It appears to go back to the time period used in the beginning of the video, with the exception of the members of the band who are dressed in modern apparel.

The video was shot in one day, where the group spent 20 hours filiming it. There are many choreographed dance sequences performed by Ramsay throughout the video which he stated he had to take 2 months of dance instruction to prepare for. The music video was nominated at the 2008 Juno Awards for "Video of the Year".

== Charts ==
Chart performance for "Shake Tramp"
Chart (2007)	Peak position
Canada (Canadian Hot 100)	65
Canada CHR/Top 40 (Billboard)	25

== Certifications ==
Certifications and sales for "Shake Tramp"
Region	Certification	Certified units/sales
Canada (Music Canada)	Platinum	80,000^{‡}
^{‡} Sales+streaming figures based on certification alone.
