= Desperate Measures (song) =

Single by Marianas Trench

from the album Ever After
- Released: July 4, 2012
- Genre: Power pop
- Length: 3:45
- Label: 604
- Songwriter(s): Josh Ramsay
- Producer(s): Josh Ramsay

Marianas Trench singles chronology
| "Fallout" (2011) | "Desperate Measures" (2012) | "Stutter" (2012) |

Music video
- "Desperate Measures" on YouTube

"Desperate Measures" is a song by Canadian pop rock band Marianas Trench. It was released on July 4, 2012, as the third single from their third studio album Ever After. The song peaked on the Canadian Hot 100 chart at number 20 on the week of August 11, 2012, and was certified triple platinum in Canada in March 2023.

== Background ==
The track was written and produced by Josh Ramsay. MTV described "Desperate Measures" as a power pop song. The song earned 2 nominations at the 2013 MuchMusic Video Awards for "Video of the Year" and "Pop Video of the Year". They also performed the song at the award show. The performance was choreographed by Nicole Arbour.

In 2025, this song was used on the eighth episode of the fifth season of Canada's Drag Race as a lip sync battle between Makayla Couture and Perla.

== Awards and nominations ==
Awards and nominations for "Desperate Measures"
| Year | Organization | Award | Result | Ref(s) |
|---|---|---|---|---|
| 2013 | MuchMusic Video Awards | Video of the Year | Nominated | |
| 2013 | MuchMusic Video Awards | Pop Video of the Year | Won | |
| 2014 | SOCAN Awards | Pop/Rock Music Award | Won | |

== Music video ==
The music video for "Desperate Measures" was released on July 4, 2012. It was directed by Kyle Davison and it is the follow-up from the "Fallout" music video of a five-video storyline accompanying the backstory of their album Ever After. The storyline finds the band under a spell and is being controlled by a woman who created voodoo dolls of the band. The video makes references to Risky Business and features an interpretation of Toy Story. Towards the end of the video, the group manages to break the spell and escape, amidst of a flash mob.

== Charts ==
=== Weekly charts ===
Weekly chart performance for "Desperate Measures"
| Chart (2012) | Peak position |
|---|---|
| Canada (Canadian Hot 100) | 20 |
| Canada CHR/Top 40 (Billboard) | 17 |
| Canada Hot AC (Billboard) | 9 |

=== Year-end chart ===
Year-end chart performance for "Desperate Measures"
| Chart (2012) | Position |
|---|---|
| Canada (Canadian Hot 100) | 62 |

== Certifications ==
Certifications and sales for "Desperate Measures"
| Region | Certification | Certified units/sales |
|---|---|---|
| Canada (Music Canada) | 3× Platinum | 240,000^{‡} |
^{‡} Sales+streaming figures based on certification alone.
