= Fallout (Marianas Trench song) =

Single by Marianas Trench

from the album Ever After
- Released: November 14, 2011
- Recorded: 2011
- Genre: Pop rock
- Length: 4:23 (album version); 4:11 (single version)
- Label: 604
- Songwriter(s): Josh Ramsay
- Producer(s): Josh Ramsay

Marianas Trench singles chronology
"Haven't Had Enough" (2011)	"Fallout" (2011)	"Desperate Measures" (2012)

Music video
- "Fallout" on YouTube

"Fallout" is a song by Canadian pop punk band Marianas Trench. It was released on November 14, 2011, as the second single from their third studio album, Ever After (2011). The song has peaked in the Top 40 on the Billboard Canadian Hot 100 and been certified Gold by Music Canada. In March 2023, "Fallout" was certified Triple Platinum.

== Composition ==
"Fallout" is a pop rock song with a duration of four minutes and ten seconds. Its instrumentation consists primarily of drums and guitar, while its "krushed groove" and vocal arrangement have been described by CBC Music as having an R&B influence. The song's lyrics describe the pain of losing someone you love to another person.

== Critical reception ==
Boris Canzano at Sputnikmusic praised "Fallout" in his review of Ever After, writing "The best track on Ever After, 'Fallout'... proves that Marianas Trench can take a pop cliché and mold it into something truly moving and meaningful." Catherine Yi at Pupfresh felt that "Fallout" was a "catchy, pleasing song" with strong radio potential, but that it offered too little musical or lyrically variation throughout.

== Music video ==
The music video premiered on February 2, 2012 on MuchMusic. It is the second in a five-part video storyline, following "Haven't Had Enough" and continuing into "Desperate Measures". The video was shot in Vancouver at the end of December 2011, by director Kyle Davison.

=== Synopsis ===
The video starts with Josh Ramsay breaking up with his girlfriend (Darla Taylor) in an open minefield. She drives away, leaving him with a traditional-style key. As soon as she disappears, multiple explosions occur around Josh, who runs but eventually passes out. The other band members arrive near the end of the video and wake him up. Josh finds his girlfriend with another man (Jordan Weller), making out next to their car. Scenes of the band are also shown throughout the video performing the song in the same field with explosion effects.

== Awards and nominations ==
Awards and nominations for "Fallout"
Year	Organization	Award	Result	Ref(s)
2012	MuchMusic Video Awards	UR Fave Video of the Year	Nominated	
2012	MuchMusic Video Awards	Video of the Year	Nominated	
2012	MuchMusic Video Awards	Post-Production of the Year	Nominated	
2012	MuchMusic Video Awards	Cinematography of the Year	Won	
2012	MuchMusic Video Awards	Most Watched Video of the Year	Nominated	
2013	Independent Music Awards	Single of the Year	Nominated	
2013	Independent Music Awards	Video of the Year	Won	
2014	SOCAN Awards	Pop/Rock Music Award	Won	

== Charts ==
=== Weekly charts ===
Weekly chart performance for "Fallout"
Chart (2011–12)	Peak position
Canada (Canadian Hot 100)	26
Canada AC (Billboard)	37
Canada CHR/Top 40 (Billboard)	19
Canada Hot AC (Billboard)	11

=== Year-end chart ===
Year-end chart performance for "Fallout"
Chart (2012)	Position
Canadian Hot 100	53

== Certifications ==
Certifications and sales for "Fallout"
Region	Certification	Certified units/sales
Canada (Music Canada)	3× Platinum	240,000^{‡}
^{‡} Sales+streaming figures based on certification alone.

== Release history ==
Release dates and formats for "Fallout"
Region	Date	Format	Label	Ref.
Various	November 14, 2011	Digital download	604 Records	
United States	March 29, 2012	Contemporary hit radio	604 Records	
