= Alternative Addiction =

American music website

Alternative Addiction logo

Alternative Addiction was an American daily Internet publication devoted to music criticism and commentary, music news, and artist interviews. Its focus was on Alternative rock. It was in operation from 1999 to 2020.

== History ==
The website was originally created in 1999 by editor-in-chief Chad Durkee.

The site concentrated on new music, but its journalists also reviewed reissued albums and box sets. It had also begun garnering a following for its extensive coverage of underground music. In 2013, Alternative Addiction released unsigned band compilations, started its first online store, a digital downloads section, and had a message board and mailing list with over ten thousand subscribers.

Alternative Addiction worked with Columbia Records, 604 Records, Rock Ridge Music, Lava Records, and Geffen Records among others. It featured the latest news, interviews, record reviews, as well competitions.

The site has published "best-of" lists as annual features detailing the best albums and tracks of each year since 2002. The site also published a rock chart which was based on readers' votes. Charts were announced on Tuesday and featured twenty tracks and ten albums.

On December 15, 2020, Alternative Addiction ceased publication. The website URL was taken over by a rehabilitation directory called "Alternative to Addiction".
