= Faber Drive discography =

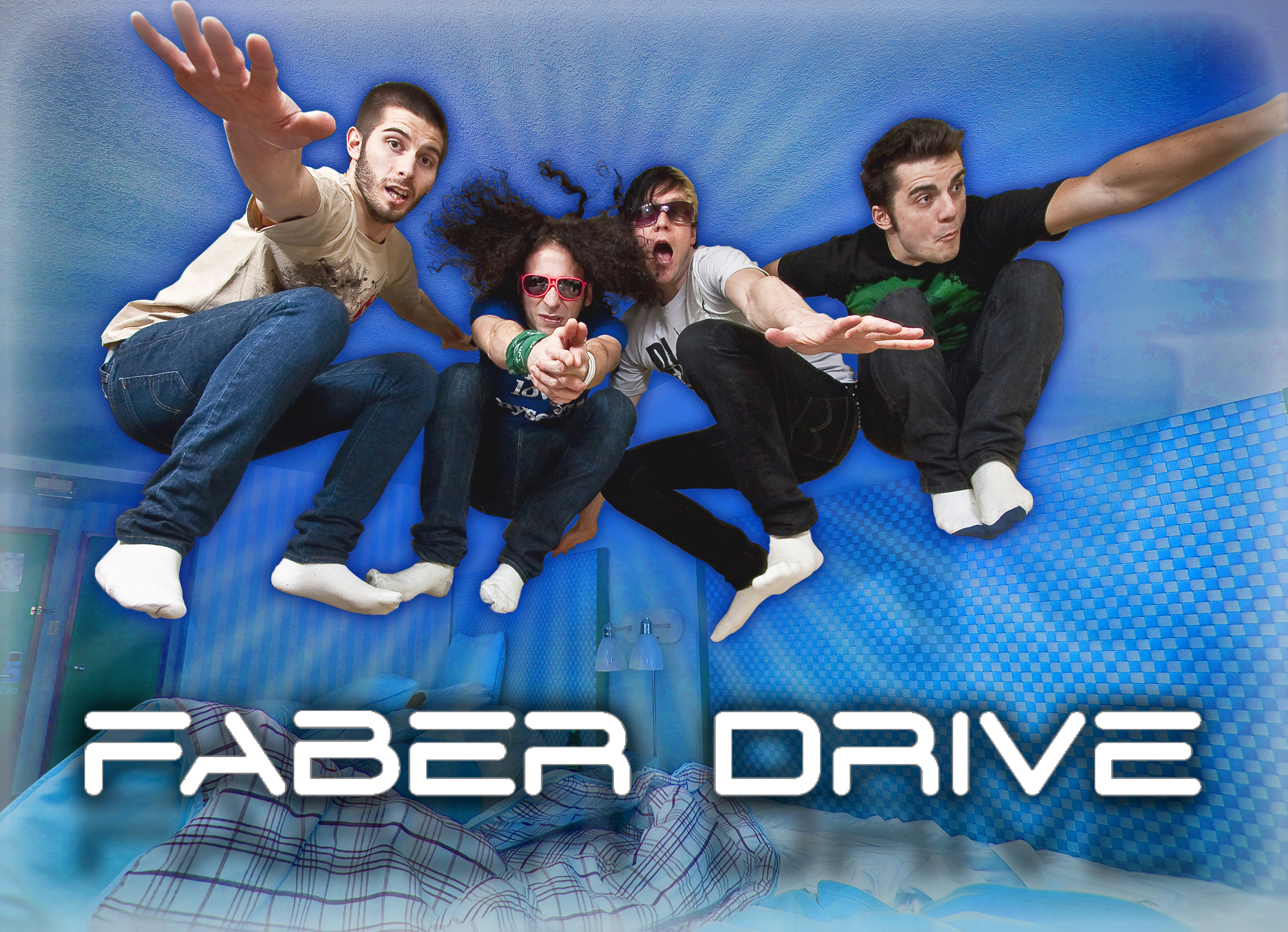
- Studio albums: 3
- Extended plays: 2
- Singles: 26
- Music videos: 12

The discography of Canadian pop rock band Faber Drive consists of three studio albums, two extended play, and twenty-six singles, twelve of which have an accompanying music video. Originally known as Faber, the group added the word Drive due to potential legal issues. They signed a record deal with 604 Records in 2006 after releasing one self-titled extended play independently and all of their studio recordings have been released under that record label in partnership with Universal Republic Records.

Their first two albums collectively produced five top 40 singles on the Canadian Hot 100, including one top 10 (2009's "G-Get Up and Dance"). "Tongue Tied" and "When I'm with You" have both been certified Gold by Music Canada, while "Dance" and "Give Him Up" have both been certified Platinum. Despite this success with singles, none of their albums have impacted the Billboard album charts, outside of Seven Second Surgery, reaching number 42 on the Canadian Albums Chart. However, both Seven Second Surgery and Can't Keep a Secret are certified Gold in Canada.

== Studio albums ==
List of studio albums, with selected chart positions and certifications
Title	Album details	Peak chart positions	Certifications
Title	Album details	CAN	Certifications
Seven Second Surgery	Released: May 1, 2007; Label: 604 Records; Format: CD, digital download	42	MC: Gold
Can't Keep a Secret	Released: November 10, 2009; Label: 604 Records; Format: CD, digital download	—	MC: Gold
Lost in Paradise	Released: August 28, 2012; Label: 604 Records; Format: CD, digital download	—	
"—" denotes a recording that did not chart.

== Extended plays ==
List of extended plays with release details
Title	EP details
Faber	Released: 2006 (Note: Faber was originally released independently sometime in 2006 but was formally re-issued on June 3, 2016.); Label: Independent; Format: CD
Lifeline	Released: April 25, 2025; Label: Tongue Tied Music Group; Format: Digital download, streaming

== Singles ==
List of singles, with selected chart positions and certifications, showing year released and album name
Title	Year	Peak chart positions				Certifications	Album
Title	Year	CAN	CAN AC	CAN CHR	CAN HAC	Certifications	Album
"Second Chance"	2007	26	—	11	13		Seven Second Surgery
"Tongue Tied"	2007	17	—	10	8	MC: Platinum	Seven Second Surgery
"When I'm with You"	2008	19	22	24	3	MC: Gold	Seven Second Surgery
"Sleepless Nights (Never Let Her Go)" (featuring Brian Melo)	2008	—	—	—	—		Seven Second Surgery
"G-Get Up and Dance"	2009	6	—	9	6	MC: Platinum	Can't Keep a Secret
"Give Him Up"	2009	26	—	14	13	MC: Platinum	Can't Keep a Secret
"You and I Tonight"	2010	49	38	42	9	MC: Gold	Can't Keep a Secret
"The Payoff"	2010	—	—	—	—		Can't Keep a Secret
"Do It in Hollywood"	2012	—	—	—	—		Lost in Paradise
"Candy Store" (feat. Ish)	2012	76	35	—	21	MC: Gold	Lost in Paradise
"Life Is Waiting"	2013	86	23	45	17		Lost in Paradise
"Too Little Too Late" (feat. Pierre Bouvier)	2013	—	—	—	—		Lost in Paradise
"Surrender"	2018	—	—	—	—		Non-album singles
"To Be With You" (feat. Powfu)	2019	—	—	—	—		Non-album singles
"What Are We Waiting For" (feat. Wolfgang Pander & Tamara Umlah)	2019	—	—	—	—		Non-album singles
"Mr Good for Nothin'"	2019	—	—	—	—		Non-album singles
"Chocolate Milk" (feat. Powfu)	2019	—	—	—	—		Non-album singles
"I Can See the Light" (feat. Powfu)	2019	—	—	—	—		Non-album singles
"You Lift Me Up" (feat. sleep.ing)	2019	—	—	—	—		Non-album singles
"Me, Myself and I" (feat. Maddi K)	2020	—	—	—	—		Non-album singles
"Payday"	2020	—	—	—	—		Lifeline
"Superman" (feat. Ashtøn Chase)	2021	—	—	—	—		Non-album singles
"The Story So Far"	2021	—	—	—	—		Non-album singles
"Never Gone"	2023	—	—	—	—		Non-album singles
"Life Out Here"	2024	—	—	—	—		Non-album singles
"Lifeline"	2025	—	—	—	—		Lifeline
"—" denotes a recording that did not chart.

=== As featured artists ===
List of singles as featured artists, with selected chart positions, showing year released and album name
Title	Year	Peak chart positions	Album
Title	Year	CAN AC	Album
"Love Can't Save Us Now" (Suzie McNeil featuring Faber Drive)	2012	25	Dear Love
"Hartwin Cole" (Belly ft. Faber Drive)	2012	—	Sleepless Nights 1.5
"Out of Time" (Fighting for Ithaca ft. Faber Drive)	2012	—	To The Rescue!!
"Rebel" (iSH ft. Faber Drive)	2014	—	Up & Up
"—" denotes a recording that did not chart.

=== Promotional singles ===
Title	Year	Album
"It Ends"	2008	Non-album single
"Sing in Celebration"	2010	A 604 Records Christmas (2010) / 604 Records: The Second Noel (2011)
"We 3 Kings"	2016	Non-album single
"Have You Ever Seen the Rain" (feat. The Faceplants)	2019	Lifeline
"Time After Time" (feat. sleep.ing)	2020	Non-album singles
"Afterglow" (feat. sleep.ing)	2021	Non-album singles
"Death Bed (Coffee For Your Head)"	2021	Lifeline
"With or Without You" (feat. sleep.ing)	2021	Non-album singles
"Boys of Summer"	2021	Non-album singles
"Oceans"	2022	Non-album singles
"The Middle" (feat. sleep.ing)	2022	Non-album singles

== Music videos ==
Year	Song	Director
2007	"Second Chance"	Frank Borin
2007	"Tongue Tied"	Colin Minihan
2008	"When I'm with You"	Colin Minihan
2008	"Sleepless Nights (Never Let Her Go)"	
2009	"G-Get Up and Dance"	Colin Minihan, Tony Mirza
2009	"Give Him Up"	Colin Minihan
2010	"You and I Tonight"	Colin Minihan, Danny Nowak
2010	"The Payoff"	Colin Minihan
2012	"Do It in Hollywood"	Colin Minihan
2012	"Candy Store"	Ben Knechtel
2013	"Life Is Waiting"	RT!
2025	"Sing in Celebration"	Matt Miller
