= Diego Gomes =

Canadian singer-songwriter (born 1996)

- Born: Diego Gomes; August 27, 1996 (age 30); Toronto, Ontario, Canada
- Genres: Pop; latin pop; rap
- Occupations: Musician; singer-songwriter; producer; director
- Instruments: Vocals; guitar
- Years active: 2010–present
- Labels: Universal Music Canada; Prizefight Productions; Studizzy

Diego Gomes (born August 27, 1996) is a Canadian singer-songwriter, musician, producer and director from Toronto, Ontario. He is best known as the season three winner of the Canadian YTV television series, The Next Star. He is also the CEO of videography business, New Wave Visuals.

== Early life ==
Gomes was born and raised in Toronto, Ontario. He is of Portuguese and Italian descent. At the age of ten, Gomes formed a band before auditioning for The Next Star. He cites music influences from G-Eazy, Mötley Crüe, Diplo, Michael Jackson, Metro Boomin and Future, among many more.

== Career ==
At the age of 13, Gomes auditioned for the third season of the Canadian reality competition television series, The Next Star in 2010. Out of 4,000 young Canadians, Gomes was chosen as one of the top six contestants along with Victoria Duffield, Isabelle Stern, Madi Amyotte, Brandon Bizior and Mimoza Duot. Gomes worked with songwriter and producer Ryan Stewart to record the song, "My Best Friend's Girl", a track he performed on the show. A music video was filmed for the song and was released on September 17, 2010. At the finale, Gomes was announced the winner of that season. "My Best Friend's Girl" amassed over 550,000 views on YouTube and reached the top ten on the Billboard Canada's Emerging Artist Chart. The song also debuted at number 85 on the Canadian Hot 100. In December 2010, the top six were called back to Toronto once again to perform a cover of Mariah Carey's "All I Want for Christmas Is You".

In January 2011, Gomes did a Long & McQuade in-store performance with Suzie McNeil, presented by CHUM-FM. Following his appearance on the show, he was signed to Universal Music Canada and released two songs under the label. He released the single, "Call My Name", in August 2011. He also released a promotional single titled, "Tonight We're on Fire", which was featured on The Next Star: Season 4 compilation album. In 2012, Gomes formed the pop-punk band, More Than Us, and toured across Ontario as well as performing shows at the Rogers Centre for the 2012 Spring Fling and the FazeSuperGirl Power-Up Event. In May 2013, Gomes released the single, "Prom Night", which was produced by Mike Klose and Wayne Young of The Wanderers. In August 2013, he released the single, "Just Let Go" from his upcoming EP, which was expected to be released in early 2014. In July 2015, he released a single titled, "Bow Tie", via Prizefighter Productions.

In 2017, Gomes signed with Studizzy Entertainment and released his first single under the label titled, "Understand Me". In an interview with Canadian Dope, Gomes stated that after signing with the label, he was able to make music he wanted to make. He later released the single, "Sirens".

In 2019, Gomes began focusing on videography full-time, shooting over 300 music videos. In October 2021, Gomes started a YouTube series on his channel, Dreams 2 Reality, documenting his financial success over the years. He also became the CEO of videography business, New Wave Visuals, where he has worked with artists such as DJ Unimerce and Chromazz. In 2023, Gomes stopped doing music to live a more private life, while continuing to direct music videos for several artists.

== Musical style ==
Early in his career, Gomes' music primarily focused on pop, which he expressed not having the freedom in what he wanted to do. He later transitioned to urban rap, before changing his sound to latin pop.

== Personal life ==
Gomes worked at a major beverage factory, before quitting to focus on videography and filming full-time.

== Discography ==
=== Extended Plays ===
List of EPs with selected details
Title	Details
Summer 18	Released: September 3, 2018; Label: Diego Gomes Music; Formats: Streaming; Track listing: 1. "Live My Life"; 2. "We Can Do This All Tonight"; 3. "#Celebrate"; 4. "Play"; 5. "Come Dance With Me"

=== As lead artist ===
List of singles as lead artist, with selected chart positions, showing year released and album name
Title	Year	Peak chart positions	Album
Title	Year	CAN	Album
"My Best Friend's Girl"	2010	85	YTV Presents The Next Star, Season 3
"All I Want for Christmas Is You" (with Victoria Duffield, Isabelle Stern, Madi Amyotte, Mimoza Duot and Brandon Bizior)	2010	—	Non-album singles
"Call My Name"	2011	—	Non-album singles
"Prom Night"	2013	—	Non-album singles
"Just Let Go"	2013	—	Non-album singles
"Bow Tie"	2015	—	Non-album singles
"Impossible"	2016	—	Non-album singles
"#Celebrate" (featuring C. Flowz)	2016	—	Summer 18
"Understand Me"	2017	—	Non-album singles
"Sirens"	2017	—	Non-album singles
"Rocket" (Diego Gomes x Eldorado)	2017	—	Non-album singles
"Focus"	2017	—	Non-album singles
"Te Quiero"	2017	—	Non-album singles
"Summer in the Winter"	2018	—	Non-album singles
"Now You're Sorry" (featuring Adriiana and Riff Raff)	2018	—	Non-album singles
"Wicked Games"	2019	—	Non-album singles
"Halloween Haunt"	2019	—	Non-album singles
"Nasty"	2020	—	Non-album singles
"—" denotes releases that did not chart.

=== As featured artist ===
List of singles as featured artist
Title	Year	Album
"I Can Feel It" (Julian Azeredo x Diego Gomes)	2013	Non-album singles
"In a Moment" (ThtKurtizKid featuring Diego Gomes)	2017	Non-album singles
"It Goes Down in the Six " (King Caddy featuring Diego Gomes)	2018	Non-album singles
"By the Lake" (Lil Kage featuring Diego Gomes)	2018	11:34
"Vibe" (King Caddy featuring Diego Gomes)	2019	Non-album single
"Money" (King Caddy featuring Diego Gomes)	2019	Non-album single

=== Promotional singles ===
List of promotional singles
Title	Year	Album
"Tonight We're on Fire"	2011	The Next Star Season 4
"The Past Year"	2013	Non-album singles
"Good Day" (featuring Isaiah Williams and S.B)	2017	Non-album singles
"Dancer" (Diego Gomes x Shakill)	2017	Non-album singles
"Let's Do This" (featuring Paolo)	2017	Non-album singles
"Fire on the Dancefloor"	2017	Non-album singles
"Bankroll" (Trey Jordan x Diego Gomes)	2017	Non-album singles
"Jane and Mac"	2018	Non-album singles

=== Music videos ===
Title	Year	Director(s)	Ref.
"My Best Friend's Girl"	2010	Unknown	
"All I Want for Christmas Is You"	2010	Unknown	
"Just Let Go"	2013	Unknown	
"Let It Snow!"	2013	Unknown	
"Understand Me"	2017	TunnelVisionTO	
"Good Day"	2017	M Works	
"Dancer"	2017	M Works	
"Let's Do This"	2017	Unknown	

=== Other appearances ===
Title	Year	Artist(s)	Album	Notes	Ref.
"Wonderful"	2016	Travis Scott	—N/a	Remixing	
"I Made It"	2016	KN Glory Boy	Non-album singles	Producer	
"Coachella"	2017	New City	Non-album singles	Remixing	
