= Shut Up and Dance (Victoria Duffield album) =

Studio album by Victoria Duffield
- Released: August 21, 2012
- Recorded: 2011–2012
- Genre: Dance-pop; electropop; teen pop
- Length: 27:57
- Label: Warner Music Canada
- Producer: Ryan Stewart

Victoria Duffield chronology
Shut Up and Dance (2012)	Accelerate (2014)

Singles from Shut Up and Dance
- 1. "Shut Up and Dance" Released: July 12, 2011; 2. "Feel" Released: February 13, 2012; 3. "Break My Heart" Released: June 26, 2012; 4. "They Don't Know About Us" Released: August 1, 2012

Shut Up and Dance is the debut studio album by Canadian singer Victoria Duffield, released by Warner Music Canada on August 21, 2012. The title track was released as the lead single from the album in July 2011 and peaked at number 12 on the Canadian Hot 100 chart, and was certified platinum in Canada in February 2012. Three additional singles were released from Shut Up and Dance after the album's release: "Feel", "Break My Heart" — which peaked at number 35 on the Canadian Hot 100 and was later certified gold — and "They Don't Know About Us", a collaboration with Cody Simpson.

== Track listing ==
No.	Title	Writer(s)	Length
1.	"Shut Up and Dance"	Ryan Stewart, Victoria Duffield	4:00
2.	"Break My Heart"	Ryan Stewart, Victoria Duffield	3:53
3.	"They Don't Know About Us" (featuring Cody Simpson)	Rachel Suter, Micayle "Mack" McKinney, "Lazyboi" Asad, Troy B. Samson, Victoria Duffield	3:13
4.	"Save Me"	Ryan Stewart, Victoria Duffield	3:46
5.	"Sweet Fantasy"	Cam Hunter, Marty Martino, Michael Anthony, Rachel Suter, Victoria Duffield	3:44
6.	"Feel"	Jodi Marr, Rob Wells, Victoria Duffield	3:04
7.	"Baby Come Home"	Ryan Stewart, Victoria Duffield	2:47
8.	"Final Warning"	Ryan Stewart, Victoria Duffield	3:23

Japanese edition bonus tracks
No.	Title	Length
9.	"Last Christmas"
10.	"Break My Heart" (French version featuring Djen Silencieux)
11.	"Shut Up and Dance" (French version featuring Lukay)
12.	"Shut Up and Dance" (Beat Chemist Remix)
13.	"Shut Up and Dance" (JP Remix)
14.	"Feel" (Original Sin Remix)
15.	"Feel" (Beat Chemist Remix)

== Charts ==
Chart (2012)	Peak position
Canada (Billboard Canadian Albums Chart)	12
