= Daniel Richter =

Daniel Richter may refer to:

- Daniel Richter (actor) (born 1939), American mime, actor and choreographer
- Daniel Richter (artist) (born 1962), German artist
- Daniel Richter (singer), Canadian singer, member of band Eleven Past One
- Daniel K. Richter, American historian
