= You and I Tonight =

Single by Faber Drive

from the album Can't Keep a Secret
- Released: March 25, 2010
- Genre: Alternative rock; emo pop
- Length: 3:42
- Label: 604; Universal Music Canada
- Songwriters: Dave Faber; Jeff Johnson; Jeremy Liddle
- Producer: Johnson

Faber Drive singles chronology
"Give Him Up" (2009)	"You and I Tonight" (2010)	"The Payoff" (2010)

"You and I Tonight" is a song by Canadian rock band Faber Drive. It was released as the third single from their second studio album, Can't Keep a Secret. It was officially released to Canadian radio on March 25, 2010, and is reminiscent of their earlier hits such as "Tongue Tied" and "When I'm with You".

The song peaked at number 49 on the Canadian Hot 100. It also reached the top ten on the Canada Hot AC airplay chart, peaking at number nine. A music video released in May 2010, reached number five on the MuchMusic Countdown.

== Composition ==
"You and I Tonight" was written by Dave Faber and Jeremy Liddle, while production was handled by Jeff Johnson, who also co-wrote the song. Musically, the song is described as a rock ballad.

== Music video ==
The music video for "You and I Tonight" released in May 2010, and was directed by Colin Minihan and Danny Nowak. It was filmed in Vancouver and features a classic "break up, make up" story. The video starts off with a boyfriend and girlfriend who appear to have had a fight. The girl walks away and toward the camera with tears streaming down her face. In between are shots of Faber Drive performing on a street filled with cars in the pouring rain. The boyfriend yells at the girl, who rips off a locket she has on and throws it on the floor. She leaves the room and the boyfriend gets up and throws a vase at a wall. Just as the vase hits the wall and shatters into pieces, time appears to have stopped and everything, except the boyfriend and later the girlfriend, is frozen in time, including a cat appearing to jump down from a shelf. Puzzled, he looks around the room and grabs a rose from the broken vase. Meanwhile, the girlfriend is outside and tries to hail a taxi, but it drives away. A van drives by through a puddle of water which is about to splash the girl, but as she ducks, time stops and she avoids being soaked.

After shots of Faber Drive, the boyfriend is seen leaving the house and stops at two frozen people engaging in conversation. With time still frozen, the camera then pans to the front of a car and zooms out to a scene of people in cars and umbrellas. The boyfriend is seen searching for his girlfriend. Additional shots of people frozen in time include a man pouring trash from a garbage can into another. The girlfriend is now seen also looking for her boyfriend, peering into stopped cars. She then gets inside a taxi as her boyfriend is shown on the street looking for her. He looks into the same taxi she went in, but she is not there. He sees her standing alone in the rain. In the final scenes, the boyfriend approaches her and comforts her. He pulls out the rose and gives it to her. They kiss and the silhouette of their heads make out the crude shape of a heart.

The video reached number five on the MuchMusic Countdown for the week ending August 26, 2010.

== Personnel ==
Credits for "You and I Tonight" retrieved from album's liner notes.

Faber Drive

- Dave Faber – lead vocals, guitar
- Jordan Pritchett – lead guitar, backing vocals
- Jeremy Liddle – bass, backing vocals
- Andrew Stricko – drums, backing vocals

Production

- Jeff Johnson – producer
- Joey Moi – engineer, mixing, vocal recording
- Ted Jensen – mastering
- Chris Holmes – editing
- Scott Cooke – editing
- Rob Stefanson – drum technician

== Charts ==
Chart performance for "You and I Tonight"
Chart (2010)	Peak position
Canada (Canadian Hot 100)	49
Canada AC (Billboard)	38
Canada CHR/Top 40 (Billboard)	42
Canada Hot AC (Billboard)	9

== Certifications ==
Certifications for "You and I Tonight"
Region	Certification	Certified units/sales
Canada (Music Canada)	Gold	40,000^{‡}
^{‡} Sales+streaming figures based on certification alone.

== Release history ==
Release dates and formats for "You and I Tonight"
Region	Date	Format	Label	Ref.
Canada	April 27, 2010	Digital download	604	
