= Lost in Paradise =

Lost in Paradise may refer to:

== Music ==
- Lost in Paradise (X-Perience album), 2006
- Lost in Paradise (Faber Drive album), 2012
- Lost In Paradise, a 2017 album by Common Kings
- Lost in Paradise, a 2002 album by Armik
- "Lost in Paradise" (Evanescence song), 2011
- "Lost in Paradise", a 2012 song by Rihanna from Unapologetic
- "Lost in Paradise" (ALI song) ", 2020, featuring rapper AKLO

== Other uses ==
- Lost in Paradise (film), a 2011 Vietnamese film
- Lost in Paradise, a 2015 novel by Mikael Torfason
