= G-Get Up and Dance =

"G-Get Up and Dance!"

Single by Faber Drive

from the album Can't Keep a Secret
- Released: July 21, 2009
- Genre: Pop punk; synthpop
- Length: 3:09
- Label: 604; Universal Records
- Songwriters: Faber Drive; Calvin Lechner; Pierre Bouvier
- Producers: Colin Friesen; Dave Ogilvie

Faber Drive singles chronology
"Sleepless Nights (Never Let Her Go)" (2008)	"G-Get Up and Dance!" (2009)	"Give Him Up" (2009)

Music video
- "G-Get Up and Dance" on YouTube

"G-Get Up and Dance!" is a song by Canadian pop punk band Faber Drive. It was released on July 21, 2009, as the lead single from their second studio album, Can't Keep a Secret. It debuted and peaked at number 6 on the Canadian Hot 100. The song was certified Platinum by Music Canada in October 2009.

== Composition ==
Written by members of Faber Drive, Brian Howes, Pierre Bouvier and co-written by Dave Faber's wife, Ricarda, Faber said the song was inspired after performing at a club in Ottawa, where their label representative played their song "Second Chance", however received little reaction from people on the dance floor, which led to Faber stating, "we gotta write a song that keeps people on the dance floor." Originally slated for release under a different project name, their label wanted them to release the single as a Faber Drive song.

== Release ==
Dave Faber revealed the title for the song on June 7, 2009, describing it as "more modern" than their previous singles. The song was officially released on July 21, for digital download. It was serviced to contemporary hit radio on July 31. An Alkatraz remix of the song was released on November 24.

== Critical reception ==
Matthew Chisling of AllMusic described the track as "a brilliant, over-processed piece of party rock."

== Awards and nominations ==
Awards and nominations for "G-Get Up and Dance"
Year	Organization	Award	Result	Ref(s)
2010	MuchMusic Video Awards	Pop Video of the Year	Nominated	
2010	Independent Music Awards	Astral Media Radio Favourite Single	Nominated	

== Music video ==
The music video was released on August 19, 2009, via their official YouTube page.

== Track listing ==
Digital download
No.	Title	Length
1.	"G-Get Up and Dance"	3:09

Digital download – remix
No.	Title	Length
1.	"G-Get Up and Dance" (Alkatraz remix)	3:36

Digital download – extended remix
No.	Title	Length
1.	"G-Get Up and Dance" (Alkatraz extended remix)	5:31

== Personnel ==
Credits for "G-Get Up and Dance" retrieved from album's liner notes.

Faber Drive

- Dave Faber – lead vocals, guitar
- Jordan Pritchett – lead guitar, backing vocals
- Jeremy Liddle – bass, backing vocals
- Andrew Stricko – drums, backing vocals

Production

- Colin Friesen – producer, digital editing
- Dave Ogilvie – producer, mixing
- Tom Coyne – mastering

== Charts ==
=== Weekly charts ===
Weekly chart performance for "G-Get Up and Dance"
Chart (2009)	Peak position
Canada (Canadian Hot 100)	6
Canada CHR/Top 40 (Billboard)	9
Canada Hot AC (Billboard)	6

=== Year-end charts ===
Year-end chart performance for "G-Get Up and Dance"
Chart (2009)	Position
Canada (Canadian Hot 100)	48

== Certifications ==
Certifications for "G-Get Up and Dance"
Region	Certification	Certified units/sales
Canada (Music Canada)	Platinum	40,000^{*}
^{*} Sales figures based on certification alone.
