= Eleven Past One =

- Origin: Bowmanville, Ontario, Canada
- Genres: Pop rock
- Years active: 2007–2019
- Labels: Warner Music Canada, Reliant Music U.S.A, EMI
- Members: Daniel Richter; Stephen Richter; Justin Hartshorn; Steve Patenaude
- Past members: Dan Beattie; Kyle Bykiv

Eleven Past One, also known as 1:11, is a Canadian pop music band, most notable for their single "The World Is Ours".

== History ==
The band formed in 2007 in Bowmanville, Ontario. The members are two brothers, lead singer Daniel Richter and guitarist Stephen Richter, as well as their friends Kyle Bykiv on guitar, and Steve Patenaude on drums.

In early 2009, the band hooked a trailer to their SUV and drove around the south of the United States living in trailer parks with no electricity or running water for six months. Singer Daniel Richter, his brother and guitarist Stephen Richter and drummer Steve Patenaude played in Cocoa Beach for sunbathers.

The trio eventually met an investor and a producer, which led to a three-month recording session in Los Angeles and a debut LP, The Ultimate Catch. The album caught the attention of manager Eric Clinger who further introduced the group to Hedley and Simple Plan producer Brian Howes. This led to a collaboration that yielded the band's breakthrough single, "The World Is Ours".

Eleven Past One took the song directly to Virgin Radio in Toronto. "The World Is Ours" soon became a top 15 radio hit in Canada, its Cuba-shot video gained 750,000 hits on YouTube and the group signed a deal with Warner Music Canada. "The World Is Ours" was certified gold in Canada on July 25, 2013. It spent 11 weeks on Billboard's Canadian Hot 100, peaking at number 32 and 20 weeks on the Canadian singles chart, peaking at number 23.

The band released the EP The World Is Ours in November 2014. The eight-track record features collaborations with Ryan Williams (Pink, Kelly Clarkson), Ryan Stewart (Carly Rae Jepsen, Victoria Duffield) as well as Andy Stochansky and Goo Goo Dolls front man John Rzeznik, who produced the pensive piano ballad "There's Nothing Wrong."

Eleven Past One has performed with Cody Simpson, Hedley, Down with Webster and many more. Their biggest show to date was alongside R5 and Zendaya at the Molson Canadian Amphitheatre; the show was sold out and televised on the Family Channel.

TV performances include MuchMusic's New Music Live, The Marilyn Denis Show, YTV's The Next Star, Canada AM, The Morning Show, Breakfast Television, CP24, Family Channel and Juicebox.

The band committed to touring across North America and around the world in 2014 and 2015. On January 16, 2017, the band released a new single, "Forever Now" through a U.S record company called Reliant Music. Their next single, "Dynamite" was released on March 20, 2017.

Daniel Richter, the lead vocalist of the band is featured on the 2014 hit "Light Up" by the Canadian artist iSH (Ishan Morris).

In 2017, Eleven Past One released a lyric video version of their non-album single, "Closer".

However, since its release no one has heard anything else from the band.

== Members ==
- Daniel Richter – vocals
- Stephen Richter – guitar
- Justin Hartshorn - bass
- Steve Patenaude – drums

Former members

- Dan Beattie – bass
- Kyle Bykiv - guitar

== Discography ==
=== Studio albums ===
| Title | Album details | Peak chart positions | Certifications |
| Title | Album details | CAN | Certifications |
|---|---|---|---|
| The Ultimate Catch | Released: June 22, 2010; Label: Clinger; Formats: CD, digital download | — | |
| The World Is Ours | Released: November 7, 2014; Label: Warner Music Canada; Formats: CD, digital download | — | |

=== Singles ===
| Title | Year | Peak chart positions | Certifications | Album |
| Title | Year | CAN | Certifications | Album |
|---|---|---|---|---|
| "The World Is Ours" | 2012 | 32 | MC: Gold | The World is Ours |
| "Tonight's the Night" | 2013 | — | | The World is Ours |
| "I'm Ready" | 2014 | — | | The World is Ours |
| "There's Nothing Wrong" | 2015 | — | | The World is Ours |
| "Closer (Lyric Video Version)" | 2017 | | | Non-Album Single |

=== Music videos ===
| Title | Year | Director |
|---|---|---|
| "The World Is Ours" | 2012 | Ben Knechtel |
| "Tonight's the Night" | 2013 | Ben Knechtel |
| "I'm Ready" | 2014 | Ben Knechtel |
| "There's Nothing Wrong" | 2015 | Ben Knechtel |

== Daniel Richter discography ==
=== As featured artist ===
| Title | Year | Album |
|---|---|---|
| "Light Up" (iSH featuring Daniel Richter) | 2009 | Non-album single |
