= The Next Star =

Canadian reality TV series

- The current logo
- Presented by: Adamo Ruggiero (2008–2012); Carlos Bustamante (2013–2014)
- Judges: Steve Cranwell (2008–2011); Suzie McNeil (2008–2011); Christopher Ward (2008–2011); Keshia Chanté (2012–2013); Tara Oram (2012–2014); Mark Spicoluk (2012–2014); Dan Kanter (2014)
- Opening theme: "Let's Go" by Suzie McNeil
- Country of origin: Canada
- No. of episodes: 96 (including Supergroups)

Production
- Running time: Varies
- Production company: Tricon Film & Television

Original release
- Network: YTV
- Release: July 18, 2008 – September 21, 2014

The Next Star is a Canadian reality competition television series that was broadcast on YTV. It was hosted by Adamo Ruggiero (seasons 1–5) and Carlos Bustamante (season 6–7). The series involved a competition to find the most talented singer in Canada who is aged 15 years or younger, with the winner crowned "the next star". Winning contestants were Dunnery Bond (season 1), Tianda Flegal (season 2), Diego Gomes (season 3), Melissa "Charlie" Storwick (season 4), Brooklyn Roebuck (season 5), Alicia Moffet (season 6) and Jory Zechner (season 7).

In addition to host Adamo Ruggiero (2008–2012), the judges for the first 4 seasons (2008–2011) included Suzie McNeil, Steve Cranwell, and Christopher Ward. The subsequent judges (2012–2014) were Keshia Chanté, Mark Spicoluk, and Tara Oram. Season 5 aired on YTV from July 16 to September 23, 2012. The stylists and coaches (2008–2014) were Jasmine Denham-Baird (vocal coach), Michael Riccio (dance and choreography), Peter Papapetrou (clothes and wardrobe), and Dee Daly (hair and makeup stylist).

As of season 6, Carlos Bustamante (host of YTV's The Zone) replaced the show's former host, Adamo Ruggiero, and web host Mark "Suki" Suknanan was added to the cast.

On September 22, 2013, YTV announced that The Next Star was getting a spin-off show, entitled The Next Star – Supergroups. The first episode premiered March 11, 2014. The season one finale premiered April 13, 2014.

On March 5, 2014, the show's Facebook page confirmed that The Next Star would have a seventh and final season. and premiered on July 14 to September 21, 2014. Season 7 has Dan Kanter replacing Keshia Chanté as a judge.

== Season 1 (2008) ==
=== Top 6 ===
These were the top 100 contestants of season one. It was soon announced that 11-year-old Charlotte Kosc had been diagnosed with viral meningitis and pneumonia in her right lung and therefore couldn't continue in the competition (she had been chosen to proceed as one of the top six). Amanda Rowland was selected as a replacement.

- Alyssa Reid, then age 15
- Briar Gillis, then age 14
- Christina LeClair, then age 13, 14 at the finale
- Dunnery Bond, then age 14
- Maranda Thomas, then age 11
- Amanda Rowland, then age 14

#	Contestants	Eliminations		Hometown
#	Contestants	01	02	Hometown
1	Dunnery Bond	1st	WON	Halifax, Nova Scotia
2	Briar Gillis	2nd	FINALIST	Vineland, Ontario
3	Charlotte Kosc	N/A	Dropped Out	Winnipeg, Manitoba
4	Maranda Thomas	3rd	FINALIST	Mississauga, Ontario
5	Christina LeClair	4th	FINALIST	Brantford, Ontario
6	Alyssa Reid	5th	FINALIST	Brampton, Ontario
7	Amanda Rowland	6th	Sub for Charlotte	Montreal, Quebec
8	Andrea Macasaet	7th		Winnipeg, Manitoba
9	Chloe Lloyd	8th		Maple Ridge, British Columbia
10	Moses Duot	9th		Winnipeg, Manitoba
11	Kieran Jacobs	10th		Kahnawake, Quebec
12	Savannah Boyko	11th		Winnipeg, Manitoba
13	Teemu Alexander	12th		Winnipeg, Manitoba

=== Singles ===
Each of the six finalists also got to record a single, available on iTunes or on the show's season one compilation EP.

#	Song	Artist	Length
1.	"Gonna Make You Dance"	Alyssa Reid	3:26
2.	"Stuck in My World"	Maranda Thomas	3:11
3.	"Shy"	Dunnery Bond	3:02
4.	"From the Heart"	Amanda Rowland	3:19
5.	"The Last Word"	Briar Gillis	3:15
6.	"Everyday Crazy"	Christina LeClair	3:36

=== Episodes ===
The first three episodes consisted of auditions and narrowing the top 12 down to 6 finalists.

Episode	Theme	Info
1	Searching the West
2	Searching the East
3	12 to 6
4	Pop Star Evaluation	The Top Six are after Episode 3.
5	Own a Song
6	The Next You	The Top Six find and create their own unique looks.
7	Meet the Press	The Top Six are interviewed on The Zone
8	Giving Back	The Top Six give back to local charities.
9	The Duet	The Top Six partner up to perform a duet: Alyssa & Amanda, Briar & Christina, and Dunnery & Maranda.
10	The Buzz	The Top Six will travel across Toronto to attend to some superstar duties and meet Nikki Yanofsky.
11	The Single	The Top Six unveil the finished result of their singles.
12	The Look Back	A recap of the entire season.
13	Live Finale	Dunnery Bond is crowned the winner at Canada's Wonderland on September 28, 2008.

== Season 2 (2009) ==
The second season of "The Next Star!" premiered on July 17, 2009. Suzie McNeil, Steve Cranwell and Christopher Ward all returned as judges, and Adamo Ruggiero returned as host.

=== Format ===
This season's format is very similar to the previous one, with the judges and host traveling to 6 different locations throughout Canada to find their top contestants. But, unlike Season 1, the judges chose 16 contestants to move on to the semi-finals, as opposed to Season 1's Top 12. The winner received a grand prize package valued at over $6 million Canadian dollars including studio time at Metalworks Studios, to write and record two additional songs (not including the one performed on the show). These songs were produced by Universal Canada, and released in spring 2010. They will also have their own showcase at the premier annual Canadian Music Week Showcase, where they will debut their songs; as well as receiving a J-45 Standard Acoustic Guitar and an Epiphone Valve Jr. Combo Amp courtesy of Gibson Guitars. The season's compilation EP was released in October 2009.

The September 27 finale, from International Showplace at Canada's Wonderland, featured performances by FeFe Dobson and Justin Bieber, who had recently earned his first hit with "One Time", but not yet released an album.

=== Top 6 ===
The Top 6 was revealed to Canada on August 7, 2009.

- Wren Burnett, then age 13
- Tianda Flegal, then age 13
- Lizz Kellermann, then age 14
- Darrelyne Bickel, then age 15
- Rayandra Hudson, then age 13 at the audition, then 14 throughout the show and final
- Brock Zanrosso, then age 14

#	Contestants	Eliminations		Hometown
#	Contestants	1	2	Hometown
1	Tianda Flegal	1st	WON	Fraser Lake, British Columbia
2	Brock Zanrosso	2nd	FINALIST	Richmond, British Columbia
3	Lizz Kellermann	3rd	FINALIST	Mississauga, Ontario
4	Rayandra Hudson	4th	FINALIST	Mississauga, Ontario
5	Darrelyne Bickel	5th	FINALIST	The Pas, Manitoba
6	Wren Burnett	6th	FINALIST	Halifax, Nova Scotia
7	David Marino	16th/7th		Montreal, Quebec
8	Jordan Bergeron	16th/7th		Boisbriand, Quebec
9	Jonathan Lewis	16th/7th		Oakville, Ontario
10	Adriana Lombardo	16th/7th		Brampton, Ontario
11	Cheyenne Duff	16th/7th		Stratford, Ontario
12	Brady Chyzyk	16th/7th		Virden, Manitoba
13	Carlyn Graff	16th/7th		Winnipeg, Manitoba
14	Lauren Adamoski	16th/7th		Edmonton, Alberta
15	Kimberly Truong	16th/7th		Prince Rupert, British Columbia
16	Sabrina Duda	16th/7th		Surrey, British Columbia

=== Singles ===
Each of the six finalists also got to record a single, which are available on iTunes or on the show's season two compilation EP.

#	Song	Artist	Producer
1.	"Without You Here"	Tianda Flegal	Tri Define Records
2.	"One More First Chance"	Brock Zanrosso	Shawn Desman
3.	"If I Fall"	Wren Burnett	Davor Vulama
4.	"Solitude of Sunday"	Darrelyne Bickel	Dave Thompson
5.	"More Perfect than a Doll"	Lizz Kellermann	Simon Wilcox
6.	"What We Need is Love"	Rayandra Hudson	Chin Injeti

== Season 3 (2010) ==
The Next Star returns with a third season, which was the most popular season yet, with Host Adamo Ruggiero and Judges Suzie McNeil, Steve Cranwell, and Christopher Ward. This contained the first Christmas themed episode, with the song "All I Want For Christmas Is You" by Mariah Carey.

=== The Top 6 ===
#	Contestants	Eliminations	
#	Contestants	1	2
1	Diego Gomes	TOP 6	WON
2	Victoria Duffield	TOP 6	FINALIST
3	Isabelle Stern	TOP 6	FINALIST
4	Brandon Bizior	TOP 6	FINALIST
5	Madi Amyotte	TOP 6	FINALIST
6	Mimoza Duot	TOP 6	FINALIST
7	Annie	OUT	
8	Kelsey	OUT	
9	Sophie	OUT	
10	Alesandria	OUT	
11	Brook	OUT	
12	Evan	OUT	
13	Anton	OUT	
14	Sabrina	OUT	
15	Zaki	OUT	
16	Annaliese	OUT	
17	Blake	OUT	

=== Singles ===
No.	Song	Artist
1.	"My Bestfriend's Girl"	Diego Gomes
2.	"I've Got A Crush On You"	Isabelle Stern
3.	"Front Row"	Madi Amyotte
4.	"Insane (Thru With U)"	Mimoza Duot
5.	"Better Off Anyway"	Brandon Bizior
6.	"Fever"	Victoria Duffield

The top six were called back to Toronto once again around December to perform a top 6 group music video of the Christmas song "All I Want For Christmas is You".

== Season 4 (2011) ==
The fourth season of The Next Star premiered on July 18, 2011. All three judges and host Adamo returned for the season. The season got a new logo – a big star with the show title on it. This season also had a new intro and the theme was slightly modified for the opening title sequence. For the first time since the first season, Calgary, Alberta was one of the 6 audition cities.

The Top 6 were revealed to Canada August 2011.

- Melissa "Charlie" Storwick, then age 12
- Shania Fillmore, then age 15
- Milly Benzu, then age 15
- April Llave, then age 13
- JD Meeboer, then age 15, (deceased May 27, 2021)
- Parker Schmidt, then age 12

#	Contestants	Eliminations		Hometown
#	Contestants	1	2	Hometown
1	Charlie Storwick	TOP 6	WINNER	Calgary, Alberta
2	Shania Fillmore	TOP 6	FINALIST	Saint-Philippe, New Brunswick
3	Milly Benzu	TOP 6	FINALIST	Longueuil, Quebec
4	JD Meeboer	TOP 6	FINALIST	Vineland, Ontario
5	April Llave	TOP 6	FINALIST	Winnipeg, Manitoba
6	Parker Schmidt	TOP 6	FINALIST	Duncan, British Columbia
7	Aiden Shufman	OUT		Thornhill, Ontario
8	Lexie Tytlandsvik	OUT		Radville, Saskatchewan
9	Dane Bjornson	OUT		Winnipeg, Manitoba
10	Sydney Delong	OUT		Oakville, Ontario
11	Kristian Paschalis	OUT		Peterborough, Ontario
12	Dylan Mueller	OUT		Fairview, Alberta
13	Bradley Martinez	OUT		Castleton, Ontario
14	Yangxi Wu	OUT		Scarborough, Ontario
15	Andrew Machum	OUT		Halifax, Nova Scotia
16	Angela Apigo	OUT		Scarborough, Ontario

=== Singles ===
#	Person	Song	Hometown
1.	Charlie Storwick	"Good As Gone"	Calgary, Alberta
2.	Shania Fillmore	"Dreams"	Scarborough, Ontario
3.	JD Meeboer	"Sparks Are Gonna Fly"	Vineland, Ontario
4.	Parker Schmidt	"It Might Be You"	Scarborough, Ontario
5.	April Llave	"Spotlight"	Winnipeg, Manitoba
6.	Milly Benzu	"If You Were Mine"	Longueuil, Quebec
7.	Top 6	"Turn It Up Up Up"	Various

== Season 5 (2012) ==
Adamo Ruggiero returned as the host for season 5, with Keshia Chanté, Mark Spicoluk, and Tara Oram as new judges. The season premiered on July 16, 2012. This season the show also hit over 6500 followers on Twitter and 60,000 likes on their Facebook. A new part is "The Wild Card", four people who received a "No" at the auditions are reconsidered and one will get The Wild Card, a chance to continue on. The live finale at Canada's Wonderland was held on September 23, 2012. The 'winners song' for the season was "One Thing" by One Direction. Brooklyn performed the "winners song". In late-September 2012, it was announced that there is going to be another episode of this season titled "48 Hours in the Spotlight". Also, on November 12, 2012, it was announced that there will be a Christmas episode, song and music video with the whole top 6, premiering on December 11, 2012 after Life with Boys: Naughty or Nice with Boys. "48 Hours in the Spotlight" will contain Brooklyn's second single/music video. The 'Winner's Episode' premiered on December 18, 2012. This was the second Christmas episode since Season 3. Pop singer Aleesia performed as a musical guest for the show.

- Brooklyn Roebuck, then age 14
- Darren Espanto, age 10 at auditions, then 11 during the show and final
- Ryan Hawken, age 14 at auditions, then 15 during the show and final
- Amer Dhaliwal, then age 15
- Grace Johnston, then age 15
- Issy Dahl, age 14 at auditions, then 15 during the show and final

=== Choosing the Wild Card ===
The judges picked 4 contestants who at first received a "No" at the auditions. Issy then received the Wild Card.

#	Contestants	Eliminations		Hometown
#	Contestants	01	02	Hometown
1	Issy Dahl	Nominated	WON AS WILD CARD	Winnipeg, Manitoba
2	Jonah Berens	Nominated	OUT	Winnipeg, Manitoba
3	Rebecca Lappa	Nominated	OUT	Edmonton, Alberta
4	Maria	Nominated	OUT	Maple Ridge, British Columbia

=== Top 6 ===
#	Contestants	Eliminations		Hometown
#	Contestants	01	02	Hometown
1	Brooklyn Roebuck	TOP 6	WON	Chatham, Ontario
2	Darren Espanto	TOP 6	Finalist	Calgary, Alberta
3	Ryan Hawken	TOP 6	Finalist	Toronto, Ontario
4	Amer Dhaliwal	TOP 6	Finalist	Brampton, Ontario
5	Grace Johnston	TOP 6	Finalist	Winnipeg, Manitoba
6	Issy Dahl	TOP 6	Finalist	Winnipeg, Manitoba
7	Madi	OUT		Whitehorse, Yukon
8	Brianna	OUT		Musgrave Harbour, Newfoundland and Labrador
9	Daniel	OUT		Winnipeg, Manitoba
10	Vince	OUT		Oshawa, Ontario
11	Kafaye Rose	OUT		Toronto, Ontario
12	Kaija rose	OUT		Ottawa, Ontario
13	Becky	OUT		Dollard-des-Ormeaux, Quebec

=== Episodes ===
Episode #	Title	Summary	Air date
1	"Auditions, Part 1"	The judges Tara Oram, Keshia Chanté and Mark Spicoluk set off to find the top 13 with the host Adamo Ruggiero.	July 16, 2012
2	"Auditions, Part 2"	The judges Tara Oram, Keshia Chanté and Mark Spicoluk set off to find the top 13 with the host Adamo Ruggiero.	July 23, 2012
3	"Auditions, Part 3"	The judges Tara Oram, Keshia Chanté and Mark Spicoluk set off to find the top 13 with the host Adamo Ruggiero.	July 30, 2012
4	"Top 6"	The judges have found the top 13 and are now watching them perform to find the top 6. Brooklyn, Amer, Ryan, Darren, Grace and Issy are the top 6.	August 6, 2012
5	"The Next Song"	The top 6 choose their own song, style, dance moves and wardrobe.	August 13, 2012
6	"Panel of Experts"	Now the panel of experts choose the top 6's wardrobe, style, dance moves and song.	August 20, 2012
7	"So Much!"	The panel of experts once again choose the top 6's wardrobe, style, dance moves and song. Plus, they film a commercial for the finale.	August 27, 2012
8	"Music Videos, Part 1"	Grace, Brooklyn and Darren get together with their own producer to create their own single and music video.	September 3, 2012
9	"Music Video, Part 2"	Amer, Issy and Ryan get together with their own producer to create their own single and music video.	September 10, 2012
10	"It's NOW"	The top 6 create a group single called "NOW" and they film a music video for the song.	September 17, 2012
11	"The Next Star Finale"	The judges, the host and the top 6 join together for the live finale with singing guest's Shawn Desman, Neverest and Cher Lloyd.	September 23, 2012
12	"Not on the Naughty List"	The gang are back in Toronto and Adamo makes sure that the judges and the top 6 aren't on the Naughty List. They also create one last group song for Christmas.	December 11, 2012
13	"48 Hours in the Spotlight"	This episode follows Brooklyn as she just starts to get the fact that she WON THE NEXT STAR! It will premiere one of her new singles and music video.	December 18, 2012

=== Singles ===
#	Person	Song	Producer
1.	Grace	"Caught Up"	Nicole Hughes
2.	Brooklyn	"The Way I See You" ft. Nate Hall (finale only)	Wayne Petti
3.	Darren	"Gotta Give A Little Extra"	Rezza Brothers
4.	Amer	"See You Again"	Jeff Dazel
5.	Issy	"More"	Rob Wells
6.	Ryan	"In My Mind"	Zubin Thakkar
7.	Top 6	"Now"	Jasmine Denham
8.	Top 6	"Oh Oh Santa"	Jasmine Denham

== Season 6 (2013) ==
Through their Facebook page, The Next Star has confirmed its return for a sixth season. The announcement was made on March 5, 2013. Adamo Ruggiero did not return as host and Carlos Bustamante instead took over, as confirmed in a video released on March 20, 2013. "The Wild Card" is back. It premiered on July 15, 2013 on YTV. This is the first season to have a finale pre-show.

=== Top 6 ===
#	Contestants	Eliminations		03	Hometown
#	Contestants	01	02	03	Hometown
1	Alicia Moffet	TOP 9	TOP 6	WON	Montreal, Quebec
2	Alex Zaichkowski	TOP 9	TOP 6	Finalist	St. Albert, Alberta
3	Paige Prescott	TOP 9	TOP 6	Finalist	Winnipeg
4	Kat Moscone	TOP 9	TOP 6	Finalist	Toronto, Ontario
5	Jaden MacPhee	TOP 9	TOP 6	Finalist	Windsor, Ontario
6	Dante Scott	TOP 9	TOP 6	Finalist	Amherstburg, Ontario
7	Angelina	TOP 9	OUT		Whitehorse, Yukon
8	Yasmeen	TOP 9	OUT		St. Albert, Alberta
9	Cameron Molloy	TOP 9	OUT		Allison, New Brunswick
10	Mason Vail	OUT			St. Catharines, Ontario
11	Olenka Bak	OUT			London, Ontario
12	Ella	OUT			New Hamburg, Ontario
Wildcard	Gary Gordon	OUT			Barrie, Ontario

- Alicia Moffet, then age 14, Winner
- Jaden MacPhee, then age 14 (Finalist)
- Paige Prescott, then age 15 (Finalist)
- Alex Zaichkowski, then age 15 (Finalist)
- Dante Scott, then age 12 (Finalist)
- Kat Moscone, then age 13 (Finalist)

=== Episodes ===
Episode #	Title	Summary	Air date
1	"Auditions, Part 1"	The judges Tara Oram, Keshia Chanté and Mark Spicoluk set off to find the top 13 with the host Carlos Bustamante.	July 15, 2013
2	"Auditions, Part 2"	The judges Tara Oram, Keshia Chanté and Mark Spicoluk set off to find the top 13 with the host Carlos Bustamante.	July 22, 2013
3	"Auditions, Part 3"	The judges Tara Oram, Keshia Chanté and Mark Spicoluk set off to find the top 13 with the host Carlos Bustamante.	July 29, 2013
4	"The Little Twist"	The top 13 perform to find out who will make the top 9, this seasons twist.	August 5, 2013
5	"This Seasons Top 6"	The top 9 perform to see who will make this season's top 6. Paige, Alex, Kat, Dante, Alicia and Jaden make the top 6.	August 12, 2013
6	"It's Up To You"	The top 6 choose their own style, dance moves and song to perform in front of a live audience.	August 19, 2013
7	"Flip It"	It's now up to the experts to choose their new style & look, dance moves and song in front of live audience.	August 26, 2013
8	"We're A Team"	A top 6 member must help another top 6 member in there perform in front of a live audience.	September 2, 2013
9	"We Just Don't Care!"	The top 6 pair up with another member to perform a song in front of a live audience. Also, they film there group music video titled "We Just Don't Care"	September 9, 2013
10	"#musicvideos"	Alex, Paige, Dante, Alicia, Jaden and Kat film there individual music videos.	September 16, 2013
11	"The Next Star Finale: Live!"	The top 6, the judges and the host, Carlos Bustamante, all join together at Canada's Wonderland in Vaughan, Ontario, on September 22, 2013. They find out who will be crowned the show's season 6 'Next Star'. This season's special guest performers include Cody Simpson and Eleven Past One. They also include Brooklyn Roebuck, Darren Espanto, and the Top 6.	September 22, 2013

=== Singles ===
#	Person	Song	Director
1.	Top 6	"We Just Don't Care"	Peter Papapetrou
2.	Kat	"Lioness"	AaronA
3.	Alex	"All I Want"	Adam Goldhammer
4.	Alicia	"Better Watch Out For Me"	Ben Knetchel
5.	Jaden	"Winners"	Dan LeMoyne
6.	Dante	"Goodbye Gravity"	Grandson and Son
7.	Paige	"Say U 2"	Stash Caper

== The Next Star – Supergroup ==
During commercial break on the season six live finale (September 22, 2013) it was announced there will be The Next Star spin-off titled The Next Star – Supergroup. It was soon after confirmed on the official The Next Star Twitter though nothing was said about it. The Next Star – SuperGroup appears to be similar to The Next Star but The Next Star – SuperGroup is not about solo singers, it is about groups of singers performing. There will be new judges and coaches. Not much is known about it. There will be contestants from other seasons on the show including: Michelle Cavaleri, Parker Schmidt, Shania Fillmore, Isabelle Stern, Amer Dhaliwal, Mimoza Duot, Gary Gordon, Dane Bjornson, Olenka Bak, Bradley Martinez, and Ryan Hawken. The very first episode premiered March 11, 2014. The season one finale premiered April 13, 2014. In the premiere, there was live screening party at Toronto to watch the first episode, attended by the fans of The Next Star, the hosts of the show, and other known members including Carlos Bustamante and Ryan Dizon.

== Season 7 (2014) ==
The Next Star continues for a seventh season and premiered on July 14, 2014. Season 7 has Dan Kanter replacing Keshia Chanté as a judge.

#	Contestants	Eliminations		Hometown
#	Contestants	01	02	Hometown
1	Jory Zechner	TOP 6	WON	Nipigon, Ontario
2	Kaleia Simons-Cook	TOP 6	Finalist	Edmonton, Alberta
3	Michaelah Weekes	TOP 6	Finalist	Kelowna, British Columbia
4	Nissita Francis	TOP 6	Finalist	Barrie, Ontario
5	Ryland Clark	TOP 6	Finalist	Deseronto, Ontario
6	Shon Burnett	TOP 6	Finalist	Surrey, British Columbia
7	Anna	OUT		Regina, Saskatchewan
8	Grace Bakker	OUT		Toronto, Ontario
9	Jake Donaldson	OUT		Newcastle, Ontario
10	McKenzie	OUT		Chilliwack, British Columbia
11	Nayana	OUT		Ottawa, Ontario
12	Richard	OUT		South Surrey, British Columbia

- Jory Zechner (Winner), then age 15
- Kaleia Simons-Cook (Finalist), age 12 at auditions, then 13 during the show and final
- Michaelah Weekes (Finalist), then age 15
- Nissita Francis (Finalist), age 12 at auditions, then 13 during the show and final
- Ryland Clark (Finalist), age 14 at auditions, then 15 during the show and final
- Shon Burnett (Finalist), then age 12

=== Singles ===
#	Song	Artist
1.	"Up To Us"	Jory Zechner
2.	"Breaking Glass"	Kaleia Simons-Cook
3.	"What R U Doin 2 Me"	Michaelah Weekes
4.	"Do It"	Nissita Francis
5.	"So Hepburn"	Ryland Clark
6.	"Be Your Holiday"	Shon Burnett
