= Can't Keep a Secret =

Studio album by Faber Drive
- Released: November 10, 2009
- Recorded: 2009
- Studio: Discomunky Studios (Mission); Renegade Recording (Vancouver); 604 Studios (Vancouver); Greenhouse (Vancouver); Mountainview Studios (Abbotsford); Armoury (Vancouver); Hipposonic (Vancouver); The Umbrella Factory (Vancouver); Van Howes Studios (Vancouver)
- Genre: Dance rock; electropop; pop rock
- Length: 41:34
- Label: 604; Universal Music Canada
- Producer: Dave Genn; Josh Ramsay; Brian Howes; Dave 'Rave' Ogilvie; Colin 'Crocker' Friesen; Jeff Johnson; Dave Faber; Jeremy 'Krikit' Liddle

Faber Drive chronology
| Seven Second Surgery (2007) | Can't Keep a Secret (2009) | Lost in Paradise (2012) |

Singles from Can't Keep a Secret
- 1. "G-Get Up and Dance" Released: July 21, 2009; 2. "Give Him Up" Released: December 15, 2009; 3. "You and I Tonight" Released: March 25, 2010; 4. "The Payoff" Released: October 14, 2010

Can't Keep a Secret (stylized can'T keEp A SecrEt) is the second studio album by Canadian pop punk band Faber Drive, released on November 10, 2009. The first single released from this album was "G-Get Up and Dance". It reached number six on the Canadian Hot 100 chart. Its second single, "Give Him Up", was released on November 30, 2009, and peaked at number 26 on the Canadian Hot 100. Its third single, "You and I Tonight", peaked at number 49. A fourth single, "The Payoff", failed to chart.

== Background and recording ==
After releasing their debut album Seven Second Surgery in 2007, the band shifted their sound from pop punk to electropop, a decision that was "not intentional," according to singer Dave Faber. During this time, original drummer Ray Bull and original guitarist David Hinsley left the band to pursue different life interests, leaving Faber and bassist Jeremy Liddle as the sole members. The two started wrote the song "G-Get Up and Dance" while looking for new members. It was originally going to be released under a different project as it featured a dance music sound, however, their label and management "loved" the song and wanted it on a Faber Drive album.

The band also had more control with the songwriting and producing on the album. On their first album, they worked with producer Brian Howes, who helped co-write a lot of the songs on the album, along with Chad Kroeger. On Can't Keep a Secret, the band wanted to be more involved with the songwriting process as Faber stated, "we were just really focused on making the songs as good as we could. Songwriting is the most important thing for us, so to make the songs stand the test of time is the biggest thing."

Musically, the album is a blend of electropop and pop rock, highlighting different stylistic points. Inspired by Def Leppard, they wanted the record "to be the best that it can be and that means always evolving." The group also worked Josh Ramsay of Marianas Trench, who co-wrote "Give Him Up". The album's eleventh and last track "By Your Side", was written about Faber's father, who died from lung cancer. Faber said of the song, "it's powerful how much of an impact one person can have on somebody's life and that's what the song is about."

== Release and promotion ==
In late 2008, the band started releasing material from the album, releasing a demo for "By Your Side". On July 21, 2009, they released "G-Get Up and Dance" as the album's lead single. The album's second single, "Give Him Up" was released on December 15, 2009. Its third single "You and I Tonight" was released for radio airplay on March 25, 2010, before it was released for digital download on April 27. The album's fourth single, "The Payoff", was released on October 14, along with its music video.

In support of the album, the band toured with Hedley, Stereos and Fefe Dobson, before embarking on their headlining Can't Keep a Secret tour, with support from The Latency, These Kids Wear Crowns, Jesse Labelle, and The New Cities.

== Critical reception ==
Professional ratings
Review scores
| Source | Rating |
|---|---|
| AllMusic | 3.5/5 stars |
| Melodic | 3/5 stars |

AllMusic writer Matthew Chisling praised the new dance-rock approach the band took on the record but was skeptical of their ability to find their own sound and just use the most popular genres instead. He concluded that a track like the Jessie Farrell duet "I'll Be There" "suggest that just because Faber Drive are playing to the sounds of the times doesn't mean they can't produce terrific music that is always funky and fun, if not spectacularly unique." Johan Wippsson from Melodic also gave note of the use of synthesizers throughout the album, but felt that it sounds like two separate bands occupying the same record, with only half of the tracks utilizing said instrument. He concluded that "there's some nice songs here like on the debut and if you're into lightweight modern rock Can't Keep a Secret is worth checking up."

The album's first two singles, "G-Get Up and Dance" and "Give Him Up" were certified Platinum by Music Canada and reached the top 30 on the Canadian Hot 100, while the third single "You and I Tonight", peaked at number 49. At the 2011 Juno Awards, Can't Keep a Secret was nominated for Pop Album of the Year, ultimately losing to Justin Bieber's My World 2.0.

== Track listing ==
| No. | Title | Lyrics | Music | Length |
|---|---|---|---|---|
| 1. | "The Payoff" | Faber; Krikit | Faber; Colin 'Crocker' Friesen | 3:03 |
| 2. | "G-Get Up and Dance!" | Faber; Krikit; Ricarda Faber; Calvin Lechner | Faber; Friesen; Krikit; R. Faber; Lechner; Pierre Bouvier | 3:09 |
| 3. | "You and I Tonight" | Jeff Johnson; Faber; Krikit | Johnson | 3:42 |
| 4. | "I'll Be There" | Faber; Johnson; Krikit | Johnson; Faber | 3:28 |
| 5. | "Give Him Up" | Faber; Krikit; Josh Ramsay | Ramsay | 3:38 |
| 6. | "Our Last Goodbye" | Faber; Krikit; Lechner; Dave Genn | Faber; Krikit; Genn | 3:10 |
| 7. | "Lucky Ones" | Brian Howes | Howes | 3:13 |
| 8. | "Forever" | Faber; Lechner; Krikit; Ramsay; David Hinsley | Faber; Ramsay; Krikit | 3:35 |
| 9. | "Never Coming Down" | Faber; Krikit; Genn | Genn | 3:43 |
| 10. | "Just What I Needed" | Ric Ocasek | Ocasek | 3:27 |
| 11. | "By Your Side" | Faber; Krikit; Genn | Faber; Krikit; Genn | 4:00 |

Bonus track
| No. | Title | Length |
|---|---|---|
| 12. | "I'll Be There" (featuring Jessie Farrell) | 3:28 |

== Personnel ==
Credits adapted from the album's booklet.

Faber Drive

- Dave Faber – lead vocals, guitar
- Jeremy 'Krikit' Liddle – bass, backing vocals
- Jordan 'JP' Pritchett – lead guitar, backing vocals
- Andrew Stricko – drums, backing vocals

Additional musicians

- Colin 'Crocker' Friesen
- Brian Howes
- Jeff Johnson
- Shane Hayes
- Daniel Adair
- Josh Ramsay
- Nik Pesut
- Dave 'Rave' Ogilvie
- Dave Genn
- Darren Parris
- Doug Gorkoff
- Ian Browne
- Paul Laine
- Jay Van Poederooyen
- Jay Benison

Technical

- Colin 'Crocker' Friesen – producer (1, 2, 10), digital editing (1, 2, 10)
- Dave Genn – producer (6, 9, 11)
- Jeff Johnson – producer (3, 4)
- Josh Ramsay – producer (5, 8), digital editing (5, 8)
- Brian Howes – producer (7)
- Dave 'Rave' Ogilvie – producer (2), mixing (2, 4, 5, 9, 10)
- Mark Needham – mixing (1, 8)
- Mike Fraser – mixing (6, 11)
- Joey Moi – mixing (3)
- Jay Van Poederooyen – mixing, digital editing (7)
- Dean Maher – engineering, digital editing (6, 9, 11)
- Chris 'Hollywood' Holmes – engineering (3, 4)
- Ted Jensen – mastering (1, 3–11)
- Tom Coyne – mastering (2)

Imagery

- Matt Barnes – photography
- Jacqueline Sonegra – logo design
- re:form – design

== Certifications ==
Certifications and sales for Can't Keep a Secret
| Region | Certification | Certified units/sales |
|---|---|---|
| Canada (Music Canada) | Gold | 40,000^{‡} |
^{‡} Sales+streaming figures based on certification alone.

== Release history ==
Release history and formats for Can't Keep a Secret
| Region | Date | Format | Label | Ref. |
|---|---|---|---|---|
| Canada | November 10, 2009 | CD; digital download | 604; Universal Music Canada | |
| Various | November 10, 2009 | Digital download | 604 | |
