= Brandon Bizior =

Canadian singer-songwriter (born 1995/96)

- Born: Brandon Bizior; 1995 or 1996 (age 30–31); Hamilton, Ontario, Canada
- Genres: Pop rock; pop; R&B
- Occupations: Musician; singer-songwriter
- Instruments: Vocals; guitar
- Years active: 2010–2019
- Label: Castlehill Entertainment

Brandon Bizior (born 1995/1996) is a Canadian singer-songwriter and musician from Hamilton, Ontario. He is best known for being one of the six finalist on the Canadian YTV television series, The Next Star, on the third season.

Bizior has also released radio singles such as "Why'd You Have to Be You" and "In the Dark". He has released two EPs, Addicted (2016) and In the Dark (2017).

== Early life ==
Bizior was born and raised in Hamilton, Ontario. He began singing and started playing guitar at the age of six. He wrote songs of his own and performed in front of hundreds of people at the age of eight. He was hired to perform at the Hard Rock Cafe in Niagara Falls, as well as nursing and retirement homes. Bizior also took vocal lessons from Ray Lyell. He performed at various bars and clubs, while writing and producing his first album. He attended Bishop Ryan Catholic Secondary School and is a graduate of the school. He has also attended Mohawk College in 2019 and has graduated from the school in 2021.

== Career ==
Bizior auditioned for the third season of the Canadian reality competition television series, The Next Star in the summer of 2010. He recalled in a 2016 interview that when he watched the second season of The Next Star at the age of 14, it would be a good opportunity for his music career. Out of 4,000 young Canadians, Bizior was chosen as one of the top 6 contestants along with Diego Gomes, Victoria Duffield, Isabelle Stern, Madi Amyotte and Mimoza Duot. Bizior worked with Ron Lopata of jacksoul to record the song, "Better Off Anyway", a track he performed on the show. A music video was also filmed for the song. At the finale, he lost the competition to Gomes. The top six were called back to Toronto once again around December to perform a cover of Mariah Carey's "All I Want for Christmas Is You". In January 2011, Bizior held a CD release party for his debut release.

Following his appearance on the show, he released a new single titled, "Why'd U Have to Be U" on January 2, 2014. The song is labelled as Bizior's "breakout single" and reached number 34 on the Canada AC chart and number 42 on the Canada Hot AC chart. It was the most played soft rock song in the country. Bizior earned a Maestro award for "Outstanding Solos" in 2014. In June 2015, he performed at the Streetsville Founders' Bread and Honey Festival.

He released the single, "In the Dark" on March 26, 2016. The song peaked at number 46 on the Canada CHR/Top 40 chart. His first EP titled, Addicted, was released onto SoundCloud on October 25, 2016. In February 2017, Bizior performed at the Neb's Fun World event, where it was hosted by the Carion Fenn Foundation, a fundraiser for rare disease research. He released the second single from his second EP, "Addicted", on April 29, 2017. In the Dark, his second EP, was released on May 12, 2017. Bizior took part in the Higher Reign Music Showcase during Canadian Music Week in April 2017. In January 2019, Bizior was featured in a song titled, "Dying Earth" released by artist Don Carlo. He has not released any new music since.

Bizior has worked with other artists such as Ray Lyell and Stevie Salas. He has cited inspiration from bands and artists such as Radiohead, Bruce Springsteen, Daft Punk, Steve Angello and Bon Jovi. Bizior signed with Castle Hill Entertainment in 2014 and was in talks with American music labels.

== Personal life ==
It appears that Bizior has retired from music as he previously worked for Scotiabank as a Customer Service Representative from November 2019 to August 2020 and is currently working as a Financial Services Representative for the CIBC according to his LinkedIn profile page.

== Discography ==
Brandon Bizior discography
- EPs: 2
- Singles: 6
- Music videos: 2

=== Extended Plays ===
List of EPs with selected details
| Title | Details |
|---|---|
| Addicted | Released: October 25, 2016; Label: Castlehill Entertainment; Formats: Digital download; Track listing: 1. "Rebels of Our Time"; 2. "The Thrill"; 3. "Fuel to Fire"; 4. "Deeper Side"; 5. "In the Dark"; 6. "So Cold"; 7. "Addicted" |
| In the Dark | Released: May 12, 2017; Label: Castlehill Entertainment; Formats: Digital download; Track listing: 1. "In the Dark"; 2. "Addicted"; 3. "Rebels of Our Time"; 4. "So Cold" |

=== Singles ===
List of singles, with selected chart positions
| Single | Year | Peak chart positions | | | Album |
| Single | Year | CAN AC | CAN HAC | CAN CHR | Album |
|---|---|---|---|---|---|
| "Better Off Anyway" | 2010 | — | — | — | YTV Presents The Next Star, Season 3 |
| "All I Want for Christmas Is You" (with Diego Gomes, Victoria Duffield, Isabelle Stern, Madi Amyotte and Mimoza Duot) | 2010 | — | — | — | Non-album singles |
| "Why'd U Have to Be U" | 2014 | 34 | 42 | — | Non-album singles |
| "In the Dark" | 2016 | — | — | 46 | In the Dark |
| "Addicted" | 2017 | — | — | — | In the Dark |
| "Dying Earth" (with Don Carlo) | 2019 | — | — | — | Non-album single |
"—" denotes releases that did not chart

=== Music videos ===
| Title | Year | Album | Ref. |
|---|---|---|---|
| "Better Off Anyway" | 2010 | YTV Presents The Next Star, Season 3 | |
| "All I Want for Christmas Is You" | 2010 | YTV Presents The Next Star, Season 3 | |

== Awards and nominations ==
| Year | Association | Category | Nominated work | Result | Ref. |
|---|---|---|---|---|---|
| 2014 | Maestro Awards | Outstanding Solos | Brandon Bizior | Won | |
