= Sleepless Nights (Never Let Her Go) =

Single by Faber Drive featuring Brian Melo

from the album Seven Second Surgery
- Released: July 29, 2008
- Studio: Mountainview Studios (Abbotsford, British Columbia)
- Genre: Alternative rock; pop punk; emo
- Length: 3:27
- Label: 604; Universal Records
- Songwriters: Faber Drive; Brian Howes
- Producers: Joey Moi; Howes

Faber Drive singles chronology
"When I'm with You" (2008)	"Sleepless Nights (Never Let Her Go)" (2008)	"G-Get Up and Dance" (2009)

Brian Melo singles chronology
"Shine" (2008)	"Sleepless Nights (Never Let Her Go)" (2008)	"Summertime" (2008)

"Sleepless Nights (Never Let Her Go)" is a song by Canadian pop punk Faber Drive. It was released as the fourth single on July 29, 2008, from their debut studio album Seven Second Surgery. The song is about a family in which the father is abusive to his wife. The music video reached number 26 on the MuchMusic Countdown.

== Composition ==
"Sleepless Nights (Never Let Her Go)" was written by Dave Faber, Jeremy Liddle, Ray Bull, David Hinsley and Brian Howes, while production handled by Howes and Joey Moi. A demo version of the song under the title "Again" was first released. Originally written as a "self-loathing confession to a loved one," however, feeling though the message was not "powerful enough," Faber re-wrote it to reflect about domestic abuse.

"It's from the child's point of view. It means a lot to us because it's a real issue. My parents used to fight a lot when I was growing up. They were never abusive, but it was hard, so I can imagine how painful it must be for kids from abusive families."

== Music video ==
The music video for "Sleepless Nights (Never Let Her Go)" was released in October 2008, directed by Colin Minihan. The video reached number 26 on Canada's MuchMusic Countdown on the week of October 9, 2008.

The music video shows a child, mother and father. The child wakes up in the middle of the night due to his parents fighting. The father gets mad over small things and usually directs his anger at his wife. Anytime the father yells, the child goes up to their room and watches in terror. He quickly manages to retreat back to his room before his father catches him. However, when he's finally caught, the father pins him to the wall and angrily tells him never to do it again. This finally results in his son and wife leaving him. The video features Canadian Idol winner Brian Melo.

Due to the realistic portrayal of domestic violence, the video ended with a black screen displaying two toll-free phone numbers (one of which is Kids Help Phone) for counseling regarding on personal issues. It was shot in Vancouver.

== Personnel ==
Credits for "Sleepless Nights (Never Let Her Go)" retrieved from album's liner notes.

Faber Drive

- Dave Faber – lead vocals, guitar
- David Hinsley – lead guitar, backing vocals
- Jeremy Liddle – bass, backing vocals
- Ray Bull – drums, backing vocals

Additional musicians

- Brian Melo – featured artist, vocals

Production

- Brian Howes – producer
- Joey Moi – producer, mixing, engineer, recording
- Chad Kroeger – additional producer
- Scott Cooke – assistant recording engineer
- Ted Jensen – mastering

== Release history ==
Release dates and formats for "Sleepless Nights (Never Let Her Go)"
Region	Date	Format	Label	Ref.
Various	July 29, 2008	Digital download	604	
