= Give Him Up =

Single by Faber Drive

from the album Can't Keep a Secret
- Released: December 15, 2009
- Genre: Pop punk; synthpop
- Length: 3:38
- Label: 604; Universal Records
- Songwriters: Dave Faber; Jeremy Liddle; Josh Ramsay
- Producer: Ramsay

Faber Drive singles chronology
"G-Get Up and Dance" (2009)	"Give Him Up" (2009)	"You and I Tonight" (2010)

"Give Him Up" a song by Canadian pop punk band Faber Drive. It was released on December 15, 2009, as the second single from their second studio album, Can't Keep a Secret. It peaked at number 26 on the Canadian Hot 100. The song was certified Platinum by Music Canada in April 2010.

== Background and release ==
The song debuted on contemporary hit radio on November 29, 2009, before it was officially released as a single on December 15, 2009, for digital download.

== Composition ==
"Give Him Up" was written by Dave Faber and Jeremy Liddle. The track was produced by Josh Ramsay, who also co-wrote the song. Described as a dance by Dave Faber, he stated that the band "We really wanted to write some dance stuff so we wrote 'Give Him Up' with Josh Ramsay [Marianas Trench], and we're proud of what we've got."

== Music video ==
A video was released by the band via their official YouTube channel on January 13, 2010. It features the band in a bowling alley, showcasing a story about a teenaged boy cheating on his girlfriend by going on a date with another girl. His girlfriend secretly stalks the couple and eventually busts them by the end of the video.

== Personnel ==
Credits for "Give Him Up" retrieved from album's liner notes.

Faber Drive

- Dave Faber – lead vocals, guitar
- Jordan Pritchett – lead guitar, backing vocals
- Jeremy Liddle – bass, backing vocals
- Andrew Stricko – drums, backing vocals

Production

- Josh Ramsay – producer
- Dave Ogilvie – mixing
- Tom Coyne – mastering

== Charts ==
=== Weekly charts ===
Weekly chart performance for "Give Him Up"
Chart (2009–10)	Peak position
Canada (Canadian Hot 100)	26
Canada CHR/Top 40 (Billboard)	14
Canada Hot AC (Billboard)	13

=== Year-end charts ===
Year-end chart performance for "Give Him Up"
Chart (2010)	Position
Canada (Canadian Hot 100)	84

== Certifications ==
Certifications for "Give Him Up"
Region	Certification	Certified units/sales
Canada (Music Canada)	Platinum	40,000^{*}
^{*} Sales figures based on certification alone.
