= Seven Second Surgery =

Studio album by Faber Drive
- Released: May 1, 2007
- Recorded: 2006
- Studio: Mountainview Studios (Abbotsford)
- Genres: Alternative rock; pop punk; power pop
- Length: 47:05
- Label: 604 Records
- Producers: Brian Howes; Chad Kroeger (add.)

Faber Drive chronology
| Faber (2006) | Seven Second Surgery (2007) | Can't Keep a Secret (2009) |

Singles from Seven Second Surgery
- 1. "Second Chance" Released: February 1, 2007; 2. "Tongue Tied" Released: August 2007; 3. "When I'm with You" Released: January 2008; 4. "Sleepless Nights (Never Let Her Go)" Released: July 29, 2008

Seven Second Surgery is the debut studio album by Canadian pop punk band Faber Drive. It was released on May 1, 2007, under 604 Records. The songs "24 Story Love Affair" and "Sex and Love" from the band's EP Faber were also added to the album. Seven Second Surgery garnered positive reviews from critics, who praised the production and the band's musicianship but questioned their longevity in an oversaturated market. The album spawned four singles: "Second Chance", "Tongue Tied", "When I'm with You", and "Sleepless Nights (Never Let Her Go)".

The album peaked at number 42 on the Canadian Albums Chart and was certified Gold by Music Canada in April 2018, denoting sales of 50,000 units. It is the only album to feature guitarist David Hinsley and drummer Raymond 'Red' Bull; both departed the group in 2008.

== Background and recording ==
In early 2006, the band released their debut Faber EP. The EP includes three tracks: "Sex and Love," "24 Story Love Affair," and "Cementhead". Later that year, they were signed by Chad Kroeger to his label 604 Records in May. Soon after, the group started working with Joey Moi for pre-production and Brian Howes for songwriting. Recording took place at Mountainview Studios in Abbotsford, British Columbia.

The title, Seven Second Surgery came from when the band was trying to think of a new band name, after their lawyer advised them for a change as there were other bands in the United Kingdom and United States, also called Faber. However, the group felt that Seven Second Surgery was better as an album title and their name was changed to Faber Drive. The band had two acoustic demos, "Again" and "It Ends", both were re-recorded under new song titles, "Sleepless Nights (Never Let Her Go)" and "Tongue Tied", respectively. The demos were eventually posted onto iTunes. Before entering the studio, they decided to re-write "It Ends" with Chad Kroeger and titled it "Tongue Tied". Dave Faber, who wrote most of the songs on the album, credited guitarist David Hinsley for writing "Sleepless Nights" and "Time Bomb", with Faber helping out with melodies and tweaking some of the lyrics.

== Release and promotion ==
The album's lead single "Second Chance" was released on February 1, 2007, in Canada. The song premiered via Melodic.net on March 20, before it was officially released elsewhere on March 27. After releasing the lead single, the band announced that their debut album Seven Second Surgery, would be released in the spring of 2007. "Tongue Tied" was released in August 2007, as the second single from the album. The third single "When I'm with You" was released in January 2008. Its fourth single "Sleepless Nights (Never Let Her Go)", featuring Brian Melo, was released on July 29, 2008.

In support of the album, the group embarked on a tour in March 2008, and were joined by Hello Operator. They also toured with Brian Melo and Marianas Trench. From August to September, the band supported Simple Plan on their Canadian tour, along with Metro Station and Cute Is What We Aim For.

On May 1, 2026, the band released the 19 ¼ anniversary edition of Seven Second Surgery, which includes acoustic versions of "Second Chance", "Tongue Tied" and "Time Bomb", as well as an unreleased bonus track, "Died In Your Arms", the latter, premiered on April 10.

== Critical reception ==
Professional ratings
Review scores
| Source | Rating |
|---|---|
| AbsolutePunk | (68%) |
| AllMusic | 4.5/5 stars |
| Alternative Addiction | 4/5 stars |
| PopMatters | 6/10 stars |
| TuneLab | 3/5 stars |

Seven Second Surgery received positive reviews from music critics praising the production and musicianship from both the producers and the band but were unsure of how the latter would last long-term. Jo-Ann Greene of AllMusic gave high praise to the album's well-crafted production and the band's musicianship for paying nods to their musical influences while delivering them with tenacious energy, concluding with, "Powerful playing, strong melodies, irrepressible choruses, and a stunning sound belie this album's title – with no quick fix to be found, this set was lovingly operated on over time and built to last." A writer from Alternative Addiction also gave praise to the production and lyrical work of Brian Howes mixing well with the band in a pop punk environment, despite some surface-only lyrics and stale genre material towards the end, calling the album "a sensational collection of bubble gum pop tunes that become instantly embedded in the brain, however band longevity means song longevity and with the next album the band should look to evolve into something a little less instant and with a clear plan to leave a longer lasting taste on the aural palate."

Jason MacNeil of PopMatters described the band's debut as "shimmering, slick and glossy power pop/punk," comparing them to Sum 41 and Simple Plan. Praising the "radio-friendly" opening track "24 Story Love Affair" that has "all the right hooks for a summer drive," "Killin' Me", "Time Bomb" and "Sleepless Nights (Never Let Her Go)", he wrote, "Fans of Yellowcard would probably enjoy this stuff minus the violin." However, he was critical on "When I'm With You", which he felt, took the album "down again to a mediocre level." Overall, he said, "Safe and tidy in this instance, Faber Drive will hopefully take more chances next time around."

A writer from TuneLab praised the album's collection of pop rock lyrics with various emotions being delivered by a capable and talented band but felt the material was more Kroeger and Howes with the band included and it was interchangeable with other similar albums, concluding that "Seven Second Surgery may not be groundbreaking, earth shattering, or for that matter original, but it is not a shitty album on the whole. In order to enjoy the album, one must bury the fact that this is stereotypical radio rock and just enjoy the album for what it is-fun, upbeat, catchy, and a quick fix." Chris Fallon of AbsolutePunk commended the band's effort to deliver upbeat and catchy pop punk material but found the lyrics generic and the catchability in the hooks and melodies lacking in staying power like the rest of the album, concluding that, "We all enjoy candy every now and then, and that is exactly what Faber Drive's Seven Second Surgery is: a roll of Shock Tarts that leaves your tastebuds on high-alert and keeps your mind buzzing, but eventually, drains you and leaves you feeling vacant."

The album's first three singles, "Second Chance", "Tongue Tied" and "When I'm with You" reached the top 30 on the Canadian Hot 100. "Tongue Tied" and "When I'm with You" were also certified Platinum and Gold by Music Canada, respectively. "Second Chance" won the group Best New Hot Adult Contemporary Group of the Year, as well as a nomination for New Solo Artist of the Year at the 2008 Canadian Radio Music Awards.

== Track listing ==
All tracks are written by Faber Drive and Brian Howes, except where noted.

Standard edition
| No. | Title | Length |
|---|---|---|
| 1. | "24 Story Love Affair" | 3:37 |
| 2. | "Tongue Tied" (Faber Drive, Brian Howes, Chad Kroeger) | 3:30 |
| 3. | "Second Chance" (Faber Drive, Howes, Kroeger) | 3:42 |
| 4. | "Sex and Love" | 3:00 |
| 5. | "Sleepless Nights (Never Let Her Go)" | 3:25 |
| 6. | "Killin' Me" | 3:25 |
| 7. | "When I'm with You" | 3:41 |
| 8. | "Summer Fades to Fall" | 3:21 |
| 9. | "Time Bomb" | 2:43 |
| 10. | "Obvious" | 2:58 |
| 11. | "You'll Make It" (Song ends at 3:44, followed by an audio recording of a conversation with the band at 12:34) | 13:39 |
| Total length: | | 47:05 |

19 ¼ anniversary edition
| No. | Title | Length |
|---|---|---|
| 1. | "24 Story Love Affair" | 3:37 |
| 2. | "Second Chance" | 3:42 |
| 3. | "When I'm With You" | 3:41 |
| 4. | "You'll Make It" | 3:51 |
| 5. | "Died in Your Arms" (bonus track) | 3:42 |
| 6. | "Second Chance" (acoustic) | 3:25 |
| 7. | "Tongue Tied" | 3:30 |
| 8. | "Time Bomb" | 2:43 |
| 9. | "Summer Fades to Fall" | 3:21 |
| 10. | "Sleepless Nights (Never Let Her Go)" | 3:25 |
| 11. | "Obvious" | 2:58 |
| 12. | "Tongue Tied" (featuring Trevor McNevan of FM Static) (acoustic) | 3:25 |
| 13. | "Time Bomb" (acoustic) | 2:46 |

== Personnel ==
Adapted from the Seven Second Surgery media notes.

Faber Drive

- Dave Faber – lead vocals, guitar
- David Joshua Hinsley – guitar, backing vocals
- Jeremy 'Krikit' Liddle – bass, backing vocals
- Raymond 'Red' Bull – drums, backing vocals

Additional musicians

- Brian Howes
- Daniel Adair
- Robin Diaz
- Pat Steward
- Lance LaPointe
- Tommy Walter
- Scotty-Win
- Mile Foxx Hill
- Ryan Van Poederooyen

Production

- Brian Howes – producer
- Joey Moi – producer, engineering, mixing
- Scott Cooke (Scotty Win) – assistant, digital editing
- Jay Van Poederooyen – digital editing
- Ryan Anderson, Alex Aligizakis – additional editing and assisting
- Ted Jensen – mastering
- Jaclyn Roste – runner
- Chad Kroeger – additional production

Miscellaneous

- Sandy Brummels – creative director
- Christopher Kornmann – art direction & design (Spit and Image)
- Doug Cunningham – cover illustration (Morning Breath)
- Marina Chavez – photography
- Jon Minson – logo
- Paul and Isabelle – styling

== Charts ==
Chart performance for Seven Second Surgery
| Chart (2007) | Peak position |
|---|---|
| Canadian Albums (Nielsen SoundScan) | 42 |

== Certifications ==
Certifications and sales for Seven Second Surgery
| Region | Certification | Certified units/sales |
|---|---|---|
| Canada (Music Canada) | Gold | 50,000^{‡} |
^{‡} Sales+streaming figures based on certification alone.

== Release history ==
Release history and formats for Seven Second Surgery
| Region | Date | Format | Label | Ref. |
|---|---|---|---|---|
| Canada | May 1, 2007 | Digital download | 604 | |
| Canada | October 9, 2007 | CD | 604 | |
| United States | October 9, 2007 | CD; digital download | Universal | |
