= Faber Drive =

Canadian pop punk band

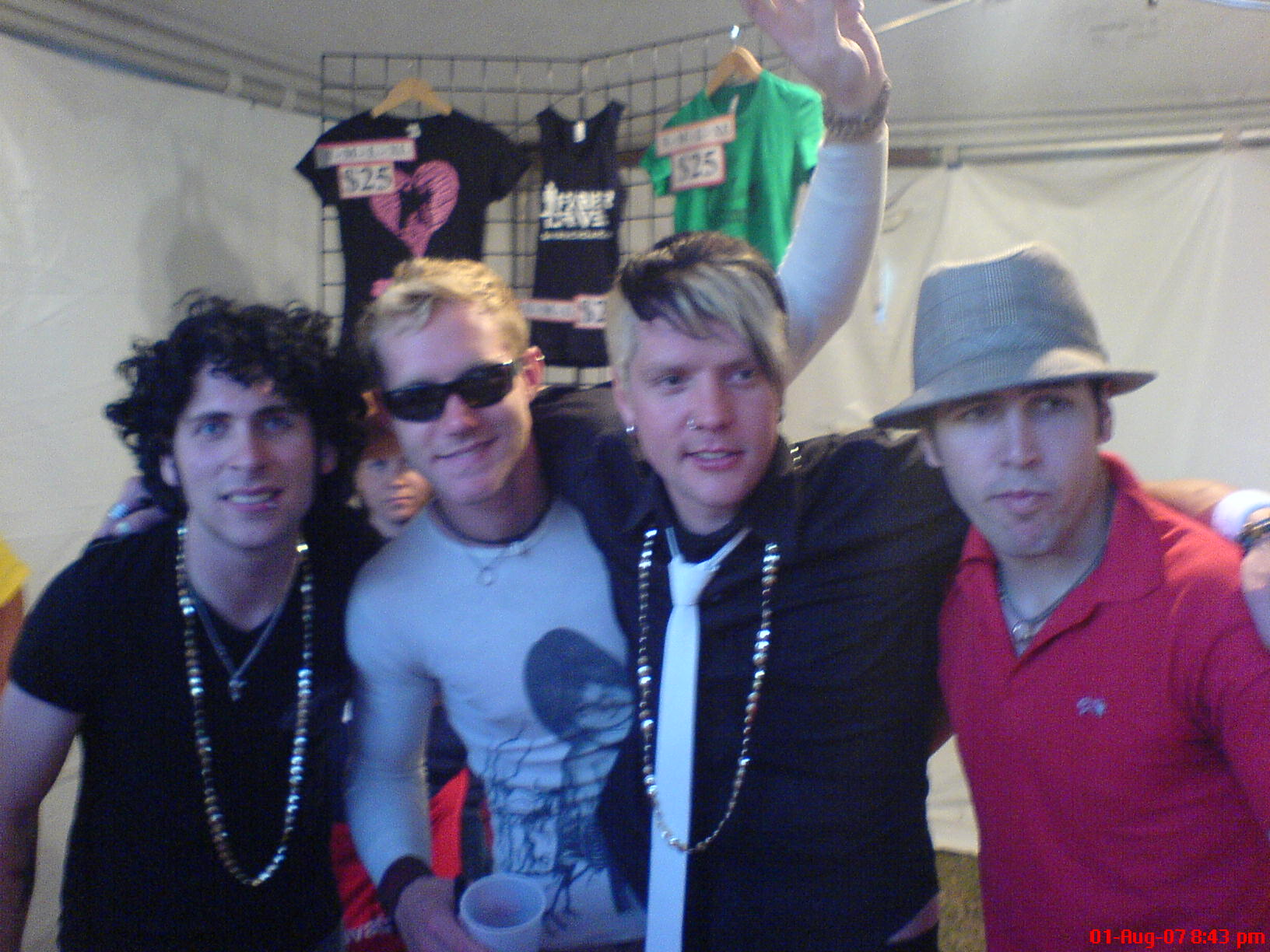
- Faber Drive in 2007

Background information
- Origin: Mission, British Columbia, Canada
- Genres: Pop punk; pop rock; electropop; country rock
- Years active: 2004–present
- Labels: 604; Universal Music Canada
- Members: Dave Faber; Nate Cavalli; Bailey Jacobsen; Seamus O'Neill
- Past members: Ray Bull; David Hinsley; Calvin Lechner; Andrew Stricko; Jordan Prichett; Jeremy Liddle
- Website: www.faberdrive.ca

Faber Drive is a Canadian pop punk band from Mission, British Columbia, formed in 2004. The band consists of lead vocalist Dave Faber, lead guitarist Nate Cavalli, bass guitarist Bailey Jacobsen, and drummer Seamus O'Neill. Their biggest influences are U2, The Police, Def Leppard, Jimmy Eat World, Stryper, and Winger. They have toured with bands such as Hedley, Stereos, and Metro Station. They have been nominated for a Juno Award and had multiple hit songs across the world including "Tongue Tied", "Second Chance", "You & I Tonight", and "When I'm With You", the band have played alongside some of Canada's most successful acts such as Marianas Trench, Simple Plan, Brian Melo, and Nickelback.

== History ==
=== 2004–2006: Early years and Faber EP ===
The band originated in 2004, in Mission, British Columbia, first under the name "Faber". Prior to forming the band, lead singer Dave Faber worked as a private music teacher, giving guitar and drum lessons. After three years of instruction, he decided to form the band, first recruiting drummer Ray "Red" Bull, one of his first drum students, before adding lead guitarist David Hinsley and bassist Jeremy "Krikkit" Liddle to complete the lineup. In 2005, the group competed in Fox Seeds, the band competition of Vancouver radio station CFOX-FM, where they submitted the song "Sex and Love" on the day of the deadline. Faber recalled almost giving up as he felt they were "not good enough," stating, "I actually got back in my car and pulled away. Then I decided to go back, so I turned the car around and I got up in the office just before it closed and handed in the disc." They ultimately won the competition. They also released a demo tape which caught the attention of Nickelback's producer Joey Moi and songwriter Brian Howes. Through their connections with Nickelback and Howes, who co-wrote songs for the band Hinder, they got into contract with Hinder's manager, Kevin Zaruk, and opened for some of Nickelback's Canadian tour dates. This also led to the band being signed by Chad Kroeger to his 604 Records label in May 2006.

In 2006, the band released their debut Faber EP, under Universal Music Canada. The EP includes three tracks: "Sex and Love," "24 Story Love Affair," and "Cementhead." It was recorded at Mountain View Studios in Abbotsford, British Columbia, and produced by Joey Moi and Brian Howes. Two songs — "Sex and Love" and "24 Story Love Affair", were re-recorded for their debut studio album, Seven Second Surgery (2007), while "Cementhead" remained exclusive to this early release. In February and March 2006, the band supported Hedley on their Cross Canada tour, along with MxPx. Around this time, the group changed their name to "Faber Drive", due to legal issues with a large corporation of the same name.

=== 2007–2008: Seven Second Surgery ===
After signing with 604 Records, the band connected with Joey Moi for pre-production and Brian Howes to co-write with Faber. The group released their debut single "Second Chance" on February 1, 2007. The song peaked at number 26 on the Canadian Hot 100. A few weeks after releasing their debut single, the band announced that their debut studio album Seven Second Surgery, would be released in the spring of 2007. Written over the course of three years, Faber said the album's title came from when they were coming up with a new band name and "Seven Second Surgery" was one of them. Ultimately, they decided that the name was better suited as an album title. It was officially released on May 1, 2007. A CD sampler was also released containing four tracks from the album and a music video for "Second Chance". In August 2007, the group released the album's second single "Tongue Tied", along with its music video. The song became one of the group's most commercially successful singles, reaching number 17 on the Canadian Hot 100 and was certified gold by Music Canada. The album's third single "When I'm with You", was released in January 2008, and peaked at number 19 on the Canadian Hot 100. It also reached the top three on the Canada Hot AC airplay chart and was certified gold by Music Canada. "Sleepless Nights" featuring Brian Melo, was released on July 29, 2008, as the fourth and final single from the album.

In March 2008, the group embarked on a tour in support of the album and was joined by Hello Operator. In April 2008, Ray Bull left the band and was replaced by Calvin "Poncho" Lechner. A few months later, guitarist David Hinsley quit and was replaced by Zubin Thakkar. They continued touring in the summer and had previously toured with Canadian Idol winner Brian Melo and Marianas Trench. The group also became involved with charity World Vision Canada. From August to September, the band supported Simple Plan on their Canadian tour, joining Metro Station and Cute Is What We Aim For.

At the 2008 Juno Awards, Faber Drive was nominated as New Group of the Year. The band's single "Second Chance" won the group Best New Hot Adult Contemporary Group of the Year, as well as a nomination for New Solo Artist of the Year at the 2008 Canadian Radio Music Awards.

The Faber Drive songs "Killin' Me" and "Summer Fades to Fall" appeared in American drama television series Kyle XY. The band also physically appeared on the show, playing in concert (Episode 3.02, "Psychic Friend", January 19, 2009).

=== 2009–2011: Can't Keep a Secret ===
In late 2008, the band started releasing material from their forthcoming second studio album, releasing a demo track titled "By Your Side". The group also saw another line-up change, with guitarist Jordan Pritchett, son of country singer Aaron Pritchett, and drummer Andrew Stricko joining the band and replacing Hinsley and Lechner. On July 21, 2009, the band released "G-Get Up and Dance" as the lead single from their second album. The track was produced by Faber, Dave "Rave" Ogilvie (Nine Inch Nails) and Colin "Crocker" Friesen. The song was certified Platinum by Music Canada, reaching number six on the Canadian Hot 100. The band's second studio album, Can't Keep a Secret, was released on November 10, 2009. According to Faber, the band wanted to be a lot more involved with the songwriting and producing process compared to their first. Musically, the album sees the band focusing on an electropop sound, different from their pop punk-influenced debut album. The album's second single, "Give Him Up" was released on December 15, 2009. Co-written by Josh Ramsay of Marianas Trench, the song peaked at number 26 on the Canadian Hot 100. It was certified Platinum by Music Canada. "You and I Tonight" was released on March 25, 2010, as the third single from the album. It peaked at number 49 on the Canadian Hot 100 and number nine on the Canada Hot AC chart.

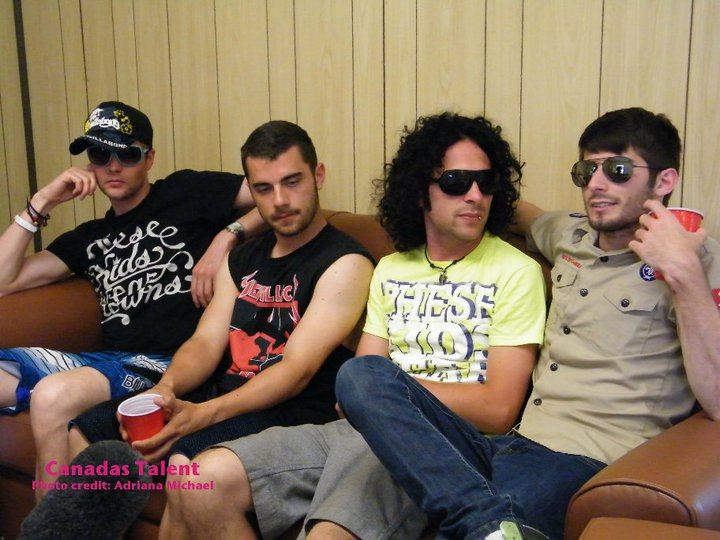
Faber Drive in 2011

In support of the album, the band toured with Hedley, Stereos and Fefe Dobson, before embarking on their headling the Can't Keep a Secret tour, with support from The Latency, These Kids Wear Crowns, Jesse Labelle and The New Cities. In March 2010, Faber took part in Young Artists for Haiti to raise funds to support the victims of the 2010 earthquake performing K'naan's "Wavin' Flag". In July 2010, the group performed at the Cisco Ottawa Bluesfest. The album's fourth and final single "The Payoff", was released on November 23, 2010.

"G-Get Up and Dance" was nominated for Pop Video of the Year at the 2010 MuchMusic Video Awards. The song was also nominated for Favorite Single of the Year at the 2010 Independent Music Awards. At the 2011 Juno Awards, Can't Keep a Secret was nominated as Pop Album of the Year.

=== 2012–2013: Lost in Paradise ===
The band released their third studio album, Lost in Paradise, on August 28, 2012. The album features a blend of ballads and party songs, a decision explained by Faber as "the most important thing for us." The album's lead single "Do It In Hollywood" was released on March 13, 2012, and a video was shot for the song. The second single from the album, "Candy Store" was released on June 19, 2012, and features Ish. The song peaked at number 76 on the Canadian Hot 100. The band was featured on the song "Hartwin Cole" by Belly, with its music video released on August 9, 2012. A music video for "Candy Store" premiered on September 18, 2012, via MuchMusic. The band headed across Canada on the Lost in Paradise tour starting in the fall of 2012, to the spring of 2013. Prior to the tour, Andrew Stricko left the band and Seamus O'Neill replaced him.

On February 14, 2013, the album's third single "Life Is Waiting" was released. It reached number 86 on the Canadian Hot 100. A music video was also released on May 1. They visited Singapore to perform two shows for Music Matters and performed at Canadian festivals during the summer of 2013, including the Big Red Music Festival. They released the album's fourth and final single "Too Little Too Late" on August 27, 2013, featuring Pierre Bouvier of Simple Plan. The song "Dead On The Dancefloor" featuring Proper Villains, was featured on a promotional sampler in 2014, released by Warner Music Philippines.

=== 2013–present: Non-album releases and Lifeline EP ===
In September 2013, they performed a benefit concert in Abbotsford. The following year, the band played one concert, appearing with Simple Plan in Kirkland Lake, Ontario. By 2014, releases from the band became stagnant, as the members became involved in different projects. Faber started writing and producing outside of the band, Jordan Pritchett formed a band with his girlfriend, Seamus O'Neill played drums for other artists such as Aaron Pritchett and Shawn Austin, and Jeremy Liddle joined a few local cover bands in Vancouver.

On December 4, 2016, the band held a reunion concert with special guests at the Hard Rock Casino Vancouver, then released a Christmas song called "We 3 Kings". On August 5, 2018, they released a new single called "Surrender". During an interview with Canadian Beats, Faber stated the song was inspired by his marriage which had reached a rough point in his life. He also revealed that more music would be released and that the band was fully independent. In February 2019, the band released a collaboration single with Faber's son Isaiah, rapper Powfu, titled "To Be With You". In April 2019, the band released the single "What Are We Waiting For" with Wolfgang Pander and Tamara Umlah, with a music video also released. Another single titled "Night Like This" was released on June 14, 2019, featuring Wolfgang Pander, Rod Black and former Faber Drive guitarist David Hinsley. In July 2019, "Mr Good For Nothin" was released. The band released a couple more collaborations with Powfu: "Chocolate Milk" and "I Can See the Light". They collaborated with The Faceplants on an acoustic cover of "Have You Ever Seen the Rain?" and, with Faber's daughter Patience, aka Sleep.Ing, on "You Lift Me Up".

In 2020, they released demos for "Can We Talk", "Is Heaven Where You Are", and "Me Myself and I".

On March 3, 2023, Faber Drive released a single titled "Never Gone". On October 18, 2024, Faber Drive released the single "Life Out Here," the track features country-inspired instrumentation and themes of rural simplicity and nostalgia. They also appeared at several Canadian music festivals and community events. The band performed at Bluewater Borderfest in Sarnia. They were also featured at the All Your Friends Fest, and participated in Cochrane Canada Day celebrations in the Calgary area.

The band's second extended play, Lifeline, was released independently on April 25, 2025, through Tongue Tied Music Group. The four-track EP includes the title track "Lifeline," a reimagined version of "death bed (coffee for your head)," an acoustic cover of Creedence Clearwater Revival’s "Have You Ever Seen the Rain," and the original song "Payday." The EP was the band's first major release following their 2024 single "Life Out Here".

The band is scheduled to perform at the 2026 Playback Music Festival from May 8 to 9.

== Musical styles and influences ==
Faber Drive's music is described as pop punk, pop rock, electropop and country rock. The band has cited influences from U2, The Police, Def Leppard and Jimmy Eat World. Singer Dave Faber said he used to study The Beatles, stating, "the one thing that they always said was that they wanted to make sure that every part of every song was amazing." He also used Three Days Grace's "I Hate Everything About You" as an influence, wanting to "be honest and true to who we are [...] but we wanted every part of every song to be captivating at the same time."

The band's first album Seven Second Surgery is described as pop punk and pop rock.

== Band members ==
=== Current ===
- Dave Faber – lead vocals, guitar (2004–present)
- Nate Cavalli – lead guitar, backing vocals (2025–present)
- Bailey Jacobsen – bass, backing vocals (2025–present)
- Seamus O'Neill – drums, backing vocals (2012–present)

=== Former ===
- Ray 'red' Bull – drums, backing vocals (2004–2008)
- David Hinsley – lead guitar, backing vocals (2004–2008)
- Calvin Lechner – drums, backing vocals (2008)
- Andrew Stricko – drums, backing vocals (2009–2012)
- Jordan "JP" Pritchett – lead guitar, backing vocals (2008–2025)
- Jeremy "Krikit" Liddle – bass, backing vocals (2004–2025)

=== Touring ===
- Zubin Thakkar – lead guitar and backing vocals (2008)
- Simon Nagel – lead guitar and backing vocals (2008)
- Douglas Graden Emmott – lead guitar and backing vocals (2024)
- Marcel Ketting-Oliver – bass, backing vocals (2024)
- Marcus Ramsay – lead guitar and backing vocals (2025)
- Darcy Johnstone – bass, backing vocals (2025)

Timeline

== Discography ==
Studio albums

- Seven Second Surgery (2007)
- Can't Keep a Secret (2009)
- Lost in Paradise (2012)

== Awards and nominations ==
Year	Association	Category	Nominated work	Result	Ref.
2008	Canadian Radio Music Awards	Best New Solo Artist of the Year	"Second Chance"	Nominated	
2008	Canadian Radio Music Awards	Best New Hot Adult Contemporary Group of the Year	"Second Chance"	Won	
2008	Juno Awards	New Group of the Year	Faber Drive	Nominated	
2010	MuchMusic Video Awards	Pop Video of the Year	"G-Get Up and Dance"	Nominated	
2010	Independent Music Awards	Astral Media Radio Favourite Single	"G-Get Up and Dance"	Nominated	
2011	Juno Awards	Pop Album of the Year	Can't Keep a Secret	Nominated	
