= Rod Black (singer) =

- Genres: Country rock
- Occupation: Singer-songwriter
- Years active: 2007–present
- Label: Southern Row Records
- Website: www.rodblackmusic.com

Rod Black is a Canadian country rock singer-songwriter and the lead singer of hard rock band Jet Black Stare. In 2014, Black launched a solo career with the release of the single "Keepin' On" to country radio. It peaked at number 22 on the Billboard Canada Country chart. Black was nominated at the 2015 Canadian Radio Music Awards for Best New Group or Solo Artist: Country for the song. Black's second solo single, "Long Gone", was released in March 2015. A music video for the song premiered in May. At the 2015 British Columbia Country Music Association Awards, Black was nominated for Rising Star.

== Discography ==
=== Singles ===
Year	Single	Peak positions
Year	Single	CAN Country
2014	"Keepin' On"	22
2015	"Long Gone"	—
2016	"Miles to Go"	—
"—" denotes releases that did not chart

=== Music videos ===
Year	Video	Director
2015	"Long Gone"	Grant Vetters
2016	"Go Big or Go Home"	Gene Greenwood
2016	"Miles to Go"	Gene Greenwood
