= Faber (EP) =

EP by Faber Drive
- Released: 2006
- Recorded: Mountain View Studios (Abbotsford, BC)
- Genre: Pop-punk
- Length: 9:21
- Label: 604
- Producer: Joey Moi & Brian Howes

Faber Drive chronology
Faber (2006)	Seven Second Surgery (2007)

Faber is the self-titled EP by Canadian pop-punk band Faber Drive, released prior to their name change. Released in limited quantities, it is packaged in a black and white cardsleeve and features three tracks. The first two were eventually re-released on their debut studio album Seven Second Surgery in 2007. The third track, Cementhead, is only available on this release.

The EP was re-issued on June 3, 2016.

== Background ==
Originating in 2004, in Mission, British Columbia, first under the name "Faber", the band's line-up consisted of lead vocalist Dave Faber, guitarist David Hinsley, bassist Jeremy Liddle and drummer Ray Bull. In 2005, the group competed in Fox Seeds, the band competition of Vancouver radio station CFOX-FM, where they submitted the song "Sex and Love" on the day of the deadline, ultimately winning the contest. A demo tape was later released, which caught the attention of Nickelback's producer Joey Moi and songwriter Brian Howes.

Their self-titled EP was produced by Joey Moi and Brian Howes, recorded at Mountain View Studios in Abbotsford, British Columbia.

== Track listing ==
All tracks are written by Dave Faber and Brian Howes, except where noted.

No.	Title	Writer(s)	Length
1.	"Sex and Love"		2:58
2.	"24 Story Love Affair"		3:32
3.	"Cementhead"	Blair Dobson; Dave Genn; Brad McGiveron; Rich Priske	2:54
Total length:			9:21

== Personnel ==
Credits adapted from the album's liner notes.

Faber Drive

- Dave Faber – lead vocals, guitar
- David Joshua Hinsley – guitar
- Jeremy 'Krikit' Liddle – bass, backing vocals
- Raymond 'Red' Bull – drums

Additional musicians

- Robyn Diaz – drums
- Dave Genn – guitar
- Josh Ramsay – bass, keyboards

Production

- Joey Moi – producer, engineer, mixing, recording
- Brian Howes – producer, recording
- Jamie Sitar – mastering

Published by Riispafa Music Publishing
Except for "Cementhead" publishing administered by: Divine Industries on behalf of DSK

== Release history ==
Release history and formats for Faber
Region	Date	Format	Label	Ref.
Canada	2006	CD	Universal Music Canada	
Canada	June 3, 2006	CD	Universal Music Canada	
