= Ishan Morris =

Canadian actor, singer (active 2000– )

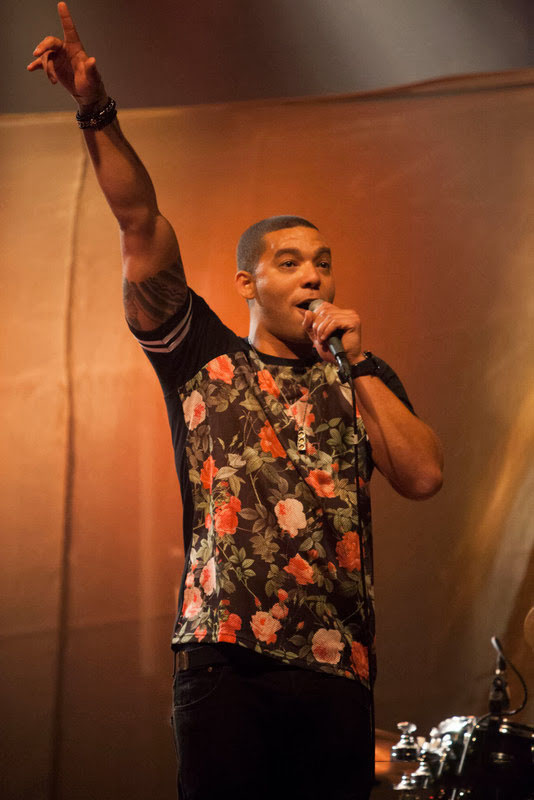
- iSH at the Virgin Mobile MOD Club in Toronto (2013)

Background information
- Also known as: iSH, Ish Morris
- Genres: Hip hop, pop, R&B
- Occupations: Singer, actor, recording artist
- Instrument: Vocals
- Years active: 2000–present
- Website: www.ishmusic.ca

Ishan Morris, also known by his stage name iSH, is a Canadian actor and singer. In his acting roles he is also credited at times as Ish Morris.

== Acting career ==
After graduation, Morris launched an acting career where he started appearing in commercials, films, and TV shows. He starred in the television series "Soul" alongside Keshia Chanté. He also landed a recurring role in The Family Channel's series "Baxter" and had a role in Saw 3D.

== Musical career ==
The first single that Morris released, "Falling in Love With You", made it to the top 40 on Canadian radio and mediabase charts. He released the mixtape The Name is iSH, accompanied by his single "Priceless" off his debut album The First Impression, on Northern Heights Records. A music video was also released for "Priceless", directed by Grandson and Son and shot in the Cayman Islands.

Morris has worked with artists such as Cory Lee, Robyn, and La Roux. In 2013, he released the single "Rollin'" featuring Stef Lang. After that success, he was featured in Cody Simpsons hit "Pretty Brown Eyes". In 2014 "Light Up", featuring Daniel Richter the lead singer of Eleven Past One. was included in iSH's EP Up & Up on Warner Music Canada. He is also featured on the Faber Drive single, "Candy Store".

== Discography ==
=== Albums ===
- 2011: The First Impression [Northern Heights Records]

Track list:

1. "Body Language" (3:46)
2. "Cocktail Waitress" (2:59)
3. "Come Get It" (3:13)
4. "Cut to the Chase" (3:45)
5. "Falling In Love With You" (3:39)
6. "Gotta Go" (3:52)
7. "Innocent" (3:34)
8. "Seize the Day" (3:39)
9. "Trippin on My Words" (3:53)
10. "Priceless" (3:28)
11. "The Name Is iSH" (2:41)
12. "This Goes Out" (3:38)

=== Mixtapes ===
- 2010: The Name Is iSH

Track list

1. "Heaven Anyway" (2:24) – (Produced by Pretty Lights)
2. "Brick by Brick" (4:00) – (Produced by Spadez)
3. "Hustle to Be Free" (feat. Tunng) (3:32)
4. "Cocktail Waitress" (2:58)
5. "Cobrastyle" (Remix) (feat. Robyn) (2:49)
6. "How You Like Me Now?" (2:52) – (Produced by Mikey Bo)
7. "Tonight's The Night" (feat. Cory Lee) (3:44) – (Produced by HWB)
8. "My Way" (feat. Mateo Jordache) (3:17)
9. "Thanks for Nothing" (3:19) – (Produced by Bezo)
10. "The Name is iSH" (2:41) – (Produced by Don Diablo)
11. "It Is What It Is" (3:10)
12. "Streets Are Getting Hot" (2:50)
13. "Still The Same" (feat. Naya Marie) (4:08) – (Produced by Bezo)
14. "Feelin Myself" (2:23)
15. "Seizures" (2:36) – (Cuts by Dj Greedo)
16. "Bulletproof" (Remix) (feat. La Roux) (3:27)
17. "No Struggle" (4:06) – (Produced by Cylla)
18. "Seize the Day" (feat. Cory Lee) (3:39) – (Produced by Bezo)
- 2012: (THR3MIX)

Track list

1. "Demons" feat. e-dubble (2:28)
2. "Never Gonna Let You Go" with Esthero (3:20)
3. "End of the Story" (4:02)
4. "Dreamer (3:43)
5. "So Long" (3:10)

=== EPs ===
- 2014: Up & Up

Track list

1. "I'm Home" (3:11)
2. "Rebel" (feat. Faber) (3:13)
3. "Rollin'" (feat. Stef Lang) (3:19)
4. "You Got It" (3:12)
5. "Renegades" (4:34)
6. "Light Up" (feat. Daniel Richter) (2:53)
7. "Happy When It's Gone" (3:35)

=== Singles ===
Year	Album	Peak positions	Album	Music video
Year	Album	CAN	Album	Music video
2009	"Falling in Love With You"	–	The First Impression	
2010	"This Goes Out"	–	The First Impression	
2010	"Priceless"	–	The First Impression	
2010	"Hustle to be Free"	–	My name Is iSH	
2013	"Rollin' " (feat. Stef Lang)	64	Up & Up EP	
2013	"You Got It"	–	Up & Up EP	
2014	"Light Up" (feat. Daniel Richter)	–	Up & Up EP	

Collaborations

- His single "Falling in Love With You" features Cory Lee
- "CobraStyle" recording features Robyn
- iSH has made a remix of La Roux song "Bulletproof" under the title "Bulletproof (The Remix)" by iSH feat. La Roux
- "Candy Store" by Faber Drive featuring iSH (604 Records, 2012)
- His single "Rollin'" features Stef Lang
- His single "Light Up" features Daniel Richter
- He collaborated with rapper E-Dubble for his song Make Like a Tree

== Filmography ==
- 2000: Cul de sac (short) as a squirt
- 2002: Conviction (TV movie) as a gangster
- 2003: 1-800-Missing (TV series) (1 episode "Basic Training" as bag boy)
- 2008: ReGenesis (TV series) (1 episode "Unbottled" as a terrorist)
- 2009: Soul (TV series) (5 episodes) as Malcolm in episodes: "My Way", "Fathers and Daughters", "Seducing Spirits", "Twice" and "Stepping Through Doors"
- 2009: The Border (TV series) (1 episode, "Missing in Action" as Sgt. Fred James) -- credited as Ish Morris
- 2010: Baxter (TV series) (in 3 episodes "Cry Me a River", "Dance Craze-Y" and "Mock vs Rock" as Mr Fellini)
- 2010: Harriet the Spy: Blog Wars (TV movie) as TV Host -- credited as Ish Morris
- 2010: Saw 3D (Movie) as Alex
- 2012: My Babysitter's a Vampire (TV series) (1 episode "Welcome Back Dusker" as Vampire Thug #1)
- 2012: Transporter: The Series (TV Series) (1 episode "Payback" as Anton)
- 2013: Defiance (TV Series) (2 episodes " The Devil in the Dark" and "If I Ever Leave This World Alive" as Rathus)
- 2014: RoboCop (Movie) (as Armed Sentry at Decrepit House)
- 2015: Riftworld Chronicles (TV Mini-Series) (8 episodes as Khaleesh)
- 2015: Dark Matter (TV Series) (1 episode "1.6" as Rebel #1)
- 2015: Degrassi: Don't Look Back (TV Movie) (as Abe)
- 2015: Lost Girl (TV Series) (1 episode "Rise" as Police Officer)
- 2016: The Girlfriend Experience (TV Series) (2 episodes "Blindsided", "Available" as Paramedic)
- 2016: Private Eyes (TV Series) (1 episode "Mise en Place" as Young Cop)
- 2016: Suits (TV Series) (1 episode "Quid Pro Quo" as Russell)
- 2017: The Handmaid's Tale (TV Series) (1 episode "Nolite Te Bastardes Carborundorum" as Guardian Nurse)
- 2017: Arrow (TV Series) (1 episode "Missing" as A.R.G.U.S. Guard #1)
- 2017: Zoo (TV Series) (1 episode "Wham, Bam, Thank You Sam" as Paramedic)
- 2017: Supernatural (TV Series) (1 episode "Lost and Found" as Conrad)
- 2017: (Movie) (as Mike)
- 2018: iZombie (TV Series) (1 episode "Brainless in Seattle, Part 2" as Erik)
- 2018: The Expanse (TV Series) (1 episode "IFF" as UN Deputy)
- 2018: Taken (TV Series) (1 episode "ACGT" as Marco)
- 2018: Killjoys (TV Series) (5 episodes "Johnny Dangerously", "Bro-d Trip", "Greening Pains", O Mother, Where Art Thou", "The Kids Are Alright" as Weej)
- 2018: The Christmas Chronicles (Movie) (as Thug#1)
- 2019: In the Dark (TV Series) (1 episode "I Woke Up Like This" as Police Officer)
- 2019: Batwoman (TV Series) (2 episodes "Pilot", "The Rabbit Hole" as Crows Agent Vasquez/Crows Agent #2)
- 2019: Titans (TV Series) (1 episode "Fallen" as Caleb)
- 2019: Larry (Movie) (Mateo's Dad)
- 2022: Christmas Lucky Charm (Movie) (as Liam Bodle)

== Awards and nominations ==
- In 2009, nominated for "Best Urban Single" at the Canadian Radio Music Awards for the single "Falling in Love With You"
