= Victoria Duffield =

Canadian singer, actress (born 1995)

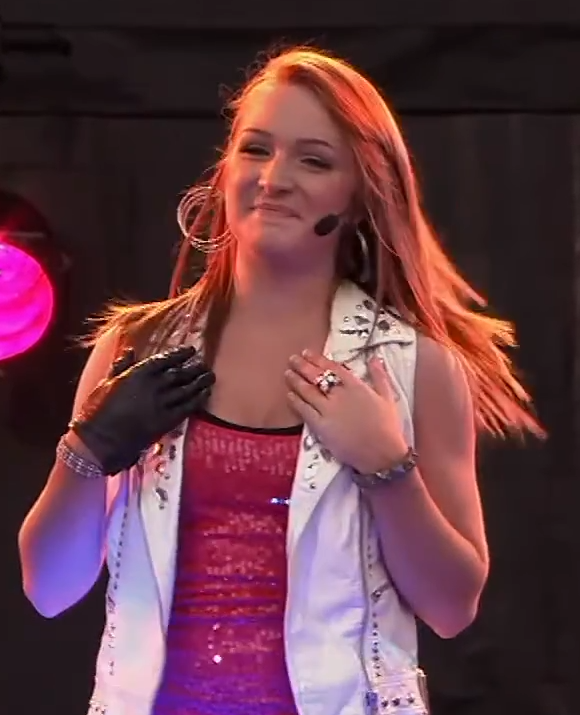
- Duffield in Mr. Young

Background information
- Born: Victoria Eileen Elizabeth Duffield; January 3, 1995 (age 31); Abbotsford, British Columbia, Canada
- Genres: Dance-pop; electropop; teen pop
- Occupations: Singer, songwriter, dancer, actress
- Instrument: Vocals
- Years active: 2005–2024
- Labels: Warner Music Canada; Independent
- Website: www.victoriaduffield.com

Victoria Eileen Elizabeth Duffield (born January 3, 1995) is a Canadian former singer, songwriter, dancer, and actress. She is best known for her debut single "Shut Up and Dance", which peaked at number 12 on the Canadian Hot 100 chart in 2011 and was certified platinum by the Canadian Recording Industry Association (CRIA). Duffield gained recognition after appearing as a finalist on the third season of the YTV reality competition series The Next Star in 2010, signing with Warner Music Canada the following year. Her debut studio album Shut Up and Dance (2012) also saw the commercial success of the single "Break My Heart", which peaked at number 35 on the Canadian Hot 100 and was certified gold.

Duffield's second studio album, Accelerate (2014), was a commercial failure but saw the moderate success of its lead single, "More Than Friends", which peaked at number 49 on the Canadian Hot 100. She released her third and final studio album independently in 2019, Day Won. As an actress, Duffield is best known as the singing voice of Cherry Jam in Strawberry Shortcake's Berry Bitty Adventures. She has also appeared as a guest star on several Canadian television series, including Mr. Young.

Duffield retired from the entertainment industry in 2024 when she became a real estate agent.

== Early life ==
Victoria Duffield was born in Abbotsford, British Columbia. She has two brothers. The older, Burkely Duffield (b. 1992), appeared on the television series House of Anubis. Her other brother is Mitchell Duffield. Duffield graduated from Yale Secondary School in 2013.

== Career ==
=== The Next Star ===
Duffield auditioned for season 3 of The Next Star, a Canadian reality competition series, in May 2010. After being one of 16 Canadian teens selected from over 4000, she flew to Toronto to sing for three judges, and was selected to be in the Top 6, along with Isabelle Stern, Mimoza Duot, Madi Amyotte, Brandon Bizior, and Diego Gomes. She sang and performed multiple tasks during the show, such as co-writing a single, singing solo, duets, group song selections, receiving a make-over, and filming a music video. Duffield worked with producer Josh Ramsay, lead vocalist of the Canadian pop rock band Marianas Trench. Their collaboration resulted in the song "Fever". On September 26, 2010, Duffield lost The Next Star to 14-year-old Diego Gomes.

=== 2010–2012: Shut Up and Dance ===
Duffield released her single "Fever" on iTunes in September 2010, accompanied by a music video. Soon after, she independently released her debut extended play, Secrets, which included two singles: "Bam Bam" and "Hey!!!" After signing with Warner Music Canada, Duffield released her major-label debut single in July 2011, "Shut Up and Dance", which peaked number 12 on the Canadian Hot 100 chart. She also released a bilingual English/French version for the French Canadian market featuring singer Lukay.

Duffield's debut studio album of the same name, Shut Up and Dance, was released in August 2012. Three additional singles were released from the album: "Feel", "Break My Heart"—which peaked at number 35 on the Canadian Hot 100 and was later certified gold—and "They Don't Know About Us", a duet with Cody Simpson. Duffield toured Canada with Faber Drive on their Lost in Paradise Tour to support Shut Up and Dance, which finished in December 2012 in Trenton, Nova Scotia.

=== 2013–2024: Accelerate and Day Won ===
In 2013, Duffield announced that she was recording new music in Los Angeles, California. Her second studio album, Accelerate, was released in June 2014 and failed to chart in any countries. However, its lead single, "More Than Friends", reached number 49 on the Canadian Hot 100. She also toured with the Backstreet Boys on the second North American leg of their In a World Like This Tour. Following the tour, Duffield sustained injuries to her vocal cords and underwent surgery at Cedars-Sinai Medical Center in Los Angeles, resulting in a brief hiatus from performing. By Duffield's account, she had a new single scheduled for release in 2017, but was informed that Warner Music Canada was no longer working with her management team and she was subsequently dropped from the label.

In February 2018, Duffield independently released her first single in nearly four years, "WOW", and announced that she would be independently releasing her third studio album, Day 1, which she had been working on for over three years. She then released three additional songs from the album: "Get Me High", "My Mistake", and "Remember You". In February 2019, Duffield announced via Instagram that she would be releasing her third and final studio album, now titled Day Won, on February 12, 2019 across music streaming platforms to celebrate the one-year anniversary of the release of "WOW".

== Charity ==
Duffield is a proud supporter of Free The Children and has performed at such events as We Day Manitoba. Duffield also supported the Count Me In movement, and performed at the inaugural Count Me In Conference in Toronto, Ontario, on May 1, 2012.

== Discography ==
=== Studio albums ===
Title	Year	Peak chart positions
Title	Year	CAN
Shut Up and Dance	Released: August 21, 2012; Label: Warner Music Canada; Format: CD, digital download	12
Accelerate	Released: June 3, 2014; Label: Warner Music Canada; Format: CD, digital download	—
Day Won	Released: February 12, 2019; Label: Independent; Format: Digital download, streaming	—

=== Extended plays ===
- 2010: Secrets

=== Singles ===
Year	Title	Peak chart positions	Certifications	Album
Year	Title	CAN	Certifications	Album
2011	"Shut Up and Dance"	12	CAN: Platinum	Shut Up and Dance
2012	"Feel"	37		Shut Up and Dance
2012	"Break My Heart"	35	CAN: Gold	Shut Up and Dance
2012	"They Don't Know About Us" (featuring Cody Simpson)	74		Shut Up and Dance
2014	"More Than Friends"	49		Accelerate
2014	"Paper Planes"	—		Accelerate

=== Promotional singles ===
- 2010: "Fever"
- 2010: "Hey!!!"
- 2010: "Bam Bam"
- 2011: "Last Christmas"
- 2012: "Feel" (and Version française featuring Jacynthe).
- 2012: "Break My Heart" (and Version française featuring Djen Silencieux.)
- 2018: "Get Me High"

== Filmography ==
Year	Title	Role	Notes
2005	Cold Squad	Elissa	TV series. 2 episodes: And the Fury: Part 2 The Filth: Part 1 (uncredited)
2007	Painkiller Jane	Young Elyse	TV series. 1 Episode: Breakdown
2007	Supernatural	Granddaughter	TV series. 1 Episode: Bedtime Stories
2008	Love Sick: Secrets of a Sex Addict	Zoe Fedder	TV film
2008	Smallville	Young Chloe Sullivan	TV series. 1 Episode: Abyss
2009	Do You Know Me	Isabel Carter	TV film. Starred along with Rachelle Lefevre
2010	The Next Star	Herself/Contestant	Reality TV competition. Top 6
2011	Strawberry Shortcake's Berry Bitty Adventures	Cherry Jam	Animated. Singing voice only
2012	Mr. Young	Herself	TV series. 2 episodes: Mr. Spring Break Mr. First Impression
2012	R.L. Stine's The Haunting Hour	Megan	Season 2 episode 31 Bad Feng Shui
2012	Christmas Miracle	Babysitter	Christian Film
2013	Life with Boys	Herself	Season 2 episode 14 Let's Duet With Boys Part Two
