= Lost in Paradise (Faber Drive album) =

Lost In Paradise

Studio album by Faber Drive
- Released: August 28, 2012
- Recorded: 2012
- Studio: Discomunky Studios (Mission, BC); InOurGarage Studios (Los Angeles, CA); MDS Recording/MK Productions (Toronto, ON); Mike Green Studios (Los Angeles, CA); NRG Studios (Los Angeles, CA); Sound Studios (Los Angeles, CA); The Pocket Studios (Toronto, ON); WineCellar Studios (Vancouver, BC)
- Genre: Electropop; dance-pop
- Length: 32:21
- Label: 604 Records
- Producer: Andrew Goldstein; Chris Perry; Colin Friesen; Dan Book; Justin Gray; Matt Squire; Mike Green; Mike Kiofos; Ryan Stewart; Shawn Desman

Faber Drive chronology
Can't Keep a Secret (2009)	Lost In Paradise (2012)	Lifeline (2025)

Singles from Lost in Paradise
- 1. "Do It in Hollywood" Released: March 13, 2012; 2. "Candy Store" Released: June 19, 2012; 3. "Life is Waiting" Released: February 14, 2013; 4. "Too Little Too Late" Released: August 27, 2013

Lost in Paradise is the third studio album by Canadian pop punk band Faber Drive. The album is supported by four singles: "Do It in Hollywood", "Candy Store", "Life is Waiting" and "Too Little Too Late", the latter was re-released with Pierre Bouvier of Simple Plan on vocals.

== Background and recording ==
After spending a year travelling on the road in Canada and the United States, the group wrote 70 songs for the album, collaborating with different songwriters, including Andrew Goldstein, Ryan Stewart and Pierre Bouvier, among many more. The group ultimately selected 10 songs they felt was "the strongest." A blend of ballads and party songs, singer Dave Faber explained this decision, "if it's a song that people can relate to, if it's a song that we feel passionate about, if it's a song that gives us chills... that's the most important thing for us."

The album was recorded at Discomunky Studios in Mission, British Columbia, InOurGarage, Mike Green, NRG and Sound Studios in Los Angeles, MDS Recording/MK Productions and The Pocket Studios in Toronto, and WineCellar Studios Vancouver.

== Composition and sound ==
The album is described as electropop and dance-pop. Speaking about the writing process, bassist Jeremy Liddle said, "Music is about emotion. Whether it's a party song like 'Set It Off' or 'Do It In Hollywood', or whether it's a love story like 'Candy Store', we want to have songs that make people feel different things."

== Release ==
The album's lead single "Do It In Hollywood" was released on March 13, 2012. The band released a music vide for the song on May 22, via VEVO. The second single from the album, "Candy Store" was released on June 19, featuring Ish. A music video for the song premiered on September 18, via MuchMusic. On February 14, 2013, the album's third single "Life Is Waiting" was released. A music video was also released on May 1. They released the album's fourth and final single "Too Little Too Late" on August 27, featuring Pierre Bouvier of Simple Plan.

The band embarked on their headlining Lost in Paradise tour in support of the album, touring across Canada in the fall of 2012 to the spring of 2013. Prior to the tour, drummer Andrew Stricko left the band and was replaced by Seamus O'Neill.

== Critical reception ==
Professional ratings
Review scores
Source	Rating
AllMusic	2.5/5 stars
Melodic	1.5/5 stars

The album was met with negative reviews from music critics. Fred Thomas of AllMusic said the album was "a logical step in their evolution, but moves noticeably away from the band's mall punk roots" and stated, "While some songs are catchy, many of the tracks feel constructed by a lab team somewhere with climbing the Top 40 charts in mind and nothing else. After the initial sugar buzz of the high-gloss production and chemically treated hooks wears off, we're left with a batch of pleasantly interchangeable tunes." Johan Wippsson of Melodic praised the tracks "Too Little Too Late" and "Inside Out", but felt that overall, the album was "impersonal and predictable."

== Track listing ==
Standard edition
No.	Title	Length
1.	"Set it Off"	3:07
2.	"Life is Waiting"	3:06
3.	"Candy Store" (featuring Ish)	3:16
4.	"Dead on the Dancefloor" (featuring Proper Villains)	3:16
5.	"Do It in Hollywood"	3:08
6.	"Too Little Too Late"	3:41
7.	"Lost In Paradise"	3:24
8.	"Inside Out"	3:03
9.	"Don't Stop"	2:43
10.	"Solitary"	3:40

Bonus Tracks
No.	Title	Length
11.	"Rock this Party" (featuring Stevano-U.G.O.)	3:02
12.	"All I Want"	3:12
13.	"Do It in Hollywood (Andrew Goldstein Remix)"	4:20
14.	"Candy Store" (Extended version)	3:29
15.	"Candy Store" (Acoustic version)	3:25

== Personnel ==
Credits adapted from album's liner notes.

Faber Drive

- Dave Faber – lead vocals, guitar
- Jordan "JP" Pritchett – backing vocals, guitar
- Jeremy "Krikit" Liddle – backing vocals, bass, keyboards
- Andrew Stricko – drums

Additional musicians

- Ish – additional vocals (track 3)
- Proper Villains – additional vocals (track 4)
- Andrew Goldstein – session musician
- Chris Perry – session musician
- Colin "Crocker" Friesen – session musician
- Justin Gray – session musician
- Matt Squire – session musician
- Mike Klose – session musician
- Mike Green – session musician
- Mike Kiofos – session musician
- Ryan Stewart – session musician
- Shawn Desman – session musician
- Simon Wilcox – session musician

Production

- Andrew Goldstein – producer, engineer, mixing, programming
- Chris Perry – producer, engineer, programming
- Colin "Crocker" Friesen – producer, engineer, programming
- Dan Book – producer, engineer
- Dave "Rave" Ogilvie – mixing
- Gene Grimaldi – mastering
- Justin Gray – producer, engineer, programming
- Kyle Black – assistant mixing
- Mark Maryanovich – photography
- Matt Squire – producer, engineer, programming
- Mike Green – producer, engineer, mixing, programming
- Mike Kiofos – producer, engineer, programming
- Murray Daigle – engineer
- Pedro Dzelme – mixing assistant
- Ryan Stewart – producer, engineer, programming
- Shawn Desman – producer, programming

== Release history ==
Release history and formats for Lost in Paradise
Region	Date	Format	Label	Ref.
Canada	August 28, 2012	CD; digital download	604; Universal Music Canada	
United States	August 13, 2013	CD	604	
