= Tongue Tied (Faber Drive song) =

Single by Faber Drive

from the album Seven Second Surgery
- Released: August 2007
- Studio: Mountainview Studios (Vancouver, British Columbia)
- Genre: Rock; emo
- Length: 3:31
- Label: Universal Records
- Songwriters: Chad Kroeger; Faber Drive; Brian Howes
- Producers: Kroeger; Howes; Joey Moi

Faber Drive singles chronology
"Second Chance" (2007)	"Tongue Tied" (2007)	"When I'm with You" (2008)

"Tongue Tied" is a song by Canadian pop punk band Faber Drive. It was released in August 2007, as the second single from their debut studio album, Seven Second Surgery. It did very well on the charts, peaking at number 17 on the Canadian Hot 100, and outperformed the previous single, "Second Chance", which reached number 26. A music video for the song was released and topped the MuchMusic Countdown in November 2007.

== Composition and lyrics ==
An original version of "Tongue Tied" was first released under the name "It Ends", posted onto MySpace by the band. They eventually re-wrote the song with Chad Kroeger and Brian Howes before recording Seven Second Surgery. The track was produced by Kroeger, Howes and Joey Moi. It was recorded at Mountainview Studios in Vancouver, British Columbia. The song is about a man struggling to keep his relationship together with his girlfriend, and how he cannot find the right words to please her.

== Critical reception ==
In an album review for their album Seven Second Surgery, Chris Fallon of AbsolutePunk.net said the song was "solely written with the intention of giving an audience one more excuse for holding up their Zippos." A writer for TuneLab stated that the track "has smash potential, packing a bit more meat on its bones than many songs of a similar ilk flooding the rock market."

== Chart performance ==
"Tongue Tied" peaked at number 17 on the Canadian Hot 100. On the Canada CHR/Top 40 and Canada Hot AC airplay charts, it reached numbers 10 and 8, respectively. The song reached number one on the Canada's Emerging Artists chart.

== Music video ==
The music video for "Tongue Tied" was released in August 2007, directed by Colin Minihan. The video reached number one on Canada's MuchMusic Countdown on the week of November 29, 2007.

In the video, a girl is taking a bath while a boy knocks on her door with flowers. She opens the door, immediately rejects him, and walks into another room down the hall. The boy throws the flowers across the room angrily, and they land in the bathtub. The band is shown playing in the basement of the apartment complex, with water dripping on their instruments. The video cuts back to the girl getting out of the bath. She proceeds to get dressed and go to sit in her room, where she looks at a picture of her and her boyfriend. It cuts back to the band playing in the basement; rose petals are now falling on the instruments along with the water. When it cuts back to the girl, the boy has just opened the door and is standing in the doorway. They make up, and the boy takes out a ring. The two kiss, and the water dripping into the basement recedes back into the bathtub.

== Personnel ==
Credits for "Tongue Tied" retrieved from CD single liner notes.

Faber Drive

- Dave Faber – lead vocals, guitar
- David Hinsley – lead guitar, backing vocals
- Jeremy Liddle – bass, backing vocals
- Ray Bull – drums, backing vocals

Production

- Brian Howes – producer
- Joey Moi – producer, mixing, engineer
- Chad Kroeger – additional production
- Scott Cooke – assistant engineer
- Ted Jensen – mastering

== Charts ==
Chart performance for "Tongue Tied"
Chart (2007)	Peak position
Canada (Canadian Hot 100)	17
Canada CHR/Top 40 (Billboard)	10
Canada Hot AC (Billboard)	8

== Certifications ==
Certifications for "Tongue Tied"
Region	Certification	Certified units/sales
Canada (Music Canada)	Platinum	80,000^{‡}
^{‡} Sales+streaming figures based on certification alone.

== Release history ==
Release dates and formats for "Tongue Tied"
Region	Date	Format	Label	Ref.
United States	August 2007	CD single	Universal Republic	
Various	July 15, 2008	Digital download	604	
