= Second Chance (Faber Drive song) =

Single by Faber Drive

from the album Seven Second Surgery
- Released: February 1, 2007
- Studio: Mountainview Studios (Abbotsford, British Columbia)
- Genre: Pop punk; power pop
- Length: 3:41
- Label: 604; Universal
- Songwriters: Chad Kroeger; Faber Drive; Brian Howes
- Producers: Kroeger; Howes; Joey Moi

Faber Drive singles chronology
| "Second Chance" (2007) | "Tongue Tied" (2007) |

Music video
- "Second Chance" on YouTube

"Second Chance" is the debut single by Canadian band Faber Drive, released on February 1, 2007, from their debut studio album, Seven Second Surgery. The song peaked at number 26 on the Canadian Hot 100, as well as number 11 and number 13 on the Canada CHR/Top 40 and Canada Hot AC airplay charts, respectively.

== Background ==
"Second Chance" was first released on February 1, 2007, in Canada for digital download. The song premiered via Melodic.net on March 20, 2007, before it was officially released elsewhere on March 27.

== Composition and lyrics ==
It was written by Faber Drive, Chad Kroeger and Brian Howes, while production was handled by Howes and Joey Moi, with additional production from Kroeger. The song was recorded at Mountainview Studios in Abbotsford, British Columbia. Lyrically, the song is about regret and frustration of backing out of a relationship prematurely: "Instead of holding you, I was holding out/ I should have let you in, but I let you down." Musically, critics have compared the track to U2 and Def Leppard, with AllMusic writer Jo-Ann Greene noting its "U2 influence."

== Music video ==
The music video for "Second Chance" was released on August 27, 2007, directed by Frank Borin. The video reached number six on Canada's MuchMusic Countdown on the week of July 20, 2007.

== Personnel ==
Credits for "Second Chance" retrieved from CD single liner notes.

Faber Drive

- Dave Faber – lead vocals, guitar
- David Hinsley – lead guitar, backing vocals
- Jeremy Liddle – bass, backing vocals
- Ray Bull – drums, backing vocals

Production

- Brian Howes – producer
- Joey Moi – producer, mixing, engineer
- Chad Kroeger – additional production
- Scott Cooke – assistant engineer, digital editing
- Jay van Poederooyen – digital editing
- Ryan Anderson – additional editing
- Alex Aligizakis – additional editing
- Ted Jensen – mastering

== Charts ==
Chart performance for "Second Chance"
| Chart (2007) | Peak position |
|---|---|
| Canada (Canadian Hot 100) | 26 |
| Canada CHR/Top 40 (Billboard) | 11 |
| Canada Hot AC (Billboard) | 13 |

== Release history ==
Release dates and formats for "Second Chance"
| Region | Date | Format | Label | Ref. |
|---|---|---|---|---|
| Canada | February 1, 2007 | Digital download | 604 | |
| United States | March 27, 2007 | Digital download | Universal Republic | |
