= Warner Music Canada =

Canadian division of Warner Music Group

- Logo used since 2020.
- Parent company: Warner Music Group
- Founded: 1967; 58 years ago
- Country of origin: Canada
- Location: Toronto, Ontario, Canada
- Official website: www.warnermusic.ca

Warner Music Canada is the Canadian division of Warner Music Group. The label previously operated as WEA Music of Canada, Ltd. (French: WEA Musique du Canada, Ltée), often shortened to WEA Canada, the Canadian subsidiary of WEA International, which later changed its name to Warner Music International in 1990. It was founded in 1967 as Warner Reprise Canada Ltd.

== Current artist roster ==
This list is for artists signed directly to Warner Music Canada.

- 54-40
- Big Wreck
- Billy Talent
- Blue Rodeo
- Buck 65
- Carys
- Corey Hart
- Corneille
- Courage My Love
- Die Mannequin
- Divine Brown
- Eleven Past One
- Lindsay Ell
- Great Big Sea
- Greg Keelor
- Hot Hot Heat
- Meaghan Smith
- Modern Space
- Myles Castello
- Scott Helman
- Spirit of the West
- Sarah Slean
- Philip Sayce
- The Abrams
- The Balconies
- The Cliks
- The Sheepdogs
- The Waking Eyes
- Tomi Swick

== Canadian artists on Warner Music Group affiliates ==
This list is for Canadian artists currently signed to other Warner Music Group affiliates based outside of Canada.

- Michael Bublé (Reprise Records, 143 Records)
- Glass Tiger (Halo Entertainment Group and Willow Music) (distributed by Warner)
- Scott Helman (Warner Music Canada)
- High Valley (Warner Music Nashville)
- k.d. lang (Nonesuch Records) (previously on Sire and Warner Bros.)
- Avril Lavigne (DTA Records), (Elektra Records)
- Robyn Ottolini (Warner Music Nashville)
- Daniel Powter (Warner Records)
- Rush (Roadrunner Records, previously on Atlantic) (new US or EU LPs imported into Canada under licence)
- Neil Young (Reprise Records)

== Canadian artists formerly signed to Warner Music Group ==
- Amanda Stott (Warner Music Canada)
- Barenaked Ladies (Reprise)
- Bif Naked (Lava/Atlantic [outside Canada]/Warner Music Canada)
- Leonard Cohen (Warner Bros.)
- Victoria Duffield (Warner Music Canada)
- Flashlight Brown (Hollywood [outside canada]/Union 2112)
- Matthew Good (Warner Music Canada)
- Gowan (Anthem/Atlantic) (outside Canada)
- Brett Kissel (Warner Music Canada)
- Honeymoon Suite (WEA)
- Hot Hot Heat (Sire)
- Gordon Lightfoot (Reprise/Warner Bros./Warner Music Canada)
- Lisa Lougheed (WEA)
- Alanis Morissette (Maverick/Reprise)
- Joni Mitchell (Asylum/Reprise)
- Moxy Fruvous (Warner Music Canada)
- Meghan Patrick (Warner Music Canada)
- Alannah Myles (Atlantic)
- One To One (Bonaire/WEA)
- Robbie Robertson (Warner Bros.)
- Lorraine Segato (WEA)
- Simple Plan (Atlantic Records)
- Tamia (Qwest/Warner Bros./Elektra)
- Tegan and Sara (Sire/Warner Records)
- The Tragically Hip (Sire) (US)
- The Washboard Union (Warner Music Canada)

== Affiliated labels ==
- 6ixBuzz Entertainment (2020–present)
