= When I'm with You (Faber Drive song) =

Single by Faber Drive

from the album Seven Second Surgery
- Released: January 2008
- Studio: Mountainview Studios (Abbotsford, British Columbia)
- Genre: Soft rock; emo pop
- Length: 3:41
- Label: 604; Universal Records
- Songwriters: Faber Drive; Brian Howes
- Producers: Howes; Joey Moi

Faber Drive singles chronology
"Tongue Tied" (2007)	"When I'm with You" (2008)	"Sleepless Nights (Never Let Her Go)" (2008)

Music video
- "When I'm with You" on YouTube

"When I'm with You" is a song by Canadian pop punk band Faber Drive. It was released as the third single from their debut studio album Seven Second Surgery. The song peaked at number 19 on the Canadian Hot 100 chart. The music video was filmed in a hospital and premiered on February 20, 2008, on MuchMusic's MuchOnDemand.

== Composition and lyrics ==
"When I'm With You" was written by members of Faber Drive and Brian Howes, while production was handled by Howes and Joey Moi. It was recorded at Mountainview Studios in Abbotsford, British Columbia. The song is about a couple in which the guy spends a long time away from his girlfriend and his promise to stay with her and spend more time with her.

On December 1, 2017, the group re-released an acoustic version of the song for digital download.

== Chart performance ==
The song debuted on the Canadian Hot 100 at number 88 on the week of February 2, 2008. It rose to the top 40 on the week of March 15, 2008, reaching number 27. It reached number 19 on the week of April 16, 2008 and left the chart four weeks later, spending a total of twenty weeks on the chart. On the Canada AC, Canada CHR/Top 40 and Canada Hot AC airplay charts, it reached numbers 22, 24 and 3, respectively.

As of February 2025, the song has garnered 14 million streams on Spotify.

== Music video ==
The music video for "When I'm With You" was premiered on February 20, 2008, via MuchOnDemand. It was directed by Colin Minihan. The video reached number six on Canada's MuchMusic Countdown on the week of May 22, 2008.

The music video describes a young woman who lost her boyfriend in a car accident. The video starts off with doctors rushing in with the patient who appears to be the injured boyfriend. A series of clips show the band singing and the desperate doctors trying multiple methods of saving the young man but failing. Meanwhile, the young woman tries to approach other people at the hospital, presumably to ask where her boyfriend is, but they don't respond. The video ends with her discovering her own body in the hospital and realizing that she is in fact the one who died. Shortly afterward, the young man's heartbeat flatlines, and doctors try to revive him but fail. The girlfriend takes his hand in her own and brings him back to life. The young woman walks outdoors into white light and into the afterlife.

== Personnel ==
Credits for "When I'm With You" retrieved from album's liner notes.

Faber Drive

- Dave Faber – lead vocals, guitar
- David Hinsley – lead guitar, backing vocals
- Jeremy Liddle – bass, backing vocals
- Ray Bull – drums, backing vocals

Production

- Brian Howes – producer
- Joey Moi – producer, mixing, engineer
- Scott Cooke – assistant engineer
- Ted Jensen – mastering

== Charts ==
=== Weekly charts ===
Weekly chart performance for "When I'm With You"
Chart (2008)	Peak position
Canada (Canadian Hot 100)	19
Canada AC (Billboard)	22
Canada CHR/Top 40 (Billboard)	24
Canada Hot AC (Billboard)	3

=== Year-end charts ===
Year-end chart performance for "When I'm With You"
Chart (2008)	Position
Canada (Canadian Hot 100)	83
Canada Hot AC (Billboard)	10

== Certification ==
Certifications for "When I'm With You"
Region	Certification	Certified units/sales
Canada (Music Canada)	Gold	20,000^{*}
^{*} Sales figures based on certification alone.
