= List of songs recorded by Carly Rae Jepsen =

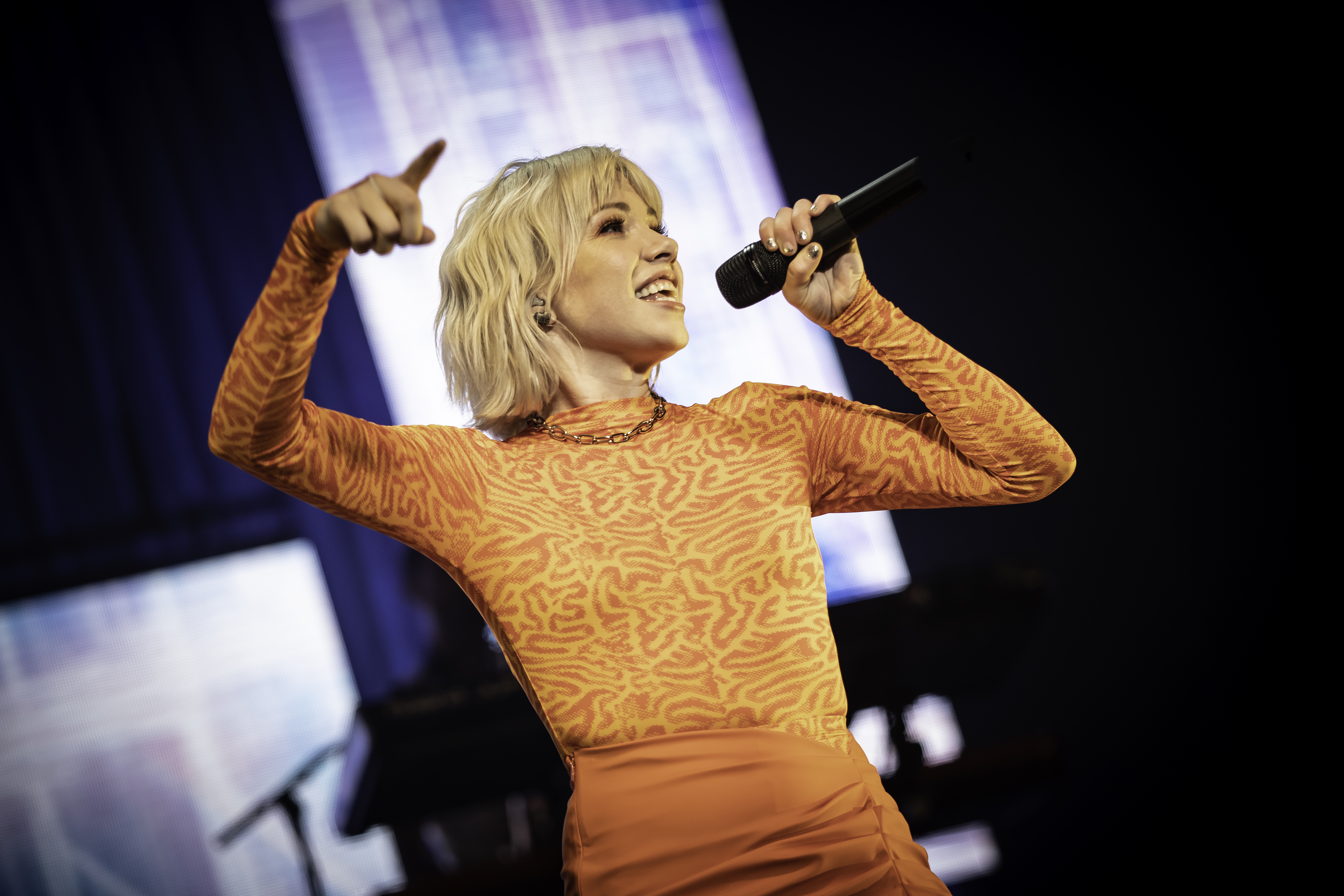
Jepsen performing in 2019

Canadian singer and songwriter Carly Rae Jepsen started her discography with her demo promotional EP Dear You followed by Tug of War, her debut album, which was released in September 2008, four years later. The album spawned two Canadian Hot 100 top 40 singles, "Tug of War" and "Bucket", both of which were accredited gold certifications by Music Canada (MC). Her second album, Kiss, was released in September 2012. "Call Me Maybe", the lead single from Kiss and her 2012 EP Curiosity, attained international success, reaching number one in Canada, Australia, the United Kingdom and the United States, among others. Curiosity went on to peak at number six on the Canadian Albums Chart. Its title track was released as its second single, peaking at number 18 in Canada. The same year, she collaborated with American artist Owl City on the single "Good Time". The song topped the charts in Canada and New Zealand and reached the top ten in several other countries, including Australia, Ireland, United Kingdom and the United States.

Jepsen's third album, Emotion, was released in 2015 and is influenced by songs from the 1980s. Its lead single "I Really Like You", peaked at number 14 in Canada and attained top five and top 40 positions in the UK and US, respectively. The second single, "Run Away with Me", was released in July. Jepsen has had nine singles chart within the Top 50 of the Canadian Hot 100, two of which reached number one. After the success of Emotion, she released a remix album based on the album, entitled Emotion Remixed +, and a compilation of 8 tracks that did not make it onto her third studio album, entitled Emotion: Side B.

In 2019, Jepsen released her fourth album, Dedicated. The album was preceded by the release of the singles "Party for One", "Now That I Found You", "No Drug Like Me", "Julien," and "Too Much". The album peaked at number 16 on the Canadian albums chart, and at number 18 on the US Billboard 200. A year later, Dedicated Side B was released as Jepsen's fifth album. The album serves as a companion album to Dedicated (2019). The album features songs that did not make the cut for the original album.

Jepsen released her sixth album, The Loneliest Time, in 2022. The album was preceded by the release of its lead single, "Western Wind", which was followed by "Beach House", "Talking to Yourself", and its title track, "The Loneliest Time". Serving as a companion piece, The Loveliest Time was released as Jepsen's seventh album in 2023, including the previously released single "Shy Boy".

== Released songs ==
Key
†	Indicates single release
#	Indicates promotional single release
‡	Indicates song included on an alternative version of the album

Title	Artist(s)	Writer(s)	Album	Year	Ref.
"Aeroplanes"	Carly Rae Jepsen	Carly Rae Jepsen; Patrik Berger	The Loveliest Time	2023	
"After All" †	Carly Rae Jepsen	Carly Rae Jepsen; Kyle Shearer; Nate Cyphert	Day and Night	2026	
"After Last Night"	Carly Rae Jepsen	Carly Rae Jepsen; Noonie Bao; Rostam Batmanglij	The Loveliest Time	2023	
"All I Need Is an Angel"	Carly Rae Jepsen	Tom Kitt; Brian Yorkey	Grease: Live!	2016	
"All That" #	Carly Rae Jepsen	Carly Rae Jepsen; Ariel Rechtshaid; Devonté Hynes	Emotion	2015	
"Almost Said It" #	Carly Rae Jepsen	Carly Rae Jepsen	Kiss ‡	2012	
"Always on My Mind"	Carly Rae Jepsen	Carly Rae Jepsen; Christopher J Baran; Ben Romans	Dedicated Side B ‡	2020	
"Anxious"	Carly Rae Jepsen	Carly Rae Jepsen; Oliver Lundström; Tavish Crowe	The Loneliest Time ‡	2022	
"Anything to Be with You"	Carly Rae Jepsen	Carly Rae Jepsen; Jared Maneira; Noonie Bao; Patrik Berger; Tavish Crowe	The Loveliest Time	2023	
"Automatically in Love"	Carly Rae Jepsen	Carly Rae Jepsen; John Hill; Rogét Chahayed; Nate Campany	Dedicated	2019	
"Backseat"	Charli XCX featuring Carly Rae Jepsen	Charlotte Aitchison; Alexander Guy Cook; Finn "EasyFun" Keane; Carly Rae Jepsen	Pop 2	2017	
"Bad Thing Twice"	Carly Rae Jepsen	Carly Rae Jepsen; Jay Stolar; John Hill; Jordan Palmer	The Loneliest Time	2022	
"Beach House" †	Carly Rae Jepsen	Carly Rae Jepsen; Alex Hope; Nate Cyphert	The Loneliest Time	2022	
"Beautiful"	Carly Rae Jepsen featuring Justin Bieber	Toby Gad; Justin Bieber; Alex Lambert	Kiss	2012	
"Bends"	Carly Rae Jepsen	Carly Rae Jepsen; Nathan Jenkins; Tavish Crowe	The Loneliest Time	2022	
"Better Than Me"	Blood Orange featuring Carly Rae Jepsen	Devonté Hynes	Freetown Sound	2016	
"Black Heart"	Carly Rae Jepsen	Carly Rae Jepsen; Greg Wells; E. Kidd Bogart	Emotion ‡	2015	
"Body Language"	Carly Rae Jepsen	Carly Rae Jepsen; Tom Barnes; Ben Kohn; Pete Kelleher; Devonté Hynes; Tavish Crowe	Emotion: Side B	2016	
"Both Sides Now"	Carly Rae Jepsen	Roberta Mitchel	Curiosity	2012	
"Boy Problems"	Carly Rae Jepsen	Carly Rae Jepsen; Sia Furler; Greg Kurstin; Tavish Crowe	Emotion	2015	
"Bucket" †	Carly Rae Jepsen	Carly Rae Jepsen	Tug of War	2008	
"Call Me Maybe" †	Carly Rae Jepsen	Carly Rae Jepsen; Josh Ramsay; John McPhillips; Tavish Crowe	Curiosity	2012	
"Call Me Maybe" †	Carly Rae Jepsen	Carly Rae Jepsen; Josh Ramsay; John McPhillips; Tavish Crowe	Kiss	2012	
"Change for You"	The Midway State featuring Carly Rae Jepsen	Nathan Ferraro; Daenen Bramberger; Mike Wise; Mike Kirsh	Holes	2008	
"Comeback"	Carly Rae Jepsen	Carly Rae Jepsen; Jack Antonoff; Jared Manierka	Dedicated Side B	2020	
"Come Over"	Carly Rae Jepsen	Carly Rae Jepsen; John Hill; Jordan Palmer; Nate Campany	The Loveliest Time	2023	
"Cry"	Carly Rae Jepsen	Carly Rae Jepsen; Nick Ruth; Tavish Crowe	Emotion: Side B	2016	
"Curiosity" †	Carly Rae Jepsen	Carly Rae Jepsen; Ryan Stewart	Curiosity	2012	
"Curiosity" †	Carly Rae Jepsen	Carly Rae Jepsen; Ryan Stewart	Kiss	2012	
"Cut to the Feeling" †	Carly Rae Jepsen	Carly Rae Jepsen; Simon Wilcox; Nolan Lambroza	Emotion: Side B	2017	
"Dear You"	Carly Rae Jepsen	Carly Rae Jepsen	Dear You	2004	
"Disco Darling" #	Carly Rae Jepsen	Carly Rae Jepsen; Tavish Crowe; Mike Wise	Non-album single	2026	
"Don't Leave Me on the Dance Floor" †	Carly Rae Jepsen	Carly Rae Jepsen; Christopher Baran; Arthur Besnainou	Day and Night	2026	
"Drive"	Carly Rae Jepsen	Carly Rae Jepsen; Dallas Austin; Michael McGarity; Jaden Michaels; Tavish Crowe	Kiss ‡	2012	
"Emotion" #	Carly Rae Jepsen	Carly Rae Jepsen; Nate Campany; Ben Romans; Christopher Baran	Emotion	2015	
"Everything He Needs"	Carly Rae Jepsen	Carly Rae Jepsen; Harry Nilsson; Christopher J. Baran; Ben Romans; Amanda "MNDR" Warner	Dedicated	2019	
"Everywhere You Look (The Fuller House Theme)" #	Carly Rae Jepsen	Jesse Frederick; Bennett Salvay	Non-album single	2016	
"Fake Mona Lisa"	Carly Rae Jepsen	Carly Rae Jepsen; Anton Rundberg; Julia Karlsson; Tavish Crowe	Dedicated Side B	2020	
"Far Away"	Carly Rae Jepsen	Carly Rae Jepsen; Nathan Jenkins; Tavish Crowe	The Loneliest Time	2022	
"Favourite Colour"	Carly Rae Jepsen	Carly Rae Jepsen; Mattias Larsson; Robin Fredriksson; Tavish Crowe	Emotion ‡	2015	
"Feels Right"	Carly Rae Jepsen featuring Electric Guest	Carly Rae Jepsen; Asa Taccone; John Hill; Jordan Palmer; Matthew Compton	Dedicated	2019	
"Felt This Way"	Carly Rae Jepsen	Carly Rae Jepsen; Jakob Hazell; John Hill; Jordan Palmer; Svante Halldin; Tavish Crowe	Dedicated Side B	2020	
"Fever"	Carly Rae Jepsen	Carly Rae Jepsen; Kyle Shearer; Nate Campany; Saul Vasquez	Emotion Remixed +	2016	
"Fever"	Carly Rae Jepsen	Carly Rae Jepsen; Kyle Shearer; Nate Campany; Saul Vasquez	Emotion: Side B	2016	
"First Time" #	Carly Rae Jepsen	Carly Rae Jepsen; Rami Yacoub; Carl Falk; Wayne Hector	Emotion Remixed +	2016	
"First Time" #	Carly Rae Jepsen	Carly Rae Jepsen; Rami Yacoub; Carl Falk; Wayne Hector	Emotion: Side B	2016	
"For Sure"	Carly Rae Jepsen	Carly Rae Jepsen; Patrik Berger; Noonie Bao; Pontus Winnberg	Dedicated	2019	
"Gimmie Love"	Carly Rae Jepsen	Carly Rae Jepsen; Mattias Larsson; Robin Fredriksson	Emotion	2015	
"Go Find Yourself or Whatever"	Carly Rae Jepsen	Carly Rae Jepsen; Rostam Batmanglij	The Loneliest Time	2022	
"Good Time" †	Carly Rae Jepsen and Owl City	Adam Young; Matthew Thiessen; Brian Lee	The Midsummer Station	2012	
"Good Time" †	Carly Rae Jepsen and Owl City	Adam Young; Matthew Thiessen; Brian Lee	Kiss	2012	
"Guitar String / Wedding Ring"	Carly Rae Jepsen	Carly Rae Jepsen; Josh Ramsay; Tavish Crowe	Kiss	2012	
"Happy Not Knowing"	Carly Rae Jepsen	Carly Rae Jepsen; Tavish Crowe; John Hill; Jordan Palmer; Daniel Ledinsky	Dedicated	2019	
"Hate That You Know Me"	Bleachers	Jack Antonoff; Julia Michaels	Gone Now	2017	
"Heartbeat"	Carly Rae Jepsen	Carly Rae Jepsen; Ariel Rechtshaid; Asia Whiteacre; Noah Beresin	Dedicated Side B	2020	
"Heavy Lifting"	Carly Rae Jepsen	Carly Rae Jepsen	Tug of War	2008	
"Higher"	Carly Rae Jepsen	Greg Kurstin; Claude Kelly	Emotion: Side B	2016	
"Hotel Shampoos"	Carly Rae Jepsen	Carly Rae Jepsen	Tug of War	2008	
"Hurt So Good"	Carly Rae Jepsen	Carly Rae Jepsen; Matthew Koma	Kiss	2012	
"I Didn't Just Come Here to Dance"	Carly Rae Jepsen	Carly Rae Jepsen; Tino Zolfo; Joe Cruz; Lukas Loules; Wouter Janssen	Emotion ‡	2015	
"I Know You Have a Girlfriend"	Carly Rae Jepsen	Carly Rae Jepsen; Matthew Koma	Kiss ‡	2012	
"I Really Like You" †	Carly Rae Jepsen	Carly Rae Jepsen; Jacob Kasher Hindlin; Peter Svensson	Emotion	2015	
"I Still Wonder" (Acoustic)	Carly Rae Jepsen	Carly Rae Jepsen	Tug of War ‡	2008	
"I'll Be Your Girl"	Carly Rae Jepsen	Carly Rae Jepsen; John Hill; Patrik Berger	Dedicated	2019	
"In My Bedroom"	Carly Rae Jepsen	Carly Rae Jepsen	Dear You	2004	
"It Takes Two" †	Carly Rae Jepsen; Mike Will Made It; Lil Yachty	James Brown; Robert Ginyard Jr.	Non-album single	2017	
"Joshua Tree"	Carly Rae Jepsen	Carly Rae Jepsen; Luke Niccoli; Tavish Crowe	The Loneliest Time	2022	
"Julien" #	Carly Rae Jepsen	Carly Rae Jepsen; Kyle Shearer; Nate Cyphert; Benjamin Ruttner; Jared Manierka	Dedicated	2019	
"Just a Step Away"	Carly Rae Jepsen	Carly Rae Jepsen; Larry Jepsen; Ryan Stewart	Curiosity	2012	
"Kamikaze"	Carly Rae Jepsen	Carly Rae Jepsen; Jakob Hazell; Svante Halldin	The Loveliest Time	2023	
"Keep Away"	Carly Rae Jepsen	Carly Rae Jepsen; Kyle Shearer; Nate Cyphert	The Loneliest Time ‡	2022	
"Kollage"	Carly Rae Jepsen	Carly Rae Jepsen; Patrik Berger	The Loveliest Time	2023	
"L.A. Hallucinations"	Carly Rae Jepsen	Carly Rae Jepsen; Zachary Gray; Ajay Bhattacharyya	Emotion	2015	
"Last Christmas" †	Carly Rae Jepsen	George Michael	Non-album single	2015	
"Let It Snow"	Carly Rae Jepsen	Sammy Cahn; Jule Styne	The Second Noel	2011	
"Let's Be Friends"	Carly Rae Jepsen	Carly Rae Jepsen; Christopher J Baran; Ben Romans	Dedicated Side B ‡	2020	
"Let's Get Lost"	Carly Rae Jepsen	Carly Rae Jepsen; Ben Romans; Christopher J Baran	Emotion	2015	
"Let's Sort the Whole Thing Out"	Carly Rae Jepsen	Carly Rae Jepsen; Markus Krunegård; Patrik Berger; Pontus Winnberg	Dedicated Side B	2020	
"The Loneliest Time" †	Carly Rae Jepsen featuring Rufus Wainwright	Carly Rae Jepsen; Kyle Shearer; Nate Cyphert	The Loneliest Time	2022	
"Love Again"	Carly Rae Jepsen	Carly Rae Jepsen; Nate Campany; Christopher J Baran; Tavish Crowe	Emotion ‡	2015	
"Love Me Like That"	The Knocks featuring Carly Rae Jepsen	Ben Ruttner; James Patterson; Carly Rae Jepsen; Ross Clark; Christopher Caswell; Hannah Robinson; Martina Sorbara; Richard Philips	55	2016	
"Making the Most of the Night" #	Carly Rae Jepsen	Carly Rae Jepsen; Sia Furler; Samuel Dixon; Emre Ramazanoglu; The Trinity	Emotion	2015	
"Melt with You"	Carly Rae Jepsen	Carly Rae Jepsen; Matthew Koma	Kiss ‡	2012	
"Mittens"	Carly Rae Jepsen	Carly Rae Jepsen	The Second Noel	2011	
"Money and the Ego"	Carly Rae Jepsen	Carly Rae Jepsen	Tug of War	2008	
"More than a Memory"	Carly Rae Jepsen	Carly Rae Jepsen; Matthew Koma; Stefan Gordy	Kiss	2012	
"Motivation" †	Carly Rae Jepsen	Carly Rae Jepsen; Cole M.G.N	Day and Night	2026	
"Move Me"	Lewis OfMan and Carly Rae Jepsen	Lewis OfMan; Carly Rae Jepsen	Non-album single	2022	
"Never Get to Hold You"	Carly Rae Jepsen	Carly Rae Jepsen; Nate Campany; Kyle Shearer; Tavish Crowe	Emotion ‡	2015	
"No Drug Like Me" †	Carly Rae Jepsen	Carly Rae Jepsen; Daniel Ledinski; James Flannigan; John Hill; Jordan Palmer	Dedicated	2019	
"No Thinking Over the Weekend"	Carly Rae Jepsen	Carly Rae Jepsen; Noonie Bao; Patrik Berger	The Loneliest Time ‡	2022	
"Now I Don't Hate California After All"	Carly Rae Jepsen	Carly Rae Jepsen; Noonie Bao; Markus Krunegård; Patrik Berger; Pontus Winnberg	Dedicated Side B	2020	
"Now That I Found You" †	Carly Rae Jepsen	Alexander O'Neill; Ben Berger; Carly Rae Jepsen; Ryan McMahon; Ryan Rabin	Dedicated	2019	
"The One"	Carly Rae Jepsen	Carly Rae Jepsen; Kyle Shearer; Nate Campany	Emotion: Side B	2016	
"On Wires" †	Carly Rae Jepsen	Carly Rae Jepsen; Nate Cyphert; Kyle Shearer	Day and Night	2026	
"Part of Your World" #	Carly Rae Jepsen	Alan Menken; Howard Ashman	The Little Mermaid Greatest Hits	2013	
"Party for One" †	Carly Rae Jepsen	Carly Rae Jepsen; Tavish Crowe; Julia Karlsson; Anton Rundberg	Dedicated	2018	
"Picture"	Carly Rae Jepsen	Carly Rae Jepsen; Josh Ramsay; John McPhillips; Tavish Crowe	Curiosity	2012	
"Picture"	Carly Rae Jepsen	Carly Rae Jepsen; Josh Ramsay; John McPhillips; Tavish Crowe	Kiss ‡	2012	
"Psychedelic Switch"	Carly Rae Jepsen	Carly Rae Jepsen; Kyle Shearer; Nate Cyphert	The Loveliest Time	2023	
"Put It to Rest"	Carly Rae Jepsen	Carly Rae Jepsen; Noonie Bao; Patrik Berger	The Loveliest Time	2023	
"Real Love"	Carly Rae Jepsen	Carly Rae Jepsen; James Flannigan; Chris Whitehall	Dedicated	2019	
"Rest from the Streets"	A Friend in London featuring Carly Rae Jepsen	Páll Schou; Aske Damm Bramming; Esben Svane; Sebastian Vinther Olsen	Unite	2013	
"Right Words Wrong Time"	Carly Rae Jepsen	Carly Rae Jepsen; Alex Hope; Rogét Chahayed	Dedicated	2019	
"Roses"	Carly Rae Jepsen	Carly Rae Jepsen; Ryan Stewart	Emotion: Side B	2016	
"Run Away with Me" †	Carly Rae Jepsen	Carly Rae Jepsen; Mattias Larsson; Robin Fredriksson; Karl Schuster; Oscar Holter; Jonnali Parmenius	Emotion	2015	
"Shadow"	Carly Rae Jepsen	Carly Rae Jepsen; Rostam Batmanglij	The Loveliest Time	2023	
"Shadow"	Bleachers featuring Carly Rae Jepsen	Emile Haynie; Jack Antonoff; John Hill	Terrible Thrills, Vol. 2	2015	
"Shooting Star"	Carly Rae Jepsen	Carly Rae Jepsen; Danny Silberstein; Jared Solomon	The Loneliest Time	2022	
"Shy Boy" †	Carly Rae Jepsen	Carly Rae Jepsen; Ethan Gruska; Kyle Shearer; Nate Campany; Ben Romans; Bo Watson; June Watson Williams	The Loveliest Time	2023	
"Sideways"	Carly Rae Jepsen	Carly Rae Jepsen; Jay Stolar; John Hill; Jordan Palmer	The Loneliest Time	2022	
"Solo"	Carly Rae Jepsen	Carly Rae Jepsen; Nate Campany; James Flannigan	Dedicated Side B	2020	
"So Nice"	Carly Rae Jepsen	Carly Rae Jepsen; Kyle Shearer; Nate Cyphert	The Loneliest Time	2022	
"So Right"	Carly Rae Jepsen	Carly Rae Jepsen; Cole Marsden; Grief Neill; Nate Cyphert	The Loveliest Time	2023	
"The Sound"	Carly Rae Jepsen	Carly Rae Jepsen; Tommy English; Noah Beresin; Jared Manierka	Dedicated	2019	
"Sour Candy" †	Carly Rae Jepsen	Carly Rae Jepsen; Josh Ramsay	Tug of War	2008	
"Stadium Love"	Carly Rae Jepsen	Carly Rae Jepsen; Lewis OfMan	The Loveliest Time	2023	
"Stay Away"	Carly Rae Jepsen	Carly Rae Jepsen; Jakob Hazell; Svante Halldin; Tavish Crowe	Dedicated Side B	2020	
"Store"	Carly Rae Jepsen	Carly Rae Jepsen; Nate Campany; Ben Romans; Christopher Baran	Emotion: Side B	2016	
"Summer Love"	Carly Rae Jepsen	Carly Rae Jepsen; Daniel Ledinsky; Dave Palmer; John Hill; Patrik Berger	Dedicated Side B	2020	
"Sunshine on My Shoulders" †	Carly Rae Jepsen	John Denver; Dick Kniss; Mike Taylor	Tug of War	2008	
"Super Natural" †	Danny L Harle featuring Carly Rae Jepsen	Danny L Harle; Nate Campany	PC Music, Vol. 2	2016	
"Surrender My Heart"	Carly Rae Jepsen	Carly Rae Jepsen; Imad Royal; Max Hershenow	The Loneliest Time	2022	
"Sweet Talker"	Carly Rae Jepsen	Carly Rae Jepsen	Tug of War	2008	
"Sweetie"	Carly Rae Jepsen	Carly Rae Jepsen; Klas Åhlund; Jack Antonoff; Sara Quin	Kiss ‡	2012	
"Take a Picture" †	Carly Rae Jepsen	Carly Rae Jepsen; Edmund Thomas Dunne; Andrew Lawrence Bloch	Non-album single	2013	
"Talk to Me"	Carly Rae Jepsen	Carly Rae Jepsen; Ryan Stewart	Curiosity	2012	
"Talking to Yourself" †	Carly Rae Jepsen	Carly Rae Jepsen; Benjamin Berger; Ryan Rabin; Simon Wilcox	The Loneliest Time	2022	
"Tell Me"	Carly Rae Jepsen	Carly Rae Jepsen	Tug of War	2008	
"This Kiss" †	Carly Rae Jepsen	Carly Rae Jepsen; Matthew Koma; Kelly Covell; Stefan Kendal Gordy	Kiss	2012	
"This Is What They Say"	Carly Rae Jepsen	Carly Rae Jepsen; Sean Douglas; Devonté Hynes; Tavish Crowe; Warren Okay Felder	Dedicated Side B	2020	
"This Love Isn't Crazy"	Carly Rae Jepsen	Carly Rae Jepsen; Jack Antonoff	Dedicated Side B	2020	
"Tiny Little Bows"	Carly Rae Jepsen	Carly Rae Jepsen; Dallas Austin; Tavish Crowe; Sam Cooke	Kiss	2012	
"To Be Without You"	Carly Rae Jepsen	Carly Rae Jepsen	Dear You	2004	
"Tonight I'm Getting Over You" †	Carly Rae Jepsen	Carly Rae Jepsen; Peter Luts; Lukas Loules; Max Martin; Clarence Coffee Jr. Shiloh; Katerina Loules	Kiss	2012	
"Too Much" †	Carly Rae Jepsen	Carly Rae Jepsen; John Hill; Noonie Bao; Jordan Palmer	Dedicated	2019	
"Tug of War" †	Carly Rae Jepsen	Carly Rae Jepsen	Tug of War	2008	
"Turn Me Up"	Carly Rae Jepsen	Carly Rae Jepsen; Bonnie McKee; Josh Abraham; Oliver Goldstein; Kevin Maher	Kiss	2012	
"Want You in My Room"	Carly Rae Jepsen	Carly Rae Jepsen; Jack Antonoff; Tavish Crowe	Dedicated	2019	
"Warm Blood" #	Carly Rae Jepsen	Carly Rae Jepsen; Rostam Batmanglij; Tino Zolfo; Joe Cruz	Emotion	2015	
"Weekend Love"	Carly Rae Jepsen	Carly Rae Jepsen; Ethan Gruska	The Loveliest Time	2023	
"Western Wind" †	Carly Rae Jepsen	Carly Rae Jepsen; Rostam Batmanglij	The Loneliest Time	2022	
"When I Needed You"	Carly Rae Jepsen	Carly Rae Jepsen; Ariel Rechtshaid; Daniel Nigro; Nate Campany; Tavish Crowe	Emotion	2015	
"Window"	Carly Rae Jepsen	Carly Rae Jepsen; Theo Katzman; Tyler Andrew Duncan	Dedicated Side B	2020	
"Where Did We Go?" †	Andrew Allen featuring Carly Rae Jepsen	Andrew Allen; Carly Rae Jepsen; Ryan Stewart	Non-album single	2012	
"Worldly Matters"	Carly Rae Jepsen	Carly Rae Jepsen	Tug of War	2008	
"Wrong Feels So Right"	Carly Rae Jepsen	Carly Rae Jepsen; David Listenbee; Francesca Richard; Jordan Orvosh; Stefan Gordy; Andre Smith; Tavish Crowe	Kiss ‡	2012	
"Your Heart Is a Muscle"	Carly Rae Jepsen	Carly Rae Jepsen; Toby Gad	Kiss	2012	
"Your Type" †	Carly Rae Jepsen	Carly Rae Jepsen; Rami Yacoub; Carl Falk; Wayne Hector; Tavish Crowe	Emotion	2015	

== Unreleased songs ==
Title	Artist(s)	Writer(s)	Ref.
"Affect Your Body"	—N/a	Thomas Dutton; Alex Hope; Carly Rae Jepsen	
"After the Bell"	—N/a	Tavish Crowe; Carly Rae Jepsen; Josh Ramsay	
"Alice in Wonderland"	Carly Rae Jepsen	Carly Rae Jepsen	
"Angels"	Carly Rae Jepsen	Stuart Hobson; Carly Rae Jepsen; Ryan Stewart	
"Back of My Heart"	—N/a	Chris Braide; Carly Rae Jepsen; Ali Tamposi	
"Because We're Young"	—N/a	Carly Rae Jepsen; Mårten Tromm	
"Black Light"	—N/a	Toby Gad; Carly Rae Jepsen; Samantha Ronson	
"Body Talk"	Carly Rae Jepsen	Toby Gad	
"Bold Type"	—N/a	James Flannigan; Carly Rae Jepsen; Christopher Whitehall	
"Christmas Ornament"	—N/a	Carly Rae Jepsen; Ryan Stewart	
"Dark Blue"	—N/a	Lauren Christy; Carly Rae Jepsen; Andre Lidell	
"Dear Julien"	Carly Rae Jepsen	Carly Rae Jepsen; Kevin James Maher	
"Don't Leave Me on the Dancefloor"	—N/a	Liliana Barańska; Arthur Besnainou; Carly Rae Jepsen	
"Euphoria"	—N/a	Gino Barletta; Jonas Jeberg; Carly Rae Jepsen	
"Europe"	Carly Rae Jepsen	Carly Rae Jepsen	
"Falling for You"	—N/a	Joe Cruz; Carly Rae Jepsen; Tino Zolfo	
"Happy All the Time"	—N/a	Nate Campany; Danny L Harle; Carly Rae Jepsen; Kyle Shearer	
"Hey Boy"	Carly Rae Jepsen	Toby Gad; Carly Rae Jepsen	
"I Admit That There Was Music"	—N/a	Lauren Christy; Carly Rae Jepsen; Chad Kroeger; Andre Lidell	
"I Believe You"	—N/a	Barry Dean; Thomas Hull; Carly Rae Jepsen	
"It's Like This"	—N/a	Natalie Hemby; Thomas Hull; Carly Rae Jepsen	
"Katie's Kicking In the Corner"	Carly Rae Jepsen	Carly Rae Jepsen	
"Lost and Found"	Carly Rae Jepsen	Carly Rae Jepsen; Ryan Stewart	
"Love Amore"	—N/a	Sam Hollander; Carly Rae Jepsen; Rick Nowels	
"Luck in Love"	—N/a	Sam Hollander; Carly Rae Jepsen; Steve Robson	
"Moonrock"	Carly Rae Jepsen	Ryan Dahle; Carly Rae Jepsen	
"Not the Only One"	—N/a	Toby Gad; Carly Rae Jepsen	
"On the Weekend"	—N/a	Chloe Angelides; Gino Barletta; Jonas Jeberg; Carly Rae Jepsen	
"Play It on Repeat"	—N/a	Michael James; Carly Rae Jepsen; Davor Vulama	
"Runaways"	Carly Rae Jepsen	Carly Rae Jepsen; Dana Parish; Andrew Hollander	
"Running Through My Head"	—N/a	Jenna Andrews; Carly Rae Jepsen; William Wiik Larsen	
"The Martyr"	—N/a	Tavish Crowe; Carly Rae Jepsen; Josh Ramsay	
"Small Town In Me"	—N/a	Johnathan Hetherington; Carly Rae Jepsen; Troy Samson	
"Smoke and Cinnamon"	Carly Rae Jepsen	Natalie Findlay; Cole M.G.N. Carly Rae Jepsen; Jules Apollinaire	
"Sun on You"	—N/a	Toby Gad; Carly Rae Jepsen	
"Sweater Weather"	Carly Rae Jepsen	Ethan Gruska; Carly Rae Jepsen	
"The Middle"	Zedd, Grey, and Carly Rae Jepsen	Jordan K. Johnson; Marcus Lomax; Stefan Johnson; Sarah Aarons; Kyle Trewartha; Michael Trewartha; Anton Zaslavski	
"There Was Music"	—N/a	David Hodges; Carly Rae Jepsen; Chad Kroeger	
"We Get By"	Carly Rae Jepsen	Nate Campany; John Hill; Carly Rae Jepsen; Kyle Shearer	
"You Were My Party"	—N/a	Patrik Berger; Carly Rae Jepsen; Carli Loove; Jannali Parmenius	
