= List of awards and nominations received by Carly Rae Jepsen =

Carly Rae Jepsen awards and nominations
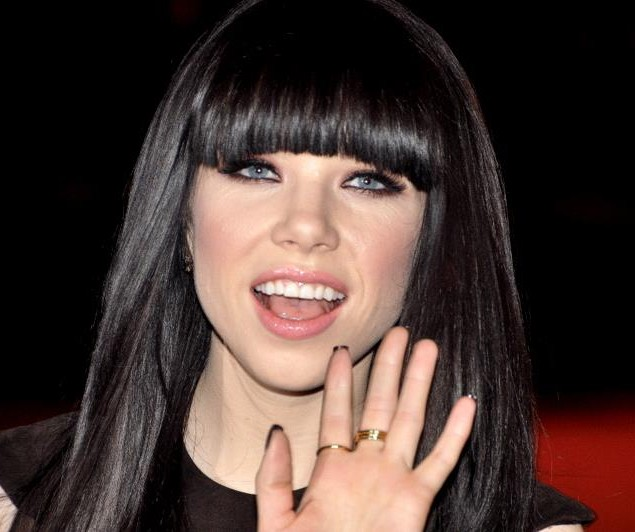
- Jepsen in Cannes, France, at the 2013 NRJ Music Awards
Awards and nominations
Award	Wins	Nominations
American Music Awards	1	1
Billboard Japan Music Awards	2	2
Billboard Music Award	4	9
Canada's Walk of Fame	1	1
Canadian Radio Music Awards	1	1
Grammy Awards	0	2
Juno Awards	3	6
Much Music Video Awards	3	7
MTV Europe Music Awards	2	4
MTV Video Music Awards	0	2
MTV Movie & TV Awards	1	1
MTV Video Music Awards Japan	1	2
Nickelodeon Kids' Choice Awards	0	1
NRJ Music Awards	1	1
People's Choice Awards	0	3
Polaris Music Prize	0	2
Teen Choice Awards	2	3
Western Canadian Music Awards	1	1

Totals (Note: Certain award groups do not simply award one winner. They acknowledge several different recipients, have runners-up, and have third place. Since this is a specific recognition and is different from losing an award, runner-up mentions are considered wins in this award tally. For simplification and to avoid errors, each award in this list has been presumed to have had a prior nomination.)
- Wins: 31
- Nominations: 86

Canadian singer and songwriter Carly Rae Jepsen has received 29 awards from 71 nominations, including an American Music Award, four Billboard Music Awards, three Juno Awards, three Much Music Video Awards and two Teen Choice Awards.

In 2007, Jepsen placed third in Canadian Idol season five's competition. Before signing with Interscope, in 2008 she independently released her debut album, Tug of War, which its eponymous lead single won the award for Song of the Year at the 2010 Canadian Radio Music Awards. Her second album, title Kiss (2012), won two awards at the 2013 Juno Awards, winning the Album of the Year. The first single, "Call Me Maybe", was nominated for two Grammy Awards and won several other accolades, including the Billboard Music Award, MuchMusic Video Award and MTV Europe Music Award. Jepsen's collaboration with Owl City, "Good Time", won two Billboard Japan Music Awards.

== American Music Awards ==
Year	Category	Recipient	Result	Ref.
2012	New Artist of the Year	Carly Rae Jepsen	Won	

== Billboard Awards ==
=== Billboard Music Awards ===
Year	Category	Nominated work / recipient	Result	Ref.
2013	Top Pop Song of the Year	"Call Me Maybe"	Won	
2013	Top Digital Song	"Call Me Maybe"	Won	
2013	Hot 100 Song	"Call Me Maybe"	Nominated	
2013	Top Radio Song	"Call Me Maybe"	Nominated	
2013	Top Streaming Song	"Call Me Maybe"	Nominated	
2013	Top New Artist	Carly Rae Jepsen	Nominated	
2013	Top Female Artist	Carly Rae Jepsen	Nominated	
2013	Top Digital Songs Artist	Carly Rae Jepsen	Nominated	

=== Billboard Japan Music Awards ===
Year	Category	Nominated work	Result	Ref.
2012	Hot Top Airplay of the Year	"Good Time"	Won	
2012	Digital & Airplay Overseas of the Year	"Good Time"	Won	
2015	Hot Overseas of the Year	"I Really Like You"	Won	
2015	Hot 100 of the Year	"I Really Like You"	Nominated	
2015	Radio Song of the Year	"I Really Like You"	Nominated	

=== Billboard Women in Music Awards ===
Year	Category	Recipient	Result	Ref.
2012	Rising Star	Carly Rae Jepsen	Won	

== BreakTudo Awards ==
Year	Category	Recipient	Result	Ref.
2019	Album of the Year	Dedicated	Nominated	

== Canada's Walk of Fame ==
Year	Category	Recipient	Result	Ref.
2013	Slaight Allan Awards	Carly Rae Jepsen	Won	

== Canadian Radio Music Awards ==
Year	Category	Nominated work	Result	Ref.
2010	Song of the Year	"Tug of War"	Won	

== Grammy Awards ==
Year	Category	Nominated work	Result	Ref.
2013	Song of the Year	"Call Me Maybe"	Nominated	
2013	Best Pop Solo Performance	"Call Me Maybe"	Nominated	

== Juno Awards ==
Year	Category	Nominated work / recipient	Result	Ref.
2010	Breakthrough Artist of the Year	Carly Rae Jepsen	Nominated	
2010	Songwriter of the Year	Carly Rae Jepsen ("Tug of War", "Bucket", "Money and the Ego")	Nominated	
2013	Single of the Year	"Call Me Maybe"	Won	
2013	Album of the Year	Kiss	Won	
2013	Pop Album of the Year	Kiss	Won	
2013	Artist of the Year	Carly Rae Jepsen	Nominated	
2013	Fan Choice Award	Carly Rae Jepsen	Nominated	
2016	Fan Choice Award	Carly Rae Jepsen	Nominated	
2023	Pop Album of the Year	The Loneliest Time	Nominated	

== Los Premios 40 Principales ==
Year	Category	Nominated work / recipient	Result	Ref.
2012	Best International Song	"Call Me Maybe"	Nominated	
2012	Best International New Artist	Carly Rae Jepsen	Nominated	

== Los Premios 40 Principales América ==
Year	Category	Nominated work / recipient	Result	Ref.
2012	Best International Song	"Call Me Maybe"	Won	
2012	Best International New Artist	Carly Rae Jepsen	Nominated	

== MuchMusic Video Awards ==
Year	Category	Nominated work / recipient	Result	Ref.
2010	UR Fave: New Artist	"Bucket"	Nominated	
2012	UR Fave Artist	Carly Rae Jepsen	Nominated	
2012	MuchMusic.com Most Streamed Video of the Year	"Call Me Maybe"	Won	
2012	Video of the Year	"Call Me Maybe"	Won	
2012	UR Fave Video	"Call Me Maybe"	Won	
2013	International Video of the Year by a Canadian	"This Kiss"	Nominated	
2013	Your Fave Artist/Group	Carly Rae Jepsen	Nominated	
2015	Fan Fave Artist or Group	Carly Rae Jepsen	Nominated	

== MTV Awards ==
=== MTV Video Music Awards ===
.

Year	Category	Nominated work / recipient	Result	Ref.
2012	Best New Artist	"Call Me Maybe" / Carly Rae Jepsen	Nominated	
2012	Most Share-Worthy Video	"Call Me Maybe"	Nominated	

=== MTV Movie & TV Awards ===
Year	Category	Nominated work / recipient	Result	Ref.
2017	Best Musical Moment (shared with the Cast of Grease Live)	"You're the One That I Want"	Won	

=== MTV Europe Music Awards ===
Year	Category	Nominated work / recipient	Result	Ref.
2012	Best Song	"Call Me Maybe"	Won	
2012	Best Push Act	Carly Rae Jepsen	Won	
2012	Best New Act	Carly Rae Jepsen	Nominated	
2012	Best North American Act	Carly Rae Jepsen	Nominated	
2015	Best Canadian Act	Carly Rae Jepsen	Nominated	
2019	Best Canadian Act	Carly Rae Jepsen	Nominated	

=== MTV Video Music Awards Japan ===
Year	Category	Nominated work / recipient	Result	Ref.
2013	Best New Artist	"Call Me Maybe"	Won	
2013	Album of the Year	Kiss	Nominated	
2015	Best Female Video – International	"I Really Like You"	Nominated	

== MP3 Music Awards ==
Year	Category	Nominated work	Result	Ref.
2012	"Call Me Maybe"	The IRP Award	Nominated	

== Nickelodeon Kids' Choice Awards ==
Year	Category	Nominated work	Result	Ref.
2013	Favorite Song	"Call Me Maybe"	Nominated	

== NRJ Music Award ==
Year	Category	Nominated work / recipient	Result	Ref.
2012	International Breakthrough of the Year	Carly Rae Jepsen	Won	
2012	International Song of the Year	"Call Me Maybe"	Nominated	
2012	International Group/Duo of the Year	Owl City & Carly Rae Jepsen	Nominated	

== People's Choice Awards ==
Year	Category	Nominated work / recipient	Result	Ref.
2013	Favorite Song of the Year	"Call Me Maybe"	Nominated	
2013	Favorite Music Video	"Call Me Maybe"	Nominated	
2013	Carly Rae Jepsen	Favorite Breakout Artist	Nominated	

== Polaris Music Prize ==
Year	Category	Nominated work / recipient	Result	Ref.
2016	Shortlist	Emotion	Nominated	
2016	Longlist	Emotion	Nominated	
2017	Longlist	Emotion: Side B	Nominated	
2019	Longlist	Dedicated	Nominated	

== Queerty Awards ==
Year	Category	Nominated work / recipient	Result	Ref.
2023	Best Music Video	"The Loneliest Time" (with Rufus Wainwright)	Nominated	

== RTHK International Pop Poll Awards ==
Year	Category	Nominated work / recipient	Result	Ref.
2016	Top Ten International Gold Songs	"I Really Like You"	Won	

== Rober Awards Music Poll ==
Year	Category	Nominated work / recipient	Result	Ref.
2015	Best Pop	Carly Rae Jepsen	Nominated	
2015	Guilty Pleasure	Carly Rae Jepsen	Won	
2016	Guilty Pleasure	Carly Rae Jepsen	Nominated	

== SOCAN Awards ==
Year	Category	Nominated work	Result	Ref.
2014	International Achievement Award	"Call Me Maybe"	Won	
2019	Most Performed Song in SOCAN History	"Call Me Maybe"	Won	

== SiriusXM Indies Awards ==
Year	Category	Nominated work / recipient	Result	Ref.
2013	Single of the Year	"Call Me Maybe"	Won	
2013	Video of the Year	"Call Me Maybe"	Nominated	
2013	Artist of the Year	Carly Rae Jepsen	Won	
2013	Most Played Independent Artist or Group of the Year	Carly Rae Jepsen	Won	
2013	Female Artist of the Year	Carly Rae Jepsen	Nominated	
2013	Pop Artist or Group of the Year	Carly Rae Jepsen	Nominated	
2013	Most Follow Artist of the Year	Carly Rae Jepsen	Nominated	
2013	Best-Selling Independent Release of the Year	Kiss	Nominated	

== Teen Choice Awards ==
Year	Category	Nominated work / recipient	Result	Ref.
2012	Choice: Summer Song	"Call Me Maybe"	Won	
2012	Choice: Breakout Artist	Carly Rae Jepsen	Won	
2012	Choice: Music Star Female	Carly Rae Jepsen	Nominated	

== The Daily Californian Art Awards ==
Year	Nominee / work	Award	Result	Ref.
2018	"Party for One"	Best Non-Billboard Song	Won	

== Western Canadian Music Awards ==
Year	Category	Nominated work	Result	Ref.
2010	Song of the Year	"Tug of War"	Nominated	
2012	Pop Recording of the Year	"Curiosity"	Won	

== World Music Awards ==
Year	Category	Nominated work / recipient	Result	Ref.
2014	World's Best Video	"Call Me Maybe"	Nominated	
2014	World's Best Entertainer of the Year	Carly Rae Jepsen	Nominated	
