= Let Me Be Me (disambiguation) =

"Let Me Be Me" is a song by Jessica Mauboy

== Music ==
- Let Me Be Me, album by Cheryl Pepsii Riley 2006

=== Songs ===
- "Let Me Be Me", song by Tammy Wynette 1979
- "Let Me Be Me", song by White Lion album Return of the Pride
- "Let Me Be Me", song by Carmen and Camille from Two
- "Just Let Me Be Me", by Soul Serenade (Gloria Lynne album)
