= Sour Candy =

Sour candy is a type of candy that occurs as a result of the sour sanding process.

Sour Candy may also refer to:

- "Sour Candy" (Carly Rae Jepsen song), featuring Josh Ramsay, 2009
- "Sour Candy" (Lady Gaga and Blackpink song), 2020
