= Curiosity (EP) =

EP by Carly Rae Jepsen
- Released: February 14, 2012
- Recorded: April 2010–January 2012
- Genres: Electropop; pop
- Length: 20:11
- Labels: 604; School Boy; Interscope
- Producers: Josh Ramsay; Ryan Stewart

Carly Rae Jepsen chronology
| Tug of War (2008) | Curiosity (2012) | Kiss (2012) |

Singles from Curiosity
- 1. "Call Me Maybe" Released: September 20, 2011; 2. "Curiosity" Released: May 1, 2012

Curiosity is the second extended play (EP) by Canadian singer-songwriter Carly Rae Jepsen. It was released on February 14, 2012, by 604, Schoolboy, and Interscope Records. Initially listed on the iTunes Store with a full-length tracklist, Curiosity was cut down to a six-song EP just days before its release. The full-length album titled Kiss was released 7 months later containing only two songs from the EP on its standard edition. Curiosity is an electropop and pop EP, and its tracks are influenced by various genres such as dance-pop and R&B. The EP's lyrical content is mostly about love.

Curiosity was praised for its quality of the tracks and was labelled mainstream. It peaked at number six on the Canadian Albums Chart. The lead single, "Call Me Maybe", was a commercial success, topping the charts in several countries and is one of the best-selling singles of all time, with over 18 million copies sold. The title track served as the second and final single almost a year later, and was modestly successful in Jepsen's home country of Canada.

== Background ==
Jepsen's second studio album was initially planned to be released on February 14, 2012; however, she chose not to release it because she wanted to make sure she "got the second CD right. I think I got a little nervous about the idea of the sophomore being a little less-than because it's so rushed. So I wanted to give myself the time to not feel that pressure." She then worked with songwriter Josh Ramsay and producer Ryan Stewart on most of the album's tracks.

Jepsen's songwriting process was inspired by her life and friends. After the recording sessions were completed, Curiosity was announced as a full-length album, with a digital release date confirmed for February 14, 2012. A few days before its official release, however, the label decided to change the format of the album, turning it into an extended play.

== Composition ==
"Both Sides Now"
A 23-second sample of the chorus which features Jepsen singing the ballad over an upbeat bubblegum pop influenced background.

An electropop and pop EP, Curiosity opens with "Call Me Maybe", an upbeat track that draws influences from dance-pop and R&B. The clever lyrics of the song describes the "infatuation and inconvenience of a love at first sight", as described by Bill Lamb of About.com. During the pre-chorus, the singer states, "Ripped jeans, skin was showing/Hot night, wind was blowing/Where you think you're going, baby?" As the chorus begins, the background incorporates synthesized-string chords, and she sings, "Hey, I just met you, And this is crazy, But here's my number, So call me maybe." Melody Lau of Rolling Stone wrote that "Call Me Maybe" is a "Taylor Swift meets Robyn" song. The title track, "Curiosity", has a similar sound to "Call Me Maybe", and features heavy dance beats and catchy hooks. In the song, Jepsen sings about being poorly treated by a bad boy, and begs for more of his love. "Picture" is a ballad that focuses on patience in a relationship. Critics noted that the song would work well during the climax of a motion picture due to its lyrical content.

"Talk to Me" and "Just a Step Away" were both described as mid-tempo pop songs that alludes to summer love, teen love and that first crush. Fiona Eadie of Cadence Canada noted that in both tracks, Carly is able to transcend the listener "to a porch swing or riding a bicycle along an old dirt road in the countryside's summer sunshine. Her voice sings the highs and lows of love and everything that comes along with it." The final song is a cover of Joni Mitchell's "Both Sides Now". It is also an upbeat ballad that differs from the original version in the sense that Jepsen's version is "fresh and modern with her unique bubblegum twist", according to Fiona Eadie of Cadence Canada. Critics also added that Jepsen will be able to "attract a new generation to this widely recognized hit" with her "unique version."

== Singles ==
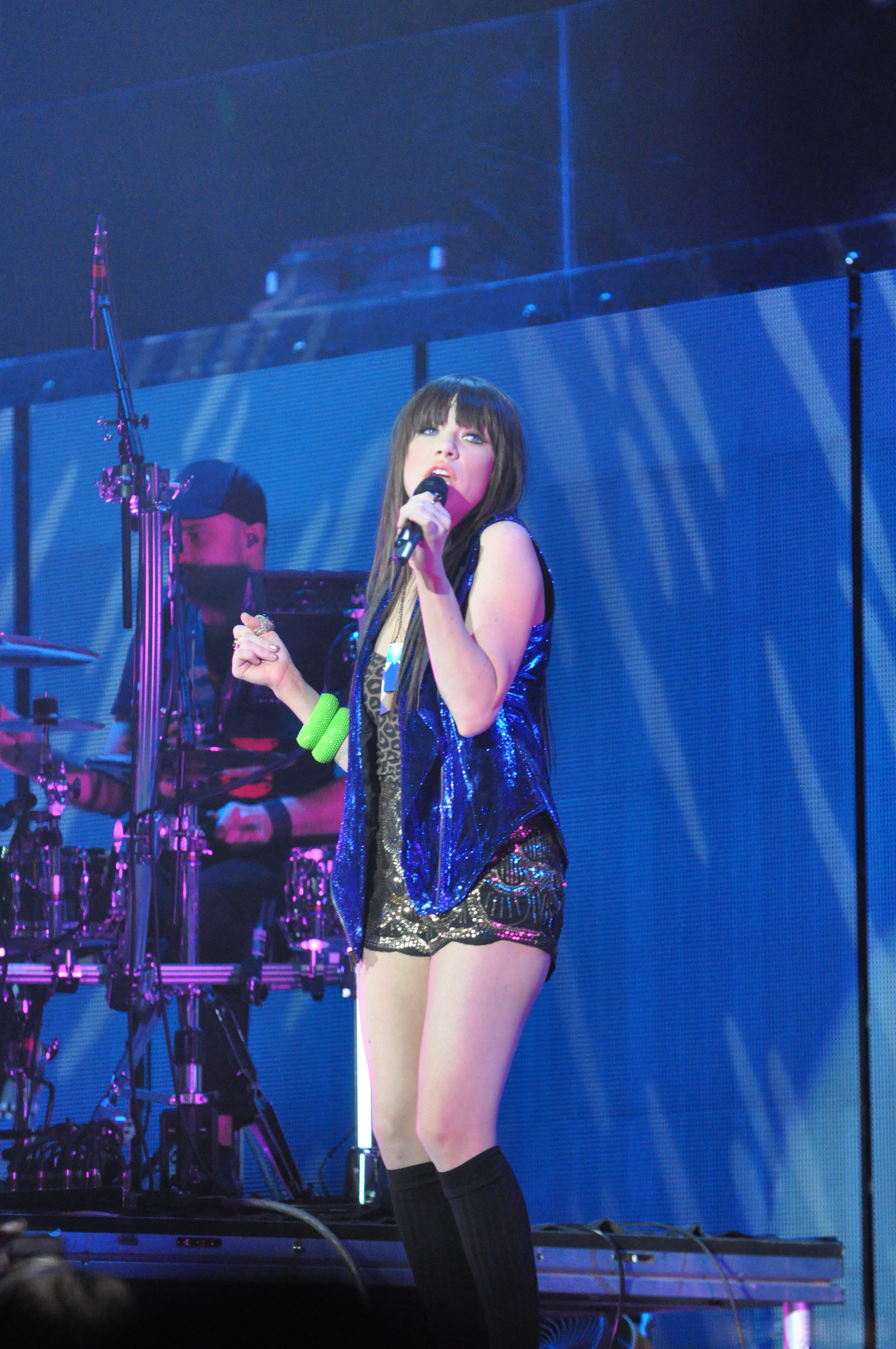
Jepsen performing "Curiosity" during Believe Tour

"Call Me Maybe" was released as the lead single on September 20, 2011. After singers Justin Bieber and Selena Gomez tweeted about the song, Jepsen gained international attention and was signed to Schoolboy Records, releasing her single in the United States through the label. The song received generally positive reviews from contemporary critics, who praised its composition and clever lyrical content, while deeming it as the perfect pop song. "Call Me Maybe" has attained commercial success worldwide, topping the charts in several countries, and is one of the best-selling singles of all time, with over 18 million copies sold. An accompanying music video portrays Jepsen trying to gain attention from her attractive neighbor, who is revealed to be gay at the close of the story. To promote the song, Jepsen has performed on several live televised shows, including on The Ellen DeGeneres Show, where she made her US television debut, and at the MTV Europe Music Awards.

"Curiosity" was released as the second single on May 1, 2012. On March 26, Jepsen visited WBBM-FM's Morning Show and performed the two singles. In the last week of January 2013, she filmed an acoustic performance of the song in Tokyo exclusively for Billboard.

== Critical reception ==
Curiosity ratings
Review scores
| Source | Rating |
|---|---|
| About.com | 4.5/5 stars |
| AllMusic | 3.5/5 stars |
| idobi Radio | 4/5 stars |

Bill Lamb of About.com began his review stating that Curiosity is always interesting to have new artists making music both familiar and fresh. He went to describe the six "electronic pop songs strong, almost too short to be satisfying but immensely repeatable". Lamb also added that Jepsen's "style is summery and bright without the emotional bogging down of [Demi] Lovato or the flat out drudgery of Jessie J." Allmusic critic Jon O'Brien stated that, when compared to Jepsen's previous effort, Tug of War (2008), the EP "unexpectedly abandons her previous singer/songwriter approach in favor of an unashamed bubblegum sound which harks back to the early 2000s pop princess glory days of Britney, Christina, Jessica, and Mandy."

Fiona Eadie of Cadence Canada described the musical style of the EP as "pop", describing it as "not in the annoying, auto-tune, and talentless way. Her perfectly pitched voice makes it clear that this girl has real talent." Eadie summarized her review saying that Curiosity "is filled with music that dances. And it is your choice to listen to it with or without a hairbrush (a.k.a. microphone) in front of your bedroom mirror. Overall a great EP. I can't wait to put the top down and blast her tunes all summer." Jen Appel of idobi Radio commented that, overall, Curiosity is the kind of extended play that brings attention from the teenage public due to its mainstream songs, and added, "if you are looking for fun, lovable songs to make you smile, this is your go-to mix." Appel only criticized the lyrical content, noting that it is "very childish but seem to work with the music nonetheless."

== Track listing ==
Curiosity track listing
| No. | Title | Writer(s) | Producer(s) | Length |
|---|---|---|---|---|
| 1. | "Call Me Maybe" | Carly Rae Jepsen; Josh Ramsay; Tavish Crowe | Ramsay | 3:13 |
| 2. | "Curiosity" | Jepsen; Ryan Stewart | Stewart | 3:26 |
| 3. | "Picture" | Jepsen | Stewart | 3:03 |
| 4. | "Talk to Me" | Jepsen; Stewart | Stewart | 2:51 |
| 5. | "Just a Step Away" | Carly Rae Jepsen; The Jepsen Family; Stewart | Stewart | 3:46 |
| 6. | "Both Sides Now" | Joni Mitchell | Stewart | 3:52 |
| Total length: | | | | 20:11 |

== Charts ==
Chart performance
| Chart (2012) | Peak position |
|---|---|
| Canadian Albums Chart | 6 |
