= Carmen and Camille =

Canadian musician duo

Carmen & Camille
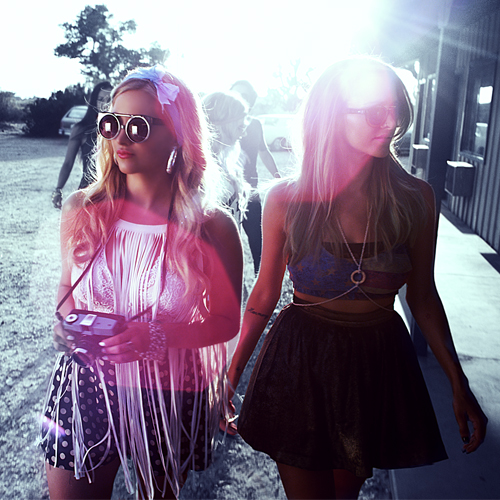

Background information
- Origin: Vancouver, British Columbia, Canada
- Genres: Pop
- Years active: 2006–present
- Labels: TwinSpin Music
- Members: Carmen Thomas; Camille Thomas
- Website: carmenandcamille.com

Carmen Thomas and Camille Thomas are Canadian musicians and twin sisters who perform as Carmen & Camille. Their hit single, "Shine 4U," received a nomination for the 2010 Juno Award for Dance Recording of the Year. Their début studio album, Two, was released in 2006 followed by 2 EPs.

== History ==
The sisters were raised in White Rock, British Columbia and graduated from Semiahmoo Secondary School in nearby Surrey. Their father, John Thomas, currently serves as their professional manager. Their parents are also musical and part of the reason why the twin sisters went into business. Carmen holds an Associate of Arts degree in broadcast journalism from the British Columbia Institute of Technology. She appeared as a host on Tommy Wolski's Sport of Kings, a weekly Citytv sports news show on horse racing. Camille, who began her studies in fashion design, later transferred to Vancouver Community College, where she completed the jazz vocal program.

Carmen & Camille displayed a love of performing music from early childhood. They have cited Sheryl Crow, Depeche Mode, Fleetwood Mac, Heart, Jimi Hendrix, Janis Joplin, Led Zeppelin, No Doubt, and Pink Floyd as among their musical influences. As students in elementary school, Carmen played the flute, while Camille joined a jazz choir. Shortly after graduation from high school, they decided to perform and record music professionally. The sisters, who write their own songs as well as play guitars and flute, began singing at clubs and other venues in major cities throughout North America, Europe, and the Middle East.

The twins are currently active on their youtube channel titled (Carmen & Camille).

== Career ==
In March 2006, Carmen & Camille released their début album, Two, on their own label, TwinSpin Music. Several songs from this record were featured on the MTV reality show series The Hills, giving the sisters' music widespread exposure for the first time. Their 2009 single "Shine 4U," co-written with producer Ryan Stewart, won the CHUM Emerging Artist Initiative. Consequently, the song enjoyed national airplay across Canada, and the music video was televised on MuchMusic. In March 2010, "Shine 4U" received additional recognition as a nominee for the 2010 Juno Award for Dance Recording of the Year. Carmen and Camille have sung the Canadian National Anthem at several games for the Canucks hockey team.

Carmen & Camille divide their time between Vancouver and Los Angeles, where they set up residence in December 2009.

== Discography ==
=== Studio albums ===
Year	Title	Release date	Label	Tracks
2013	NEON [EP]	March, 2013	TwinSpin Music	1. Without You; 2. Until the Walls Come Down; 3. IDGAF; 4. Neon Lights; 5. Big Love; 6. Savior; 7. Haunting Me; 8. Away
2010	Shine 4U (Limited Edition EP) [EP]	May, 2010	TwinSpin Music	1. When You Choose; 2. Battle Scars; 3. Don't Play Me Out; 4. Headlines; 5. Say What You Want; 6. Shine 4U; 7. Boom Boom
2009	Don't Play Me Out [EP]	March 3, 2009	TwinSpin Music	1. Don't Play Me Out; 2. Anymore; 3. When You Choose; 4. Phone; 5. Sensible; 6. My Love
2006	Two	October 17, 2006	TwinSpin Music	1. Lose My Voice; 2. Another Lie; 3. Without Reason; 4. I Will Never; 5. Call Display; 6. Breaking Down; 7. How Deep is the Water; 8. What's Left; 9. Let Me Be Me; 10. Understand; 11. This Again; 12. Fantasy; 13. To Believe

=== Singles ===
Year	Title	Release date	Label
2013	"Christmas Kiss"	November 19, 2013	TwinSpin Music
2012	"IDGAF"	November 2, 2012	TwinSpin Music
2010	"Boom Boom"	April, 2010	TwinSpin Music
2009	"Shine 4U"	June 23, 2009	TwinSpin Music

== Awards and nominations ==
Year	Association	Category	Nominated work	Result
2010	Juno Awards	Dance Recording of the Year	Shine 4U	Nominated
