= Linda Warren =

American novelist

- Born: Linda Siegert; July 2, 1945 (age 81); Brazos County, Texas, U.S.
- Occupation: Novelist
- Writing career
- Genre: romance novels
- Website: lindawarren.net

Linda Pearl Siegert Warren (born July 2, 1945) is an American author of contemporary romance novels.

== Biography ==
Warren was born Linda Siegert in Brazos County, Texas in 1945. After graduation from Bryan High School in Bryan, Texas, Warren enrolled in a nursing program offered by Scott & White. After less than a year in the program, Warren was diagnosed with rheumatoid arthritis. Her pain became so bad that she was unable to walk to class and was forced to drop out.

To keep herself occupied during her frequent hospital stays, Warren read voraciously. Finally her father, James Siegert, and husband, Billy Warren, suggested that she write her own novels. In 1985, she began writing. She sent her first completed manuscript, Christmas Cradle, to Harlequin Books. Harlequin rejected the manuscript, with a note that it had a "good plot, but [the] characters [were] not three-dimensional". Encouraged by the fact that Harlequin thought her plotting had promise, Warren continued writing. Her next two manuscripts did not satisfy her, but she sent her fourth attempt back to Harlequin. The manuscript was shuffled through the different Harlequin lines before being purchased on April 19, 1999 by the Harlequin SuperRomance line.

Her second Harlequin release, Deep in the Heart of Texas, won the Romantic Times Reviewer's Choice Award for Best Super Romance in 2000. Two years later, Warren won the Golden Quill Award, given by the Desert Rose Chapter of the Romance Writers of America, for the Best Long Contemporary of 2002 for her novel Cowboy at the Crossroads.

After releasing nine novels for Harlequin, Warren returned to her first manuscript. After she reworked it, the story was finally accepted by Harlequin. It reached the top 10 on the Waldenbooks Series Best-Seller List, marking the first time one of her novels had placed on the list.

In 2007, Warren received the Bookseller's Best Award in the Long Contemporary Category for her novel The Cowboy's Return, published in the Harlequin American Romance line. The same year, she placed third in the Lories, and was a double finalist in the Aspen Gold contest for The Cowboy's Return and Son of Texas. In 2009, she was a finalist in the RWA RITA contest with Texas Heir.

Warren writes every day. In those mornings that she does not have physical therapy, Warren reads email and participates on various blogs. In the afternoons, she writes from 1:00-3:30. She returns to her writing at 7pm and works for as long as she can, sometimes until 1:00 a.m.

== Bibliography ==
=== Novels ===
- The Truth About Jane Doe (2000)
- Deep in the Heart of Texas (2000)
- Emily's Daughter (2001)
- Cowboy at the Crossroads (2002)
- On the Texas Border (2002)
- A Baby by Christmas (2003)
- The Wrong Woman (2003)
- Straight from the Heart (2003)
- The Christmas Cradle (2004)
- The Right Woman (2004)
- All Roads Lead to Texas (2005)
- Forgotten Son (2005)
- The Cowboy's Return (2006)
- Son of Texas (2006)
- The Bad Son (2006)
- Once a Cowboy (2007)
- Adopted Son (2007)
- Texas Bluff (2008)
- Always a Mother (2008)
- Texas Heir (2008) - Rita Finalist for Contemporary Series
- The Sheriff of Horseshoe, Texas (2009)
- Caitlyn's Prize (2009)
- Madison's Children (2009)
- Skylar's Outlaw (2010)
- Her Christmas Hero (2010)
- The Texan's Secret (2011)
- The Texan's Bride (2011)
- The Texan's Christmas (2011)

=== Omnibus ===
- Christmas, Texas Style (2005) (with Tina Leonard, Leah Vale)
- Wanted: A Family for Christmas (2006) (with Mollie Molay)
