= Curiosity (song) =

Single by Carly Rae Jepsen

from the EP Curiosity and the album Kiss
- Released: May 1, 2012
- Studio: Winecellar Studios, Vancouver, British Columbia, Canada
- Genre: Dance; synthpop
- Length: 3:26 (EP version); 3:33 (album version)
- Label: 604
- Songwriters: Carly Rae Jepsen; Ryan Stewart
- Producer: Ryan Stewart

Carly Rae Jepsen singles chronology
"Call Me Maybe" (2011)	"Curiosity" (2012)	"Good Time" (2012)

"Curiosity" is a song recorded by Canadian singer Carly Rae Jepsen for her extended play (EP) Curiosity (2012). It was released as the second single from the EP on May 1, 2012, through 604 Records. Produced and co-written by Ryan Stewart, Musically, "Curiosity" is an upbeat pop track that is influenced by dance and synthpop. Lyrically, the track alludes to a girl who is poorly treated by a bad boy, and begs for more of his love.

Upon its release, "Curiosity" received generally positive reviews from contemporary critics, who deemed it similar to Jepsen's previous single, "Call Me Maybe". Following its release, the track reached number 18 on the Canadian Hot 100, and peaked within the top 10 of the Canada Hot AC and the South Korea International Singles charts. It was also certified Gold in Canada.A new version of the track was included on her international debut album Kiss.

== Background and release ==
Jepsen's first single, "Call Me Maybe", was released only in Canada on September 20, 2011. In January 2012, pop singers Justin Bieber and Selena Gomez were in the country and heard the track on the mainstream radio. After they tweeted about it on their personal profiles, Jepsen instantly gained international attention, and got signed by Scooter Braun to his Schoolboy Records. Braun revealed that Bieber has "never jumped out and promoted an artist like this before. He sends me different YouTube videos of unsigned artists that he'd like to work with, but never someone who already had a song out and is on the radio." Worldwide distribution of the single was done through Interscope Records. "Call Me Maybe" attained worldwide success, reaching number one in Australia, Canada, United States, Finland, Ireland, New Zealand, and the United Kingdom, while peaking inside the top ten in Belgium, Netherlands and Norway. Following the surprising performance of the single, Jepsen's second studio effort, Curiosity, was released on February 14, 2012, in Canada only, where it debuted and peaked at number six. It was released as the second single from the EP on May 1, 2012.

== Composition and reception ==
"Curiosity" was written by Jepsen, while song production and additional writing was done by Ryan Stewart. The song features dance beats and catchy hooks. In the song, Jepsen sings about being poorly treated by a bad boy, and begs for more of his love, opening the song with the lines, "Break a bone, got me on my knees / You break my heart, just to watch it bleed". "Curiosity" received generally positive reviews from contemporary critics. Before its release as a single, Ben Norman of About.com noted that the track was "the obvious follow up to 'Call Me Maybe' although stresses the beats a little more than I'd personally like." Jon O'Brien of Allmusic said that both "Curiosity" and "Picture" are "convincing forays into infectious synth pop," while Fiona Eadie of Cadence Canada said that the song is "still amazingly upbeat." Jen Appel of idobi Radio considered "Curiosity" similar to "Call Me Maybe", adding that the song "brings the same lighthearted vibe while touching on a more personal note. This song encompasses the feelings of a girl fighting to keep her relationship alive while struggling with the ever-present curiosity of 'what ifs'."

== Promotion ==
=== Music video ===
Jepsen shot a video for the song on June 5, 2012, with director Colin Minihan. The music video was not released, and leaked on November 25, 2012. According to the description of the leak, "this video was shelved because it was "too sexy" for her new tween demographic." The video starts with Jepsen on a taxi cab with rainy weather. She writes a text message that reads, "Where are you? I'm outside". She then leaves the cab, and runs into an unknown house. She knocks at the door, but with no answer, she looks under the carpet under her feet and find a key, with which she enters the house to find a long hallway full of doors and an image of herself at the end, now with different clothes. Jepsen keeps opening different doors, only to find other hallways.

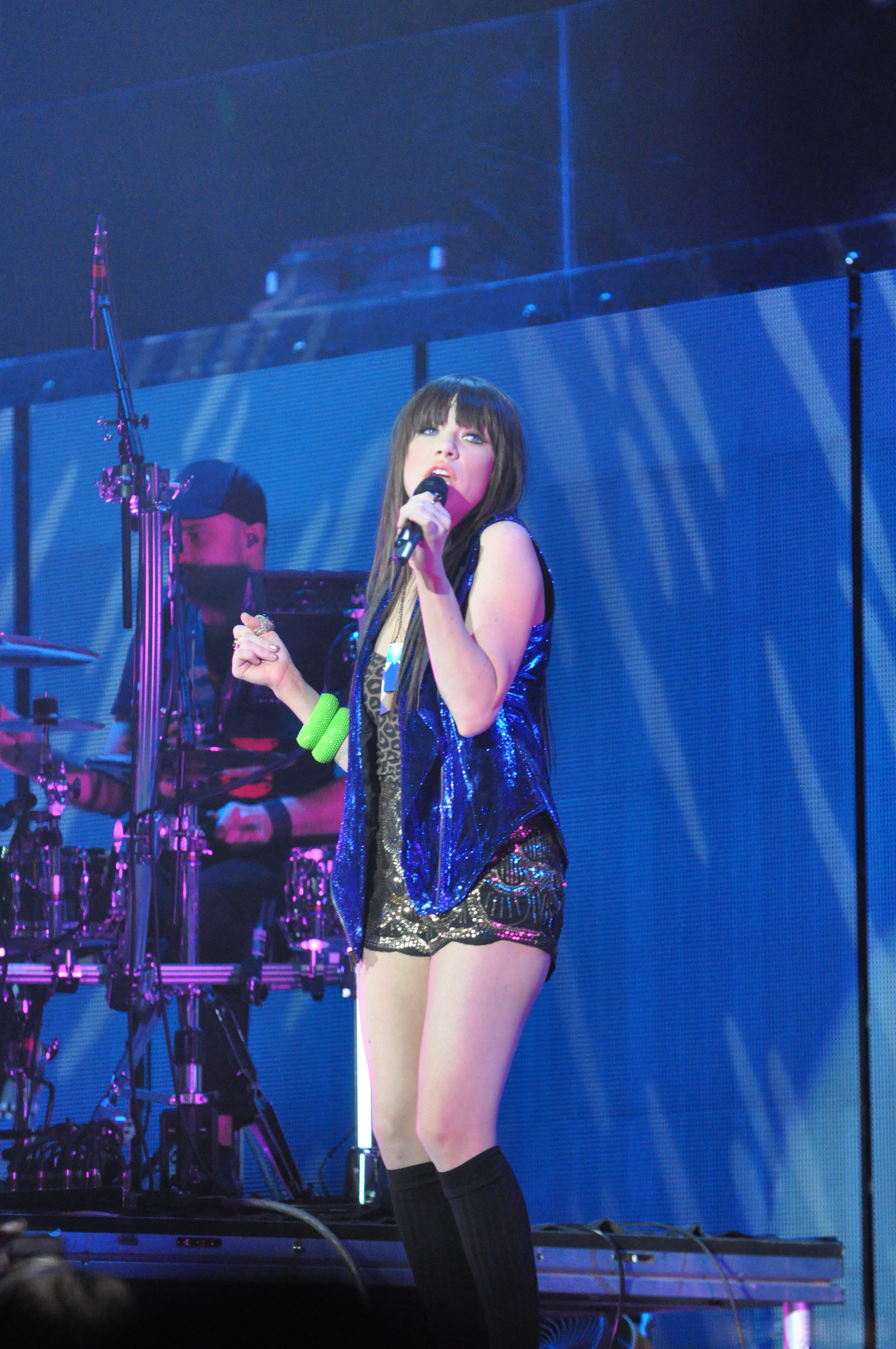
Jepsen performing "Curiosity" during Believe Tour.

The scene then cuts to a bedroom where she meets her love interest, and they make love together. Back to the hallway, Jepsen opens another door where she sees a video of her wedding with the same guy. It cuts again to the bedroom, when it's revealed that there is another woman in the bedroom who stares at them both with a sadness expression on her face. Then we see Jepsen and the love interest fighting outside of the house in the middle of rain, only to find out that he had actually cheated on her with that other woman and she had discovered at that moment. She runs outside of the house and goes back to the cab.

=== Live performances ===
On March 26, 2012, Jepsen visited WBBM-FM's Morning Show and performed two tracks of her EP, "Call Me Maybe" and "Curiosity". In the last week of January 2013, the singer filmed an acoustic performance of the song in Tokyo exclusively for Billboard. The song was also performed at her first two concert tours, The Summer Kiss Tour (2013) and the Gimmie Love Tour (2015–2016).

== Commercial performance ==
Upon its release, the single fared less successful than its predecessor, but was modestly successful in Jepsen's home country of Canada. In the country, the single charted at number 18 on the Canadian Hot 100, becoming her second top 20 hit on the chart. It also charted at number 14 on the CHR/Top 40 chart and number 11 on the Canada AC chart, and peaked at number 6 on the Hot AC chart. By the end of 2012, the single was positioned at number 55 on the Canadian Hot 100. The song would later be certified Gold by Music Canada (MC) for equivalent sales of 40,000 units in the country. In South Korea, the single charted at number 10 on the South Korea International Singles chart.

== Track listing ==
- Digital download
1. "Curiosity" – 3:26

== Charts and certifications ==
=== Charts ===
==== Weekly charts ====
Chart (2012)	Peak position
Canada Hot 100 (Billboard)	18
Canada AC (Billboard)	11
Canada CHR/Top 40 (Billboard)	14
Canada Hot AC (Billboard)	6
South Korea International Singles (Gaon)	10

==== Year-end charts ====
Chart (2012)	Peak position
Canada (Canadian Hot 100)	55

=== Certifications ===
Region	Certification	Certified units/sales
Canada (Music Canada)	Gold	40,000^{*}
^{*} Sales figures based on certification alone.

== Release history ==
Region	Date	Format	Label
Canada	May 1, 2012	Digital download	604 Records
