= Tug of War (Carly Rae Jepsen album) =

Studio album by Carly Rae Jepsen
- Released: September 30, 2008
- Recorded: 2008
- Studio: The WineCellar; the Umbrella Factory (Vancouver, British Columbia)
- Genre: Folk
- Length: 31:31
- Label: MapleMusic; Fontana North; 604
- Producer: Ryan Stewart

Carly Rae Jepsen chronology
Tug of War (2008)	Curiosity (2012)

Singles from Tug of War
- 1. "Tug of War" Released: September 16, 2008; 2. "Bucket" Released: April 4, 2009; 3. "Sour Candy" Released: October 30, 2009

Tug of War is the debut studio album by Canadian singer-songwriter Carly Rae Jepsen. Released through MapleMusic, Fontana North and 604 Records, it is mainly produced by Canadian record producer and songwriter Ryan Stewart. Three singles, "Tug of War", "Bucket" and "Sour Candy" supported the album, along with a cover version of John Denver's 1973 single "Sunshine on My Shoulders", which became a promotional single.

After participating at Canadian Idol in 2007, Jepsen began to gain recognition. The same year, she joined Canadian record labels such as 604 Records and MapleMusic Recordings. Commercially, Tug of War failed to chart in major music charts, selling over 10,000 copies in Canada as of June 25, 2012.

== Background ==
In 2007, Jepsen gained popularity by attending at Canadian TV program, Canadian Idol. She signed a record deal with Canadian indie record label, 604 Records, co-founded by Jonathan Simkin and a frontman of Canadian rock band Nickelback, Chad Kroeger. The following year, she also signed with another independent label, MapleMusic, and she began to work on her debut studio album, Tug of War.

== Composition ==
Tug of War has been described as folk record; Washington Post's Allison Stewart called the album as "an over-processed coffeehouse folk outing", while Jacob Uitti of American Songwriter described the album as "folk debut studio album". CBC Music observed that the record emerged before "synth-pop had yet to flourish" and at a point when rock remained "the foundational base of pop" rather than hip-hop. They also found that Jepsen developed a sound "rooted in acoustic guitars and folk sounds" following her third-place finish on Canadian Idol, and that when the album shifts toward a more overt pop sensibility, it "veers closer to Jack Johnson than Cyndi Lauper", aligning it more closely with the singer-songwriter style of Johnson than the theatrical, synth-driven approach associated with Lauper.

== Promotion and release ==
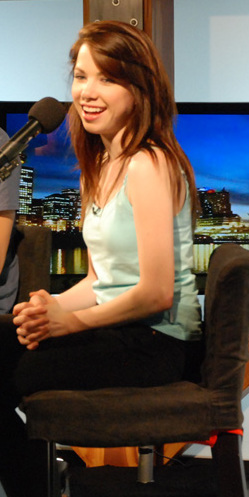
Jepsen in 2009

Tug of War's first promotional single is a cover version of John Denver's song "Sunshine on My Shoulders" (1973), released through iTunes Store on June 16, 2008. The album's lead single, "Tug of War", was released on September 16, peaking at No. 36 on the Canadian Hot 100 chart. Its music video was released in 2009. (Note: The official music video for "Tug of War" was released in 2011 through her Vevo channel; however, she uploaded the same music video in 2009 at her YouTube channel.) "Bucket" was chosen as the second single; it peaked at No. 32 on the Canadian Hot 100. It samples the children's song, "There's a Hole in My Bucket". Its music video was released in the same year. The third and final single from the album was "Sour Candy", which features Josh Ramsay of Marianas Trench on the single version. Ramsay also produced the latter song, marking the only song on the album that was not produced by the album's main producer Ryan Stewart.

== Reception ==
Professional ratings
Review scores
Source	Rating
AllMusic	3.5/5 stars

Chris True of AllMusic noted that the album established Jepsen's presence in the Canadian pop scene following her appearance on Canadian Idol, where she placed third. He highlighted the success of "Sunshine on My Shoulders" as well as "Tug of War" and "Bucket", both of which became hits in Canada. True also credited the album's material with helping Jepsen earn multiple national award nominations. Jon Caramanica from The New York Times described the album as "amiable" and "slicker than it sounds". Caramanica further noted that the record "doesn't reach far, but it overdelivers".

In 2010 Juno Awards, Jepsen and Stewart were nominated for Songwriter of the Year. As of June 25, 2012, the album has sold 10,000 copies in Canada.

== Track listing ==
All tracks are written by Carly Rae Jepsen and Ryan Stewart and produced by Ryan Stewart, except where noted.

Standard edition
No.	Title	Writer(s)	Producer(s)	Length
1.	"Bucket"			2:51
2.	"Tug of War"			3:44
3.	"Money and the Ego"			3:10
4.	"Tell Me"			2:20
5.	"Heavy Lifting"			3:41
6.	"Sunshine on My Shoulders"	John Denver; Dick Kniss; Mike Taylor		3:35
7.	"Worldly Matters"			3:21
8.	"Sweet Talker"			2:56
9.	"Hotel Shampoos"			2:52
10.	"Sour Candy"	Jepsen; Josh Ramsay	Ramsay	3:01
Total length:				31:31

Physical reissue edition
No.	Title	Length
10.	"Sour Candy" (featuring Josh Ramsay)	3:02
Total length:		31:32

Japanese deluxe edition
No.	Title	Length
11.	"I Still Wonder" (acoustic)	1:40
12.	"Tug of War" (Dave "Rave" Ogilvie remix)	4:02
13.	"Sour Candy" (featuring Josh Ramsay)	3:02
Total length:		40:15

== Credits and personnel ==
Credits were adapted from the liner notes of Japanese edition and AllMusic.

=== Recording locations ===
- The WineCellar; Vancouver, BC (1–9)
- The Umbrella Factory; Vancouver, BC (10)

=== Personnel ===
- Carly Rae Jepsen – lead vocals
- Ryan Stewart – banjo, bass guitar, clapping, drum programming, drums, guitar, keyboards, percussion, sound effects, vocals, production, engineering, mixing
- Josh Ramsay – bass guitar, drums, guitar, keyboards, background vocals, production, engineering
- João Carvalho – mastering
- Rico Amezquita – cover photo, photography
- Mario Vaira – design, photography

== Release history ==
List of release dates and formats
Region	Date	Label(s)	Format(s)	Version	Ref.
Canada	September 30, 2008	MapleMusic; Fontana North; 604	CD; digital download	Original	
Canada	July 24, 2015	604	LP	Reissue	
Japan	May 19, 2010	Pony Canyon; Surfrock International	CD	Reissue	
United States	June 14, 2011	604	Digital download	Reissue	
United States	October 1, 2013	604; Alliance	CD	Reissue	
Europe	July 10, 2015	604	LP	Reissue	
