= Bucket (song) =

Single by Carly Rae Jepsen

from the album Tug of War
- Released: April 4, 2009
- Recorded: 2007‒2008
- Length: 2:51
- Label: Fontana North; MapleMusic
- Songwriters: Ryan Stewart; Carly Rae Jepsen
- Producer: Ryan Stewart

Carly Rae Jepsen singles chronology
"Tug of War" (2008)	"Bucket" (2009)	"Sour Candy" (2009)

Music video
- "Bucket" on YouTube

"Bucket" is a song by Canadian singer-songwriter Carly Rae Jepsen, released in April 4, 2009 as the second single from her debut studio album, Tug of War. The song peaked at number 32 on the Canadian Hot 100. "Bucket" contains elements from "There's a Hole in My Bucket".

== Music video ==
The official music video for the song premiered August 5, 2009, and received heavy airplay on Canadian music video channel MuchMusic. The video features Jepsen and her friends spending the day on the beach, ending with a bonfire scene. The video was shot in Vancouver, British Columbia, Canada in late April 2009, and the weather was "freezing cold" on the day of filming. All the extras in the video are Jepsen's real-life friends, and Jepsen commented that it felt more like a "beach party" than a music video.

== Chart performance ==
"Bucket" chart performance
Chart (2009)	Peak position
Canada Hot 100 (Billboard)	32
Canada AC (Billboard)	30
Canada CHR/Top 40 (Billboard)	24
Canada Hot AC (Billboard)	13

== Certifications ==
"Bucket" certifications
Region	Certification	Certified units/sales
Canada (Music Canada)	Gold	20,000^{*}
^{*} Sales figures based on certification alone.

== Release history ==
"Bucket" release history
Country	Date	Format	Label
Canada	April 4, 2009	Digital download	Fontana, MapleMusic
