= Sour Candy (Carly Rae Jepsen song) =

Single by Carly Rae Jepsen featuring Josh Ramsay

from the album Tug of War
- Released: October 30, 2009
- Recorded: 2007–08
- Length: 3:01
- Label: Fontana North; MapleMusic
- Songwriters: Carly Rae Jepsen; Josh Ramsay
- Producer: Josh Ramsay

Carly Rae Jepsen singles chronology
"Bucket" (2009)	"Sour Candy" (2009)	"Call Me Maybe" (2012)

Josh Ramsay singles chronology
"Sour Candy" (2009)	"Hush" (2011)

Music video
- "Sour Candy" on YouTube

"Sour Candy" is a song by Canadian singer-songwriter Carly Rae Jepsen, released on October 30, 2009 as the third and final single from her debut studio album, Tug of War. The song was written by Jepsen and Marianas Trench lead vocalist Josh Ramsay, who also produced the song and is featured as a vocalist on the single version. It failed to chart on the Canadian Hot 100, but did enter the Canada Hot AC airplay chart monitored by Nielsen BDS Radio.

== Content ==
This song discusses the loss of a relationship, which Jepsen refers to as a "sour candy ending." The main instrument used is acoustic guitar.

== Music video ==
The music video for "Sour Candy" was shot in Vancouver, BC and directed by Ben Knechtel. It premiered December 16, 2009 and was uploaded to Jepsen's Vevo channel on July 5, 2011. It tells the story of two estranged lovers (played by Jepsen and Ramsay) in couples therapy.

== Chart performance ==
"Sour Candy" chart performance
Chart (2009)	Peak position
Canada Hot AC (Billboard)	36
