= Tug of War (Carly Rae Jepsen song) =

Single by Carly Rae Jepsen

from the album Tug of War
- Released: September 16, 2008
- Recorded: 2007–2008
- Length: 3:44 (album version); 3:19 (radio edit)
- Label: Carly Rae Music Inc.
- Songwriters: Carly Rae Jepsen; Ryan Stewart
- Producer: Ryan Stewart

Carly Rae Jepsen singles chronology
| "Tug of War" (2008) | "Bucket" (2009) |

Music video
- "Tug of War" on YouTube

"Tug of War" is the debut single by Canadian singer-songwriter Carly Rae Jepsen, released on 16 September 2008 as the lead single from her debut studio album, Tug of War. The song peaked at number 36 on the Canadian Hot 100.

== Music video ==
A music video for the song "Tug of War" was uploaded to Carly Rae Jepsen's Vevo channel on 13 July 2011 at a total length of three minutes and twenty-six seconds.

== Awards ==
In 2010, the song was nominated for a Canadian Radio Music Award for Song of the Year.

== Chart performance ==
"Tug of War" chart performance
| Chart (2008–10) | Peak position |
|---|---|
| Canada Hot 100 (Billboard) | 36 |
| Canada AC (Billboard) | 6 |
| Canada Hot AC (Billboard) | 12 |

== Certifications ==
| Region | Certification | Certified units/sales |
|---|---|---|
| Canada (Music Canada) | Gold | 20,000^{*} |
^{*} Sales figures based on certification alone.

== Release history ==
"Tug of War" release history
| Country | Date | Format | Label |
|---|---|---|---|
| Canada | 16 September 2008 | Digital download | Fontana; MapleMusic |
