= Andrew Allen (singer) =

Canadian singer-songwriter (born 1981)

- Born: May 6, 1981 (age 45)
- Occupations: Musician, singer, songwriter
- Years active: 2009–present

Andrew Allen (born 6 May 1981) is a Canadian singer-songwriter from Vernon, British Columbia. He has achieved success with top-ten singles on the Canadian Adult Contemporary charts, including "Loving You Tonight". He has also collaborated with other artists, including recording the song "Where Did We Go?" with Carly Rae Jepsen. Additionally, Allen records cover songs on his official YouTube channel.

== Background ==
Raised in British Columbia's Okanagan Valley, his acoustic pop/rock music is inspired by artists like Jason Mraz and Jack Johnson.

== Career ==
Allen had his first hit in 2009, when "I Wanna Be Your Christmas" reached the top ten in his native Canada. He was the feature performer for the Sochi 2014 hand off finale on the internationally broadcast closing ceremony of the 2010 Paralympic Winter Games held at Whistler, British Columbia. In 2010, Allen released his biggest single "Loving You Tonight", which sold more than 100,000 copies worldwide, and was featured on the Gold Selling NOW 37. He signed a record deal with Epic Records after spending much of that year on the road. "Loving You Tonight" was also featured on the soundtrack of the film Abduction starring Taylor Lautner.

== Collaborations ==
Andrew Allen has written songs with artists such as Meghan Trainor, Rachel Platten, Cody Simpson, Carly Rae Jepsen, Matt Simons, and Conrad Sewell. Numerous songs he has helped write have been released, including "Last Chance", which was featured on the Grammy-nominated album Atmosphere by Kaskade and Project 46; "Ad occhi chiusi", which was included on a double-platinum album by Italian artist Marco Mengoni; and "Maybe", released by pop artist Daniel Skye.

== Singles ==
- "I Wanna Be Your Christmas" (2009)
- "Loving You Tonight" (2010)
- "I Want You" (2011)
- "Where Did We Go?" (2012)
- "Satellite" (2012)
- "Play with Fire" (2013)
- "Thinking About You" (2014)
- "What You Wanted" (2016)
- "Favorite Christmas Song" (2017)
- "Maybe" (2017)

== Discography ==
- The Living Room Sessions (2008)
- Andrew Allen EP (2009)
- The Mix Tape (2012)
- Are We Cool? (2013)
- All Hearts Come Home (2014)
- The Writing Room (2020)
- 12:34 (2022; pre-released on vinyl in 2021)
