= Ryan Stewart (songwriter) =

- Genres: Pop; folk; country
- Occupations: Record producer; songwriter
- Website: ryanstewartsongs.com

Ryan Stewart is a Canadian record producer, songwriter, multi-instrumentalist and studio owner based out of Vancouver, British Columbia. He has worked with such artists Carly Rae Jepsen, Hedley, Simple Plan, Victoria Duffield, Tyler Shaw, Andrew Allen, Bif Naked, Cassie Dasilva, Matt Webb (Marianas Trench), FAANGS, Carmen & Camille and Laurell, among many others.

== Notable works ==
Year	Artist	Song	Chart Positions, Awards & Certifications	Credits
2020	Mike Ruby	"Burn Again"		Writer/Producer
2020	Mathew V & Jocelyn Alice	"Missing Me"		Writer/Producer
2019	Mike Ruby	"Close"		Writer/Producer
2019	Tep No (feat. Jocelyn Alice)	"Never Been Hurt Before"		Writer/Vocal Producer
2019	Mathew V	"Stay By You" & "Catching Feelings"		Writer/Producer
2018	Alan Walker ft. Trevor Guthrie	"Do It All For You"		Writer/Vocal Producer
2017	Hedley	"In Love With a Broken Heart" "All Night"	Album No. 1 on iTunes	Writer
2016	Carly Rae Jepsen	"Roses"		Writer/Producer
2016	Simple Plan	"Perfectly Perfect" & "PS I Hate You"	Album No. 4 on iTunes	Writer/Co-Producer
2016	Andrew Allen	"What You Wanted"	#15 hot AC	Writer/Producer
2015	Hedley	"Back to Basics", "Very First Time", "I Will" & "Alive"	Album No. 1 on iTunes, Certified Gold	Writer
2014	Bif Naked	"The Only One"		Writer
2013	Tyler Shaw	"By My Side"	Top 10 (Hot AC & AC)	Writer/Producer
2012	Carly Rae Jepsen/ Owl City	"Good Time"	Top 5 US Smash Single, Certified Platinum USA	Vocal producer (Carly)
2012	Carly Rae Jepsen	"Curiosity"	Platinum seller / Top 10 (Canada)	Writer/Producer
2012	Andrew Allen	"Where Did We Go"		Writer/Producer
2012	Victoria Duffield	"Break My Heart"	Top 15 Hot AC/CHR, Certified Platinum	Writer/Producer
2011	Victoria Duffield	"Shut Up and Dance"	No. 1 Much Music / No. 1 CDN Artist (Billboard All Radio Format) / #7 CHR / No. 1 Emerging Artist (9 weeks), Certified Platinum	Writer/Producer
2011	Andrew Allen	"I Want You"	Top 10 (AC) – Top 25 (Hot AC)	Writer/Producer
2011	Suzie McNeil	"Merry Go Round"	Top 10 (AC – 8 weeks)	Writer/Producer
2010	Andrew Allen	"Loving You Tonight"	Top 10 (AC – 20 weeks) Top 25 (USA Hot AC)	Producer
2010	Laurell	"Can't Stop Falling"	Top 10 (AC) Top 15 (Hot AC), WCMA Album of the Year	Writer/Producer
2009	Carmen & Camille	"Shine 4U"	Top 40 CHR / Top 60 USA Top 40 Radio	Writer/Producer
2008	Carly Rae Jepsen	"Tug of War" & "Bucket"	Top 10 (Hot AC & AC), Certified Gold	Writer/Producer
