= Phantoms (Marianas Trench album) =

Studio album by Marianas Trench
- Released: March 1, 2019
- Recorded: September 2018 – January 2019
- Studio: The Umbrella Factory, The Warehouse, Vancouver, BC
- Genre: Pop; pop rock; symphonic rock
- Length: 40:34
- Label: 604
- Producer: Josh Ramsay

Marianas Trench chronology
Astoria (2015)	Phantoms (2019)	Haven (2024)

Singles from Phantoms
- 1. "I Knew You When" Released: November 16, 2018; 2. "Only the Lonely Survive" Released: February 1, 2019; 3. "Glimmer" Released: May 31, 2019; 4. "Don't Miss Me?" Released: October 3, 2019

Phantoms is the fifth studio album released by Canadian rock band Marianas Trench. It was released on March 1, 2019, through 604 Records in Canada and Interscope Records internationally. The album saw another new style for the band, going for a more haunted and ghostly like sound as opposed to the more fantastical sound on their previous work, Astoria, which is where the title of Phantoms comes from.

== Background and recording ==
In 2015, Marianas Trench released their fourth studio album Astoria, with the lead single, "One Love", reaching number 50 on the Canadian Hot 100. Two other singles from the album followed: "This Means War" and "Who Do You Love". Marianas Trench performed at the New Year's celebration in Niagara Falls, Ontario in 2017. In the fall of 2017, the group released a new single titled "Rhythm of Your Heart". The song however, did not make the final cut on the album. On March 15, 2018, the music video for "Rhythm of Your Heart" premiered on YouTube.

On September 14, 2018, the group announced that they had begun working on their fifth studio album. The album was recorded at The Umbrella Factory and The Warehouse in Vancouver, British Columbia. The group finished production on the album in January 2019. Josh Ramsay spoke about the change in sound on the album stating;

"If you want longevity, then you keep reinventing, which we try to do on every record. Egos are real small in our band and nobody cares whose idea we go with as long as it's the best the song can be, and that's how we work. Hearing out everyone from the runner on the session bringing in sandwiches who suggests another bar added there is key to getting the best songs."

According to drummer Ian Casselman, time was the most challenging part of putting the album together. He stated that the group had a "deadline" to finish the album, however, "there's more put into it, from a production standpoint. The songs themselves aren't simple, there's lots of layers, lots of strings, lots of keys, and with any key sounds, there might be many different key sounds," as Casselman explains. In another interview with PopCrush, he stated that Ramsay made sure every verse and chorus had its own uniqueness so that it would be good enough to become a full song and be put on the album.

== Singles ==
On November 5, 2018, the band announced the lead single off their upcoming fifth album, "I Knew You When", which was later released on November 16. On December 3, 2018, the band announced the US Suspending Gravity Tour to promote their upcoming album Phantoms. The music video for "I Knew You When" was released on YouTube on December 19, 2018. On February 1, 2019, "Only the Lonely Survive" was released as the album's second single. On February 7, 2019, "Echoes of You" featuring Roger Joseph Manning Jr. was released digitally as a promotional single from the album. "Glimmer" was released for radio airplay on May 31, 2019, as the third single from the album. A music video for the song was released on June 5, 2019. "Don't Miss Me?" was released as the fourth and final single from the album on October 3, 2019.

== Concept and sound ==
Phantoms has been described by the band as being "haunted by the ghosts of former love." Ramsay said he wanted to use the haunted house concept as a metaphor for not being over a lost love and to "feel very human." He also added that the inspiration for the album was from Edgar Allan Poe. He describes the new record as "modern-song writing, but very organic, old-school approaches and trickery...done in a way that you haven't heard us do before." "It's about messy, real-life love with consequences; the kind of relationship that takes years to build," Ramsay sums up. "And Phantoms, I think, will allow people to connect on their own level, with their own story, to the ones that we're sharing." Bassist Mikey Ayley said the theme helped them find "some direction," in terms of music, visuals, concerts and lyricism. According to Casselman, the group decided on the title Phantoms when they were in New Orleans, citing the prominent death and voodoo culture in the area.

Musically, Ramsay stated the goal was to reinvent and make each album different from one another. He also described the album as "one story" and that each song is a chapter for him, as well as describing the growing tension that builds throughout the record resolving in a very cinematic and dramatic climax. Keeping the album "organic," the group used less programming and instead, emulated digital sounds by using string, organ and percussion instruments, experimenting with a harpsichord and Theremin, to capture elements of how "one would associate with haunted places."

== Promotion ==
Marianas Trench went on the Suspending Gravity Tour in support of the album starting in March 2019 in Canada and later in the United States during May and June of 2019. Elijah Woods x Jamie Fine supported the Canadian dates of the tour. They returned to the United States in the fall of 2019 for the second leg of the Suspending Gravity Tour. The group announced a European leg for November 2019. The band was supposed to go on a headlining tour in Australia beginning in April 2020, but due to the COVID-19 pandemic, it was postponed and moved to the fall of 2022.

== Reception ==
Phantoms has mostly received positive reviews from critics. Shannon Shumaker of The Prelude Press said "Each song on Phantoms stands alone as a masterpiece, and when combined, it makes for a very dramatic, exciting listen. Although the massive sounds on the album can sometimes feel a bit overwhelming, and the more energetic songs might sound a bit similar, it's the little stand-out moments throughout the album that make it special." Amanda Hather of Canadian Beats highlighted two songs on her review, praising the first track "Eleonora" for the harmonies that "pack a punch for the listener in the short minute it lasts." She also described the sixth track "Your Ghost" as "upbeat and fun to listen to." She ended her review stating, "This album is likely to propel their careers even further and allow them to reach milestones they haven't quite grasped yet." Christine Sloman of Melodic Magazine complimented the last track "The Killing Kind" stating, "Reminiscent of Queen's 'Bohemian Rhapsody' this song sounds like multiple songs in one... Each section is like organized chaos. They build onto each other, while staying central to a certain theme or idea."

=== Accolades ===
Accolades for Phantoms
Publication	Accolade	Year	Rank	Ref.
All Punked Up	Best Albums of 2019	2019	Unranked	

== Track listing ==
All tracks are written by Josh Ramsay.

No.	Title	Length
1.	"Eleonora"	1:08
2.	"Only the Lonely Survive"	3:43
3.	"Echoes of You" (featuring Roger Joseph Manning, Jr.)	5:18
4.	"Don't Miss Me?"	4:00
5.	"Wish You Were Here"	3:33
6.	"Your Ghost"	3:40
7.	"Glimmer"	3:41
8.	"I Knew You When"	3:45
9.	"The Death of Me"	5:00
10.	"The Killing Kind"	6:46
Total length:		40:34

== Personnel ==
Credits for Phantoms adapted from AllMusic.

Marianas Trench

- Josh Ramsay – vocals, guitar, piano, drums, bass, programming
- Matt Webb – guitar, vocals
- Mike Ayley – bass, vocals
- Ian Casselman – drums, percussion, vocals

Additional musicians

- Roger Manning – additional vocals
- Nik Pesut – drums

Production

- Josh Ramsay – producer, arrangement, composer, engineering, mixing
- Garnet Armstrong – art direction, design
- Julie Baldwin – management
- Zach Blackstone – engineering, assistant
- Ralph James - booking
- Ted Jensen – mastering
- Ivan Otis – photography
- Bennie and the Jets Ramsay – executive producer
- Dave Rave – mixing
- Jonathan Simkin – A&R, management
- David Sullivan-Kaplan – booking
- Karolina Turek – band photography
- Fred Webb – assistant

== Charts ==
Chart performance for Phantoms
Chart (2019)	Peak position
Australian Digital Albums (ARIA)	23
Canadian Albums (Billboard)	4
US Independent Albums (Billboard)	7
US Top Album Sales (Billboard)	38
