= Confidant (disambiguation) =

A confidant is a character in a story in whom the protagonist confides. It may also refer to:

- The Confidant, a Hong Kong TV series
- Confidant from the Batlló House, a piece of furniture
- "Confidant", a song by Mason Jennings from the 2000 album Birds Flying Away
- "Confidante", a song by Paul McCartney from the 2018 album Egypt Station

== See also ==
- Confident (disambiguation)
