= Riverside Secondary School (British Columbia) =

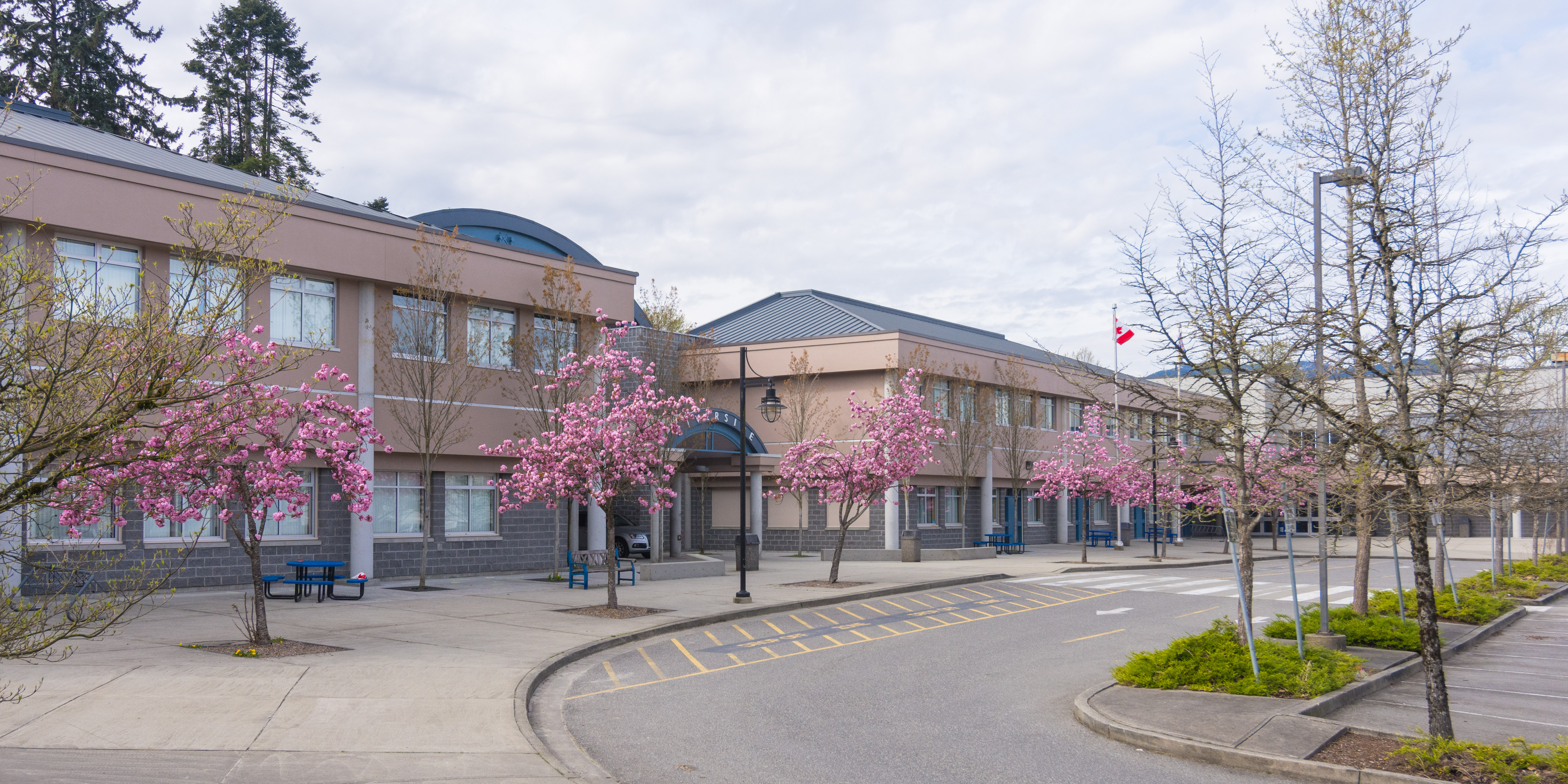

Location
- 2215 Reeve Street; Port Coquitlam, British Columbia, V3C 6K8; Canada; 49°15′22″N 122°47′21″W

Information
- School type: Public Secondary
- Founded: 1996
- School district: School District 43 Coquitlam
- Principal: Todd Clerkson
- Staff: 120
- Grades: 9 to 12
- Enrollment: 1390 (2024–25)
- Campus: Suburban
- Colours: Blue; Green; White
- Slogan: Expanding the Horizons of Opportunity
- Mascot: Rapid & Wave
- Website: www.sd43.bc.ca/Pages/default.aspx#/=
- Last updated: September 14th, 2024

Riverside Secondary School is a public coeducational secondary school located in Port Coquitlam, British Columbia, Canada. It enrolls approximately 1400 students from grades 9 to 12.

== General information ==
Riverside lies on the south side of Port Coquitlam, the location of which was formerly grassland. Established in 1996, the school colours are forest green, teal blue, white, and black. Its mascots are called the Rapid & Wave, and its logo was designed in 1996. The school has five portables as of 2002 to the present date.

Riverside offers French immersion, allowing students to receive an additional Dogwood BC high school diploma in French Immersion. Students are also given the opportunity to complete an examination for the Diplôme d'Études en Langue Française.

Riverside also offers honours-version courses in English 9–11, mathematics 9–10, and science 9–10. There is also a science co-op class offered to students in Grade 11.

In addition, Riverside offers a variety of clubs, sports teams, and volunteering opportunities to their students, which participate in many provincial and community events. Riverside also offers theatrical performances every year which have garnered awards both regionally and provincially for over the past decade..

In 2013, Riverside embarked on its 1:1 (one to one) initiative, asking every grade 9 student to bring a tablet or laptop to use at school for their learning. This BYOD program, plus the emphasis on students building a digital portfolio, is part of Riverside's goal to develop digital citizens prepared for the 21st Century.

== The Eddy ==
Riverside's newspaper is The Eddy. In 2013, the newspaper began to publish their content online and stopped printing physical papers. As part of Riverside's 1:1 initiative, an online newscast (The EddyCast) was launched. After 2 years, the EddyCast was renamed and relaunched as Rapid Fire.

Until 2019/2020, the Eddy was primarily run through the Journalism 10, 11, and 12 classes. However, due to changes in the BC Curriculum, the Eddy primarily takes contributions from students in New Media 10 and 11.

== Notable alumni ==
Name	Year Graduated	Notability	Notes
Kevin Lim	2001	Radio Host	Former KiSS RADiO host on the "Morning with Kevin and Sonia"
Brad West	2003	Mayor	Mayor of the City of Port Coquitlam
Zach Hamill	2006	Professional Hockey Player	Drafted eighth overall in the 2007 NHL Entry Draft by the Boston Bruins. Plays for IF Björklöven in Sweden's HockeyAllsvenskan
Tyler Shaw	2011	Singer/Songwriter	Best known for his single "Kiss Goodnight and winner at the 2012 MuchMusic Video Awards"
