= Something Old / Something New =

EP by Marianas Trench
- Released: May 26, 2015
- Recorded: 2001–2014
- Length: 14:58
- Label: 604; Cherrytree; Interscope
- Producer: Josh Ramsay

Marianas Trench chronology
Face the Music (2013)	Something Old / Something New (2015)	Astoria (2015)

Singles from Something Old / Something New
- 1. "Pop 101" Released: July 29, 2014; 2. "Here's to the Zeros" Released: December 25, 2014

Something Old / Something New is the third extended play recorded by Canadian rock group Marianas Trench, released May 26, 2015, through 604 Records, Cherrytree Records, and Interscope Records. It contains two songs originally recorded for the band's fourth studio album, Astoria (2015), and two tracks that pre-date the recording of their debut studio album, Fix Me (2006), from their Self-Titled EP Marianas Trench (2002). The EP was released in promotion of Astoria and serves as a "thank you" to their fans.

== Background ==
After wrapping up promotion of their previous studio album, Ever After (2011), in 2013, the group returned to the studio to work on new music. The release of "Pop 101" in July 2014, was intended as the beginning of the Astoria era and was followed up with a second single "Here's to the Zeros" that winter. However, when the band officially announced Astoria, they ultimately decided not to include either of these tracks, as they no longer fit the tone of the record. These singles were repackaged with two old tracks from before Fix Me (2006) and released as the Something Old / Something New EP, as bassist Mike Ayley said they didn't want the songs to "go to waste."

== Singles ==
"Pop 101" was released July 29, 2014, as the lead single for the EP, and the originally-announced lead single for the then-upcoming album, Astoria. Its music video premiered on MuchMusic on August 1, 2014, before being uploaded to their Vevo account on August 4. The song reached a peak position of 27 on the Canadian Hot 100 and was certified Platinum by Music Canada in March 2023.

The second single, "Here's to the Zeros", was released December 25, 2014. It reached number 57 on the Canadian Hot 100. The music video premiered on March 5, 2015, and was directed by Kyle Davison and Josh Ramsay. The song was certified Platinum by Music Canada in March 2023.

== Track listing ==
All tracks are written by Josh Ramsay.

No.	Title	Recorded for	Length
1.	"Pop 101" (featuring Anami Vice)	Astoria (Ended up on Something Old/Something New)	4:08
2.	"Primetime"	Marianas Trench (Self-Titled EP)	3:21
3.	"Here's to the Zeros"	Astoria (Ended up on Something Old/Something New)	3:50
4.	"Sicker Things"	Marianas Trench (Self-Titled EP)	3:39
Total length:			14:58

== Chart performance ==
=== Singles ===
Year	Single	Peak chart positions		
Year	Single	CAN	CAN CHR	CAN Hot AC
2014	"Pop 101"	27	22	11
2014	"Here's to the Zeros"	59	23	25
