= Rhythm of Your Heart =

Single by Marianas Trench
- Released: December 8, 2017
- Length: 3:34
- Label: 604
- Songwriter: Josh Ramsay
- Producer: Ramsay

Marianas Trench singles chronology
"Who Do You Love" (2016)	"Rhythm of Your Heart" (2017)	"I Knew You When" (2018)

Music video
- "Rhythm of Your Heart" on YouTube

"Rhythm of Your Heart" is a song by Canadian pop rock band Marianas Trench. It was released on December 8, 2017, as a non-album single, via 604 Records. A music video was released on March 15, 2018, in promotion of the single.

== Background ==
Without any formal announcement, "Rhythm of Your Heart" was released as a surprise single. The group first premiered the song in a form of a lyric video on December 7, 2017, through their YouTube channel and was officially released the following day for digital download. It was later issued to radio on December 21. According to drummer Ian Casselman, the song was released as "an interlude between albums," and was not expected to appear in their fifth studio album, Phantoms. Casselman also revealed in an interview with PopCrush that the song was originally an unfinished demo on Ramsay's computer. While looking for a certain song, he accidentally clicked the wrong one, which happened to be "Rhythm of Your Heart". Inspired by the track, he completed the song and decided to release it as a single.

== Composition ==
Written and produced by lead singer Josh Ramsay, the song has been described as "funky," different from their previously more pop-oriented songs. Ramsay said to the Vancouver Sun about what inspired the song stating, "if there is one thing I notice about a lot of writers is that they seem to write for the radio playlist and you find yourself not really listening. Then that one song that sounds completely different just explodes, like Gotye's 'Somebody That I Used to Know' did in the midst of all this light, dancey pop, and blows you away. That's the one I'm always trying to swing for, even if it's a lot harder to hit."

== Chart performance ==
"Rhythm of Your Heart" debuted at number 23 on the Canadian Digital Song Sales chart on the week ending December 30, 2017. The song also reached the Canada AC, Canada CHR/Top 40, and Canada Hot AC airplay charts at numbers 14, 39 and 9, respectively.

== Music video ==
The music video for "Rhythm of Your Heart" premiered via VEVO on March 15, 2018.

== Personnel ==
- Josh Ramsay – vocals, rhythm guitar, producer
- Matt Webb – lead guitar, backing vocals
- Mike Ayley – bass, backing vocals
- Ian Casselman – drums, backing vocals

== Charts ==
Chart performance for "Rhythm of Your Heart"
Chart (2017–18)	Peak position
Canadian Digital Song Sales (Billboard)	23
Canada AC (Billboard)	14
Canada CHR/Top 40 (Billboard)	39
Canada Hot AC (Billboard)	9
