= Pop 101 =

2014 single by Marianas Trench

Single by Marianas Trench featuring Anami Vice

from the album Something Old / Something New
- Released: July 29, 2014
- Genre: Pop
- Length: 4:14
- Label: 604; Cherrytree; Interscope
- Songwriter(s): Josh Ramsay
- Producer(s): Josh Ramsay

Marianas Trench singles chronology
"By Now" (2013)	"Pop 101" (2014)	"Here's to the Zeros" (2014)

Anami Vice singles chronology
"Tough Love" (2012)	"Pop 101" (2014)	"Tequila" (2014)

Music video
- "Pop 101" on YouTube

"Pop 101" is a song by Canadian pop rock band Marianas Trench, featuring hip hop artist Anami Vice. Written and produced by lead singer Josh Ramsay, it was released on July 29, 2014, through 604 Records, Cherrytree Records, and Interscope Records. Originally announced as the lead single off the band's forthcoming fourth studio album, Astoria (2015), the song was later scrapped from the album and serves only as a buzz single; it is also included on their 2015 extended play, Something Old / Something New. "Pop 101" entered the Canadian Hot 100 at No. 27, and was certified Platinum by Music Canada in March 2023.

== Background and release ==
"Pop 101" was released on July 29, 2014, as the intended lead single for their fourth studio album. However, the group decided not to include the song on the album, as it no longer fit the tone of the record, according to Josh Ramsay. Instead, it appeared on the band's Something Old / Something New EP, as bassist Mike Ayley said they didn't want the song to "go to waste."

== Composition ==
"Pop 101" is primarily a pop song with influences of pop rock, but also features allusions to hip hop, EDM, and folk music. The song is satirical in nature, scrutinizing the music industry and particularly the trends and clichés of modern pop music. Ryan McNutt of AUX.TV found the song to be "oddly compelling" given writer/producer Josh Ramsay's own formulaic work and success with "Call Me Maybe" (2011).

== Music video ==
The video for "Pop 101" was directed by Kyle Davison and parodies music video tropes and current trends of celebrity culture, including house parties, twerking and harems. It premiered August 1, 2014, exclusively on MuchMusic before being uploaded to the group's official VEVO page on August 4. The video was shot on May 24-25.

== Chart performance ==
"Pop 101" debuted at No. 27 on the Billboard Canadian Hot 100 on the chart dated August 16, 2014. The song also peaked at numbers 22 and 11, respectively, on the Canada CHR/Top 40 and Canada Hot AC airplay charts.

== Charts ==
Chart performance for "Pop 101"
Chart (2014)	Peak position
Canada (Canadian Hot 100)	27
Canada CHR/Top 40 (Billboard)	22
Canada Hot AC (Billboard)	11

== Certifications ==
Certifications for "Pop 101"
Region	Certification	Certified units/sales
Canada (Music Canada)	Platinum	80,000^{‡}
^{‡} Sales+streaming figures based on certification alone.
