= Confidence (disambiguation) =

Confidence means trust or faith in someone.

Confidence, confident, or overconfidence may also refer to:

== Concepts ==
- Confidence (politics), trust in government
- Confidence interval, a term used in statistical analysis
- Confidence trick (or confidence game, or "con"), intentionally misleading a person or persons for gain
- Consumer confidence, a measure of confidence in the economy
- Vote of confidence, a political step
- Analytic confidence, a term used in US government intelligence reports
- Overconfidence effect, a personal cognitive bias

== Arts, entertainment, and media ==
=== Films ===
- Confidence (1922 film), an American comedy film directed by Harry A. Pollard
- Confidence (1933 film), an American animated film featuring Oswald the Lucky Rabbit
- Confidence Girl {1952 film), an American crime film
- Confidence (1980 film), a Hungarian film nominated for the 1980 Academy Award for Best Foreign Language Film
- Confidence (2003 film), an American film starring Edward Burns, Dustin Hoffman and Rachel Weisz, and directed by James Foley

=== Literature ===
- Confidence (novel), by Henry James
- Confidence, a self-help-book by Alan Loy McGinnis
- The Confidence-Man, an 1857 novel by Herman Melville

=== Music ===
==== Albums ====
- Confident (album), a 2015 album by Demi Lovato
- Confidence (Gentleman album)
- Confidence (Narada Michael Walden album)
- Confidence (The Hoosiers album), 2023

==== Songs ====
- "Confident" (Justin Bieber song), a 2013 song by Justin Bieber featuring Chance the Rapper
- "Confident" (Demi Lovato song), a 2015 song by Demi Lovato
- "Confidence (Ocean Alley song)", a 2018 song by Ocean Alley
- Confidence (Sanctus Real song)
- "Confidence", a song by Chris Brown from Heartbreak on a Full Moon
- "Confidence", a song by X Ambassadors featuring K.Flay from Orion
- "Confident", a song by Sacha and Tyler Shaw, 2023
- "Confidence", a song written for a 1964 musical of The Secret Life of Walter Mitty and later used by the National Football League as theme music
- "Confidence", a song written by Roy C. Bennett and Sid Pepper, sung by Elvis Presley for the movie Clambake

== Places ==
- Confidence, California
- Confidence, Illinois
- Confidence, Iowa
- Confidence, West Virginia
