= Just Pretend =

Just Pretend may refer to:

- "Just Pretend" (Elvis Presley song), 1970
- "Just Pretend", a song by the Bens from their 2003 EP The Bens
- "Just Pretend (Bad Omens song)", 2022
- "Let's Just Pretend", a 1944 song by Jo Stafford. In 1998 it was included on her compilation album Walkin' My Baby Back Home.
- "Let's Just Pretend", a song by Tyler Shaw from his 2015 album Yesterday
