= Here's to the Zeros =

Single by Marianas Trench

from the EP Something Old / Something New
- Released: December 25, 2014
- Recorded: 2014
- Genre: Pop rock
- Length: 3:50
- Label: 604
- Songwriter(s): Josh Ramsay
- Producer(s): Josh Ramsay

Marianas Trench singles chronology
"Pop 101" (2014)	"Here's to the Zeros" (2014)	"One Love" (2015)

Music video
- "Here's to the Zeros" on YouTube

"Here's to the Zeros" is a song by Canadian pop rock group Marianas Trench. It is the second single released from their third EP Something Old / Something New on December 25, 2014, in Canada and the US. It was released internationally on December 29. The song peaked at number 57 on the Canadian Hot 100 chart and was certified platinum in 2023.

== Background and composition ==
"Here's to the Zeros" was originally intended to be released on their fourth album Astoria until Josh Ramsay confirmed on Twitter that the album would contain brand new songs and the track wouldn't appear on the album as it did not fit the tone. The song is a satirical track, poking fun at "catchy pop songs" in the form of a pop song. In an interview with MuchMusic, Ramsay spoke about the meaning behind the song and how it isn't possible to live a "perfect clean pop image."

"I came up with the lyrical concept right after attending the Grammy's for co-writing 'Call Me Maybe.' I felt a ton of internal and external pressure to come up with something as big. I felt like the industry was pushing for everyone to be these clean-cut pop types with no edge. I knew I would never be able to be that, so I decided to write something that went the exact opposite way. I open the song talking about getting arrested for drugs in high school and go from there, embracing all of my downfalls and, in fact, celebrating them. Besides, all those downfalls led me to exactly where I am today. No one can live up to the perfect clean pop image, nor should they have to."

== Awards and nominations ==
In 2015, the song was nominated for the MMVA Fan Fave Video.

== Music video ==
The music video premiered on March 5, 2015, and was directed by Kyle Davison and Josh Ramsay. It features the band dressed as Sesame Street characters and spoofing the TV show Mister Rogers' Neighborhood, with Josh Ramsay playing the role of Mr. Rogers.

== Charts ==
Chart performance for "Here's to the Zeros"
Chart (2015)	Peak position
Canada (Canadian Hot 100)	59
Canada CHR/Top 40 (Billboard)	23
Canada Hot AC (Billboard)	25

== Certifications ==
Certifications for "Here's to the Zeros"
Region	Certification	Certified units/sales
Canada (Music Canada)	Platinum	80,000^{‡}
^{‡} Sales+streaming figures based on certification alone.

== Release history ==
Release dates and formats for "Here's to the Zeros"
Region	Date	Format	Label	Ref.
Canada	December 25, 2014	Digital download	604	
United States	December 25, 2014	Digital download	604	
Various	December 29, 2014	Digital download	604	
