= I Knew You When =

I Knew You When may refer to:

- "I Knew You When" (Billy Joe Royal song), 1965
- I Knew You When (Marianas Trench song), 2018
- I Knew You When (album), a 2017 album by Bob Seger
- I Knew You When (Friday Night Lights), an episode of the TV series Friday Night Lights
