= Astoria (Marianas Trench album) =

Studio album by Marianas Trench
- Released: October 23, 2015
- Recorded: 2014–15
- Studios: The Umbrella Factory (Vancouver, BC); The Benhouse; The Warehouse Studio
- Genres: Pop; pop rock
- Length: 57:11
- Labels: 604; Cherrytree; Interscope
- Producer: Josh Ramsay

Marianas Trench chronology
Something Old / Something New (2015)	Astoria (2015)	Phantoms (2019)

Singles from Astoria
- 1. "One Love" Released: September 14, 2015; 2. "This Means War" Released: February 16, 2016; 3. "Who Do You Love" Released: September 8, 2016

Astoria is the fourth studio album recorded by Canadian rock band Marianas Trench. It was released on October 23, 2015, through 604 Records (in Canada) and Cherrytree Records and Interscope Records (internationally). The album represents the band's official return to the music scene after promotion of their previous album, Ever After (2011), ended in 2013, and was preceded by the retrospective EP, Something Old / Something New earlier in 2015.

== Background ==
In 2011, Marianas Trench released their third studio album, Ever After, which produced five top-50 singles, including lead single "Haven't Had Enough", which became the group's highest charting single to date (since the creation of the Billboard Canadian Hot 100 in 2007) at number 9. After releasing the last single from that era, "By Now", in 2013, the group returned to the studio to record their next album. During the promotion for Ever After, lead singer and songwriter, Josh Ramsay, also achieved mainstream success as a songwriter and producer on fellow Canadian Carly Rae Jepsen's No. 1 hit "Call Me Maybe" (2012). This helped pave the way for the band signing an American record deal with Cherrytree Records and promoting to a broader audience.

The group released "Pop 101" featuring hip hop artist Anami Vice on July 29, 2014, as the intended lead single for the then-unnamed fourth album. A second single, "Here's to the Zeros", was released in December 2014, with the full album expected the following spring (2015). The album's release was later pushed back to the fall. When the band officially announced Astoria, they ultimately decided not to include either of these tracks, as they no longer fit the tone of the record. Both of these buzz singles, along with two previously unreleased songs recorded before their debut album, Fix Me (2006), were instead released as a four-track extended play fittingly titled Something Old / Something New that was released on May 26, 2015.

The album was officially released on October 23, 2015, via 604 Records in Canada, and Cherrytree and Interscope Records internationally. The album peaked at number two on the Canadian Albums Chart.

== Composition and recording ==
The album was written during a time when Josh Ramsay was dealing with problems in his personal life. He made visits to the hospital to tenure for his mother's health, who was diagnosed with Lewy body dementia, and had broken up with his then-fiancé. However, Ramsay persevered and returned to the studio, with a goal of "getting back to writing." The material that transpired, became Astoria. Ramsay stated, "We took the hardest two years of my life and made it into something beautiful, and our best work to date." Musically, the group experiments with different sounds, such as the retro funk "Burning Up" to the '70s influenced "Shut Up and Kiss Me". Ramsay said the band spent three days capturing an INXS sound to the guitar part on "Burning Up", as it was "important for the song." They used various chorus pedals, a vintage Roland Jazz Chorus amp, a Marshall amp and a Vox AC30 amp. Ramsay stated that they avoided using any guitars or amps that were made after the '80s, explaining, "All the guitars were my old ones, and then we used practical synths. I used an old MiniMoog, old Yamaha stuff; all the analog synths are practical and real. The only problem was that you couldn't really recall a sound, so you have to go with it as you have it. The output sounds different an hour later." On the third track "Yesterday", it features a horn section and has been described as a neon-'80s synth song. The eighth track, "Dearly Departed" references eleven previous Marianas Trench songs from their earlier records. The last track, "End of an Era" is described as a Queen-inspired hard rock track, which bassist Mike Ayley said is an emotional track with a "long tense buildup and a big payoff."

The Vancouver Film Orchestra provided strings on the album, performing on five tracks that are interludes. Ramsay explained the concept behind the title track, stating that he wanted "symphony style songs to open the record." The group blended vintage instruments and synthesizers so that "each section sounded like a different band." The album was produced by Josh Ramsay and was recorded at The Umbrella Factory, The Benhouse and The Warehouse Studio in Vancouver, BC. Most of the drums were recorded at The Umbrella Factory, with the exception of "Who Do You Love", which was recorded at The Warehouse Studio and features a 10-man drum ensemble. Ramsay explained that it was inspired after he watched a behind the scenes feature of Hans Zimmer doing the score to Man of Steel, who brought in a bunch of drummers and had them improvising together. A video was uploaded to their official Vevo channel regarding the making of the album.

== Concept ==
Similar to their previous two albums (2009's Masterpiece Theatre and 2011's Ever After), Astoria is conceived as a loose concept album, with a cohesive theme and transition tracks bridging the individual songs composing the album. According to Ramsay, this album is inspired by 1980s fantasy and adventure films, and The Goonies (1985) in particular. That film inspired the title (as it was set in Astoria, Oregon), the album's artwork, as well as the title of their accompanying US tour (Hey You Guys!!).

== Promotion ==
Marianas Trench headlined a total of 5 tours across the US, Canada and Europe, in support of the album.

US

The band toured the US (as well as two dates in Québec) on the Hey You Guys!! Tour with Mainland (November 3, 2015 - February 14, 2016) and the SPF 80's Tour with Skylar Stecker (July 8 - August 14, 2016).

Canada

The band toured Canada on the Never Say Die Tour with Walk off the Earth (March 9 - April 8, 2016), as well as The Last Crusade Tour with Shawn Hook (November 3, 2016 - February 12, 2017).

Europe

The band toured Europe on the Final Countdown Tour with Club Drive (May 1-23, 2017).

== Singles ==
"One Love" was released on September 14, 2015, as the official lead single for the album. It peaked at number 50 on the Canadian Hot 100. The song also peaked at numbers 14, 20, and 16, respectively, on the Canada AC, Canada CHR/Top 40, and Canada Hot AC airplay charts. The song has been described by critics as more pop than the group's earlier music and has also been favorably compared to previous ballad singles "Good to You" and "Fallout". "One Love" was serviced to American hot adult contemporary radio through 604 Records on November 9, 2015. The song reached number 35 on the US Adult Top 40 airplay chart.

A second official single, "This Means War", was serviced to Canadian radio on February 16, 2016. It was the group's first single to not enter the Canadian Hot 100, but charted on the Canada AC, Canada CHR/Top 40, and Canada Hot AC airplay charts at numbers 38, 37 and 38, respectively. On May 20, the group released a music video for the song.

"Who Do You Love" was released as the third official single on September 8, 2016. A music video for the song was released on October 10. The song peaked at number 56 on the Canadian Hot 100, as well as the Canada AC at number 15, Canada CHR/Top 40 at number 31, and Canada Hot AC at number 9.

=== Promotional singles ===
The thirteenth track, "Wildfire", was released to iTunes on October 2, 2015, as a promotional single supporting pre-orders of the album.

=== Other songs ===
On July 21, 2017, the group premiered a live music video for "Shut Up and Kiss Me", via VEVO. On October 24, 2017, a music video for "Astoria" was released. Directed by Emma Higgins, it was shot in Oregon and Vancouver.

== Critical reception ==
Professional ratings
Review scores
Source	Rating
AllMusic	3.5/5 stars
Alternative Addiction	3.5/5 stars
Melodic	5/5 stars
PopMatters	7/10 stars
Sputnikmusic	3.5/5 stars
The Music Express	5/5 stars

The album was met with positive reviews from music critics. Timothy Monger of AllMusic stated, "Musically, they still fall somewhere between the anthemic pop-punk of Fall Out Boy and the slick, funky pop of Maroon 5, but their occasional Queen-like vocal aspirations and determination to quote about a dozen different '80s hits within the album's context makes Astoria a pretty entertaining ride." Though he praised the orchestral arrangement, he criticized the overall length of the album which he said "feel about five songs too long." Alternative Addiction remarked, "Josh Ramsay's vocal on the album is exceptional again too. He might go to the falsetto a touch too much here, but it's still a vocal performance that's highly entertaining to listen to." Nick Anastasia of Melodic rewarded the album a 5-star rating, writing, "For a band to release three nearly perfect albums back to back is no easy accomplishment, yet somehow Marianas Trench accomplished that. Astoria is, simply put, brilliant." Dustin Ragucos of PopMatters said the album was for "those who've imagined countless adventures through the band's rock opera-inspired albums." Sputnikmusic said the record was "not a bad album at all. Even some of the tunes that borrow heavily from other sources, contain their own catchy melodies and the band's knack for quirky and interesting song-writing. It's just that the game of 'where have I heard that before' is so over-bearingly disconcerting throughout the LP's fifty-seven minute duration, that it becomes tough to fully appreciate the songs on their own merits." Keith Sharp of The Music Express praised the production on the album, writing, "Ramsey and fellow band mates; guitarist Matt Webb, bassist Mike Ayley and drummer Ian Cassellman are going against the production grain and have created an ambitious musical statement."

== Awards and nominations ==
Awards and nominations for Astoria
Year	Organization	Award	Result	Ref(s)
2017	Juno Awards	Pop Album of the Year	Nominated	

== Track listing ==
All music and lyrics by Josh Ramsay.

No.	Title	Length
1.	"Astoria"	6:57
2.	"Burning Up"	4:05
3.	"Yesterday"	4:14
4.	"One Love"	4:01
5.	"August Burns Red"	0:46
6.	"This Means War"	3:24
7.	"Hospital Bells"	0:38
8.	"Dearly Departed"	4:19
9.	"Hollywood Renaissance"	1:08
10.	"Shut Up and Kiss Me"	3:12
11.	"Who Do You Love"	3:52
12.	"Never Say Die"	0:29
13.	"Wildfire"	4:04
14.	"While We're Young"	4:00
15.	"Forget Me Not"	3:48
16.	"And Straight On Til Morning"	0:34
17.	"End of an Era"	7:40
Total length:		57:11

== Personnel ==
Personnel per booklet.

Marianas Trench

- Josh Ramsay – vocals, guitar, piano, drums, bass, programming, string arrangement
- Matt Webb – guitar, piano, vocals
- Mike Ayley – bass, vocals
- Ian Casselman – drums, percussion, vocals

Additional musicians

- Dave Genn – guitar and Hammond organ on "Astoria"
- Morgan Hempstead – vocals on "Astoria" and "End of an Era"
- Roger Joseph Manning Jr. – vocals on "Astoria"
- Steve Marshall – vocals on "Astoria"
- Craig Northey – vocals on "Astoria" and "End of an Era"
- Sara Ramsay – vocals on "Astoria"
- Royce Whittaker – guitar on "Astoria"
- Bennie Ramsay – aux percussion and foot steps on "Astoria"
- "Yesterday" horn players:

- Mike Allen
- Kristy-Lee Audette
- Dominic Conway
- Jocelyn Waugh
- Ian Weiss

- "Shut Up and Kiss Me" The Marian-ettes:

- Rachel Ashmore
- Aiden Farrell
- Jessica Lee
- Natasha Pheko
- Cat Thomson

- "Who Do You Love" drummers:

- Peter Barone
- Flavio Cirillo
- Pedro Dzelme
- Alex Glassford
- Christopher Hockey
- Nik Pesut
- Paul Townsend
- Shane Wilson

- Brett Jamieson – guitar on "End of an Era"
- Dave "Rave" Ogilvie – additional synthesizers
- Colin Janz – additional synthesizers
- The Vancouver Film Orchestra – strings
- Hal Beckett – conductor

Production

- Josh Ramsay – producer, engineer, mixing
- Bennie and the Jets Ramsay - executive producer
- Kyle – assistant to executive producer
- Zach Blackstone – engineer, mixing assistant
- Kurtis S. Maas – engineer assistant
- Nik Pesut – drum tech, additional editing
- Shane Wilson – drum tech
- Roger Monk – engineer on strings
- Dave Ogilvie – mixing
- Satoshi Mark Noguchi – orchestra mixing
- Ted Jensen – mastering
- Garnet Armstrong – art direction, design
- Ivan Otis – photography, base photography
- Naeim Khavari – illustration, paint overs

== Charts ==
Chart performance for Astoria
Chart (2015)	Peak position
Australian Albums (ARIA)	56
Canadian Albums (Billboard)	2
US Billboard 200	53

== Certifications and sales ==
Certifications and sales for Astoria
Region	Certification	Certified units/sales
Canada (Music Canada)	Platinum	80,000^{‡}
^{‡} Sales+streaming figures based on certification alone.
