= I Knew You When (Marianas Trench song) =

Single by Marianas Trench

from the album Phantoms
- Released: November 16, 2018
- Genre: Dance pop; pop rock
- Length: 3:42
- Label: 604
- Songwriter(s): Josh Ramsay
- Producer(s): Ramsay

Marianas Trench singles chronology
"Rhythm of Your Heart" (2017)	"I Knew You When" (2018)	"Glimmer" (2019)

Music video
- "I Knew You When" on YouTube

"I Knew You When" is a song by Canadian pop rock band Marianas Trench. It was released on November 16, 2018, as their first single from their fifth studio album Phantoms. The song was accompanied by its music video released in December 2018. It reached within the top 30 on the Canada CHR/Top 40 and Canada Hot AC airplay charts.

== Composition and lyrics ==
The band announced a new single titled "I Knew You When" would be coming and teased a preview via social media on November 5, 2018. The track has been described as a dance-oriented and pop rock song, highlighting the band's musical growth. Lead singer Josh Ramsay spoke to Substream Magazine on the meaning behind the song.

"This is about long term, messy, real life love. Love with consequence. Not about drunken lust, or doing shots in a bar, or 'living life for just tonight,' but the kind of real-life relationship that takes a decade to build, through ups and downs. If I've learned one thing in my life as a performer it's this; if you're going to sing a song every night for the rest of your career, you better mean it – and I do."

Ramsay wrote and produced the track. The song runs at 106 BPM and is in the key of E major.

== Music video ==
The music video for "I Knew You When" was released on YouTube on December 19, 2018, and was directed by Kyle Davison.

== Personnel ==
Credits for "I Knew You When" adapted from album's liner notes.

Marianas Trench

- Josh Ramsay – vocals, rhythm guitar
- Matt Webb – lead guitar, backing vocals
- Mike Ayley – bass, backing vocals
- Ian Casselman – drums, backing vocals

Production

- Josh Ramsay – producer, arrangement, engineering, mixing
- Zach Blackstone – assistant engineering
- Ted Jensen – mastering
- Dave Rave – mixing

== Charts ==
Chart performance for "I Knew You When"
Chart (2018−19)	Peak position
Canadian Digital Song Sales (Billboard)	18
Canada AC (Billboard)	33
Canada CHR/Top 40 (Billboard)	27
Canada Hot AC (Billboard)	21
