= Bringing Out the Best in People =

1985 book about leadership by Alan Loy McGinnis

- Author: Alan Loy McGinnis
- Publication date: 1985
- ISBN: 0-8066-4800-7

Bringing Out the Best in People (How to Enjoy Helping Others Excel) (ISBN 0-8066-4800-7) is a book by Alan Loy McGinnis and published in 1985. It describes 12 rules that a leader should follow to motivate team members.

The book has been used frequently by people new to a supervisory or management position, with the main purpose being to help other people to lead and bring out the best in people. It was originally published in May 1985, and a 20th-anniversary edition was published in 2005.

== Reviews ==
- "Book Review: Bringing Out the Best in People". Process Design Consultants Inc. 2011-10-25.
