= Walkin' My Baby Back Home =

Walkin' My Baby Back Home may refer to:

- "Walkin' My Baby Back Home" (song), a popular 1931 song recorded by Nat King Cole among others
- Walkin' My Baby Back Home, a 2003 album, including the song of the same name, recorded by Johnnie Ray
- Walkin' My Baby Back Home (Jo Stafford album), a 1998 album by Jo Stafford
- Walking My Baby Back Home (film), a 1953 film starring Donald O'Connor
