= Kiss Goodnight =

Single by Tyler Shaw

from the album Yesterday
- Released: December 4, 2012
- Recorded: 2012
- Genre: Pop; pop rock
- Length: 3:45
- Label: Sony Music Canada
- Songwriter(s): Tyler Shaw; Stephen Kozmeniuk; Todd Clark
- Producer(s): Stephen Kozmeniuk; Zubin Thakkar

Tyler Shaw singles chronology
"Kiss Goodnight" (2012)	"By My Side" (2013)

"Kiss Goodnight" is the debut single released by Canadian singer-songwriter Tyler Shaw. The song was written by Shaw in conjunction with Stephen Kozmeniuk and Todd Clark, and was produced by Kozmeniuk and Zubin Thakkar. It was released December 4, 2012 through Sony Music Canada as Shaw's first official single following his win of the second Coca-Cola MuchMusic Covers Contest (2012) and serves as the lead single for Shaw's debut studio album, Yesterday (2015). A franglais version featuring vocals by french pop artist Nathalie Noël, entitled "Je veux juste rester là" ("I Just Want to Stay There"), was released April 9, 2013.

== Commercial reception ==
"Kiss Goodnight" debuted at number 100 on the Billboard Canadian Hot 100 for the week of January 19, 2013. It entered the top forty (at number 39) in its fourth week on the chart dated February 9, 2013 and reached a peak position of 24 on the chart dated May 18, 2013. The single was certified Gold by Music Canada on April 22, 2013, indicating sales of over 40,000 units. As of September 2015, "Kiss Goodnight" has sold over 73,000 units, according to Shaw's label, Sony Music Entertainment.

The song received significant airplay on pop and adult radio formats in early 2013 and resultantly charted on multiple airplay charts compiled by Billboard via Nielsen BDS Radio. "Kiss Goodnight" spent seventeen weeks in the Top 10 on Canadian adult contemporary radio and reached a peak position of 5 on the associated Canada AC chart; it also peaked at number eighteen on the Canada CHR/Top 40 chart and at number 7 on the Canada Hot AC chart. It was the 23rd most-played song on Canadian radio between January 2001 and July 2015, according to data compiled by Nielsen SoundScan.

== Music video ==
The official music video for "Kiss Goodnight" was directed by Marc Andre Debruyne and premiered through MuchMusic December 14, 2012 before becoming publicly available December 17, 2012. It was funded by MuchFACT, a collaborative venture between FACTOR and MuchMusic. In the video, Shaw and his friends break into an abandoned house in the woods, where they engage in a campfire-style singalong and later illuminate the house with strings of Christmas lights.

The video was nominated for the MuchFACT Video of the Year award at the 2013 MuchMusic Video Awards, but lost to Classified's "Inner Ninja".

== Charts and certifications ==
=== Weekly charts ===
Chart (2012–13)	Peak position
Canada (Canadian Hot 100)	24
Canada AC (Billboard)	5
Canada CHR/Top 40 (Billboard)	18
Canada Hot AC (Billboard)	7

=== Year-end charts ===
Chart (2013)	Peak position
Canada (Canadian Hot 100)	57

=== Certifications ===
Region	Certification	Certified units/sales
Canada (Music Canada)	Platinum	80,000

== Awards and nominations ==
Year	Ceremony	Category/Award	Result
2013	MuchMusic Video Awards	MuchFACT Video of the Year	Nominated
2014	Canadian Radio Music Awards	Best New Group or Solo Artist: Mainstream AC	Nominated
2014	Canadian Radio Music Awards	Best New Group or Solo Artist: Hot AC	Nominated
2014	Canadian Radio Music Awards	Best New Group or Solo Artist: CHR	Nominated
2014	Canadian Radio Music Awards	Best New Group or Solo Artist: Dance/Urban/Rhythmic	Nominated
2014	SOCAN Awards	Songwriting Honours (Pop/Rock)	Won
