= Yesterday (album) =

Studio album by Tyler Shaw
- Released: September 4, 2015
- Recorded: 2012–15 Various locations: Cookstown, ON; Toronto, ON; Los Angeles, CA; Vancouver, BC
- Genre: Pop; pop rock; R&B; folk pop
- Length: 45:05
- Label: Tyler Ip / Sony Music Canada

Singles from Yesterday
- 1. "Kiss Goodnight" Released: December 4, 2012; 2. "By My Side" Released: June 18, 2013; 3. "It Happens All the Time" Released: July 22, 2014; 4. "House of Cards" Released: February 9, 2015; 5. "Dizzy" Released: August 14, 2015; 6. "Wicked" Released: January 8, 2016

Yesterday is the debut studio album recorded by Canadian singer-songwriter Tyler Shaw, released September 4, 2015 through Tyler Ip, a label imprint of Sony Music Canada. It was preceded by the release of four singles between 2012 and 2015, including the Gold-certified lead single, "Kiss Goodnight". Shaw co-wrote twelve of the thirteen songs, including all four of the aforementioned singles.

== Background ==
In February 2012, Shaw entered the second annual MuchMusic and Coca-Cola Covers contest with a cover of Hedley's then-recent hit "Invincible". He was later crowned the winner at the 2012 MuchMusic Video Awards, which took place June 17, 2012, out of over 1300 applicants. As part of his prize, Shaw was signed to Sony Music Canada to record an original song and received support from MuchFACT - a collaborative venture between FACTOR and MuchMusic - to shoot an accompanying music video. His debut single, "Kiss Goodnight," was released December 4, 2012 and eventually peaked at number 25 on the Billboard Canadian Hot 100. Shaw continued writing and recording for Yesterday between 2012 and 2015. He revealed in an interview with independent music blog ASAP Music that most of the songs relate to love and that his motivation was to write songs that "speak to [the listener]."

The album became available for pre-order July 31, 2015 and was released through Tyler Ip / Sony Music Canada September 4, 2015.

== Promotion ==
=== Singles ===
"Kiss Goodnight" serves as the album's lead single and was released December 4, 2012. The music video, directed by Marc Andre Debruyne, premiered December 14, 2012 and was nominated for MuchFACT Video of the Year award at the 2013 MuchMusic Video Awards. The song achieved commercial success, ranking at number 24 on the Billboard Canadian Hot 100 and receiving significant airplay on multiple pop and adult radio formats, in addition to being certified Gold by Music Canada. "Kiss Goodnight" was the 23rd most-played song on Canadian radio between January 2001 and July 2015, according to data compiled by Nielsen SoundScan.

The album's second single, "By My Side," was released June 18, 2013. It reached number 34 on the Canadian Hot 100 and the top 10 on the Canada AC chart.

On July 22, 2014, "It Happens All the Time" was released as the album's third single. Failing to match the commercial success of its predecessors, the song peaked at 94 on the Canadian Hot 100, and received only moderate airplay on adult contemporary and hot adult contemporary formats.

"House of Cards" was released February 9, 2015 as the album's fourth official single. This song reached the top 15 on multiple airplay formats, becoming Shaw's biggest pop radio hit to date, and has so far reached a peak position of 37 on the Canadian Hot 100.

"Dizzy" was released to digital retailers on August 14, 2015 to support pre-orders as the album's second promotional single. It also serves as the album's fifth radio single, impacting contemporary hit and hot adult contemporary formats on August 17, 2015.

A sixth single, "Wicked", was serviced to radio on January 7, 2016. A new, acoustic version of the song was released to digital retailers on January 8, 2016.

=== Other songs ===
The album's ninth track, "Showtime," served as the theme song for the 2014 FIFA U-20 Women's World Cup. It was released July 29, 2014 as the first promotional single from the album.

== Track listing ==
No.	Title	Writer(s)	Producer(s)	Length
1.	"Wicked"	Tyler Shaw; Ryan Kowarsky; Alex "Pilzbury" Vujic	Kowarsky; Pilzbury	3:25
2.	"It Happens All the Time"	Shaw; Richard John Harris; Simon Katz	Katz	3:31
3.	"Dizzy"	Shaw; Rob Wells; Shobha Lee	Wells	2:33
4.	"Life Without You"	Shaw; Todd Clark; Stephen Kozmeniuk	Kozmeniuk; Clark	3:36
5.	"House of Cards"	Shaw; Vujic; Dan Talevski	Pilzbury	3:32
6.	"One Wish"	Shaw; Adam King; Joel Stouffer	AuPt	3:05
7.	"Yesterday"	Shaw; Clark; Gavin Slate	Ryan Stewart	3:23
8.	"By My Side" (Remastered)	Shaw; Stewart	Stewart	3:37
9.	"Showtime"	Shaw; Vujic; Talevski	Pilzbury	3:10
10.	"Don't Be"	Shaw; Jaden Michaels; Colin Munroe	Munroe	3:56
11.	"Kiss Goodnight"	Shaw; Kozmeniuk; Clark	Kozmeniuk; Zubin Thakkar	3:44
12.	"Criminal"	Shaw; Clark; Slate	Kozmeniuk; Clark	3:23
13.	"Let's Just Pretend"	Matthew Tishler; Ava Kay	Tishler	4:10
Total length:				45:05

== Chart performance ==
=== Singles ===
Year	Single	Peak positions				Certifications
Year	Single	CAN	CAN AC	CAN CHR	CAN Hot AC	Certifications
2012	"Kiss Goodnight"	24	5	18	7	CAN: Plantinum
2013	"By My Side"	34	9	28	12	
2014	"It Happens All the Time"	94	21	48	31	
2015	"House of Cards"	37	11	12	10	CAN: Gold
2015	"Dizzy"	—	—	33	41	
2016	"Wicked"	51	13	13	6	
"—" denotes releases that did not chart
