= Who Do You Love (Marianas Trench song) =

Single by Marianas Trench

from the album Astoria
- Released: September 8, 2016
- Genre: Pop rock
- Length: 3:52
- Label: 604
- Songwriter(s): Josh Ramsay
- Producer(s): Josh Ramsay

Marianas Trench singles chronology
"This Means War" (2016)	"Who Do You Love" (2016)	"Rhythm of Your Heart" (2017)

Music video
- "Who Do You Love" on YouTube

"Who Do You Love" (stylized as "Who Do You Love?") is a song recorded by Canadian pop rock group Marianas Trench for their fourth studio album, Astoria (2015). The song was written and produced by lead singer Josh Ramsay. "Who Do You Love" was released through 604 Records on September 8, 2016 as the record's third and final official single.

== Composition and recording ==
"Who Do You Love" was written and produced by Josh Ramsay. The song is about the desire to become a better person for the one you love. Drums were recorded at The Warehouse Studio and features a 10-man drum ensemble. Ramsay explained that it was inspired after he watched a behind the scenes feature of Hans Zimmer doing the score to Man of Steel, who brought in a bunch of drummers and had them improvising together.

== Promotion ==
The band released a lyric video for "Who Do You Love" on September 7, 2016, when the song was announced as a single.

== Chart performance ==
"Who Do You Love" debuted at number 99 on the Billboard Canadian Hot 100 chart dated December 3, 2016. It has since reached a peak position of 56, on the chart dated February 11, 2017. The song also peaked at number 50 on the Hot Canadian Digital Songs component chart. "Who Do You Love" has become the group's most successful single at adult contemporary radio, reaching peak positions of 15 and 9 on the Canada AC and Canada Hot AC airplay charts, respectively. These positions represent the group's highest peak on either chart since Billboard implemented them in late 2012. The song also reached a peak position of 31 on the Canada CHR/Top 40 chart.

== Music video ==
The official music video for "Who Do You Love" premiered on October 10, 2016. It was produced by Mad Ruk Entertainment and took three days to film. In lieu of a conventional video shoot, the group opted to direct the clip's $50,000 budget towards charitable endeavours, in keeping with the "vibe" of the song. A camera crew followed the four members around Vancouver, British Columbia as they performed random acts of kindness, contributed towards a school's music program, and spent time with their families. According to drummer Ian Casselman, they were "trying to inspire people to do good things," with this video and thus ended it with the song's title displayed across the screen with the word "you" italicized for emphasis.

== Charts ==
=== Weekly charts ===
Weekly chart performance for "Who Do You Love"
Chart (2016–17)	Peak position
Canada (Canadian Hot 100)	56
Canada AC (Billboard)	15
Canada CHR/Top 40 (Billboard)	31
Canada Hot AC (Billboard)	9

=== Year-end charts ===
Year-end chart performance for "Who Do You Love"
Chart (2017)	Position
Canada AC (Mediabase)	10
Canada Hot AC (Mediabase)	27

== Certifications ==
Certifications and sales for "Who Do You Love"
Region	Certification	Certified units/sales
Canada (Music Canada)	2× Platinum	160,000^{‡}
^{‡} Sales+streaming figures based on certification alone.
