= Confidant from the Batlló House =

Furniture piece designed by Antoni Gaudí

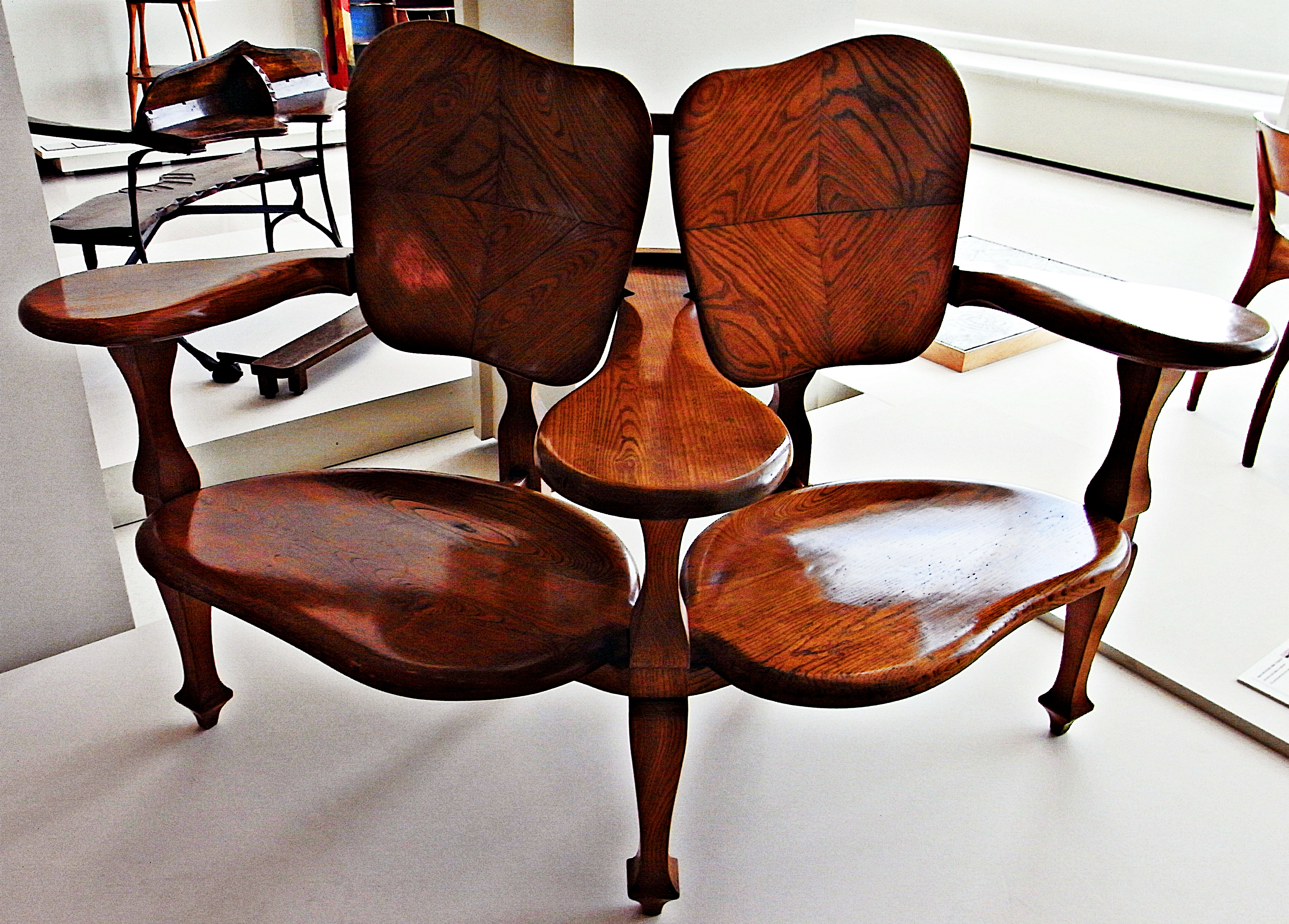
- Artist: Antoni Gaudí
- Year: 1904-1906
- Type: ash wood
- Dimensions: 104.5 cm × 167 cm × 75.5 cm (41.1 in × 66 in × 29.7 in)
- Location: Museu Nacional d'Art de Catalunya, Barcelona

The Confidant from Casa Batlló, also known as the Double Sofa or Banc de dues places (Two-seater bench), is a furniture piece designed by Antoni Gaudí. Originally designed for the dining room of Casa Batlló on Barcelona's Passeig de Gràcia, the chair is currently exhibited in the Modern Art collection of the Museu Nacional d'Art de Catalunya and at Gaudí House Museum in Barcelona. Replicas are displayed at the Gaudí-designed Casa Batlló and Casa Milà (La Pedrera).

== Description ==
Despite being described as a bench, the confidant is in fact composed of several pieces and does not resemble the classic linear bench with a single solid seat. Instead, two individual seats are divided by a shared central armrest, and each seat is slightly angled away from the armrest. Because of the angled seats, the confidant has three legs in the front, with the center front leg shared by both seats, but only two legs in the back. Constructed in ash wood in the Casas i Bardés workshops, the curved, organic shapes of the confidant's seats and backrests are meant to mimic the shape of the seated person's body, and the lack of ornamentation highlights the natural grain and texture of the wood.

== Antoni Gaudí ==
Antoni Gaudí (25 June 1852 – 10 June 1926) was a Spanish Catalan architect and figurehead of Catalan Modernism. Gaudí's works reflect his highly individual and distinctive style and are largely concentrated in the Catalan capital of Barcelona, notably his magnum opus, the Sagrada Família.

Much of Gaudí's work was marked by his four life passions: architecture, nature, religion and love for Catalonia. Gaudí studied every detail of his creations, integrating into his architecture a series of crafts in which he was skilled: ceramics, stained glass, wrought ironwork forging and carpentry. He introduced new techniques in the treatment of materials, such as trencadís, made of waste ceramic pieces.

After a few years under the influence of neo-Gothic art and Oriental techniques, Gaudí became part of the Catalan Modernista movement which was reaching its peak in the late 19th and early 20th centuries. His work transcended mainstream Modernisme, culminating in an organic style inspired by nature. Gaudí rarely drew detailed plans of his works, instead preferring to create them as three-dimensional scale models and molding the details as he was conceiving them.

Gaudí’s work enjoys widespread international appeal and many studies are devoted to understanding his architecture. Today, his work finds admirers among architects and the general public alike. His masterpiece, the still-uncompleted Sagrada Família, is one of the most visited monuments in Spain. Between 1984 and 2005, seven of his works were declared World Heritage Sites by UNESCO. Gaudí’s Roman Catholic faith intensified during his life and religious images permeate his work. This earned him the nickname "God's Architect" and led to calls for his beatification.

== Gaudí's furniture design ==
Though Gaudí is known primarily as an architect, he often applied his design skills to the furniture and interior decorations of the homes and buildings he renovated or constructed, such as "cupboards, tables, seats of every kind, priedieus, screens, mirrors, windows, doors, door knobs and handles, grilled, and spyholes for identifying a visitor before opening the door." He was known for his high attention to detail in his architectural works, continually checking and modifying his plans even as the buildings were being constructed, and he gave this same level of attention to his furniture design, insisting that furniture must be specific to its space, its function, and the needs of the client. As with his building designs, his furniture designs underwent constant studying, testing, and adjustment before being installed. Most importantly, Gaudí aimed for what he called the "idea," the harmony between the furniture's elements and of its "functionality, form, symbolism, structure, and especially construction." He said that "for an object to be attractive its first quality must be that it fulfills the purpose for which it is intended," a sentiment that suggests the ideals of modern industrial design.

Gaudí’s early furniture designs mimicked existing popular or historic styles, but as he sought to make a more personal statement, he soon found inspiration in nature and its organic, curved lines and shapes, resulting in highly ergonomic designs. As with his architecture, Gaudí made three-dimensional clay and plaster models of his furniture, allowing him to create organic shapes with malleable material. For Palau Güell (1884-1887), Gaudí's furniture design style was still rather traditional, though he did create some curved, asymmetrical pieces, and he also sought to mix styles of furniture even within the same room, desiring to create a level of "disorder."

By the time he was designing furniture for Casa Calvet (1898-1899), Gaudí was creating "fluid and abstract" designs that would bring out the grain, texture, and color of the wood but also produce "clarity of structure and cleanliness of construction." Constructed of oak in the Casas i Bardés workshops, the pieces— including chairs, benches, a table, a desk, a stool, and a mirror with a gilded frame— display Gaudí's move towards fluid, organic designs while still retaining somewhat traditional elements. However, the armchair he designed for the office, though containing ornamental flourishes and featuring a distinctive heart-shaped seat back and a round seat, breaks away from tradition, lacking a single straight line. An example of "free-form" furniture, the chair was designed to "cradle the human body," and its lines are reminiscent of Art Nouveau furniture without being strictly classified as Art Nouveau. Soon, Gaudí would strip away remaining elements of "superfluous ornamentation" in favor of simple "comfort and utility." From this point on, his furniture designs feature "solid forms and simple profiles," sometimes suggesting the simple lines of medieval furniture design while still containing his trademark "sinuous and zigzagging lines."

== Casa Batlló and the confidant ==
The furniture that Gaudí designed for his renovation of Casa Batlló (1904-1906) is much more simplified than any of his designs for previous projects, eliminating all ornamentation and upholstery while emphasizing practicality and functionality. Whereas his furniture for Casa Calvet still retained recognizable callbacks to traditional design, the Casa Batlló furniture broke away entirely from tradition, with shapes that gave the appearance of being molded with soft material and tables and benches that were broken up into multiple sections instead of having solid surfaces. Benches and chairs such as the confidant not only had seats that were rounded to fit the human form, but also had sizes and shapes that allowed them to fit perfectly against the wall where they were meant to be placed. Even though Mrs. Batlló begged Gaudí to add traditional upholstery and other textile elements to the furniture for her house, he refused and even went further, eliminating marquetery and carved elements as well, techniques that were in vogue with other designers of the time. Gaudí's radical furniture designs for the Casa Batlló received acclaim from surrealist artists and especially from Salvador Dalí.

== After Casa Batlló ==
Gaudí's furniture design continued to evolve after Casa Batlló as he designed buildings and spaces that presented new challenges in integrating furnishings with their surroundings. For Casa Milá (1906-1912), he wanted the walls, ceilings, balconies, door handles, and furniture not only to share the same curved forms but also to reflect and complement the "sandstone and cement" colors of the building's tiles and exterior.

One of the last furniture pieces that Gaudí designed before devoting the remainder of his life to the design and construction of Sagrada Família, the bench for the unfinished Colònia Güell, demonstrated that he was still unafraid to add new elements to his design to adapt to the space, in this case the crypt in the church. Needing to add "solidity and stability" that wood alone could not provide, Gaudí used iron elements to support the structure of the bench.

== Art Nouveau ==
Art Nouveau is an international philosophy and style of art, architecture and applied art—especially the decorative arts—that were most popular during 1890–1910. The name "Art Nouveau" is French for "new art". A reaction to academic art of the 19th century, it was inspired by natural forms and structures, not only in flowers and plants but also in curved lines. Architects tried to harmonize with the natural environment. It is also considered a philosophy of design of furniture, which was designed according to the whole building and made part of ordinary life.

In Spain, the style was based mainly in Barcelona and was an essential element of the Catalan Modernisme, often understood as an equivalent to a number of fin-de-siècle art movements, such as Art Nouveau, Jugendstil, Secessionism, and Liberty style. Architect Antoni Gaudí, whose decorative architectural style is so personal that he is sometimes considered as practising an artistic style different from Art Nouveau, nonetheless uses Art Nouveau's floral and organic forms. His designs from about 1903, the Casa Batlló (1904–1906) and Casa Milà (1906–1908), are most closely related to the stylistic elements of Art Nouveau. However, famous structures such as the Sagrada Familia characteristically contrast the modernising Art Nouveau tendencies with revivalist Neo-Gothic.

== Further examples of Gaudi's work ==
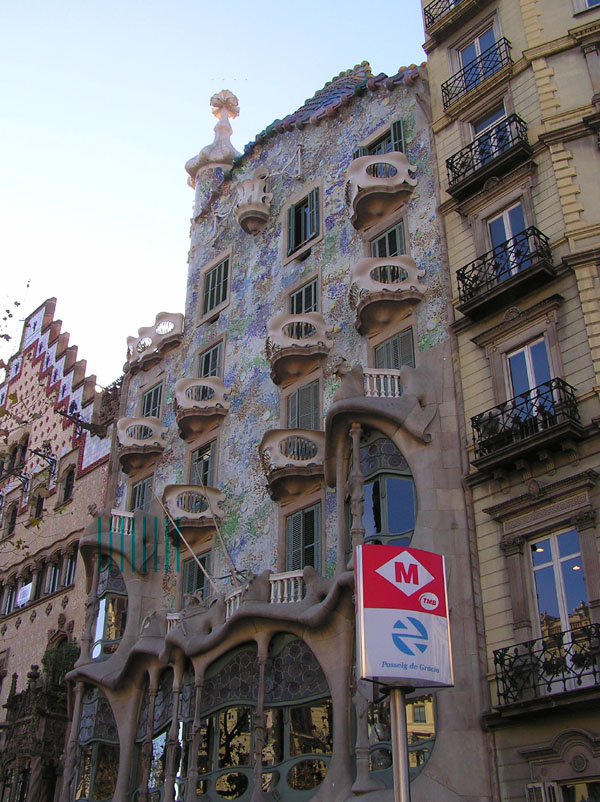
Casa Batlló

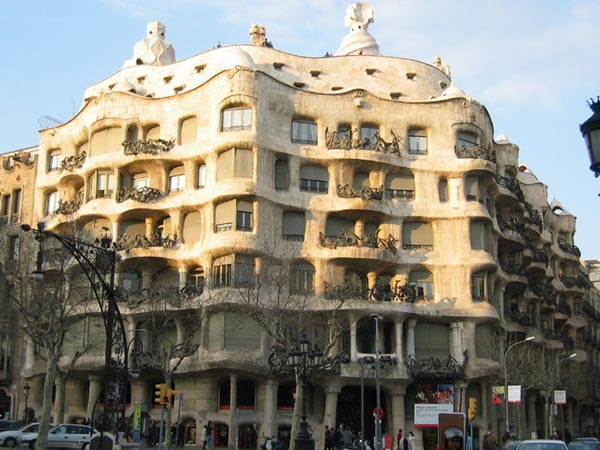
Casa Milà

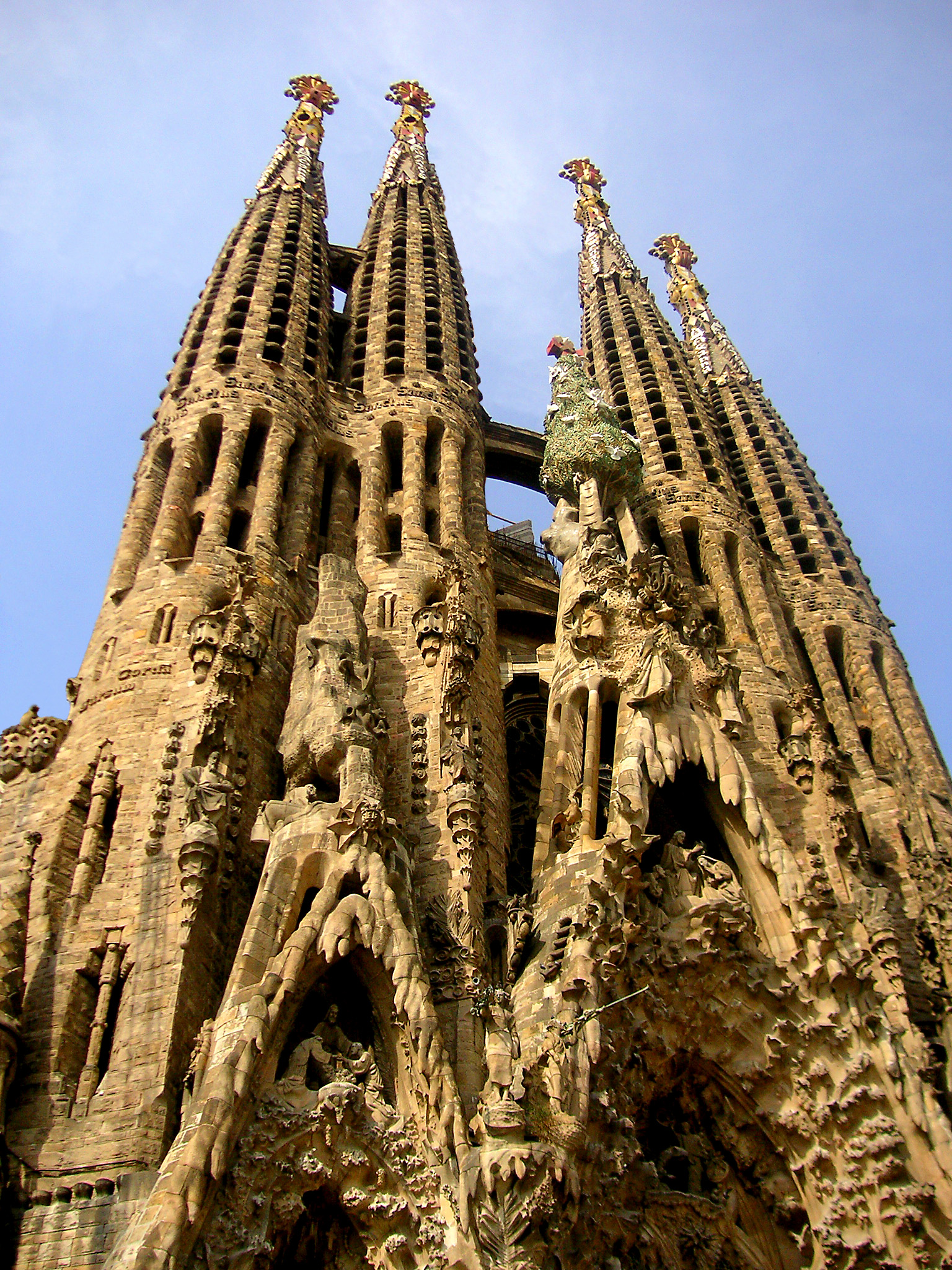
Sagrada Familia

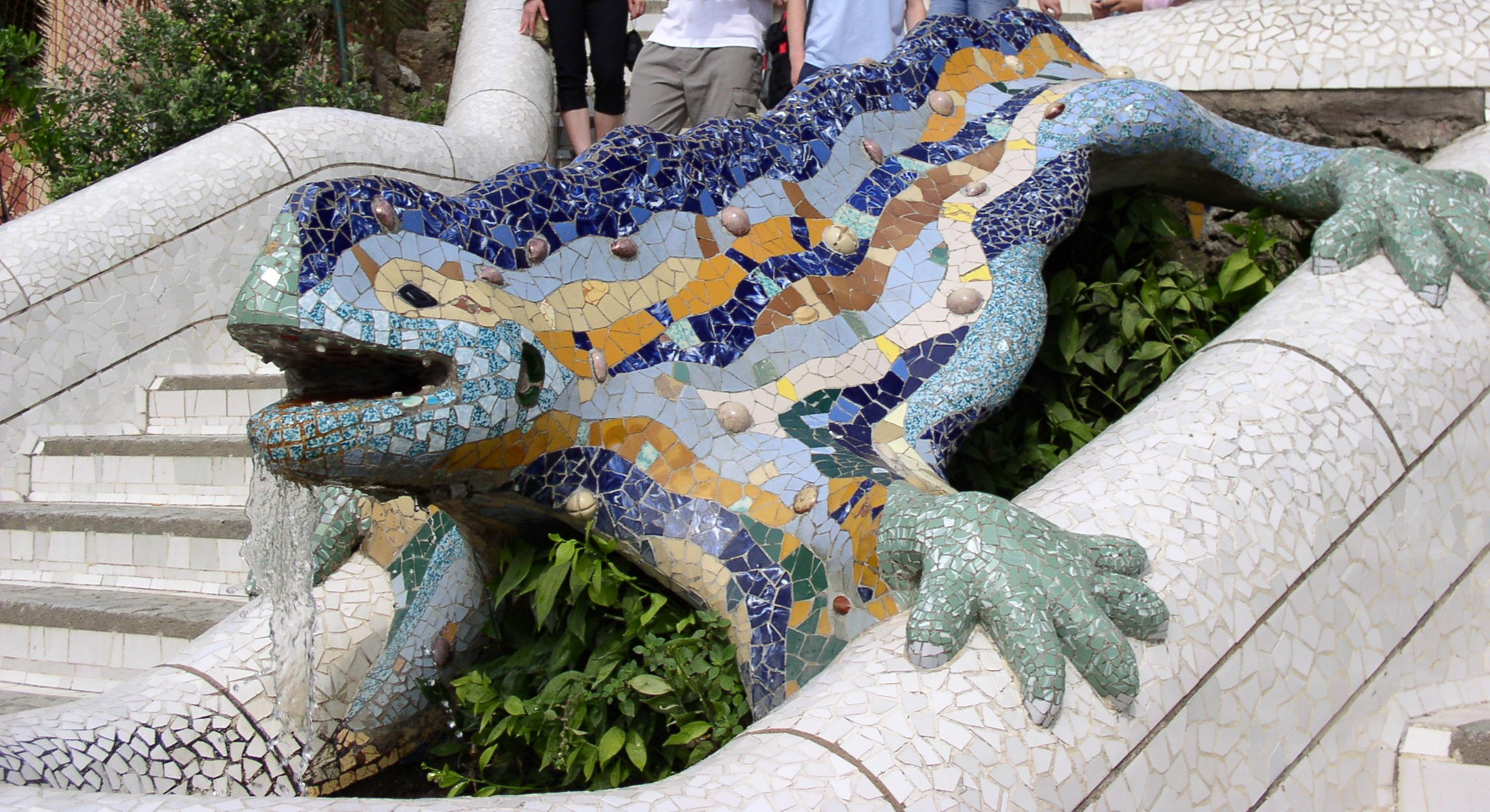
Trencadís in Parc Güell

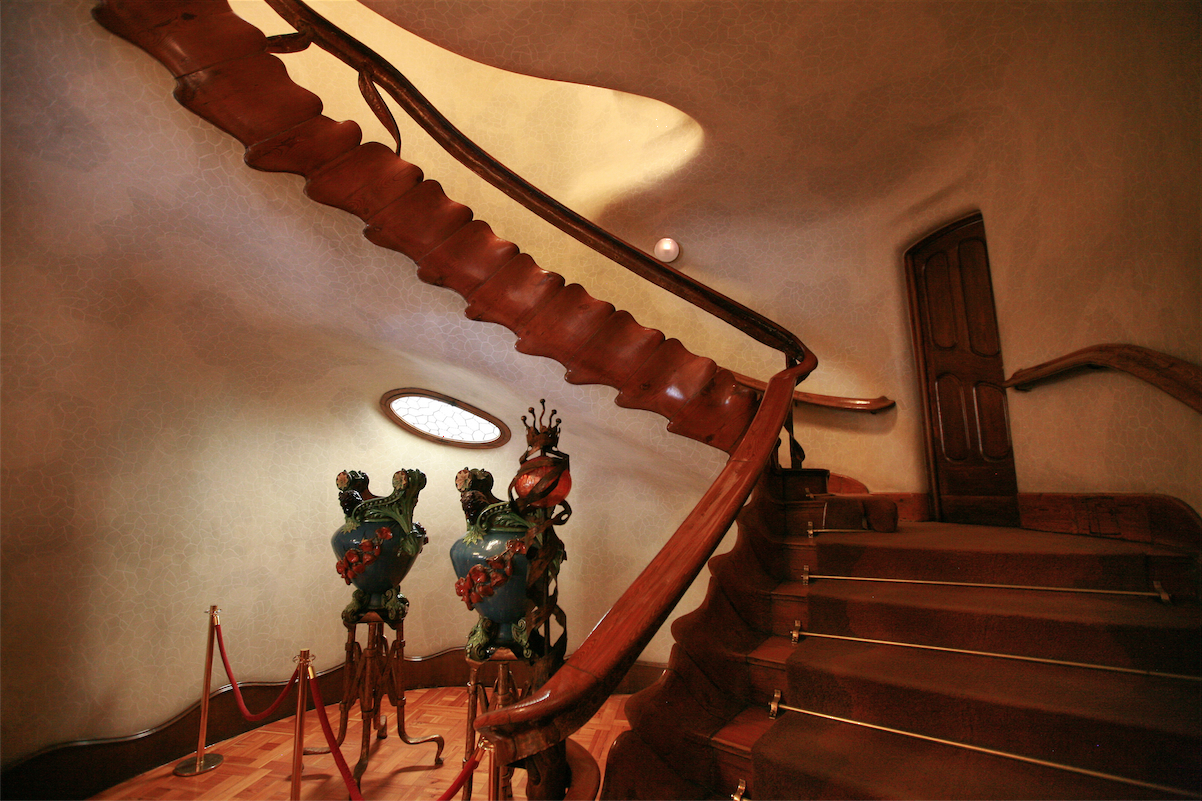
Organic Forms in Casa Batlló

== See also ==
- List of Gaudí buildings
