= Alan Loy McGinnis =

American author and psychotherapist (1933–2005)

Alan Loy McGinnis (10 November 1933 in Friendswood, Texas – 9 January 2005 in Glendale, California) was an author, Christian psychotherapist, and the founder and director of the Valley Counseling Center in Glendale, California, United States. He was also the minister of Grandview Presbyterian Church around 1970.

== Early life and education ==
McGinnis was born into a family of Quakers and became a devout Christian at the age of 11; he attended Bob Jones University, Pacific Bible College (now Azusa Pacific University) and Wheaton College (Illinois) for his undergraduate studies. He later pursued postgraduate studies in theology and psychology at Princeton University, Fuller Theological Seminary and Columbia University.

He was ordained as a United Presbyterian pastor and also worked as a family therapist, corporate consultant, and speaker for television, radio, and corporate audiences.

Today, there are over 3 million copies of his books in print. His 1979 book The Friendship Factor has sold over 1,000,000 copies, and his 1985 book Bringing Out the Best in People has sold over 600,000 copies. His works have been translated into over 14 languages.

McGinnis's books are known for their clear writing style, characterized by simple, short sentences.

His books include:

- The Friendship Factor (1979)
- The Romance Factor (1982)
- Bringing Out the Best in People (1985)
- Confidence (self-help-book) (1987)
- The Power of Optimism (1993)
- The Balanced Life (1997)
