= One Love (Marianas Trench song) =

Single by Marianas Trench

from the album Astoria
- Released: September 14, 2015
- Genre: Pop
- Length: 4:01
- Label: 604; Cherrytree; Interscope
- Songwriter(s): Josh Ramsay
- Producer(s): Josh Ramsay

Marianas Trench singles chronology
"Here's to the Zeros" (2015)	"One Love" (2015)	"This Means War" (2016)

Music video
- "One Love" on YouTube

"One Love" is a song by Canadian pop rock group Marianas Trench. It was released to digital retailers through 604 Records, Cherrytree Records, and Interscope Records on September 14, 2015, as the album's lead single for their fourth studio album, Astoria (2015). The song was later serviced to American hot adult contemporary radio on November 9, 2015, through 604 Records. The song was written, composed, and produced by the band's lead singer, Josh Ramsay.

== Background ==
Speaking about "One Love", lead singer Josh Ramsay stated,

"I think most people like to think that there's one person out there for everyone. No one ever talks about what you do if you're lucky enough to find that person, and you screw it up. What do you do after that? I certainly don't know, but I'm trying to figure it out."

== Composition ==
"One Love" is a midtempo ballad written by Josh Ramsay with a duration of four minutes and one second (4:01). It has been described primarily as pop, in a departure from the rock and pop punk influences of the band's earlier work. Lyrically, the song discusses the concept of soulmates and addresses a situation in which one meets their supposed "true love" but the relationship does not last, with an overarching theme of love gone wrong.

== Chart performance ==
"One Love" entered the Billboard Canadian Hot 100 at number 60 on the chart dated October 3, 2015. The same week, the song debuted at number 19 on the Hot Canadian Digital Songs component chart. The song reached its peak position of 50 on the former four weeks later, on the chart dated November 28, 2015. In addition, the song has charted within the top 20 on the nation's adult contemporary, mainstream top 40, and hot adult contemporary airplay charts, with a peak position of 14 on the former giving the band their most successful AC single since Billboard began publishing the chart in 2012.

On the chart dated December 12, 2015, "One Love" debuted at number 40 on the Billboard Adult Pop Songs chart, becoming the group's first charting single in the US. It reached a peak position of 35.

== Music video ==
A lyric video for the song was uploaded to the band's Vevo channel on October 14, 2015 wherein the lyrics are depicted on the window of a moving train. The official music video was directed by Kyle Davison – who has directed all of their videos since "Haven't Had Enough" in 2011 – and premiered November 5, 2015. In the video, the band is trapped in a house rapidly filling with water, and the viewer is left with an ambiguous ending. The video was sponsored by MuchFACT.

== Charts ==
Chart performance for "One Love"
Chart (2015–16)	Peak position
Canada (Canadian Hot 100)	50
Canada AC (Billboard)	14
Canada CHR/Top 40 (Billboard)	20
Canada Hot AC (Billboard)	16
US Adult Pop Airplay (Billboard)	35

== Certifications ==
Certifications and sales for "One Love"
Region	Certification	Certified units/sales
Canada (Music Canada)	Platinum	80,000^{‡}
^{‡} Sales+streaming figures based on certification alone.

== Release history ==
Release dates and formats for "One Love"
Region	Date	Format	Label	Ref.
Canada	September 14, 2015	Digital download	604 Records	
United States	September 14, 2015	Digital download	Cherrytree Records; Interscope Records	
United States	November 9, 2015	Hot adult contemporary	604 Records; Cherrytree Records	
