= Tyler Shaw =

Canadian singer & actor

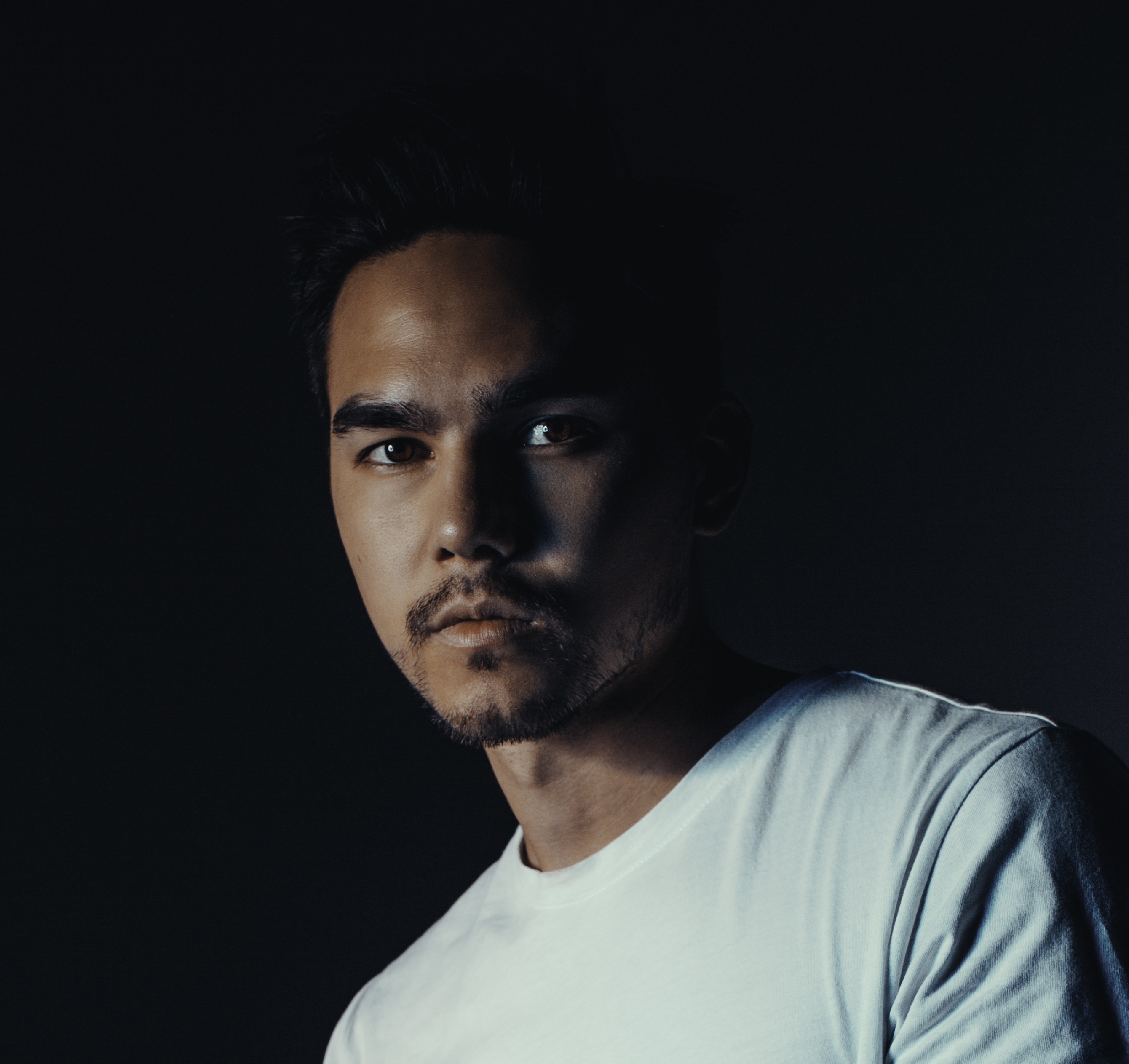

Background information
- Origin: Coquitlam, British Columbia, Canada
- Genre: Pop
- Occupations: Musician; singer; songwriter; actor
- Instruments: Guitar, piano
- Years active: 2012–present
- Labels: Tyler Ip; Sony
- Website: tylershawmusic.com

Chinese name
- Traditional Chinese: 葉銘恆
- Simplified Chinese: 叶铭恒
Transcriptions
Standard Mandarin
- Hanyu Pinyin: Yè Mínghéng
Yue: Cantonese
- Jyutping: Jip^{6} Ming^{4}hang^{4}

Tyler Shaw is a Canadian singer, songwriter and actor. After winning the MuchMusic Coca-Cola Covers Contest 2012 organized by the Canadian music cable channel MuchMusic, he released his debut single, "Kiss Goodnight", via Sony Music Canada in December 2012. The song was quickly certified Gold by Music Canada in April 2013. His debut studio album, Yesterday, was released on September 4, 2015, by Sony Music. It spawned over 6 singles and is a certified gold album. His sophomore album Intuition was released on September 28, 2018, also via Sony Music Canada, followed up by the self-titled third studio album Tyler Shaw on August 20, 2021.

== Early life ==
Tyler Shaw was raised in Coquitlam, British Columbia. He attended Riverside Secondary School in Port Coquitlam. He is of Chinese and Polish descent. He played for the university soccer team while a student at the University of Prince Edward Island.

== Musical career ==
=== 2012–2017: Career beginnings and Yesterday ===
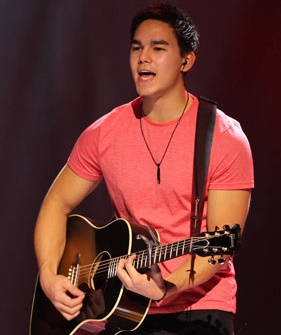
Tyler Shaw performing in 2012

Shaw's debut single, "Kiss Goodnight", was co-written by Shaw with Stephen Kozmeniuk and Todd Clark, and was produced by Koz and Zubin Thakkar. The follow-up single "By My Side" was released as Shaw's second official single in June 2013. He released "It Happens All the Time" in 2014 and the single "House of Cards" in 2015. Shaw released his debut studio album Yesterday on September 4, 2015. In January 2016, Shaw released "Wicked"; the song was later certified gold.

Shaw performed as a supporting act for Canadian artist Alessia Cara.

=== 2018–present: Intuition and Tyler Shaw ===
In December 2017, Shaw released the Christmas single "Silent Night", which was serviced to Canadian radio. The lead single from Shaw's second album was "Cautious", which was released in January 2018. The single was certified gold.

His second studio album, Intuition (stylized in all caps) was released on September 28, 2018, by Sony Music Canada.

Shaw's album Intuition received a Juno Awards nomination for Pop Album of the Year in January 2019.

In addition to writing, performing and producing music for his own project, Shaw has also co-wrote a song with Olivia Lunny. Tyler's self-titled third studio album was released on August 20, 2021.

In 2023, he participated in an all-star recording of Serena Ryder's single "What I Wouldn't Do", which was released as a charity single to benefit Kids Help Phone's Feel Out Loud campaign for youth mental health.

On October 27, 2026, he was announced among the participants of Canada's Choice, the Canadian national final for the Eurovision Song Contest 2027.

== Other activities ==
Shaw made his acting debut in the 2017 Canadian independent film The Meaning of Life, directed by Cat Hostick. He also appeared as himself in the episode "Dancing in the Rain" on the Canadian drama series Lost & Found Music Studios.

In February 2020, Tyler announced via his social media that he had officially signed with Sutherland Models, one of Canada's premier modelling agencies. In March 2020, the single "With You" was featured in a national commercial for Rogers 5G network. The commercial featured Tyler as a live performer. In a partnership with Rogers. Tyler also had an interactive live hologram activation at the Rogers 302 flagship store in downtown Toronto, which performed some of his biggest hits.

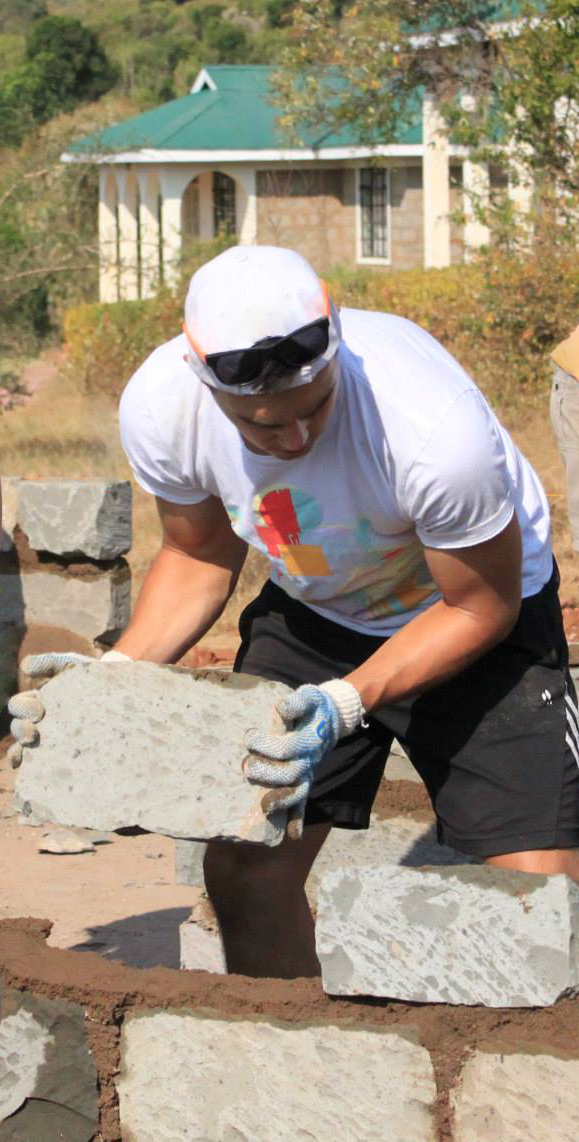
Shaw working with We Charity in Kenya in 2014

Tyler performed at the WE Organization's WE DAY events and helped build a school in Kenya. Tyler has also participated in initiatives like Bell Let’s Talk and smaller community events that focus on raising awareness and eliminating stigmas associated with mental illness.

In April 2020, Shaw co-created the artists initiative ArtistsCAN to help raise funds for the Canadian Red Cross for COVID-19 relief.

== Personal life ==
Shaw married longtime girlfriend Alex Karolczyk on August 18, 2018, after six years of dating. Shaw lives in Canada's capital, Ottawa, with his wife and three daughters.

== Discography ==
=== Studio albums ===
Title	Details
Yesterday	Release date: September 4, 2015; Label: Tyler Ip / Sony Music Canada; Format: CD, digital download
Intuition	Release date: September 28, 2018; Label: Aisle 13 / Sony Music Canada; Format: CD, digital download
Tyler Shaw	Release date: August 20, 2021; Label: Aisle 13 / Sony Music Canada; Format: CD, digital download
A Tyler Shaw Christmas	Release date: November 5, 2021; Label: Aisle 13 / Sony Music Canada; Format: CD, digital download
There's No Easy Way to Put This...	Release date: February 19, 2027; Label: Aisle 13 / Sony Music Canada; Format: CD, digital download

=== Singles ===
==== As lead artist ====
Year	Title	Peak positions					Certifications	Album
Year	Title	CAN	CAN AC	CAN CHR	CAN Hot AC	POL Air.	Certifications	Album
2012	"Kiss Goodnight"	24	5	18	7	—	MC: Platinum	Yesterday
2013	"By My Side"	34	9	28	12	—		Yesterday
2014	"It Happens All the Time"	94	21	48	31	—		Yesterday
2015	"House of Cards"	37	11	12	10	—	MC: Gold	Yesterday
2015	"Dizzy"	—	—	33	41	—		Yesterday
2016	"Wicked"	51	13	13	6	—	MC: Gold	Yesterday
2018	"Cautious"	87	8	16	10	—	MC: Gold	Intuition
2018	"With You"	34	7	8	7	—	MC: 2× Platinum	Intuition
2019	"To the Man Who Let Her Go"	53	4	11	7	—	MC: Platinum	Intuition
2020	"Remember"	48	47	16	29	—	MC: Gold	Tyler Shaw
2021	"When You're Home"	—	—	—	—	—		Tyler Shaw
2021	"I See You"	81	—	—	—	—		Tyler Shaw
2022	"Love You Still (abcdefu romantic version)"	—	—	—	—	—	MC: Platinum	Non-album singles
2023	"Out of Sight"	—	—	—	—	—		Non-album singles
2024	"Back to Me"	—	—	—	—	—		Non-album singles
2025	"Woman on the Moon"	—	—	—	—	—		Non-album singles
2025	"Fire" (with Gromee)	—	—	—	—	46		Non-album singles
2026	"Run to You"	91	11	—	7	—		There's No Easy Way to Put This...
2026	"The Otherside"	—	—	—	—	—		There's No Easy Way to Put This...
"—" denotes releases that did not chart

==== As featured artist ====
Year	Title	Peak positions	Album
Year	Title	CAN CHR	Album
2016	"Runaway" (ODC featuring Tyler Shaw)	—	Non-album singles
2020	"Lean on Me" (with ArtistsCAN)	—	Non-album singles
2022	"Can't Give It Up" (Josh Ramsay featuring Tyler Shaw)	—	The Josh Ramsay Show
2023	"Confident" (Sacha featuring Tyler Shaw)	—	Confident
2024	"Gravity" (Frank Walker featuring Tyler Shaw)	22	Origin
"—" denotes releases that did not chart

==== Promotional singles ====
Year	Title	Album
2014	"Showtime"	Yesterday
2018	"Anybody Out There" (featuring Amaal Nuux)	Intuition
2018	"Wanted"	Intuition
2018	"If I Ever Lost You"	Intuition
2021	"North Star"	Tyler Shaw
2021	"Be Like You"	Tyler Shaw
2021	"Sex on the Beach"	Tyler Shaw
2023	"Driving"	Non-album singles
2024	"Clairvoyant"	Non-album singles
2024	"Past Life"	Non-album singles
2024	"Faded Splendor" (featuring Donovan Woods)	Non-album singles
2026	"There's No Easy Way to Put This..."	There's No Easy Way to Put This...

==== Christmas singles ====
Year	Title	Peak positions			Album
Year	Title	CAN	CAN AC	CAN Hot AC	Album
2014	"Baby, It's Cold Outside" (featuring Kira Isabella)	—	31	—	Non-album single
2014	"It's Christmas"	—	43	—	A Tyler Shaw Christmas
2018	"Silent Night"	—	11	—	A Tyler Shaw Christmas
2019	"Christmas Time"	—	3	48	A Tyler Shaw Christmas
2020	"Maybe This Christmas"	—	—	—	A Tyler Shaw Christmas
2021	"O Holy Night" (featuring the Tenors)	—	—	—	A Tyler Shaw Christmas
2022	"This Christmas"	86	1	—	A Tyler Shaw Christmas
2023	"Last Christmas" (Virginia to Vegas featuring Tyler Shaw, Lolo, New Friends, Noelle, Shawn Hook)	—	—	—	Non-album single
2023	"Christmas All Over Again"	—	1	—	A Tyler Shaw Christmas
2024	"What Christmas Means to Me"	99	1	—	A Tyler Shaw Christmas
2025	"Christmas (Baby Please Come Home)"	—	—	—	A Tyler Shaw Christmas
"—" denotes releases that did not chart

== Nominations ==
Award	Year (Note: Indicates the year of ceremony.)	Category	Nominee(s)	Result	Ref.
Indies	2016	Pop Artist/Group of the Year	Himself	Nominated	
Juno Awards	2014	Breakthrough Artist of the Year	Himself	Nominated	
Juno Awards	2019	Pop Album of the Year	Intuition	Nominated	
Juno Awards	2023	Adult Contemporary Album of the Year	A Tyler Shaw Christmas	Nominated	
Juno Awards	2023	Fan Choice	Himself	Nominated	
MuchMusic Awards	2013	MuchFact Video of the Year	"Kiss Goodnight"	Nominated	
