= This Means War (Marianas Trench song) =

Single by Marianas Trench

from the album Astoria
- Released: February 16, 2016
- Genre: Pop rock; new wave
- Length: 3:24
- Label: 604
- Songwriter(s): Josh Ramsay
- Producer(s): Josh Ramsay

Marianas Trench singles chronology
"One Love" (2015)	"This Means War" (2016)	"Who Do You Love" (2016)

Music video
- "This Means War" on YouTube

"This Means War" is a song by Canadian pop rock group Marianas Trench. It was serviced to Canadian radio on February 16, 2016, as the second official single from their fourth studio album, Astoria (2015). The song was written and produced by the band's lead singer, Josh Ramsay.

"This Means War" was the first single of the group's career to not enter the Billboard Canadian Hot 100.

== Composition and lyrics ==
"This Means War" is about the absence of emotion that follows a break up, and how sometimes people would rather fight than feeling nothing; as Ramsay sings in the opening verse, "So nice to see you here, impolite would almost be beneath us." The song explores the thin line between love and hate with respect to passion. Musically, the song has been compared to Bananarama's "Cruel Summer", particularly in its use of the xylophone. The song's melody also shares similarities with Tom Cochrane's 1991 hit, "Life is a Highway".

== Promotion ==
The band released a lyric video for the song through their Vevo account on March 10, 2016. "This Means War" was included in the setlist for their Hey! You Guys and Never Say Die tours in support of Astoria.

== Music video ==
An accompanying music video was filmed in Los Angeles, California in the spring of 2016 and was directed by Anthony Chirco. It premiered May 20, 2016. Inspired by the musical West Side Story, the video depicts the band competing in a territorial "dance battle" with a rival gang. Ramsay explained the video's premise in the following statement: "Put on your leather, stretch your hamstrings and grab your can of paint! We're invading each other's turf but there can be only one. This means war!"

== Charts ==
Chart performance for "This Means War"
Chart (2016)	Peak position
Canada AC (Billboard)	38
Canada CHR/Top 40 (Billboard)	37
Canada Hot AC (Billboard)	38
