= 2013 MuchMusic Video Awards =

Annual edition of the awards show

- Date: June 16, 2013
- Location: 299 Queen Street West, Toronto
- Hosted by: Psy

Highlights
- Most awards: Classified; Drake; Marianas Trench (2)
- Most nominations: Marianas Trench (6)

Television/radio coverage
- Network: MuchMusic; Fuse (US)

The 2013 MuchMusic Video Awards were held on Sunday June 16, 2013 at the MuchMusic headquarters in Toronto, Canada. Demi Lovato was the first performer announced. Psy served as co-host and a performer.

== Nominations ==
Winners are shown in bold type.

=== Video of the Year ===
- **Classified ft. David Myles – "Inner Ninja"**
- Drake – "Started from the Bottom"
- Marianas Trench – "Desperate Measures"
- Serena Ryder – "Stompa"
- The Weeknd – "Wicked Games"

=== Post-Production of the Year ===
- **Billy Talent – "Surprise Surprise"**
- Colin Munroe ft. Pusha T – "The Fight of My Life"
- deadmau5 ft. Chris James – "The Veldt"
- The Sheepdogs – "Feeling Good"
- Young Empires – "White Doves"

=== Dance Video of the Year ===
- Anjulie – "You and I"
- **deadmau5 ft. Chris James – "The Veldt"**
- Dragonette – "Live In This City"
- Grimes – "Genesis"
- Mia Martina – "Heartbreaker"

=== Director of the Year ===
- **Drake – "Started From the Bottom"** Director: Director X
- Marianas Trench – "Stutter" Director: Kyle Davison
- Rich Aucoin – "Brian Wilson Is Alive" Director: Noah Pink
- Serena Ryder – "Stompa" Director: Natalie Rae Robinson
- Victoria Duffield and Cody Simpson – "They Don't Know About Us" Director: RT!

=== Pop Video of the Year ===
- Down With Webster – "One In A Million"
- Hedley – "Kiss You Inside Out"
- Kardinal Offishal ft. Karl Wolf – "Turn It Up"
- **Marianas Trench – "Desperate Measures"**
- Shawn Desman – "Too Young To Care"

=== Rock/Alternative Video of the Year ===
- Billy Talent – "Surprise Surprise"
- Matt Mays – "Take It On Faith"
- Metric – "Youth Without Youth"
- **Serena Ryder – "Stompa"**
- The Sheepdogs – "Feeling Good"

=== Hip Hop Video of the Year ===
- Classified ft. David Myles – "Inner Ninja"
- **Drake – "Started From the Bottom"**
- k–os – "Nyce 2 Know Ya"
- Madchild ft. Matt Brevner and Dutch Robinson – "Jitters"
- SonReal & Rich Kidd – "Hometown"

=== MuchFact Video of the Year ===
- **Classified ft. David Myles – "Inner Ninja"**
- Marianas Trench – "Stutter"
- Metric – "Youth Without Youth"
- Tyler Shaw – "Kiss Goodnight"
- Young Empires – "White Doves"

=== International Video of the Year – Artist ===
- **Demi Lovato – "Heart Attack"**
- Ed Sheeran – "Give Me Love"
- Justin Timberlake – "Mirrors"
- Nicki Minaj – "Va Va Voom"
- Phillip Phillips – "Home"
- P!nk – "Try"
- PSY – "Gangnam Style"
- Rihanna – "Diamonds"
- Taylor Swift – "We Are Never Ever Getting Back Together"
- will.i.am ft. Britney Spears – "Scream and Shout"

=== International Video of the Year – Group ===
- fun. – "Some Nights"
- Jay-Z and Kanye West ft. Frank Ocean and The Dream – "No Church in the Wild"
- Imagine Dragons – "Radioactive"
- Jonas Brothers – "Pom Poms"
- **Macklemore and Ryan Lewis ft. Wanz – "Thrift Shop"**
- Maroon 5 ft. Wiz Khalifa – "Payphone"
- Mumford & Sons – "I Will Wait"
- One Direction – "Kiss You"
- Swedish House Mafia – "Don't You Worry Child"
- The Lumineers – "Stubborn Love"

=== International Video of the Year by a Canadian ===
- **Avril Lavigne – "Here's to Never Growing Up"**
- Carly Rae Jepsen – "This Kiss"
- Justin Bieber ft. Big Sean – "As Long As You Love Me"
- Tegan and Sara – "Closer"
- Walk off the Earth – "Red Hands"

=== Viral Video of the Year ===
- Macklemore and Ryan Lewis ft. Wanz – "Thrift Shop"
- **PSY – "Gangnam Style"**
- PSY – "Gentleman"
- Walk off the Earth – "Somebody That I Used to Know"

=== Your Fave Video of the Year ===
- Billy Talent – "Surprise Surprise"
- Classified ft. David Myles – "Inner Ninja"
- Drake – "Started from the Bottom"
- Hedley – "Kiss You Inside Out"
- **Marianas Trench – "Stutter"**

=== Your Fave Artist/Group ===
- Carly Rae Jepsen
- deadmau5
- Drake
- **Justin Bieber**
- Marianas Trench

=== Your Fave International Artist/Group ===
- Demi Lovato
- One Direction
- P!nk
- PSY
- **Taylor Swift**

== Performers ==
- PSY – "Gangnam Style"
- Down with Webster – "One In a Million"
- Classified ft. David Myles – "Inner Ninja"
- Ed Sheeran – "Lego House"
- Armin Van Buuren ft. Trevor Guthrie – "This Is What It Feels Like"
- Serena Ryder – "What I Wouldn't Do"/Stompa"
- Avril Lavigne – "Here's to Never Growing Up"
- Marianas Trench – "Desperate Measures"
- Phillip Phillips – "Home"
- Demi Lovato – "Give Your Heart a Break"/"Heart Attack"
- PSY – "Gentleman"

== Presenters ==
- Lucy Hale
- Shay Mitchell
- Stephen Amell
- Brittany Snow
- Naya Rivera
- Kunal Nayyar
- Shawn Desman
- Patrick J. Adams
- Taylor Swift
- Austin Mahone
- Cody Simpson
- Tyler Hoechlin
- Luke Bilyk
- Billy Talent
- Danny Fernandes
- The Janoskians
- Josh Bowman
- Mia Martina
- Anjulie
