= Josh Ramsay =

Canadian singer-songwriter

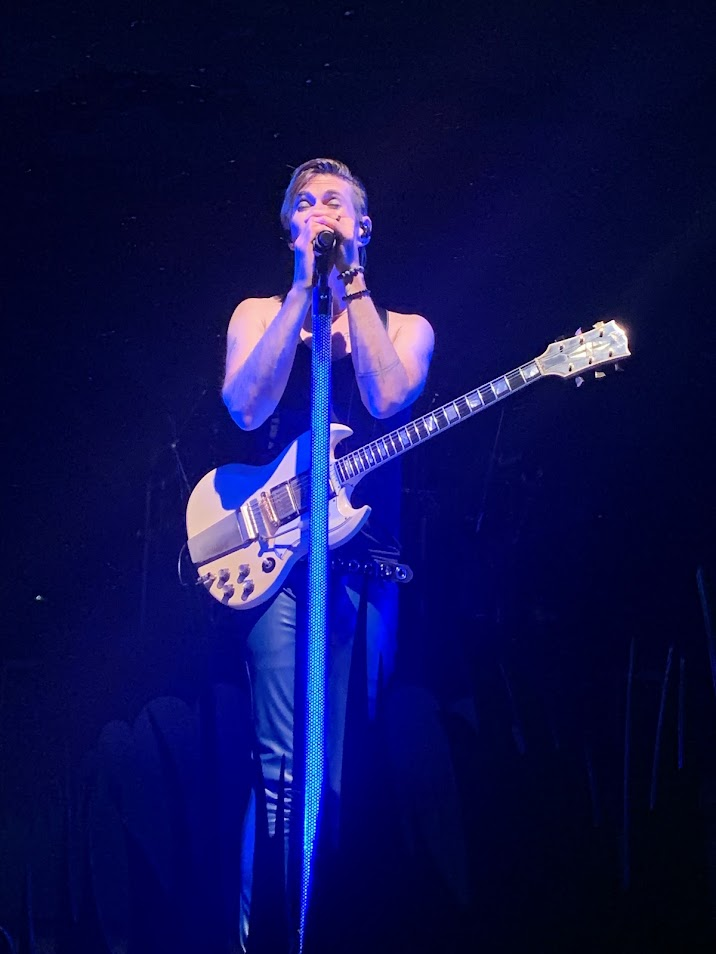
- Ramsay in 2024

Background information
- Born: Joshua Keeler Ramsay; 11 June 1985 (age 41); Vancouver, British Columbia, Canada
- Genres: Pop-punk; pop rock; emo; alternative rock; progressive rock; symphonic rock; pop
- Occupations: Musician; singer-songwriter; producer; vocal coach
- Instruments: Vocals; guitar; piano; keyboards; bass; drums; harmonica; violin; flugelhorn
- Years active: 1999–present
- Labels: 604; Cherrytree
- Member of: Marianas Trench

Joshua Keeler Ramsay (born 11 June 1985) is a Canadian singer, songwriter, producer, recording engineer, and multi-instrumentalist. He is best known for being the lead vocalist of the pop rock band Marianas Trench and co-creating "Call Me Maybe". He has produced and has written songs for a wide array of artists including Carly Rae Jepsen, Nickelback, Jessica Lee, Faber Drive, and Suzie McNeil. He also released his debut studio album, The Josh Ramsay Show in 2022.

== Early life ==
Josh Keeler Ramsay was born in Vancouver, British Columbia to musicians Miles Ramsay and Corlynn Haney. Haney worked as a vocal teacher, and his father helped to found Little Mountain Sound Studios. Having been heavily influenced by his musical upbringing, Ramsay began a solo career at the age of 14. He later formed a band with his sister, Sara Ramsay called Ramsay Fiction.

Ramsay attended high school at Magee Secondary School, where he was later expelled due to his heroin addiction at the time. He sought treatment for his addiction at the age of 18. Ramsay also struggled with depression, bulimia and anorexia while in high school.

While still attending Magee Secondary School, Ramsay and classmate Matt Webb began forming what would become Marianas Trench. The pair found Ian Casselman in an ad in the newspaper, who introduced them to Mike Ayley, Ian's roommate at the time. The four members went through many names before finally settling on Marianas Trench.

Ramsay is a dual citizen of Canada and the United States.

== Career ==
=== Marianas Trench ===
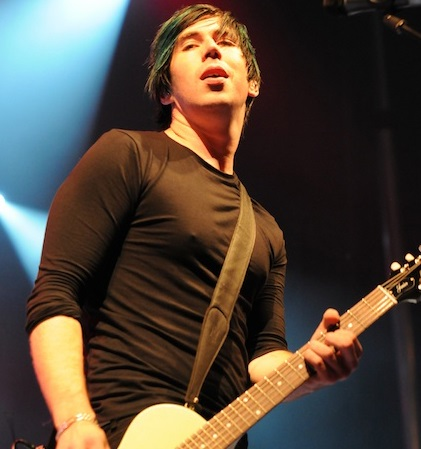
Ramsay in 2010

Ramsay formed the band Marianas Trench in 2001 and released their first self-titled EP the following year. The band later signed with 604 Records, through the assistance of owner Chad Kroeger and co-owner Jonathan Simkin. Their debut studio album Fix Me was released on 3 October 2006.

Their second studio album Masterpiece Theatre was released on 24 February 2009, and debuted at No. 4 on the Canadian Albums Chart, selling 5,000 copies in its first week.

Ever After, the third studio album from Marianas Trench, was released on 21 November 2011. It was certified triple-platinum by Music Canada in January 2025. The first single from the album, entitled "Haven't Had Enough" was released in July 2011, and reached the No. 1 spot on iTunes Canada Top of the Charts and Pop Downloads. On April 22, 2013, at the annual Juno Awards, Marianas Trench won the 2013 Juno Award for Group of the Year.

On 23 October 2015, their fourth studio album, Astoria, was released. This album includes the singles "One Love", "This Means War" and "Who Do You Love". The story-theme album was recorded in Josh's home. In 2017, they released "Rhythm of Your Heart".

On 1 March 2019, their fifth studio album, Phantoms, was released, including singles such as "I Knew You When", "Only the Lonely Survive", and "Echoes of You". The band uses the idea of closely linked emotions attached to love and death throughout the album.

The group released their sixth studio album, Haven on 30 August 2024.

=== Songwriting and solo music ===
Ramsay plays 13 instruments, and often plays all of the instruments on the songs he produces for other artists. He also owns the studio, The Umbrella Factory. Ramsay was featured on the Carly Rae Jepsen song "Sour Candy" in 2008. He was recruited to co-write and produce her hit single "Call Me Maybe" with Tavish Crowe, which was nominated for Song of the Year at the 2013 Grammy Awards. He was also featured on the song "Hit Me Up" by Danny Fernandes.

In 2010, Ramsay partook in Young Artists for Haiti performing a rendition of K'naan's "Wavin' Flag". He also recorded the song "Baby Please Come Home" for the 604 Records Christmas album. He released a non-album single with Emily Osment titled, "Hush" on 10 May 2011, and the song peaked at number 90 on the Canadian Hot 100. He also provided vocals for the opening theme song for The Hub's Transformers: Rescue Bots.

In 2014, he co-wrote two songs for Nickelback, "Satellite" and "She Keeps Me Up". He also co-wrote the song "Story of Another Us" in 2015, by 5 Seconds of Summer. In 2018, he released the single, "We Should Be Friends", which he wrote for the 2017 film Adventures in Public School. The song peaked at number 8 on the Canada Top Downloads chart.

On 3 December 2021, he released "Lady Mine", featuring Chad Kroeger, as the lead single from his debut studio album. Entitled, The Josh Ramsay Show, it was released on 8 April 2022. It included features from other Canadian artists such as his sister Sara Ramsay, Ria Mae, Serena Ryder, Tyler Shaw and Fefe Dobson. The album's second single "Best of Me" was released on 15 February 2022, featuring Dallas Smith.

== Personal life ==
On 20 March 2020, Ramsay posted a photo of himself and the Canadian actress-writer Amanda McEwan to his Instagram feed announcing their marriage. They have one child together.

== Discography ==
The discography of Marianas Trench, a Canadian pop rock band, consists of four studio albums, two extended plays, 18 singles and 18 music videos. The band have been certified multi-platinum by Music Canada for their CD and digital download sales.

=== Albums ===
List of albums with selected details
Title	Details
The Josh Ramsay Show	Released: 8 April 2022; Label: 604; Format: CD, Digital download, LP

=== Singles ===
==== As lead artist ====
List of singles, with selected chart positions and certifications
Title	Year	Peak chart positions				Album
Title	Year	CAN	CAN AC	CAN CHR	CAN Rock	Album
"Baby Please Come Home"	2010	—	34	—	—	A 604 Records Christmas
"Hush" (with Emily Osment)	2011	90	—	36	—	Non-album singles
"We Should Be Friends"	2018	—	—	—	—	Non-album singles
"Lady Mine" (with Chad Kroeger)	2021	—	—	—	47	The Josh Ramsay Show
"Best of Me" (featuring Dallas Smith)	2022	—	—	—	—	The Josh Ramsay Show
"Can't Give It Up" (featuring Tyler Shaw)	2022	—	—	—	—	The Josh Ramsay Show
"Perfect Mistake" (featuring Ria Mae)	2023	—	—	—	—	The Josh Ramsay Show
"—" denotes releases that did not chart.

==== As featured artist ====
List of singles, with selected chart positions and certifications
Title	Year	Peak chart positions			Certification	Album
Title	Year	CAN	CAN HAC	CAN CHR	Certification	Album
"Sour Candy" (Carly Rae Jepsen featuring Josh Ramsay)	2009	—	36	—		Tug of War
"Hit Me Up" (Danny Fernandes featuring Josh Ramsay and Belly)	2011	22	22	13	MC: Platinum	AutomaticLUV
"—" denotes releases that did not chart.

=== Other appearances ===
Title	Year	Artist	Album	Notes
"Always You"	2000	Brian "Hoot" Gibson	Air Bud 3: World Pup Soundtrack	Vocals
"Beautiful Blue"	2002	Holly McNarland	Home Is Where My Feet Are	Backing vocals
"Give Him Up"	2009	Faber Drive	Can't Keep A Secret	Songwriter
"Forever"	2009	Faber Drive	Can't Keep A Secret	Songwriter
"Wavin' Flag"	2010	Young Artists for Haiti	Charity single	Backing vocals
"Witness"	2010	Jakalope	Things That Go Jump In The Night	Songwriter and backing vocals
"Hate Love"	2010	Girlicious	Rebuilt	Songwriter and producer
"Passenger Window"	2011	Melissa Rae Barrie	Breakaway	Songwriter, producer, drums, guitar, bass, keyboards, backing vocals
"Call Me Maybe"	2011	Carly Rae Jepsen	Curiosity	Songwriter and producer, guitars, bass, backing vocals
"Landslide"	2011	Matt Webb	Coda and Jacket	Songwriter, producer, mixer, programmer, drummer
"Stage I Remember"	2011	Matt Webb	Coda and Jacket	Songwriter, producer, backing-vocal, mixer, programmer, drummer
"Guitar String / Wedding Ring"	2012	Carly Rae Jepsen	Kiss	Songwriter and producer
"Drama Queen"	2012	Suzie McNeil	Dear Love	Songwriter and producer
"Tough Love (featuring Anami Vice)"	2012	Suzie McNeil	Dear Love	Songwriter and producer
"Take Your Shirt Off"	2012	Anami Vice	Are You Serious	Producer
"Here's to the Times"	2012	By Starlight	Antics	Producer
"Save Your Breath"	2013	Jessica Lee	"Carried Away"	Songwriter and producer
"Stop and Go"	2013	Jessica Lee	"Carried Away"	Songwriter and producer
"Satellite"	2014	Nickelback	No Fixed Address	Songwriter and backing vocals
"She Keeps Me Up"	2014	Nickelback	No Fixed Address	Songwriter, backing vocals, and guitar
"Story of Another Us"	2015	5 Seconds of Summer	Sounds Good Feels Good	Songwriter
"Lean On"	2020	ArtistsCAN		Backing vocals

== Filmography ==
Television
Year	Title	Role	Notes
2006	Kyle XY	Performance with Marianas Trench	Season 2 Episode 3 – "The List is Life"
2007	Social Code - "He Said, She Said"	Baseball player	Music Video
2007	Video on Trial	Judge	2 episodes
2010	The Next Star	Vocal Coach	4 episodes
2012	Born to Be: Marianas Trench	Himself	MuchMusic documentary
2012–2013	Today's Top 10	Co-Host	3 Episodes

== Awards and nominations ==
Year	Association	Category	Nominated work	Result	Ref.
2013	INDIES.ca: Independent Music Awards	Songwriter of the Year	Himself	Won	
