= Carly Rae Jepsen discography =

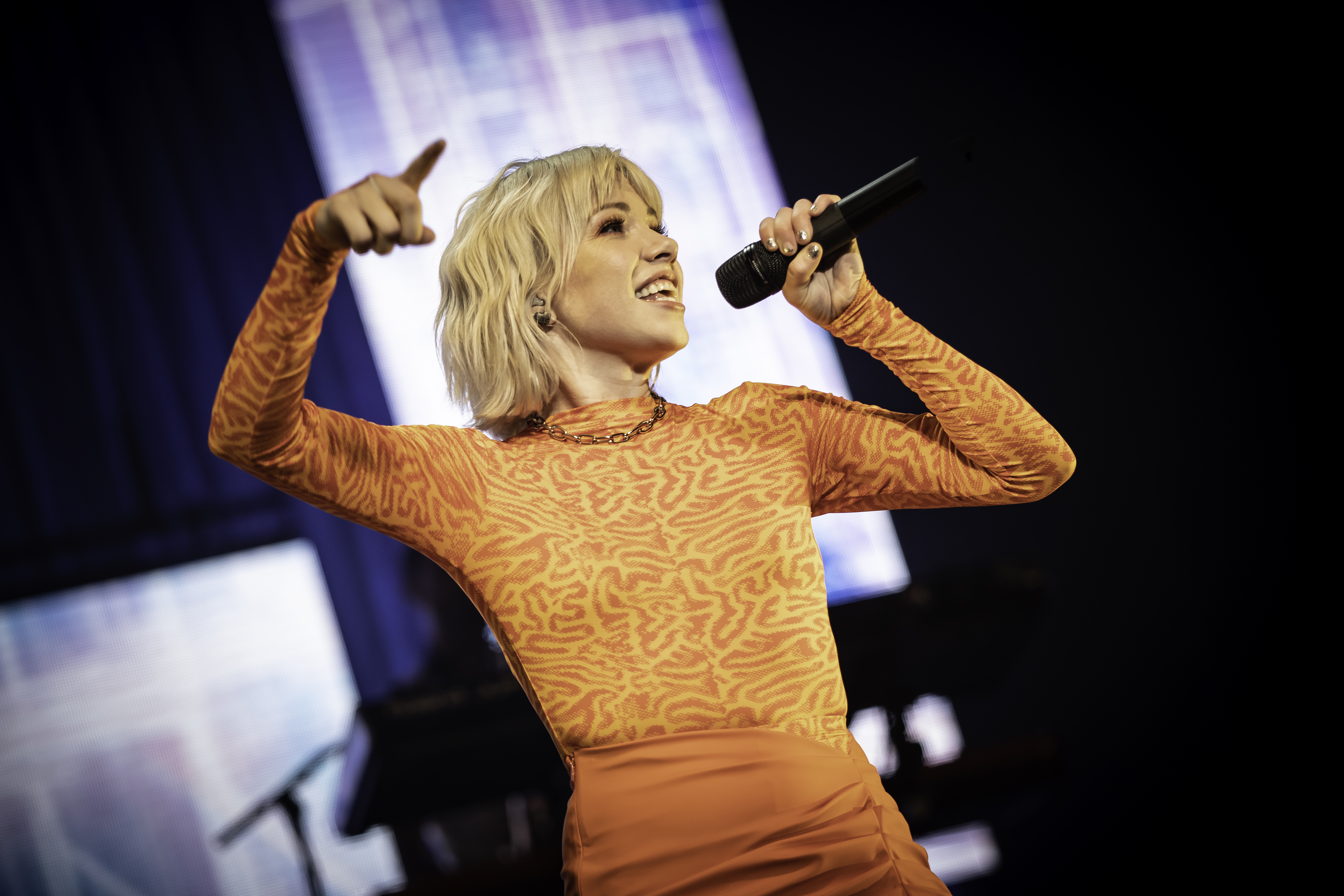
- Jepsen performing in 2019
- Studio albums: 8
- Extended plays: 3
- Singles: 38
- Music videos: 27
- Remix albums: 2
- Promotional singles: 14

Canadian singer and songwriter Carly Rae Jepsen has released eight studio albums, two remix albums, three extended plays (EPs), 38 singles, 14 promotional singles, and 27 music videos. According to Recording Industry Association of America, Jepsen has sold 13 million digital singles in the United States. In 2007, Jepsen finished third in the fifth season of the talent series Canadian Idol. She subsequently signed a recording contract with Fontana and MapleMusic.

Tug of War, her debut album, was released in September 2008. The album spawned four singles, with two being Canadian Hot 100 top 40 singles, "Tug of War" and "Bucket", both of which were accredited gold certifications by Music Canada (MC). Her second album, Kiss, was released in September 2012. "Call Me Maybe", also the lead single from her 2012 EP Curiosity, attained international success, reaching number one in Canada, Australia, the United Kingdom and the United States, among others. Curiosity went on peak at number six on the Canadian Albums Chart. Its title track was released as its second single, peaking at number 18 in Canada. The same year, she and Owl City released single "Good Time". It topped the charts in Canada and New Zealand and reached the top ten in several other countries, including Australia, Ireland, United Kingdom and the United States.

Jepsen's third album, Emotion, was released in 2015 and is influenced by songs from the 1980s. Its lead single "I Really Like You", peaked at number 14 in Canada and attained top five positions in Japan and the UK. The album produced three further singles: "Run Away with Me", "Your Type" and "Boy Problems". In August 2016, Jepsen released Emotion: Side B, an EP containing eight cut tracks from Emotion. The EP received critical acclaim from Rolling Stone and Pitchfork. In May 2017, Jepsen released the single "Cut to the Feeling" which appeared on a Japanese deluxe version of the Side B EP.

Her fourth album, Dedicated, was released in 2019 and included the singles "Party for One", "Now That I Found You", "No Drug Like Me", "Julien", "Too Much" and "Want You in My Room". A companion album Dedicated Side B was released the following year, containing twelve additional unreleased tracks from Dedicated. Jepsen's sixth studio album The Loneliest Time was written and later released in 2022. It includes the singles "Western Wind", "Beach House", "Talking to Yourself" and the title track featuring fellow Canadian musician Rufus Wainwright. A companion album The Loveliest Time was released in 2023, which includes the single "Shy Boy".

== Albums ==
=== Studio albums ===
List of studio albums, with selected chart positions, sales figures and certifications
Title	Album details	Peak chart positions										Sales	Certifications
Title	Album details	CAN	AUS	BEL (FL)	GER	JPN	NZ	SPA	SWI	UK	US	Sales	Certifications
Tug of War	Released: September 30, 2008; Label: Fontana, MapleMusic, 604; Formats: CD, LP, digital download, streaming	—	—	—	—	—	—	—	—	—	—	CAN: 10,000 (Note: Sales of Tug of War in Canada as of June 2012.)	
Kiss	Released: September 18, 2012; Label: 604, Schoolboy, Interscope; Formats: CD, LP, digital download, streaming	5	8	15	22	4	6	20	18	9	6	JPN: 242,000 (Note: Sales of Kiss in Japan as of December 2013.); US: 300,000 (Note: Sales of Kiss in the United States as of August 2015.)	MC: Gold; ARIA: Gold; BPI: Silver; RIAJ: Platinum; RMNZ: 2× Platinum
Emotion	Released: June 24, 2015; Label: 604, Schoolboy, Interscope; Formats: CD, LP, digital download, streaming	8	37	59	73	8	35	45	93	21	16	US: 36,000	RIAJ: Gold
Dedicated	Released: May 17, 2019; Label: 604, Schoolboy, Interscope; Formats: CD, cassette, digital download, LP, streaming	16	33	—	—	32	40	—	71	26	18	US: 13,000	
Dedicated Side B	Released: May 21, 2020; Label: 604, Schoolboy, Interscope; Formats: CD, cassette, digital download, LP, streaming	58	—	—	—	60	—	—	—	42	— (Note: Dedicated Side B did not enter the US Billboard 200, but did peak at number 22 on the Top Album Sales chart.)		
The Loneliest Time	Released: October 21, 2022; Label: 604, Schoolboy, Interscope; Formats: CD, cassette, digital download, LP, streaming	18	62	180	— (Note: The Loneliest Time did not enter the German Albums Chart, but did peak at number 39 on the German Digital Albums chart.)	52	37	94	—	16	19		
The Loveliest Time	Released: July 28, 2023; Label: 604, Schoolboy, Interscope; Formats: CD, digital download, LP, streaming	—	—	—	— (Note: The Loveliest Time did not enter the German Albums Chart, but did peak at number 63 on the German Digital Albums chart.)	—	—	—	—	— (Note: The Loveliest Time did not enter the UK Albums Chart, but did peak at number 39 on the UK Albums Sales chart.)	— (Note: The Loveliest Time did not enter the US Billboard 200, but did peak at number 32 on the Top Album Sales chart.)		
Day and Night	Released: September 18, 2026; Label: Schoolboy, Interscope; Formats: CD, digital download, LP, streaming	59	31	59	45	— (Note: Day and Night did not enter the Oricon Albums Chart, but did peak at number 77 on the Japanese Top Albums Sales chart.)	—	81	—	86	29		
"—" denotes a recording that did not chart in that territory.

== Extended plays ==
List of extended plays, with selected chart positions
Title	Extended play details	Peak chart positions						Sales
Title	Extended play details	CAN	AUS	JPN	NZ Heat	UK	US	Sales
Curiosity	Released: February 14, 2012; Label: 604; Formats: CD, digital download, streaming	6	—	—	—	—	—	
Emotion: Side B	Released: August 26, 2016; Label: 604, Schoolboy, Interscope; Format: CD, LP, digital download, streaming	55	74	37	8	182	62	US: 7,000
Spotify Singles	Released: October 2, 2019; Label: 604, Schoolboy, Interscope; Format: Streaming	—	—	—	—	—	—	
"—" denotes a recording that did not chart in that territory.

== Singles ==
=== As lead artist ===
List of singles as lead artist, with selected chart positions and certifications, showing year released and album name
Title	Year	Peak chart positions										Certifications	Album
Title	Year	CAN	AUS	BEL	DEN	FRA	IRE	JPN	NZ	UK	US	Certifications	Album
"Sunshine on My Shoulders"	2008	— (Note: "Sunshine on My Shoulders" did not enter the Billboard Canadian Hot 100, but peaked at number 21 on the Canada Emerging Artists chart.)	—	—	—	—	—	—	—	—	—		Tug of War
"Tug of War"	2008	36	—	—	—	—	—	—	—	—	—	MC: Gold	Tug of War
"Bucket"	2009	32	—	—	—	—	—	—	—	—	—	MC: Gold	Tug of War
"Sour Candy" (featuring Josh Ramsay)	2009	— (Note: "Sour Candy" did not enter the Billboard Canadian Hot 100, but peaked at number 19 on the Canada Emerging Artists chart.)	—	—	—	—	—	—	—	—	—		Tug of War
"Call Me Maybe"	2011	1	1	2	1	1	1	3	1	1	1	MC: Diamond; ARIA: 15× Platinum; BEA: Platinum; BPI: 5× Platinum; BVMI: 5× Gold; IFPI DEN: 4× Platinum; RIAA: Diamond; RIAJ: Million; RMNZ: 7× Platinum	Curiosity and Kiss
"Curiosity"	2012	18	—	—	—	—	—	—	—	—	—	MC: Gold	Curiosity
"Good Time" (with Owl City) (Note: Also appears on Owl City's album The Midsummer Station.)	2012	1	5	6	17	4	6	2	1	5	8	ARIA: 4× Platinum; BEA: Gold; BPI: Platinum; BVMI: Gold; IFPI DEN: 2× Platinum; RIAA: 2× Platinum; RIAJ: 2× Platinum; RMNZ: 3× Platinum	Kiss
"This Kiss"	2012	23	—	— (Note: "This Kiss" did not enter either Ultratop 50 chart, but reached number one on the Ultratip Flanders extension chart.)	—	152	64	65	39	166	86		Kiss
"Tonight I'm Getting Over You" (solo or featuring Nicki Minaj)	2013	88	38	— (Note: "Tonight I'm Getting Over You" did not enter either Ultratop 50 chart, but reached number six on the Ultratip Flanders and Wallonia extension charts.)	27	82	32	—	40	33	90	IFPI DEN: Gold	Kiss
"Take a Picture"	2013	—	—	—	—	—	—	—	—	—	—		Non-album single
"I Really Like You"	2015	14	37	43	7	39	3	4	25	3	39	MC: Gold; ARIA: Platinum; BPI: Platinum; BVMI: Gold; IFPI DEN: Platinum; RIAA: Platinum; RIAJ: 2× Platinum; RMNZ: Platinum	Emotion
"All That"	2015	—	—	—	—	—	—	—	—	—	—		Emotion
"Emotion"	2015	—	—	—	—	—	—	—	—	—	—		Emotion
"Run Away with Me"	2015	83	100	—	—	164	82	—	—	58	—	BPI: Silver; RMNZ: Gold	Emotion
"Warm Blood"	2015	—	—	—	—	—	—	—	—	—	—		Emotion
"Making the Most of the Night"	2015	—	—	—	—	—	—	—	—	—	—		Emotion
"Your Type"	2015	— (Note: "Your Type" did not enter the Billboard Canadian Hot 100, but peaked at number 33 on the Canada All-Format Airplay chart.)	—	—	—	—	—	—	—	—	—		Emotion
"Last Christmas"	2015	—	—	21	—	—	—	—	—	—	—		Non-album single
"Boy Problems"	2016	—	—	—	—	—	—	—	—	—	—		Emotion
"Cut to the Feeling"	2017	— (Note: "Cut to the Feeling" did not enter the Billboard Canadian Hot 100, but peaked at number 33 on the Canadian Digital Song Sales chart.)	—	61	—	—	—	13	—	—	— (Note: "Cut to the Feeling" did not enter the US Billboard Hot 100, but peaked at number 44 on the Digital Song Sales chart.)	BPI: Silver; RIAJ: Gold; RMNZ: Gold	Emotion: Side B+
"Party for One"	2018	100	— (Note: "Party for One" did not enter the Top 100 Singles Chart, but peaked at number 48 on the ARIA Digital Track Chart.)	—	—	—	98	68	— (Note: "Party for One" did not enter the NZ Top 40 Singles Chart, but peaked at number 19 on the NZ Hot Singles Chart.)	—	—		Dedicated
"Now That I Found You"	2019	—	—	—	—	—	—	44	—	—	—		Dedicated
"No Drug Like Me"	2019	—	—	—	—	—	—	—	—	—	—		Dedicated
"Julien"	2019	—	—	—	—	—	—	—	—	—	—		Dedicated
"Too Much"	2019	—	—	—	—	—	—	—	—	—	—		Dedicated
"Want You in My Room"	2019	—	—	—	—	—	—	—	—	—	—		Dedicated
"OMG" (with Gryffin)	2019	—	—	—	—	—	—	—	— (Note: "OMG" did not enter the NZ Top 40 Singles Chart, but peaked at number 19 on the NZ Hot Singles Chart.)	—	—		Gravity
"It's Not Christmas Till Somebody Cries"	2020	—	—	—	—	—	—	—	—	—	—		Non-album single
"Western Wind"	2022	—	—	—	—	—	—	— (Note: "Western Wind" did not enter the Billboard Japan Hot 100 chart, but peaked at number 11 on the Billboard Japan Hot Overseas Songs chart.)	—	—	—		The Loneliest Time
"Beach House"	2022	—	—	—	—	—	—	— (Note: "Beach House" did not enter the Billboard Japan Hot 100 chart, but peaked at number 11 on the Billboard Japan Hot Overseas Songs chart.)	—	—	—		The Loneliest Time
"Talking to Yourself"	2022	—	—	—	—	—	—	— (Note: "Talking to Yourself" did not enter the Billboard Japan Hot 100 chart, but peaked at number eight on the Billboard Japan Hot Overseas Songs chart.)	—	—	—		The Loneliest Time
"The Loneliest Time" (featuring Rufus Wainwright)	2022	—	—	—	—	—	—	— (Note: "The Loneliest Time" did not enter the Billboard Japan Hot 100 chart, but peaked at number 16 on the Billboard Japan Hot Overseas Songs chart.)	—	—	—		The Loneliest Time
"Shy Boy"	2023	—	—	—	—	—	—	— (Note: "Shy Boy" did not enter the Billboard Japan Hot 100 chart, but peaked at number five on the Billboard Japan Hot Overseas Songs chart.)	—	—	—		The Loveliest Time
"More"	2026	—	—	—	—	—	—	— (Note: "More" did not enter the Billboard Japan Hot 100 chart, but peaked at number nine on the Billboard Japan Hot Overseas Songs chart.)	—	—	—		Emotion (10th Anniversary Edition)
"On Wires"	2026	—	—	—	—	—	—	—	—	—	—		Day and Night
"After All"	2026	—	—	—	—	—	—	— (Note: "After All" did not enter the Billboard Japan Hot 100 chart, but peaked at number nine on the Billboard Japan Hot Overseas Songs chart.)	—	—	—		Day and Night
"Don't Leave Me on the Dance Floor"	2026	—	—	—	—	—	—	— (Note: "Don't Leave Me on the Dancefloor" did not enter the Billboard Japan Hot 100 chart, but peaked at number 10 on the Billboard Japan Hot Overseas Songs chart.)	— (Note: "Don't Leave Me on the Dancefloor" did not enter the NZ Top 40 Singles Chart, but peaked at number 29 on the NZ Hot Singles Chart.)	—	—		Day and Night
"Motivation"	2026	—	—	—	—	—	—	— (Note: "Motivation" did not enter the Billboard Japan Hot 100 chart, but peaked at number 17 on the Billboard Japan Hot Overseas Songs chart.)	—	—	—		Day and Night
"—" denotes items which did not chart in that country.

=== As featured artist ===
Title	Year	Album
"Rest from the Streets" (A Friend in London featuring Carly Rae Jepsen)	2013	Unite
"Love Me Like That" (The Knocks featuring Carly Rae Jepsen)	2016	55
"Super Natural" (Danny L Harle featuring Carly Rae Jepsen)	2016	PC Music Volume 2
"Lalala (Remix)" (Y2K, bbno$ featuring Enrique Iglesias and Carly Rae Jepsen)	2019	Non-album single
"Ok on Your Own" (Mxmtoon featuring Carly Rae Jepsen)	2020	Dusk
"Rare" (Bullion featuring Carly Rae Jepsen)	2024	Affection

=== Promotional singles ===
Title	Year	Peaks	Album
Title	Year	JPN	Album
"Both Sides Now"	2012	—	Curiosity
"Almost Said It"	2012	—	Kiss
"Picture"	2013	—	Kiss
"Part of Your World"	2013	—	The Little Mermaid Greatest Hits
"Everywhere You Look"	2016	—	Non-album single
"First Time"	2016	71	Emotion Remixed +
"It Takes Two (with Lil Yachty & Mike Will Made It)"	2017		Non-album single
"Feels Right" (Pride Remix) (featuring Josh Alexander and Electric Guest)	2019	—	Dedicated
"The Sound" (live)	2019	—	Dedicated
"Let's Be Friends" (Note: "Let’s Be Friends" is only included on the Japanese edition of Dedicated Side B)	2020	—	Dedicated Side B
"Move Me" (with Lewis OfMan)	2022	—	Non-album single
"Shadow"	2023	—	The Loveliest Time
"Guardian Angel"	2025	—	Emotion (10th Anniversary Edition)
"Disco Darling"	2026	—	Non-album single
"—" denotes a recording that did not chart in that territory.

== Other charted songs ==
Title	Year	Peak chart positions										Album
Title	Year	CAN	CAN AC	AUS	DEN	FRA	IRE	NZ Hot	UK	US	US Dance	Album
"Mittens"	2010	—	26	—	—	—	—	—	—	—	—	A 604 Records Christmas
"Let It Snow"	2011	—	17	—	—	—	—	—	—	—	—	A 604 Records Christmas: The Second Noel
"Beautiful" (with Justin Bieber)	2012	37	—	48	37	184	87	—	68	87	—	Kiss
"This Love Isn't Crazy"	2020	—	—	—	—	—	—	39	—	—	—	Dedicated Side B
"Surrender My Heart"	2022	—	—	—	—	—	—	33	—	—	—	The Loneliest Time
"Kamikaze"	2023	—	—	—	—	—	—	—	—	—	40	The Loveliest Time
"Kollage"	2023	—	—	—	—	—	—	31	—	—	—	The Loveliest Time
"Psychedelic Switch"	2023	—	—	—	—	—	—	—	—	—	29	The Loveliest Time
"—" denotes a recording that did not chart.

== Guest appearances ==
List of non-single guest appearances, showing other artist(s), year released and album name
Title	Year	Other artist(s)	Album
"Change for You"	2009	The Midway State	Holes
"Mittens"	2010	—N/a	A 604 Records Christmas
"Let It Snow"	2011	—N/a	604 Records: The Second Noel
"Where Did We Go?"	2012	Andrew Allen	Non-album song
"Rest from the Streets"	2013	A Friend in London	Unite
"Shadow"	2015	Bleachers	Terrible Thrills, Vol. 2
"Love Me Like That" (The Knocks 55.5 VIP Mix)	2016	The Knocks	55.5
"Better Than Me"	2016	Blood Orange	Freetown Sound
"Runaways"	2017	—N/a	Non-album song for the film Ballerina
"Hate That You Know Me"	2017	Bleachers	Gone Now
"Shadow"	2017	Bleachers	MTV Unplugged
"Hate That You Know Me" (with Lorde)	2017	Bleachers	MTV Unplugged
"Trouble in the Streets"	2017	BC Unidos	Bicycle
"Backseat"	2017	Charli XCX	Pop 2

== Music videos ==
Title	Year	Director(s)	Ref.
"Tug of War"	2009	Ben Knetchtel	
"Bucket"	2009	Ben Knetchtel	
"Sour Candy" (featuring Josh Ramsay)	2009	Ben Knetchtel	
"Call Me Maybe"	2012	Ben Knetchtel	
"Curiosity" (unreleased)	2012	Colin Minihan	
"Good Time" (with Owl City)	2012	Declan Whitebloom	
"This Kiss"	2012	Justin Francis	
"Tonight I'm Getting Over You"	2013	Nathalie Canguilhem	
"Part of Your World"	2013	Unknown	
"I Really Like You"	2015	Peter Glanz	
"Run Away With Me"	2015	David Kalani Larkins	
"Your Type"	2015	Gia Coppola, David Kalani Larkins	
"Boy Problems"	2016	Petra Collins	
"Super Natural" (Danny L Harle featuring Carly Rae Jepsen)	2016	Bradley Bell, Pablo Soler	
"It Takes Two" (with Mike Will Made It and Lil Yachty)	2017	Roman Coppola	
"Cut to the Feeling"	2017	Gia Coppola	
"Party for One"	2018	Bardia Zeinali	
"Now That I Found You"	2019	Carlos Lopez Estrada, Nelson de Castro	
"Too Much"	2019	Amy Davis, Matty Peacock	
"Want You in My Room"	2019	Andrew Donoho	
"OMG" (with Gryffin)	2019	Atlas Acopian	
"Me and the Boys in the Band"	2020	Jake Chamseddine	
"It's Not Christmas Till Somebody Cries"	2020	Josh Forbes	
"Western Wind"	2022	Taylor Fauntleroy	
"Beach House"	2022	Taylor Fauntleroy	
"The Loneliest Time" (featuring Rufus Wainwright)	2022	Brantley Gutierrez	
"Surrender My Heart"	2022	Brantley Gutierrez	
"On Wires"	2026	Caio Vieira	
"After All"	2026	Aerin Moreno	
"Don’t Leave Me on the Dance Floor"	2026	Jeremy O. Harris	
