= Want You in My Room =

2019 single by Carly Rae Jepsen

Single by Carly Rae Jepsen

from the album Dedicated
- Released: May 17, 2019
- Genre: Pop; synth-pop; electropop
- Length: 2:46
- Label: 604 Records; School Boy; Interscope
- Songwriters: Carly Rae Jepsen; Jack Antonoff; Tavish Crowe
- Producer: Jack Antonoff

Carly Rae Jepsen singles chronology
"Too Much" (2019)	"Want You in My Room" (2019)	"OMG" (2019)

Music video
- "Want You in My Room" on YouTube

"Want You in My Room" is a song by Canadian singer and songwriter Carly Rae Jepsen from her fourth studio album, Dedicated. Jepsen wrote it with Tavish Crowe and its producer, Jack Antonoff. Conceived as a song about sex, the singer described it as her first to address the subject explicitly. Antonoff, whose vocals are featured on the track via vocoder, incorporated unconventional production choices such as shout-talking, a saxophone solo, and a delayed fade-out, to create a playful and captivating energy. The song was released as a single on May 17, 2019, the same day as the album's release.

Musically, "Want You in My Room" is a pop, synth-pop, and electropop song heavily inspired by 1980s music. Its lyrics describe Jepsen inviting a romantic partner to join her in bed and have been described as among the most sexually suggestive of her career, attracting considerable attention from music critics. Reviewers frequently singled out the song as an album highlight, praising its catchiness, songwriting, and Antonoff's production, although some felt the production overshadowed Jepsen's performance. The song also appeared on several publications' year-end lists of the best songs of 2019 and has been ranked highly among Jepsen's songs. A music video directed by Andrew Donoho was released on September 19, 2019, which depicts Jepsen preparing for a date in a surreal, pastel-colored setting.

Jepsen has described “Want You in My Room” as one of her favorite songs to perform live. She has performed it at several live events and throughout her Dedicated (2019-2020) and The So Nice (2022-2023) tours, which supported the albums of the same names.

== Writing and production ==
Canadian singer-songwriter Carly Rae Jepsen wrote “Want You in My Room” with Jack Antonoff and Tavish Crowe; Antonoff also produced the track. Jepsen said the song began with a visual process she uses to write her albums, in which she arranges songs on poster boards and writes a word next to each one describing its subject. She wrote “Sex” next to “Want You in My Room”, and later explained that it was rare for her songs to be summarized so simply. The singer noted that although she had alluded to sex in her earlier music, “Want You in My Room” was arguably her most explicit song on the subject. She described it as the most direct song she had been involved in writing and performing. Musically, she drew inspiration from 1980s artists such as Squeeze and Cyndi Lauper, and considered the song an opportunity to explore a bold side of her personality that she typically reserves for private moments.

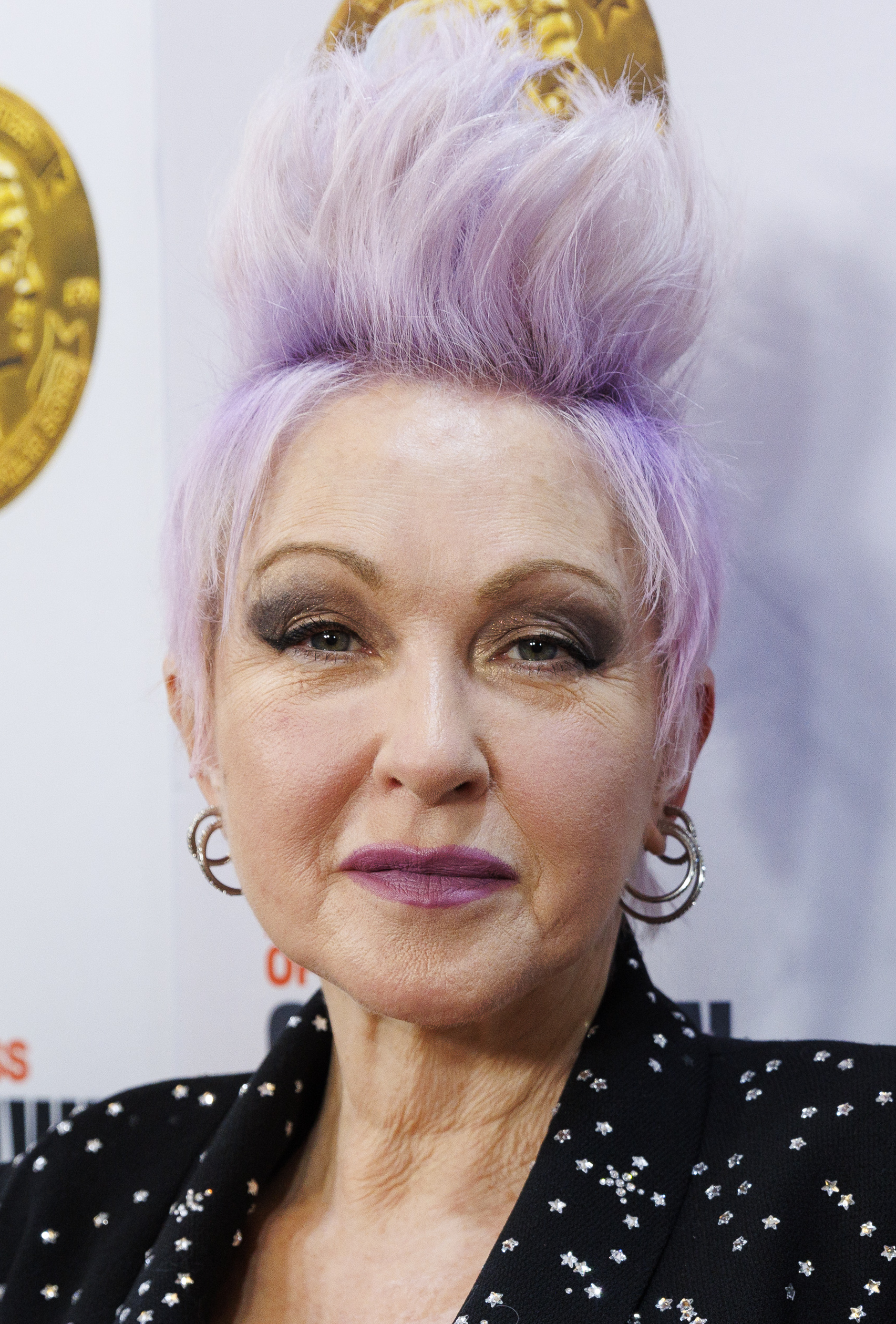
Cyndi Lauper (pictured 2023) was one of the artists whose work inspired "Want You in My Room".

For her fourth studio album, Dedicated, Jepsen wanted to deviate from the typical Los Angeles pop songwriting scene and sought out Antonoff in New York, where they wrote “Want You in My Room”. Antonoff recalled that the song originated during one of their early writing sessions. Jepsen repurposed the pre-chorus from an earlier song she had worked on with Crowe called "Four Leaf Clover". Although she ultimately disliked that song, she saw potential in its melody, which Antonoff reworked to suit the new song's meaning. For "Want You in My Room", he experimented with a LinnDrum drum machine and a Binson tape echo, before the pair began playing guitar and exchanging vocals. The track took shape once he added a vocoder, which allowed him to deliver its lyrics using a persona he typically would not adopt. Antonoff attributed the song's playfulness to unusual production choices, saying that its unconventional beat encouraged them to experiment with shout-talking, a 1950s girl group influence, and other unexpected elements. He also added a belated saxophone solo intended to evoke singer David Bowie's song “Young Americans” (1975), which was played by Antonoff's Bleachers bandmate Evan Smith. Antonoff said he preferred the song's delayed fade-out to the contemporary emphasis on immediately capturing listeners' attention, noting that the timing of the fade-out gives the impression that the song continues beyond what is heard.

On collaborating with Antonoff for “Want You in My Room”, Jepsen described their dynamic as fun and experimental. She said their friendship made him someone she felt comfortable sharing its potentially silly lyrics with to see whether they would work, and recalled both of them dancing and shouting as they exchanged lyrics until the song was finished. Although the pair wrote “an entire record’s worth of material” together, “Want You in My Room” was the only song they co-wrote that made the final track listing of the original album. However, Jepsen admitted that “Want You in My Room” nearly did not make the album altogether.

On April 17, 2019, Jepsen tweeted the official track listing and release date for Dedicated, confirming "Want You in My Room" as its fourth track. "Want You in My Room" was released as a single by 604 Records on May 17, 2019, and later through Schoolboy Records and Interscope Records on September 19.

== Music and lyrics ==
"Want You in My Room" is a pop, synth-pop, and electropop song, with 1980s-inspired production and instrumentation. At two minutes and forty-six seconds (2:46) long, the track is built around a "sweeping" musical arrangement, "grinding" bassline, and "jubilant" instrumentation. Ellen Johnson of Paste felt that the song draws inspiration from virtually “every age of pop”, citing new wave, 1990s dance-pop, The Bangles, Daft Punk, and the latter's use of AutoTune as potential influences. Elsewhere, critics cited traces of pop rock, late-1990s teen pop, and bubblegum music. Its introduction consists of bass and percussion instruments. After opening with drums over a distinctly 1980s-sounding rhythm, the song employs "booming" synth drums, guitars, and electric guitars, with chorus pedals amplifying the guitars, and reverb applied throughout. The arrangement builds from breathy verses expressing romantic longing to an exuberant chorus, where the singer's coyness gives way to more direct expressions of desire. Throughout its pre-chorus and chorus, including the more emphatic repetition of the latter, the song maintains a "rolling thunder" energy. The song ultimately fades out into a saxophone solo that recalls the launch of Jepsen's Emotion (2015) era. The Atlantic critic Spencer Kornhaber described its soundscape as embracing “uncool sounds for kooky fun”, likening it to a romantic comedy. Daisy Jones of British GQ said “Want You in My Room”'s production exemplifies what music critics have coined "the Jack Antonoff sound”. Some critics found it reminiscent of the musician's work with singers Lorde and Taylor Swift; others compared it to songs by Charli XCX and Electric Light Orchestra. Vocally, the song uses stacked harmonies and a coy, rap-style delivery to convey lust. In a call-and-response style critics found reminiscent of girl groups, Jepsen's “airy” vocals are echoed by Antonoff's own vocoder-processed voice, giving the song characteristics of a duet and cheer squad. The digitized vocals sound both retro and futuristic, making their specific era difficult to determine. Jepsen's performance, which the artist herself described as shout-singing, has been likened to the early works of Cyndi Lauper and Madonna, with Fajar Zakhri of The Jakarta Post writing that it "marries crunchy guitar riffs with slightly manic, shrieky vocalizing". Her layered, "breathy" vocals enhance the sensuality of the song, which Halle Weber of the Cleveland Scene considered the album's most light-hearted.

Jepsen flirts with a romantic partner on "Want You in My Room", which she described as “very come hither”. Alternating between metaphorical and direct, it narrates sneaking a love interest through a bedroom window. Angela Morrison of Exclaim! observed that windows as entry points are a recurring theme in Jepsen's songs both before and after "Want You in My Room", namely "Sweet Talker" and "Window", from her albums Tug of War (2008) and Dedicated Side B (2020), respectively. In a review of Dedicated Side B for the Daily Nexus, Sam Franzini suggested that some tracks on the album sounded like weaker versions of songs from Dedicated, citing "Window" as a weaker counterpart to "Want You in My Room". Its lyrics evoke late-night yearning through references to open windows, beds and floors, alongside the insistence that the night is not over. According to Jepsen, the opening line compares the feeling of obsessing over someone to a lighthouse beam, as thoughts of the person repeatedly fade before returning moments later. Jepsen casts herself as the lighthouse, reminding her would-be lover of their destination. Bluntly detailing the singer's desires to be physically close to her significant other, the chorus is simple compared to the verses, which explore the desire to close both physical and emotional distance between partners. Jepsen addresses the subject of sex directly rather than relying on the innuendo characteristic of some of her other songs, with lines such as “I wanna do bad things to you / Slide on through my window” and “I want you in my room / Baby, don’t you want me to?”. Variety's Rachel Seo considered the line "I’ll press you to the pages of my heart" its "Modus operandi". Both Daniel Herborn of The Saturday Paper and Ana Monroy Yglesias of Grammy.com interpreted the song as being about feelings toward a crush. On the spoken hook, "I want you in my room / On the bed, on the floor", Jepsen exchanges sexual demands with a robotic-style vocalist. She does not sing the titular line, which is instead performed by electronically manipulated vocals reminiscent of Daft Punk.

Some critics focused heavily on the song's sexual lyrics, with Carl Wilson of Slate suggesting that had Jepsen released it as a single earlier, the song “might have dispelled some of the virginal-flirt associations that still linger round your name”. Rolling Stone considered it “her most directly sexual song to date”, and Claire Lobenfeld of Jezebel called it "one of her most lyrically salacious tracks". Lancaster found it ironic that the song's sexual lyrics had become such a talking point, given that the album was written and performed by an adult woman, theorizing, "perhaps it’s that Jepsen’s repertoire of high-energy songs about crushes and break-ups have locked her into a state of perpetual adolescence". Emily Miller of The Daily Princetonian and writers for CBC Music highlighted Jepsen's assertiveness and control over her desires, with Miller calling "Want You in My Room" an anthem of agency that exemplifies the singer's tendency to pursue what she wants. Mark Yin of Farrago argued that the song expresses lust and desire in a way that feels evolved rather than entirely detached from Jepsen's more innocent previous releases. Kelly Doherty of Nialler9 found self-awareness in Jepsen's sweetness and vocal delivery.

== Critical reception ==
Around the time of its release, several publications such as Complex included "Want You in My Room" on lists of notable songs. The week of its release, Michael Love Michael of Paper named it one of "10 Songs You Need to Start Your Weekend Right", calling it a "pre-Pride Month, sex positive anthem", and Time included it among "5 Songs You Need to Listen to This Weekend". In May 2019, Paste named it one of the 15 best songs of the month, while Chris Azzopardi of QSaltLake already declared it “Song of the Summer”. In July, Stereogum placed the song ninth in its 2019 "Song of the Summer" ranking, while Adrian Horton of The Guardian selected it as their song of the summer for that year.

In reviews of Dedicated, several critics singled out "Want You in My Room" as an album highlight, including Brodie Lancaster of The Saturday Paper and John Murphy of MusicOMH. Ed Condran of The News & Observer identified it as the album's standout track. Sam Van Pykeren of Mother Jones ranked it the second-best song on the Dedicated. James Rettig of Stereogum considered it one of the best songs Jepsen had released to that point, while Luis Paez-Pumar of Defector called it as good as any song on Emotion. Peter Simpson of The Skinny identified "Want You in My Room" as the moment the album's throwback soundscape reaches its "brilliant limit", calling it capable of converting "unsuspecting listeners into dedicated superfans". Others praised its songwriting and catchiness, with Huw Baines of Stereoboard describing "Want You in My Room" as a marvel of construction and hooks. The Independent's Elisa Bray singled it out as Dedicated's most vocally and melodically distinct track. Alex Robert Ross of The Fader, Heather Phares of AllMusic, and Patricia Cárdenas of the Miami New Times each praised "Want You in My Room" for showcasing Jepsen's ability to craft catchy pop songs that convey emotional depth, while Hannah Mylrea of NME said Jepsen "has never sounded better". Antonoff's production was also the subject of commentary. Anna Gaca of Pitchfork called it scene-stealing, and George Fenwick of The New Zealand Herald named it a banger and "a pleasantly weird Jack Antonoff collaboration". Freddie Clark of Redbrick praised Jepsen and Antonoff's "brilliant" work on "Want You in My Room", which the author declared Dedicated's best offering. Cárdenas described his production as captivating and spellbinding. Grace Robins-Somerville of Stereogum, who expressed mixed opinions of Antonoff's work overall, said that “Want You in My Room” was one of the rare instances when he “hits the nail on the head”. Similarly, Kish Lal of The Sydney Morning Herald called it “a rare sonic success” for the producer.

Some reviews were less positive. Natalia Barr of Consequence criticized the song's “childlike tone” in contrast with its sexual content. Both Barr and Lindsay Zoladz of The Ringer felt that on songs such as “Want You in My Room”, Jepsen's vocals and overall presence were obscured by excessive production and vocal effects. Andrew Barker of Variety said the relatively short song nearly collapses under Antonoff's production and hooks, but is ultimately salvaged by its saxophone solo. Rich Juzwiak of Jezebel considered "Want You in My Room" superficial and an example of Jepsen's music lacking specificity, writing that she approached sex “like someone who’s only experienced it through romcoms”. In a lukewarm review, David Levesley of British GQ complimented "Want You in My Room" but felt it leads a section of the record that begins to sound repetitive.

After its release, "Want You in My Room" has become a fan favourite. In a readers' poll compiled by Pitchfork, "Want You in My Room" ranked 33rd among the top 50 songs of 2019. The song was also selected as one of the best tracks of 2019 by a number of The Guardian journalists. Felicity Case-Mejia ranked the song ninth on her list of the top 10 songs of 2019 for The Music. Paste ranked it the 13th-best song of 2019 out of 50, while Rolling Stone ranked it the 32nd best song of 2019. Rachel Seo of Variety ranked the song as Jepsen's third-best, and Ellen Johnson of Paste ranked it fifth. The Guardian ranked it her eighth-best song. CBC Arts ranked "Want You in My Room" 13th among the 37 best songs in Jepsen's discography. Meanwhile, Junkee ranked the song 45th among 82 singles Jepsen had released at the time of the article's publication. In retrospect, Nick Levine of NME named "Want You in My Room" one of Jepsen's best songs that “feel like huge hits even if their actual chart success was modest”. In 2024, Mary Siroky of Consequence ranked “Want You in My Room” as the 21st-best song produced by Antonoff.

== Music video ==
The music video for the song was directed by Andrew Donoho and filmed at the Los Angeles County Arboretum. It premiered on YouTube on September 19, 2019, and was her fourth music video from the album, following the release of visuals for "Now That I Found You", "Too Much", and "Party for One".

Taking place in a pastel-colored universe, the video begins with Jepsen sitting on her bed in her underwear. She finishes a phone conversation with her boyfriend, assuring him that she will be ready in an hour. She then instructs her Google Home Mini to set a timer for an hour, before singing the song into a hairbrush and hopping out of bed. A montage of Jepsen preparing to go out follows, with the singer spending much of the sequence dancing in her underwear as she gets dressed. Jepsen leaves the bedroom, which is depicted as surrealistically disjointed within a green space, and dances toward a nearby vanity mirror, where she reapplies her lipstick. The bedroom is revealed to resemble an outdoor set. Each time she opens the door to her room, she reappears in a different outfit and setting, including a beach, where she dons a pair of Beats by Dre headphones, and the side of a swimming pool. Jepsen wears several outfits throughout the video, including a tulle ensemble paired with a retro baby-blue-and-white swimsuit and a black minidress accessorized with chunky black-and-white earrings. She eventually returns to her bedroom, where she dances to music performed by a her band who have been transfigured into sentient furniture and household items, including a large houseplant, a dresser, and a chair. The video ends with Jepsen's boyfriend arriving at her door with a bouquet of flowers, knocking on the door as the Google Home alarm chimes. Jepsen tosses the flowers aside before pulling him inside by his tie, suggesting that the couple may not be going out after all.

Grace Mayer of The Heights said the video's elements embody “the eclecticism and steadfast peppiness that defines Carly Rae Jepsen”, and Jenny Zheng of Paper said it captures "the butterflies aligned with new romance". The video's product placement also attracted some commentary.

== Live performances ==
Jepsen considers "Want You in My Room" one of her favorite songs to perform live. The singer recorded a stripped-down live version of the song for her Spotify Singles session at Electric Lady Studios in New York City, as well as a cover of No Doubt's "Don't Speak" (1996). Both recordings were released on October 2, 2019. Emily Zemler of Rolling Stone described the Spotify Singles version of "Want You in My Room" as having "a summery calypso vibe". Jepsen released In November 2019, Jepsen performed the song as part of her Tiny Desk Concert for NPR, with bandmate Sophi Bairley providing background vocals. Allison Stubblebine of Nylon said Jepsen's rendition offered "a new side to the synth-laden single and its horny lyrics", describing it as "both adorable and sultry and everything in between". In December of the same year, Jepsen joined Antonoff to perform "Want You in My Room" at the producer's Ally Coalition Talent Show. On July 11, 2022, she performed "Want You in My Room" as part of her set at the annual Somerset House Summer Series in London, England. Alice Vincent of The Daily Telegraph called it "a surprise hit of the night". In July 2023, Jepsen performed "Want You in My Room" as an opening act for Boygenius at the PNE Amphitheatre in Vancouver, British Columbia.

The song opened the second part of Jepsen's Dedicated Tour set in 2019-2020, with the singer wearing a one-piece resembling a runner's uniform patterned with what appeared to be burning embers. Reviewing a performance at the Enmore Theatre in Sydney, Australia, Nick Bond of news.com.au said the song “revealed itself to be an instant Jepsen classic in a live setting”. She also performed the song throughout The So Nice Tour (2022-2023), where "Want You in My Room" appeared in the second act. Reviewing a performance at the Doug Mitchell Thunderbird Sports Centre at the University of British Columbia in Vancouver, British Columbia, Nathan Bawaan of The Ubyssey said that although he usually skipped "Want You in My Room" when it came on his playlist, Jepsen's live rendition gave him a new appreciation for the song.

== Credits and personnel ==
Credits adapted from Apple Music.

- Carly Rae Jepsen – vocals, songwriter
- Jack Antonoff – producer, songwriter, programming, all instruments
- Tavish Crowe – songwriter
- Serban Ghenea – mixing engineer
- John Hanes – mixing engineer
- Laura Sisk – recording engineer
- Gene Grimaldi – mastering engineer
