= Too Much (Carly Rae Jepsen song) =

2019 single by Carly Rae Jepsen

Single by Carly Rae Jepsen

from the album Dedicated
- Released: May 9, 2019
- Genre: Synth-pop
- Length: 3:17
- Label: 604; School Boy; Interscope
- Songwriter(s): Carly Rae Jepsen; John Hill; Jordan Palmer; Noonie Bao; Sammy Leighton Clay
- Producer(s): John Hill; Jordan Palmer

Carly Rae Jepsen singles chronology
"Julien" (2019)	"Too Much" (2019)	"Want You in My Room" (2019)

Music video
- "Too Much" on YouTube

"Too Much" is a song by Canadian singer Carly Rae Jepsen, released as a single from her fourth studio album, Dedicated, on May 9, 2019, through 604, School Boy and Interscope Records. Jepsen co-wrote the song with John Hill, Jordan Palmer and Noonie Bao. The song's music video was released on May 17, 2019. "Too Much" was placed at #7 on Time's list of 10 Best Songs of 2019.

== Background ==
"Too Much" was co-written by Jepsen with John Hill, Jordan Palmer and Noonie Bao, and produced by Hill and Palmer. It is a mid-tempo synth-pop song. Critics also noted the song's references to reggae and disco. Jepsen revealed that the lyrics were inspired by a story of a girlfriend of hers, and described the track as "very self-reflective. It explores (...) the insecurity of what it is to be too much for someone: too emotional, too crazy, too loud, too other things", but also expresses that "too much is not really a bad thing for the right person".

The song was released on May 9, 2019, as the final single preceding Dedicated.

== Critical reception ==
Keely Quinlan of Stereogum called it a "bopping strut of a pop song", saying it "opens up a little slower and quieter than the others with a leading synth melody", but builds into having "a dance floor ready feel, which is what Jepsen always does best". Claire Shaffer of Rolling Stone wrote that the song is a "steamy dance track over a single electronic beat, and deals with a classic CRJ theme". Writing for Time, Raisa Bruner described it as "[b]ubbly, breathy and winningly honest", and ranked it as one of the contenders for the Song of Summer 2019.

"Too Much" was named the best song on Dedicated by Sam Van Pykeren of Mother Jones. It was also selected as one of the best tracks of 2019 by a number of The Guardian journalists.

=== Year-end lists ===
Publication	Year	Accolade	Rank	Ref.
Billboard	2019	25 Best Songs of 2019	15	
Time	2019	10 Best Songs of 2019	7	

== Music video ==
The music video for the song was directed by Matty Peacock and Amy David. It begins with Jepsen sitting in a room on a rainy day, playing synthesizer. She is then pictures watching TV on a sofa, when the room fills up with her lookalikes, all wearing blonde wigs and outfits matching hers. Jepsen and the girls proceed to rearrange furniture in the room and perform dance routines. They then sit down to a tea party but eventually start throwing pastries around the room.

== Live performances ==
Jepsen performed "Too Much" for the first time on The Late Late Show with James Corden on May 16, 2019. The song was performed live throughout The Dedicated Tour.

== Track listing ==
- Streaming
1. "Too Much" – 3:17
2. "Julien" – 3:54
3. "No Drug Like Me" – 3:28
4. "Now That I Found You" – 3:20
5. "Party for One" – 3:04

== Charts ==
Chart performance for "Too Much"
Chart (2019)	Peak position
China Airplay/FL (Billboard)	36
Taiwan Top 10	1

== Release history ==
Release dates and formats for "Too Much"
Region	Date	Format	Label	Ref.
Russia	June 12, 2019	Radio airplay	Universal	
