= Let's Be Friends (Carly Rae Jepsen song) =

Single by Carly Rae Jepsen

from the album Dedicated Side B (Japanese version)
- Released: February 7, 2020
- Length: 3:10
- Label: 604; School Boy; Interscope
- Songwriter(s): Ben Romans; Carly Rae Jepsen; Christopher J Baran
- Producer(s): CJ Baran; Ben Romans

Carly Rae Jepsen singles chronology
"Lalala" (Remix) (2019)	"Let's Be Friends" (2020)	"Ok on Your Own" (2020)

Lyric video
- "Let's Be Friends" on YouTube

"Let's Be Friends" is a song by Canadian singer Carly Rae Jepsen, released on February 7, 2020. It was included on the Japanese version of her fifth studio album, Dedicated Side B (2020).

== Background ==
Jepsen announced the song on social media on February 5, 2020, announcing the title as "Let's Be Friends (Not Really Though)" and sharing its cover art; however, the song was released on streaming services with a shortened title and different cover.

== Critical reception ==
Eric Torres of Pitchfork wrote that the song "doesn’t reach the potent highs of her other work, but as an upbeat one-off that takes pleasure in excising dirtbags from your life, it nails its specific mood".

== Personnel ==
Credits adapted from Tidal.

- Carly Rae Jepsen – songwriting, lead vocals
- Ben Romans – songwriting, production, guitar, keyboards
- CJ Baran – songwriting, production, drums, programming
- Randy Merrill – mastering engineer
- Mitch McCarthy – mixing
