= Dedicated Side B =

Studio album by Carly Rae Jepsen
- Released: May 21, 2020
- Recorded: 2016–2019
- Studios: Conway Recording Studios (Los Angeles); Electric Lady Studios (New York City); The Village Studios (Los Angeles); Jack & Coke Studios (Stockholm); Dogghouse Studios (Stockholm); Westlake Recording Studios (Los Angeles); Comic Sands (Los Angeles); Patrik's House (Stockholm)
- Genre: Dance-pop
- Length: 43:24
- Labels: 604; Schoolboy; Interscope
- Producers: Jack Antonoff; CJ Baran; Patrik Berger; Tyler Andrew Duncan; James Flannigan; John Hill; Hightower; Theo Katzman; Jordan Palmer; Jack & Coke; Oak/The Orphanage; Ariel Rechtshaid; Ben Romans; Buddy Ross; Pontus Winnberg

Carly Rae Jepsen chronology
Dedicated (2019)	Dedicated Side B (2020)	The Loneliest Time (2022)

Dedicated Side B is the fifth studio album by Canadian singer Carly Rae Jepsen. It serves as a companion piece to Dedicated (2019), her fourth studio album. It was released on May 21, 2020, by 604 Records in Canada, and Schoolboy and Interscope Records in the United States. The album features 14 outtakes from the original album. The album was preceded by the release of the single "Let's Be Friends", which was ultimately included only on its Japanese edition. Musically, the album is primarily a dance-pop record with disco influences.

The album received positive reviews. It peaked at number 58 in Jepsen's home country on the Canadian Albums Chart. In the United States, it peaked at number 22 on the Billboard Top Album Sales chart. The album's highest peak position was number eight on the Scottish Albums Chart. It also peaked at number 42 on the UK Albums Chart.

== Background ==
While recording Dedicated, Jepsen confirmed that she had written "nearly 200 songs" for the album. Over the year following the release of Dedicated, speculation grew as to whether Jepsen would release a companion piece to Dedicated as she had done for her previous album with Emotion: Side B. Though Dedicated Side B was subsequently released with no prior announcement on May 21, 2020, Jepsen teased the album while speaking to Mike Wass from Idolator, stating:

I feel like I should stop pretending. I have every intention of doing that and releasing a part two, I think that's the fun with having this much time to record an album. It gives you a little bit of perspective on what should come first and what should come second. It was easier to narrow down the first part because I knew was going to get to share a lot more songs.

While discussing the influences for the tracks in an interview with Paper's Brendan Wetmore, Jepsen stated that she "wanted the beach-y vibe of Beach Boys, the stoner sort of — where you're following a guy around at the beach and like making love and doing all the things that are very holiday-ish. More allowing ourselves to get as weird as we wanted that day". In a separate question about the retro synths being used heavily in some of Jepsen's projects, she answered:

Originally with [Dedicated], I was looking to go into '70s disco, and I think we thought that was "Julien", but the rest of it kind of just led me right back to what I think is my idea of one of the greatest eras of pop music, which is the '80s. It's very heart-on-your-sleeve, and it's very to-the-point and not afraid to really be vulnerable and say the things that you really mean. I'm kind of drawn back to that place and I think the synth sound is still so very '80s, and it allows me to be like, "I'm going to tell you the deep secrets of my heart, let's go!"

== Critical reception ==
Professional ratings
Aggregate scores
Source	Rating
AnyDecentMusic?	7.6/10
Metacritic	79/100
Review scores
Source	Rating
Consequence of Sound	B−
Exclaim!	8/10
NME	4/5 stars
Our Culture Mag	3.5/5 stars
Pitchfork	6.9/10
Slant	4/5 stars
Sputnikmusic	4.5/5 stars
Tom Hull	B+

At Metacritic, which assigns a normalized rating out of 100 to reviews from mainstream critics, the album received a score of 79 out of 100 based on seven reviews, indicating "generally favorable reviews".

Ali Shutler from NME described the album as "easily one of the best pop records of the year so far", and goes on to praise specific qualities of the album: "Dedicated Side B provides a joyous burst of escapism from the miserable everyday, the lockdown yin to the yang of Charli XCX's How I'm Feeling Now. Consistently brilliant, Side B might be a collection of offcuts but this is the sort of record that most acts could only dream of making". Natalia Barr of Consequence of Sound praised "how focused Jepsen's writing process has been on every emotion and experience love brings", while noting that "Songs like the '80s bass-heavy, ABBA-inspired 'Summer Love' and soft ballad 'Heartbeat' could have been beneficial additions to Dedicated". Stereogum’s Chris DeVille wrote that "track for track [the songs are] at least as good as the original Dedicated offerings, if not better" as they "hang together much more naturally". In addition, DeVille complimented the second half of the album, in which "Jepsen plays around with rock sounds on the bass-grooving 'Summer Love' and the frantically upbeat 'Let's Sort The Whole Thing Out'", and finished off by inviting "those of us who were losing interest in the Carly Rae Jepsen show to tune back in". In an article for Exclaim, Angela Morrison called Dedicated Side B a "remarkable" album, noting that "Jepsen [has] found a formula that works well for her — sparkling synth-pop inflected by giddy romantic anticipation". Morrison went into further detail with some of the tracks on the album, noting that "the slinky, sexy 'Fake Mona Lisa' and the bubbly, shimmering 'Now I Don't Hate California After All' sound like nothing she has ever done before", and that "'Felt This Way' takes a melancholic approach", while its counterpart, "Stay Away", "is more cheeky and upbeat". In addition, Morrison wrote that the album was "brimming with starry-eyed euphoria, glittery synth-pop confections and her characteristically odd lyrical syntax", concluding that "In essence, it has everything that makes Jepsen's music lovable and bewitching".

Writing for NPR, Jon Lewis stated that "the album feels like much more than a compilation of outtakes from her last release", expanding that the project "could have easily functioned as a stand-alone record, with a fresh batch of exuberant, lovestruck choruses to get lodged in your head all summer". Lewis also called the new tracks "both a blessing and a curse", because "On the one hand, it can be frustrating to listen to her always perfect dance pop on the eve of a summer likely to be short on dance parties", but "On the other, no one makes music for dancing like nobody's watching or singing along in the shower like Carly Rae Jepsen". In an article from Sputnikmusic, SowingSeason wrote that the "twelve outstanding pop songs with nary a weak link" were "better than the album from which these songs were cast off", and "quite possibly the best Carly Rae Jespen release, period". The writer also described the tracks as "80s-washed, electronic summer pop songs that Jepsen can now craft in her sleep", and called the album "more upbeat, energetic, and memorable than its counterpart, featuring hook-laden verses and explosive choruses that only came through intermittently on [Dedicated]". The writer further stated that the "album is good enough that had Jepsen simply released it with a new title, nobody would have batted an eye – it would have just been assumed that she poured her heart and soul into these tracks and that it is the spiritual successor to Emotion", concluding that as Jepsen "surprise releases her very best album to date – as if they're songs she couldn't care less about – she proves why she's one of the best pop artists in the whole industry".

Callie Ahlgrim from Insider described the album as a "cohesive, sun-dappled, exultant artistic vision", as Jepsen "revels in her feel-good pop dominance and '80s-infused idealism". Ahlgrim commented on how Jepsen "rarely deviates from her sparkling, tingly, edge-free formula", writing that she "doesn't need to", as she "simply continues to stack impeccable, immediately likable bops on top of each other, like an everlasting Jenga tower — no biggie". Writing for Slant Magazine, Alexa Camp wrote that while the album is "less musically adventurous than those [on Dedicated]", it "[doubles] down on pillow talk, lending the album a uniformity that its predecessor lacked". Camp went into further detail about the opening track, writing that "'This Love Isn't Crazy' is as immediate as anything in Jepsen's catalog and finds producer Jack Antonoff at his most unapologetically pop", in addition to describing the album's closing track, "the island-flavored closing track 'Now I Don't Hate California After All'" as a callback to Dedicated's "Right Words, Wrong Time". Camp concluded that the songs on the album represented the "wealth of treasures she had to choose from, [and] her ability to craft a cohesive narrative", and noted that the lyrics of "the meditative 'Comeback', [demonstrate] the tangled multi-dimensionality of both her psyche and the act of sex itself".

In July 2020, the album was included on American Songwriter and Slant Magazine's lists of the best albums of 2020 so far.

== Commercial performance ==
Dedicated Side B peaked at number 58 on the Canadian Albums Chart. In the United States, it did not enter the Billboard 200, but it peaked at number 22 on the Billboard Top Album Sales chart. The album's highest peak position was number eight on the Scottish Albums chart. It also peaked at number 42 on the UK Albums Chart.

== Track listing ==
Dedicated Side B track listing
No.	Title	Writer(s)	Producer(s)	Length
1.	"This Love Isn't Crazy"	Carly Rae Jepsen; Jack Antonoff	Antonoff	3:53
2.	"Window"	Jepsen; Theo Katzman; Tyler Andrew Duncan	Katzman; Duncan	3:18
3.	"Felt This Way"	Jepsen; John Hill; Jordan Palmer; Tavish Crowe; Jakob Hazell; Svante Halldin	Hill; J. Palmer; Rob Cohen^{[a]}	3:37
4.	"Stay Away"	Jepsen; Crowe; Hazell; Halldin	Jack & Coke	3:37
5.	"This Is What They Say"	Jepsen; Devonté Hynes; Sean Douglas; Warren Oak Felder; Crowe	Oak/The Orphanage	3:34
6.	"Heartbeat"	Jepsen; Noah Beresin; Asia Whiteacre; Ariel Rechtshaid	Rechtshaid; Buddy Ross	4:13
7.	"Summer Love"	Jepsen; Hill; Daniel Ledinsky; Dave Palmer; Patrik Berger	Hill; Berger; Cohen^{[a]}	3:16
8.	"Fake Mona Lisa"	Jepsen; Julia Karlsson; Anton Rundberg; Crowe	Hightower	2:12
9.	"Let's Sort the Whole Thing Out"	Jepsen; Berger; Markus Krunegård; Pontus Winnberg	Berger; Winnberg	3:54
10.	"Comeback" (featuring Bleachers)	Jepsen; Antonoff; Jared Manierka	Antonoff	3:44
11.	"Solo"	Jepsen; Nate Campany; James Flannigan	Flannigan	3:16
12.	"Now I Don't Hate California After All"	Jepsen; Berger; Noonie Bao; Krunegård; Winnberg	Berger; Winnberg	4:53
Total length:				43:24

Japanese CD edition bonus tracks
No.	Title	Writer(s)	Producer(s)	Length
13.	"Let's Be Friends"	Jepsen; Christopher J Baran; Ben Romans	Baran; Romans	3:10
14.	"Always on My Mind"	Jepsen; Baran; Romans	Baran; Romans	3:15
Total length:				49:49

Notes:

- ^{^[a]} signifies a vocal producer.

== Personnel ==
Adapted from the album liner notes.

Performance

- Jack Antonoff – keys (tracks 1, 10), programming (tracks 1, 10), percussion (track 1), drums (tracks 1, 10), background vocals, (track 10)
- Christopher J Baran – programming (tracks 13, 14), drums (tracks 13, 14)
- Patrik Berger – drums (track 7), all instruments (track 9, 12), programming (tracks 9, 12), engineering (track 12)
- Bleachers – feature vocals (track 10)
- Tyler Andrew Duncan – keys (track 2), synths (track 2), whistling (track 2), programming (track 2), sound design (track 2)
- Warren "Oak" Felder – instrumentation (track 5), programming (track 5)
- James Flannigan – programming (track 11), background vocals (track 11)
- John Hill – guitar (track 3), programming (track 3), keys (tracks 3, 7), drums (track 7)
- Hightower – keyboards (track 8), drums (track 8), programming (track 8), instrumentation (track 8)
- Jack & Coke – keyboards (track 4), drums (track 4), percussion (track 4), guitars (track 4), bass (track 4), programming (track 4), instrumentation (track 4)
- Carly Rae Jepsen – lead vocals (all tracks), background vocals (track 11)
- Julia Karlsson – background vocals (track 8)
- Theo Katzman – background vocals (track 2), drums (track 2), guitars (track 2), electric bass (track 2), percussion (track 2)
- Marcus Krunegård – all instruments (track 9), programming (track 9)
- Dave Palmer – keys (track 7)
- Jordan Palmer – keys (track 3), programming (track 3)
- Ariel Rechtshaid – drums (track 6), programming (track 6), keys (track 6)
- Ben Romans – guitars (track 13), keys (tracks 13, 14)
- Buddy Ross – keys (track 6)
- Joey Whitley – guitar (track 6), bass (track 6)
- Pontus Winnberg – all instruments (track 9), programming (track 9)

Technical

- Jack Antonoff – production (tracks 1, 10), recording (tracks 1, 10)
- Christopher J Baran – production (tracks 13, 14), engineering (tracks 13, 14)
- Patrik Berger – production (tracks 7, 9, 12)
- Jake Birch – mixing (track 2)
- Rob Cohen – vocal production (tracks 3, 7), engineering (tracks 3, 7)
- Brian Cruz – assistant engineering (track 10)
- Tyler Andrew Duncan – production (track 2)
- Greg Eliason – assistant engineering (track 10)
- James Flannigan – production (track 11), programming (track 11), engineering (track 11)
- Gene Grimaldi – mastering (all tracks)
- John Hill – production (tracks 3, 7)
- Hightower – production (track 8)
- Jack & Coke – production (track 4)
- Chris Kasych – mixing (track 1)
- Theo Katzman – production (track 2)
- Mitch McCarthy – mixing (tracks 3–14)
- Oak – production (track 5)
- The Orphanage – production (track 5)
- Jordan Palmer – production (track 3)
- Ariel Rechtshaid – production (track 6), engineering (track 6)
- Ben Romans – production (tracks 13, 14), engineering (tracks 13, 14)
- Buddy Ross – production (track 6)
- Laura Sisk – recording (tracks 1, 10)
- John Rooney – assistant engineering (tracks 1, 10)
- Jon Sher – assistant engineering (tracks 1, 10)
- Pontus Winnberg – production (tracks 9, 12)

Other personnel

- Hayley Atkin – styling
- Tavish Crowe – musical director
- Amy Davis – creative director
- Angela Groundwater – illustration
- Dina Hovsepian – art direction, design
- Natalie O'Moore – album cover photography

== Charts ==
Chart performance for Dedicated Side B
Chart (2020)	Peak position
Canadian Albums (Billboard)	58
Japanese Albums (Oricon)	60
Scottish Albums (Official Charts)	8
UK Albums (Official Charts)	42
US Top Album Sales (Billboard)	22

== Release history ==
Release dates and formats for Dedicated Side B
Region	Date	Format	Label	Ref.
Various	May 21, 2020	Digital download; streaming	604; Schoolboy; Interscope	
Various	June 12, 2020	CD; cassette; LP	604; Schoolboy; Interscope	
Japan	June 17, 2020	CD	Universal	
