= Dedicated (Carly Rae Jepsen album) =

Studio album by Carly Rae Jepsen
- Released: May 17, 2019
- Recorded: 2016–2019
- Studios: Neon Garden (Maderas Village); Rodeo Recording (Santa Monica); The Village Studios (Los Angeles); Captain Cuts Studio (Los Angeles); Rough Customer (Brooklyn); Studio America (Los Angeles); Hope Studios (Silver Lake); 145 House (Sherman Oaks); Comic Sands (Los Angeles); Westlake Studios (Los Angeles); Patrik's House (Stockholm); Dogghouse Studios (Stockholm)
- Genres: Pop; synth-pop; electropop; dance-pop; disco
- Length: 42:23
- Labels: 604; Schoolboy; Interscope
- Producers: Jim Alxndr; Jack Antonoff; Ayokay; CJ Baran; Patrik Berger; Noah Breakfast; Captain Cuts; Rogét Chahayed; Tommy English; James Flannigan; John Hill; Alex Hope; Koz; Jordan Palmer; Kyle Shearer; Benjamin Romans; Anton "HighTower" Rundberg; Asa Taccone; Pontus Winnberg

Carly Rae Jepsen chronology
Emotion: Side B (2016)	Dedicated (2019)	Dedicated Side B (2020)

Singles from Dedicated
- 1. "Party for One" Released: November 1, 2018; 2. "Now That I Found You" Released: February 27, 2019; 3. "No Drug Like Me" Released: February 27, 2019; 4. "Julien" Released: April 19, 2019; 5. "Too Much" Released: May 9, 2019; 6. "Want You in My Room" Released: May 17, 2019

Dedicated is the fourth studio album by Canadian singer Carly Rae Jepsen. It was released on May 17, 2019, by 604 Records in Canada, and School Boy and Interscope Records in the United States. The album was preceded by the release of the singles "Party for One", "Now That I Found You", "No Drug Like Me", "Julien", "Too Much", and "Want You in My Room". To support the album Jepsen embarked on The Dedicated Tour with dates in Europe, North America and Asia. A companion album, Dedicated Side B, featuring outtakes from Dedicated, was released just over a year later on May 21, 2020.

The album received positive reviews and debuted at number 18 in the US, becoming her third top-twenty album. The album also peaked inside the top 20 in Jepsen's home country, at number 16 on the Canadian Albums Chart and at number 17 on the Scottish Albums Chart. Dedicated was named in many year-end lists of best albums of 2019.

== Background ==
In April 2016, Jepsen spoke to Stereogum that she was eager to work on new music, hoping to halve the production time consumed by her previous record. She had a stroke of inspiration that was not apparent when development on her third studio album Emotion (2015) began, which ultimately took three years to produce as Jepsen sought creative control and an evolution in sound. She aimed to release new music by the next year.

Work on her fourth studio album commenced in June 2016, where she traveled to Sweden on the first of four trips. Frameworking the project was the notion of how music is consumed in her own life, "which is sometimes a little more homestyle, dance parties in the living room with your friends." Her relationship with photographer David Larkins came to an end during the same trip, which prompted Jepsen to explore the melancholy that pervaded her life:

I think the album goes through that process of like, "Shit, what do I do now?" And, at the same time, singlehood for the first time in a while, which I'm kind of new at! So there was an arc of like, full-on heartbreak to a new story. I think I do pull a lot of inspiration from the complexities of relationships in all of its phases. It was a real painful thing in my life, but a real helpful thing for being inspired.

Jepsen described producer John Hill, whom she met further along in the process, as being a "hero on this project, in terms of his production seeming really fresh to me and kind of dark in their tastes, and so it was fun to have these falsetto, almost more soft toplines on top of the dark production." Other contributors to the album include Jack Antonoff, Noonie Bao, Pontus Winnberg of Bloodshy & Avant and Captain Cuts. Early in development, Jepsen was particularly looking forward to meeting Patrik Berger, being a fan of his work on Swedish singer Robyn's 2010 single "Dancing On My Own".

== Writing and development ==
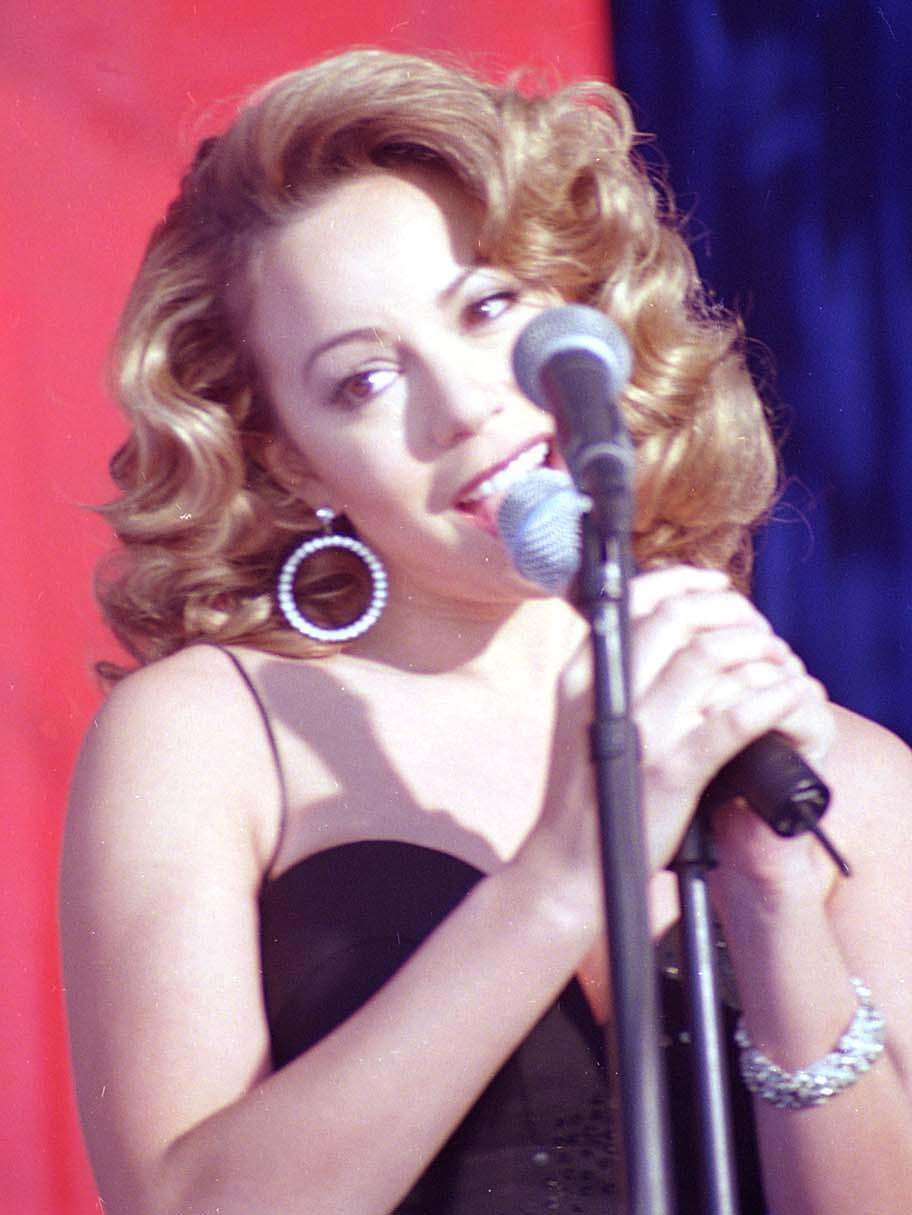
Mariah Carey (pictured) was cited as a major influence on the creation of "Automatically In Love".

Under the working title of Music to Clean Your House To, Jepsen conceived the album as "an understated disco, living room dance party thing", an inclination that arose from digging into ABBA's back catalogue. These influences from the '70s era, namely Donna Summer and the Bee Gees, were channeled into an incarnation of the project titled Disco Sweat. It was shelved as Berger advised her against working too rigidly, Jepsen expressing, "You might be shooting yourself in the foot and limiting where you can go." She further explained:

When I showed up with that mission statement that was so pigeonholed, it really wasn't helping the writing process. It was fun to get a few songs that landed naturally in that zone — I think "Julien" was the most understated disco song that made the album — but I think it was Patrik [Berger] who said, "It'll be much more fun if you just allow yourself to play in all directions." I knew at that time that I was gonna take a beat with this thing, so it felt like the right move to just experiment.

By May 2019, Jepsen had written "nearly 200 songs" for the album.

== Music and lyrics ==
Dedicated is a "collection of forward-thinking" pop, electropop, synth-pop, disco and dance-pop songs inspired by music from the 1980s and 1990s with elements of house and R&B. Its lyrics span themes of "crushing hard, having anxiety about a new relationship, experiencing true lovesickness, breaking up, and finally coming to terms with being alone".

== Promotion ==
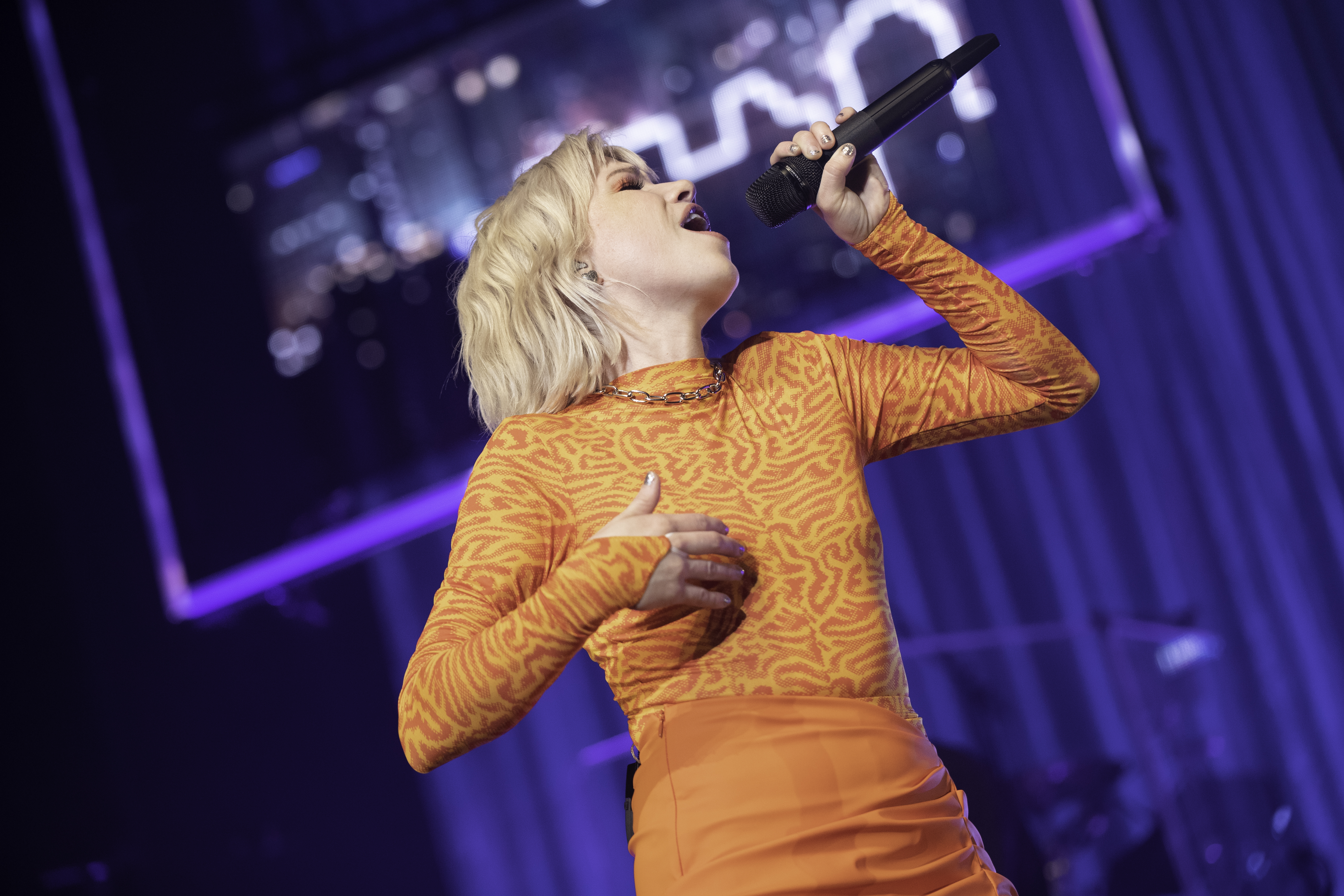
Jepsen during her The Dedicated Tour.

"Party for One" was released as the lead single on November 1, 2018. On February 27, 2019, "Now That I Found You" and "No Drug Like Me" were issued as a double A-side single. "Now That I Found You" was written at a writing camp in Nicaragua. A music video for "Now That I Found You" was released on March 14, 2019. On March 31, 2019, Jepsen teased an upcoming announcement on her social media accounts. On April 1, 2019, the title and release date for Dedicated were announced, along with US dates for The Dedicated Tour. On April 17, 2019, Jepsen revealed the album's track listing and cover. The album was made available to pre-order on April 19, 2019, along with the fourth single "Julien". "Julien" was written at Maderas Village, Nicaragua in August 2016.

"Too Much" was released as the album's fifth single on May 9, 2019. Its music video was released on May 17, 2019. On June 28, Jepsen released a Mansionair remix of "No Drug Like Me" as a promotional single to mark the launch of the North American leg of The Dedicated Tour. On September 19, 2019, a video for the album's sixth single, "Want You in My Room", was uploaded to Jepsen's YouTube channel. A live version of the song recorded at Electric Lady Studios in New York City was released as a single on October 2, 2019, exclusively on Spotify alongside a cover of No Doubt's "Don't Speak" as a B-side. On October 18, 2019, a live video for the album's ninth track, "The Sound", was uploaded to YouTube. Jepsen and the band performed on a dock in a lake in Finland. MTV called the performance "adorably autumnal and simply sublime". The recording was also released on digital retailers as a promotional single.

== Critical reception ==
Professional ratings
Aggregate scores
Source	Rating
AnyDecentMusic?	7.4/10
Metacritic	79/100
Review scores
Source	Rating
AllMusic	4.5/5 stars
Consequence of Sound	B
Exclaim!	8/10
The Guardian	4/5 stars
The Independent	4/5 stars
The Irish Times	4/5 stars
NME	4/5 stars
Pitchfork	7.3/10
Rolling Stone	3.5/5 stars
The Times	2/5 stars

Dedicated received generally positive reviews from music critics; aggregating website Metacritic reports a normalized rating of 79, based on 22 critical reviews, indicating "generally favorable reviews".

Reviewing the album for AllMusic, Heather Phares gave a rating of four and a half stars out of five, writing that "Jepsen is just as committed to her music as she is to the ideal of true love, and the way she's grown without sacrificing her uniqueness makes Dedicated a master class in what a 2010s pop album can be." Laura Snapes of The Guardian gave a rating of four stars out of five, stating that "[Jepsen] belts less, but leaves a stronger impression: swooning into the gently funky 'Julien'; seductively in control on the looser 'No Drug Like Me'; cheeky as Cyndi Lauper on 'Want You in My Room'." Giving a rating of four stars out of five, Elisa Bray of The Independent describes Dedicated as "an album of polished pop" that "perhaps... will put [Jepsen] at the top where she belongs."

=== Year-end lists ===
Dedicated on year-end lists
Publication	Accolade	Rank	Ref.
Albumism	50 Best Albums of 2019	10	
The Atlantic	The 18 Best Albums of 2019	—	
Billboard	The 50 Best Albums of 2019	20	
CBC Music	Top 19 Canadian Albums of 2019	2	
Exclaim!	20 Best Pop and Rock Albums of 2019	19	
Flood Magazine	The 25 Best Albums of 2019	20	
GQ	The Best Albums of 2019	—	
NPR	The 20 Top Albums of 2019	19	
Paste	The 50 Best Albums of 2019	7	
The Skinny	Top 20 Albums of 2019 So Far	10	
Slant Magazine	The 25 Best of Albums of 2019	5	
Variety	The Best Albums of 2019	10	
Uproxx	The Best Albums of 2019	8	

== Commercial performance ==
Dedicated debuted at number 16 in Canada. In the United States, the album debuted at number 18 on the US Billboard 200, selling 21,000 album-equivalent units, of which 13,000 were pure sales. In the UK and Japan, it debuted at number 26 and number 28, respectively

== Track listing ==
Dedicated track listing
No.	Title	Writer(s)	Producer(s)	Length
1.	"Julien"	Carly Rae Jepsen; Kyle Shearer; Nate Cyphert; Benjamin Ruttner; Jared Manierka	Shearer	3:54
2.	"No Drug Like Me"	Jepsen; John Hill; Jordan Palmer; Daniel Ledinsky; James Flannigan	Hill; Palmer	3:28
3.	"Now That I Found You"	Jepsen; Ben Berger; Ryan McMahon; Ryan Rabin; Alexander O'Neill	Captain Cuts; Ayokay^{[a]}	3:20
4.	"Want You in My Room"	Jepsen; Jack Antonoff; Tavish Crowe	Antonoff	2:46
5.	"Everything He Needs"	Jepsen; Harry Nilsson; Christopher Baran; Ben Romans; Amanda Warner	Baran; Romans	3:38
6.	"Happy Not Knowing"	Jepsen; Hill; Palmer; Crowe; Ledinsky	Hill; Palmer^{[c]}	2:41
7.	"I'll Be Your Girl"	Jepsen; Hill; Patrik Berger	Hill; Berger	2:58
8.	"Too Much"	Jepsen; Hill; Palmer; Noonie Bao	Hill; Palmer^{[b]}; Rob Cohen^{[d]}	3:17
9.	"The Sound"	Jepsen; Tommy English; Noah Beresin; Manierka	English Breakfast	2:51
10.	"Automatically in Love"	Jepsen; Hill; Rogét Chahayed; Nate Campany	Hill; Chahayed; Cohen^{[d]}	3:33
11.	"Feels Right" (featuring Electric Guest)	Jepsen; Hill; Palmer; Asa Taccone; Matthew Compton	Hill; Taccone; Palmer^{[c]}	2:43
12.	"Right Words Wrong Time"	Jepsen; Alex Hope; Chahayed	Hope^{[c]}; Chahayed	3:20
13.	"Real Love"	Jepsen; Flannigan; Chris Whitehall	Flannigan^{[c]}; Koz^{[a]}; Jim Alxndr^{[a]}; Daniel Zaidenstadt^{[d]}	3:54
Total length:				42:23

US Target, international physical deluxe and worldwide digital edition bonus tracks
No.	Title	Writer(s)	Producer(s)	Length
14.	"For Sure"	Jepsen; Berger; Bao; Pontus Winnberg	Berger; Winnberg	3:04
15.	"Party for One"	Jepsen; Anton Rundberg; Julia Karlsson; Crowe	Captain Cuts; Hightower; Karlsson^{[d]}	3:03
Total length:				48:30

Japanese CD edition bonus tracks
No.	Title	Length
16.	"Now That I Found You" (Until Dawn remix)	5:23
17.	"Party for One" (More Giraffes remix)	2:46
Total length:		56:39

- "Everything He Needs" contains portions of "He Needs Me" by Harry Nilsson
- ^{^[a]} signifies an additional producer
- ^{^[b]} signifies a co-producer
- ^{^[c]} signifies a producer and vocal producer
- ^{^[d]} signifies a vocal producer

== Personnel ==
Credits taken from the album's liner notes.

Performance

- Carly Rae Jepsen – lead vocals (all tracks), background vocals (track 15)
- Kyle Shearer – instruments (track 1)
- Nate Cyphert – background vocals (track 1)
- John Hill – guitar (track 2, 6–8, 11), keyboards (track 2, 6, 8, 10–11), synth (track 6–8), drums (track 6–8), percussion (track 6, 8), bass (track 6, 8, 11), programming (track 6–8, 10), horns (track 11)
- Jordan Palmer – guitar (track 2, 6, 8), keyboards (track 2, 6, 8, 11), bass (track 2, 6, 8), drums (track 2, 6, 8, 11), synthesizer (track 2, 6, 8), percussion (track 6, 8), programming (track 6, 8, 11)
- Captain Cuts – background vocals (track 3), keyboards, drums, programming, instrumentation (track 15)
- Jack Antonoff – instruments, programming (track 4)
- Ben Romans – keys (track 5)
- Amanda Warner – bass (track 5)
- CJ Baran – programming (track 5)
- Patrik Berger – bass, guitar, drums (track 7), instruments, programming (track 14)
- James King – saxophone (track 7)
- Noah Beresin – piano (track 9)
- Rogét Chahayed – bass (track 10), keyboards (track 10, 12), programming (track 12)
- Electric Guest – featured vocals, piano, keyboards, percussion, guitar (track 11)
- Alex Hope – programming, keyboards (track 12)
- James Flannigan – programming (track 13)
- Koz Alxndr – additional programming (track 13)
- Jim Alxndr – additional programming, saxophone (track 13)
- Noonie Bao – background vocals (track 14)
- Pontus Winnberg – instruments, programming (track 14)
- Julia Karlsson – background vocals (track 15)
- Hightower – keyboards, drums, programming, instrumentation (track 15)

Technical

- Serban Ghenea – mixing (tracks 1–4, 14–15)
- John Hanes – engineering (tracks 1–4, 14–15)
- Gene Grimaldi – mastering (tracks 1, 4–6, 8–9, 11–14)
- Rob Cohen – engineering (tracks 2, 6–8, 10)
- Chris Gehringer – mastering (tracks 2, 7, 10)
- Captain Cuts – engineering (track 3), arrangement (track 15)
- Dave Kutch – mastering (track 3)
- Laura Sisk – engineering (track 4)
- Mitch McCarthy – mixing (tracks 5, 11)
- CJ Baran – engineering (track 5)
- Jon Castelli – mixing (tracks 6–8, 10)
- Ingmar Carlson – engineering for mix (tracks 6–8, 10)
- Blake Mares – engineering (tracks 6–8, 10–11)
- Tony Maserati – mixing (track 9)
- Miles Comaskey – assistant mix engineering (track 9)
- Josh Gudwin – mixing (track 12)
- Elijah Merritt-Hitch – assistant mixing (track 12)
- Hightower – arrangement (track 15)

== Charts ==
Chart performance for Dedicated
Chart (2019)	Peak position
Australian Albums (ARIA)	33
Canadian Albums (Billboard)	16
France Download Albums (SNEP)	31
Irish Albums (IRMA)	39
Japan Hot Albums (Billboard Japan)	34
Japanese Albums (Oricon)	32
New Zealand Albums (RMNZ)	40
Scottish Albums (Official Charts)	17
Swiss Albums (Schweizer Hitparade)	71
UK Albums (Official Charts)	26
US Billboard 200	18
US Indie Store Album Sales (Billboard)	7

== Release history ==
List of regions, release dates, showing formats, label, editions and references
Region	Date	Formats	Editions	Label	Ref.
Various	May 17, 2019	CD; digital download; streaming	Standard; deluxe	604; School Boy; Interscope	
Various	June 12, 2019	LP	Standard	604; School Boy; Interscope	
