= It's Not Christmas Till Somebody Cries =

Single by Carly Rae Jepsen
- Released: October 30, 2020
- Genre: Synth-pop
- Length: 2:52
- Label: 604; School Boy; Interscope
- Songwriter(s): Benjamin Romans; CJ Baran; Carly Rae Jepsen; James Flannigan
- Producer(s): Benjamin Romans; CJ Baran

Carly Rae Jepsen singles chronology
"OK on Your Own" (2020)	"It's Not Christmas Till Somebody Cries" (2020)	"Western Wind" (2022)

Music video
- "It's Not Christmas Till Somebody Cries" on YouTube

"It's Not Christmas Till Somebody Cries" is a Christmas song by Canadian singer Carly Rae Jepsen, released on October 30, 2020. The song is about "expectation versus reality" when it comes to holiday celebrations and "the antics of a dyfunctional family holiday gathering".

== Personnel ==
Credits adapted from Tidal.

- Carly Rae Jepsen – songwriting, lead vocals
- Benjamin Romans – songwriting, production, background vocals, programming, synthesizer
- CJ Baran – songwriting, production, background vocals, programming
- James Flannigan – songwriting
- Gene Grimaldi – mastering engineer
- Mitch McCarthy – mixing

== Charts ==
Chart performance for "It's Not Christmas Till Somebody Cries"
Chart (2020)	Peak position
US Holiday Digital Song Sales (Billboard)	11
