= Julien (song) =

2019 song by Carly Rae Jepsen

Single by Carly Rae Jepsen

from the album Dedicated
- Released: April 19, 2019
- Genre: Funk-pop; synth-pop; disco; electropop; dance
- Length: 3:54
- Label: 604; School Boy; Interscope
- Songwriters: Carly Rae Jepsen; Benjamin Ruttner; Jared Manierka; Kyle Shearer; Nate Cyphert
- Producer: Kyle Shearer

Carly Rae Jepsen singles chronology
"No Drug Like Me" (2019)	"Julien" (2019)	"Too Much" (2019)

Audio video
- "Julien" on YouTube

"Julien" is a song by Canadian singer Carly Rae Jepsen from her fourth album, Dedicated. It was released on April 19, 2019, by 604, School Boy and Interscope Records as the fourth single off of the record. It is a midtempo funk-pop, synth-pop, disco, electropop and dance song influenced by soft rock.

== Background and release ==
"Julien" was written at Maderas Village, Nicaragua in August 2016. Jepsen revealed that the title was inspired by an ex-boyfriend with whom she had a "romantic weekend" in Quebec City, saying that she found the name "musical" and has been trying to write it into a song since they met, going through multiple different songs of the same name. She stated, however, that the song itself is not about a specific person, but is a metaphor of "what it is to have that person that is maybe the one that got away". The singer described "Julien" as "the heart" of Dedicated and stated that it is about an "everlasting fantastical love" that follows you for the rest of your life.

Jepsen posted a line from the song and announced its release date on social media on April 16, 2019. It was released as an instant download alongside the pre-order for Dedicated on April 19, 2019 as the fourth single off of the album. The song was performed live throughout The Dedicated Tour.

== Composition and lyrics ==
"Julien" is a "squelchy" and "shimmery" midtempo funk-pop, synth-pop, disco, electropop and dance song composed in the key of A minor. It has a tempo of 119 beats per minute and influences of soft rock. Its instrumentation consists of a "clean, robotic" and "driving" beat, "soft" and "swelling" guitars, as well as "slippery" synths. Lyrically, the track is a "simmering reflection on fleeting romance", which portrays Jepsen as a "wounded animal, searching for a way to cauterize her injuries as she lies on the road to heartbreak". Jepsen "sings about somebody she wishes she was with" and "tells the story of a long lost love that she prays will come back but knowing deep down that he probably won't" on the song.

== Critical reception ==
Mark Young of Mxdwn called the song the "centerpiece of the album", and complimented the synthesizers used in the beginning of the song. Young also praised the buildup verse to pre-chorus to hook, writing that it is "perfectly executed". Writing for Pitchfork, Anna Gaca noted the "windshield-wiper synths that open Julien", "pointing to Jepsen's other guiding aesthetic: chill disco". Music critics Heather Phares of AllMusic and Anthony Fantano highlighted "Julien" as one of the best songs on Dedicated. It was selected as one of the best tracks of 2019 by The Guardian journalist Graeme Virtue and voted one of the top songs of 2019 by Pitchfork readers.

=== Year-end lists ===
Publication	Year	Accolade	Rank	Ref.
Elle	2019	60 Best Songs of 2019	39	

== Charts ==
Chart (2019)	Peak position
China Airplay/FL (Billboard)	26

== Release history ==
Release dates and formats for "Julien"
Region	Date	Format	Label	Ref.
Russia	May 14, 2019	Contemporary hit radio	Universal	
