= The Dedicated Tour =

2019–20 concert tour by Carly Rae Jepsen

- Tour by Carly Rae Jepsen
- Promotional poster for the tour
- Location: Asia; Europe; North America; Oceania
- Associated album: Dedicated
- Start date: 23 May 2019
- End date: 21 February 2020
- Legs: 5
- No. of shows: 77

Carly Rae Jepsen concert chronology
- Gimmie Love Tour (2015–16); The Dedicated Tour (2019–20); The So Nice Tour (2022–23)

The Dedicated Tour was the third concert tour by Canadian singer Carly Rae Jepsen. Launched in support of her fourth studio album, Dedicated (2019), the tour began on 23 May 2019 in Stockholm and traveled across North America, Europe, Asia, and Oceania.

== Development ==
Jepsen first announced on 1 April 2019, that her upcoming album Dedicated would be released on 17 May 2019, and that she would embark on The Dedicated Tour in support of it. Copies of the album were included along with the purchased tickets. During the North American leg of the tour, one dollar from each ticket purchased went to the Crisis Text Line and The Trevor Project in San Francisco. Extra dates in New York and Los Angeles were added on 2 April 2019. Canada dates were added on 23 May 2019, Asia dates were added on 7 July 2019, Oceania dates were added on 22 September 2019 and Europe dates were added on 3 December 2019.

== Set list ==
The following set list is representative of the concert performed on 27 June 2019. It is not representative of all concerts for the duration of the tour.

1. "No Drug Like Me"
2. "Emotion"
3. "Run Away with Me"
4. "Julien"
5. "Happy Not Knowing"
6. "Call Me Maybe"
7. "Now That I Found You"
8. "Gimmie Love"
9. "Feels Right"
10. "I'll Be Your Girl"
11. "For Sure"
12. "Want You In My Room"
13. "Store"
14. "Too Much"
15. "When I Needed You"
16. "I Really Like You"
17. "Everything He Needs"
18. "Boy Problems"
19. "Party for One"
  Encore
20. "All That"
21. "Let's Get Lost"
22. "Cut to the Feeling"

Notes

- "Fever" was added to the set list replacing "I'll Be Your Girl" on July 6.
- "Real Love" was added to the set list replacing "All That" on July 10.
- "Feels Right" was performed with Asa Taccone of Electric Guest on August 10–11.

== Tour dates ==
List of concerts in Europe
Date	City	Country	Venue	Opening act(s)
23 May 2019 (Note: The concert on 23 May 2019 in Stockholm was part of the Gröna Lund festival.)	Stockholm	Sweden	Gröna Lund	—N/a
25 May 2019 (Note: The concert on 25 May 2019 in Hanover was part of the N-JOY Starshow festival.)	Hanover	Germany	N-JOY Starshow	—N/a
27 May 2019	Paris	France	Gaité Lyrique	Daya
29 May 2019	London	England	XOYO	Daya
31 May 2019 (Note: The concert on 31 May 2019 in Barcelona was part of the Primavera Sound Barcelona festival.)	Barcelona	Spain	Primavera Sound Barcelona	—N/a
2 June 2019 (Note: The concert on 2 June 2019 in Hilvarenbeek was part of the Best Kept Secret Festival.)	Hilvarenbeek	Netherlands	Best Kept Secret Festival	—N/a

List of concerts in North America
Date	City	Country	Venue	Opening act(s)
27 June 2019	Anaheim	United States	House of Blues	Mansionair
28 June 2019	San Francisco	United States	Bill Graham Civic Auditorium	Mansionair
29 June 2019	Reno	United States	Grand Sierra Theatre	Mansionair
1 July 2019	Salt Lake City	United States	The Depot	Mansionair
3 July 2019	Denver	United States	Ogden Theatre	Mansionair
5 July 2019	Minneapolis	United States	State Theatre	Mansionair
6 July 2019	St. Louis	United States	The Pageant	Mansionair
7 July 2019	Nashville	United States	Ryman Auditorium	Mansionair
9 July 2019	Chicago	United States	Chicago Theatre	Mansionair
10 July 2019	Indianapolis	United States	Egyptian Room	Mansionair
12 July 2019	Cincinnati	United States	Bogart's	Mansionair
13 July 2019	Detroit	United States	The Fillmore	Mansionair
14 July 2019	Cleveland	United States	House of Blues	Mansionair
16 July 2019	Boston	United States	House of Blues	Mansionair
17 July 2019	New York City	United States	Hammerstein Ballroom	Mansionair
18 July 2019	New York City	United States	Hammerstein Ballroom	Mansionair
20 July 2019	Philadelphia	United States	The Fillmore	Phoebe Ryan
21 July 2019	Silver Spring	United States	The Fillmore	Phoebe Ryan
23 July 2019	Raleigh	United States	The Ritz	Phoebe Ryan
24 July 2019	Charlotte	United States	The Fillmore	Phoebe Ryan
26 July 2019	Miami	United States	Jackie Gleason Theater	Phoebe Ryan
27 July 2019	Orlando	United States	House of Blues	Phoebe Ryan
28 July 2019	Atlanta	United States	The Tabernacle	Phoebe Ryan
30 July 2019	New Orleans	United States	The Fillmore	Phoebe Ryan
1 August 2019	Dallas	United States	House of Blues	Phoebe Ryan
2 August 2019	Houston	United States	House of Blues	Phoebe Ryan
3 August 2019	Austin	United States	ACL Live at the Moody Theater	Phoebe Ryan
4 August 2019	San Antonio	United States	Aztec Theatre	Phoebe Ryan
6 August 2019	Phoenix	United States	The Van Buren	Phoebe Ryan
8 August 2019	San Diego	United States	Humphreys Concerts by the Bay	Phoebe Ryan
10 August 2019	Los Angeles	United States	The Wiltern	Phoebe Ryan
11 August 2019	Los Angeles	United States	The Wiltern	Phoebe Ryan
28 August 2019	Vancouver	Canada	Commodore Ballroom	Ralph
29 August 2019	Vancouver	Canada	Commodore Ballroom	Ralph
31 August 2019 (Note: The concert on 31 August 2019 was part of Bumbershoot 2019.)	Seattle	United States	Memorial Stadium	—N/a
1 September 2019	Victoria	Canada	Royal Theatre	Ralph
4 September 2019	Calgary	Canada	MacEwan Hall	Ralph
5 September 2019	Edmonton	Canada	Winspear Centre	Ralph
9 September 2019	Winnipeg	Canada	Burton Cummings Theatre	Ralph
10 September 2019	Thunder Bay	Canada	Thunder Bay Community Auditorium	Ralph
12 September 2019	Montreal	Canada	MTELUS	Ralph
13 September 2019	Hamilton	Canada	FirstOntario Concert Hall	Ralph
14 September 2019	Toronto	Canada	Sony Centre for the Performing Arts	Ralph
16 September 2019	Ottawa	Canada	Bronson Centre	Ralph
18 September 2019	Kitchener	Canada	Raffi Armenian Theatre	Ralph
19 September 2019	London	Canada	London Music Hall	Ralph
22 September 2019 (Note: This concert on 22 September 2019 was part of the Life Is Beautiful Music & Art Festival.)	Las Vegas	United States	Downtown Las Vegas	—N/a
28 September 2019	West Springfield	United States	Big E Arena	—N/a

List of concerts in Asia
Date	City	Country	Venue	Opening act(s)
5 October 2019 (Note: This concert on 5 October 2019 was part of Slow Life Slow Live 2019.)	Seoul	South Korea	Olympic Park	—N/a
7 October 2019	Tokyo	Japan	NHK Hall	—N/a
9 October 2019	Nagoya	Japan	Zepp Nagoya	—N/a
10 October 2019	Fukuoka	Japan	Zepp Fukuoka	—N/a
11 October 2019	Osaka	Japan	Zepp Namba	—N/a
13 October 2019	Sendai	Japan	Sendai GIGS	—N/a
16 October 2019	Beijing	China	Century Theatre	—N/a
18 October 2019	Chengdu	China	Huaxi Live·528 M Space	—N/a
20 October 2019	Shanghai	China	Bandai Namco Shanghai Base Dream Hall	—N/a
21 October 2019	Shanghai	China	Bandai Namco Shanghai Base Dream Hall	—N/a
23 October 2019	Quezon City	Philippines	New Frontier Theater	—N/a

List of concerts in Oceania
Date	City	Country	Venue	Opening act(s)
26 November 2019	Sydney	Australia	Enmore Theatre	Starley
2 December 2019	Melbourne	Australia	Forum Theatre	Starley
4 December 2019	Auckland	New Zealand	Auckland Town Hall	Starley

List of concerts in Europe
Date	City	Country	Venue	Opening act(s)
7 February 2020	Manchester	England	O_{2} Victoria Warehouse	Georgia
8 February 2020	London	England	O_{2} Brixton Academy	Georgia
10 February 2020	Paris	France	Trabendo	—N/a
12 February 2020	Amsterdam	Netherlands	Paradiso	—N/a
13 February 2020	Brussels	Belgium	La Madeline	Blanche
15 February 2020	Cologne	Germany	Essigfabrik	Hannah Diamond
18 February 2020	Munich	Germany	Technikum München	Hannah Diamond
19 February 2020	Berlin	Germany	Columbia Theater	Hannah Diamond
21 February 2020	Oslo	Norway	Sentrum Scene	—N/a

=== Cancelled shows ===
List of cancelled concerts, showing date, city, country, venue and reason
Date	City	Country	Venue	Reason
25 October 2019	Hong Kong		Rotunda 2, KITEC	Unforeseen circumstances
1 December 2019 (Note: The concert on 1 December 2019 in Gold Coast, Queensland was part of the SandTunes Music festival.)	Gold Coast	Australia	Metricon Stadium	Festival cancelled due to low ticket sales
16 February 2020	Hamburg	Germany	Gruenspan	Voice loss
11 April 2020 (Note: The concerts on 11 April 2020 and 18 April 2020 are part of the Coachella Valley Music and Arts Festival.)	Indio	United States	Empire Polo Club	COVID-19 pandemic
12 April 2020	Oakland	United States	Fox Oakland Theatre	COVID-19 pandemic
14 April 2020	Seattle	United States	Moore Theatre	COVID-19 pandemic
15 April 2020	Seattle	United States	Moore Theatre	COVID-19 pandemic
16 April 2020	Portland	United States	Roseland Theater	COVID-19 pandemic
18 April 2020	Indio	United States	Empire Polo Club	COVID-19 pandemic
6 June 2020 (Note: The concert on 6 June 2020 was part of the Governors Ball Music Festival.)	New York City	United States	Randalls Island	COVID-19 pandemic
22 May 2020 (Note: The concert on 22 May 2020 was part of the Tecate Emblema festival.)	Mexico City	Mexico	Autódromo Hermanos Rodríguez	COVID-19 pandemic
19 July 2020 (Note: The concert on 19 July 2020 was part of the Forecastle Festival.)	Louisville	United States	Louisville Waterfront Park	COVID-19 pandemic

== Broadcasts and recordings ==
Jepsen's performance on August 11, 2019, was streaming live on Live Nation's Twitter page as part of "Live Nation Concert Series".
