= OMG (Gryffin and Carly Rae Jepsen song) =

Single by Gryffin and Carly Rae Jepsen

from the album Gravity
- Released: July 31, 2019
- Length: 3:35
- Label: Darkroom
- Songwriter(s): Daniel Griffith; Carly Rae Jepsen; Alexandra Tamposi; Liza Owen; John Ryan II; Andrew Hass; Ian Franzino
- Producer(s): Gryffin; Afterhrs (co.)

Gryffin singles chronology
"Hurt People" (2019)	"OMG" (2019)	"Baggage" (2019)

Carly Rae Jepsen singles chronology
"Want You in My Room" (2019)	"OMG" (2019)	"Lalala" (Remix) (2019)

Music video
- "OMG" on YouTube

"OMG" is a song by American DJ Gryffin and Canadian singer Carly Rae Jepsen, released on July 31, 2019. A lyric video for the song was released the same day. The song reached number one on the US Billboard Dance Club Songs chart in the issue dated November 23, 2019, a first for both artists.

== Promotion ==
Gryffin announced the collaboration and shared the cover art on July 25, captioning the post "Big one coming next week". The music video was released on October 10, 2019.

== Track listing ==
Digital download

1. "OMG" - 3:35

OMG (Remixes Pt 1)

1. "OMG" (Moti Remix) - 2:55
2. "OMG" (Anki Remix) - 3:19
3. "OMG" (Seycara Orchestral Edition) - 3:03
4. "OMG" (Josh Le Tissier Remix) - 4:00
5. "OMG" (Alphalove Remix) - 3:17

== Charts ==
=== Weekly charts ===
Chart (2019)	Peak position
New Zealand Hot Singles (RMNZ)	19
US Dance Club Songs (Billboard)	1
US Hot Dance/Electronic Songs (Billboard)	16

=== Year-end charts ===
Chart (2019)	Position
US Hot Dance/Electronic Songs (Billboard)	77

== See also ==
- List of Billboard number-one dance songs of 2019
