= No Drug Like Me =

2019 song by Carly Rae Jepsen

- Mansionair remix cover

Single by Carly Rae Jepsen

from the album Dedicated
- Released: February 27, 2019
- Genre: Synth-pop
- Length: 3:28
- Label: 604; School Boy; Interscope
- Songwriter(s): Carly Rae Jepsen; John Hill; Jordan Palmer; Daniel Ledinsky; James Flannigan
- Producer(s): John Hill; Jordan Palmer

Carly Rae Jepsen singles chronology
"Now That I Found You" (2019)	"No Drug Like Me" (2019)	"Julien" (2019)

Audio video
- "No Drug Like Me" on YouTube

"No Drug Like Me" is a song by Canadian singer Carly Rae Jepsen. It was first released as a double A-side single with "Now That I Found You" on February 27, 2019, by 604, School Boy, and Interscope Records, to promote Jepsen's then-forthcoming fourth studio album, Dedicated. In June 2019, a remix of the song by Mansionair received an individual release as a promotional single. "No Drug Like Me" was inspired by a new love that Jepsen was experiencing at the time.

== Background ==
"No Drug Like Me" is a 1980s-influenced synth-pop ballad. It has been described as "nocturnal", "low-key", "darker and more viscous" than the rest of Jepsen's repertoire. It was written in the late evening of a recording session and according to Jepsen, it "came up very easily". Lyrically, the song was inspired by Jepsen's love for James Flannigan, who she co-wrote the song with, alongside John Hill, Jordan Palmer, and Daniel Ledinsky. It was produced by Hill and Palmer. The song is about making a commitment at the beginning of a relationship and the promise to open up if the partner turns out the right one. The lyrics equate being in love with Jepsen to drug intoxication. The singer explained that the song "is a promise I made to love in general. That when the good stuff lands my way I'll always try to be vulnerable and brave and show all of myself".

"No Drug Like Me" was released alongside "Now That I Found You" as a double A-side on February 27, 2019. Jepsen decided to release the two very different songs at the same time to demonstrate a spectrum of her new album, Dedicated. On June 28, Jepsen released a Mansionair remix of "No Drug Like Me" to coincide with the launch of the North American leg of The Dedicated Tour.

== Critical reception ==
Music critic Heather Phares of AllMusic highlighted "No Drug Like Me" as one of the best songs on Dedicated.

=== Year-end lists ===
Publication	Year	Accolade	Rank	Ref.
Stereogum	2019	100 Favorite Songs of 2019	—	

== Track listing ==
- Digital download/Streaming
1. "No Drug Like Me" (Mansionair Remix) – 3:38
