= Now That I Found You (Carly Rae Jepsen song) =

Single by Carly Rae Jepsen

from the album Dedicated
- A-side: "No Drug Like Me"
- Released: February 27, 2019
- Genre: Pop; synth-pop
- Length: 3:20
- Label: 604; School Boy; Interscope
- Songwriters: Carly Rae Jepsen; Ben Berger; Ryan McMahon; Ryan Rabin; Alexander O'Neill
- Producers: Captain Cuts; Ayokay

Carly Rae Jepsen singles chronology
"Party for One" (2018)	"Now That I Found You" (2019)	"No Drug Like Me" (2019)

Music video
- "Now That I Found You" on YouTube

"Now That I Found You" is a song by Canadian singer Carly Rae Jepsen. It was released as a double A-side single with "No Drug Like Me" on February 27, 2019 by 604, School Boy and Interscope Records, as the second advance single from Jepsen's fourth studio album, Dedicated. "Now That I Found You" was written by Jepsen, Ben Berger, Ryan McMahon, Ryan Rabin and Alexander O'Neill, while production was handled by Captain Cuts and Ayokay. According to Jepsen, "Now That I Found You" and "No Drug Like Me" are about "the giddy sugar rush of opening up to new love" and they "go thematically hand-in-hand".

== Background ==
"Now That I Found You" was written at a songwriting camp in Nicaragua with Benjamin Berger, Ryan McMahon and Ryan Rabin of production team Captain Cuts and Alexander O'Neill, known professionally as Ayokay, in August 2017. It is a pop and synth-pop song with a "synth-heavy, '80s-inspired sound". Jepsen revealed that she wasn't in love when she wrote the song, and was just imagining how good she wanted to feel. She stated that the track "is about the high you get when a new love starts to change your life".

On February 13, 2019, "Now That I Found You" was featured in the teaser trailer for the third season of Queer Eye and the song was made available to pre-save on streaming services. On February 20, 2019, Jepsen revealed the single's cover and release date. On February 21 and 22, 2019, Jepsen released teaser videos with snippets of "Now That I Found You". On February 25, 2019, Jepsen announced that "No Drug Like Me" would be released alongside "Now That I Found You". A teaser video with a snippet of the song was released the following day. On February 27, 2019, "Now That I Found You" made its world premiere on Apple Music's Beats 1 radio as Zane Lowe's World Record.

== Critical reception ==
Upon its release, "Now That I Found You" was named the Song of the Week by Consequence of Sound. Music critic Anthony Fantano highlighted it as one of the best songs on Dedicated. The Guardian journalist Betty Clarke selected "Now That I Found You" as one of the best tracks of 2019. In October 2022, Rachel Seo of Variety ranked it as Jepsen's eighth best song.

=== Year-end lists ===
Publication	Year	Accolade	Rank	Ref.
Billboard	2019	100 Best Songs of 2019	43	
Stereogum	2019	Top 40 Pop Songs of 2019	34	

== Music video ==
The music video for "Now That I Found You" was directed by Carlos López Estrada and Nelson DeCastro, and premiered on March 14, 2019. It shows Jepsen caring for a lost tabby cat, which was portrayed by the celebrity cat, Shrampton. The video contains product placement for Abarth cars, the TikTok app, and Beats headphones, as well as references to the Cats on Synthesizers in Space Instagram account and the final scenes of the film Breakfast at Tiffany's. The idea to use a cat in the video was inspired by an actual cat who was adopted by Jepsen's partner at the time of recording the song's vocals. The singer said that the video's basis upon a cat rather than a person was partially inspired by her previous single "Party for One".

== Live performances ==
Jepsen performed "Now That I Found You" for the first time on BBC Radio 1's Live Lounge on April 25, 2019. It was then included in the setlist of The Dedicated Tour.

== Track listing ==
Digital download
No.	Title	Writer(s)	Producer(s)	Length
1.	"Now That I Found You"	Carly Rae Jepsen; Benjamin Berger; Ryan McMahon; Ryan Rabin; Alexander O'Neill	Captain Cuts; Ayokay	3:20
2.	"No Drug Like Me"	Jepsen; John Hill; Jordan Palmer; Daniel Ledinsky; James Flannigan	Hill; Palmer	3:28
Total length:				6:48

Spotify bonus track
No.	Title	Writer(s)	Producer(s)	Length
3.	"Party for One"	Jepsen; Anton Rundberg; Julia Karlsson; Tavish Crowe	Captain Cuts; Hightower	3:03
Total length:				9:51

== Charts ==
Weekly chart performance for "Now That I Found You"
Chart (2019)	Peak position
China Airplay/FL (Billboard)	38
Japan Hot 100 (Billboard)	44
Japan Hot Overseas (Billboard)	6
US Pop Digital Songs (Billboard)	25

Annual chart rankings for "Now That I Found You"
Chart (2019)	Rank
Tokyo (Tokio Hot 100)	4

== Release history ==
Release dates and formats for "Now That I Found You"
Region	Date	Format	Label	Ref.
Russia	March 25, 2019	Contemporary hit radio	Universal	
