= Party for One =

Single by Carly Rae Jepsen

from the album Dedicated
- Released: November 1, 2018
- Genre: Synth-pop
- Length: 3:04
- Label: 604; School Boy; Interscope
- Songwriters: Carly Rae Jepsen; Tavish Crowe; Julia Karlsson; Anton Rundberg
- Producers: Captain Cuts; Hightower

Carly Rae Jepsen singles chronology
"Cut to the Feeling" (2017)	"Party for One" (2018)	"Now That I Found You" (2019)

Music video
- "Party for One" on YouTube

"Party for One" is a song by Canadian singer Carly Rae Jepsen. It was released as the lead single from her fourth studio album Dedicated on November 1, 2018, through 604, School Boy and Interscope Records. The track was written by Jepsen, Tavish Crowe, Julia Karlsson, and Anton Rundberg, and produced by Hightower and Captain Cuts. "Party for One" was placed on Rolling Stone's list of 50 Best Songs of 2018.

== Background ==
Jepsen worked on the song for some time, first writing the melody with her long-time collaborator Tavish Crowe. The lyrics were inspired by staying in a hotel room in Sweden on her own, at a time when she was going through a break-up. The singer explained that the song is about "what it is to celebrate time with yourself". Matt Moen of Paper described the song as a "self-care anthem" or something to help refrain from texting an ex. Mike Wass of Idolator said that as the lead single for Jepsen's fourth studio album, it is "likely to cement her status as the hipster's guilty pleasure with a collection of cute, clever and slightly offbeat bops". A number of critics noted references to masturbation in the song's lyrics.

Jepsen posted an image of herself to social media on October 30, 2018, captioning it "Party for one", confirming social media rumours about the song's impending release after it was registered with Broadcast Music, Inc. (BMI). Despite being promoted as the lead single from Dedicated, "Party for One" is not included in the standard track listing and only appears on select digital and deluxe editions of the album.

== Critical reception ==
Upon its release, "Party for One" received critical acclaim. Brittany Spanos of Rolling Stone called the song "upbeat" and "bubbly". Brooke Bajgrowicz of Billboard said the track is "driven by an electric beat" and compared its "infectious pop sound" to "Call Me Maybe" and "I Really Like You". Writing for Pitchfork, Bobby Finger felt that "In the pantheon of pop breakup anthems, Jepsen's newest single lacks the aching detail of 'Dancing on My Own' or the Max Martin alchemy of 'Since U Been Gone,' but it's a satisfying intimation that E•MO•TION could be getting a sequel soon". Roisin O'Connor of The Independent named "Party for One" a "glimmering gem of a synth-pop track".

=== Year-end lists ===
Publication	Year	Accolade	Rank	Ref.
Pitchfork	2018	100 Best Songs of 2018	89	
Rolling Stone	2018	50 Best Songs of 2018	26	

== Music video ==
The music video, directed by Bardia Zeinali, was released on November 1, 2018. It features Jepsen checking into a hotel for the night before showing scenes of other people in the same hotel alone in their rooms, doing various things such as dancing, crying, eating and putting on makeup. The power then goes out, which causes everybody to walk down to the lobby, where they have a party before returning to their rooms. Roisin O'Connor of The Independent called the video "fun, even if it is one giant advert for Absolut Vodka". On December 11, 2018, Jepsen released a vertical video of the song on YouTube.

== Live performances ==
Jepsen performed "Party for One" for the first time on The Tonight Show Starring Jimmy Fallon on November 5, 2018. The song was performed live throughout The Dedicated Tour.

== Track listing ==
- Digital download/Streaming
1. "Party for One" — 3:03
- Digital Remix EP
1. "Party for One" (More Giraffes Remix) — 2:46
2. "Party for One" (Sawyr Remix) — 3:02
3. "Party for One" (Anki Remix) — 3:29

== Charts ==
Chart (2018)	Peak position
Australia Digital Tracks (ARIA)	48
Canada Hot 100 (Billboard)	100
Ireland (IRMA)	98
Japan (Japan Hot 100)	68
New Zealand Hot Singles (RMNZ)	19
US Pop Digital Songs (Billboard)	20

== Release history ==
Release dates and formats for "Party for One"
Region	Date	Format	Version	Label	Ref.
Canada	November 1, 2018	Digital download; streaming	Original	604	
Italy	November 9, 2018	Contemporary hit radio	Original	Universal	
Various	December 14, 2018	Digital download; streaming	Remixes	Schoolboy; Interscope	
