= Carly Rae Jepsen =

Canadian singer and songwriter (born 1985)

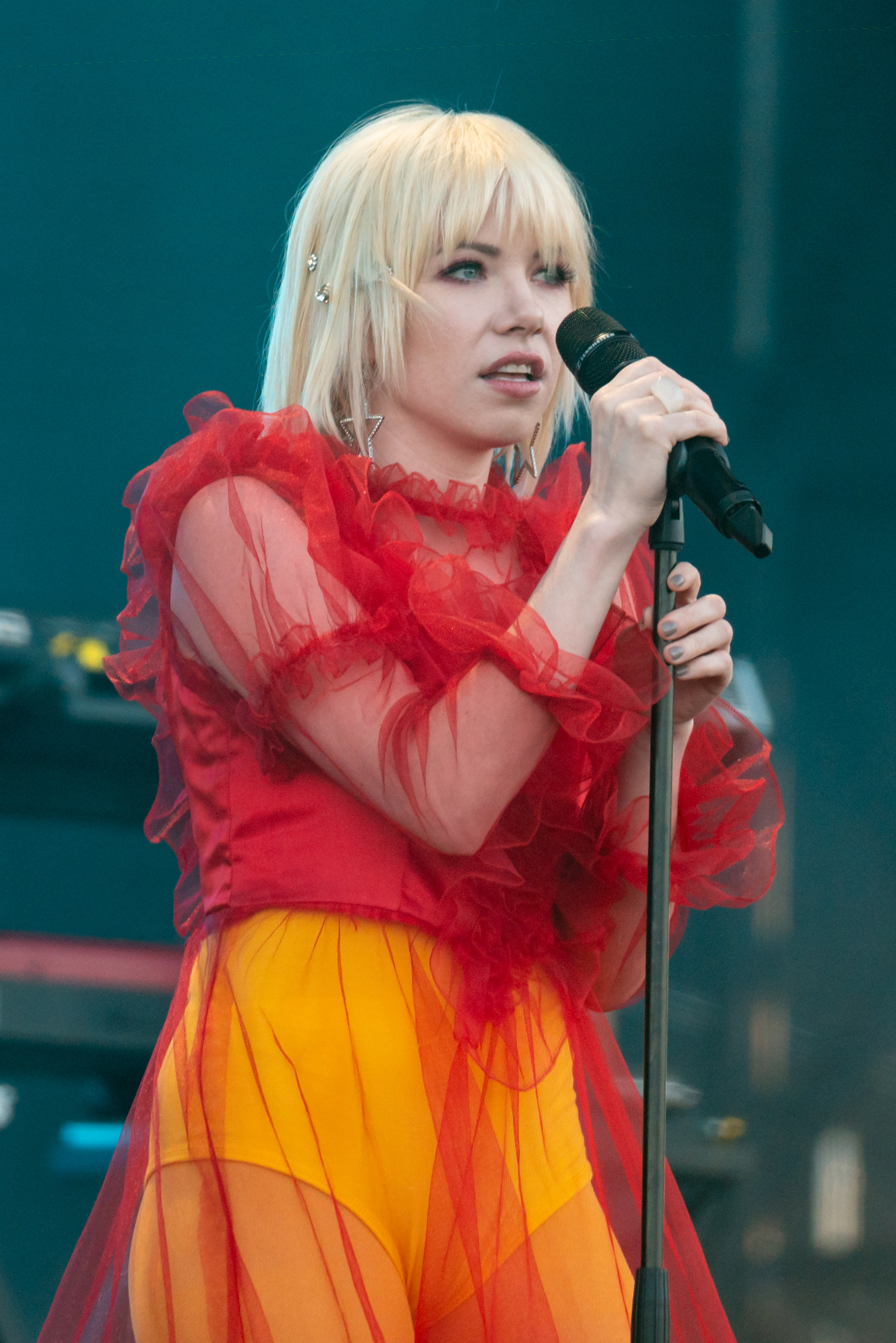
- Carly Rae Jepsen in 2019
- Born: November 21, 1985 (age 41); Mission, British Columbia, Canada
- Occupations: Singer; songwriter; actress
- Years active: 2007–present
- Spouse: Cole M.G.N. (m. 2025)
- Children: 1
- Musical career
- Genres: Pop; disco; folk
- Instrument: Vocals
- Works: Discography; songs
- Labels: MapleMusic; Fontana North; 604; Schoolboy; Interscope
- Website: carlyraemusic.com

Carly Rae Jepsen (Danish: [ˈjɛpsən] YEP-sən; born November 21, 1985) is a Canadian singer, songwriter and actress. After studying musical theatre for most of her school life and while in university, Jepsen garnered mainstream attention after placing third on the fifth season of Canadian Idol in 2007. Jepsen released her folk-influenced debut studio album Tug of War the following year.

Jepsen's breakthrough came during 2012, when her acclaimed single "Call Me Maybe", which was declared the best-selling single of the year, sold over 18 million copies. It reached number one in more than 19 countries, and led to major record deals with Schoolboy Records and Interscope Records. Jepsen's second studio album, Kiss, was released later that year and included the single "Good Time" with Owl City; both charted in the top ten in Canada and the United States. In 2014, Jepsen made her Broadway theatre stage debut, playing the titular character in Cinderella for 12 weeks. The following year, she released her third studio album, Emotion which included the single "I Really Like You". In 2016, Jepsen performed in the television special Grease: Live and voiced in the animated film Ballerina.

In 2019, Jepsen released the Dance Club Songs number-one single "OMG" alongside Gryffin, and her fourth studio album, Dedicated, with a B-side follow-up titled Dedicated Side B a year later. Her sixth studio album, The Loneliest Time, was released in October 2022. Its companion album, The Loveliest Time, followed in July 2023. In September 2026, she released her eighth studio album, Day and Night, which received acclaim.

Jepsen has received three Juno Awards, three Billboard Music Awards, and an Allan Slaight Award. She has also been nominated for Grammy Awards, MTV Video Music Awards, Polaris Music Prize, and People's Choice Awards. Jepsen ranked number 75 on Billboard Top Women Artists of the 21st Century Chart published on March 14, 2025.

== Early life ==
Jepsen was born on November 21, 1985, in Mission, British Columbia, to Alexandra and Larry Jepsen, the second of their three children. She is of Danish, English and Scottish descent. Jepsen has an older brother, Colin, and a younger sister, Katie. She attended Heritage Park Secondary School and had a passion for musical theatre, appearing in student productions of Annie where she played Annie, Grease where she played Sandy Olsson, and The Wiz where she played Dorothy Gale. Her parents and stepparents were teachers, so Jepsen considered a career in music instruction as a second option. She applied to music-related programs, including those at Capilano University and the University of British Columbia, but on the advice of her high school drama teacher, she auditioned for the Canadian College of Performing Arts in Oak Bay, British Columbia, and was one of 25 female students to gain admission into its year-long program in 2004.

After graduation, Jepsen relocated to Vancouver's west side and held several jobs, including as a barista, assistant pastry chef, and bartender. At this time, she slept on a pull-out sofa and wrote songs in her spare time.

== Career ==
=== 2007–2010: Canadian Idol and Tug of War ===
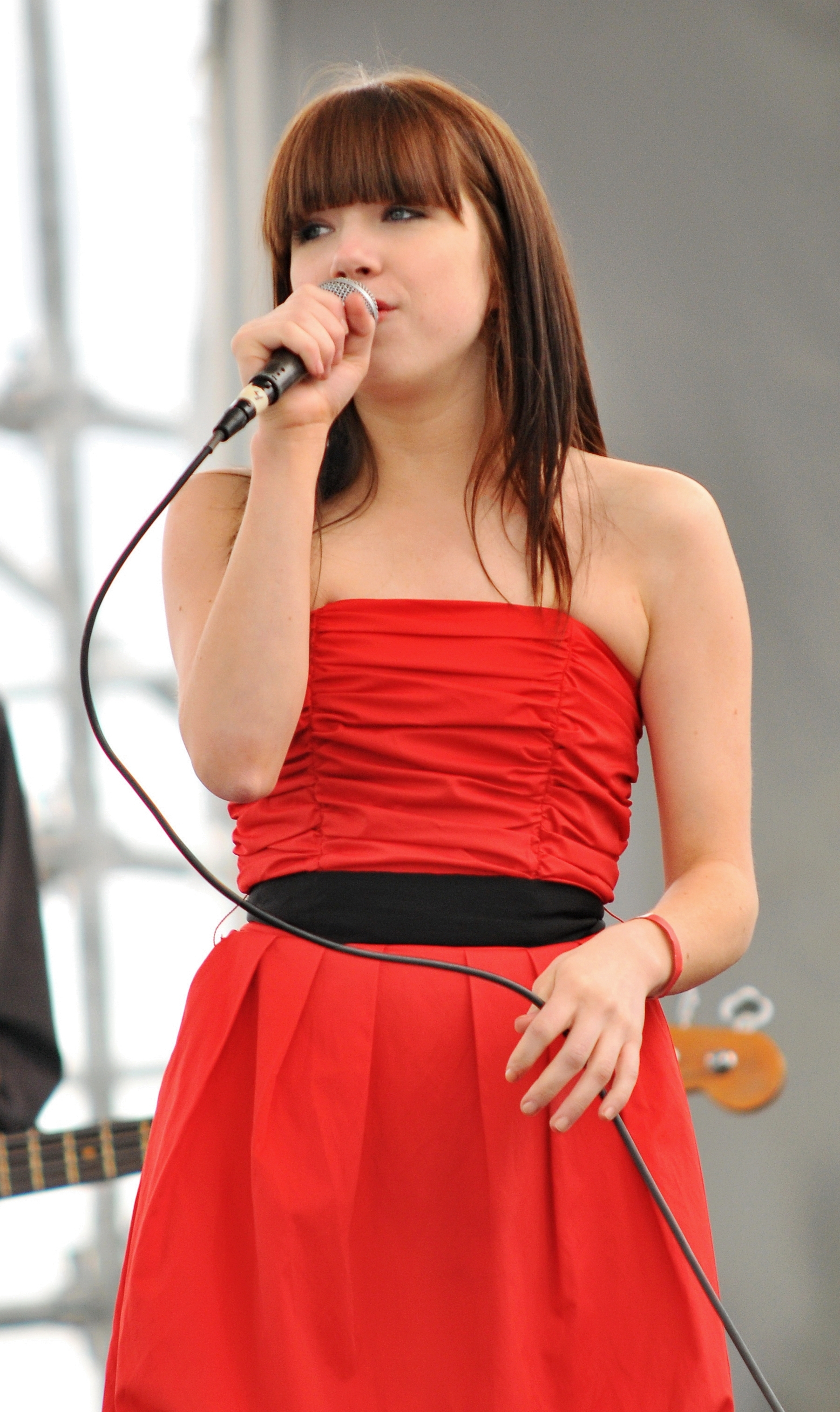
Jepsen performing on Canada Day in 2010

In 2007, Jepsen was convinced to audition for Canadian Idol by her high school drama teacher. In the audition, she performed her original song "Sweet Talker". In the competition, she finished in third place, which she considered the best possible outcome in retrospect. Her demo recording attracted the attention of music manager Jonathan Simkin, who signed Jepsen to a management deal with 604 Records that year. Jepsen released her first promotional single, a cover of John Denver's song "Sunshine on My Shoulders", in June 2008. Her debut studio album, Tug of War, was released in September 2008, and sold 10,000 copies in Canada. The singles "Tug of War" and "Bucket" peaked in the top 40 of the Canadian Hot 100, and received Gold certifications for sales of 40,000 units each. "Sour Candy", a duet with Josh Ramsay of Marianas Trench was released as the final single. In 2009, Jepsen toured western Canada with Marianas Trench and Shiloh.

==== Canadian Idol performances ====
Episode	Theme	Song choice	Original artist	Order	Result
Audition	N/A	"Sweet Talker"	Original song	N/A	Advanced
Top 80	N/A	"I Try"	Macy Gray	Duets	Advanced
Top 40	N/A	"Breathe (2 AM)"	Anna Nalick	N/A	Advanced
Top 22	N/A	"Put Your Records On"	Corinne Bailey Rae	11	Advanced
Top 18	N/A	"Sweet Ones"	Sarah Slean	4	Advanced
Top 14	N/A	"Waiting in Vain"	Bob Marley and the Wailers	3	Advanced
Top 10	Number One Hits	"Inside and Out"	Bee Gees	3	Bottom 3
Top 9	The 1960s	"Georgia on My Mind"	Hoagy Carmichael and his Orchestra	5	Safe
Top 8	Unplugged	"Torn"	Ednaswap	7	Safe
Top 7	Queen	"Killer Queen"	Queen	3	Bottom 3
Top 6	Pop-Rock	"Come to My Window"	Melissa Etheridge	4	Bottom 3
Top 5	My Own Idol	"Chuck E's in Love"	Rickie Lee Jones	4	Safe
Top 4	Standards	"My Heart Belongs to Daddy"	Mary Martin	1	Safe
Top 4	Standards	"I Got It Bad (and That Ain't Good)"	Ivie Anderson	5	Safe
Top 3	Judge's Choice & People's Choice	"At Seventeen"	Janis Ian	3	Eliminated
Top 3	Judge's Choice & People's Choice	"White Flag"	Dido	6	Eliminated

=== 2011–2014: Mainstream success with Curiosity and Kiss ===
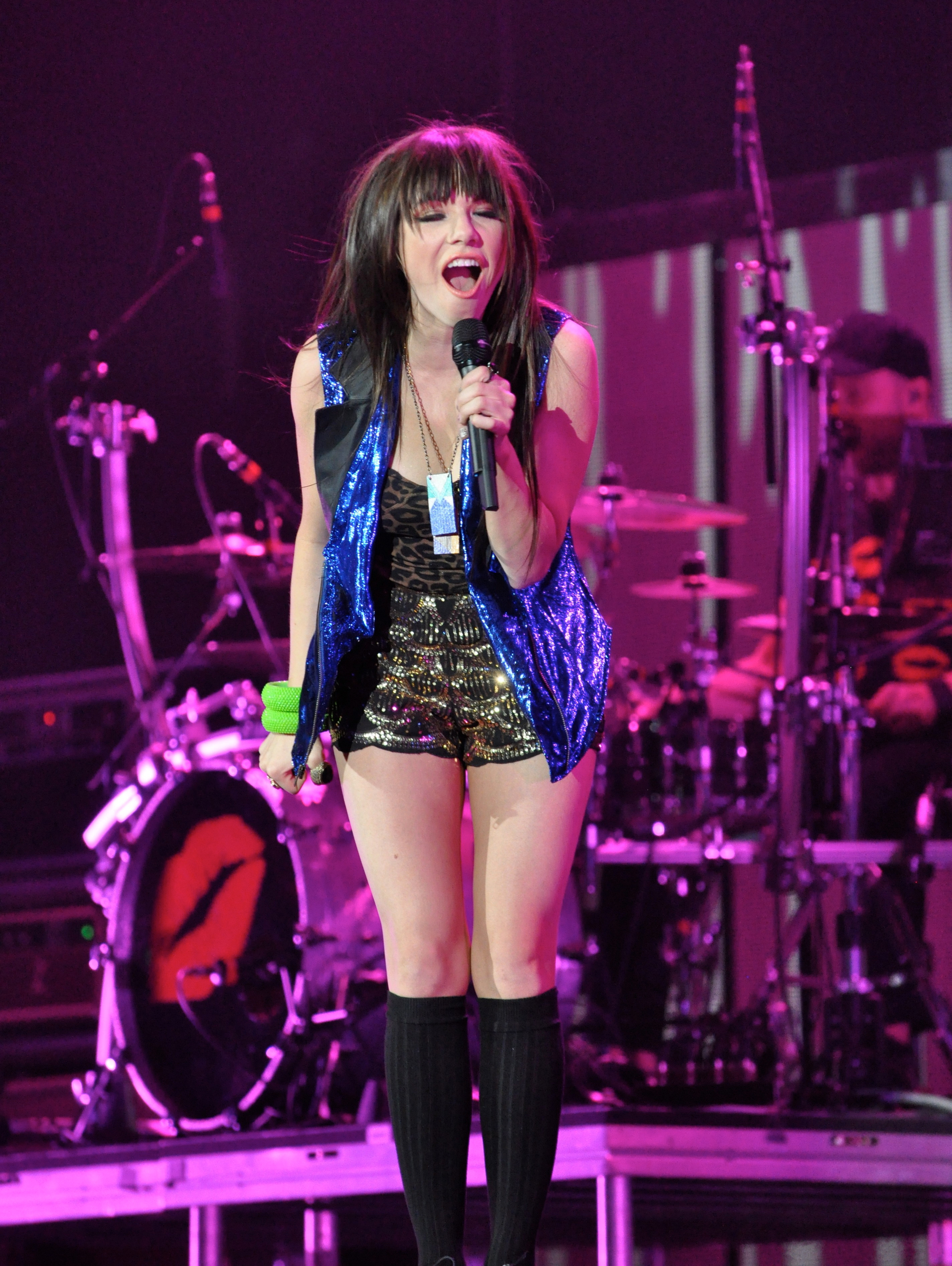
Jepsen performing on Justin Bieber's Believe Tour in 2012

In the summer of 2011, Jepsen recorded material for her second studio album with Josh Ramsay, Ryan Stewart, and Tavish Crowe. The track "Call Me Maybe", co-written by Crowe and Ramsay, was released in September 2011. The song received a promotion from fellow Canadian pop singer Justin Bieber, leading Bieber's manager, Scooter Braun, to sign Jepsen to a joint worldwide recording contract with his label, Schoolboy Records, and major label Interscope Records. "Call Me Maybe" reached number one on the Canadian Hot 100, making Jepsen the fourth Canadian artist to top the chart. In the US, the single spent nine weeks at number one on the Billboard Hot 100, earning the title "Song of the Summer" from Billboard magazine. The single was the best-selling single of 2012 worldwide and topped the charts in 19 countries, including the United Kingdom, where it was the year's second best-selling single. The song was included on Jepsen's six-track EP, Curiosity, released in February 2012 in Canada. Following the success of "Call Me Maybe", Jepsen recorded the top ten duet "Good Time" with Owl City, released in June 2012.

Jepsen's second studio album, Kiss, was released in September 2012 and included the singles "This Kiss" and "Tonight I'm Getting Over You". It reached the top ten chart positions in Australia, the UK, Canada and the US. The same year, Jepsen became a spokesperson and model for clothing retailer Wet Seal and appeared on the fifth-season premiere episode of The CW primetime soap opera 90210. At the 2012 Billboard Music Awards, Jepsen was the first Canadian recipient of the Rising Star Award while "Call Me Maybe" later received nominations for Song of the Year and Best Pop Solo Performance at the 55th Annual Grammy Awards.

In January 2013, Jepsen became a spokesperson for clothing and footwear brand Candie's. She released new ads for the brand in July 2013. At the Juno Awards of 2013, Kiss won Album of the Year and Pop Album of the Year while Call Me Maybe won Single of the Year. In June 2013, Kiss: The Remix, a compilation album containing remixes and instrumentals of singles from Kiss, was released in Japan and peaked at number 157 on the Oricon albums chart. From June to October 2013, Jepsen embarked on The Summer Kiss Tour in North America and Asia.

In Spring 2014, she performed in the Broadway theatre production of Rodgers and Hammerstein's Cinderella for 12 weeks. In June 2014, Jepsen won the International Achievement Award at the SOCAN Awards alongside co-writers Josh Ramsay and Tavish Crowe.

=== 2015–2017: Emotion and other projects ===
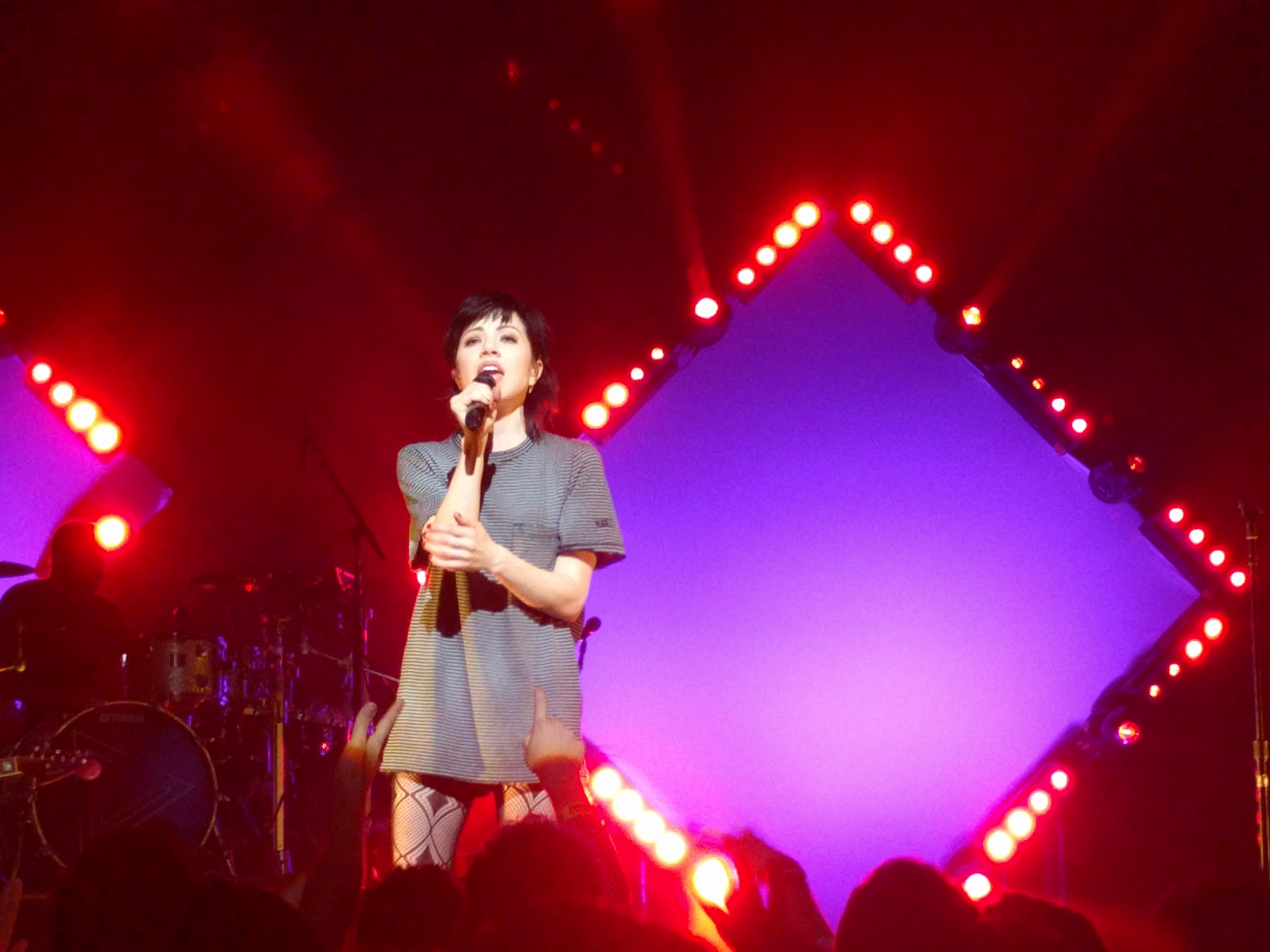
Jepsen performing on her Gimmie Love Tour in 2016

Jepsen released her third album's lead single, "I Really Like You", in March 2015. Accompanied by a music video in which actor Tom Hanks lip-synced to the song, it peaked at number 14 in Canada and the top five in the UK. The studio album, titled Emotion, was released in June 2015. Although it was a relative commercial failure compared to Kiss, it received critical acclaim and a cult following, attracting a more mature audience to her music. The album peaked at number eight in Canada and at number 16 on the US Billboard 200. It includes collaborations with Rostam Batmanglij, Sia, Dev Hynes, Greg Kurstin, and Ariel Rechtshaid. The second single, "Run Away with Me", was released in July 2015. In November 2015, Jepsen embarked on the Gimmie Love Tour in support of Emotion. Jepsen was featured on a new version of Bleachers' song "Shadow" from their album Terrible Thrills, Vol. 2 and released a cover of Wham!'s "Last Christmas". In December 2015, Jepsen recorded the theme song for the Netflix series Fuller House, a remake of the theme to Full House.

In January 2016, Jepsen played Frenchy in Grease Live!, Fox's live television presentation of the musical Grease. As part of her role, she performed a new song entitled "All I Need Is an Angel". In March 2016, she appeared on the Knocks' debut studio album 55. In August 2016, Jepsen released Emotion: Side B, an EP containing eight cut tracks from Emotion. The EP received critical acclaim from Rolling Stone and Pitchfork. In May 2017, Jepsen released the single "Cut to the Feeling". The song was originally intended for Emotion, but instead appeared in the animated film Ballerina, in which Jepsen voices a supporting role. It also appeared on the Japanese deluxe version of the Side B EP.

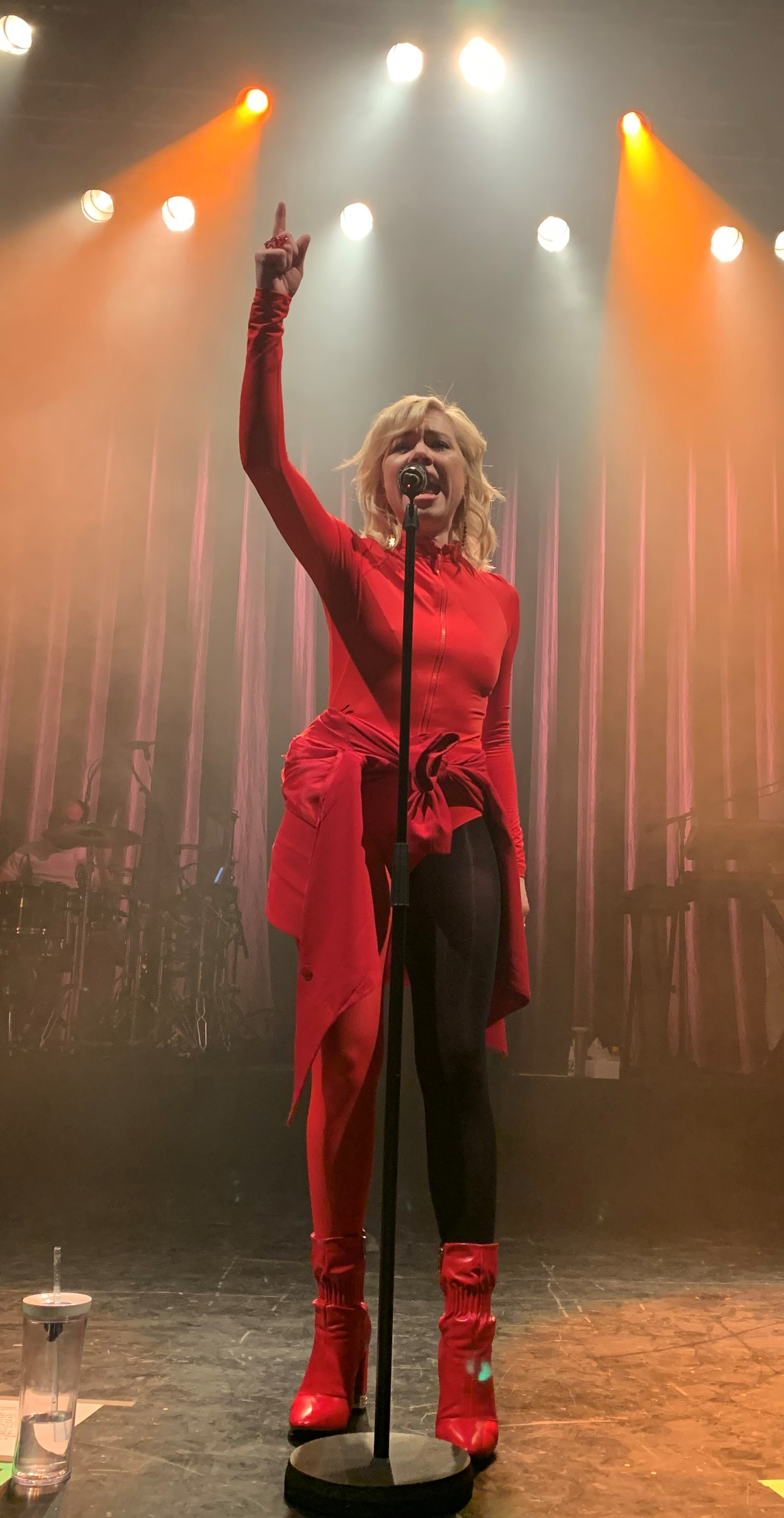
Jepsen performing on her Dedicated Tour in 2020

=== 2018–2020: Dedicated ===
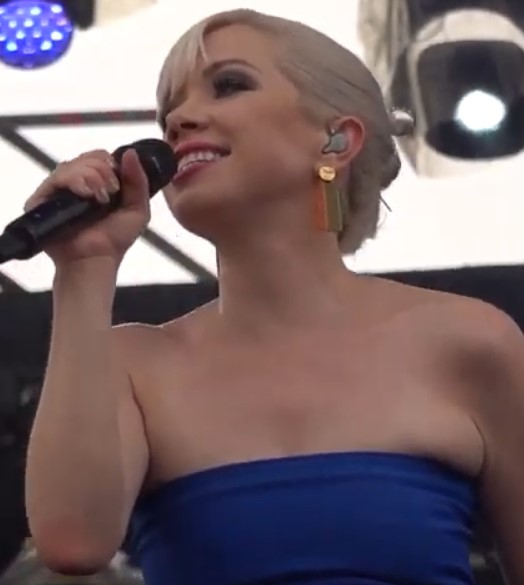
Jepsen performing in Seoul, South Korea, 2019

In early 2018, Jepsen appeared as the opening act for American singer Katy Perry's Witness: The Tour. "Party for One", the lead single from Jepsen's fourth studio album, was released in November. Two more singles, "Now That I Found You" and "No Drug Like Me", followed in February 2019, with "Julien" and "Too Much" being released as the fourth and fifth respective singles. By then, Braun was no longer Jepsen's manager, although she was still signed to Schoolboy Records.

Her fourth studio album, Dedicated, was released on May 17, 2019, with a tour beginning June 27. Jepsen performed NPR's Tiny Desk Concert in November. On May 21, 2020, the companion album Dedicated Side B was released, containing twelve additional tracks from Dedicated. In October, Jepsen released "It's Not Christmas Till Somebody Cries" which peaked at 11 on the US Holiday Digital Songs chart.

=== 2021–2025: The Loneliest Time and The Loveliest Time ===
Following Dedicated Side B's release, Jepsen confirmed that she was making a "quarantine album" alongside long-time friend and songwriter Tavish Crowe, whom she wrote "Call Me Maybe" with. In May 2022, Jepsen announced at her Coachella performance the lead single from her sixth studio album, "Western Wind", which was released on May 6, 2022. On August 3, 2022, Jepsen announced via her social media the release of her sixth studio album, The Loneliest Time, released on October 21, 2022, and shortly after released the second single from the album, "Beach House" and the third single "Talking to Yourself" the following month. The title track featuring Rufus Wainwright, was the fourth and final single for the album, releasing on October 8, 2022. On social media platform TikTok, the song became a viral success amassing nearly 200,000 videos since its release, and amongst those videos celebrities such as Meghan Trainor. Following the album's release, the album debuted at number 18 on the Canadian Albums Chart, number 19 on the Billboard 200, and number 16 on the UK Albums Chart, becoming her highest-charting album in the UK in ten years. In support and for the promotion of the album, Jepsen embarked on The So Nice Tour beginning in September 2022 and played shows across North America, Europe, and Australia through March 2023. The tour was extended in March 2023 with six dates in Japan. Jepsen performed the theme song for the Amazon Kids+ series Hello Kitty: Super Style!, which debuted in December 2022.

On June 23, 2023, less than a year after the release of The Loneliest Time, Jepsen released a new disco-inspired single "Shy Boy", produced by James Ford. It was accompanied by a prominently black-and-white music video featuring Jepsen on a date with a lover. On July 6, 2023, after teasing songs and producers involved with the project, Jepsen formally announced her seventh studio album The Loveliest Time, described as a "companion album" to The Loneliest Time. It was released on July 28.

=== 2026: Day and Night ===
In June 2026, Jepsen revealed her upcoming eighth studio album, Day and Night, would be a double album. Its lead single, "On Wires" was released on June 26, 2026. On July 16, 2026, she released the album's second single, "After All". On August 7, 2026, she released the album's third single, "Don't Leave Me on the Dance Floor". The album was released on September 18, 2026, to critical acclaim.

== Artistry ==
=== Musical style ===
Jepsen has been noted for her "subversively catchy lyrics, slick musical arrangements, and pop experimentation". Jepsen is classified as a soprano. Paul Bradley of LA Weekly described Jepsen's voice as "hushed" and "flawless" while Maura Johnston of Slate characterised it as "airy yet precise".

Jepsen says she shares her parents' interest in folk music as a result of her upbringing, naming artists such as Leonard Cohen, Bruce Springsteen, James Taylor, and Van Morrison as inspirations for her debut studio album, Tug of War (2008). During the recording of her EP Curiosity and her second studio album, Kiss (both 2012), Jepsen said she became increasingly influenced by pop and dance music, in particular the works of Dragonette, Kimbra, La Roux, and Robyn. Her third studio album, Emotion (2015), drew from her love of 1980s pop artists including Cyndi Lauper, Madonna, and Prince.

Jepsen has expressed admiration for Cat Power, Christine and the Queens, Tegan and Sara, Bleachers, Kate Bush, Bob Dylan, Sky Ferreira, Dev Hynes, Solange Knowles, Joni Mitchell, Sinéad O'Connor, the Spice Girls, Hank Williams, and Taylor Swift.

=== Impact ===
Jepsen has been referred to as a queer icon, having performed at several pride parades. In March 2013, Jepsen pulled out of performing at the Boy Scouts of America 2013 National Scout Jamboree due to their policy on homosexuality.

== Personal life ==
In September 2024, Jepsen announced her engagement to the American record producer Cole M.G.N. They married on October 4, 2025. Their first child was born in March 2026.

== Discography ==
- Tug of War (2008)
- Kiss (2012)
- Emotion (2015)
- Dedicated (2019)
- Dedicated Side B (2020)
- The Loneliest Time (2022)
- The Loveliest Time (2023)
- Day and Night (2026)

== Tours ==
Headlining

- The Summer Kiss Tour (2013)
- Gimmie Love Tour (2015–2016)
- The Dedicated Tour (2019–2020)
- The So Nice Tour (2022–2023)
- Day and Night Tour (2027)

Co-headlining

- Marianas Trench, the New Cities and the Mission District – Beside You Tour (2009)

Opening act

- Hanson – Shout It Out World Tour (Canadian dates) (2012)
- Justin Bieber – Believe Tour (North American, European, and South American dates) (2012–2013)
- Hedley – Hello World Tour (Canadian dates) (2016)
- Katy Perry – Witness: The Tour (North American dates) (2018)
- Boygenius – The Tour (select North American dates) (2023)

== Filmography ==
=== Television ===
Year	Title	Role	Notes
2007	Canadian Idol	Herself/contestant	Season five: finished in 3rd place
2012	90210	Herself	Season five premiere: "Til Death Do Us Part"
2013	Shake It Up	Herself	Season three, episode 10: "My Fair Librarian It Up"
2015	Saturday Night Live	Herself/Musical guest	Season 40, episode 17
2015	Castle	Herself	Season seven, episode 22: "Dead from New York"
2015	Comedy Bang! Bang!	Herself	Season four, episode 24: "Carly Rae Jepsen Wears a Chunky Necklace and Black Ankle Boots"
2016	Grease Live!	Frenchy	Special
2016	Fuller House	Musical performer	Theme song
2022	Hello Kitty: Super Style!	Musical performer	Theme song

=== Film ===
Year	Title	Role	Notes
2014	Lennon or McCartney	Herself	Short film; interview clip
2016	Ballerina	Odette	Voice role

== Theatre ==
Year	Title	Role	Notes
2014	Rodgers + Hammerstein's Cinderella	Ella	Broadway appearance
