= Schoolboy Records =

American record label

- Parent company: Schoolboy Entertainment (Hybe America); Universal Music Group
- Founded: 2007
- Founder: Scooter Braun
- Distributors: Republic Records (in the US); Universal Music Group (in the UK)
- Genre: Various
- Country of origin: United States
- Location: Santa Monica, California
- Official website: Official site

Schoolboy Records is an American record label established in 2007 by Scooter Braun, as an imprint of Universal Music Group's Republic Records.

Schoolboy Records' first success was with Asher Roth's 2009 single, "I Love College," along with his debut album, Asleep in the Bread Aisle. The label saw further success with Carly Rae Jepsen, whose 2011 single,"Call Me Maybe," peaked atop the Billboard Hot 100. The label saw its furthest success international success with Korean rapper Psy, whose 2012 single, "Gangnam Style," peaked multiple international charts.

== Roster ==
Adapted from label's official website.

- Carly Rae Jepsen (outside Canada)
- Psy
- Push Baby (formerly known as Rixton)
- Sheppard
- CL

== Former artists ==
- Amber Riley
- Who Is Fancy
- Todrick Hall
- Martin Garrix
- DeathbyRomy
- Tori Kelly
- Social House
- Madison Beer
