= Emotion Remixed + =

Remix album by Carly Rae Jepsen
- Released: March 18, 2016
- Length: 38:37
- Label: 604; School Boy; Interscope

Carly Rae Jepsen chronology
Emotion (2015)	Emotion Remixed + (2016)	Emotion: Side B (2016)

Emotion Remixed + (stylized as E•MO•TION REMIXED +, symbol read as "plus") is the second remix album by Canadian singer Carly Rae Jepsen, released through Universal Music Japan on March 18, 2016. In the vein of Kiss: the Remix, both Japan exclusives, Emotion Remixed + compiles eight remixes of singles released from her third studio album Emotion (2015), and two new tracks: "First Time" and "Fever". The compilation features contributions by Bleachers, the Knocks and a cohort of collaborators from her Emotion sessions.

"First Time" was given a limited promotional release. The new songs were subsequently included on Jepsen's companion release Emotion: Side B (2016); and were given a second Japanese release through the country's exclusive reissue of the EP in 2017. Remixed + was primarily supported by Jepsen's two headlining performances at Popspring 2016 in Tokyo and Kobe.

== Background and release ==
The new renditions on Emotion Remixed + were previously released throughout 2015, several as a part of the original singles' accompanying remix packages. The compilation features contributions from returning musicians and future collaborators. Jepsen worked with Jack Antonoff during the production process of Emotion, though his contributions did not make the final cut. Antonoff's remix of "I Really Like You", released under his Bleachers moniker, premiered through Stereogum on July 9, 2015; following the blog's exclusive Blasterjaxx remix earlier that April. Jepsen would later contribute to the Bleachers cover album Terrible Thrills, Vol. 2, before lending her vocals to a collaboration on Gone Now (2017). The Y2K "Run Away with Me" remix made its Idolator premiere on August 12, 2015. The Knocks' rendition of "All That" was originally a "technically illegal" bootleg posted to SoundCloud on April 17, 2015; the pair stated that Jepsen's fondness for the remix gave it an official release. Jepsen would later feature on their debut album 55 (2016). Skylar Spence previously remixed Jepsen's "Call Me Maybe" in 2012, under the name Saint Pepsi, before being commissioned for "Your Type". It was given an exclusive Billboard debut on December 18, 2015.

Universal Music Japan announced Emotion Remixed + (Note: The album is officially credited in katakana as エモーション・リミックス+ (Emōshon Rimikkusu Purasu).) on February 16, 2016, in commemoration of the first Popspring festival later that April, where Jepsen was set to headline. Her appearance was announced two months prior. The release was billed as a "special present" from Carly to her Japanese fans, though speaking to the Japan Times, the album gave Jepsen an opportunity to "present her music in another context" as well. Emotion Remixed + features two then-unreleased songs, "First Time" and "Fever", which were in the running for inclusion on the parent album–ultimately left off due to time constraints: "They’re still just as important to me as the songs on Emotion, so it was a great opportunity to put out this remix album and add something new and two of my favorite songs from this cycle."

Remixed + was released as a standard jewel case, featuring a sticker of the album artwork and a CD booklet that folds out as a mini poster. The album's photography was done by Hazel and Pine. In addition to her Popspring performances, Jepsen appeared on the March 31, 2016, broadcast of the HTB Ichioshi! Morning (イチオシ！モーニング) show.

== Composition ==
"Like collaborations, [remixes are] two different minds coming together to create something that one of you could have made on your own. [...] All of the remixes on this album were by people who were either fans of the music or had a new vision of the song and wanted their turn with it."

"First Time" was co-penned with Rami Yacoub, Carl Falk and Wayne Hector; its production handled by the former two. The song was conceived during the same sessions as "Your Type". "Fever" was written with Kyle Shearer, Nate Campany and Saul Alexander Castillo Vasquez, and produced solely by Shearer. Its co-writers have contributed to several of Jepsen's Emotion offerings.

Y2K called "Run Away with Me" one of their favourite pop songs of 2015, their treatment gives it a "sweeping electro overhaul" with marching band beats. Its intro is reminiscent of the Japanese stringed instrument koto. Skylar Spence's "slick and airy", "warped disco" rework of "Your Type" is noted by Spin's Colin Joyce as utilizing "cut up samples and disorienting modulation". The song takes an "airier, more glittery approach" through the Young Bombs remix. Blasterjaxx casts "I Really Like You" in "darker, more grown up tones" with a "thumping electronic exoskeleton". The Bleachers remix is noted for Antonoff's signature "staccato touches" and a layering of marching drums. Its "sweeping synths" depart from the original's bubblegum-pop for a "charming '80s-inspired groove" as opined by Bianca Gracie of Idolator. The Bleachers remix was listed in Eliza Thompson's "5 Songs You Need to Hear This Week" for Cosmopolitan, calling its '80s sheen "dreamy". The Knocks' transform "All That" into a "pulsating house anthem" as opined by Bustle's Alex Kritselis, whereas Gracie calls it a "modern disco groove".

== Commercial performance ==
Remixed + has shifted 2,477 copies in Japan as of April 2016. "First Time" peaked on the Billboard Japan Hot 100 at number 71 on March 28, 2016. It also peaked on the Billboard Japan Hot Overseas chart at number eight, and the Billboard Japan Radio Songs chart at number nine.

== Track listing ==
Emotion Remixed + track listing
No.	Title	Length
1.	"First Time"	3:35
2.	"Fever"	3:03
3.	"Run Away with Me" (Velvet Sunrise remix)	3:46
4.	"Run Away with Me" (Y2K remix)	4:28
5.	"Your Type (Skylar Spence remix)"	3:50
6.	"Your Type" (Young Bombs remix)	4:22
7.	"I Really Like You" (Blasterjaxx remix)	3:35
8.	"I Really Like You" (M. Rod remix)	3:24
9.	"I Really Like You" (Bleachers remix)	3:25
10.	"All That" (The Knocks remix)	5:09
Total length:		38:37

== Release history ==
Release history and formats for Emotion Remixed +
Region	Date	Format	Label
Japan	March 18, 2016	Digital download, CD	Universal Music
