= Emotion: Side B =

EP by Carly Rae Jepsen
- Released: August 26, 2016
- Recorded: 2014–2015
- Genres: Pop; bubblegum pop
- Length: 27:38
- Labels: 604; School Boy; Interscope
- Producers: CJ Baran; Carl Falk; Greg Kurstin; Rami; Ben Romans; Nick Ruth; Kyle Shearer; Sir Nolan; Ryan Stewart; TMS

Carly Rae Jepsen chronology
| Emotion Remixed + (2016) | Emotion: Side B (2016) | Dedicated (2019) |

Emotion: Side B (stylized as E•MO•TION: Side B) is the third extended play (EP) by Canadian singer Carly Rae Jepsen. It was released on August 26, 2016, by 604, Schoolboy and Interscope Records. Jepsen developed Side B as a companion piece to her third studio album, Emotion (2015), in response to fan demand. Side B features unreleased songs that were cut from the original effort.

Like its parent album, Side B takes heavy influence from 1980s pop music, with lyrical narratives that revolve around love and heartbreak. Several writers and producers on Emotion reprised their roles on Side B, including Greg Kurstin, Dev Hynes, and Rami Yacoub. The EP received favourable reviews upon its release and was placed on several critics' lists for best of the year. The Japan-exclusive edition of the EP was supplemented with the song "Cut to the Feeling", a Jepsen single for the Canadian-French film Ballerina (2016). Emotion: Side B has sold 17,000 copies worldwide as of 2021.

== Background and development ==
Jepsen worked on her third studio album, Emotion (2015), for nearly three years and wrote over 250 songs in the process. From its inception in Los Angeles, Jepsen began to stray away from "mass-produced" writing sessions where she was unable to contribute in a significant way. After completing the title track "Emotion", the songs Jepsen developed thereafter became "essentials" that could anchor the album as opposed to being throwaway material. When the time came to sequence Emotion, Jepsen's label gave her a hard limit of 17 tracks to work with. Jepsen later said:

The metamorphosis of the tracklists I've made for Emotion have probably changed six times. I have a little easel board with it painted on and I'd come home from a session and then I'd write down a song I liked better than having to decide which song to take out. I had to rebuild it and give it a facelift almost every week.

Emotion was released in Japan in June 2015 and worldwide in August 2015. Despite receiving positive reviews from music critics, it was met with underwhelming commercial success. The album developed a cult following and Jepsen grew to become a "critical" or "indie darling". She embarked on the Gimmie Love Tour in support of the album in late 2015. She cited repeated requests from fans during the tour to release an "Emotion 2.0" as an inspiration for Emotion: Side B. Speaking to radio station WMSC in March 2016, Jepsen expressed a desire to release these songs, stating that she'd been contemplating an Emotion 2.0-type release. The remix album, Emotion Remixed + was released exclusively in Japan on March 2, 2016, marking the first appearance of the songs "First Time" and "Fever", which she began performing on the second US leg of her tour.

== Composition ==
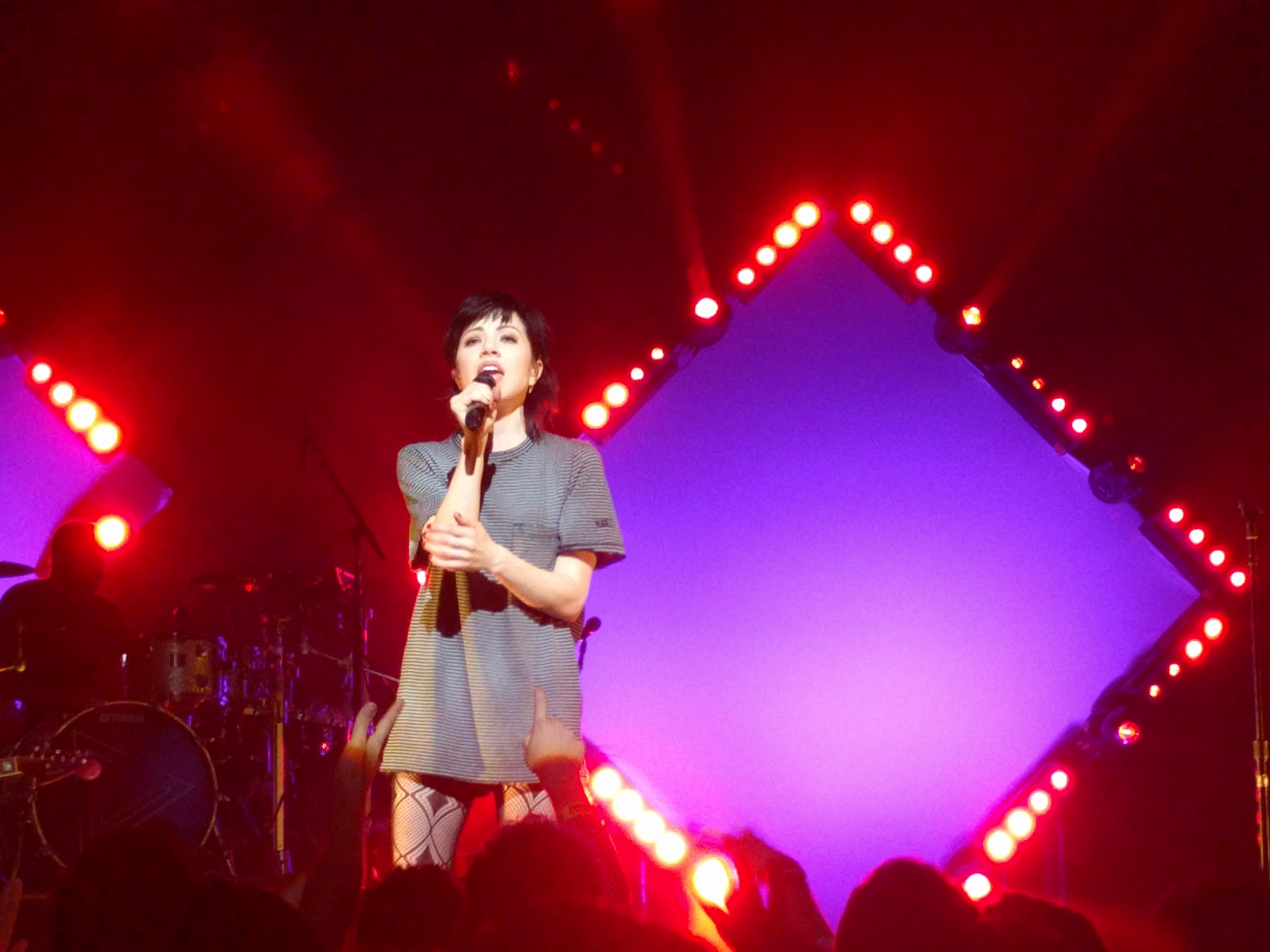
Jepsen during Gimmie Love Tour in San Francisco on February 27, 2016

The EP opens with a distorted cassette-recording of the chorus to "First Time", co-written with the same ensemble behind Jepsen's "Your Type". A synth-funk song, its bubblegum instrumental contrasts with Jepsen's pleas to rekindle a relationship, channeling the "breeziness" of the Jets' "Crush on You". In "Higher", Jepsen sings about a relationship in which she is swept off her feet. Brad Nelson of Pitchfork called it "the most transparent 'love' song" from her Emotion offerings". "Higher" is built upon "fizzy" synths and New Wave drums. Nelson describes its production as invoking "the crisp, fussed architecture of a Scritti Politti song", whereas Esther Zuckerman of The A.V. Club likened it to a Robyn outtake.

"The One" is described as "bouncy synthwave-lite", where Jepsen sings about avoiding commitment. "Fever" is placed in the "weird and unstable space just before a breakup", where Jepsen confesses to stealing her boyfriend's bike and riding it to his empty house. Nelson notes that the song is "vacuumed into the throb of a bass drum", alluding to the absence of Jepsen's romantic interest. Entertainment Weekly's Jessica Goodman highlighted "Fever" as standout track, calling it a "devastating karaoke sing-along". "Body Language" is accentuated with 808 drum kicks and handclaps. "Cry" is a mid-tempo ballad sung about an emotionally unavailable boyfriend, recalling the Italo disco genre. The song utilizes a synth bass that is "just muted enough to invert its usual effect, generating a feeling of weightlessness".

In 2011, Jepsen participated in an anti-smoking campaign for her home province of British Columbia's Healthy Living Alliance coalition known as "Quitters Unite", which featured an unreleased composition that was reworked into "Store". Several critics have noted its "bizarre" nature as a "misleadingly chipper" song about walking out on a relationship, and its carefully sung verses juxtaposed with a "violent waking" of a chorus. Maura Johnston of Rolling Stone described it as a danceable Dear John letter, while New Statesman's Anna Leszkiewicz called it a "satire of deadbeat dad tropes".

== Release ==
Jepsen wished Emotion a "happy [anniversary]" via social media on August 21, 2016, and announced that she had a "present" in the works. She unveiled the EP's cover artwork in the same post. For the week leading up to its release, Jepsen posted a different song teaser each day across several social media platforms. The track listing was revealed on August 24, 2016, through retailer 7digital Canada. A personal note from Jepsen accompanied Side B's release on August 26, 2016, expressing her gratitude and wishing to reciprocate her fans' support.

Side B received a limited physical release on September 9, 2016, with autographed copies, and it arrived on vinyl on December 16, 2016. Though no singles were issued to promote the EP directly, "First Time" had been previously released as a promotional single for Emotion Remixed + and had charted at number 71 on the Billboard Japan Hot 100. On September 13, 2017, Japan received an exclusive reissue of the EP entitled Cut to the Feeling: Emotion Side B + with revised artwork and the only appearance of the single "Cut to the Feeling" on physical CD. "Cut to the Feeling" then peaked at number 13 on the Japan Hot 100, its highest position in the global music market.

== Critical reception ==
Professional ratings
Aggregate scores
| Source | Rating |
|---|---|
| Metacritic | 80/100 |
Review scores
| Source | Rating |
| AllMusic | 4/5 stars |
| Entertainment Weekly | A− |
| Exclaim! | 8/10 |
| Pitchfork | 7.1/10 |
| Sputnikmusic | 4/5 |
| The 405 | 5.5/10 |

At Metacritic, which assigns a normalized rating out of 100 to reviews from mainstream publications, the album received an average score of 80 based on 6 reviews, indicating "generally favorable reviews". Pitchfork gave the EP a score of 7.1—close to its score of 7.4 for Emotion—and reviewer Brad Nelson found it to be more of a "continuation" of its parent album rather than a typical assorted B-sides collection, remarking: "[these] are pop songs, gorgeous and direct, but they are also extremely recursive spaces, blushing compressions of time, small infinities of heartbreak." Nelson commended Jepsen's "talent" for maintaining a "person-to-person intimacy" in songs that still sound "enormous". Jessica Goodman of Entertainment Weekly came to similar conclusions about Jepsen's pop persona and highlighted the EP's tail-end summer release: "Her timing shows she couldn't care less about becoming pop's queen bee again—she'd rather throw the coolest party in town. Side B is that bash: intimate yet inclusive, with an invitation personally delivered by hand."

Writing for Exclaim!, Jill Krajewski quipped: "if the rollout of Emotion was overthinking it, Side B finds Jepsen coming to a sweet realization: Don't think it over." She praised the EP for its high "single potential" and pondered whether the songs "were all blueprints to 'Run Away with Me', first-drafts of a single meant to define the megahit of [Emotion]. And yet, in their raw state, they show Jepsen at her most powerful and unfettered." In a mixed review, The 405's Mark Matousek said that Side B is "most instructive in the ways it illuminates her process. It lets us peek in on the misfits ... and hints at the unsexy labor of music-making." Pitchfork's Nelson shared this sentiment, and both reviewers found the tracks "Body Language" and "Store" to be lacking.

=== Accolades ===
| Year | Publication | Accolade | Rank | Ref. |
|---|---|---|---|---|
| 2016 | Idolator | The 10 Best EPs & Mixtapes of 2016 | 1 | |
| 2016 | MuuMuse | Top 20 Albums of 2016 | 5 | |
| 2016 | Rolling Stone | 20 Best Pop Albums of 2016 | 6 | |
| 2016 | Gorilla vs. Bear | Albums of 2016 | 43 | |
| 2016 | The Skinny | Top 50 Albums of 2016 | 49 | |
| 2016 | Time Out London | The Best Albums of 2016 | 19 | |
| 2016 | Exclaim! | 10 Best EPs of the Year | 2 | |
| 2016 | Pretty Much Amazing | The 60 Best Albums of 2016 | 25 | |
| 2016 | Stereogum | 25 Great EPs from 2016 | —N/a | |
| 2016 | The A.V. Club | Albums of the Year | —N/a | |
| 2016 | Pitchfork | The 20 Best Pop and R&B Albums of 2016 | —N/a | |
| 2016 | Teen Vogue | 15 Best Albums of 2016 | —N/a | |
| 2016 | Entertainment Weekly | The 100 Songs of 2016 – "Body Language" | 31 | |
| 2016 | Spin | The 101 Songs of 2016 – "Fever" | 74 | |
| 2016 | The Fader | The 100 Songs of 2016 – "Store" | 87 | |

== Commercial performance ==
The album debuted at number 55 in Jepsen's home country of Canada and number 74 in Australia. In the United States, the album debuted at number 62 on the Billboard 200, earning 9,000 album-equivalent units in its first week, with 7,262 coming from pure sales. It also debuted at number 26 the same week on the Billboard Top Album Sales chart.

== Track listing ==
| No. | Title | Writer(s) | Producer(s) | Length |
|---|---|---|---|---|
| 1. | "First Time" | Carly Rae Jepsen; Wayne Hector; Rami Yacoub; Carl Falk | Falk; Rami | 3:35 |
| 2. | "Higher" | Claude Kelly; Greg Kurstin | Kurstin | 3:54 |
| 3. | "The One" | Jepsen; Nate Campany; Kyle Shearer | Shearer | 3:23 |
| 4. | "Fever" | Jepsen; Campany; Shearer; Saul Alexander Castillo Vasquez | Shearer | 3:05 |
| 5. | "Body Language" | Jepsen; Devonté Hynes; Tavish Crowe; Tom Barnes; Ben Kohn; Pete Kelleher | TMS | 2:53 |
| 6. | "Cry" | Jepsen; Crowe; Nick Ruth | Ruth | 3:56 |
| 7. | "Store" | Jepsen; Campany; Christopher J Baran; Ben Romans | CJ Baran; Romans | 3:12 |
| 8. | "Roses" | Jepsen; Ryan Stewart | Shearer; Stewart | 3:40 |
| Total length: | | | | 27:38 |

Emotion Side B + 2017 Japan reissue bonus track
| No. | Title | Writer(s) | Producer(s) | Length |
|---|---|---|---|---|
| 1. | "Cut to the Feeling" (from Ballerina) | Jepsen; Simon Wilcox; Nolan Lambroza | Sir Nolan | 3:28 |
| Total length: | | | | 31:06 |

=== Notes ===
- "Cut to the Feeling" samples "Lucky Star", written and performed by Madonna.

== Personnel ==
Credits per the liner notes of Emotion Side B.

- Carly Rae Jepsen – vocals
- Mitch McCarthy – mixing (tracks 3–8)
- Gene Grimaldi – mastering

== Charts ==
| Chart (2016) | Peak position |
|---|---|
| Australian Albums (ARIA) | 74 |
| Canadian Albums (Billboard) | 55 |
| Irish Albums (IRMA) | 89 |
| New Zealand Heatseeker Albums (RMNZ) | 8 |
| UK Albums (Official Charts) | 182 |
| US Billboard 200 | 62 |
| US Top Album Sales (Billboard) | 26 |

== Release history ==
| Country | Date | Format | Label | Ref. |
|---|---|---|---|---|
| United States | August 26, 2016 | Digital download | School Boy; Interscope | |
| United States | September 9, 2016 | CD | School Boy; Interscope | |
| Canada | March 3, 2017 | LP | 604 | |
