= Emotion (Carly Rae Jepsen album) =

- Original standard cover (Note: The cover of the deluxe edition features "E•MO•TION" written in pink with blue lines in the background instead of vice versa. The 2020 digital reissue and versions of the album released in some regions lack any lines, the former using the deluxe cover with a pink border.)

Studio album by Carly Rae Jepsen
- Released: June 24, 2015
- Recorded: 2013–2015
- Studios: Conway; Echo; Templebase; Veniee Way (Los Angeles); Heavy Duty (Burbank); Kinglet; MXM; Wolf Cousins; PS (Stockholm); Lounge (New York); Monarch (Vancouver); No Excuses (Santa Monica); Paramount; Record Plant; United Recording (Hollywood)
- Genres: Pop; dance-pop; synth-pop; disco
- Length: 44:02
- Labels: 604; School Boy; Interscope
- Producers: Ariel Rechtshaid; Ben Romans; Carl Falk; Christopher J Baran; Dan Nigro; Dev Hynes; Greg Kurstin; Greg Wells; The High Street; Jeff Halatrax; Kyle Shearer; LULOU; Mattman & Robin; Peter Svensson; Rami Yacoub; Rostam Batmanglij; Shellback; Stint; Stargate; Wouter Janssen; Zachary Gray

Carly Rae Jepsen chronology
Kiss: The Remix (2013)	Emotion (2015)	Emotion Remixed + (2016)

Singles from Emotion
- 1. "I Really Like You" Released: March 2, 2015; 2. "All That" Released: April 5, 2015; 3. "Emotion" Released: June 2, 2015; 4. "Run Away With Me" Released: July 17, 2015; 5. "Warm Blood" Released: July 31, 2015; 6. "Making the Most of the Night" Released: August 7, 2015; 7. "Your Type" Released: August 14, 2015; 8. "Boy Problems" Released: April 8, 2016

Singles from Emotion (10th Anniversary Edition)
- 1. "More" Released: March 2, 2026

Emotion (stylized as E•MO•TION) is the third studio album by Canadian singer and songwriter Carly Rae Jepsen. It was initially released on June 24, 2015, in Japan, and later was released internationally on August 21. Looking to transition from the bubblegum pop-oriented nature of her second studio album, Kiss (2012), Jepsen found inspiration in 1980s music and alternative styles. She enlisted a team of mainstream and indie collaborators, including Sia, Mattman & Robin, Dev Hynes, Ariel Rechtshaid, Rostam Batmanglij, Greg Kurstin, and Peter Svensson of the Cardigans, culminating in a largely synth-pop-centric effort.

Emotion received favourable reviews from music critics, who praised its pop escapism. The album debuted at number sixteen on the US Billboard 200 with 16,153 units. In Canada, it became her third top ten, peaking at number eight in Canada with 2,600 copies. The album fared better in Japan, debuting at number eight with 12,189 physical copies sold and subsequently being certified Gold by RIAJ for shipments exceeding 100,000 copies.

The album was preceded by the release of its lead single, "I Really Like You", which reached top five in several territories including the United Kingdom and Japan. It was followed by "All That", the title track "Emotion", "Run Away with Me", "Warm Blood" and "Making the Most of the Night". Following the albums release, "Your Type" and "Boy Problems" were released as the final singles. Jepsen embarked on the Gimmie Love Tour in support of the album in November 2015, with a second leg commencing in February 2016. In April 2016, she toured Canada in support of the album as the opening act for Hedley on their Hello World Tour.

Emotion reinvigorated Jepsen's career as an "indie darling", garnering her a cult following. In 2025, Rolling Stone and Paste ranked it among "The 250 Greatest Albums of the 21st Century So Far" at number 112 and 58, respectively. The album was shortlisted for the 2016 Polaris Music Prize. A companion extended play (EP) entitled Emotion: Side B (2016) was released on its first anniversary, featuring eight songs that were cut from the original project. To celebrate the album's tenth anniversary, it was re-released on October 17, 2025, and contains four additional songs not included on the initial release.

== Background ==
Following the sudden worldwide success of "Call Me Maybe" in 2012, Jepsen found that it had become "[this] huge, ginormous thing that really overshadowed the rest of our project" and further singles issued from Kiss failed to gain traction. Jepsen viewed her predicament as an opportunity to withdraw from the spotlight and contemplate the direction of her next album. She met with her record label and management after the Summer Kiss Tour wrapped up in late 2013, stating: "'I want you to put your faith in me that I'll come back when it's ready,' and they did and I'm very lucky to have a team that wasn't about trying to mass-produce things and was really more looking at the quality of it."

While determining her next direction, Jepsen looked for a "detour" which turned out to be a role on Broadway. "I thought, how amazing would it be to take a left turn, somehow, and still come back to this? [...] but 'left turn'—I didn't know what that meant." She was approached by the producers of Rodgers + Hammerstein's Cinderella to audition for the titular character, and was formally offered the part after auditioning in Los Angeles and passing callbacks in New York. Jepsen assumed the role for twelve weeks from February to June 2014, and during this time handled her own A&R. With help from guitarist Tavish Crowe, Jepsen began reaching out to artists she admired to see if they were interested in collaborating, including Tegan and Sara, Rostam Batmanglij of Vampire Weekend and Shellback.

"[Emotion] had to not be about trying to prove something. I feel like if you're writing music just to have a different identity in the public's eye, it's sort of the wrong motive. It's gotta be coming from a place of what you love and what you're passionate about."

Under pressure to match the success of "Call Me Maybe", Jepsen recorded an entire indie-folk album during her run on Cinderella as an act of "rebellion". Feeling that the demo project was developed for the wrong reasons, Jepsen ultimately scrapped it: "I think there is a natural rebellion when you have success in one area to completely rebel against that. I needed to get that out of my system, I think. I made really weird music." Jepsen's work on Cinderella provided valuable perspective in terms of being defined by a single attribute, particularly from her costar Fran Drescher: "Everyone still calls her 'the Nanny'. I realized you can't give in to other people's perception of you. Everyone's gonna be known for something."

== Writing and development ==
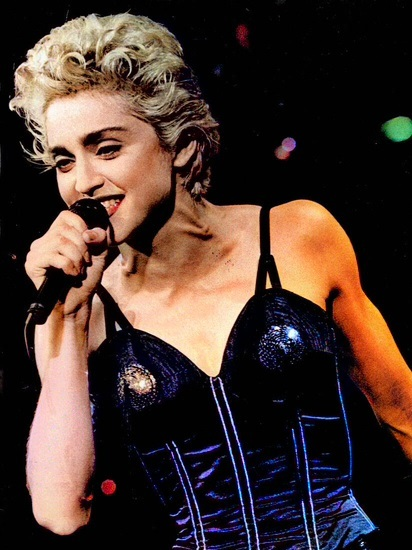
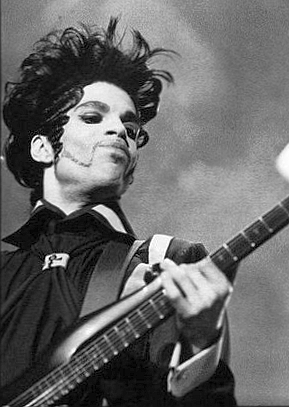
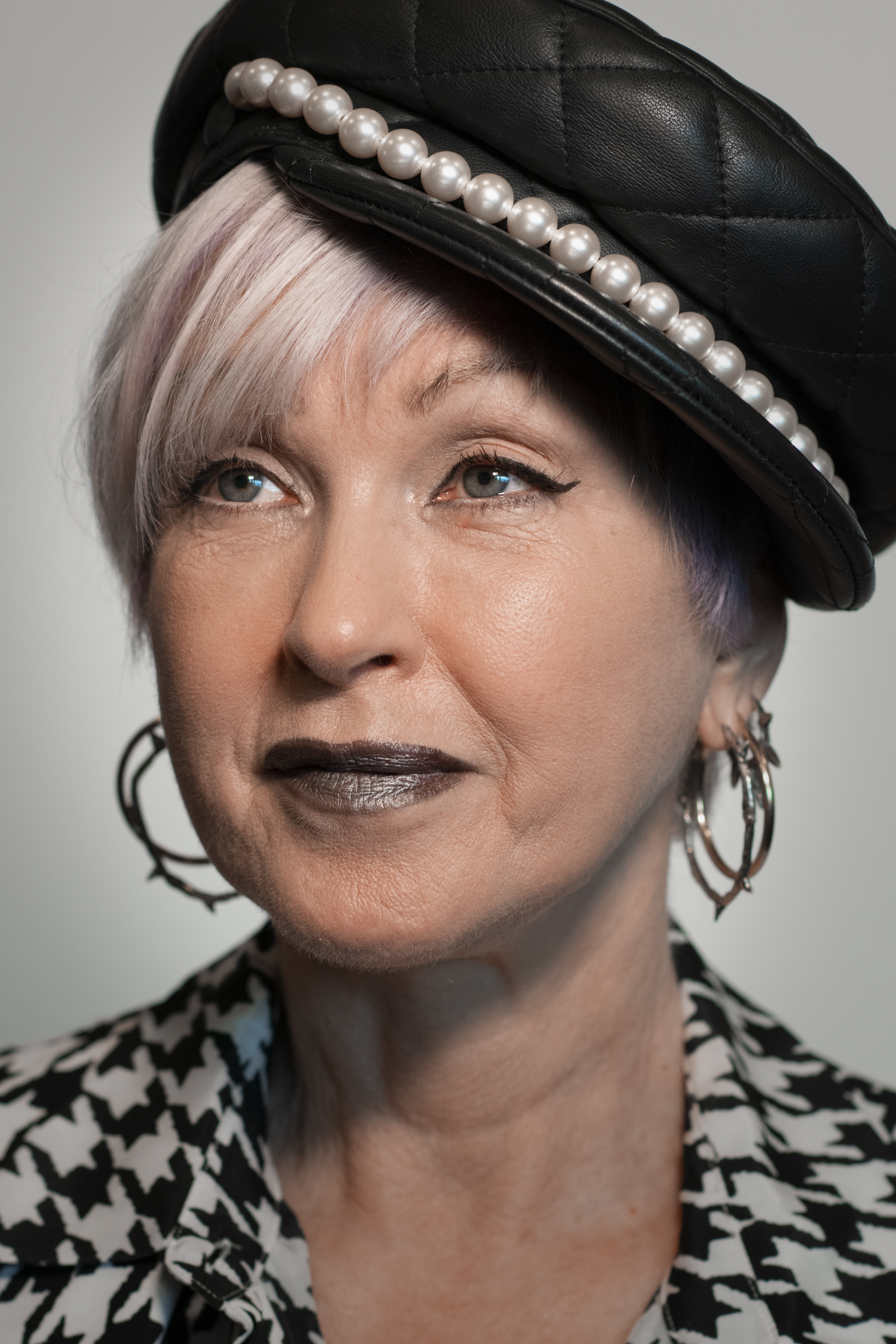
Madonna, Prince and Cyndi Lauper were cited as major influences on the creation of Emotion.

Due to Jepsen's dissatisfaction with her previous album Kiss's constrained timeframe of two months, Jepsen went into Emotion with the intent of crafting a project that was authentic and allowed her to approach different avenues. Whereas Kiss was developed in an acquiescent manner, as Jepsen was simply grateful for the opportunity, Emotion was spurred by her desire to take more creative control. Jepsen commented that much of the album is about "trying to get some power back" after exiting a relationship and subsequently settling down in New York. She sought to channel a "heart-on-your-sleeve sensibility" reminiscent of 1980s pop music after attending a Cyndi Lauper concert in Japan. These themes were further explored through "old-school" Prince and Madonna records on morning runs before Cinderella rehearsals: "What I loved was how potent some of those [1980s] lyrics were—how heart wrenching, how everyone's tea leaves are just right there on their sleeve. In music today, everything is a little more coy, but I wanted that romance and that fantasy, and I think that a lot of people [my] age do."

"[1980s music] was kind of an escape from reality. There's a bit of fantasy on the album in that we've heightened everything–heightened the love and heightened the drama. [...] I would tell the people I worked with, 'I want that feeling, that yearning, that uhhhhh.' And they were like, 'OK, you grunted. I think we get it.'"

An epiphany came to Jepsen after finishing "Emotion", the album's title track, where she found that a 1980s pop sound, combined with a more "alternative" production, was what she had been seeking. This fashioned the album's direction entirely–Emotion developed as a midway point between the "pure" pop she recorded in Los Angeles and the indie-folk effort that was scrapped in New York.

=== Recording ===
Jepsen combed through Dev Hynes's discography after becoming infatuated with "Losing You" by Solange, to which she found his name listed in its production credits. Jepsen sought to collaborate, stating she was a fan, which Hynes hesitated to believe. At a series of studio sessions in New York, Jepsen's vocal ability and work ethic ultimately won Hynes over, and Hynes credited her with genuine intentions of "[developing] a new aesthetic". The pair worked in a Chelsea studio between Jepsen's Cinderella performances. Hynes sent a demo of what would become "All That", where Jepsen wrote the bridge and produced the vocals herself. Ariel Rechtshaid was brought in for additional work on the song. Rechtshaid further contributed to Emotion by aiding in the selection process of its track list and finalising the production on its closer, "When I Needed You".

American musician Rostam Batmanglij was a prior fan of Jepsen's work when he reached out to her in the summer of 2014, after learning that she was in Los Angeles writing with various people. They developed "Warm Blood" over the next year, the first verse recorded as Jepsen sat on the carpet of Batmanglij's home studio. Batmanglij announced the track's existence via Twitter on April 29, 2015.

Per her label's suggestion, Jepsen spent a month in Sweden recording for the album. These sessions materialised in its lead single, "I Really Like You", written with Peter Svensson of the Cardigans; "Your Type" with Rami Yacoub and Carl Falk; and the Mattman & Robin-produced "Run Away with Me" which developed over two separate trips to the country. The duo flew to Los Angeles for one last session with Jepsen, finishing "Gimmie Love" in a day.

Prior to starting full-fledged work on Emotion, Jepsen had sketched several of its demos on her tour bus as she supported Kiss back in 2013. Of these, "Boy Problems" would later be completed with Sia and Greg Kurstin. Sia wrote the bridge to "Boy Problems" and contributed the externally written song "Making the Most of the Night", which she originally developed with the members of Haim. "I Didn't Just Come Here to Dance" existed as early as 2011, based on lyrics Jepsen posted on Twitter that year. It was later presented to Swedish producer Max Martin after the pair finished work on "Tonight I'm Getting Over You" in 2012; intending to cease their session at midnight, the song compelled Martin to stay for two extra hours. Jepsen had also worked with various producers like Josh Ramsay, Ryan Stewart, Benny Blanco and Stargate, though none of these producers appeared on the finalised project. A total of 250 songs were composed over the course of the album's development. Speaking to The Herald, Jepsen stated that she worked on Emotion past deadline and completed the album shortly before its Japanese release on June 24, 2015.

== Composition ==
Emotion is a pop, dance-pop, synth-pop, and disco album that contains elements of new wave. Consequence summed the record up as a "more mature, sophisticated version of her [Kiss] hyperpop", Jepsen elaborating: "I wanted to kind of blur the lines of what [a pop album] needed to be." She found it a challenge to repurpose the album's 1980s influences into a modern context without delving into "empty nostalgia", stating that the album is not strictly a "period piece", but is "tinted with shades of that era". The lyrics on Emotion "shade her old ebullience with darker, more complex feelings", and it is sonically grounded with "earthier textures" from 80s R&B–cleansing herself of the Cinderella performances during the record's production. Elsewhere, Jepsen explores funk and disco on "Boy Problems", and house music on "I Didn't Just Come Here to Dance".

Jepsen singled "All That" out as most representative of the goals she sought to accomplish with Emotion. Lyrically: "['All That'] holds a special place in my heart because it is so revealing: It's talking about the desire for intimacy with somebody. And I think with songs like 'Call Me Maybe', that can be quite light and a little bit more surfacey, it's fun to get a little deeper." Jepsen penned "Your Type" with Rami Yacoub and Carl Falk at four in the morning when she was "losing her mind": "They got me hooked for a week on those little fake cigarettes that taste of strawberries. You can hear it in my voice, I sound all gritty. It's because I was vaping for a week."

The 1980s-influenced dance song "Warm Blood" was produced by Rostam Batmanglij and co-written with Tino Zolfo and Joe Cruz. It initially held the hook "warm love feels good" to which Batmanglij misheard as "warm blood", sticking as its main motif as he was drawn to its physical rather than abstract connotations. Jepsen explained: "The more we chipped away at it, we couldn't get away from how much better 'blood' felt and how realer it was. It's almost like that warm skin or that feeling of intimacy." The song has been noted for its experimental vocal effects, with Batmanglij scattering distorted vocal cuts throughout, a "creepy" quality that the pair immediately liked. Elsewhere, sections of "Warm Blood" were sung in a lower pitch; Jepsen was to re-record these parts as she came to the session with "shot vocals", however its "smokier" quality abandoned these plans. Brad Nelson of The Guardian compared Jepsen's performance to that of Ezra Koenig's "machine-produced flexibility" on the Vampire Weekend song, "Diane Young".

In a session with Tavish Crowe, the closer "When I Needed You" was written to process a break up where Jepsen realises the faults of her seemingly "perfect" relationship: "[...] but in order to stay in it, I would have to be quite a different person than who I naturally am [...] and that sacrifice didn't seem worth it in the end." Dan Nigro and Nate Campany composed the "happier-sounding" instrumental, to which Jepsen felt a sense of catharsis in concealing a "very serious" emotion. Ariel Rechsthaid reworked the chord progression in order to invoke a sense of "desperation", droning through it with a series of bell notes that made the composition sound "a little bit more somber". The "five-string, funk-R&B" bass line was played by Ethan Farmer, and the drum fill, "an 80s kind-of snare with a big reverb on it," was inspired by John Mellencamp's "Jack & Diane".

"Cut to the Feeling" and "Runaways", both written by Jepsen during sessions for Emotion, were recorded for the soundtrack of the 2016 film Ballerina. "Wildflowers", a song written during the sessions for Emotion which leaked online in 2016, was covered by Elle Fanning for the soundtrack of the film Teen Spirit (2018).

== Title and artwork ==
Eternal Summer was a running contender for the album's title, in reference to Los Angeles being an "eternal summer in sunshine" where time perspective is lost. It originated from the song "Eternal Summer" which Jepsen developed for a scrapped indie-folk effort; the song was ultimately cut from Emotion as well. Per suggestion from her A&R, the song "Emotion" was retrofitted as the album's title as Jepsen was fond of its strength, both as a one-word title and its complexity as a concept. Jepsen further stated that the song "Emotion" itself encapsulated her feelings of clarity, as its writing process steered her in the direction of "'80s emotional pop". Jepsen was "sold" on the title Emotion after she was sent its phonetic spelling, which is reflected in its stylization (E·MO·TION).

The album's artwork features Jepsen sitting in a reserved position as she dons a technicolor sweater and black tights: "There were a few different pictures that had more of a decided facial expression, but I kind of liked the fact that I can't totally read what I was thinking in that picture. It could be many things, and this album, to me, was sort of a collection of many different emotions." The artwork's typography bears the dictionary entry of "Emotion" as a noun.

== Release and promotion ==
=== Marketing ===
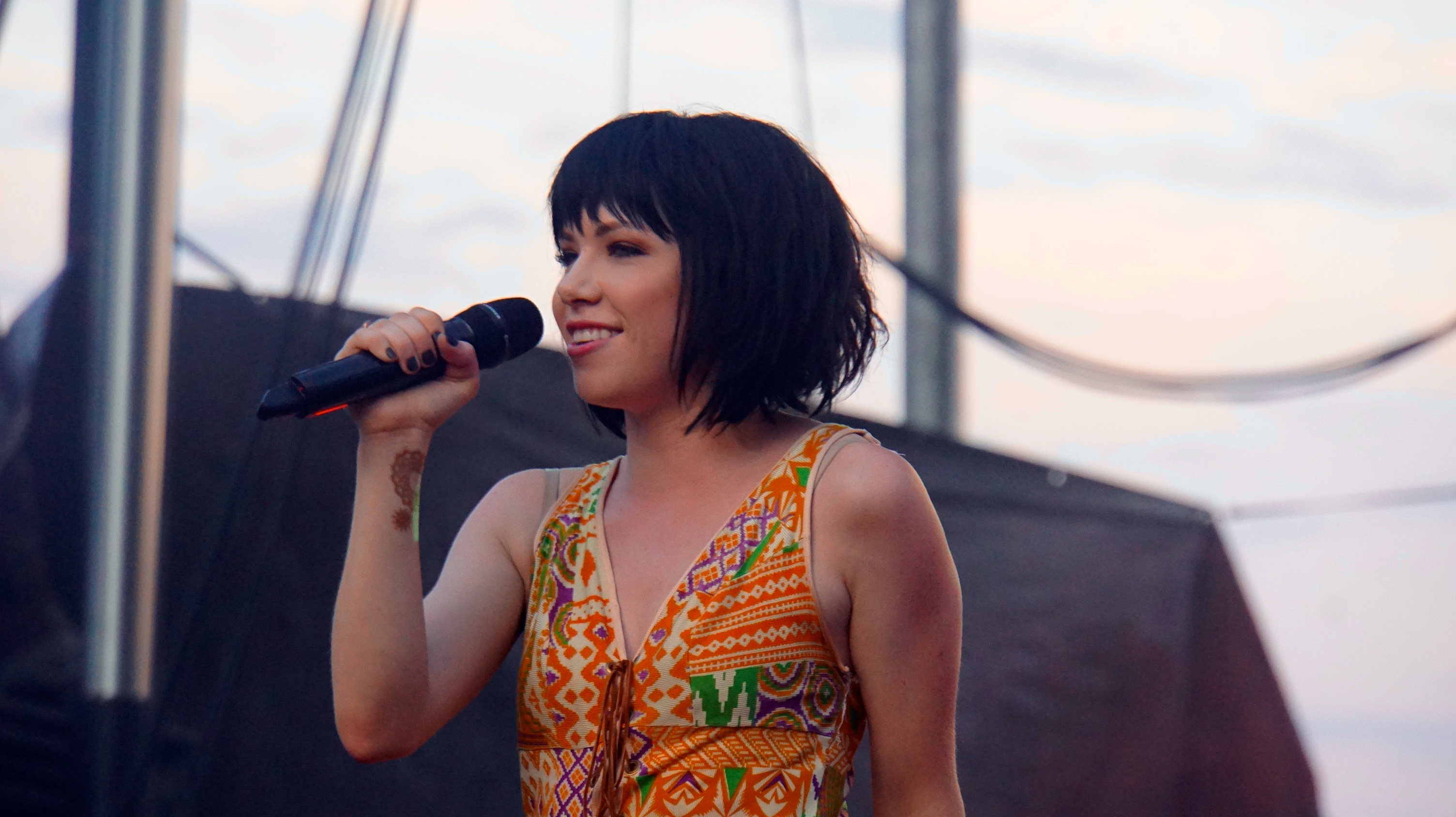
Jepsen at Capital Pride in 2015, where she performed several songs from Emotion

Jepsen did a live performance of "I Really Like You" at Good Morning America on March 2, 2015, the second single "All That" was debuted on Saturday Night Live on April 5. She then announced the title of Emotion on April 11 and released its cover art four days later. In May, Jepsen performed "Run Away with Me", "Emotion", and "Black Heart" in Beijing, China. Emotion's track listing was unveiled on June 2, and its title track was released a day later. The title track premiered on Hit FM in Spain on June 22, and "Run Away with Me" and "Your Type" also premiered on a Spanish radio station on the same day. On July 17 and August 21, Jepsen performed "Run Away with Me" on The Today Show.

Emotion was released on June 24 in Japan, accompanied by a deluxe edition that features three bonus tracks. The Target deluxe contains two additional bonus tracks with the Japanese edition featuring a remix of "I Really Like You", alongside a bonus DVD. Emotion: Side B, an accompanying extended play (EP), was released for an anniversary of Emotion; it includes eight new tracks. On August 20, 2025, a tenth anniversary reissue of the album was announced for release on October 17. It includes "Cut to the Feeling", which Jepsen released in 2017 to promote the film Leap! (2017) as well as four unreleased tracks and two new remixes.

=== Singles ===
Emotion's lead single, "I Really Like You", was released to iTunes Store on March 2, 2015. It reached the top 40 in Australia, Canada, Japan, and Netherlands, and has reached number 39 on the US Billboard Hot 100, number 3 in Ireland and on the UK Singles Chart, and number 1 on the Scottish Singles Chart. Its music video was released on March 6, featuring Tom Hanks and Justin Bieber.

After the success of the lead single, "All That" was released as the second single from the album on April 5 and "Emotion" followed up on June 2. Rolling Stone reported that "Run Away with Me" would serve as the next single, released on July 17. The accompanying music video was released on the same day; it was directed by Jepsen's former boyfriend, David Kalani Larkins and filmed in Tokyo, New York City, and Paris. "Warm Blood" was released as the fifth single from the record on July 31 and was immediately followed by "Making the Most of the Night" a week later. "Your Type" was released on August 14, serving as the seventh single and the last single before Emotion was internationally released. A remix package for "Your Type" was released on December 11 in Europe and Oceania, it had a North American release in the following week. "Your Type" received a music video directed by Gia Coppola which was released on November 3 and followed Jepsen starring in a Cinderella-inspired story.

"Boy Problems" was released as the eighth and final single on April 8, 2016, alongside a music video directed by Petra Collins that stars Tavi Gevinson, Barbie Ferreira, and Paloma Elsesser amongst others. For the 10th Anniversary Edition released in 2025, "More" and "Guardian Angel" were released as promotional singles, the first of which would later be serviced to radio as a single on March 2, 2026.

=== Touring ===
Jepsen was originally set to perform the Gimmie Love Tour on August 12, 2015, at the Smart Araneta Coliseum in Manila. However, due to the effect of 2015 Typhoon Soudelor, she postponed it to September 14. In December, Jepsen announced additional tour dates in the United States which began on February 12, 2016, at the Ritz Raleigh, and concluded at March 26 at the Paramount Huntington. Reviewing the tour, Eve Barlow of Billboard wrote that Jepsen performed as though she were "playing to a stadium-sized audience" and concluded that her concert was a "vocally exquisite pop set".

== Critical reception ==
Professional ratings
Aggregate scores
Source	Rating
AnyDecentMusic?	7.3/10
Metacritic	77/100
Review scores
Source	Rating
AllMusic	5/5 stars
The A.V. Club	B+
Consequence	B+
Entertainment Weekly	A−
The Guardian	3/5 stars
NME	7/10
Pitchfork	7.4/10 (2015); 8.4/10 (2025)
Rolling Stone	3.5/5 stars
Slant Magazine	4/5 stars
Spin	7/10

Emotion received positive reviews from music critics. At Metacritic, which assigns a normalised rating out of 100 to reviews from mainstream publications, the album received an average score of 77, based on 24 reviews.

Emotion was praised for its "pop perfection" in catchiness, cohesion and production value. Sasha Geffen of Consequence wrote, "Few artists have taken a logarithmic hit like "Call Me Maybe" as a sign to push even further, to make something better, more human, and more electric. But Jepsen is the kind of singer who thrives on the stakes that unapologetic pop music offers." Annie Zaleski of The A.V. Club said, "If there's any justice, Emotion will propel her to superstardom—but even if it doesn't, she can at least rest easy knowing she made one of 2015's most interesting, effervescent records." Slant Magazine's James Rainis wrote: "Emotion is further proof that Jepsen is capable of translating broadly understood emotions and experiences into unshakable earworms."

Opinion was divided over the album's lyrical content, which some reviewers have deemed as immature or bland. Corban Goble of Pitchfork commented, "It's unfair to deeply scrutinize lyrics on a pop record—the goal is to write smart, but skew broad—but Emotion fails to tell us who Jepsen is or wants to be." Her "absence of an identity" was further compared to her contemporaries for their image-conscious work. While Adam Downer of cokemachineglow opines that the album's "retro-pop bliss without angle or ego lends it a refreshingly timeless quality", further contexualising it [in] "a year where pop stars fight for brand supremacy"; Alexis Petridis of The Guardian states that the issue was not Jepsen being without an "outrageous, headline-grabbing persona" like Rihanna or Miley Cyrus but that "she doesn't do anything to stamp her identity on the songs [...] It's one problem that all the expensive names in the credits can't solve." Similarly, Jon Caramanica of The New York Times scrutinises the heavy-lifting done by Emotion's cast of collaborators: "Maybe Ms. Jepsen's choices merely reinforce the new centrist pop model of '80s sleekness [...]; but why fall under the spell of someone else's cool when you can luxuriate in the stink of your own cheese?"

In a more negative review, Billy Hamilton of Under the Radar criticized the poptimism narrative surrounding Jepsen and her perceived effort to appease "indie tastemakers", regarding her as "the pet project of a creative hipsterati that's determined to prove pop is cooler than you, or I, could possibly ever imagine," further expressing that "Carly Rae Jepsen and her production team try overly hard to be clever." In a similar conclusion, Evan Sawdey of PopMatters wrote that "Emotion is still a very pleasing album if not just a shade overambitious, clearly trying too hard to make the same genius pop moments that Kiss churned them out with effortless flair."

=== Year-end lists ===
Rolling Stone and Paste listed Emotion among the 250 Greatest Albums of the 21st Century So Far.

Critic/Publication	List	Rank	Ref.
Cosmopolitan	The 15 Best Albums of 2015	1	
Stereogum	The 50 Best Albums of 2015	3	
Time	Top 10 Best Albums	4	
Rolling Stone	20 Best Pop Albums of 2015	7	
Rolling Stone	The 50 Best Albums of 2015	48	
Slant Magazine	The 25 Best Albums of 2015	12	
The Guardian	Best Albums of 2015	19	
Billboard	25 Best Albums of 2015	24	
Consequence	The 50 Best Albums of 2015	24	
Pitchfork	The 50 Best Albums of 2015	34	
NME	NME's Albums of the Year 2015	36	
Sputnikmusic	Top 50 Albums of 2015	24	

=== Decade-end lists ===
Critic/Publication	List	Rank	Ref.
Paste Magazine	The 30 Best Pop Albums of the 2010s	1	
Tampa Bay Times	The 10 Best Albums of the 2010s	4	
Cleveland.com	100 Greatest Albums of the 2010s	6	
Stereogum	The 100 Best Albums of The 2010s	9	
Insider	The 15 Best Albums of the Decade, Ranked	14	
Uproxx	All The Best Albums of the 2010s, Ranked	18	
Slant Magazine	The 100 Best Albums of the 2010s	22	
Genius	The Genius Community's 100 Best Albums of the 2010s	30	
Pitchfork	The 200 Best Albums of the 2010s	47	
Billboard	The 100 Greatest Albums of the 2010s	50	
Rolling Stone	The 100 Best Albums of the 2010s	50	

== Commercial performance ==
Emotion debuted within the top 40 in multiple territories, reaching number eight in Canada and Japan, number 16 on the US Billboard 200, and number 21 on the UK Albums Chart. It also entered the top 40 in Australia, Ireland, and New Zealand, while charting in Belgium, Germany, the Netherlands, South Korea, Spain, and Switzerland.

In Canada, Emotion sold 2,600 copies in its first week, as well as 4,150 copies in the United Kingdom. It debuted with 16,153 copies sold in the United States, where it had sold 36,000 copies by the end of 2015. In Japan, Emotion opened with 12,189 physical copies sold in its first week and was certified gold by the Recording Industry Association of Japan on April 2, 2016, for shipments exceeding 100,000 copies. The album was also ranked number 55 on Oricon's year-end albums chart for 2015.

== Legacy ==
Emotion is considered a critical turning point in Jepsen's "unlikely" career trajectory, following her stint on Canadian Idol and the ubiquity of "Call Me Maybe" to "cult idol". Marked as a transitional piece, publications commended Jepsen for cultivating her sound, which "[reestablished] herself as a pop star for grown-ups". Carrie Battan of the New Yorker posed that Emotion spared Jepsen from "falling to her death" and instead descended her to the bottom akin to a rising "mindie" artist, online buzz and "underground cred" in tow: "Jepsen, the woman behind one of the biggest songs of this century, now resembles someone whom she never had the opportunity to become at the beginning: an indie darling."

James Rettig of Stereogum wrote: "The lead-up to Emotion played out like a lesson in what not to do with a pop singer sitting precariously on the edge between cultural ubiquity and cult following." Some blamed its promotional roll-out, with a Japanese release arriving two months ahead and therefore susceptible to leaks. Elsewhere, others focused on creative choices–Rettig criticised "I Really Like You" as a lead single, the "most damaging misstep" that hindered Jepsen's ability to showcase her artistic growth.

The record grew to become a cult hit with Jepsen labelled as an "underdog" as it spread by word-of-mouth. Music critics were "compelled by the narrative of a one-hit wonder trying to rebuild herself", as Battan wrote. Emotion is noted for garnering Jepsen a large LGBTQ audience, Brandon Tensley of Pacific Standard opining that her music "taps into a shared queer history of escape, possibility, and disappointment", likening her to Kylie Minogue.

NPR's Lyndsey McKenna called Emotion a "modern touchstone" in 2018, by which they compared the Aces and Paramore's After Laughter (2017) to. In developing her EP Now That the Light Is Fading, Maggie Rogers resolved to make pop music after being inspired by Emotion. Jay Som counted Jepsen as an influence on her debut studio album, Everybody Works, stating: "I felt very assertive with [Everybody Works] because I was also listening to her music. I liked how energetic and youthful the spirit is—and it's just so not ashamed to be this pop record." A tribute album by Something Merry was released digitally on November 21, 2018; it is a track-by-track cover of Emotion, including covers made by Wild Pink, Cheer Up, Future Teens, Gabe Goodman, Good Looking Friends, Kiki Maddog, Lilith, Mandancing, oldsoul, Photocomfort, Pushflowers, the Aux, the Superweaks, Tuft.

== Track listing ==
Standard edition
No.	Title	Writer(s)	Producer(s)	Length
1.	"Run Away with Me"	Carly Rae Jepsen; Jonnali Parmenius; Mattias Larsson; Robin Fredriksson; Shellback; Oscar Holter	Mattman & Robin; Shellback; Tim Blacksmith; Danny D.	4:11
2.	"Emotion"	Jepsen; Nate Campany; Ben Romans; Christopher J Baran	CJ Baran; Romans	3:17
3.	"I Really Like You"	Jepsen; J Kash; Peter Svensson	Svensson; Jeff Halatrax	3:24
4.	"Gimmie Love"	Jepsen; Larsson; Fredriksson	Mattman & Robin	3:22
5.	"All That"	Jepsen; Devonté Hynes; Ariel Rechtshaid	Rechtshaid; Hynes	4:38
6.	"Boy Problems"	Jepsen; Sia Furler; Tavish Crowe; Greg Kurstin	Kurstin	3:42
7.	"Making the Most of the Night"	Jepsen; Furler; Samuel Dixon; Emre Ramazanoglu; Danielle Haim; Alana Haim; Este Haim^{[a]}	The High Street	3:58
8.	"Your Type"	Jepsen; Crowe; Wayne Hector; Rami Yacoub; Carl Falk	Falk; Yacoub	3:19
9.	"Let's Get Lost"	Jepsen; Baran; Romans	Baran; Romans	3:13
10.	"LA Hallucinations"	Jepsen; Zachary Gray; Ajay Bhattacharyya	Stint; Gray	3:04
11.	"Warm Blood"	Jepsen; Tino Zolfo; Joe Cruz; Rostam Batmanglij	Batmanglij	4:13
12.	"When I Needed You"	Jepsen; Nate Campany; Crowe; Rechtshaid; Daniel Nigro	Rechtshaid; Nigro^{[b]}	3:41
Total length:				44:02

Deluxe edition
No.	Title	Writer(s)	Producer(s)	Length
13.	"Black Heart"	Jepsen; E. Kidd Bogart; Greg Wells	Wells	2:56
14.	"I Didn't Just Come Here to Dance"	Jepsen; Zolfo; Cruz; LULOU; Wouter Janssen	LULOU; Wouter Janssen	3:39
15.	"Favourite Colour"	Jepsen; Crowe; Larsson; Fredriksson	Mattman & Robin	3:29
Total length:				54:06

Target and 2020 digital expanded edition
No.	Title	Writer(s)	Producer(s)	Length
16.	"Never Get to Hold You"	Jepsen; Campany; Crowe; Kyle Shearer	Shearer	4:13
17.	"Love Again"	Jepsen; Campany; Crowe; Baran	Baran	3:35
Total length:				61:54

Japanese edition
No.	Title	Writer(s)	Producer(s)	Length
18.	"I Really Like You" (Liam Keegan Radio Edit)	Jepsen; Kash; Svensson	Svensson; Halatrax; Keegan^{[b]}	3:09
Total length:				65:03

Japanese deluxe edition – bonus DVD
No.	Title	Length
1.	"I Really Like You" (music video)	3:30
2.	"I Really Like You" (behind the scenes)	4:23
3.	"The Making of Emotion" (studio webisode part 1)	0:52
4.	"Emotion – International EPK"	9:23

10th anniversary edition
No.	Title	Writer(s)	Producer(s)	Length
18.	"Cut to the Feeling"	Carly Rae Jepsen; Simon Wilcox; Nolan Lambroza	Sir Nolan	3:27
19.	"More"	Arthur Besnainou; Jepsen; Baran	Baran; Besnainou	3:24
20.	"Guardian Angel"	Jepsen; Cole Marsden Greif-Neill; Connor McDonough; Riley McDonough; Steve Mac	C. McDonough; R. McDonough	2:07
21.	"Back of My Heart"	Jepsen; Jonas Jeberg	Jeberg	2:33
22.	"Lost in Devotion"	Jepsen; Imad Royal; Rogét Chahayed	Royal; Chahayed	3:14
23.	"Run Away with Me" (Kyle Shearer remix)			3:45
24.	"Run Away with Me" (Rostam remix)		Mattman & Robin; Shellback	4:01
Total length:				84:25

=== Notes ===
- ^{^[a]} Although credited as 'The Trinity', the members of the band Haim are the names behind this pseudonym.
- ^{^[b]} signifies an additional producer.

== Personnel ==
Credits were adapted from the liner notes.

=== Music ===
- Noonie Bao – backing vocals (1)
- CJ Baran – all instruments (2, 9, 17)
- Rostam Batmanglij – keyboards, piano (1)
- Ajay Bhattacharyya – synths (10)
- Peter Carlsson – solina (3)
- Samuel Dixon – electric guitar, acoustic guitar, bass guitar, synths (7)
- Carl Falk – instruments, guitars (8)
- Ethan Farmer – bass (5, 12)
- Wojtek Goral – saxophone (1)
- Oscar Görres – backing vocals (1)
- Zachary Gray – bass, synths (10)
- Jeff Halatrax – drums, synths, keyboards, bass (3)
- Svante Halldin – violin (4)
- Oscar Holter – backing vocals (1)
- Devonté Hynes – guitars (5)
- Wouter Janssen – all instruments (14)
- Carly Rae Jepsen – lead vocals, backing vocals (1)
- Jakob Jerlström – backing vocals (1)
- Tommy King – keyboards (12)
- Daniel Farrugia – keyboards, piano (5)
- Greg Kurstin – bass, drums, guitar, keyboards (6)
- Katerina Loules – backing vocals (14)
- Lukas "Lulou" Loules – all instruments (14)
- Roger Joseph Manning Jr. – synthesizers (5)
- Mattman & Robin – backing vocals, bass, drums, percussion (1, 4, 15); guitars (1, 4); vocoder, synths (15)
- Missy Modell – backing vocals (3)
- Daniel Nigro – guitar (12)
- Emre Ramazanoglu – synths, percussion, drums (7)
- Rami – instruments, bass (8)
- Ariel Rechtshaid – synthesizers, percussion (5)
- Sibel Redžep – backing vocals (1)
- Ben Romans – all instruments (2, 9)
- Ludvig Söderberg – backing vocals (1)
- Marlene Strand – backing vocals (8)
- Peter Svensson – drums, synths, keyboards, bass, guitar (3)
- Greg Wells – drums, synths (13)

=== Production ===
- Henrique Andrade – engineering assistance (7)
- CJ Baran – production, programming (2, 9, 17)
- Rostam Batmanglij – production, engineering, drum and synth programming (11)
- Ajay Bhattacharyya – production, recording, drum programming (10)
- Mikaelin 'Blue' Bluespruce – recording (5)
- Mario Borgatta – mixing assistance (10)
- Julian Burg – engineering (6)
- Martin Cooke – engineering assistance (10)
- Rich Costey – mixing (10)
- Tom Coyne – mastering (1–4, 8)
- John DeBold – engineering assistance (5, 12)
- Samuel Dixon – programming (7)
- Micky Evelyn – engineering assistance (5)
- Eric Eylands – engineering assistance (3)
- Carl Falk – production, programming (8)
- Nicholas Fournier – engineering assistance (10)
- Kyle Gaffney – engineering assistance (14)
- Chris Galland – mixing assistance (6, 12)
- Serban Ghenea – mixing (1–4, 8)
- Zachary Gray – production, recording (10)
- Gene Grimaldi – mastering (6–7, 9–17)
- Josh Gudwin – vocal production, vocal recording (7)
- Jeff Halatrax – production, engineering, programming (3)
- John Hanes – mix engineering (1–4, 8)
- The High Street – production (7)
- Devonté Hynes – production, programming (5)
- Chris Kasych – engineering (11–12)
- Greg Kurstin – production, engineering (6)
- Lukas "Lulou" Loules – production, engineering, mixing (14)
- Eric Madrid – mixing (7, 13, 15)
- Manny Marroquin – mixing (6, 12)
- Mattman & Robin – production (1, 4, 15); programming (1, 15)
- Mitch McCarthy – mixing (16–17)
- Scott Moore – engineering (4)
- Daniel Nigro – additional production, programming (track 12)
- Robert Orton – mixing (5, 11)
- Alex Pasco – engineering (6)
- Noah Passovoy – additional vocal recording (15)
- Emre Ramazanoglu – programming (7)
- Rami – production, programming (8)
- Ariel Rechtshaid – production, programming (5, 12); recording (5); engineering, drum programming (12)
- Ben Romans – production, programming (2, 9)
- Will Sandalls – engineering (16)
- Matt Schaeffer – engineering assistance (14, 16)
- Ike Schultz – mixing assistance (6, 12)
- Wesley Seidman – recording (5)
- Kyle Shearer – production (16)
- Shellback – production (1)
- Laura Sisk – additional engineering (12)
- Stint – production (10)
- Shane Stoneback – engineering (11)
- Peter Svensson – production, engineering, programming (3)
- Juan Carlos Torrado – engineering assistance (3, 17)
- Randy Urbanski – engineering (4)
- Jaime Velez – engineering assistance (3)
- Robert Vosgien – mastering (5)
- Vincent Vu – mixing assistance (7, 13, 15)
- Greg Wells – production, programming (13)
- Wired Masters – mastering (14)

=== Business ===
- Scott "Scooter" Braun – executive production, A&R, management
- Greg Carr – marketing coordination
- Lisa DiAngelo – publicity
- John Ehmann – A&R
- David Gray – A&R
- Pamela Gurley – legal representation
- Brad Haugen – marketing, creative direction
- Laura Hess – management, marketing
- Dyana Kass – marketing
- Allison Kaye – management
- Steve Kopec – management
- Evan Lamberg – A&R
- Kenny Meiselas – legal representation
- Katherine Neiss – A&R coordination
- Olivia Zaro – A&R

=== Packaging ===
- Jessica Severn – art direction and design
- Karla Welch – styling
- Matthew Welch – photography

== Charts ==
=== Weekly charts ===
Weekly chart performance
Chart (2015)	Peak position
Australian Albums (ARIA)	37
Belgian Albums (Ultratop Flanders)	59
Belgian Albums (Ultratop Wallonia)	54
Canadian Albums (Billboard)	8
Dutch Albums (Album Top 100)	68
German Albums (Offizielle Top 100)	73
Irish Albums (IRMA)	29
Japanese Albums (Oricon)	8
New Zealand Albums (Recorded Music NZ)	35
South Korean Albums (Gaon)	65
Spanish Albums (Promusicae)	45
Swiss Albums (Schweizer Hitparade)	93
UK Albums (Official Charts)	21
US Billboard 200	16
US Indie Store Album Sales (Billboard)	3

=== Year-end charts ===
Year-end chart performance
Chart (2015)	Position
Japanese Albums (Oricon)	55

== Certifications ==
Certifications and sales
Region	Certification	Certified units/sales
Japan (RIAJ)	Gold	100,000^{^}
United Kingdom	—	6,000
United States	—	36,000
^{^} Shipments figures based on certification alone.

== Release history ==
Release dates and formats
Region	Date	Edition	Format	Label	Ref.
Japan	June 24, 2015	Standard; deluxe	CD; digital download; LP	604; School Boy; Interscope; Universal	
Various	August 21, 2015	Standard; deluxe	CD; digital download; LP	604; School Boy; Interscope; Universal	
United States	August 21, 2015	Standard; deluxe; Target	CD; LP	604; School Boy; Interscope; Universal	
Europe	September 18, 2015	Standard; deluxe	CD; digital download; LP	604; School Boy; Interscope; Universal	
Various	August 21, 2020	Deluxe Expanded	Digital download; streaming	604; School Boy; Interscope; Universal	
