= First Time (Carly Rae Jepsen song) =

Promotional single by Carly Rae Jepsen

from the album Emotion Remixed +
- Released: 18 March 2016
- Recorded: 2015
- Genre: Synth-funk
- Length: 3:35
- Label: 604; School Boy; Interscope
- Songwriters: Carl Falk; Wayne Hector; Carly Rae Jepsen; Rami Yacoub
- Producers: Carl Falk; Rami Yacoub

"First Time" is a song recorded by Canadian singer Carly Rae Jepsen for her second remix album, Emotion Remixed + (2016), which was released only in Japan. The song is also included on Emotion: Side B. Its lyric video was uploaded to YouTube on 23 March 2016 and can only be watched in Japan.

== Live performances ==
On April 2, 2016, Jepsen performed this song in the Japanese music festival "Popspring 2016" for the first time.

== Chart performance ==
"First Time" peaked on the Billboard Japan Hot 100 Chart at No. 71 and became her fifth highest ranked song on the chart, behind "Call Me Maybe", "I Really Like You", "Good Time" and "This Kiss". It also peaked on the Billboard Japan Hot Overseas at No. 8 and Billboard Japan Radio Songs Chart at No. 9.

== Charts ==
Chart (2016)	Peak position
Japan Hot 100 (Billboard)	71
