= Cut to the Feeling =

2017 single by Carly Rae Jepsen

Single by Carly Rae Jepsen
- Released: May 26, 2017
- Recorded: 2015
- Genre: Power pop; synth-pop
- Length: 3:27
- Label: 604; School Boy; Interscope; Lakeshore
- Songwriters: Carly Rae Jepsen; Simon Wilcox; Nolan Lambroza
- Producer: Sir Nolan

Carly Rae Jepsen singles chronology
"Boy Problems" (2016)	"Cut to the Feeling" (2017)	"Party for One" (2018)

Music video
- "Cut to the Feeling" on YouTube

"Cut to the Feeling" is a song recorded by Canadian singer and songwriter Carly Rae Jepsen, from the 2016 Canadian-French animated film Ballerina (titled Leap! in the United States). Written by Jepsen, Simon Wilcox, and Nolan Lambroza, and produced by Lambroza, it was released as a single to promote the film on May 26, 2017. The song was later included on Emotion: Side B+, a Japan reissue of Jepsen's 2016 EP Emotion: Side B, as well as the tenth anniversary edition of her third studio album Emotion (2015). It also serves as the theme song for the MTV reality series Siesta Key.

Billboard, The Guardian, Pitchfork, Rolling Stone and Vanity Fair named it one of the best songs of 2017 in their respective year-end lists. Commercially, the single was successful in Hungary and Japan where it charted at numbers 23 and 13. It also received gold certifications in Japan and New Zealand.

== Background and release ==
"Cut to the Feeling" was written during the creation of Jepsen's third studio album, Emotion (2015), but was not included on the album because it was too "cinematic and theatrical". It was later intended for the album's follow-up EP, Emotion: Side B (2016), but was then slated for release with Ballerina (2016) after Jepsen signed on for the film and felt the song was fitting for the story. The track was one of two songs, along with "Runaways", that Jepsen contributed to the film.

"Cut to the Feeling" was included on the new edition of Emotion: Side B, released exclusively in Japan on September 13, 2017, and re-titled Emotion: Side B+. It was also used as the theme song for the MTV reality television show Siesta Key. The song was later included in the tenth anniversary edition of Emotion, released on October 17, 2025.

== Composition ==
"Cut to the Feeling" was originally published in the key of A major in common time with a tempo of 115 beats per minute. Jepsen's vocals span from A_{3} to the high note of F#_{5}. The song begins with a sample of the opening synth note from "Lucky Star" by Madonna.

== Critical reception ==
The song received widespread critical acclaim. J. Lynch of Billboard called the song "flawlessly constructed", adding it is "the closest we'll get to Whitney Houston's late-'80s dancefloor euphoria in 2017". Hayden Manders of Nylon describes "Cut to the Feeling" as a "masterclass" of the "best, sweetest pop music" today, celebrating the "possibility of big love" with a "chorus that blasts off to stars and doesn't let up for the rest of the song's duration". She further describes the song as being like the "butterflies you get before a first date with a crush". It was featured as Pitchfork's "Best New Track", with Laura Snapes describing it as "bombastic and gaudy" while praising it for being "distinctly Jepsen, her coaxing vocal creakiness convincing her paramour to stop denying what they want and just fucking go for it with her".

Rolling Stone wrote Jepsen "saved 2017 with her bracing rejoinder to Xanax-pop malaise", and that her "boisterous vocal [sic] adds extra urgency to this jump-along anthem's much-needed e•mo•tional rescue". Slant Magazine wrote the single is her best since "Call Me Maybe", adding that it "delivers breathless, syncopated vocals over a measured handclap beat before the whole thing erupts into its euphoric hook." Spin praised the song for deemphasizing Emotion's "explicit '80s posing, using that well-worn synth-pop chug for something brighter, bigger, and more bombastic." DJ Louie XIV of Vanity Fair praised Jepsen's directness, as she "cuts straight through the crap...No artifice. No posturing". He described the song as an ecstatic celebration of "diving in headfirst with a new guy (or girl)", providing "the smile we all needed in 2017".

=== Oscar eligibility ===
The song was not written specifically for Ballerina and thus was not eligible for an Academy Award for Best Original Song. "Cut to the Feeling" was cited as one of multiple examples of the Academy Awards' harsh rules.

=== Year-end lists ===
Publication	Year	Accolade	Rank	Ref.
Billboard	2017	50 Best Songs of 2017, So Far	23	
Esquire	2017	50 Best Songs of 2017	—N/a	
The Guardian	2017	The Top 100 Tracks of 2017	—N/a	
The Line of Best Fit	2017	The Best Fifty Songs of 2017 Ranked	44	
Noisey	2017	The 100 Best Songs of 2017	100	
Nylon	2017	The Best Songs Of 2017, So Far	3	
Popjustice	2017	The Top 45 Singles of 2017	2	
PopMatters	2017	The 75 Best Songs Of 2017	64	
Pitchfork	2017	The 100 Best Songs Of 2017	30	
Rolling Stone	2017	50 Best Songs of 2017	44	
Slant Magazine	2017	The 25 Best Singles of 2017	4	
Spin	2017	50 Best Songs of 2017, So Far	1	
Vanity Fair	2017	17 Best Songs of 2017	—N/a	
Variety	2022	Carly Rae Jepsen's 15 Best Songs, Ranked	4	

== Music video ==
The music video for "Cut to the Feeling" was filmed on July 26, 2017, directed by Gia Coppola with whom Jepsen had worked on the "Your Type" video. It begins with behind-the-scenes footage of making this video, which shows the singer and her team getting ready for the shoot. As a clock positioned in the corner counts down from 1 minute and 32 seconds, Jepsen is seen having her make-up applied, posing with her team outdoors, making coffee and playing around the studio. She then arrives at the filming set and the clip launches into the black-and-white performance-style music video, which sees Jepsen's singing the last chorus of the song into a microphone, surrounded by her band. A lyric video for the song was released in June 2017 before the official video premiered on September 15, 2017.

== Live performances ==
At Lollapalooza 2018, fans gave Carly Rae Jepsen an inflatable sword during her performance of the song. This has since become a recurring part of her performances.

== Track listings ==
- Digital download/Streaming
1. "Cut to the Feeling" – 3:27
- Digital download/Streaming (Remix)
1. "Cut to the Feeling" (Kid Froopy Remix) – 3:13

== Charts ==
Chart (2017–18)	Peak position
Canada Digital Songs (Billboard)	33
Hungary (Rádiós Top 40)	23
Japan (Japan Hot 100)	13
Japan Hot Overseas (Billboard)	3
Scottish Singles Sales (Official Charts)	55
UK Singles Downloads (Official Charts)	69
US Dance Club Songs (Billboard)	54
US Digital Songs (Billboard)	42

== Certifications ==
Region	Certification	Certified units/sales
Japan (RIAJ) Digital single	Gold	100,000^{*}
New Zealand (RMNZ)	Gold	15,000^{‡}
United Kingdom (BPI)	Silver	200,000^{‡}
^{*} Sales figures based on certification alone.^{‡} Sales+streaming figures based on certification alone.

== Release history ==
Country	Date	Format	Label
Various	May 26, 2017	Digital download; streaming	Universal Music
