= Gimmie Love Tour =

2015–16 concert tour by Carly Rae Jepsen

- Tour by Carly Rae Jepsen
- Promotional poster for the tour
- Associated album: Emotion
- Start date: 14 September 2015
- End date: 4 April 2016
- Legs: 8
- No. of shows: 8 in Asia; 2 in Africa; 2 in Europe; 39 in North America; 50 total

Carly Rae Jepsen concert chronology
- The Summer Kiss Tour (2013); Gimmie Love Tour (2015–16); The Dedicated Tour (2019–20)

The Gimmie Love Tour was the second concert tour by Canadian singer Carly Rae Jepsen. It was launched in support of her third studio album, Emotion (2015). The November 2015 dates were announced on 28 September 2015 (on sale on 2 October 2015). The February 2016 to March 2016 were announced on 9 December 2015 (on sale on 10 December 2015). The Gimmie Love Tour received positive reviews and was a success. Most dates were sold out.

== Set list ==
The following set list is representative of the concert on 30 December 2015. It is not representative of all concerts for the duration of the tour.

1. "Run Away with Me"
2. "Making the Most of the Night"
3. "Good Time"
4. "Emotion"
5. "Warm Blood"
6. "Boy Problems"
7. "This Kiss"
8. "Gimmie Love"
9. "Tiny Little Bows"
10. "I Didn't Just Come Here to Dance"
11. "Tonight I'm Getting Over You"
12. "Your Type"
13. "When I Needed You"
14. "Love Again"
15. "LA Hallucinations"
16. "Favourite Colour"
17. "All That"
18. "Let's Get Lost"
19. "Curiosity"
20. "Call Me Maybe"
21. "I Really Like You"

Notes

- "Fever" was added to the setlist replacing "Love Again" on March 11.
- "First Time" was added to the setlist replacing "Tiny Little Bows" on March 23.
- ”Everywhere You Look” was performed with Bob Saget on March 11.

== Shows ==
List of concerts, showing date, city, country, venue and opening act
Date	City	Country	Venue	Opening act(s)
Asia
14 September 2015 (Note: The concert of 14 September 2015 at the Smart Araneta Coliseum in Manila was originally scheduled to take place on 12 August 2015, but was rescheduled due to the effect of Typhoon Soudelor (2015).)	Quezon City	Philippines	Smart Araneta Coliseum	Marion Aunor
Africa
21 October 2015	Cape Town	South Africa	Grand Arena, GrandWest	—
24 October 2015	Pretoria	South Africa	Monument Amphitheatre	—
North America
1 November 2015	Ithaca	United States	Barton Hall	—
9 November 2015	Silver Spring	United States	The Fillmore	—
10 November 2015	Boston	United States	The Paradise	—
11 November 2015	New York City	United States	Irving Plaza	—
13 November 2015	Philadelphia	United States	The Trocadero	—
Asia
17 November 2015	Tokyo	Japan	Zepp Diver City	—
18 November 2015	Osaka	Japan	Namba Hatch	—
19 November 2015	Nagoya	Japan	Diamond Hall	—
North America
27 November 2015 (Note: The concert of 27 November 2015 at the Music Plaza Stage in Orlando was part of Universal Orlando's "25th Anniversary Concert Series".)	Orlando	United States	Music Plaza Stage	—
2 December 2015 (Note: The concert of 2 December 2015 at the Fox Tucson Theatre in Tucson was part of 93.7 KRQ's "Christmas in Tucson".)	Tucson	United States	Fox Tucson Theatre	—
Europe
6 December 2015 (Note: The concert of 6 December 2015 at The O2 Arena in London was part of Capital FM's "2015 Jingle Bell Ball".)	London	England	The O_{2} Arena	—
7 December 2015	London	England	Islington Assembly Hall	—
North America
30 December 2015	Las Vegas	United States	Venetian Theatre	—
31 December 2015	Las Vegas	United States	Venetian Theatre	—
2 January 2016	Las Vegas	United States	Venetian Theatre	—
12 February 2016	Raleigh	United States	The Ritz	Cardinox; Fairground Saints
13 February 2016	Charlotte	United States	The Fillmore	Cardinox; Fairground Saints
14 February 2016	Atlanta	United States	Variety Playhouse	Cardinox; Fairground Saints
15 February 2016	Orlando	United States	The Plaza Live	Cardinox; Fairground Saints
17 February 2016	Tampa	United States	The Ritz Ybor	Cardinox; Fairground Saints
19 February 2016	Dallas	United States	House of Blues	Cardinox; Fairground Saints
20 February 2016	Austin	United States	Moody Theater	Cardinox; Fairground Saints
21 February 2016	Houston	United States	House of Blues	Cardinox; Fairground Saints
24 February 2016	Tempe	United States	Marquee Theatre	Cardinox; Fairground Saints
25 February 2016	Los Angeles	United States	Fonda Theatre	Cardinox; Fairground Saints
26 February 2016	Anaheim	United States	City National Grove	Cardinox; Fairground Saints
27 February 2016	San Francisco	United States	Warfield Theatre	Cardinox; Fairground Saints
29 February 2016	Seattle	United States	The Showbox	Cardinox; Fairground Saints
1 March 2016	Portland	United States	Wonder Ballroom	Cardinox; Fairground Saints
2 March 2016	Boise	United States	Knitting Factory Concert House	Cardinox; Fairground Saints
4 March 2016	Salt Lake City	United States	The Depot	Cardinox; Fairground Saints
5 March 2016	Denver	United States	Gothic Theatre	Cardinox; Fairground Saints
7 March 2016	Tulsa	United States	Cain's Ballroom	Cardinox; Fairground Saints
8 March 2016	Lawrence	United States	The Granada	Cardinox; Fairground Saints
9 March 2016	Minneapolis	United States	Varsity Theater	Cardinox; Fairground Saints
11 March 2016	Milwaukee	United States	Turner Hall Ballroom	Cardinox; Fairground Saints
12 March 2016	Chicago	United States	Metro	Cardinox; Fairground Saints
13 March 2016	Detroit	United States	St. Andrews Hall	Cardinox; Fairground Saints
14 March 2016	Nashville	United States	Cannery Ballroom	Cardinox; Fairground Saints
17 March 2016	Covington	United States	Madison Theater	Cardinox; Fairground Saints
18 March 2016	Pittsburgh	United States	Mr. Small's	Cardinox; Fairground Saints
19 March 2016	Norfolk	United States	Norva Theatre	Cardinox; Fairground Saints
20 March 2016	Baltimore	United States	Baltimore Sound Stage	Cardinox; Fairground Saints
22 March 2016	Clifton Park	United States	Upstate Concert Hall	Cardinox; Fairground Saints
23 March 2016	Providence	United States	Fete Ballroom	Cardinox; Fairground Saints
25 March 2016	New York City	United States	Terminal 5	Cardinox; Fairground Saints
26 March 2016	Huntington	United States	The Paramount	Cardiknox
Asia
31 March 2016	Sapporo	Japan	Zepp Sapporo	—
2 April 2016 (Note: The concert of 2 April 2016 at the Makuhari Messe in Chiba is part of "Pop Spring".)	Chiba	Japan	Makuhari Messe	—
3 April 2016 (Note: The concert of 3 April 2016 at the Kobe World Memorial Hall in Kobe is part of "Pop Spring".)	Kobe	Japan	World Memorial Hall	—
4 April 2016	Fukuoka	Japan	Zepp Fukuoka	—

== Box office score data ==
Venue	City	Tickets sold / available	Gross revenue
The Trocadero	Philadelphia	828 / 1,200	$23,805
The Plaza Live	Orlando	654 / 1,067	$11,715
Fonda Theatre	Los Angeles	1,212 / 1,212 (100%)	$33,330
The Paramount	Huntington	964 / 1,573	$27,800
TOTAL (for the 8 concerts listed)		3,658 / 5,052 (72%)	$96,650
