= More (Carly Rae Jepsen song) =

Single by Carly Rae Jepsen

from the album Emotion (10th Anniversary Edition)
- Written: 2013-2015
- Released: March 2, 2026
- Studio: VAMP (Los Angeles)
- Genre: Pop; disco
- Length: 3:24
- Label: 604; School Boy; Interscope
- Songwriters: Carly Rae Jepsen; CJ Baran; Arthur Besnainou
- Producers: Christopher J Baran; Arthur Besnainou

Carly Rae Jepsen singles chronology
"Shy Boy" (2023)	"More" (2026)	"On Wires" (2026)

Official audio
- "More" on YouTube

"More" is a song by Canadian singer-songwriter Carly Rae Jepsen. It was initially released on August 20, 2025 as the first promotional single from the 10th anniversary edition of her third studio album, Emotion (2015), before being serviced to radio as the lead single on March 2, 2026. The song was Jepsen's first release since 2023's The Loveliest Time.

== Background ==
"More" was written during the studio sessions for Jepsen's third album Emotion between 2013 and 2015. The song was first teased on Jepsen's Instagram profile on August 19, 2025, posting a clip of the song alongside footage of her band rehearsals. It was debuted live that night at a special one-night-only concert at the Troubadour in West Hollywood in celebration of the 10th anniversary of the record it was originally intended for and the song was released the next day.

== Critical reception ==
Melody Lau of CBC Music said that the song was "further proof of Jepsen's ability to craft the perfect pop banger," and that while it features the "slinky bassline, sharp rhythm guitar and the signature synths" found among all the tracks of Emotion, "More explores a more dangerous romantic scenario." Marissa Lorusso of Pitchfork said that "More" sounds like it could have landed on Disco Sweat, Jepsen's unreleased ABBA-inspired disco album.

== Personnel ==
Credits adapted from the Emotion (10th Anniversary Edition) liner notes.

- Carly Rae Jepsen - songwriting, lead vocals
- CJ Baran - songwriting, production, engineering, keys, mellotron, bass, guitar, drums, programming, talk box
- Arthur Besnainou - songwriting, production, engineering, keys, mellotron, bass, guitar, drums, programming, talk box
- Nick Trapani - engineering
- Alex Ghenea - mixing

== Charts ==
Chart performance for "More"
Chart (2025)	Peak position
Japan Hot Overseas (Billboard Japan)	9
