= Boy Problems =

Single by Carly Rae Jepsen

from the album Emotion
- Released: April 8, 2016
- Recorded: c. 2013
- Studio: Echo Studios (Los Angeles)
- Genre: Synth-pop; pop
- Length: 3:42
- Label: 604; Interscope; School Boy
- Songwriters: Carly Rae Jepsen; Greg Kurstin; Sia Furler; Tavish Crowe
- Producer: Greg Kurstin

Carly Rae Jepsen singles chronology
"Last Christmas" (2015)	"Boy Problems" (2016)	"Cut to the Feeling" (2017)

Music video
- "Boy Problems" on YouTube

"Boy Problems" is a song by Canadian singer-songwriter Carly Rae Jepsen recorded for her third studio album, Emotion (2015). Jepsen wrote the song alongside Sia, Tavish Crowe and Greg Kurstin, the latter of which also produced the track. The song was released as the eighth and final single from the album on April 8, 2016. The same day, a music video for the song premiered. "Boy Problems" has been described as a "peppy" 1980s inspired synth-pop track.

== Background and development ==
"Boy Problems" was the first song Carly Rae Jepsen created for her Emotion album. She and her guitarist during The Summer Kiss Tour in 2013 following a "painful" break-up between Jepsen and her boyfriend at the time. Writing continued later with Greg Kurstin and Australian singer-songwriter Sia, someone who Jepsen had been a "huge fan of" and would work with again later during the development of Emotion on the track "Making the Most of the Night". Sia later had a talking part at the start of the song which Jepsen was "stoked about".

== Music video ==
"Boy Problems" received a music video on the same day it was released as a single from Emotion. It was directed by Petra Collins and features Tavi Gevinson, Barbie Ferreira and Paloma Elsesser. Collins had initially reached out to Jepsen requesting to make a video for her personal favourite track of the album, which Jepsen accepted. Jepsen has stated she was a "huge fan" of Collins work. Following Collins' request, the two met up in New York to conceptualize the music video. In February 2016, Jepsen had teased the music video for "Boy Problems" in an interview with Nexus, stating that "we have been cooking up something very special with Petra Collins". The music video has been referred to as "girly", "glittery" and "sparkly".

== Credits and personnel ==
Adapted from liner notes of Emotion.

- Carly Rae Jepsen – vocals, songwriter
- Greg Kurstin – songwriter, engineer, bass, drums, guitar, keyboard
- Sia Furler – vocals, songwriter
- Tavish Crowe – songwriter
- Alex Pasco – engineer
- Julian Burg – engineer
- Manny Marroquin – mixing
- Chris Galland – assistant mixing
- Ike Schultz – assistant mixing
- Gene Grimaldi – mastering
