= Emotion (Carly Rae Jepsen song) =

Single by Carly Rae Jepsen

from the album Emotion
- Written: February – June 2014
- Released: June 2, 2015
- Length: 3:17
- Label: 604; Interscope; School Boy
- Songwriters: Carly Rae Jepsen; Christopher J Baran; Ben Romans; Nate Campany
- Producers: CJ Baran; Ben Romans

Carly Rae Jepsen singles chronology
"All That" (2015)	"Emotion" (2015)	"Run Away With Me" (2015)

Audio video
- "Emotion" on YouTube

"Emotion" (sometimes stylized as E•MO•TION) is a song recorded by Canadian singer-songwriter Carly Rae Jepsen, serving as the titular track to her third studio album, Emotion (2015). The song was released as the third single from the album on June 2, 2015, and was the last song to be released before the album itself came out in Japan on June 24.

== Background and development ==
"Emotion" was written by Jepsen alongside Nate Campany, Christopher J Baran and Ben Romans, the latter two also worked on the songs production. The song was conceived in New York City by Jepsen and Nate Campany in February 2014. Following completion, Jepsen ultimately decided to create an '80s pop with some alternative production' record. There were over 200 songs created for E•MO•TION, but following advice from her A&R manager, Jepsen named her third album after the song. The song was released on June 2, 2015, alongside the track listing of the album.

In May 2015, Jepsen debuted "Emotion" alongside "Run Away With Me" and "Black Heart" at a Beijing concert. The three songs were described as having '80s influence'. In 2020, Jepsen revealed that she thought a music video for "Emotion" would've been 'fun to do' and hinted that it may still be a possibility. The songs lyrics have been described as explaining a 'fantasy'/situationship and the song itself deemed a 'revenge song'.

== Credits and personnel ==
Adapted from liner notes of Emotion.

- Carly Rae Jepsen – vocals, songwriter
- CJ Baran – producer, programming, songwriter
- Ben Romans – producer, programming, songwriter
- Nate Campany – songwriter
- Tom Coyne – mastering engineer
- John Hanes – mixing engineer
- Serban Ghenea – mixing engineer
