= Petra Collins =

Canadian filmmaker, photographer, artist, and model (born 1992)

- Born: December 21, 1992 (age 33); Toronto, Ontario, Canada
- Education: Ontario College of Art and Design
- Occupations: Filmmaker; photographer; artist; model
- Years active: 2010–present
- Website: petra-collins.com

Petra Collins (born December 21, 1992) is a Canadian and Hungarian filmmaker, photographer, artist, and model, who rose to prominence in the early 2010s. She is best known for her signature photography that is characterized by a distinctively feminine, dreamlike aesthetic, informed by a modern female gaze. After gaining attention on Tumblr, Collins was discovered by Tavi Gevinson and became a resident photographer for Rookie magazine in 2011. Since then, she has expanded her career into directing high-profile short films and music videos for artists like Carly Rae Jepsen, Lil Yachty, Selena Gomez, Cardi B, and Olivia Rodrigo.

She has been labeled an "it girl" by photographer and mentor Ryan McGinley and by Vanity Fair and The New Yorker magazines. In 2016, Collins was chosen as a face of Gucci.

== Early life and education ==
Petra Collins was born in Toronto, the eldest child of a Hungarian mother and a Canadian father. In Toronto, she attended Rosedale Heights School of the Arts. It was at Rosedale at the age of 15, Collins began practicing the art of photography. Collins attended Ontario College of Art and Design for two years to study artistic criticism and curatorial practice.

In a Fashionista feature, Collins revealed that she had a hard senior year in high school, having difficulties at home lead her to routinely skip school and ultimately failing her senior year. She turned it around however, by moving to a different method of learning which pointed her in the direction that would bring her career to fruition. After entering an alternative school, she was able to connect with an arts teacher that allowed her to find the creative guidance and freedom that she needed to begin publishing work, which she did shortly thereafter.

== Early career ==
Collins began taking pictures in high school. She met Richard Kern while assisting him on a shoot, and he became her mentor. Simultaneously, Collins became a frequent subject of the photographer Ryan McGinley, and would go on to become one of his proteges. Her work started gaining recognition online, in the early 2010s, through her collaborations with Tavi Gevinson and Rookie magazine. Collins began venturing into the art world, appearing in shows that featured her own work, and curating shows featuring her art collective, The Ardorous. Coinciding with the time of Collins's rising success in the art world, her Instagram account was removed from the platform after the artist posted a photo of herself unwaxed in a bikini. Following the removal of her account, Collins wrote an essay for Oyster Magazine, later republished in The Huffington Post, speaking out against the misogyny which informs media depictions of women's bodies. In 2014, Collins' first solo exhibition, "Discharge", a photo series spanning between 2008 and 2014, from ages 15–21, was hosted at the Capricious 88 Gallery in New York. Collins went on to publish the photo series as a book with Capricious Publishing in 2014.

== Art and photography ==
In 2010, Collins created the website "The Ardorous" as an online platform for young female artists. Reacting to the male-dominated art world, the group's goal is to question contemporary ideologies of femininity and recast women in positive, empowered roles. Collins has also edited a book called Babe with a foreword by Tavi Gevinson, which is a culmination of over 30 international artists selected by Petra.

In 2016, Collins was named one of Dazed & Calvin Klein's 100 Creatives Shaping Youth Culture and one of Vogue's 40 Creatives To Watch in 2016. Collins was also named one of 30 Artists to Watch by Artsy.

Collins hosted her first public art piece with Contact Photo on April 29, 2017, at King and Spadina in Toronto, Canada.

When shooting photography, Collins exclusively uses 35 mm film.

== Directing ==
In 2015, she directed a three-part documentary series entitled Making Space, which documents and explores what it means to be a young person in today's constantly changing, hyperconnected world. Other projects Collins has directed include Carly Rae Jepsen's music video for her 2015 single "Boy Problems", Cardi B's 2018 single "Bartier Cardi" and Olivia Rodrigo's 2021 single "Good 4 U" and "brutal". She has also directed advertisements for Gucci, Adidas, and Nordstrom.

=== Work on Euphoria ===
At the invitation of Sam Levinson, Collins moved to Los Angeles in 2018/2019 to work on the HBO series Euphoria. Collins stated that Levinson told her "I wrote a show based on your photos. Will you direct it?", and spent five months developing the series with Levinson, including casting principal actors, before being dismissed for being "too young" to direct.

Collins stated that the worst thing "was when people were unknowingly saying this show looks like your photos", referring to the heavily stylized look of Euphoria. Even before Collins revealed her version of events, reviewers of Euphoria pointed out the similarities between the work.

== Modeling and acting ==
In 2014 and 2015, Collins was cast in a supporting role in Amazon's award-winning television series, Transparent.

Collins has previously been featured as a model in Calvin Klein's campaign.

In 2016, Petra was tapped as a new face of Gucci, and walked in their 2016 F/W Fashion Show in Milan. She also starred in their 2016 F/W campaign.

== Literary work ==
Collins' first book, Discharge, was published by Capricious Publishing. The series was first an exhibition of the same name, hosted at the Capricious 88 gallery.

Her second book, Babe, an art and photography collection featuring the work of thirty female artists from around the world, including her own, was published in 2015 by Random House.

In a collaboration with Euphoria star Alexa Demie, who she first met via Instagram in 2020, Collins and Demie released an erotic photography book that reimagined fairy tales from their childhood through an erotic lens. The 152-page hardbound book collected nine different short tales accompanied by images of Demie dressed up as different mythical beings, was released by Rizzoli on November 30, 2021.

In 2026, once again in collaboration with Rizzoli, Collins released her book STAR, a photography book which explores the topics of fame, fanhood and obsession through the lives of fictional popstars.

== Filmography ==
=== Film ===
Year	Name	Notes	Ref.
2015	Drive Time	Short film	
2015	Adidas StellaSport – "Break a Sweat"	Short film	
2015	Making Space	Three-part documentary short	
2016	Georgia O'Keeffe – Interpreted by Petra Collins	Short film	
2016	Lil' Yachty – "Keep Sailing"	Short film	
2017	Hungarian Dream for Gucci Eyewear	Short film	
2017	Spring 2017 at Nordstrom		
2018	A Love Story	Short film	
TBD	Spiral	Feature film	

=== Television ===
Year	Title	Note(s)
2023	American Horror Stories	Episode: "Organ"

=== Music videos ===
Year	Artist	Song	Notes	Ref.
2012	Trust	Heaven		
2015	Carly Rae Jepsen	Boy Problems		
2015	Blood Orange	Time Will Tell	Part of "Making Space"	
2016	Lil Yachty	All In		
2017	Selena Gomez and Gucci Mane	Fetish		
2018	Cardi B and 21 Savage	Bartier Cardi		
2021	Olivia Rodrigo	Good 4 U		
2021	Olivia Rodrigo	Brutal		
2023	Olivia Rodrigo	Vampire		
2023	Olivia Rodrigo	Bad Idea Right?		
2024	Selena Gomez and Benny Blanco	Sunset Blvd		
2026	ROSALÍA	Focu’ Ranni		
2026	Olivia Rodrigo	Drop Dead		
