= Run Away with Me =

2015 single by Carly Rae Jepsen

Single by Carly Rae Jepsen

from the album Emotion
- Released: July 17, 2015
- Studio: MXM (Stockholm, Sweden); Wolf Cousins (Stockholm, Sweden)
- Genre: Dance-pop; synth-pop
- Length: 4:11
- Label: 604; School Boy; Interscope
- Songwriters: Carly Rae Jepsen; Robin Fredriksson; Mattias Larsson; Oscar Holter; Jonnali Parmenius; Karl Schuster
- Producers: Mattman & Robin; Shellback

Carly Rae Jepsen singles chronology
"Emotion" (2015)	"Run Away with Me" (2015)	"Warm Blood" (2015)

Music video
- "Run Away with Me" on YouTube

"Run Away with Me" is a song by Canadian singer Carly Rae Jepsen. It was released as the fourth single from her third studio album Emotion on July 17, 2015, by Universal Music Group. She wrote the track with Jonnali Parmenius, Oscar Holter, and its producers Mattman & Robin (credited as Mattias Larsson and Robin Fredriksson), and Shellback. "Run Away with Me" is a dance-pop and synth-pop tune with an upbeat production containing a distorted, reverbed saxophone riff.

"Run Away with Me" was accompanied by a do it yourself (DIY) music video filmed by Jepsen's then-partner David Kalani Larkins in Paris, Tokyo and New York City, which also premiered in July 2015. The song charted within the top 30 in the Czech Republic, Scotland, and Slovakia. It was met with widespread critical acclaim, being considered one of the best songs of 2015 and of the 2010s.

== Music and production ==
"Run Away with Me" runs for four minutes and eleven seconds. Carly Rae Jepsen wrote the song with duo Mattman & Robin, who is credited separately as Mattias Larsson and Robin Fredriksson, Shellback, Jonnali Parmenius, and Oscar Holter. Production was handled by Shellback and Mattman & Robin, who also programmed it. "Run Away with Me" is a dance-pop and synth-pop track featuring a distorted, reverbed saxophone riff. The upbeat production incorporates percussive synths, pedal tones, multi-tracked vocals and cavernous drums. Rachel Seo from Variety said the song has a "galloping beat and soaring chorus".

== Critical reception ==
"Run Away with Me" received universal acclaim from music critics. Spin magazine referred to "Run Away with Me" as "the best pop song of 2015 yet", "an undeniable hit waiting in the wings for its moment", and a "big, bold, beautiful masterpiece". Paper magazine hailed the song as "just as much the pop perfection that is 'I Really Like You'" and "the perfect anthemic summer jam". USA Today welcomed "Run Away with Me" as "a marked improvement over ['I Really Like You']". Time magazine wrote of the track, "'Run Away With Me' marries euphoric Swedish dance-pop with a pressing nostalgia for your teenage years, a time when the littlest crushes felt like time bombs and a time Jepsen is really, really, really skilled at evoking. In that sense, it’s 'Teenage Dream 2.0', right down to a bridge so catchy she has to repeat it twice".

Rolling Stone ranked "Run Away with Me" at number 49 on their year-end list of the 50 best songs of 2015. Village Voice named "Run Away with Me" the 11th-best single released in 2015 on their annual year-end critics' poll, Pazz & Jop. Pitchfork ranked it at number 36 on their 200 best songs of the decade list, saying that "fueled by a yearning saxophone riff and colossal drums, Jepsen gleefully repeats her heartfelt invitation until the rest of the world melts away. "Over the weekend, we could turn the world to gold," she murmurs with a quiet devotion, letting the image of two gilded lovers linger in the air." Spotify ranked it at number 5 on its list of the 100 Greatest Pop Songs of the Streaming Era, calling it "euphoric, overwhelming, and transformative, 'Run Away With Me' is the pop song even people who 'don’t like pop' believe in."

Variety's Rachel Seo named it Jepsen's best song in October 2022, writing that its "galloping beat and soaring chorus is the stuff of every coming-of-age swan song for those whose bildungsromane were written, or re-written, during the [2010s], joining the array of tracks — like Lorde's 'Green Light' or Taylor Swift's 'Style' — that have emerged as frontrunners of music written to express something profound about growing up and falling hard. 'Run Away With Me' feels the same played anywhere at any time of day: transcendent, timeless and completely given over to the feeling, with an intentional disregard of whether that feeling is love or its imitation."

=== Year-end lists ===
Publication	Rank	List
Vulture.com	5	The 10 Best Songs of 2015
Popmatters	8	The 90 Best Songs of 2015
Noisey	9	The 50 Best Songs of 2015
Rolling Stone	11	Rob Sheffield's Top 25 Songs of 2015
Stereogum	14	The 50 Best Pop Songs of 2015
Fuse	20	20 Best Songs of 2015
Spin	22	The 101 Best Songs of 2015
Consequence of Sound	25	Top 50 Songs of 2015
Pitchfork Media	28	The 100 Best Tracks of 2015
Rolling Stone	49	50 Best Songs of 2015

=== Decade-end lists ===
Publication	Rank	List
Consequence of Sound	20	Top 100 Songs of the 2010s
Rolling Stone	31	Rob Sheffield's 50 Best Songs of the 2010s
Pitchfork	36	The 200 Best Songs of the 2010s
Insider	39	The 113 Best Songs of the Past Decade, Ranked

== Commercial performance ==
"Run Away with Me" did not repeat the major commercial success of the previous single and only made a minor impact on the charts. It reached the top 30 in Czech Republic, Slovakia and Scotland, and briefly charted within the top 100 in the UK, Ireland, Canada and Australia.

== Music video ==
The "Run Away with Me" music video was released on July 17, 2015, on Jepsen's YouTube and Vevo channels. It was directed by her then-partner David Kalani Larkins and consists of guerrilla-style footage filmed on three different continents. Larkins accompanied Jepsen on tour, casually filming a personal footage of her, which later developed into creating a music video. The clip pictures the singer in the Place de la République, Place Charles de Gaulle and on the Eiffel Tower in Paris, in Shibuya Crossing and a karaoke bar in Tokyo, and in New York City where she is seen running along the fountain in Columbus Circle and pointing at the Statue of Liberty from a boat in New York Bay. The clip also sees Jepsen in hotel rooms, airports and on public city transport. More footage was filmed in Dublin, London and Toronto, but it wasn't used in the final video.

== Live performances ==
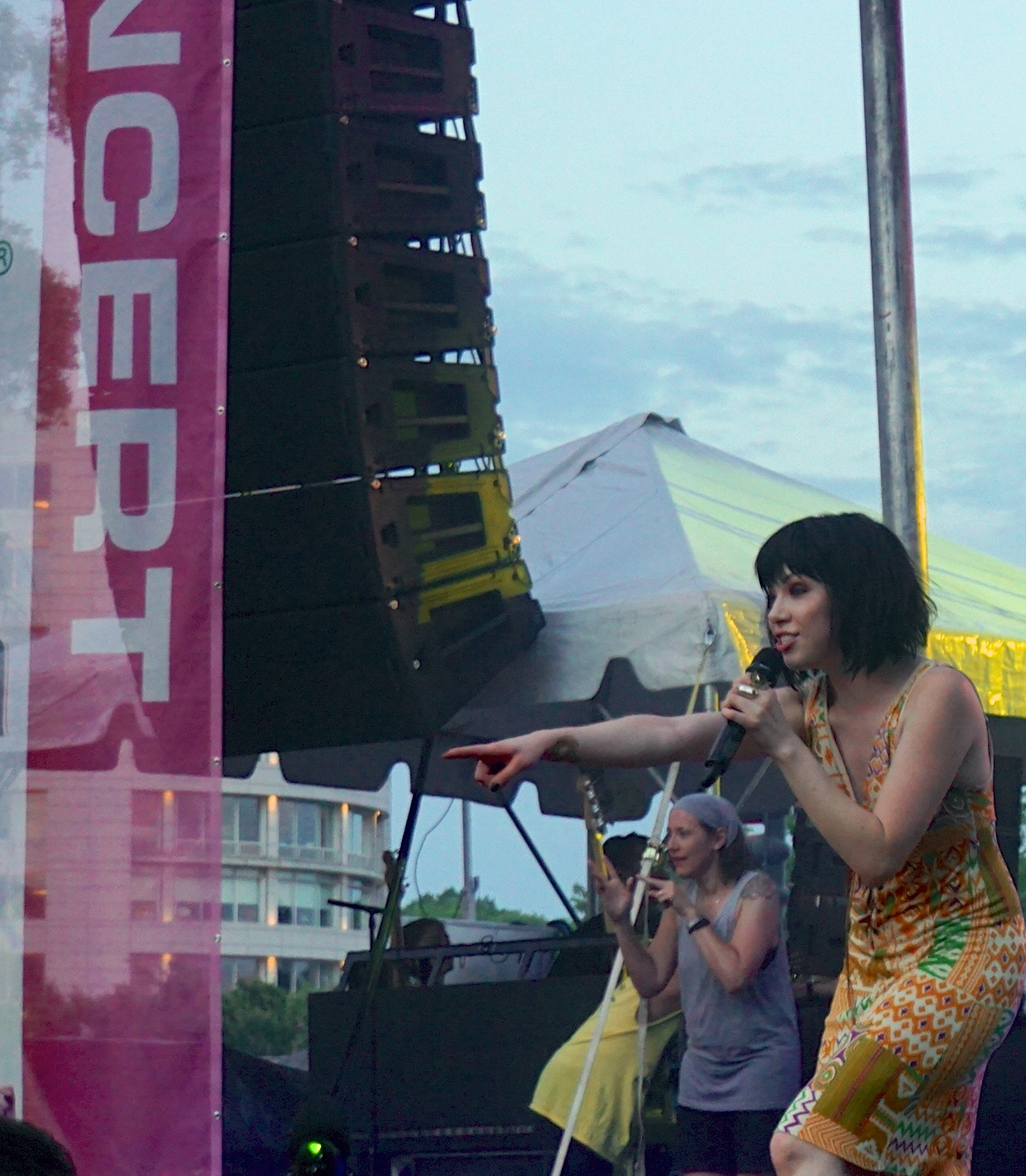
Jepsen performed "Run Away with Me" at the Capital Pride in 2015

On May 1, 2015, Jepsen performed "Run Away with Me" during a show in Beijing, China. She then performed the song on The Tonight Show with Jimmy Fallon on August 19 and subsequently at The Today Show 2 days later, the same day as the release of E•MO•TION in the United States. The track was performed as the opening song on Jepsen's 2015–2016 Gimmie Love Tour. In October 2015, Jepsen performed the song during season 11 of Idols South Africa at the Voortrekker Monument in Pretoria.

== Notable covers ==
- John Newman covered "Run Away With Me" in 2015 for BBC Radio 1's Live Lounge series.
- "Run Away With Me" was covered by Leland and Peter Thomas in 2018.
- Future Teens covered the song in 2018 as part of a full-length Emotion tribute album for charity.
- In 2019, San Fermin covered the song at Paste Studio.
- Adam Neely arranged a reharmonized version of the song featuring Kate Steinberg in 2020.
- Lorde covered the song on her 2022 Solar Power Tour.

== Track listings ==
- Digital download (Remixes)
1. "Run Away with Me" (ASTR Remix) – 5:33
2. "Run Away with Me" (Cyril Hahn Remix) – 4:52
3. "Run Away with Me" (Y2K Remix) – 4:28
4. "Run Away with Me" (Cardiknox Remix) – 4:21
5. "Run Away with Me" (Liam Keegan Remix) – 4:11
6. "Run Away with Me" (Velvet Sunrise Remix) – 3:46
- Digital download (Remixes, Pt. 2)
1. "Run Away with Me" (Patrick Stump Remix) – 4:10
2. "Run Away with Me" (Ayokay Remix) – 3:31
3. "Run Away with Me" (EMBRZ Remix) – 4:39

== Personnel ==
Credits are adapted from the liner notes of Emotion:

- Carly Rae Jepsen – lead vocals, songwriting, background vocals
- Mattman & Robin – production, programming, guitar, bass, drums, percussion, background vocals
  - Mattias Larsson – songwriting
  - Robin Fredriksson – songwriting
- Shellback – songwriting, production
- Jonnali Parmenius – songwriting, background vocals
- Oscar Holter – songwriting, background vocals
- Wojtek Goral – saxophone
- Sibel Redžep – background vocals
- Ludvig Söderberg – background vocals
- Jakob Jerlström – background vocals
- Oscar Göress – background vocals
- Serban Ghenea – mixing
- John Hanes – engineer for mix
- Tom Coyne – mastering

== Charts ==
Weekly chart performance
Chart (2015)	Peak position
Australia (ARIA)	100
Canada Hot 100 (Billboard)	83
Czech Republic Singles Digital (ČNS IFPI)	17
Finland Airplay (Radiosoittolista)	42
Ireland (IRMA)	82
Scottish Singles Sales (Official Charts)	24
Slovakia Airplay (ČNS IFPI)	64
Slovakia Singles Digital (ČNS IFPI)	15
Sweden Heatseeker (Sverigetopplistan)	9
UK Singles (Official Charts)	58
US Pop Digital Songs (Billboard)	49
US Dance Club Songs (Billboard)	53

== Certifications ==
Certifications and sales
Region	Certification	Certified units/sales
Brazil (Pro-Música Brasil)	Gold	30,000^{‡}
New Zealand (RMNZ)	Gold	15,000^{‡}
United Kingdom (BPI)	Silver	200,000^{‡}
^{‡} Sales+streaming figures based on certification alone.

== Release history ==
Release dates and formats
Country	Date	Format	Label
Spain	22 June 2015	Contemporary hit radio	Universal
Various	17 July 2015	Digital download	Universal
United States	21 July 2015	Contemporary hit radio	Schoolboy; Interscope
Various	13 August 2015	Digital download – Remixes EP	Schoolboy; Interscope
United Kingdom	21 August 2015	Contemporary hit radio	Schoolboy; Interscope
Italy	11 September 2015	Contemporary hit radio	Universal
Various	15 April 2016	Digital download – Remixes EP (Pt. 2)	Schoolboy; Interscope

== In popular culture ==
- This song was used in the tenth episode of the fourth season of Mr. Robot entitled "410 Gone";
- Jepsen re-recorded the song in the fictional Simlish language for The Sims 4: Get Together;
- The song was used as a lip-sync song on the fifth episode of season three of Canada's Drag Race being performed by contestants Lady Boom Boom and Kimmy Couture.
- The song appears in the eighth episode of the second season of Heartstopper.
- The song is featured in the mission “Day Release” from the 2026 video game Grand Theft Auto VI.
