= Ballerina (2016 film) =

2016 animated musical adventure comedy film

- French theatrical release poster
- Directed by: Éric Summer; Éric Warin
- Written by: Éric Summer; Laurent Zeitoun; Carol Noble
- Produced by: Laurent Zeitoun; Yann Zenou; Nicolas Duval Adassovsky; André Rouleau; Valérie d'Auteuil
- Starring: Elle Fanning; Dane DeHaan; Maddie Ziegler; Carly Rae Jepsen
- Cinematography: Jericca Cleland
- Edited by: Yvann Thibaudeau
- Music by: Klaus Badelt
- Production company: L'Atelier Animation
- Distributed by: Entertainment One (Canada); Gaumont (France)
- Release dates: 19 October 2016 (Paris); 14 December 2016 (France); 24 February 2017 (Canada)
- Running time: 89 minutes
- Countries: Canada; France
- Language: English
- Budget: $30 million
- Box office: $120 million

Ballerina (titled Leap! in the United States) is a 2016 3D animated musical adventure comedy film co-directed by Éric Summer and Éric Warin and written by Summer, Carol Noble and Laurent Zeitoun. A co-production between Canadian and French companies, the film takes place in 1880s France and follows an orphan girl who dreams of becoming a ballerina and gets a chance to audition for the celebrated school of the Paris Opera Ballet.

Ballerina stars the voices of Elle Fanning, Dane DeHaan, Maddie Ziegler and Carly Rae Jepsen. The film was released in cinemas in France and the United Kingdom on 12 December 2016, followed by releases in various countries over the following several months, including Canada on 24 February 2017. The film was released in the United States on 25 August 2017, with the voices of Nat Wolff (who replaced DeHaan), Kate McKinnon and Mel Brooks added. Ballerina received generally mixed reviews from critics, but was a box office success, grossing $120 million worldwide against a $30 million budget.

A sequel and television series are planned.

== Plot ==
In the 1880s, eleven-year-old Félicie, an orphan girl who dreams of becoming a ballerina, but lacks formal training, runs away from her orphanage in rural Brittany, France, with her best friend, Victor, a young inventor, who has a crush on her. Together they go to Paris, but they soon become separated, and Victor becomes an office boy in Gustave Eiffel's workshop. Félicie finds her way to the Paris Opera, where the guard catches her trespassing. She is rescued by a mysterious cleaner with a limp, Odette, who agrees to let Félicie stay with her until she gets on her feet. Odette works for both the Opera and for the cruel and imperious Régine Le Haut, a wealthy restaurant owner. While helping Odette clean, Félicie spies Regine's daughter, Camille, practicing ballet. Camille sees Félicie, insults her, and throws Félicie's treasured music box out of the window, breaking it. As Félicie takes it to Victor for repair, she intercepts the postman who brings a letter from the Opera admitting Camille to the celebrated school of the Paris Opera Ballet partly because of her mother's connection. In her anger, Félicie hides the letter and decides to assume Camille's identity to get into the school and pursue her dream.

Odette agrees to mentor Félicie, who later learns that Odette was a former prima ballerina. Félicie finds her training very difficult, but with Camille's letter of acceptance, she manages to take her place at the ballet school. Mérante, the school's exacting choreographer, announces that one of the girls from the class will be chosen to dance the role of Clara in The Nutcracker. Each day, he dismisses the worst dancer in class, but Félicie improves every day and narrowly avoids elimination. Mérante happens to see Félicie dance passionately in a bar that she and Victor visit, reluctantly admiring her for it. A couple of days before the final elimination, Félicie's lie is discovered; Mérante decides to admit Camille into the class, while also letting Félicie stay, although Félicie's infraction was serious. The night before the final elimination, Félicie neglects training to go out on a date with Rudi, a handsome boy from the school, which disappoints Odette. Victor sees Félicie with Rudi and becomes jealous; he and Félicie argue. The next day, Félicie is late to the audition and unable to perform well, and so the part of Clara goes to Camille.

Regine sends Félicie back to her orphanage, where she loses her spirit. She has a dream about being an infant in the arms of her late mother, a ballerina, who gave her the music box. She decides to return to Paris to help Odette and apologize to Victor. While cleaning the stage, Félicie encounters Camille, and they engage in a dance battle that is witnessed by all the students, Odette and Mérante. Félicie does a grand jeté over a flight of stairs, while Camille cannot. Mérante approaches the two girls and asks them why they dance, to which Camille admits that she dances only because her mother forces her to, while Félicie speaks stirringly of dance as her inheritance and passion. Camille admits that Félicie should dance the role of Clara.

Near Eiffel's workshop, where the Statue of Liberty is being constructed, Félicie invites Victor to the performance. A furiously deranged Régine arrives and chases Félicie up to the crown of the statue, but Victor saves her with aid from Camille and traps Régine in the scaffolding. Arriving at the Opera just in time, Félicie dons Odette's special pointe shoes. Félicie kisses Victor on the cheek, and she performs in The Nutcracker alongside the principal ballerina.

== Cast ==
- Elle Fanning as Félicie
- Dane DeHaan (Nat Wolff in the American version) as Victor
- Carly Rae Jepsen as Odette
- Maddie Ziegler as Camille Le Haut
- Mel Brooks (American version only) as M. Luteau, the supervisor of the orphanage
- Julie Khaner (Kate McKinnon in the American version) as Régine Le Haut, Camille's mother
  - (McKinnon also voiced the Mother Superior and Félicie's mother in the American version)
- Terrence Scammell as Mérante (American version as Janitor as well)
- Bronwen Mantel as the Mother Superior, the head of the orphanage

There is also a French language version of the film, with the voices of Camille Cottin as Félicie and Malik Bentalha as Victor, that premiered in France on December 14, 2016.

== Production ==
The film was produced at L'Atelier Animation in Montreal, Quebec, Canada. The filmmakers used key frame animation of Aurélie Dupont and Jérémie Bélingard, two étoiles (star dancers) of the Paris Opera Ballet, to translate realistic dance choreography to the animated film. Dupont became the de facto choreographer of the film's dance sequences.

== Music ==
The soundtrack album was released internationally by Gaumont on December 12, 2016. The album features both the film's original score composed by Klaus Badelt, and songs from other artists that are used in the film. The film also features songs that are not included in the album, such as "Cut to the Feeling" and "Runaways" by Jepsen and "Suitcase" by Sia.

The Japanese version has a new ending theme titled "Félicies", sung by Félicie's Japanese voice actress, Tao Tsuchiya.

=== Soundtrack ===
No.	Title	Artist	Length
1.	"You Know It's About You"	Magical Thinker, Stephen Wrabel	3:43
2.	"Be Somebody"	Chantal Kreviazuk	3:42
3.	"Unstoppable"	Camila Mora	4:16
4.	"Blood Sweat and Tears"	Magical Thinker, Dezi Paige	3:38
5.	"Confident"	Demi Lovato	3:27
6.	"Ballerina"	Klaus Badelt	4:05
7.	"Dreams and the Music Box"	Klaus Badelt	3:19
8.	"Escaping the Orphanage"	Klaus Badelt	3:50
9.	"The Liberty Chase"	Klaus Badelt	3:56
10.	"Swan Lake, Op. 20a: Scene"	Chappell Recorded	3:11
11.	"Shannon Reel"	Daniel Darras, Youenn Le Berre	2:38
12.	"You Know It's About You" (Piano & Voice Bonus Track)	Magical Thinker, Stephen Wrabel	3:36

US release
No.	Title	Artist	Length
5.	"Rainbow"	Liz Huett	2:54

== Release ==
The film premiered at the Mon premier Festival on October 19, 2016, and it was released in France and the UK in December 2016. Numerous releases followed around the world. Entertainment One Films Canada distributed the film in Canada, with the theatrical release beginning on February 24, 2017 in Quebec and March 3, 2017 elsewhere in Canada.

In May 2016, The Weinstein Company acquired distribution rights to the film in the United States. A US release was first scheduled for March 3, 2017, under the title Leap! The release was subsequently pushed back to April 21, 2017, followed by additional casting announcements of Wolff, Brooks, and McKinnon. It was then pushed back to August 30 and later moved up to August 25, 2017.

== Reception ==
=== Box office ===
According to Variety, Ballerina grossed approximately US$120 million worldwide. It opened in France on 14 December 2016 with over half a million admissions, earning €2.2 million (~US$2.4 million) over the course of the weekend. Its French gross eventually reached $14.5 million. In Canada, it earned more than Can$1.5 million during the first 13 days of its theatrical run, $1.1 million of which was made in Quebec. It ultimately grossed a total of Can$3.6 million (~US$2.8 million) in Canada. It was released on 25 August 2017 in the United States, earning $4.7 million over its opening weekend. It grossed $21.9 million in the US, the film's highest-grossing territory.

=== Critical response ===
On review aggregator website Rotten Tomatoes, the original version of the film holds an approval rating of 75% based on 32 reviews, with an average rating of 5.7/10. The critical consensus reads, "Ballerina's rich setting and beautifully animated dance sequences elevate a solidly crafted all-ages adventure with a surprising amount of colorful flair." On French entertainment information website AlloCiné, the film has an average grade of 3.5/5, based on 17 critics. On Rotten Tomatoes, the US version of the film, entitled Leap!, has an approval rating of 53% based on 91 reviews, with an average rating of 4.86/10. The critical consensus for the US version reads, "From its bland story to its unremarkable animation, Leap! does little to distinguish itself from a long list of like-minded – and superior – family-friendly alternatives." On Metacritic, which assigns a normalized rating to reviews, the film has a weighted average score 48 out of 100, based on 18 critics, indicating "mixed or average" reviews. Audiences polled by CinemaScore gave the film an average grade of "A" on an A+ to F scale.

Melissa Stewart of Insights magazine of Australia called the film "a heart-warming adventure. ... With the animation capturing the elegance of ballet, it is hard not to be mesmerised by the pirouettes and grand jetés. ... [Félicie's] journey will resonate with for anyone who has experienced the sting of failure and trying to figure out how to bounce back. All of this occurs while humour is trickled throughout the movie making it enjoyable for kids and parents alike. ... [T]he themes of fighting for your passion and dreams is timeless." Mike McCahill of The Guardian wrote: "It's attentively, attractively designed – with a real eye for the light hitting the buildings of a city under construction – but a shade more Black Swan in its DNA might have made the happy ending less inevitable and its pep less repetitive." Matt Zoller Seitz of RogerEbert.com gave the film one and a half out of four stars, criticizing its numerous "3-D animation clichés" which he said spoil the potential of its original premise, stating that "The best thing about [Leap!] is its portrayal of the dance world, then and now, as both exhilarating and cruel. ... But [the film] doesn't seem to grasp how special these elements are ... it keeps wasting [Félicie's] time (and ours) with theoretically comic or suspenseful subplots that we've seen done many times before, with considerably more wit and feeling".

== Planned sequel and series ==
An animated film sequel began production in June 2026, with Laurent Zeitoun, the screenwriter, directing. Release is planned for late 2029, and a television series is also planned.

== Accolades ==
Award ceremony	Category	Recipient	Result	Ref.
45th Annie Awards	Outstanding Achievement for Production Design in an Animated Feature Production	Florent Masurel, Pierre-Antoine Moelo, Julien Meillard, Jean-Jacques Cournoyer – Leap! – Main Journey	Nominated	
8th Hollywood Music in Media Awards	Best Original Song in an Animated Film	"Confident" from Leap! - Written by Demi Lovato, Ilya Salmanzadeh, Max Martin and Savan Kotecha; Performed by Demi Lovato	Won	
