= All That (song) =

2015 song by Carly Rae Jepsen

Single by Carly Rae Jepsen

from the album Emotion
- Released: April 5, 2015
- Recorded: 2014
- Studio: United Recording, Hollywood, California; Heavy Dunt Studios, Burbank, California; Lounge Studios, New York City, New York
- Genre: Pop; R&B
- Length: 4:38
- Label: 604; School Boy; Interscope
- Songwriters: Carly Rae Jepsen; Ariel Rechtshaid; Devonté Hynes
- Producers: Rechtshaid; Hynes

Carly Rae Jepsen singles chronology
"I Really Like You" (2015)	"All That" (2015)	"Emotion" (2015)

Audio video
- "All That" on YouTube

"All That" is a song by Canadian singer Carly Rae Jepsen from her third studio album, Emotion (2015). It was released as the second single from the album on April 5, 2015, via 604, School Boy, and Interscope Records. The song was written by Jepsen and producers Ariel Rechtshaid, and Dev Hynes. Rechtshaid and Hynes also handled production.

Upon its release, "All That" was praised for the 1980s influence in the song. Jepsen debuted the song at Saturday Night Live on April 4, 2015 and it became available to digital retailers the next day as the next single from the album following "I Really Like You".

== Background ==
Jepsen began combing through Dev Hynes' discography after becoming infatuated with "Losing You" by Solange and finding Hynes listed in its production credits. Jepsen sought to work with him, stating she was a fan, which Hynes hesitated to believe. He was eventually "won over" by Jepsen's demonstration of her vocal ability and work ethic, and credited her with genuine intentions of "[developing] a new aesthetic" versus pursuing "Pitchfork-approved artists" for the sake of indie credibility. The pair worked in a Chelsea studio between Jepsen's Cinderella performances. Jepsen was sent a demo of "All That" where she wrote the bridge and produced the vocals herself, and Ariel Rechtshaid was brought in for additional work. In an interview with NPR, Jepsen called the song "probably [her] favorite song from the album".

== Live performances ==
Jepsen served as musical guest during an episode of Saturday Night Live on April 4, 2015, and performed "I Really Like You" as well as the new song "All That". In 2016, she performed the song at the YouTube Space in Los Angeles and Pitchfork Music Festival, both times accompanied by Dev Hynes.

== Critical reception ==
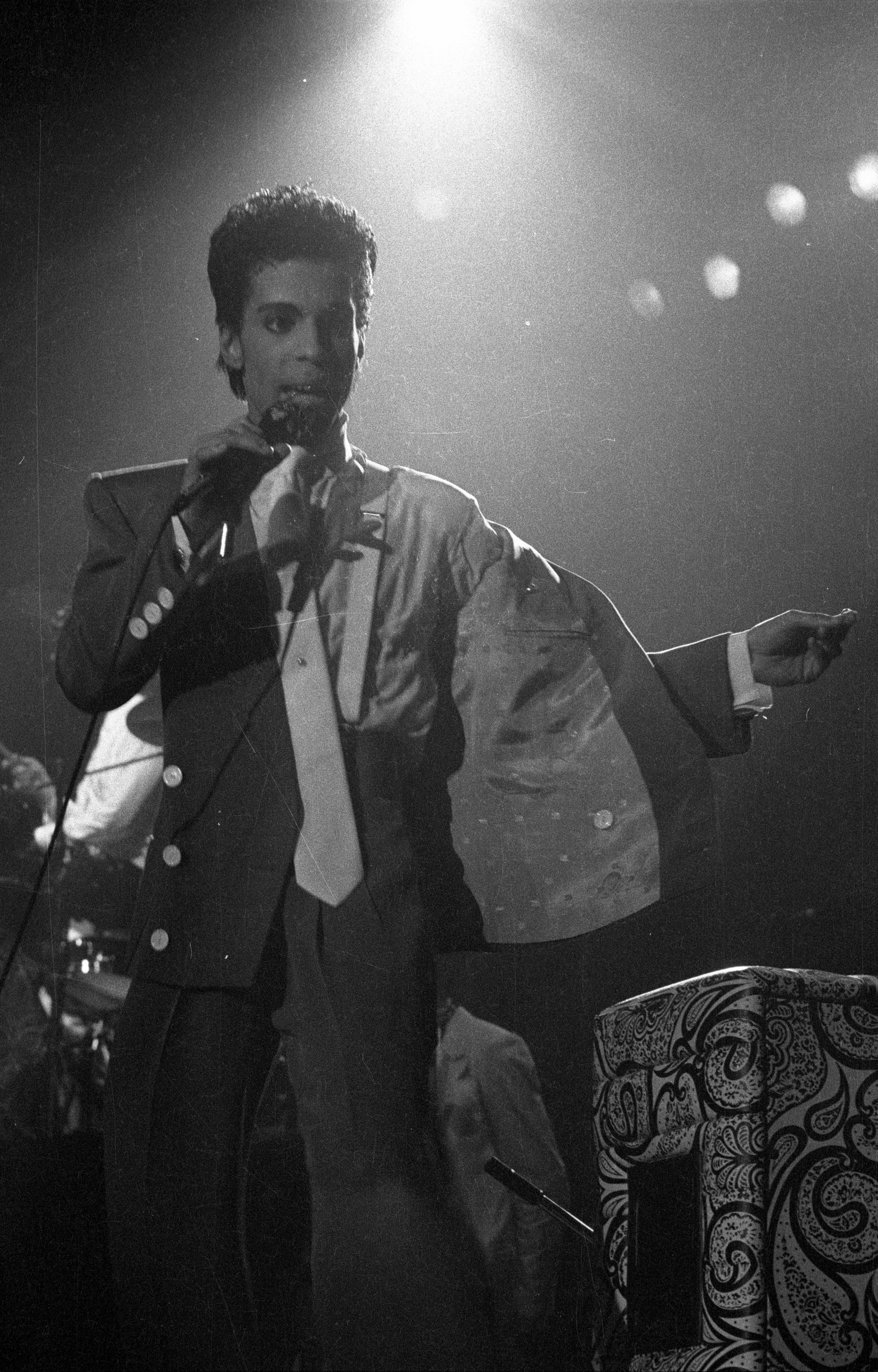
Many critics noted Prince's influence on "All That".

Pitchfork Media awarded "All That" their "Best New Track" feature, calling the song's conclusion a "tour de force climax". They add that the chorus has "innocence set against its absence" and makes "finding a friend feels like a profound step beyond becoming lovers".

=== Year-end lists ===
Publication	Rank	List
USA Today	*	The 50 Best Songs Of 2015
The Fader	96	The 107 Best Songs of 2015
Complex	45	The Best Songs of 2015

== Track listings ==
- Digital download/streaming
1. "All That" — 4:38
- Digital download/streaming (Remix)
1. "All That" (The Knocks Remix) — 5:10

== Release history ==
Country	Date	Format	Label	Ref.
Canada	5 April 2015	Digital download	604	
United States	5 April 2015	Digital download	School Boy; Interscope	
France	6 April 2015	Digital download	Polydor	
Netherlands	6 April 2015	Digital download	Universal	
Spain	6 April 2015	Digital download	Universal	
