= Your Type =

Single by Carly Rae Jepsen

from the album Emotion
- Released: August 14, 2015
- Recorded: 2015
- Genre: Synth-pop; electropop
- Length: 3:19
- Label: 604; Interscope; School Boy
- Songwriters: Carly Rae Jepsen; Rami Yacoub; Carl Falk; Wayne Hector; Tavish Crowe
- Producers: Carl Falk; Rami Yacoub

Carly Rae Jepsen singles chronology
"Making the Most of the Night" (2015)	"Your Type" (2015)	"Last Christmas" (2015)

Music video
- "Your Type" on YouTube

"Your Type" is a song recorded by Canadian singer Carly Rae Jepsen for her third studio album, Emotion (2015). She co-wrote the track with Wayne Hector, Tavish Crowe, and its producers Rami Yacoub and Carl Falk. "Your Type" is a 1980s-inspired synth-pop song about unrequited love. The song was issued as the seventh single on August 14, 2015. An official remix package debuted December 11, 2015. An accompanying music video was released on November 3, 2015. The song received mostly positive feedback from the critics. It did not have chart success, only entering three component charts in Canada.

== Composition ==
"Your Type" is a midtempo synth-pop and electropop love song influenced by 1980s music. The ballad finds Jepsen expressing her interest in pursuing a romantic relationship with someone despite her belief that she is not their "type" and explores the concept of unrequited love. During live performances, she revealed that the song was about a guy whom she fell for who she later finds out was gay, similar to what her single "Call Me Maybe"'s video was about.

== Critical reception ==
"Your Type" received generally positive reviews. Critics have compared the song's depiction of heartbreak and yearning to the similarly-themed "Dancing on My Own" by Robyn. Its production was further likened to that of the synthpop band Chvrches. In October 2022, Rachel Seo of Variety ranked it as Jepsen's sixth best song.

In reviewing for NPR, Ken Tucker highlighted "Your Type" as a clear example of Jepsen's "attempt to expand the notion of what disposable pop can sound like", further applauding its vulnerable narrative that transcends gender roles. Autostraddle's Abeni Jones christened the song as a "Moody Trans Girl Anthem".

Nolan Feeny of Time praised Jepsen's "wounded voice" for bringing emotional complexity to an otherwise "unremarkable tale". In criticizing Jepsen's lack of identity, Pitchfork's Corban Goble characterized her vocal performance on "Your Type" as indistinguishable from other songs on the record despite Jepsen's attempts to sound "gritty". Jessica Doyle, a writer for The Singles Jukebox, emphasized the song's lyrical missteps which "intensifies the pathos of the song—the narrator wants so badly to stand out [...] but even her desperate inner monologue is bland."

== Commercial performance ==
Upon its release in late 2015, "Your Type" was not a commercial success and did not enter any music charts. In early 2016, the song stayed unranked for five weeks on the Ultratip Bubbling Under chart in Wallonia, the French-speaking region of Belgium. The song generated renewed interest in Canada in the spring of 2016 and entered Canadian airplay charts dated May 14, 2016.

== Music video ==
The video for "Your Type" was filmed in October 2015 directed by Gia Coppola and premiered November 3, 2015. It begins with a voiceover introducing the story of Jepsen's character ("There was once a girl…") and then follows Jepsen as she gets mugged on a park bench, enters a nightclub, and performs karaoke. During her performance, the video alternates between shots of a large, excited crowd and a nearly-empty bar, suggesting the former is Jepsen's fantasy of how the scene played out. The video's plot has been described as a pseudo-Cinderella story.

== Live performances ==
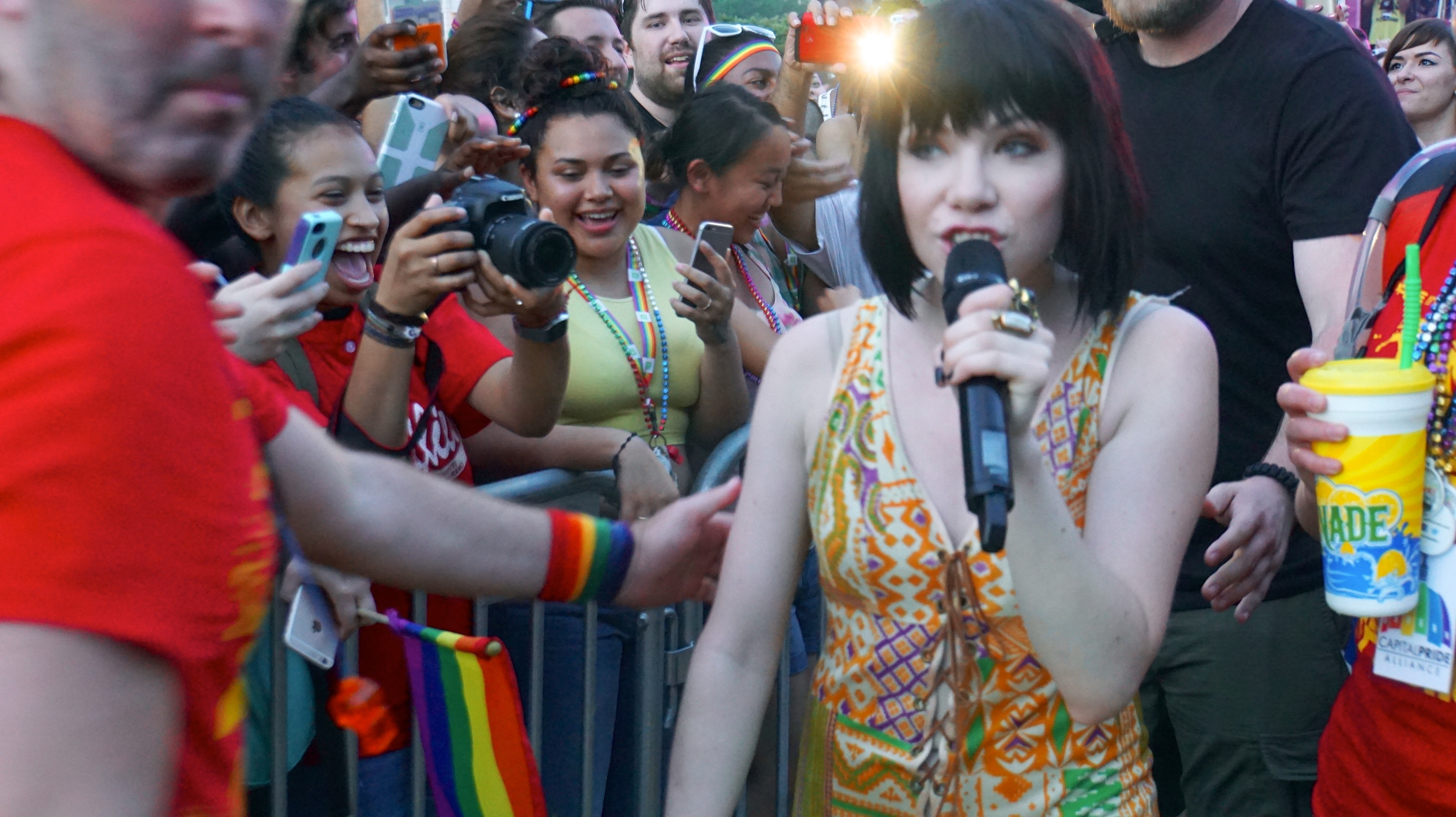
Jepsen performed "Your Type" at the Capital Pride in 2015.

On 1 May 2015, Jepsen performed "Your Type" at a show in Beijing, China, and subsequently at the Capital Pride in June. She then performed a medley of "Run Away with Me" and "Your Type" at Late Night with Seth Meyers on 26 January 2016. The song was also part of the setlist during Jepsen's 2015–2016 Gimmie Love Tour.

== Track listings ==
- Digital download
1. "Your Type" – 3:20
- Digital download (Remixes)
1. "Your Type" (Young Bombs Remix) – 4:22
2. "Your Type" (Skylar Spence Remix) – 3:50

== Charts ==
Chart (2016)	Peak position
Canada AC (Billboard)	21
Canada CHR/Top 40 (Billboard)	32
Canada Hot AC (Billboard)	23

== Release history ==
Country	Date	Format	Version	Label	Ref.
Canada	August 14, 2015	Digital download	Original	604	
United States	August 14, 2015	Digital download	Original	Interscope; School Boy	
Europe	November 9, 2015	Digital download	Original	Interscope; School Boy	
Europe	December 11, 2015	Digital download	Remixes EP	Interscope; School Boy	
Oceania	December 11, 2015	Digital download	Remixes EP	Interscope; School Boy	
Canada	December 18, 2015	Digital download	Remixes EP	604	
United States	December 18, 2015	Digital download	Remixes EP	Interscope; School Boy	
