= I Really Like You =

2015 single by Carly Rae Jepsen

Single by Carly Rae Jepsen

from the album Emotion
- Released: March 2, 2015
- Genre: Dance-pop; synth-pop
- Length: 3:24
- Label: 604; School Boy; Interscope
- Songwriters: Carly Rae Jepsen; Jacob Kasher Hindlin; Peter Svensson
- Producers: Peter Svensson; Jeff Halatrax

Carly Rae Jepsen singles chronology
"Take a Picture" (2013)	"I Really Like You" (2015)	"All That" (2015)

Music video
- "I Really Like You" on YouTube

"I Really Like You" is a song recorded by Canadian singer Carly Rae Jepsen for her third studio album, Emotion (2015). It was written by Jepsen, Jacob Kasher Hindlin, Peter Svensson, and Steve DaMar; and produced by Svensson. The song was released as the album's lead single on March 2, 2015.

"I Really Like You" peaked at number 14 on the Canadian Hot 100. Outside of Canada, the song topped the charts in Hong Kong and Scotland, peaked within the top ten of the charts in Czech Republic, Denmark, Finland, Japan, Poland, the Republic of Ireland, South Africa, and the United Kingdom, and peaked within the top 20 of the charts in Austria, Germany, Slovakia and Switzerland. It was the second-most-played song of 2015 on Japanese radio. The song's accompanying music video starred Tom Hanks and featured Justin Bieber, and was released 3 days after the song.

== Writing and production ==
"I Really Like You" was written by Jepsen, Jacob Kasher Hindlin and Peter Svensson, and produced by the latter. According to Jepsen, the song's lyrics are about "that time in a relationship when it's too soon to say 'I love you,' but you're well past, 'I like you' and you're at the 'I really, really like you' stage."

== Composition ==
Soraya Nadia McDonald of The Washington Post characterized "I Really Like You" as a synth-pop song, musically reminiscent of Jepsen's previous album Kiss (2012), 1980s music and Solange Knowles' EP True (2012). The Verge's Emily Yoshida noted elements of 1980s and new wave. Ryan Reed of Rolling Stone described the track as a "dance-pop number". Musically, the song is written in the key of F major, with a tempo of 122 beats per minute. Jepsen's vocals span from G3 to high note of D5.

== Critical reception ==
Jason Lipshutz of Billboard called the song "really (really) fun" and "a breathless 80's banger that comes back to [2012 single] 'Call Me Maybe''s fixation on ultra-crisp percussion and blurted-out flirtation". Idolator's Bianca Gracie described "I Really Like You" as "mind-blowing, fantastic, catchy-as-hell pop".

In October 2022, Rachel Seo of Variety ranked "I Really Like You" as Jepsen's 13th best song, writing: "'I want you. Do you want me? Do you want me too?' reads like a succession of desperate Snapchat messages, but Jepsen's ascending soprano seamlessly weaves through Jeff Halavacs and Peter Svensson's electro-pop production, sounding more enthusiastic than anything else."

== Commercial performance ==
In Canada, "I Really Like You" debuted at number 14 on the Canadian Hot 100 issued for March 21, 2015, marking Jepsen's seventh top 40 hit in Canada.

In the United States, "I Really Like You" debuted at number 48 on the Billboard Hot 100 on March 21, 2015, selling 38,000 copies in its first week. It peaked at number 39 on 2 May 2015, marking Jepsen's third top 40 hit in the United States.

In the United Kingdom, the song debuted and peaked at number three on the UK Singles Chart on May 3, 2015 – for week ending date May 9, 2015 – a position it maintained for two consecutive weeks. In September 2020, the song re-entered the UK iTunes chart and has remained inside the top 100 for two months since.

== Music video ==
The music video, which stars American actor and filmmaker Tom Hanks, was directed by Peter Glanz. Jepsen filmed part of the song's music video on February 16, 2015, in front of the Mondrian Hotel in Manhattan alongside Hanks, Justin Bieber and a troupe of dancers. Also making cameo appearances in the video are Rudy Mancuso and King Bach, well-known users of the short-form video sharing application Vine. The video was released on March 6, 2015. CBC Music's Nicolle Weeks described it as "a more affable version" of the music video for the Verve's "Bitter Sweet Symphony" (1997). The music video has been rated as one of 10 Best Music Videos of 2015 (So Far) by the readers of Billboard.

== Live performances and covers ==
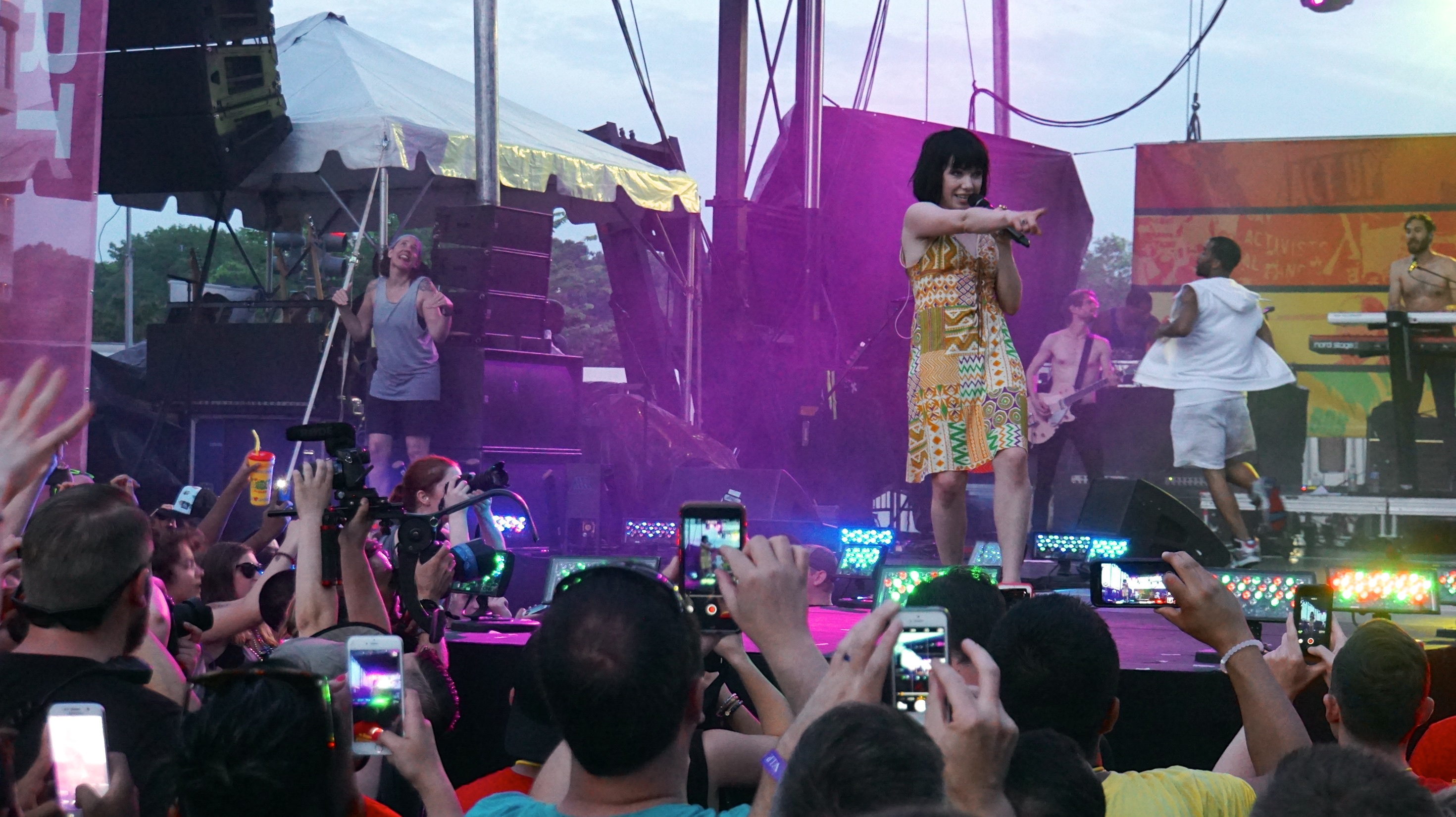
Jepsen performed "I Really Like You" at the Capital Pride in 2015.

Jepsen performed "I Really Like You" live on Good Morning America on its release day and was followed by a performance on Jimmy Kimmel Live! on March 5, 2015, and again on March 11 on Sunrise. She also performed the song on Saturday Night Live, Castle, Jimmy Kimmel Live!, Dancing with the Stars, Much Music Video Awards, and The Ellen DeGeneres Show.

== Track listings ==
Digital download

1. "I Really Like You" – 3:24

Digital download – Remixes EP

1. "I Really Like You" (Blasterjaxx remix) – 3:35
2. "I Really Like You" (The Scene Kings remix) – 3:17
3. "I Really Like You" (The Scene Kings extended remix) – 4:35
4. "I Really Like You" (Wayne G. club mix) – 7:39
5. "I Really Like You" (Liam Keegan remix radio edit) – 3:09
6. "I Really Like You" (Liam Keegan extended remix) – 4:39

== Charts ==
=== Weekly charts ===
Weekly chart positions for "I Really Like You"
Chart (2015)	Peak position
Australia (ARIA)	37
Austria (Ö3 Austria Top 40)	11
Belgium (Ultratop 50 Flanders)	43
Belgium (Ultratop 50 Wallonia)	44
Canada Hot 100 (Billboard)	14
Canada CHR/Top 40 (Billboard)	36
Canada Hot AC (Billboard)	26
CIS Airplay (TopHit)	11
Czech Republic Airplay (ČNS IFPI)	17
Czech Republic Singles Digital (ČNS IFPI)	7
Denmark (Tracklisten)	7
Euro Digital Songs (Billboard)	3
Finland (Suomen virallinen lista)	10
France (SNEP)	39
Germany (GfK)	15
Hong Kong (HKRIA)	1
Hungary (Editors' Choice Top 40)	15
Hungary (Single Top 40)	27
Hungary (Stream Top 40)	19
Ireland (IRMA)	3
Italy (FIMI)	42
Japan Hot 100 (Billboard)	4
Japan Hot Overseas (Billboard)	1
Mexico (Billboard Ingles Airplay)	17
Mexico Anglo (Monitor Latino)	11
Netherlands (Dutch Top 40)	13
Netherlands (Single Top 100)	16
New Zealand (Recorded Music NZ)	25
Norway (VG-lista)	22
Poland Airplay (ZPAV)	10
Scottish Singles Sales (Official Charts)	1
Slovakia Airplay (ČNS IFPI)	16
Slovakia Singles Digital (ČNS IFPI)	15
Slovenia (SloTop50)	13
South Africa Airplay (EMA)	5
Spain (Promusicae)	27
Sweden (Sverigetopplistan)	25
Switzerland (Schweizer Hitparade)	15
UK Singles (Official Charts)	3
US Billboard Hot 100	39
US Dance Club Songs (Billboard)	36
US Pop Airplay (Billboard)	30

=== Year-end charts ===
2015 year-end chart positions for "I Really Like You"
Chart (2015)	Position
Austria (Ö3 Austria Top 40)	70
Canada (Canadian Hot 100)	88
CIS (Tophit)	105
Denmark (Tracklisten)	51
Germany (Official German Charts)	66
Japan (Japan Hot 100)	6
Japan Hot Overseas (Billboard Japan)	1
Japan Radio Songs (Billboard Japan)	2
Netherlands (Dutch Top 40)	71
Netherlands (Single Top 100)	83
Russia Airplay (Tophit)	105
Spain (PROMUSICAE)	82
Sweden (Sverigetopplistan)	80
Switzerland (Schweizer Hitparade)	59
Taiwan (Hito Radio)	37
UK Singles (OCC)	44

2016 year-end chart positions for "I Really Like You"
Chart (2016)	Position
Japan (Japan Hot 100)	95
Japan Hot Overseas (Billboard Japan)	7
Japan Radio Songs (Billboard Japan)	98

== Certifications ==
Certifications for "I Really Like You"
Region	Certification	Certified units/sales
Australia (ARIA)	Platinum	70,000^{‡}
Brazil (Pro-Música Brasil)	Platinum	60,000^{‡}
Canada (Music Canada)	Gold	40,000^{*}
Denmark (IFPI Danmark)	Platinum	60,000^{^}
Germany (BVMI)	Gold	200,000^{‡}
Italy (FIMI)	Platinum	50,000^{‡}
Japan (RIAJ)	2× Platinum	500,000^{*}
New Zealand (RMNZ)	Platinum	30,000^{‡}
Poland (ZPAV)	Platinum	20,000^{‡}
Spain (Promusicae)	Gold	20,000^{*}
Sweden (GLF)	2× Platinum	80,000^{‡}
United Kingdom (BPI)	Platinum	600,000^{‡}
United States (RIAA)	Platinum	1,000,000^{‡}
Streaming
Japan (RIAJ)	Gold	50,000,000^{†}
^{*} Sales figures based on certification alone.^{^} Shipments figures based on certification alone.^{‡} Sales+streaming figures based on certification alone.^{†} Streaming-only figures based on certification alone.

== Release history ==
Release dates and formats for "I Really Like You"
Country	Date	Format	Label	Ref.
Australia	2 March 2015	Digital download	Schoolboy; Interscope	
Canada	2 March 2015	Digital download	604	
Germany	2 March 2015	Digital download	Schoolboy; Interscope	
Mexico	2 March 2015	Digital download	Schoolboy; Interscope	
New Zealand	2 March 2015	Digital download	Schoolboy; Interscope	
United States	2 March 2015	Digital download	Schoolboy; Interscope	
United States	24 March 2015	Contemporary hit radio	Schoolboy; Interscope	
Italy	27 March 2015	Contemporary hit radio	Interscope	
United Kingdom	26 April 2015	Digital download	Schoolboy; Interscope	
Italy	8 May 2015	Contemporary hit radio	Universal	
