= The So Nice Tour =

2022–23 concert tour by Carly Rae Jepsen

So Nice Tour
- Tour by Carly Rae Jepsen
- Promotional poster for the tour
- Location: Asia; Australia; Europe; North America
- Associated album: The Loneliest Time
- Start date: 21 September 2022
- End date: 13 August 2023
- No. of shows: 46 in North America; 10 in Europe; 7 in Asia; 6 in Australia; 69 total

Carly Rae Jepsen concert chronology
- The Dedicated Tour (2019–20); So Nice Tour (2022–23); Day and Night Tour (2027)

The So Nice Tour was the fourth concert tour by Canadian recording artist Carly Rae Jepsen. Launched in support of her sixth studio album The Loneliest Time (2022), The tour began on 21 September 2022 and concluded on 13 August 2023.

== Background ==
The tour was announced 7 June 2022, shortly after the release of the album's first single, "Western Wind". American singer/songwriter, Empress Of would be announced alongside and serve as the support act for the entire North American leg of the tour, except for two co-headlining shows announced a month prior, that Jepsen would perform with American rock band, Bleachers in Cleveland and Toronto respectively. The tour commenced in Montreal, Canada on 24 September 2022 and marked as her first set of live performances since 2019.

Jepsen aligned with non-profit, PLUS1 to have one dollar for every ticket sold from all shows (in North America) donated to The Ally Coalition. This organization supports homeless and at-risk LGBTQ youth. During Fall 2022, the United Kingdom, Ireland and Australian legs of the tour were announced and proceeded between February and March 2023, with the former supported by French singer/songwriter, Lewis OfMan.

== Critical reception ==
Reviews for the concerts in America have been positive. Many critics noted Jepsen's showmanship and exuberant energy during the shows. For the concert in Boston, Abigail A. Golden (The Harvard Crimson) writes Jepsen was a "joy to watch". She continues, "With a 27-song setlist, Jepsen's stamina was commendable. In leaping across the stage, trekking up flights of stairs to engage with the members of her band, and coordinating dances with backup vocalists Sophi Bairley and Julia Ross, the singer kept the energy up throughout her entire performance."

Moving to Philadelphia, Maureen Walsh (WXPN) states she enjoyed how the music was the main attraction of the show. She wrote, "All night, I kept looking around seeing people singing along, having a great time and losing themselves dancing to some fun freaking music. Carly's moonlady animation was right: forget your cares and enjoy yourself every once in a while, it will do you a world of good."

For the concert in Los Angeles, Jefferson Lim (Annenberg Media) says the performance "radiated energy". He says, "The nearly 90-minute show was an unforgettable, energetic night of fun. Jepsen performed non-stop with such vigor and passion that it was just too hard not to dance and sing along. If love is a lonely road, then we can rest easy knowing that we have the comfort of Jepsen's music to go along with it."

== Setlist ==
North America

The following setlist was performed during the concert held on 12 October 2022, at the Mission Ballroom, in Denver, Colorado. It is not intended to represent all concerts for the duration of the tour.

1. "This Love Isn't Crazy"
2. "Let's Sort the Whole Thing Out"
3. "Run Away With Me"
4. "Too Much"
5. "Talking to Yourself"
6. "Julien"
7. "Warm Blood"
8. "Emotion" / "Favourite Colour"
9. "Call Me Maybe"
10. "Stay Away"
11. "Comeback"
12. "Western Wind"
13. "I Really Like You"
14. "Want You in My Room"
15. "Now That I Found You"
16. "Your Type"
17. "For Sure"
18. "Go Find Yourself or Whatever"
19. "Beach House"
20. "Boy Problems" / "Fake Mona Lisa"
21. "Cry"
22. "The Loneliest Time"
23. "When I Needed You"
  Encore
24. "I Didn't Just Come Here to Dance"
25. "All That"
26. "Cut to the Feeling"
Europe

The following setlist was performed during the concert held on 4 February 2023, at the Olympia Theatre, Dublin, Ireland. It is not intended to represent all concerts for the duration of the European leg of the tour.

1. "Surrender My Heart"
2. "Summer Love"
3. "Run Away with Me"
4. "Talking to Yourself"
5. "Too Much"
6. "Julien""
7. "Bends"
8. "Western Wind"
9. "Bad Thing Twice"
10. "Emotion" / "Favourite Colour"
11. "Call Me Maybe"
12. "Stay Away"
13. "For Sure"
14. "So Nice"
15. "I Really Like You"
16. "Want You in My Room"
17. "Shooting Star"
18. "Now That I Found You"
19. "Move Me" (with Lewis OfMan)
20. "Go Find Yourself or Whatever"
21. "Beach House"
22. "When I Needed You"
  Encore
23. "I Didn't Just Come Here to Dance"
24. "The Loneliest Time"
25. "Cut to the Feeling"
Asia

The following setlist was performed during the concert held on 4 March 2023, at the Filinvest City Event Grounds, Muntinlupa, Philippines. It is not intended to represent all concerts for the duration of the Asian leg of the tour.

1. "Surrender My Heart"
2. "Joshua Tree
3. "Run Away with Me"
4. "Too Much"
5. "Julien"
6. "Talking to Yourself"
7. "Emotion" / "Favourite Colour"
8. "Call Me Maybe"
9. "Stay Away"
10. "Bad Thing Twice"
11. "Western Wind"
12. "So Nice"
13. "I Really Like You"
14. "Want You in My Room"
15. "Your Type"
16. "Boy Problems"
17. "Now That I Found You"
18. "I Didn't Just Come Here To Dance"
19. "The Loneliest Time"
20. "When I Needed You"
  Encore
21. "Go Find Yourself or Whatever"
22. "Beach House"
23. "Cut to the Feeling"

== Shows ==
List of concerts, showing date, city, country, venue and opening act
Date	City	Country	Venue	Opening act(s)
North America
21 September 2022	Cleveland	United States	Jacobs Pavilion	Bleachers
22 September 2022	Toronto	Canada	Budweiser Stage	Bleachers
24 September 2022	Montreal	Canada	M Telus	Empress Of
26 September 2022	Boston	United States	Roadrunner	Empress Of
28 September 2022	New York City	United States	Radio City Music Hall	Empress Of
29 September 2022	Washington, D.C.	United States	The Anthem	Empress Of
1 October 2022	Philadelphia	United States	The Met Philadelphia	Empress Of
2 October 2022	Norfolk	United States	The NorVa	Empress Of
4 October 2022	Knoxville	United States	Tennessee Theatre	Empress Of
5 October 2022	Atlanta	United States	The Eastern	Empress Of
7 October 2022 (Note: Part of Austin City Limits Music Festival.)	Austin	United States	Zilker Park	—N/a
9 October 2022	Houston	United States	713 Music Hall	Empress Of
10 October 2022	Dallas	United States	South Side Ballroom	Empress Of
12 October 2022	Denver	United States	Mission Ballroom	Empress Of
14 October 2022	Salt Lake City	United States	The Union Event Center	Empress Of
15 October 2022	Paradise (Note: Promoted as Las Vegas)	United States	The Theater at Virgin Hotels	Empress Of
17 October 2022	Phoenix	United States	Arizona Financial Theatre	Empress Of
18 October 2022	Los Angeles	United States	Greek Theatre	Empress Of
20 October 2022	Santa Barbara	United States	Arlington Theatre	Empress Of
21 October 2022	Berkeley	United States	Hearst Greek Theatre	Empress Of
23 October 2022	Portland	United States	Roseland Theater	Empress Of
24 October 2022	Portland	United States	Roseland Theater	Empress Of
26 October 2022	Seattle	United States	Showbox SoDo	Empress Of
27 October 2022	Seattle	United States	Showbox SoDo	Empress Of
29 October 2022	Vancouver	Canada	Thunderbird Sports Centre	Empress Of
2 November 2022	Madison	United States	The Sylvee	Empress Of
4 November 2022	Kansas City	United States	Uptown Theater	Empress Of
6 November 2022	Chicago	United States	Byline Bank Aragon Ballroom	Empress Of
10 January 2023	Denver	United States	Mission Ballroom	Belinda Carlisle; They Might Be Giants
Europe
4 February 2023	Dublin	Ireland	3Olympia Theatre	Lewis OfMan
5 February 2023	Dublin	Ireland	3Olympia Theatre	Lewis OfMan
7 February 2023	Leeds	United Kingdom	O_{2} Academy Leeds	Lewis OfMan
8 February 2023	Glasgow	United Kingdom	O_{2} Academy Glasgow	Lewis OfMan
9 February 2023	Manchester	United Kingdom	O_{2} Apollo Manchester	Lewis OfMan
11 February 2023	Birmingham	United Kingdom	O_{2} Institute	Lewis OfMan
12 February 2023	Bristol	United Kingdom	O_{2} Academy	Lewis OfMan
13 February 2023	Brighton	United Kingdom	Brighton Dome	Lewis OfMan
15 February 2023	London	United Kingdom	Alexandra Palace	Lewis OfMan
Australasia
4 March 2023 (Note: Part of Wanderland Music and Arts Festival.)	Muntinlupa	Philippines	Filinvest City Event Grounds	—N/a
7 March 2023	Sydney	Australia	Enmore Theatre	—N/a
8 March 2023	Sydney	Australia	Enmore Theatre	—N/a
9 March 2023	Brisbane	Australia	The Tivoli	—N/a
12 March 2023 (Note: Part of Golden Plains Festival.)	Meredith	Australia	Meredith Supernatural Amphitheatre	—N/a
13 March 2023	Melbourne	Australia	Forum Theatre	—N/a
14 March 2023	Melbourne	Australia	Forum Theatre	—N/a
North America
1 April 2023 (Note: Part of Northeastern University's Springfest.)	Boston	United States	Matthews Arena	—N/a
2 April 2023 (Note: Part of Bigelow Bash.)	Pittsburgh	United States	Bigelow Boulevard	—N/a
27 May 2023 (Note: Part of BottleRock Napa Valley.)	Napa	United States	Napa Valley Expo	—N/a
3 June 2023	Asbury Park	United States	Stone Pony Summer Stage	—N/a
4 June 2023 (Note: Part of Outloud at WeHo Pride.)	West Hollywood	United States	West Hollywood Park	—N/a
Eurasia
23 June 2023 (Note: Part of Glastonbury Festival.)	Pilton	United Kingdom	Worthy Farm	—N/a
28 June 2023	Yokohama	Japan	National Convention Hall	—N/a
30 June 2023	Nagoya	Japan	Nagoya Century Hall	—N/a
2 July 2023	Kanazawa	Japan	Hondanomori Hall	—N/a
3 July 2023	Osaka	Japan	Orix Theater	—N/a
5 July 2023	Hiroshima	Japan	Ueno Gakuen Hall	—N/a
6 July 2023	Fukuoka	Japan	Fukuoka Sun Palace	—N/a
North America
18 July 2023 (Note: The 18 July 2023 show in Blaine was presented by Pandora during the Target USA Cup.)	Blaine	United States	National Sports Center	—N/a
1 August 2023 (Note: Part of Lollapalooza aftershow)	Chicago	United States	Metro	Kid Sister
3 August 2023	Chicago	United States	Grant Park	—N/a
5 August 2023 (Note: Part of Osheaga Festival.)	Montreal	Canada	Parc Jean-Drapeau	—N/a
7 August 2023	New York	United States	Pier 17	Poolside
8 August 2023	New York	United States	Pier 17	Poolside
11 August 2023	Los Angeles	United States	The Bellwether	Harvey Sutherland
12 August 2023	Los Angeles	United States	The Bellwether	Harvey Sutherland
13 August 2023	Los Angeles	United States	The Bellwether	Harvey Sutherland
