= Psychedelic Switch =

Song by Carly Rae Jepsen

from the album The Loveliest Time
- Released: July 28, 2023
- Genre: French touch; house; synth-pop; disco
- Length: 4:32
- Label: 604; Schoolboy; Interscope
- Songwriters: Carly Rae Jepsen; Kyle Shearer; Nate Cyphert
- Producer: Kyle Shearer

"Psychedelic Switch" is a song by Canadian singer-songwriter Carly Rae Jepsen, released on July 28, 2023 as part of the album The Loveliest Time.

== Background and release ==
"Psychedelic Switch" was originally recorded for The Loneliest Time. Though it would not make the final track list for that album, it remained a personal favourite song of Jepsen's and she was determined to include it on the album's b-sides project. Jepsen described the song as the sister song to "The Loneliest Time", with both being the heads of their respective albums.

The song was first teased by Jepsen on July 18, 2023 alongside the rest of the tracks on The Loveliest Time through a crossword puzzle posted to her social media profiles, where "Psychedelic Switch" was described as "a new love so high that it feels like a mushroom trip." In the days leading up the album's release, Jepsen posted multiple clips of the song to her Instagram profile. The song was officially released as part of The Loveliest Time on July 28, 2023.

== Composition ==
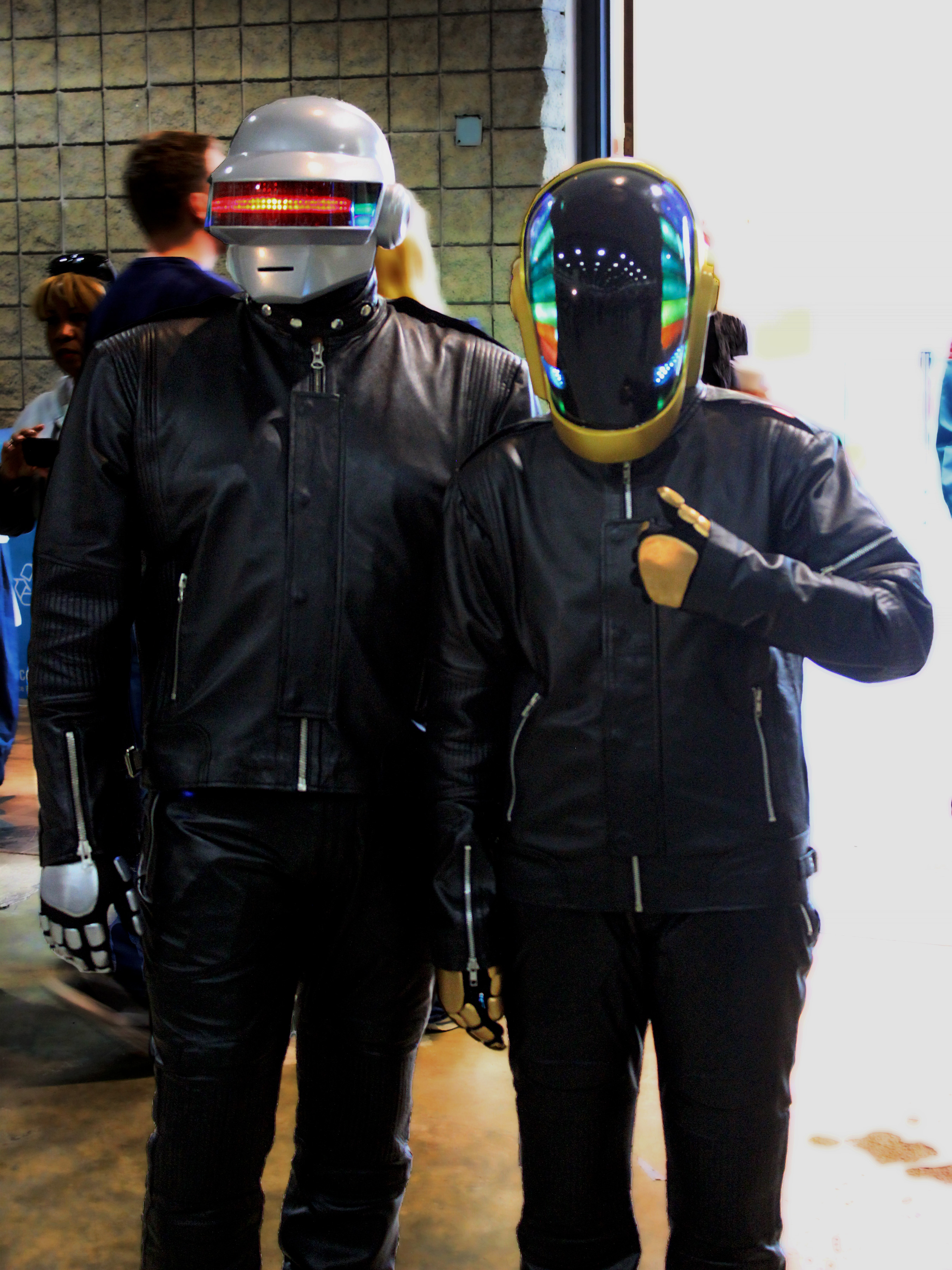
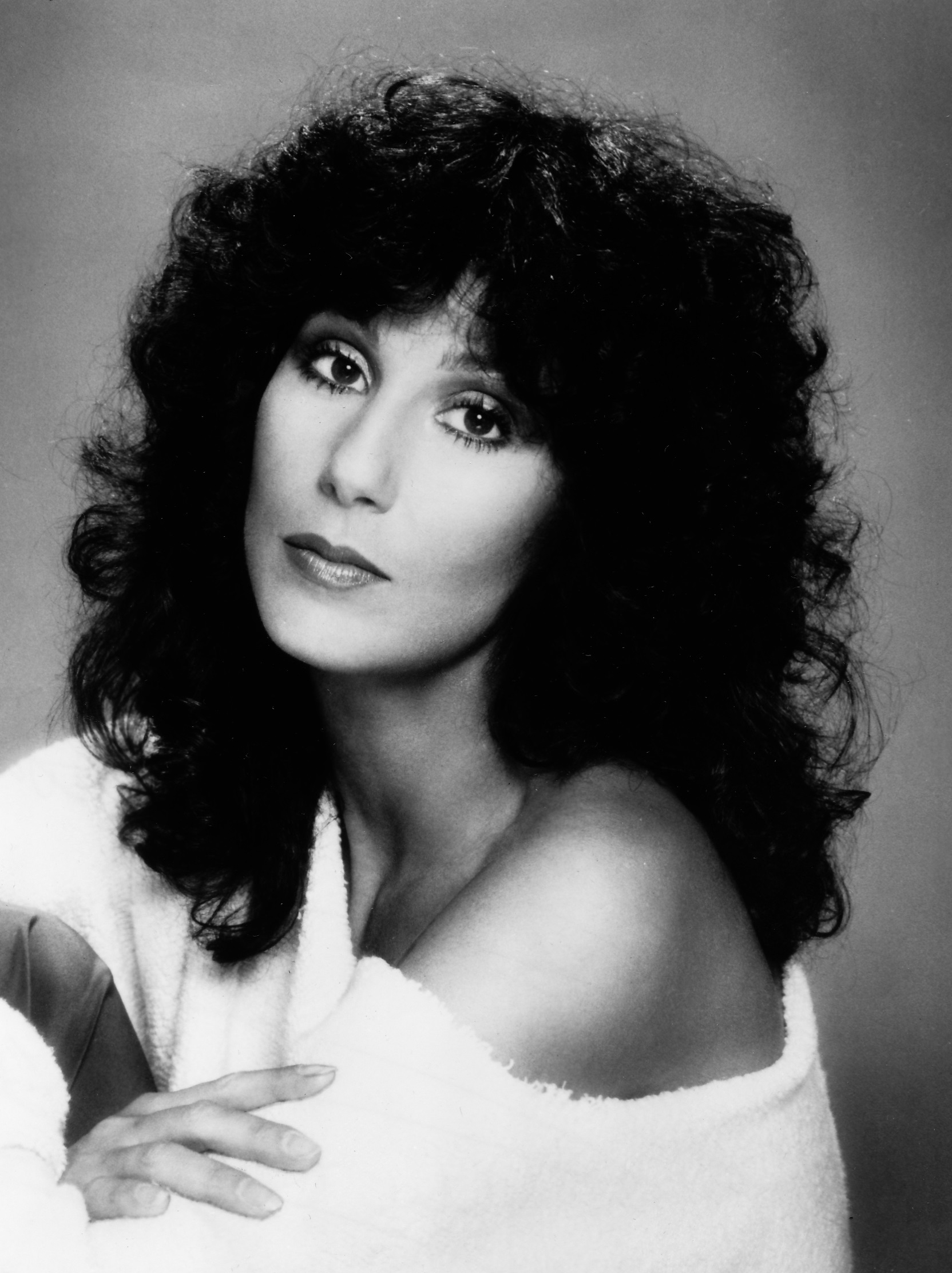
"Psychedelic Switch" has been likened to the works of Daft Punk and Cher.

"Psychedelic Switch" is a pop song that draws from French touch, house music and synth-pop, and harkens back to Daft Punk's Discovery and Cher's disco recordings. Described as being "both seductively catchy and ready for a dance floor," the song "evokes the concept of love as transcendence" through lyrics like "I was a sad, sad song before we met / But boy your love is such a trip, it's like a psychedelic switch." It makes direct reference to psychedelic experiences.

== Critical reception ==
"Psychedelic Switch" was met with critical acclaim upon its release, and has been cited as one of Jepsen's career highlights. It was awarded "best new track" by Pitchfork, with Jaeden Pinder writing that it was "the highlight of her new B-sides album."

=== Rankings ===
Year-end rankings for Psychedelic Switch
Publication	List	Rank	Ref.
Business Insider	20 Best Songs of 2023	16	
Consequence	200 Best Songs of 2023	44	
The Fader	100 Best Songs of 2023	100	
Paste	100 Best Songs of 2023	67	
Pitchfork	100 Best Songs of 2023	50	
Variety	65 Best Songs of 2023	49	

== Credits ==
Credits adapted from The Loveliest Time liner notes.

- Carly Rae Jepsen - songwriting, vocals, backing vocals
- Kyle Shearer - songwriting, production, backing vocals, bass, guitar, synthesizer, drum programming, engineering
- Nate Cyphert - songwriting, backing vocals
- Ike Schultz - mixing
- Ruairi O'Flaherty - mastering

== Charts ==
Chart (2023)	Peak position
US Hot Dance/Electronic Songs (Billboard)	29
