= Recession pop =

Dance-pop music that emerged during the Great Recession

- Stylistic origins: Electropop; dance-pop; synth-pop; bubblegum pop; house; EDM
- Cultural origins: Late 2000s to early 2010s, United States and United Kingdom

Other topics
- Hyperpop; alternative pop

Recession pop is a loosely defined style of music predominantly associated with dance-pop and electropop that emerged during the Great Recession in the United States in the late 2000s to early 2010s.

The term was originally coined to describe a wave of uptempo, catchy, repetitive, feel-good pop music characterized by fast BPMs, high-energy production and catchy melodies, that was produced in the wake of the 2008 global financial crisis, with lyrics centered around embracing hedonism, youthfulness, freedom, and constant partying in the midst of an economic recession. It often blends dance-pop with elements of electronic dance music, synth-pop, and electropop. The genre is seen as reflective of a broader cultural trend during economic downturns, where art serves both as a critique of the times and a coping mechanism.

== Etymology ==
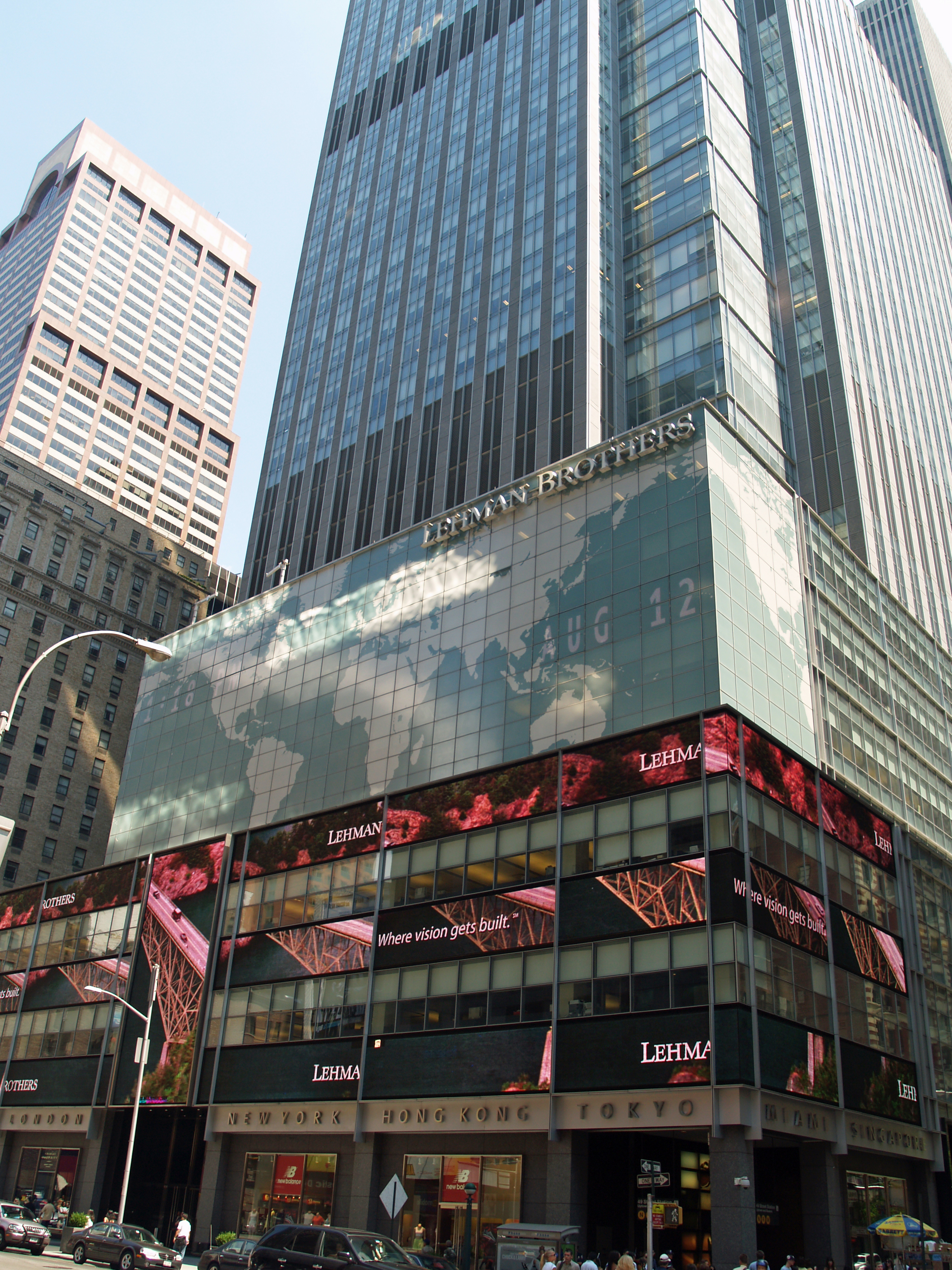
The bankruptcy of Lehman Brothers (headquarters pictured), the fourth-largest U.S. investment bank, on September 15, 2008, is often considered the climax of the 2008 financial crisis.

The term "recession pop" first gained prominence during the Great Recession and 2008 financial crash, a global financial crisis that significantly impacted economies worldwide. As individuals and communities grappled with unemployment, housing instability, and financial insecurity, popular music began to reflect these changes. Artists crafted songs characterized by a danceable sound and an emphasis on nightlife and partying, providing a sense of escapism, while others focused on themes of survival, frustration, sadness, and hope, often wrapped in an optimistic message.

Music journalists noted the popularity of dance tracks, particularly those with narratives about clubbing and feeling positive during hard times, in pop music in the early 2010s being seen as a response to the 2007–2008 financial crisis or 2012 phenomenon, with the colloquial term "recession pop" used to define the popular songs of this decade.

The Guardian stated that times of economic downturn or global recessions were categorized by an influx of upbeat, fun and happy dance-pop music:

"[...] when Pitbull and Kesha were massive – whenever there’s a recession, people party way more. If anyone wants to play a fun song, it’s usually from 2008."

Additionally, Vice described recession pop songs as "meant to be screamed along to, danced to, used as a soundtrack to a chaotic night out. To be a recession banger means to offer your listeners a place of escape within your music, turning every party into an extravagant, maximalist club experience even if you’re broke."

Some music critics argue that the genre reflects popular culture, music, and art during times of economic downturns drawing parallels between the Great Depression and the rise of swing and big band music in the 1920s-30s.

== Characteristics ==
Recession pop is characterized by its upbeat, infectious melodies as well as a party-laden, anthemic danceable sound. Features such as the use of the "millennial whoop", a vocal pattern that became popular in 2010s pop music, are also prominent. The genre frequently mixes elements of electronic dance music with synth-pop and electropop's heavy reliance on shimmering synthesizers, danceable beats, and lush production reminiscent of 1980s pop aesthetics. The genre is also primarily led by female artists and celebrates empowerment, optimism, and resilience.

Artists such as Sam Smith explored queer identity, with writers illustrating the parallels between queer pop and recession pop stating that "recession pop tended to be adopted by queer communities in hindsight." Other central themes of the genre include consumerism, drinking, sexuality, materialism, escapism, partying, and hedonism.

Additionally, the music often reflects the economic and emotional instability of its time, with introspective, socially conscious, or melancholic lyrics as seen in the music of Adele and Lana Del Rey, reflecting the tension capturing the cultural zeitgeist of financial crises and social uncertainty, while maintaining a polished, accessible sound that appeals to mainstream audiences. Paradoxically, songs such as "Like a G6" (2010) by Far East Movement, which featured Dev and The Cataracts, provided vicarious respite from economic insecurity through lyrics centered on materialistic opulence.

Notable examples of recession pop songs include "I Gotta Feeling" (2009) by the Black Eyed Peas and "Teenage Dream" (2010) by Katy Perry. The rise of recession pop is argued to be the response of the musical industry to the decreased state of general consumer spending wrought by the Great Recession. Record labels translated parallelly to cable networks in this era, with music channels such as MTV branding this new sound directly to consumers inflicted by economic hardship. This hence gave rise to a new generation of performers typified with high energy compositions and showmanship. Through this phenomenon, prominent artists during this era grew to stardom through chart-topping anthems considered as major contributors to recession pop such as Lady Gaga, Kesha, and Katy Perry.

== Background ==
There is a name for this new critical paradigm, "popism"—or, more evocatively (and goofily), "poptimism"—and it sets the old assumptions on their ear: pop (and, especially, hip-hop) producers are as important as rock auteurs, Beyoncé is as worthy of serious consideration as Bruce Springsteen, and ascribing shame to pop pleasure is itself a shameful act.

— Jody Rosen, May 2006

During the late 2000s, the decline of traditional genres like rock music, and the rise of electronic and pop-centric sounds, created a fertile ground for recession pop to emerge. The plunge of rock music's popularity on the Billboard charts coincided with the enormous rise of pop artists like Taylor Swift, signaling a new era of music criticism that favored poptimism over previously heralded rockism.

Poptimism argues that pop music can be as emotionally and socially significant as genres like rock or classical music, and it sought to challenge the perceived biases and hypermasculinity of rockism, which often involved privileging male over female artists. Music critic Kelefa Sanneh, writing in The New York Times in 2004, argued that rockism represented outdated sexist, racist, and homophobic points of view, defining rockism as "[...] idolizing the authentic old legend (or underground hero) while mocking the latest pop star; lionizing punk while barely tolerating disco; loving the live show and hating the music video; extolling the growling performer while hating the lip-syncher."

Around this time, publications like Pitchfork, Rolling Stone, and Vice began reviewing and celebrating pop music with the same rigor and seriousness traditionally reserved for indie or rock genres, with many other writers increasingly challenging the rock-centric lens of traditional music criticism.

== History ==
=== 2000s: Origins ===
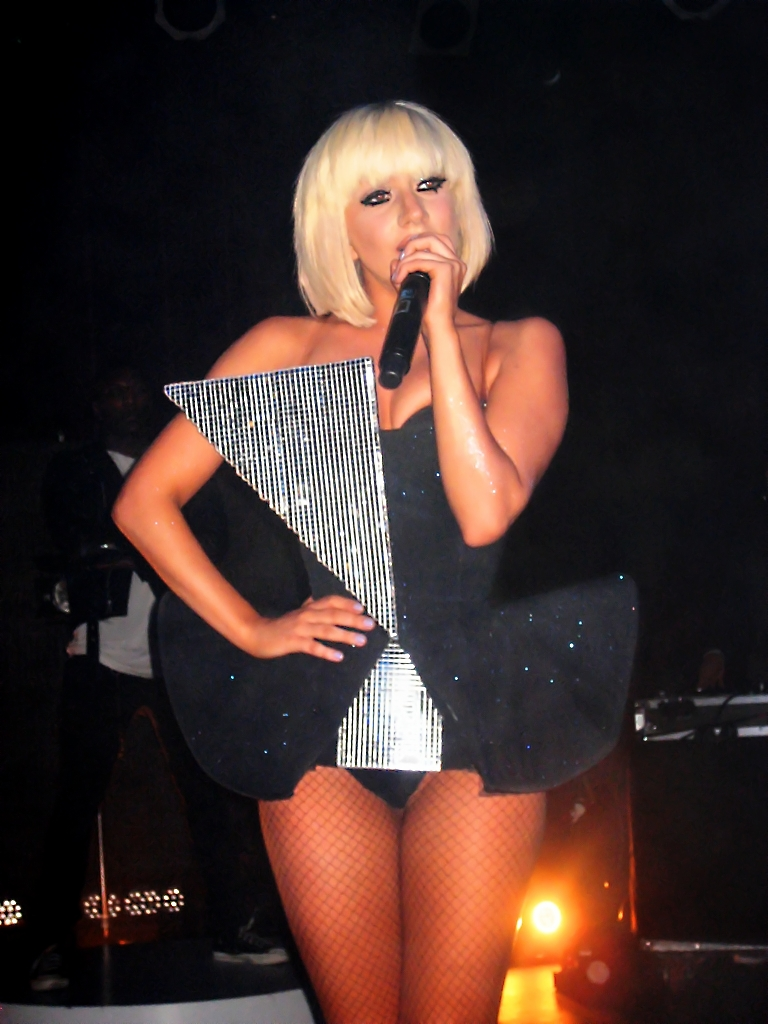
Lady Gaga performing during the Fame Ball Tour in March 2009

Lady Gaga released her debut album The Fame shortly after the 2008 financial crisis, while her lead single "Just Dance" implored listeners to "just dance / it's gonna be okay." Artists such as Britney Spears, Lady Gaga, Taylor Swift, Katy Perry, Madonna, Kesha, Christina Aguilera, Miley Cyrus, Usher, David Guetta, 3OH!3, Pitbull, and Rihanna also began releasing dance-pop and club party anthems in the aftermath of the financial crisis.

The term "recession pop" first appeared in a 2009 Irish Independent article on the effects of an economic downturn in Ireland on popular music. The article featured an interview with singer Lady Gaga, who agreed with the article's observations. The Fame (2008) was credited for its synth-pop songfulness satirizing the Great Recession, citing "Poker Face" inspired by gambling, with "LoveGame" inspired by receiving sexual attention at a nightclub, and "Just Dance" as a joyous-themed song appealing to people going through tough times in their life. The term was once used again in a 2012 Pitchfork article highlighting various singers and producers who left or had been dropped from their record labels, deeming them as independent musicians who were set to enter the mainstream media.

A precursor to the term in hip-hop was The Recession (2008), an album from rapper Jeezy that referenced the Great Recession in the United States. It became a political message in support for the 2008 presidential campaign for Barack Obama.

=== 2010s ===
The 2010s, similarly to the late 2000s, saw strong electronic influences present within dance-pop; there was also a strong emphasis on bass-heavy drum beats. Newer recording artists such as Ariana Grande, Justin Bieber, Rita Ora, and Dua Lipa joined the dance-pop charts within the decade. Poptimism played a role in elevating the critical status of artists associated with recession pop. For instance, Charli XCX, Robyn, and Lana Del Rey, who might once have been relegated to the realm of simply being "mainstream pop," were now being celebrated for their artistry and innovation.

==== Decline ====
More melancholic songs such as "Somebody That I Used to Know" (2011) by Goyte heralded a shift within pop, a trend cemented by Lorde's hit "Royals" released in 2013, which featured a more minimal production and lyrics focused on class commentary. By the late 2010s, recession pop started to lose popularity as mainstream pop artists such as Taylor Swift began moving away from danceable club songs in favor of more laid-back folk albums. Subsequently, artists like Harry Styles and Justin Bieber, whose music had previously been described as "generally lively", were now releasing songs that were described by Vice as "not really meant for the club," signaling a cultural shift in pop music toward a more downbeat trend. The decline of recession pop can also be linked to the growing rise of hip hop music in the mid-to-late 2010s, as it became the most popular genre in the United States.

=== 2020s: Revival ===
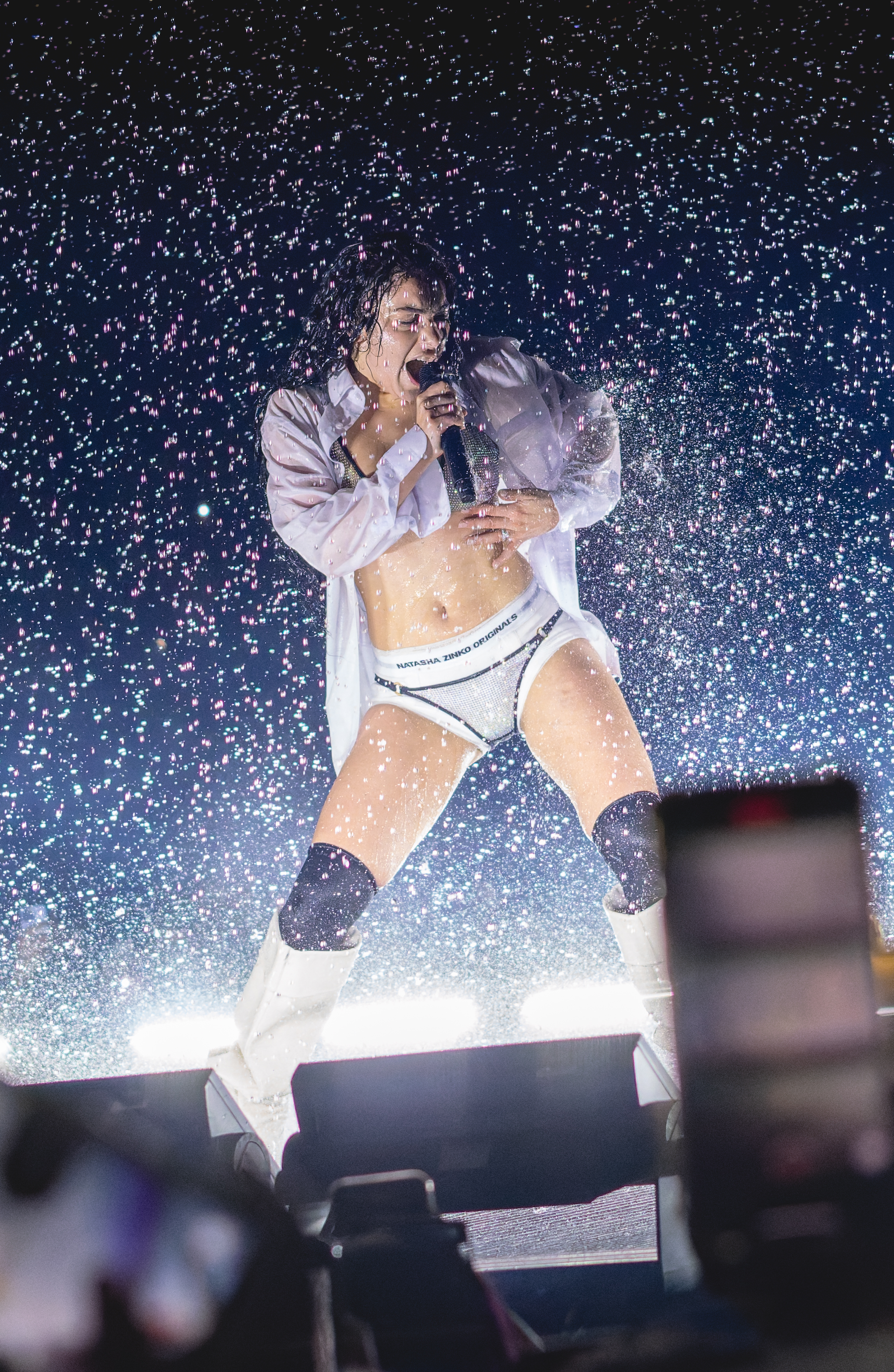
Charli XCX performing during the Brat Tour in November 2024

Amidst the early 2020s COVID-19 pandemic and global lockdowns, the dance-pop music of the recession pop era began to experience a revival. The economic instability, widespread unemployment, and social isolation caused by the pandemic created a cultural climate reminiscent of the Great Recession. Artists such as Sabrina Carpenter, Chappell Roan, and Charli XCX are credited as the main innovators in this new wave of recession pop. Other notable artists, such as Kesha with her single "Joyride" and Beyoncé, who with her album Renaissance, have helped revive the recession pop sound. "Recession pop" gained widespread recognition in 2024 after going viral on TikTok. In July 2024, interest in "recession pop" peaked, with Google searches reaching an all-time high.

Dazed stated that Chappell Roan's debut album The Rise and Fall of a Midwest Princess was responsible for "bringing [this] element of capitalism’s hardships and discrimination [to dance music] by discussing its depressive symptoms rather than its roots."

Charli XCX, known as one of the leading artists in the hyperpop movement, contributed significantly to the recession pop revival with her 2020 album How I'm Feeling Now, which was written and recorded during the COVID-19 lockdowns. Sabrina Carpenter's work explored themes of self-discovery and navigating personal crises, while Chappell Roan's music infused elements of queer identity and empowerment into the genre's framework.

The Guardian credited Charli XCX's album Brat, with its hedonistic and party-laden sound, as contributing to popularizing the resurgence of recession pop. The "Brat summer" social media trend further helped promote the album. Subsequently, music critics have also suggested that the rise of upbeat, danceable pop music post-COVID may be signaling an impending economic downturn into the late 2020s.

Vice outlined the term "recession banger" in a 2022 article by connecting viral dances and catchy lyricism from electronic dance music (EDM), which was derived from dance-pop in the late 1980s, and embraced dubstep in the early 2000s. The article applied the term to the album Renaissance (2022) by singer Beyoncé, which was inspired by the Ballroom scene and clubbing culture during the economic downturns in the 1970s. Canadian singer Carly Rae Jepsen endeavored to recreate the informal term in her 2022 song "The Loneliest Time" but was criticized by student newspaper the Brown Daily Herald by imperfecting "to replicate the club elements of 2010s pop music" for the album of the same name.

The commercial success of The Rise and Fall of a Midwest Princess (2023) and Brat (2024) marked career breakthroughs for singers Chappell Roan and Charli XCX. This made recession pop gain widespread recognition as retrospective nostalgia in 2024 through the social media platform TikTok. CNBC reported how the term provided a sense of optimism and escapism as the Great Recession took unemployment and inflation surging globally in 2008, notably in the United States and most Western countries. Beyoncé's 2022 single "Break My Soul", Troye Sivan's 2023 single "Rush", Charli XCX's 2024 single "360", Katy Perry's 2024 single "Woman's World", Kesha and T-Pain's 2025 single "Yippee-Ki-Yay", and Lady Gaga's 2025 single "Abracadabra" have been described as recession pop.

Data found that US on-demand audio streams of recession pop music from the late 2000s and early 2010s have increased 6.4% in 2025. It was revealed that recession pop music was outpacing the growth of the music industry at large.
