= Vendredi sur Mer =

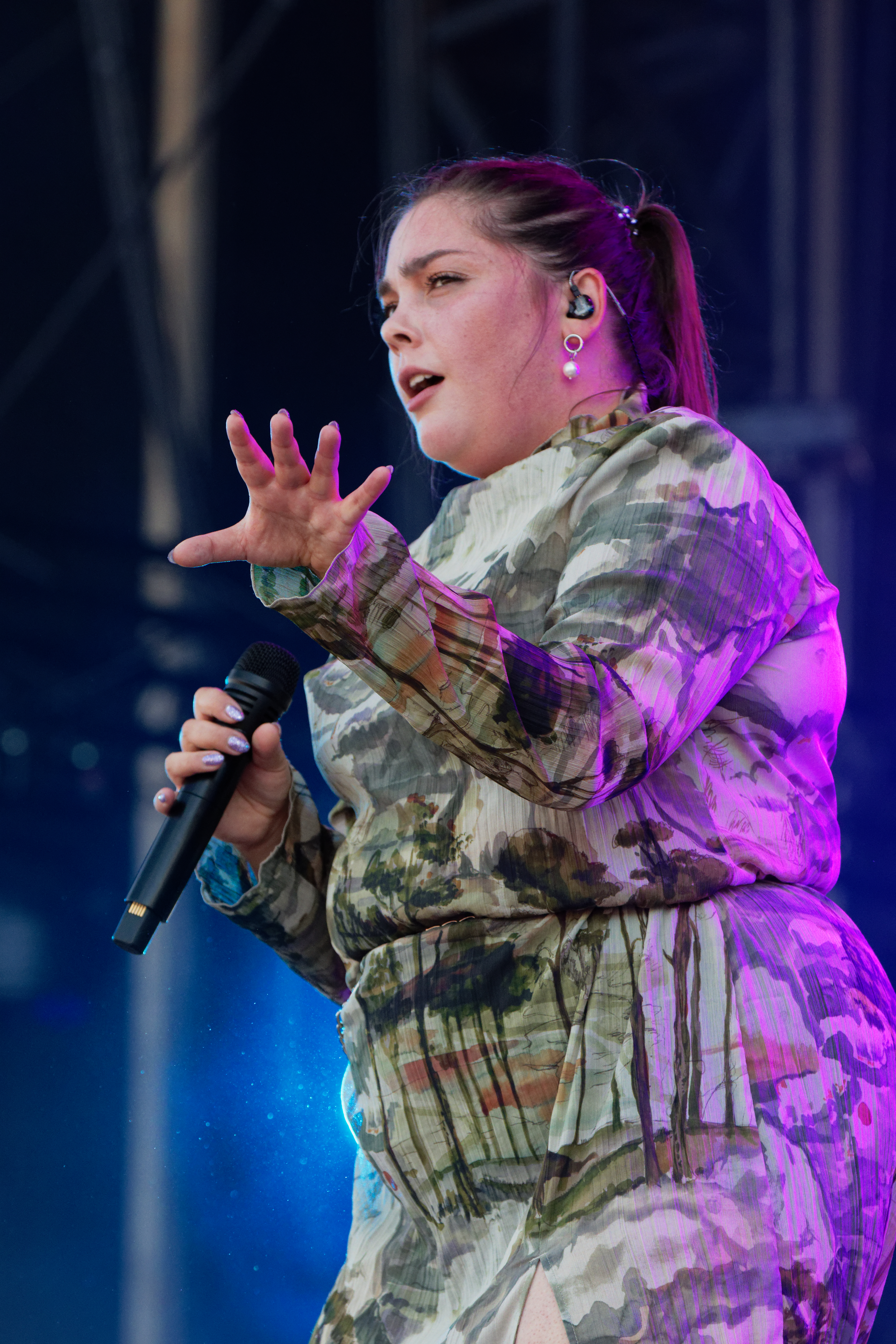
- Mignot in 2022
- Born: Charline Simone Rosemonde Mignot; 20 April 1995 (age 30); Geneva, Switzerland
- Other names: Vendredi sur Mer
- Occupations: Singer; songwriter; photographer
- Musical career
- Genres: Electropop, indie pop
- Labels: Profil de Face (2015 - 2021) Sony Music France (2021 - present)

Charline Simone Rosemonde Mignot (born 20 April 1995), better known as Vendredi sur Mer (French for "Friday by the Sea"), is a Swiss singer-songwriter and photographer.

== Biography ==
Charline Mignot was born in Romandy, a Francophone part of Switzerland, where she lived until she moved to Lyon where she attended an art school. She began her career as a photographer, notably working with the French luxury goods manufacturer, Hermès. Inspired by a meeting with her manager who appraised her homemade song made with a friend, she decided to take her first steps in the music industry. She settled in Paris and adopted a pseudonym Vendredi sur Mer. "I wanted a name that invites you to a voyage, to poetry, to reverie," she explained, adding that it's the sea that she draws most inspiration from.

Composed by Lewis OfMan, her first EP Marée basse was released in November 2017. In 2019, she released her first studio album called Premiers émois. She released her second studio album Métamorphose in 2022 and her third studio album Malabar Princess in April 2025.

== Reception ==
The cultural magazine PopMatters likened Mignot's work to that of the French band La Femme.

== Discography ==
=== Studio albums ===
List of studio albums, showing selected details, and selected chart positions
Title	Details	Peak chart positions			
Title	Details	SUI	SUI Rom.	BEL (WA)	FRA
Premiers émois	Released: March 22, 2019; Label: Profil de Face; Formats: CD, LP, digital download, streaming	42	15	167	58
Métamorphose	Released: March 18, 2022; Label: Sony Music Entertainment France; Formats: LP, digital download, streaming	—	—	—	—
Malabar Princess	Released: April 25, 2025; Label: Sony Music Entertainment France; Formats: LP, digital Download, streaming				
"—" denotes a recording that did not chart or was not released in that territory

=== Extended plays ===
List of extended plays, showing selected details
Title	Details	Notes
Marée basse	Released: November 24, 2017; Label: Profil de Face; Formats: CD, LP, digital download, streaming	—
Sextended versions	Released: July 1, 2022; Label: Sony Music Entertainment France; Formats: LP, digital download, streaming	Remix EP

=== Singles ===
==== As lead artist ====
List of singles, showing year and album
Title	Year	Album
Mort / Fine	2015	Non-album single
Écoute Chérie	2018	Premiers émois
Comment tu vas finir	2021	Métamorphose
Le Lac	2022	Métamorphose
Tout m'ennuie	2022	Métamorphose

==== As featured artist ====
List of featured singles, showing year and album
Title	Year	Album
I Wrote A Song (Mae Muller featuring Vendredi Sur Mer)	2023	Non-album single
