= Shy Boy (Carly Rae Jepsen song) =

2023 single by Carly Rae Jepsen

Single by Carly Rae Jepsen

from the album The Loveliest Time
- Released: June 23, 2023
- Studio: Studio 53 (London)
- Genre: Pop
- Length: 3:29
- Label: 604; Schoolboy; Interscope
- Songwriters: Carly Rae Jepsen; Ethan Gruska; Kyle Shearer; Nate Campany; Boaz Watson; June Williams; Ben Romans
- Producer: James Ford

Carly Rae Jepsen singles chronology
"Surrender My Heart" (2022)	"Shy Boy" (2023)	"More" (2026)

Visualizer
- "Shy Boy" on YouTube

"Shy Boy" is a song by Canadian singer-songwriter Carly Rae Jepsen. It was released on June 23, 2023, through 604, Schoolboy, and Interscope Records, as the lead single from her seventh studio album, The Loveliest Time (2023). Jepsen co-wrote the song with Ethan Gruska, Kyle Shearer, Nate Campany, Boaz Watson, June Williams, and Ben Romans, recording it at Studio 53 located in London. James Ford produced the song.

== Background and release ==
"Shy Boy" was released in June 2023, shortly after Jepsen headlined the West Hollywood Pride 2023 festival and announced a series of summer concerts in New York and Los Angeles. Around the same time, she was preparing to perform at the Glastonbury Festival, tour Japan in June and July, and join Boygenius for several dates on their North American tour.

== Composition ==
"Shy Boy" is a pop song that blends influences of disco, drawing from artists like Jessie Ware's album, That! Feels Good!. The song celebrates the excitement of encouraging a shy boy to come out of his shell on the dance floor, with lyrics like, "Shy boy stir me up / You didn't even know you got the Midas touch", while dismissing concerns about others' opinions. The track also includes subtle innuendo, with lines such as "Get a lil' somethin' for your morning cup".

== Critical reception ==
Harry Tafoya of Pitchfork described "Shy Boy" as a familiar offering from Jepsen, noting that it features "slices of weapons-grade '80s pop" that come alive with "muscular drum machines and spiraling Moroder synths". Consequence described the song as a "funky, romantic tune", with "playful vocals in between layers of wah-wah-clad chordal hits, synth melodies, and a bubbling bass line".

== Credits and personnel ==
Credits were adapted from the liner notes of The Loveliest Time.

=== Recording locations ===
- Recorded at: Studio 53; London
- Mixed at: The Trickery Mix Loft; Vancouver, Canada
- Mastered at: Nomograph Mastering

=== Personnel ===
- Carly Rae Jepsen – lead vocals, songwriter
- Ethan Gruska – songwriter
- Kyle Shearer – songwriter
- Nate Campany – songwriter
- Boaz Watson – songwriter
- June Williams – songwriter
- Ben Romans – songwriter
- James Ford – producer, recording, tracking, guitar, bass, drums, keyboards, synths
- Ruairi O'Flaherty – mastering
- Anthony Dolhai – mixing
- Rob Moose – strings

== Charts ==
Weekly chart performance
Chart (2023)	Peak position
Japan Hot Overseas (Billboard Japan)	5
