= So Right =

"So Right" may refer to:

- "So Right", a song by Carly Rae Jepsen from the 2023 album The Loveliest Time
- "So Right", a song by Dave Matthews Band from the 2001 album Everyday
- "So Right", a song by S Club 7, a B-side of the 1999 single "Bring It All Back"
