= Talking to Yourself =

Single by Carly Rae Jepsen

from the album The Loneliest Time
- Released: September 16, 2022
- Studio: Captain Cuts (Los Angeles)
- Genre: Dance-pop; synth-pop
- Length: 2:53
- Label: School Boy; Interscope
- Songwriters: Carly Rae Jepsen; Simon Wilcox; Benjamin Berger; Ryan Rabin
- Producer: Captain Cuts

Carly Rae Jepsen singles chronology
"Beach House" (2022)	"Talking to Yourself" (2022)	"The Loneliest Time" (2022)

Music video
- "Talking to Yourself" on YouTube

"Talking to Yourself" is a song by Carly Rae Jepsen from her sixth studio album, The Loneliest Time (2022). Jepsen wrote it with songwriter Simon Wilcox and its producers, Benjamin Berger and Ryan Rabin from the production team Captain Cuts. School Boy and Interscope Records released it as the album's third single on September 16, 2022. "Talking to Yourself" is a dance-pop and synth-pop song, in which Jepsen recalls a relationship with an ex-lover and wonders if he still has feelings for her.

"Talking to Yourself" received generally positive reviews from critics, who praised its production as catchy, comparing its lyrical themes to Jepsen's other music. It peaked at number eight on the Billboard Japan Hot Overseas Songs chart. The music video for "Talking to Yourself" was released alongside it. She included the song on the set list of her 2022–2023 concert tour, the So Nice Tour, and performed it at the Glastonbury Festival 2023.

== Background and release ==
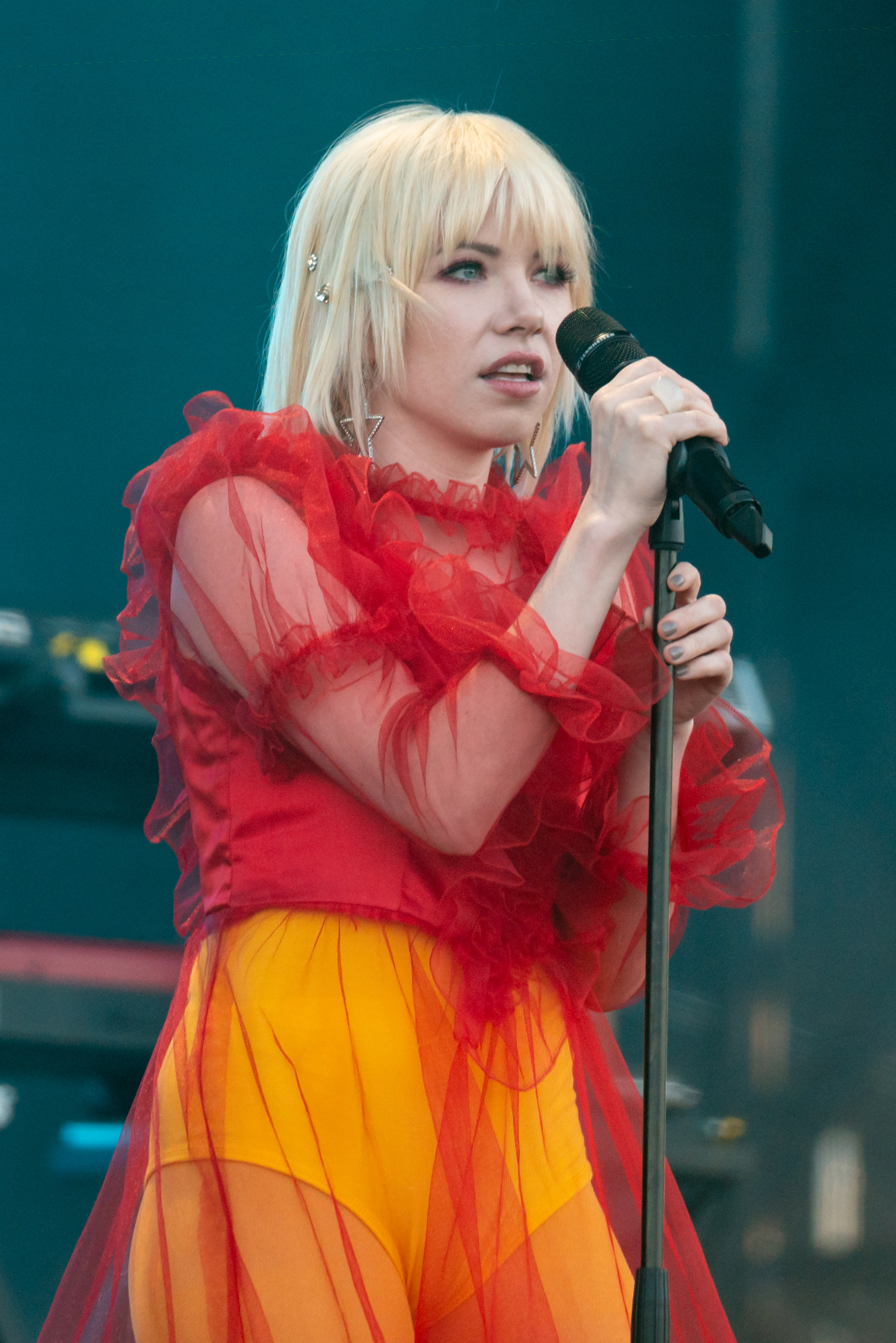
Carly Rae Jepsen in 2019

While on the Dedicated Tour, which ran from May 2019 to February 2020, Carly Rae Jepsen began collecting ideas for her sixth studio album. Her creativity was stimulated by lockdowns during the COVID-19 pandemic, and she transformed an old office space that was a part of her Los Angeles residence into a home studio. Jepsen endured problems in her personal life, being unable to join her family in Canada due to travelling restrictions, dealing with the death of her grandmother, and being newly single. She created more than 100 songs, eventually deciding on a track list of just 13. On August 1, 2022, Jepsen announced that the album, titled The Loneliest Time, would be released on October 21, 2022. It was preceded by the singles "Western Wind" and "Beach House" (both 2022), which were included on it.

Jepsen wrote "Talking to Yourself" alongside songwriter Simon Wilcox, and Benjamin Berger and Ryan Rabin from the production team Captain Cuts. On September 13, 2022, she shared a 17-second snippet of the song on social media and wrote that it would come out the following Friday so her fans could memorize the words before the So Nice Tour began. School Boy and Interscope Records released it along with a music video as the album's third single three days later. "Talking to Yourself" peaked at number eight on the Billboard Japan Hot Overseas Songs chart. The song was included on the set list of the So Nice Tour, and Jepsen performed it at the Glastonbury Festival 2023.

== Composition ==
"Talking to Yourself"
A dance-pop and synth-pop song with influences from the 1980s. Some critics described its chorus as "catchy".

"Talking to Yourself" is two minutes and 53 seconds long. Captain Cuts produced the song and recorded it at their namesake studio in Los Angeles, also handling engineering with Rob Kinelski and Eli Heisler; Berger and Wilcox provided programming. Trevor Rabin plays the guitar. Emily Lazar and Chris Allgood mastered it at the Lodge in New York City and Kinelski handled mixing at the Fortress of Amplitude in Los Angeles.

A dance-pop and synth-pop song with a strong beat and influences from 1980s music, "Talking to Yourself" includes a guitar solo, which "battles synth" according to Clash's Gem Stokes. Entertainment Weekly's Maura Johnston observed that warped 1980s guitar weaves through Jepsen's persistent vocals, succeeded by a piercing bass line and unwavering beat. Chris DeVille of Stereogum thought it kept with the 1980s pastiche of Jepsen's albums Emotion (2015) and Dedicated (2019), and Jeffrey Davies of PopMatters said it continued the shimmering and buoyant pop of her previous music. Peter Piatkowski from the same website described the style of "Talking to Yourself" as new wave.

In the lyrics of "Talking to Yourself", Jepsen recalls a relationship with an ex-lover and wonders if he still has feelings for her. She obsesses over him and thinks about the possibility that he is unable to sleep at night without her. Consequence's Mary Siroky believed the song's lyrics were ambiguous about whether the topic was a serious relationship, friends-with-benefits, or just an infatuation. According to Ben Kaye of the same website, it is "for those who come out on the winning side of a breakup".

== Critical reception ==
The song's production received generally positive reviews. Critics like Siroky and The A.V. Club's Gabrielle Sanchez believed "Talking to Yourself" has a catchy chorus. The former picked the track as "Song of the Week". Rolling Stone's Emily Zemler described it as a sanguine track and a "dance-pop anthem". American Songwriter critic Alli Patton and Kaye thought "Talking to Yourself" was suitable to dance to; Patton believed it complemented Jepsen's lively vocals, and Kaye said it struck the perfect balance between seductive and dance-floor-ready. Ben Devlin of MusicOMH named it the "first big hit" on The Loneliest Time's tracklist and compared its topline to the work of Divinyls. (Note: A topline is the melody and lyrics sung by a vocalist, which is layered atop the instrumental beat and can be heard if all instruments and background vocals are muted except the lead vocal track.) Writing for The Line of Best Fit, Sam Franzini cited "Talking to Yourself" among the pop treasures on the album and named it as one of Jepsen's most high-energy songs. On the other hand, Pitchfork's Olivia Horn wrote that the song sounds like "two different Dua Lipa outtakes cut-and-pasted together", using some diverting production flourishes.

Some critics commented on the lyrics of "Talking to Yourself", comparing its lyrical themes to Jepsen's other music. Siroky called the song unashamedly compulsive, and she opined it gives a voice to the "delightfully unhinged" while demonstrating Jepsen's pop sensibilities. Todd Dedman of Beats Per Minute thought it shared its concept of inconspicuousness in relationships with the Emotion track "When I Needed You". Writing for AllMusic, Heather Phares believed "Talking to Yourself" demonstrated feeling both detached and attached simultaneously, a running motif on The Loneliest Time, and Patton thought the lyrics realized the album's general theme of loneliness.

== Credits and personnel ==
Credits are adapted from the liner notes of The Loneliest Time.

- Captain Cuts – producer, engineering
- Carly Rae Jepsen – songwriter
- Simon Wilcox – songwriter, programming
- Benjamin Berger – songwriter, programming
- Ryan Rabin – songwriter
- Eli Heisler – engineering
- Trevor Rabin – guitar
- Emily Lazar – mastering
- Chris Allgood – mastering
- Rob Kinelski – mixing, engineering

== Charts ==
Chart position for "Talking to Yourself"
Chart (2022)	Peak position
Japan Hot Overseas (Billboard Japan)	8
