= Beach House (Carly Rae Jepsen song) =

2022 single by Carly Rae Jepsen

Single by Carly Rae Jepsen

from the album The Loneliest Time
- Released: August 5, 2022
- Genre: Pop; disco-pop
- Length: 2:30
- Label: Interscope; Schoolboy
- Songwriters: Carly Rae Jepsen; Alex Hope; Nate Cyphert
- Producer: Alex Hope

Carly Rae Jepsen singles chronology
"Move Me" (2022)	"Beach House" (2022)	"Talking to Yourself" (2022)

Music video
- "Beach House" on YouTube

"Beach House" is a song by Canadian singer Carly Rae Jepsen. It was released as the second single from her sixth studio album, The Loneliest Time, on August 5, 2022. Jepsen wrote the track with Alex Hope and Nate Cyphert, with Hope handling the production alongside SameSame, who is credited as an additional producer. A pop and disco-pop tune, "Beach House" is backed by upbeat guitar and synthesizer instrumentation. Inspired by Jepsen's displeasing experience, the track in its lyrics explores the uncertain and troubling side of finding love in dating apps; her character faces multiple misfortunes she had with the men that she dated and is overall exasperated because of them.

"Beach House" received generally positive reviews from critics, many of whom praised it for what they deemed catchy and playful lyrics and an engaging production. The song charted at number 11 on Billboard Japan's Hot Overseas Songs. Taylor Fauntleroy directed the accompanying music video, which features the events from the song set on a seaside. The song was included on the set list of her So Nice Tour (2022–2023).

== Background and release ==
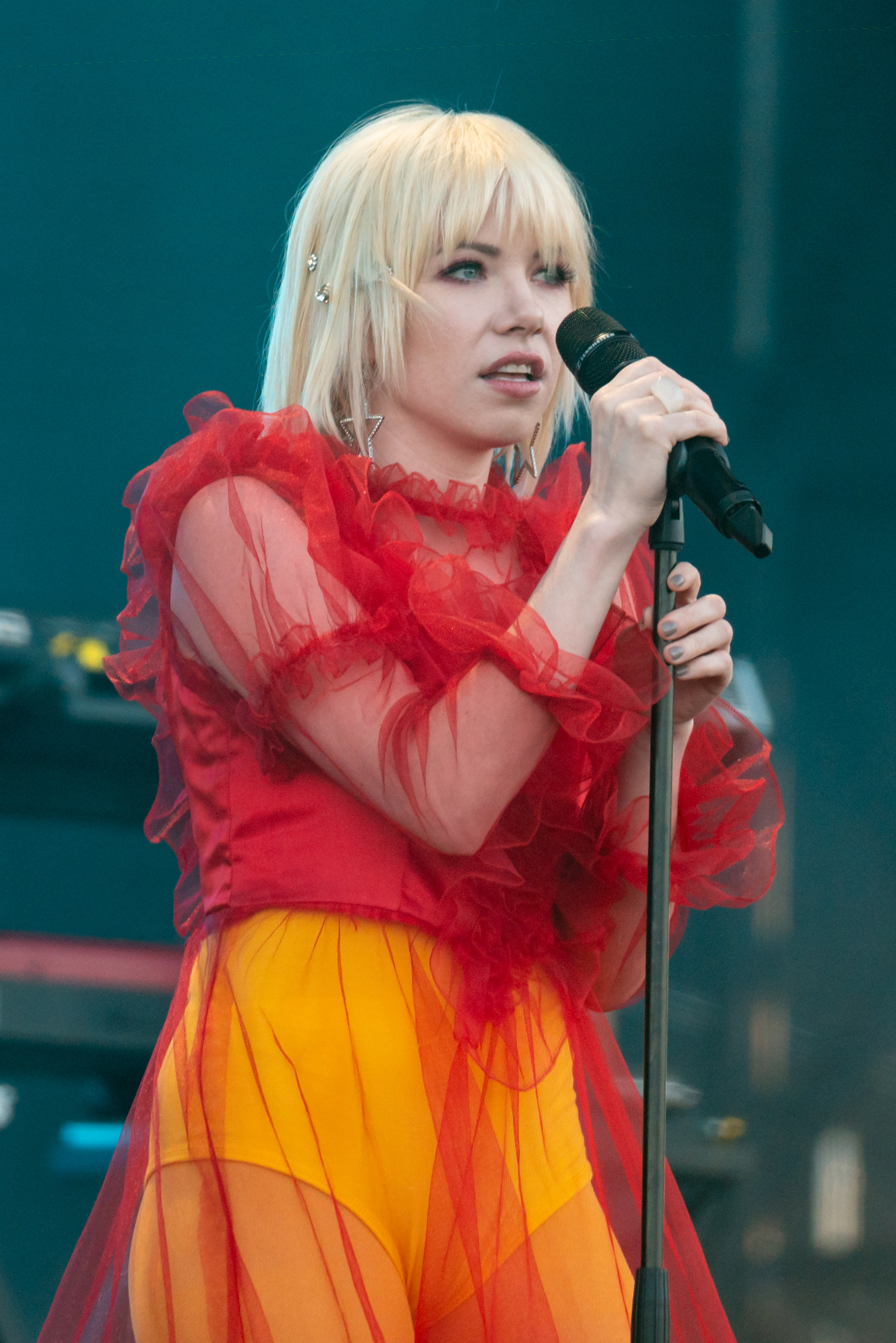
Carly Rae Jepsen in 2019

In February 2020, Carly Rae Jepsen began collecting ideas for her sixth studio album, The Loneliest Time, while on her Dedicated Tour (2019–2020). Her creativity was stimulated by the COVID-19 pandemic, leading her to transform an old office space that was a part of her Los Angeles residence into a home studio. On August 1, 2022, Jepsen announced the album, which was preceded by the lead single "Western Wind" earlier in May.

Jepsen was inspired to write "Beach House" after someone invited her to his Malibu beach house for dinner prior to revealing that he already had a girlfriend. Feeling displeased but also reinvigorated, Jepsen brought the song to a studio session with Alex Hope and Nate Cyphert the next day: "I've got a concept! The hook is going to say, 'I've got a beach house in Malibu, and I'm probably going to hurt your feelings". They were confused before she explained that it was about dating apps. Jepsen co-wrote the song alongside Hope and Cyphert, with Hope handling the production with SameSame, who is credited as an additional producer.

Jepsen teased "Beach House" by sharing its hook on Twitter in January 2022. On August 4, 2022, she posted a 15-second snippet of the song on TikTok. The song was released as the album's second single the next day and its music video, directed by Taylor Fauntleroy, was released on August 12. Filmed in Malibu, the video is set on a seaside and depicts the "nightmare dates" that were presented on the song. "Beach House" reached number 11 on Billboard Japan's Hot Overseas Songs issued on August 31, 2022. It is listed at track number six on The Loneliest Time, which was released on October 21 by Interscope and Schoolboy Records. The song was included on the set list of her fourth concert tour, the So Nice Tour (2022–2023).

== Music and lyrics ==
"Beach House" is two and a half minutes long. Hope and Rob Cohen programmed the song, while Mitch McCarthy recorded and mixed it. Background vocals were provided by Cyphert, Ben Romans, Bobby Wooten, Jared Manierka, Joey Hendricks, and Tony Marino. Chris Allgood and Emily Lazar mastered the track.

The upbeat instrumentation of "Beach House" comprises a synthesizer and a guitar both played by Hope, with an upbeat disco bassline. The song includes a group of male backing vocalists to sing "I got a beach house in Malibu and I'm probably gonna hurt your feelings". Peter Piatkowski of PopMatters described the song "funky" and disco-pop, while Hannah Mylrea from NME said that it was "disco-infused". Other critics considered the track pop.

The lyrics are about the uncertain and troubling side of finding love in dating apps. In the verses, Jepsen describes going through a cycle of misfortunes she experienced with "Boy No. 1" to "Boy No. I Can't Keep Count Anymore". The chorus sees her pleading for a timeline where people are honest when dating: "I want to believe that when you chase a girl, it's not just hunting season". Later in the song, Jepsen encounters men who plan to ghost her, borrow money, and harvest her organs. The track also expresses her frustration with the numerous unsuccessful dates she had: "I've been on this ride / This rollercoaster's a carousel / And I'm getting nowhere". Piatkowski likened the lyrics to Carly Simon's song "You're So Vain" (1972). Gabrielle Sanchez of The A.V. Club said that its themes are comparable to her other tracks like "Call Me Maybe" (2011) and "Store" (2016).

== Critical reception ==
"Beach House" received generally positive reviews—many critics such as Jodi Guglielmi of Rolling Stone and Sam Franzini of The Line of Best Fit deemed the song catchy and playful. Lindsay Zoladz of The New York Times stated that it was a "cheeky earworm" that displayed her "deadpan sense of humor". Time Out placed "Beach House" at number 11 in their year-end list of the 22 best songs of 2022, with Phil de Semlyen describing the track as a "zippy, witty, stupidly catchy takedown of terrible dates". Piatkowski lauded the "mordant comedy" of "Beach House" and said that the song "doesn't feel like a novelty tune" due to the songwriting and production quality. Heather Phares of AllMusic wrote that the track was the most surprising from The Loneliest Time and that it encapsulated "the wasteland of dating in the early 2020s with humor, horror, and just a bit of cynicism". Audra Heinrichs from The Telegraph called it a "cynical good time".

The Rolling Stone writer Rob Sheffield described the song as a "deliciously nasty tour of serial monogamy in the era of dating-app addiction". Entertainment Weekly's journalist Maura Johnston called the track "withering" and selected it as one of the album's tracks that featured "propulsive throwdowns brimming with bite and verve". Sanshez said that although Jepsen approached "corniness" on the song, "she's so earnest about it" to the point that it was very engaging. Charles Lyons-Bert from Slant Magazine stated that the track was a "winning confection" that displayed Jepsen's "unique appeal" of being naive while also cunning. A few of them also found emotional nuance within the lyrics: Zoladz noted that "Beach House" effectively showcased themes of yearning for a romantic relationship, while Piatkowski perceived a sense of "weariness and stoic familiarity" to it. On less positive reviews, Pitchfork's Olivia Horn felt that the track was "corny and dated" and too derivative for Jepsen, but she believed that it was an attempt to "diversify her portfolio". Gem Stokes of Clash wrote that the song was witty and a "definitive bop", but found it to be a "superficial" outlier compared to the rest of the album.

Critics also commended the production. Some of them regarded "Beach House" as anthemic, breezy, and lively. Mylrea stated that the song was "phenomenal" and a "fully blown disco-infused banger". Piatkowski thought the track was an "excellent contrast" to the "sun-dappled tenderness" of "Western Wind" and selected it as a highlight from The Loneliest Time. Rhian Daly of UDiscoverMusic described the song as a "dance-ready anthem". Robin Murray from Clash called it a "breezy summer anthem" with an energetic performance from Jepsen. Chris Thiessen from Under the Radar believed that the track was a "summery jam" and that it was the most fun song on the album.

== Personnel ==
Credits are adapted from the liner notes of The Loneliest Time.

- Carly Rae Jepsen – lead vocals, songwriter
- Alex Hope – songwriter, producer, guitar, synthesizer, programming
- Nate Cyphert – songwriter, backing vocals
- SameSame – additional producer
- Ben Romans – backing vocals
- Bobby Wooten – backing vocals
- Jared Manierk – backing vocals
- Joey Hendricks – backing vocals
- Tony Marino – backing vocals
- Rob Cohen – programming
- Mitch McCarthy – recording and mixing engineer
- Chris Allgood – mastering engineer
- Emily Lazar – mastering engineer

== Charts ==
Chart performance for "Beach House"
Chart (2022)	Peak position
Japan Hot Overseas (Billboard Japan)	11
