= Stadium Love =

"Stadium Love" may refer to:

- "Stadium Love", a song by Carly Rae Jepsen from the 2023 album The Loveliest Time
- "Stadium Love", a song by Metric from the 2009 album Fantasies
