= Coco & Clair Clair =

American pop rap duo

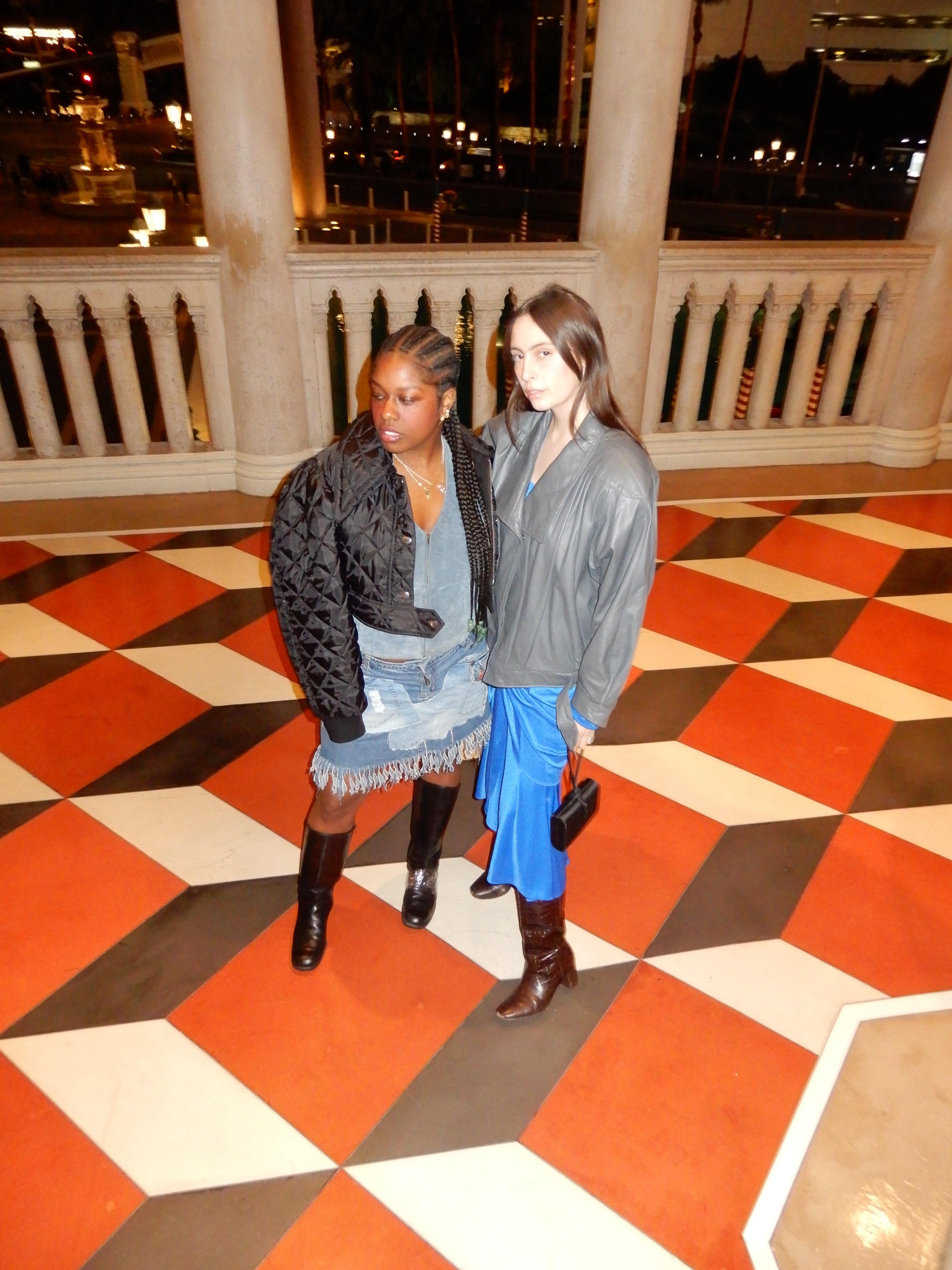
- Coco (left) and Clair Clair in May 2023.

Background information
- Origin: Atlanta, Georgia, United States
- Genre: Alternative hip hop
- Years active: 2014–present
- Members: Taylor Nave; Claire Toothill

Coco & Clair Clair are an American alternative hip hop duo from suburban Atlanta, Georgia, founded by Taylor Nave and Claire Toothill in late 2013. Their first mixtape, Posh, was released in May 2017.

Between 2020 and 2021, the duo released several singles, including "Pop Star" in December 2020 and "TBTF" in September 2021. In February 2022, they featured on Lewis OfMan's "Misbehave," which Billboard compared to a Kesha-inspired track set in the Emily in Paris universe. The song appeared on OfMan's album Sonic Poems, released the same day.

Sexy, their debut studio album, was released in November 2022. The album received positive reviews, including a 7.4 rating from Pitchfork. A deluxe edition with remixes by artists such as Empress Of and Chaeyoung of Twice followed in 2023, alongside their cover of Wham!'s "Last Christmas." Their second album, Girl, was released in August 2024.

== Career ==
Claire Toothill met Taylor Nave on Twitter in late 2013. Both Toothill and Nave were born and raised in the suburbs outside of Atlanta, GA. They released a track on SoundCloud and shortly after, decided to pursue music together professionally. In 2017, they released their debut project, Posh. Shortly after, Toothill moved to New York City but the duo continued working on music. In the same year, they released the singles "Pretty", which later became successful on TikTok, and "Crushcrushcrush".

In September 2019, they appeared alongside Clairo on Deaton Chris Anthony's track "Racecar" for which a music video was released. During the COVID-19 pandemic, Toothill moved back to Atlanta and Nave graduated from college, which allowed the duo to focus on music full-time. In April 2020, they released their second EP, Treat Like Gold, which includes the track "Wishy Washy", for which a music video was released in September 2020. In October 2022, the song was used in the fifth episode of the fourth season of Atlanta.

Between 2020 and 2021, the duo continued to release a handful of singles and provide features for other artists. "Pop Star", an ode to life as a musician, was released in December 2020 followed by "TBTF" in September 2021. In February 2022, they featured on Lewis OfMan's "Misbehave", which Billboard likened to a version of Kesha's "Tik Tok" shot in the Emily in Paris universe, and which appeared on OfMan's album Sonic Poems, which was released in the same day.

In September 2022, the pair announced their debut album Sexy with the release of their single "Cherub". The following month, they released the album's second single "Love Me". In November 2022, they released the twelve-track album Sexy, which featured "Pop Star", "TBTF", "Cherub", "Love Me", and "The Hills (feat. Deela)". The album received positive reviews. Pitchfork gave the album a 7.4, noting that Coco & Clair Clair coalesce and subvert trends with ease. In November 2023, they released a deluxe version of the album that features remixes of each track from artists like Empress Of, Chaeyoung from the K-pop group Twice, and George Daniel of The 1975. Later in November 2023, they released a cover of Wham!'s "Last Christmas".

== Discography ==
=== Mixtapes ===
- Posh (2017)

=== EPs ===
- Treat Like Gold (2020)

=== Studio albums ===
- Sexy (2022)
- Girl (2024)

=== Singles ===
==== As lead artist ====
Title	Year	Album
"Rosé" (feat. Fit of Body)	2015	Non-album single
"Knife Play" (feat. Slug Christ)	2015	Non-album single
"Silk and Wine (529)" (feat. Lord Narf)	2015	Non-album single
"Water" (feat. Slug Christ)	2016	Non-album single
"Pretty" (feat. Okthxbb)	2017	Non-album single
"Crushcrushcrush" (feat. Paul Maxwell)	2017	Non-album single
"Naomi & Kate" (feat. Okthxbb)	2018	Non-album single
"Sunnyside" (feat. Isabella Lovestory & Paul Maxwell)	2018	Non-album single
"Atlanta Girls (Coco Freestyle)"	2019	Non-album single
"Bugs"	2019	Non-album single
"Smash Hit"	2020	Non-album single
"U + Me"	2020	Non-album single
"Pop Star"	2020	Sexy
"TBTF"	2021	Sexy
"Cherub"	2022	Sexy
"Love Me"	2022	Sexy
"The Hills (feat. Deela)" (George Daniel remix)	2023	Sexy (deluxe version)
"Pop Star" (Chaeyoung remix)	2023	Sexy (deluxe version)
"Last Christmas"	2023	Non-album single

==== As featured artist ====
Title	Year	Album
"Cloud Nine" (Cowgirl Clue feat. Coco & Clair Clair)	2019	Icebreaker
"Racecar" (Deaton Chris Anthony feat. Clairo, Coco & Clair Clair)	2019	Bo Y
"Misbehave" (Lewis OfMan feat. Coco & Clair Clair)	2022	Sonic Poems
