= Écoute Chérie =

Single by Vendredi sur Mer

from the album Premiers émois
- Released: October 3, 2018
- Recorded: 2017
- Genre: Synth-pop; nu-disco; indie pop
- Length: 3:47
- Label: Profil de Face; Sony Music France
- Songwriter: Charline Mignot
- Producer: Lewis Delhomme

Vendredi sur Mer singles chronology
"Écoute Chérie" (2018)	"Chewing-gum" (2018)

Music video
- "Écoute Chérie" on YouTube

"Écoute Chérie" is a song by Vendredi sur Mer. It was released on 3 October 2018.

== Charts ==
Chart performance for "Écoute Chérie"
Chart (2018)	Peak position
Belgium (Ultratip Bubbling Under Wallonia)	25
France Singles Sales Charts (SNEP)	165
