= Lewis OfMan =

French musician (born 1997)

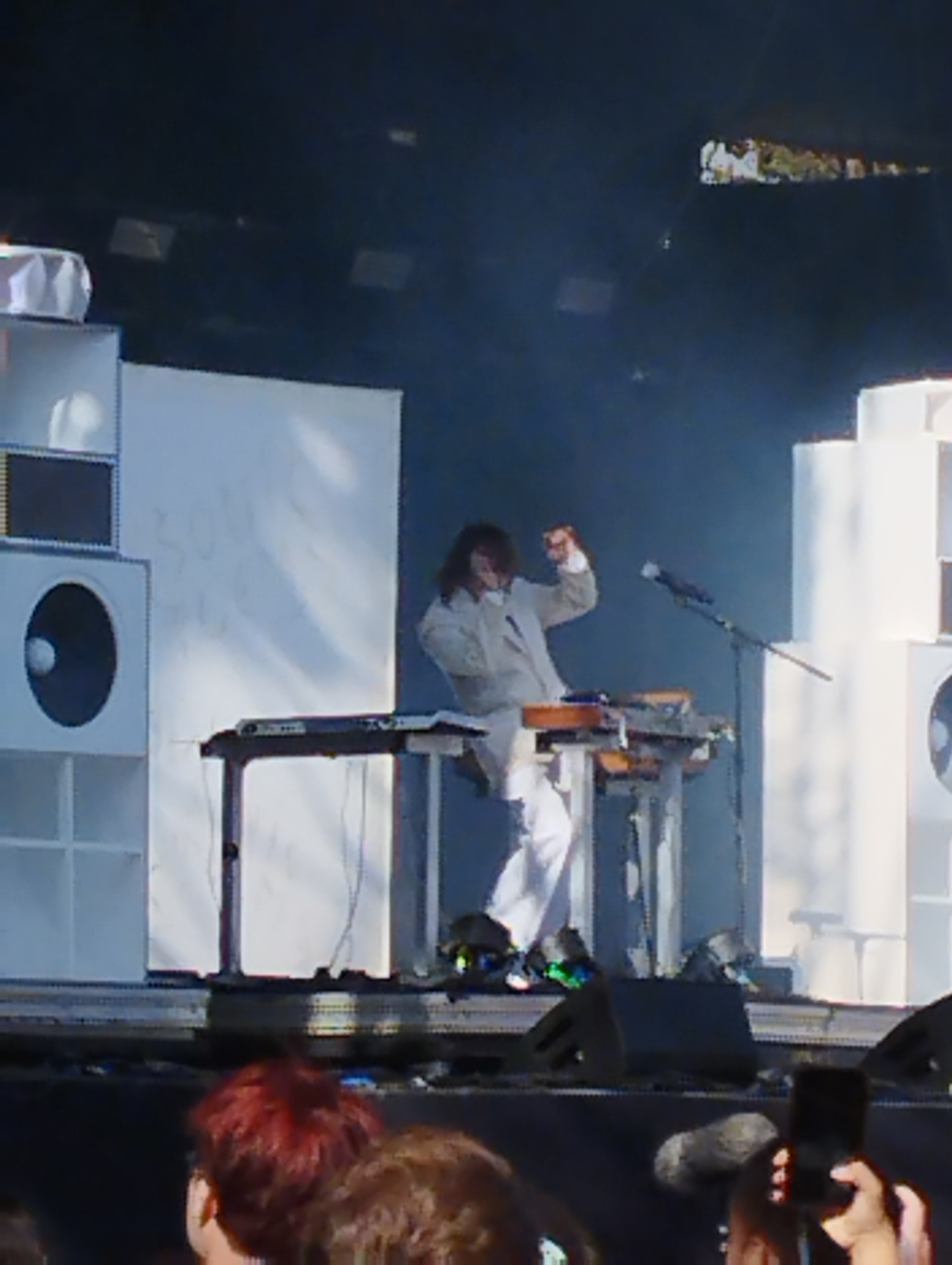
- Lewis OfMan performing in 2022

Background information
- Born: Lewis Pierre Simon Delhomme; December 1, 1997 (age 28)
- Origin: Paris, Île-de-France; France
- Genres: Pop, synth-pop, french pop electronic, dance
- Occupations: Musician; record producer; singer; songwriter
- Instruments: Drums; keyboard; synthizer; guitar
- Years active: 2014–present
- Labels: Profil de Face; Cactus Club
- Website: lewisofman.store

Lewis Pierre Simon Delhomme, known professionally as Lewis OfMan, is a French record producer, musician, singer and songwriter from Paris, France. He's currently signed to French independent record label, Profil de Face.

To date, he has released three EP's, Disconsolate (2014), Yo Bene (2017), and Dancy Party (2021), and two studio albums, Sonic Poems (2022) and Cristal Medium Blue released February 9, 2024.

Over the course of his career, Delhomme has collaborated with the likes of Rejjie Snow, Vendredi sur Mer, Empress Of, Coco & Clair Clair to name a few, but is best known for his collaborative single, Move Me with Canadian singer Carly Rae Jepsen, released July 15, 2022.

== Life and career ==
=== Early life ===
Lewis Pierre Simon Delhomme is from Paris, and has two siblings, Camille and Joseph, who are much older than him. His father, Jean-Philippe Delhomme, is an artist who created a series of advertisements for Barneys New York in the 1990s, his uncle, Benoît Delhomme, was a cinematographer who worked on films The Scent of Green Papaya (1993) and Cyclo (1995), their grandfather, Georges Delhomme, helped create Lancôme and spent 29 years with the firm, and Lewis' mother, Sophie-Anne, spent time as the artistic director of Courrier International.

Growing up, he wanted to be a perfumer, but found it too mathematical, and spent much of his childhood on Sophie-Anne's phone, which contained a number of video games, including a rudimentary digital audio workstation. He then spent a period in New York, at which, aged eleven, he learned to play the drums; upon his return to Paris, he became the drummer for a band, the Jools, before buying himself a keyboard the following year. He then began composing works on Sophie-Anne's iPad using GarageBand, and his first EP, the Bandcamp-exclusive Disconsolate, was produced using the software.

=== Career ===
SoundCloud, when you upload a track, it asks for the artist name and I was like, "Woah, what's my artist name?" I remembered my brother was playing this soccer video game where you create your own soccer player and he had our last name, which is Delhomme, on there in Español, which would make it, "Del Hombre." And he was like, "You know, in English, it's cool too. It's OfMan." And I was like, "Lewis OfMan, that's a cool name."

— OfMan in October 2022

Delhomme adopted the Lewis OfMan moniker around 2014; SoundCloud had asked him what his artist name was, and he remembered that his brother had played a soccer video game in which his surname appeared in Spanish as "Del Hombre", prompting him to mention in passing that its English translation was "Of Man". That year, he released his second EP, Yo Bene, and later that year, he produced Vendredi sur Mer's debut album Marée Basse. In 2021, he released another EP, Dancy Party, and the following year he released Misbehave, a collaboration with Coco & Clair Clair, which Billboard likened to a version of Kesha's "Tik Tok" shot in the Emily in Paris universe; the song appeared on Delhomme's album Sonic Poems, which was released the same day and was co-produced with Tim Goldsworthy, and contained eighteen voice notes. He then released the single Nails Matching My Fit featuring Shanae, and in July 2022, he released Move Me, a collaboration with Carly Rae Jepsen, who had discovered Delhomme in September 2020 after a friend sent her a playlist; in an October 2022 interview with Paper, Delhomme stated that he wrote the song while living in Florence after spending a "special night" with someone, and that he wrote the track the day before a session with Jepsen. In February 2023, Delhomme supported Jepsen on several shows on her The So Nice Tour.

In October 2022, he released a remix of Superorganism's On & On, which later appeared on World Wide Pop – Reeeemix!, a remix album based on the band's World Wide Pop. In June 2023, Delhomme released Highway, a collaboration with Empress Of, alongside a music video shot in Los Angeles and directed by Écoute Chérie, Delhomme's visual collaborator. The song came about after Delhomme met Empress Of in Los Angeles, set up a session with her, and used it to burn off a demo he had started while on holiday in Greece while listening to the psychedelic rock he was listening to as a teenager and 1970s Brazilian music such as Jorge Ben and Quarteto em Cy.

In November 2023, he released the single, Hey Lou, which Delhomme had also written in Greece, and which was a collaboration with Parisian singer Camille Jansen, with whom Delhomme had previously worked on her Louise EP in 2019; the song sampled a choir, as Delhomme was listening to Leonard Cohen's song So Long, Marianne and Death of a Ladies' Man at the time, and was released alongside a music video shot by Pierre Auroux at Antelope Valley California Poppy Reserve.

== Artistry ==
Writing in June 2023, Rachel Brodsky of Stereogum described his music as synth-pop. In an April 2017 interview with W, he stated that he was "really inspired" by Frank Ocean, Ennio Morricone, Lee Fields, and Jamie xx, further elaborating that:

Frank Ocean is the greatest artist I ever known, his way to create is incredible, all the contrasts and mysteries you can find in his music are very interesting, I really love his album Blonde and ever more the video album Endless, which is for me an incredible performance of talent and standards exit. Ennio Morricone, with his melodies, his choice of chords and sounds which are perfect, guides me a lot. Lee Fields have a special mood in his songs that I love, a really good energy that gladdens what you are doing at the moment you are listening to it. Finally, Jamie XX, because I feel in his music a huge part of spontaneity and sincerity, just groove and sounds experiment, I love that, he is not following a movement or something he really has his sound, and this is the artist goal for me.

Under the name Lewis OfMan, he is since December 2023 on tour in France, Belgium, in the United States, Mexico and as well in Canada to promote his latest album Cristal Medium Blue.

== Discography ==
=== Studio albums ===
- Sonic Poems (2022)
- Cristal Medium Blue (2024)
- 50KWTTS (2026)

=== EPs ===
- Disconsolate (2014)
- Yo Bene (2017)
- Dancy Party (2021)

=== Singles ===
==== As lead artist ====
Title	Year	Album
"Flash"	2018	Yo Bene
"Plein de bisous" (featuring Milena Leblanc)	2018	Non-album single
"Attitude"	2020	Dancy Party
"Dancy Boy"	2020	Dancy Party
"Orphéon"	2021	Non-album single
"Boom Boom"	2021	Sonic Poems
"Too Much Text"	2022	Sonic Poems
"Misbehave" (featuring Coco & Clair Clair)	2022	Sonic Poems
"Nails Matching My Fit" (featuring Shanae)	2022	Non-album singles
"Move Me" (featuring Carly Rae Jepsen)	2022	Non-album singles
"Highway" (featuring Empress Of)	2023	Cristal Medium Blue
"Frisco Blues"	2023	Cristal Medium Blue
"Hey Lou" (featuring Camile Jensen)	2023	Cristal Medium Blue
"Get Fly (I Wanna)" (featuring Gabriela Richardson)	2024	Cristal Medium Blue

==== Remixes ====
Title	Year	Artist(s)
"Summertime Sadness" (Lewis OfMan Remix)	2015	Lana Del Rey
"Un Mec En Or" (Lewis OfMan Remix)	2016	The Pirouettes
"Qui es-tu?" (Lewis OfMan Remix)	2016	Poom
"Housse de Racket" (Lewis OfMan Remix)	2016	Le Rayon Vert
"Swamp" (Lewis OfMan Remix)	2016	Futuro Pelo
"La piscine" (Lewis OfMan Remix)	2017	Hypnolove
"Pondikonissi" (Lewis OfMan Remix)	2017	aglaska
"Sao Paulo" (Lewis OfMan Remix)	2017	Julia Jean-Baptiste
"Romeo" (Lewis OfMan Remix)	2017	Yelle
"In your beat" (Lewis OfMan Remix)	2019	Django Django
"Joy in repetition" (Lewis OfMan Remix)	2019	Keziah Jones
"When trouble sleep yanga wke am" (Lewis OfMan Remix)	2019	Keziah Jones
"Goodbye soleil" (Lewis OfMan Remix)	2019	Phoenix
"Beautiful" (Lewis OfMan Remix)	2020	Rhye
"TXU TXU" (Lewis OfMan Houseparty Remix)	2022	PPJ
"On & On" (Lewis OfMan Remix)	2022	Superorganism
"Bad Lil Vibe" (Lewis OfMan Remix)	2023	Coco & Clair Clair
