= The Loveliest Time =

Studio album by Carly Rae Jepsen
- Released: July 28, 2023
- Recorded: 2020–2022
- Length: 43:34
- Labels: 604; Schoolboy; Interscope
- Producers: Cole M.G.N.; Ethan Gruska; Jack & Coke; James Ford; John Hill; Jordan Palmer; Kyle Shearer; Lewis OfMan; Patrik Berger; Oliver Lundström; Rostam Batmanglij

Carly Rae Jepsen chronology
The Loneliest Time (2022)	The Loveliest Time (2023)	Day and Night (2026)

Singles from The Loveliest Time
- 1. "Shy Boy" Released: June 23, 2023

The Loveliest Time is the seventh studio album by Canadian singer Carly Rae Jepsen, released on July 28, 2023, through 604, Schoolboy and Interscope Records. It serves as a companion piece to The Loneliest Time (2022), featuring songs from recording sessions for that album. The album was preceded by the lead single, "Shy Boy". It reached the top fifty of the Scottish Albums Chart.

== Background ==
In February 2020, while embarking on The Dedicated Tour, Jepsen began collecting ideas for her sixth studio album. Her creativity was stimulated by the COVID-19 pandemic, prompting her to transform an old office space in her Los Angeles residence into a home studio. The recording sessions for what would become The Loneliest Time produced over 65 B-sides, which Jepsen told her A&R representative that she "could make something of."

In July 2023, nine months after the release of The Loneliest Time, Jepsen confirmed that a "B-side" companion album would be released. The singer previously released "B-side" albums Emotion: Side B and Dedicated Side B, which featured songs recorded during sessions for their respective "A-side" albums. In an interview with Variety, Jepsen explained the decision to make another "B-side" album without including it in the album title:

Since doing this B-sides offering, from Emotion to Dedicated to now, I really leaned into it being one of the most exciting processes for me. The B-sides territory is this expansive world where I can play in all directions. [...] I knew by this time, [when] I made The Loneliest Time that The Loveliest Time was coming. The Loneliest Time Side B just sounds like a downer. It was already quite a weighted thing to call something like The Loneliest Time, but The Loneliest Time Side B, I just couldn't do it.

== Composition and themes ==
I didn't want it to just be as simple as a dark and a light. We're not as simple as that as humans. [...] It's more about stepping into the experience of being alive and coming out from that state of hibernation and then loneliness. [...] There are so many flowers in a lot of my images because I like the idea of planting yourself in this clean dirt, and from this, a beautiful growth can happen. I want it to like feel like growth and sound like celebration. Those were the main concepts for me. [...] A lot of the songs were written from a place where I still hadn't met anybody I was that excited about; it was this longing for that. It's been a weird thing of life imitating art because I feel like I've written all these experiences that now in real life I'm getting to have and it's odd to have it be written first and then kind of happen afterwards.

— Carly Rae Jepsen on The Loveliest Time

The project featured production credits from Rostam Batmanglij and James Ford. Batmanglij shared that the material he had contributed was upbeat, tweeting, "The two we did for The Loveliest Time have BPMs—get ready to dance." Jepsen said that the album was "sort of the completion to The Loneliest Time", adding that the songs were inspired by "fantasies" about being able to "travel again and fall madly in love and live life like it's an adventure."

== Critical reception ==
The Loveliest Time ratings
Aggregate scores
Source	Rating
Metacritic	79/100
Review scores
Source	Rating
AllMusic	4/5 stars
Paste	7.8/10
Pitchfork	7.4/10
Slant Magazine	3.5/5 stars

The Loveliest Time received generally positive reviews from music critics. The Loveliest Time received a score of 79 out of 100 on review aggregator Metacritic based on 8 critics' reviews, indicating "generally favorable" reception.

Kate Solomon of The i Paper called the album "really cohesive, exciting and very, very fun". Steve Erickson of Slant Magazine said the "more joyful, vibrant songs" act as a "sonic and thematic counterpoint" to The Loneliest Time, but claimed that the album is "less consistent" than Jepsen's 2020 release Dedicated Side B. Pitchfork's Harry Tafoya wrote that "where The Loneliest Time was steeped in personal loss and pandemic malaise, The Loveliest is strutting and extroverted, drunk off new love and bracingly direct about desire", calling it "a solid counterpart to its sister album". Upon the album's release, the song "Psychedelic Switch" was featured as Pitchfork's "Best New Track".

== Track listing ==
The Loveliest Time – Standard edition
No.	Title	Writer(s)	Producer(s)	Length
1.	"Anything to Be with You"	Carly Rae Jepsen; Jared Manierka; Noonie Bao; Patrik Berger; Tavish Crowe	Patrik Berger; John Hill	3:17
2.	"Kamikaze"	Jepsen; Jakob Hazell; Svante Halldin	Jack & Coke	2:59
3.	"After Last Night"	Jepsen; Bao; Rostam Batmanglij	Rostam Batmanglij	3:29
4.	"Aeroplanes"	Jepsen; Berger	Berger	3:21
5.	"Shy Boy"	Jepsen; Ben Romans; Ethan Gruska; Kyle Shearer; Nate Campany	James Ford	3:29
6.	"Kollage"	Jepsen; Berger	Berger	4:17
7.	"Shadow"	Jepsen; Batmanglij	Batmanglij	2:49
8.	"Psychedelic Switch"	Jepsen; Shearer; Nate Cyphert	Kyle Shearer	4:32
9.	"So Right"	Jepsen; Cole Marsden Greif-Neill; Cyphert	Cole Marsden Greif-Neill	3:36
10.	"Come Over"	Jepsen; John Hill; Jordan Palmer; Campany	John Hill; Jordan Palmer	2:54
11.	"Put It to Rest"	Jepsen; Bao; Berger	Berger	3:18
12.	"Stadium Love"	Jepsen; Lewis OfMan	Lewis OfMan; Oliver Lundström	2:51
Total length:				40:52

The Loveliest Time – Japanese CD and digital edition (bonus track)
No.	Title	Writer(s)	Producer(s)	Length
13.	"Weekend Love"	Jepsen; Gruska	Gruska	2:42
Total length:				43:34

=== Notes ===
- "Shy Boy" contains an interpolation of "Midas Touch" by Midnight Star, written by Boaz Watson and June Williams.

== Personnel ==
=== Musicians ===
- Carly Rae Jepsen – vocals (all tracks), background vocals (tracks 2, 7, 8, 13)
- Patrik Berger – programming (1, 11), drums (1), keyboards (4, 6, 11)
- Elliot Bergman – horn (1)
- Markus Krunegård – programming (1)
- Jakob Hazell – bass guitar, drums, keyboards, programming (2)
- Svante Halldin – bass guitar, drums, keyboards, programming (2)
- Rostam Batmanglij – drum programming, percussion, synthesizer (3, 7); drum machine, strings (3); synth bass (7)
- Angel Deradoorian – background vocals (3)
- Joey Messina-Doerning – piano (3)
- Jesper Nordenström – keyboards (4, 6, 11)
- Cristoffer Cantillo – drums (4), percussion (11)
- James Ford – bass guitar, drums, guitar, keyboards, synthesizer (5)
- Rob Moose – strings (5)
- Danielle Haim – drums (7)
- Nate Cyphert – background vocals (8, 9)
- Kyle Shearer – background vocals, bass guitar, drum programming, guitar, synthesizer (8)
- Cole M.G.N. – drum programming, electric bass, electric guitar, synthesizer (9)
- Evan Smith – saxophone (9)
- Jordan Palmer – bass guitar, drums, guitar, synthesizer(10)
- John Hill – bass guitar, drums, guitar, synthesizer (10)
- Nils Törnqvist – drums (11)
- Oliver Lundström – additional vocals, bass guitar, drums, synthesizer (12)
- Lewis OfMan – sampler, synthesizer, synthesizer programming (12)
- Ethan Gruska – bass guitar, Mellotron, percussion, programming, synthesizer (13)

=== Technical ===
- Ruairi O'Flaherty – mastering
- Lars Stalfors – mixing (1, 14)
- Alex Ghenea – mixing (2)
- Manny Marroquin – mixing (3, 7)
- Anthony Dolhai – mixing (4–6, 11, 12)
- Ike Schultz – mixing (8)
- David Wrench – mixing (9)
- Tom Norris – mixing (10)
- Patrik Berger – engineering (1, 4, 6, 11)
- Michelle Amkoff – engineering (1, 4, 6, 11)
- Jack & Coke – engineering (2)
- Rostam Batmanglij – engineering (3, 7)
- Joey Messina-Doerning – engineering (3, 7)
- James Ford – engineering (5)
- Kyle Shearer – engineering (8)
- Cole M.G.N. – engineering (9)
- Rob Cohen – engineering (10)
- Oliver Lundström – engineering (12)
- Ethan Gruska – engineering (13)
- Nacho Sotelo – mix engineering (4, 6, 11, 12)
- Anthony Vilchis – mixing assistance (3, 7)
- Trey Station – mixing assistance (3, 7)
- Zach Pereyra – mixing assistance (3, 7)

== Charts ==
Chart performance for The Loveliest Time
Chart (2023)	Peak position
German Digital Albums (GfK Entertainment)	63
Scottish Albums (Official Charts)	48
UK Albums Sales (OCC)	39
US Top Album Sales (Billboard)	32
US Indie Store Album Sales (Billboard)	22

== Release history ==
Release dates and formats for The Loveliest Time
Region	Date	Format(s)	Label	Ref.
Various	July 28, 2023	Digital download; streaming	604; School Boy; Interscope	
Various	September 8, 2023	CD; vinyl	604; School Boy; Interscope	
