= Move Me (song) =

Single by Lewis OfMan and Carly Rae Jepsen
- Released: 15 July 2022
- Genre: House; dance-pop
- Length: 3:59
- Label: Profil de Face
- Songwriters: Lewis OfMan; Carly Rae Jepsen
- Producer: Lewis OfMan

Lewis OfMan singles chronology
"Nails Matching My Fit" (2022)	"Move Me" (2022)	"On & On (Lewis OfMan Houseparty Remix)" (2022)

Carly Rae Jepsen singles chronology
"Western Wind" (2022)	"Move Me" (2022)	"Beach House" (2022)

Music video
- "Move Me" on YouTube

"Move Me" is a standalone collaborative single by French synth-pop producer Lewis OfMan and Canadian pop singer Carly Rae Jepsen, released July 15, 2022, by Profil de Face. The release's cover art was illustrated by OfMan's father Jean-Philippe Delhomme.

== Background ==
Per Jepsen, she was first introduced to OfMan's music via a playlist sent to her by a friend. She "kept pausing at the same track of Lewis's thinking 'this is really good'". She praised OfMan as having one of her "favorite male voices." OfMan further explained that he received a call from Jepsen and was "honored that she liked [his] music in such a genuine way."

OfMan was initially inspired to write the song after being struck by an attendee of a party in Florence but feeling both were unable to pursue each other. The day after, OfMan wrote an initial draft of the song and shared it with Jepsen, who "instantly felt the song" and sent over voice recordings and additional ideas for the song.

== Style and reception ==
Stereogum's Chris Deville thought the song's piano-based house style was timely, given recent releases by Drake and Beyoncé, whose usage of house music in their 2022 music generated renewed discussion about the genre. BroadwayWorld's Michael Major wrote that the song "pair[s] classic house music piano chords with rich vocal melodies", making for "an infectious dose of slick dance-pop." Prelude Press's Dom Vigil called the track a feel-good summer jam. Paper's Shaad D'Souza wrote that "it's a joy to hear Carly Rae Jepsen go full-blown house diva" and opined that the song combines classic dance music with the aesthetics of lo-fi music.

== Personnel ==
- Lewis OfMan – vocals, producer, songwriter
- Carly Rae Jepsen – vocals, songwriter
- Bruno Ellingham – mixing engineer
- Alex Gopher – mastering engineer
- Jean-Philippe Delhomme – cover art illustration
