= Electropop =

Form of electronic songs/music

- Stylistic origins: Synth-pop; pop; electronic; electronica; dance; 21st Century Revival: Synth-pop; electronic; pop; electroclash; electronica; R&B; hip-hop
- Cultural origins: Early 1980s, United Kingdom and Japan
- Derivative forms: Chillwave; dance-pop; uplifting trance

Other topics
- Alternative dance; bitpop; chill-out; C-pop; J-pop; K-pop; V-pop; Europop; post-disco; electro; electroclash; electro-industrial; electro house; indie electronic; electronic rock; indie pop; progressive house; recession pop

Electropop is a popular music fusion genre combining elements of the electronic and pop styles.

Electropop has been described as a variant of synth-pop with emphasis on a hard electronic sound. The genre was developed in the 1980s and saw a revival of popularity and influence in the late 2000s. The genre is often confused with electro, which is sometimes called electro-pop. However, electro is a separate genre incorporating funk and early hip hop.

== History ==
=== Early 1980s ===
Depeche Mode's composer Martin Gore said: "For anyone of our generation involved in electronic music, Kraftwerk were the godfathers".

During the early 1980s, Japanese artists such as Yellow Magic Orchestra and Ryuichi Sakamoto and British artists such as Gary Numan, Depeche Mode, Orchestral Manoeuvres in the Dark, the Human League, Soft Cell, John Foxx and Visage helped pioneer a new synth-pop style that drew more heavily from electronic music and emphasized primary usage of synthesizers.

Some fascinating new music began arriving on these shores; it was dubbed electropop, because electronic instrumentation — mainly synthesizers and syndrums — was used to craft pop songs. "Pop Muzik" by M was one of the first. There was a gradual accumulation of worthy electropop discs, though they were still mostly heard only in rock discos. But in 1981, the floodgates opened, and "new music" at last made a mighty splash. The breakthrough song was "Don't You Want Me" by the Human League.

— Anglomania: The Second British Invasion, by Parke Puterbaugh for Rolling Stone, November 1983.

=== 21st century ===
==== 2000s ====
Britney Spears' highly influential fifth studio album Blackout (2007) is credited for bringing the genre to mainstream prominence. The media in 2009 ran articles proclaiming a new era of different electropop stars, and indeed the times saw a rise in popularity of several electropop artists. In the Sound of 2009 poll of 130 music experts conducted for the BBC, ten of the top fifteen artists named were of the electropop genre. Lady Gaga had major commercial success from 2008 with her debut album The Fame. Music writer Simon Reynolds noted that "Everything about Gaga came from electroclash, except the music, which wasn't particularly 1980s". Singer Michael Angelakos of Passion Pit said in a 2009 interview that while playing electropop was not his intention, the limitations of dorm life made the genre more accessible.

In 2009, The Guardian quoted James Oldham—head of artists and repertoire at A&M Records—as saying "All A&R departments have been saying to managers and lawyers: 'Don't give us any more bands because we're not going to sign them and they're not going to sell records.' So everything we've been put on to is electronic in nature."

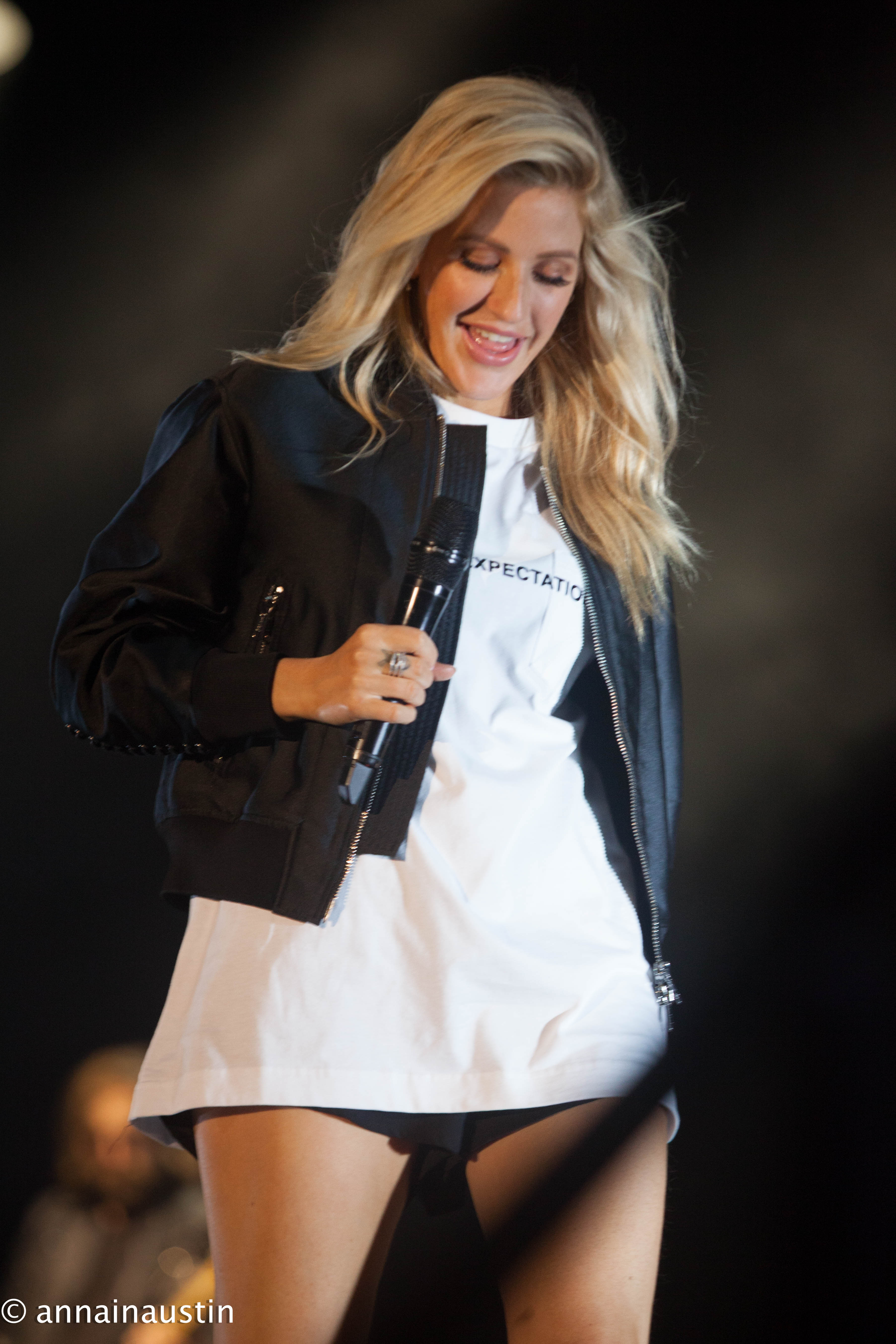
Ellie Goulding became one of the best-known figures in contemporary electropop music.

==== 2010s ====
In the 2010s, electropop music saw an increase in its commercial popularity. This owed to the success of artists such as Avicii, Lady Gaga, Calvin Harris, Kesha, Rihanna, Zedd, and Ellie Goulding, in an era now often referred to as recession pop.

Zedd's debut album Clarity was one of the records that influenced the development of electronic pop music into the mainstream, mixing strong electronic beats with catchy tunes performed by pop artists that made him and the genre gain commercial popularity in during the 2010s, and as well carving his own pop persona.

Electropop acts that achieved either commercial or critical success during the 2010s include: Sofi Tukker, Lykke Li, Mura Masa, Empire of the Sun, CHVRCHES, AlunaGeorge, Icona Pop, Tove Lo, BROODS, Troye Sivan, Charli xcx, MØ, Florrie, BANKS, Bright Light Bright Light, Foxes, AURORA, Allie X, and Marina.

The Korean pop music scene has also become dominated and influenced by electropop, particularly with boy bands and girl groups such as Super Junior, SHINee, f(x) and Girls' Generation.

==== 2020s ====
Some contemporary artists that have been highlighted as part of the new decade of electropop music include: Slayyyter, Ayesha Erotica, Sigrid and Billie Eilish, with the latter earning critical praise and commercial success just at the ending of the last decade. Kenneth Womack for Salon wrote that Eilish had "staked her claim as the reigning queen of electropop" with her critical and commercial hit album When We All Fall Asleep, Where Do We Go?.

== See also ==
- Auto-Tune
- Dance-pop
- Futurepop
- Minimal wave
- New musick
- Recession pop
- Vaporwave
