= Western Wind (song) =

Single by Carly Rae Jepsen

from the album The Loneliest Time
- Released: May 6, 2022
- Length: 3:46
- Label: 604; Schoolboy; Interscope
- Songwriters: Carly Rae Jepsen; Rostam Batmanglij
- Producer: Rostam Batmanglij

Carly Rae Jepsen singles chronology
"It's Not Christmas Till Somebody Cries" (2020)	"Western Wind" (2022)	"Move Me" (2022)

Music video
- "Western Wind" on YouTube

"Western Wind" is a song by Canadian singer-songwriter Carly Rae Jepsen, released as the lead single from her sixth studio album The Loneliest Time on May 6, 2022, by 604, Schoolboy, and Interscope Records. The song, co-written with and produced by Rostam Batmanglij, was released alongside a music video directed by Taylor Fauntleroy which features Jepsen "in a lush landscape wearing pretty, flowing pastel outfits, aptly capturing the season and embracing spring fever."

== Background ==
During the COVID-19 pandemic, Jepsen's maternal grandmother died, and due to Jepsen being in California, her grandmother being back in Jepsen's native Canada, and them being separated by international travel restrictions, Jepsen was alone while grieving. Per an interview with Crack's Ilana Kaplan, the grief and separation from her family fueled her creativity, leading to "Western Wind", which Kaplan describes as a "bewitching, lightly percussive lead single that evokes Stevie Nicks and recalls [Jepsen's] love of James Taylor." Jepsen said "Western Wind" was chosen as the lead single because "it was so opposite to what I normally do, which is start with the jingle-esque type song, and leave the rest for later."

== Promotion ==
Jepsen first teased the single release via messages posted to her Twitter account, including lyrics excerpts and a hand-drawn map of California with the caption "x marks the spot" posted on April 4. This was followed on April 6 by billboards which had the words "Western Wind" and a phone number. Calling the phone number returned a prerecorded message from Jepsen where she said "Hello. You've reached the Carly Rae Jepsen hotline. Text me here to stay in the loop on all the kinds of things: new music, tour, secrets that I haven't even come up with yet. News... no, wait, there will be no news. Sorry. But there will be music for sure." On April 16, Jepsen debuted the new song live at her Coachella set.

== Music video ==
The single was released alongside a music video directed by Taylor Fauntleroy. The video depicts Jepsen riding an electric scooter across green fields, twirling through yellow flowers, and frolicking in an assortment of diaphanous gowns. Per The A.V. Club's Gabrielle Sanchez, the video "feels like something plucked from a Wes Anderson film." In an interview with Consequence of Sound's Kyle Meredith, Jepsen says the video was inspired by Kate Bush's "Wuthering Heights" video, specifically regarding how "even though she was alone, you could tell she was really singing to someone ... that wasn't there" and that Jepsen wanted to capture that same feeling. She also mentions that the climbing she does in the video was less difficult after a childhood of climbing trees and running around barefoot in "gravel races", leaving her feeling "right at home".

== Style and reception ==
Stereogum's Rachel Brodsky calls the song a "breezy", "earth goddess-y love letter to California" with "piano, synths, and an easy mid-tempo beat" over which Jepsen sings "a well-timed springtime jaunt" including the lyrics "Coming in like a western wind / Do you feel home from all directions / First bloom, you know it's Spring / Reminding me love that it's all connected." Pitchfork's Quinn Moreland calls the song "just the right amount of easy-going", with producer Rostam Batmanglij "once again assert[ing] himself as a skillful conjurer of chill vibes", creating a track that "coasts on a sumptuous blend of mellow keys, feathery drums, and an unassuming guitar solo."

NPR Music's Hazel Cills notes that on "Western Wind", Jepsen "shakes the glitter of her last few albums out of her hair, ditching her studied electro-pop for "Thank You"-biting bongos on this relaxed song about finding love in the wilds of California" which "builds on a slightly hippie-dippie, granola trend of pop girl restraint working its way through music over the last few years — think Folklore's acoustic cottagecore, Solar Power's off-the-grid optimism, the mid-'00s, Starbucks check-out CD minimalism of Haim's jazzy 2019 single "Summer Girl".

=== Rankings ===
Year-end rankings for Western Wind
Publication	List	Rank	Ref.
Spectrum Culture	Spectrum Culture's 25 Best Songs of 2022	2	
Stereogum	Stereogum: James Rettig's Favorite Songs of 2022	7	
The New York Times	The New York Times: Lindsay Zoladz's Top 25 Songs of 2022	16	
Slant Magazine	Slant Magazine's 50 Best Songs of 2022	23	
Pitchfork	Pitchfork's 100 Best Songs of 2022	43	
Treble	Treble's 100 Best Songs of 2022	72	

== Personnel ==
- Carly Rae Jepsen – vocals, songwriting
- Rostam Batmanglij – songwriting, producer, acoustic guitar, bass, conga, drum, electric guitar, clapping, organ, piano, shaker, synthesizer, tambourine, background vocals, programming, recording engineer
- Andrew Tachine – conga, drums, tambourine
- Joey Messina-Doerning – conga, recording engineer
- Julia Ross and Angel Deradoorian – background vocals
- Shawn Everett – mixing engineer
- Emily Lazar and Chris Allgood – mastering engineers
- Travis Pavur – assistant recording engineer
- Ivan Wayman – additional engineer

== Charts ==
Chart performance for "Western Wind"
Chart (2022)	Peak position
Japan Hot Overseas (Billboard Japan)	11
