= The Loneliest Time (song) =

2022 single by Carly Rae Jepsen featuring Rufus Wainwright

Single by Carly Rae Jepsen featuring Rufus Wainwright

from the album The Loneliest Time
- Released: October 7, 2022
- Genre: Dance-pop; Disco
- Length: 4:34
- Label: 604; Schoolboy; Interscope
- Songwriters: Carly Rae Jepsen; Kyle Shearer; Nate Cyphert
- Producer: Kyle Shearer

Carly Rae Jepsen singles chronology
"Talking to Yourself" (2022)	"The Loneliest Time" (2022)	"Surrender My Heart" (2023)

Rufus Wainwright singles chronology
"A Wanderer in the Sleeping City" (2022)	"The Loneliest Time" (2022)	"Dear World" (2023)

Music video
- "The Loneliest Time" on YouTube

"The Loneliest Time" is a song by Canadian singer-songwriter Carly Rae Jepsen, featuring Canadian singer-songwriter Rufus Wainwright. The fourth single from Jepsen's sixth studio album of the same name, it was released on October 7, 2022, by 604, Schoolboy, and Interscope Records. The song was written by Jepsen, Kyle Shearer, and Nate Cyphert, and produced by Kyle Shearer.

== Critical reception ==
=== Rankings ===
Year-end rankings for "The Loneliest Time"
Publication	List	Rank	Ref.
Crack	Crack Magazine's Top 25 Tracks of 2022	17	
Coup De Main	Coup De Main's Best Songs of 2022	22	
Rolling Stone	Rolling Stone's 100 Best Songs of 2022	23	
The FADER	The FADER's 100 Best Songs of 2022	41	
The Needle Drop	The Needle Drop's Top 50 Songs of 2022	47	
Billboard	Billboard's 100 Best Songs of 2022	82	

== Personnel ==
- Vocals: Carly Rae Jepsen, Rufus Wainwright
- Background vocals: Kyle Shearer, Nate Cyphert
- Songwriting: Carly Rae Jepsen, Kyle Shearer, Nate Cyphert
- Production: Kyle Shearer
- Bass, Drums, Synthesizer: Kyle Shearer
- Violin: Elizabeth Lamb, Emily Kohavi, Cassie Morrow, Avery Bright
- Cello: Cara Fox
- Strings arrangement: Cody Fry
- Programming: Kyle Shearer
- Engineering: Kyle Shearer, James Krausse, Jared Fox
- Mixing: James Krausse
- Mastering: Emily Lazar
- Assistant mastering: Chris Allgood

== Charts ==
Chart performance for "The Loneliest Time"
Chart (2022)	Peak position
Japan Hot Overseas (Billboard Japan)	16
