= The Loneliest Time =

- Standard cover

Studio album by Carly Rae Jepsen
- Released: October 21, 2022
- Recorded: 2020–2022
- Studios: Bonnie Hill Studios (Los Angeles); The Royal Room; The Penthouse; Captain Cuts Studios (Los Angeles); Blue Meets Green; Taurus Recording; Rodeo Recording; Hope Studios; Matsor Projects Studios; Valentine Recording Studios; Valley Girl AV Club; Coronado Corner; The Fox Den
- Genre: Synth-pop
- Length: 42:23
- Labels: 604; School Boy; Interscope
- Producers: Rostam Batmanglij; Patrik Berger; Bullion; Captain Cuts; Max Hershenow; John Hill; Alex Hope; Oliver Lundström; Luke Niccoli; Jordan Palmer; Imad Royal; SameSame; Kyle Shearer; Solomonophonic

Carly Rae Jepsen chronology
Dedicated Side B (2020)	The Loneliest Time (2022)	The Loveliest Time (2023)

Singles from The Loneliest Time
- 1. "Western Wind" Released: May 6, 2022; 2. "Beach House" Released: August 5, 2022; 3. "Talking to Yourself" Released: September 16, 2022; 4. "The Loneliest Time" Released: October 7, 2022; 5. "Surrender My Heart" Released: December 15, 2022

The Loneliest Time is the sixth studio album by Canadian singer Carly Rae Jepsen. It was released on October 21, 2022, through 604 Records in Canada, and School Boy and Interscope Records. The album was preceded by the release of five singles, "Western Wind", "Beach House", "Talking to Yourself", the title track and "Surrender My Heart". The album received positive reviews and was placed on several lists of best of the year. In support of the album, Jepsen embarked on The So Nice Tour, which began in September 2022.

== Background ==
In May 2020, Jepsen revealed that she had recorded an "entire quarantine album" during the lockdown. Jepsen spoke to The Guardian that she was writing songs over Zoom alongside longtime collaborator Tavish Crowe.

While discussing the album in an interview with Crack, Jepsen stated she wanted to be less conscious of the decades she's been moving. Instead, she was inspired by various styles, including 80s pop, 70s folk, funk, and disco. Jepsen also explained she wanted to become more self-reflective and analytical of her own behaviours:

I had the playground of all the eras to jump from, and this was more just writing from the heart, in whatever direction the songs wanted to go, ... It excited me to have those moments of flirtation on the [new] album, but also broaden the spectrum of what the subject of a pop song was allowed to be...

In an interview with The Ringer, Jepsen teased the possibility of releasing a "side B" companion project to The Loneliest Time, as was done with her previous two albums, Emotion (2015) and Dedicated (2019), stating that "there's 65 [B-sides] that I've listened to that I could make something of...". This materialized as a companion piece titled The Loveliest Time, which was released on July 28, 2023.

== Promotion ==
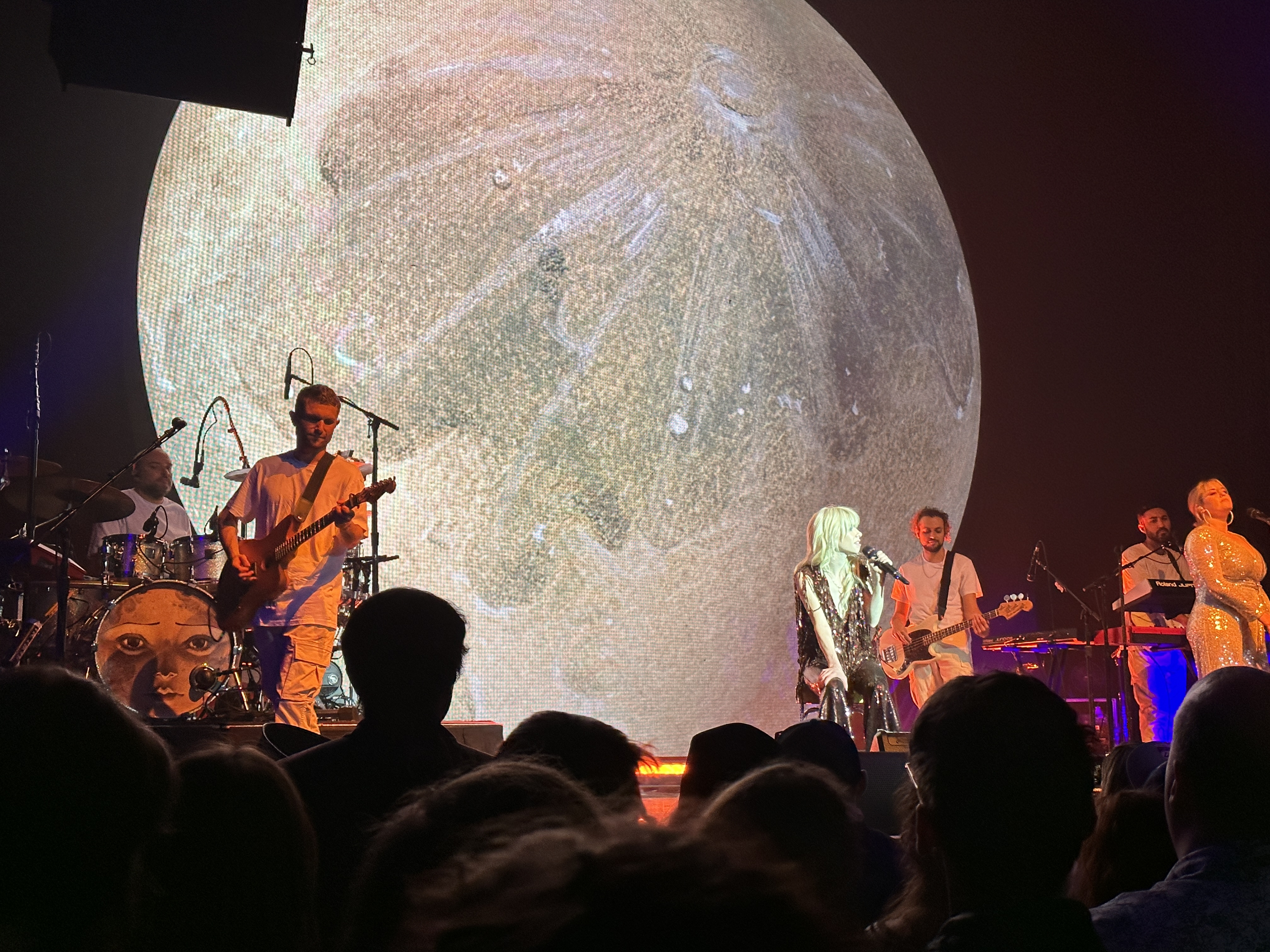
Jepsen during her So Nice Tour

"Western Wind" was released as the lead single from the album on May 6, 2022. The album was made available to pre-order on August 2 later that year. The second single, "Beach House", was released on August 5 and a third single, "Talking to Yourself", followed on September 16. The fourth single, also the title track which as well featured Rufus Wainwright, was released October 7. "Surrender My Heart" was released as the album's fifth single on December 15, alongside a music video.

On September 21, Jepsen embarked on her fourth concert tour across North America, The So Nice Tour. While on tour, she announced more dates in the United Kingdom, Europe and Australia. The tour concluded on August 13, 2023, and had visited 7 countries across 69 shows.

== Critical reception ==
Professional ratings
Aggregate scores
Source	Rating
AnyDecentMusic?	7.3/10
Metacritic	79/100
Review scores
Source	Rating
AllMusic	4/5 stars
The Daily Telegraph	4/5 stars
Entertainment Weekly	B+
Clash	6/10
NME	4/5 stars
Pitchfork	6.5/10
Rolling Stone	4/5 stars
Slant Magazine	3.5/5 stars

The Loneliest Time received mostly positive reviews from music critics; at Metacritic, which assigns a normalized rating out of 100 to reviews from mainstream critics, the album received a score of 79 out of 100 based on 17 reviews.

Rob Sheffield of Rolling Stone wrote "The Loneliest Time is her most "emotionally adventurous" music yet—"high-gloss post-bubblegum synth-pop that packs a serious punch even at its fizziest." Hannah Mylrea of NME awarded the album four out of five stars, writing that The Loneliest Time "sees Jepsen's now signature sonics infused with more expansive influences, although never deferring too far from the tried and trusted sounds of past." Reviewing the album for AllMusic, Heather Phares concluded that Jepsen's "charm holds together The Loneliest Time's whirlwind of daydreams, confessions, and decades of pop allusions", calling it "another strong album" from her. Olivia Horn of Pitchfork complimented certain aspects of the production, but criticized some of its "corny" lyrics and the lack of focus. Gem Stokes of Clash said the album is "a far cry from the saccharine star that launched Jepsen's career but proves her musical pliability."

The album was nominated for Pop Album of the Year at the Juno Awards of 2023.

=== Rankings ===
Year-end rankings for The Loneliest Time
Publication	List	Rank	Ref.
Albumism	The 100 Best Albums of 2022	35	
The A.V. Club	The 30 Best Albums of 2022	6	
Clash	Clash's Albums of the Year 2022	52	
Consequence of Sound	Top 50 Albums of 2022	26	
The Forty Five	Albums of the year 2022	34	
GQ Magazine	The best albums of 2022	—N/a	
No Ripcord	The 50 Best Albums of 2022	33	
Nylon	Nylon's Favorite Albums of 2022	—N/a	
PopMatters	The 80 Best Albums of 2022	39	
The Ringer	The 33 Best Albums of 2022	27	
Under the Radar	Under the Radar's Top 100 Albums of 2022	61	

== Commercial performance ==
In Jepsen's homeland, Canada, The Loneliest Time debuted at number 18 on the Canadian Albums Chart. In the United States, the album debuted at number 19 on the Billboard 200 selling 18,500 total units and number 6 on the Billboard Top Albums Sales Chart, with 12,000 pure copies sold. The Loneliest Time also went on to debut at number 16 on the UK Albums Chart, becoming her highest-peaking album in the UK in ten years.

== Track listing ==
The Loneliest Time – Standard edition
No.	Title	Writer(s)	Producer(s)	Length
1.	"Surrender My Heart"	Carly Rae Jepsen; Imad Royal; Max Hershenow	Royal; Hershenow; Jordan Palmer^{[a]}	2:48
2.	"Joshua Tree"	Jepsen; Tavish Crowe; Luke Nicolli	Nicolli; Palmer^{[a]}	2:29
3.	"Talking to Yourself"	Jepsen; Simon Wilcox; Benjamin Berger; Ryan Rabin	Captain Cuts	2:53
4.	"Far Away"	Jepsen; Crowe; Nathan Jenkins	Bullion; Jenkins^{[v]}; Jonathan Gilmore^{[v]}	2:59
5.	"Sideways"	Jepsen; Jay Stolar; John Hill; Palmer	Hill; Palmer	2:16
6.	"Beach House"	Jepsen; Nate Cyphert; Alex Hope	Hope; SameSame^{[a]}	2:30
7.	"Bends"	Jepsen; Crowe; Jenkins	Bullion; Gilmore^{[v]}	3:15
8.	"Western Wind"	Jepsen; Rostam Batmanglij	Batmanglij	3:45
9.	"So Nice"	Jepsen; Cyphert; Kyle Shearer	Shearer	3:39
10.	"Bad Thing Twice"	Jepsen; Stolar; Hill; Palmer; Crowe	Hill; Palmer	3:13
11.	"Shooting Star"	Jepsen; Jared Solomon; Danny Silberstein; Crowe	Solomonophonic	3:19
12.	"Go Find Yourself or Whatever"	Jepsen; Batmanglij	Batmanglij	4:44
13.	"The Loneliest Time" (featuring Rufus Wainwright)	Jepsen; Cyphert; Shearer	Shearer	4:34
Total length:				42:23

The Loneliest Time – Target and HMV editions (bonus track)
No.	Title	Writer(s)	Producer(s)	Length
14.	"Keep Away"	Jepsen; Cyphert; Shearer	Shearer	4:02
Total length:				46:25

The Loneliest Time – Japanese CD edition (bonus tracks)
No.	Title	Writer(s)	Producer(s)	Length
14.	"Anxious"	Jepsen; Crowe; Oliver Lundström	Lundström	2:57
15.	"No Thinking Over the Weekend"	Jepsen; Bao; Patrik Berger	Berger	4:42
Total length:				49:23

The Loneliest Time – Digital edition (bonus track)
No.	Title	Writer(s)	Producer(s)	Length
16.	"Keep Away"	Jepsen; Cyphert; Shearer	Shearer	4:02
Total length:				54:04

=== Notes ===
- ^{^[a]} indicates an additional producer
- ^{^[v]} indicates a vocal producer

== Personnel ==
Musicians

- Carly Rae Jepsen – vocals
- Tavish Crowe – musical direction
- Imad Royal – background vocals, bass, drums, guitar (1)
- Max Hershenow – background vocals, drums (1)
- Luke Niccoli – bass, drums, guitar, keyboards, programming (2)
- Captain Cuts – programming (3)
  - Ben Berger – background vocals (3)
  - Ryan Rabin – background vocals (3)
- Trevor Rabin – guitar (3)
- Simon Wilcox – programming (3)
- Nathan Jenkins – bass, synthesizer, vocals (4, 7); vocal programming (7)
- Liam Hutton – drums (4)
- Jordan Palmer – drums, guitar, synthesizer (5, 10); bass (10)
- John Hill – drums (5), guitar (5, 10), bass (10)
- Nate Cyphert – background vocals (6, 9, 13, 16)
- Alex Hope – guitar, programming, synthesizer (6)
- Rob Cohen – programming (6)
- Tony Marino – vocals (6)
- Bobby Wooten – vocals (6)
- Ben Romans – vocals (6)
- Joey Hendricks – vocals (6)
- Jared Manierka – vocals (6)
- Rostam Batmanglij – acoustic guitar, bass, electric guitar, piano, synthesizer (8, 12); clapping, conga, drums, organ, programming, shaker, tambourine (8); drum programming, Hammond B3, mandolin, percussion, sitar (12)
- Andrew Tachine – conga, drums, tambourine (8)
- Joey Messina-Doerning – conga (8)
- Kyle Shearer – bass, programming (9, 13, 16); guitar (9, 16); background vocals, drums, synthesizer (13)
- Georgia Greene – background vocals (12)
- Quinn D'Andrea – background vocals (12)
- Lauren Jones – background vocals (12)
- Andrew Bulbrook – violin (12)
- Cara Fox – cello (13)
- Cody Fry – string arrangement (13, 16)
- Avery Bright – violin (13)
- Elizabeth Lamb – violin (13)
- Emily Kohavi – violin (13)
- Cassie Morrow – violin (13)
- Rufus Wainwright – vocals (13)
- Oliver Lundström – bass, guitar, programming, synthesizer (14)
- Cristoffer Cantillo – drums (15)
- Evan Smith – flute (15)
- Patrik Berger – programming (15)

Technical

- Emily Lazar – mastering
- Chris Allgood – mastering
- Tom Norris – mixing, engineering (1, 2, 5, 10)
- Rob Kinelski – mixing, engineering (3)
- Anthony Dolhai – mixing (4, 7, 14), engineering (4, 7)
- Mitch McCarthy – mixing, engineering (6)
- Shawn Everett – mixing, engineering (8)
- James Krausse – mixing, engineering (9, 13, 16)
- Nathan Phillips – mixing, engineering (11)
- Geoff Swan – mixing, engineering (12)
- Davey Badiuk – mixing (14)
- Jamie Snell – mixing (15)
- Imad Royal – engineering (1)
- Max Hershenow – engineering (1)
- Luke Niccoli – engineering (2)
- Jordan Palmer – engineering (2)
- Captain Cuts – engineering (3)
- Eli Heisler – engineering (3)
- Nathan Jenkins – engineering (4)
- Rostam Batmanglij – engineering (8, 12)
- Joey Messina-Doerning – engineering (8, 12)
- Kyle Shearer – engineering (9, 13, 16)
- Rob Cohen – engineering (10)
- Jared Fox – engineering (13)
- Ivan Wayman – additional engineering (8)
- Matt Cahill – additional engineering (12)
- Niko Battistini – additional engineering (12)
- Travis Pavur – engineering assistance (8)

Visuals

- Jolie Clemens – creative direction, art direction, design
- Meredith Jenks – photography
- Alexis Franklin – painting of Carly's eye
- Hayley Atkin – styling
- Jenna Remy – fashion assistant
- Jon Liekcfelt – hair
- Gregory Arlt – makeup
- Jolie Clemens – art direction, creative director, design

== Charts ==
Chart performance for The Loneliest Time
Chart (2022)	Peak position
Australian Albums (ARIA)	62
Belgian Albums (Ultratop Flanders)	180
Belgian Albums (Ultratop Wallonia)	180
Canadian Albums (Billboard)	18
German Digital Albums (GfK Entertainment)	39
Irish Albums (IRMA)	61
Japanese Albums (Oricon)	52
Japanese Hot Albums (Billboard Japan)	52
New Zealand Albums (RMNZ)	37
Scottish Albums (Official Charts)	7
Spanish Albums (Promusicae)	94
UK Albums (Official Charts)	16
US Billboard 200	19
US Indie Store Album Sales (Billboard)	7

== Release history ==
Release dates and formats for The Loneliest Time
Region	Date	Format(s)	Label	Ref.
Various	October 21, 2022	CD; digital download; streaming; vinyl	604; School Boy; Interscope	
