= Plisskën Festival =

Annual music festival in Athens, Greece

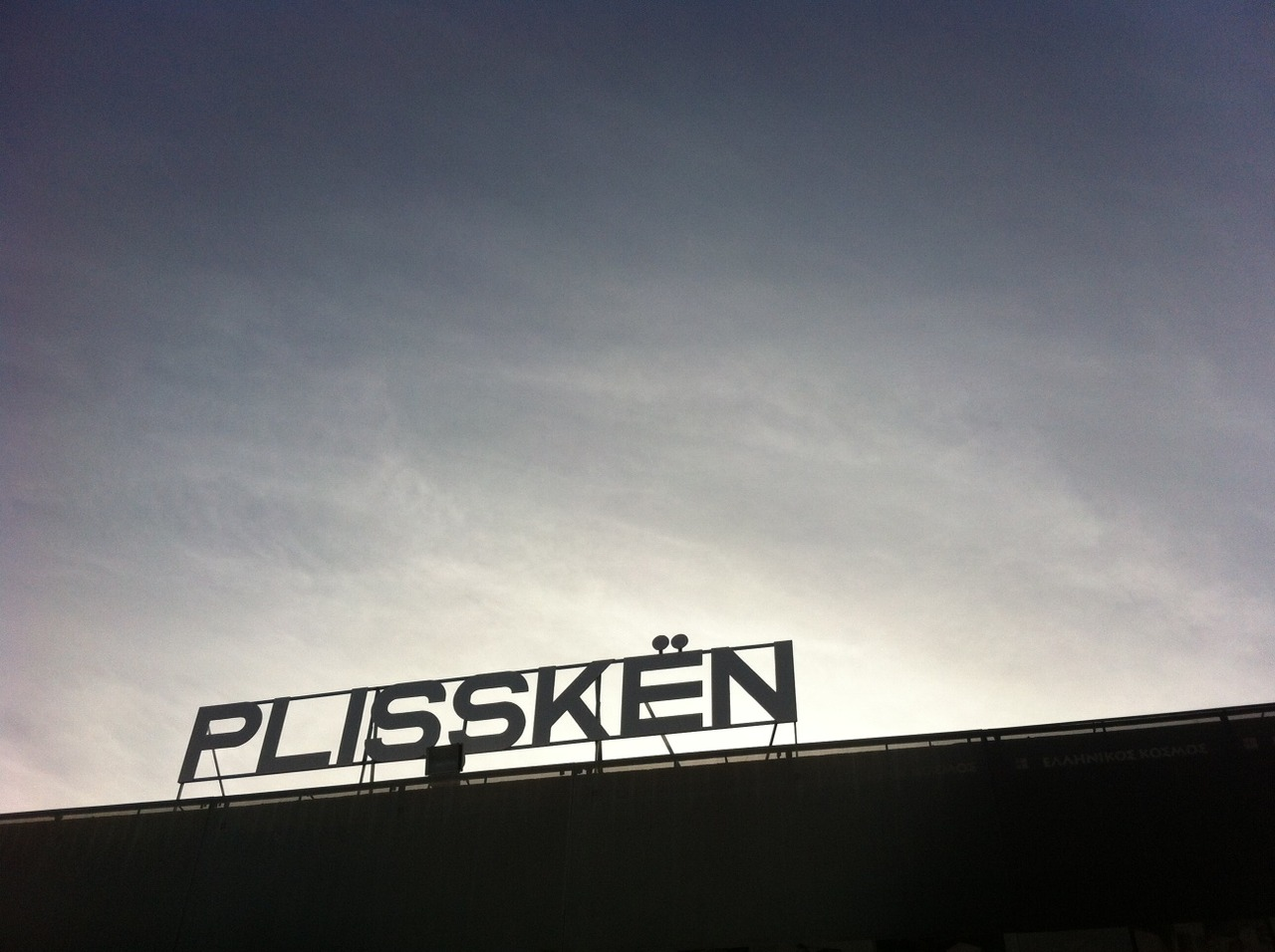
Plisskën Festival sign photographed during the festival's third edition in May, 2013.

Plisskën Festival is an annual music festival in Athens, Greece that started in December 2010.

During its previous editions, the festival has been held at Building 56 of the cultural centre Hellenic Cosmos.

Despite the ongoing fluctuations of Greece's social-economic environment, the festival has managed to successfully sustain itself, while increasing exponentially its line-up on a year by year basis. Gradually securing its place as a permanent fixture on the European festival scene, the festival attracts an ever-growing amount of international visitors.

Spanning a total line-up of more that 350 international artists and numerous local acts over its seven editions, the festival is noted for its genre-defying philosophy by embracing music from a diversified background, as well as its concentration on showcasing some of the latest talent to emerge from the international music scene. Some of the acts that have appeared in previous line-ups include: Wild Beasts, 65daysofstatic, Black Lips, Mount Kimbie, Fuck Buttons, Nightmares on Wax, Vitalic, Shackleton, Death Grips, Peaches, These New Puritans, Ebo Taylor, King Krule, Fucked Up, King Khan and the Shrines, The Haxan Cloak, Dope Body, Egyptian Hip Hop, Girls Names, King Tuff, Triggerfinger, The Notwist, Andrew Weatherall, Shigeto, Forest Swords.

A strong focal point encompasses sustainability and volunteering alike, with the festival introducing at 2012,The Lab, an annual workshop for young people involving theory and practice on the makings of a festival. For the last two years, the festival has been nominated as 'Best Indoor Festival' from the European Festival Awards, while it continuously maintains its environmental-conscious efforts and has been honored with the Commended Greener Festival Award 2014 for a second year on a row.

In December 2014, Plisskën Festival launched its first Winter edition in Athens and Thessaloniki, as a 4-year anniversary from its inception, featuring the likes of Lee 'Scratch' Perry, Swans, Simian Mobile Disco, The Bug and Son Lux

December 2017 saw the Festival hosting acts such as Mac DeMarco, Mulatu Astatke, Lena Platonos and others across its 2-day edition, with Liars and Lady Leshurr's performances being noted as festival highlights.

June 2019 was marked by the return of its two-day summer edition and the first ever Boiler Room Athens with Nicola Cruz, Khidja, Ana Helder, marcelDune and Noff Weezy.

The next edition of Plisskën Festival will take place June 12-13, 2022.

== Name ==
The name "Plisskën", adorned with a heavy metal umlaut, refers to the fictional character Snake Plissken from the films Escape from New York and Escape from L.A..

== Line-ups ==
=== 2010 ===
23rd Underpass, Alexander Robotnick, Chew Lips, Danger, FM Belfast, Futurecop!, Handsome Furs, Mondkopf, Pickster One, Poka, Robots in Disguise, Rykarda Parasol, The Longcut, The Lytics, These New Puritans.

=== 2012 ===
Alan Braxe, Andrew Weatherall, Bong-Ra, Camera, College, Dead Skeletons, Drums of Death, Forest Swords, Joker, Junior Boys, Kid606, King Khan and the Shrines, Liquid, Male Bonding, Michael Rother, Montana Cruz, Peaches, Rita Maia, Son of Kick, Team Ghost, The Notwist, Triggerfinger, Villa, We Were Promised Jetpacks

=== 2013 ===
Beat Culture, Blackbird Blackbird, Brandt Brauer Frick, Death Grips, Dope Body, Dream Koala, Ebo Taylor, Egyptian Hip Hop, Eliphino, Eraas, FM Belfast, Fucked Up, Giraffage, Girls Names, Jonas Rathsman, Kidnap Kid, King Krule, King Tuff, Larry Gus, Lil Silva, Moullinex, Oy, Patten, Pyramid, Shigeto, Skinnerbox, Slow Magic, The Boy, The Haxan Cloak, Truckfighters, Xosar, XXYYXX

=== 2014 ===
65daysofstatic, 307 Squad, A Victim of Society, BeGun, Black Lips, Bomba Energia Soundsystem, Bombing the Avenue, Boogarins, BrainD, Cooly G, Crocodiles, BeGun, D/R/U/G/S, Damien Jurado, Deadbeat, Digital Riot, Dirty Beaches, Djuma Soundsystem, Dotmessage, Dub Pistols, Duckem, Eagles for Hands, Fatima Al Qadiri, Fink, Fuck Buttons, Ghost Culture, Girls Against Boys, Imam Baildi Soundsystem, Jeph1, Jonathan Toubin, Kyoka, M A N I K, Mcmxc, Mickey Lightfoot, Mike Ls, Miltiades, Mount Kimbie, Nadia Ksaiba, Nightmare Air, Nightmares on Wax, No Age, The Noise Figures, Ossie, Pad Trio, Plastic Flowers, Raketkanon, Say Lou Lou, Seams, Shackleton, The Soft Moon, Son Lux, Suuns, Teranga Beat, Terra Exotica, The East, Tijuana Panthers, Vitalic, Wild Beasts, Wooden Shjips

=== 2014 (Winter Edition) ===
Lee 'Scratch' Perry, Swans, Simian Mobile Disco, The Bug, Son Lux

=== 2015 ===
...And You Will Know Us By the Trail of Dead, Acid Baby Jesus, Afformance, Amateurboyz, Âme, Andy Stott, Apanemic, Ariel Pink, Austra, Bad Spencer, Beardyman, Brodinski, Buke and Gase, Cairo Liberation Front, Clip!, Cult of Youth, Dalhous, Dels, Electric Wizard, Evian Christ, Fort Romeau, Gerd Janson, Gioumourtzina, Gonjasufi, Gus & Bonso, Happa, Iceage, Jaakko Eino Kalevi, Larry Tee, Liturgy, Livio & Roby, Metz, Mikal Cronin, Mogwai, Mononome, Morgan Delt, Mudhoney, Negros Tou Moria / NTM (The Black Morris), Perfume Genius, Pharmakon, Pharoahe Monch, Pow!, Ratking, Savages, Sekuoia, Sleaford Mods, Soul Clap, Squarepusher, Steve Gunn, Strand of Oaks, Tendts, The Coathangers, The Horrors, The Twilight Sad, Thee Oh Sees, Tiger & Woods, Tony Allen, Verveine, Warm Graves, Waxahatchee, Werkha, Whomadewho, Woz, Xylouris White

=== 2016 (Winter Edition) ===
Amelie Lens, Ath Kids, Aurora Halal, Babyfather, Beatrice Dillon, Benton, Black Athena, Charlotte De Witte, Craves, Death In Vegas, Doc Daneeka, Elijah & Skilliam, Ellen Allien, error404, flökosH, Forest Swords, Holy Monitor, Hydroessa, Klein, Kooba Tercu, La Femme, Laolu, Lord Tusk, Menta, Mueran Humanos, Nalyssa Green, Negros Tou Moria, NTS Radio, Optimo, Prefuse 73, Psychic Ills, Runner, Someone Who Isn't Me, Strange U, The Fog Ensemble, The Four Owls, The Vagina Lips, Tuxedomoon, Vatican Shadow, XXXY, Zomby

=== 2017 (Winter Edition) ===
67, Andy Stott, Anopolis, Autarkic, Bill Kouligas, Black Athena, Borrowed Identity, Brassica, Chaos in the CBD, Coby Sey, Dednewb, Demdike Stare, Dog2th, Gaika, Giganta, Hieroglyphic Being, Holy Fuck, Huerco S., Iguana Death Cult, Illum Sphere, Ivan Smagghe, Jessy Lanza, Joyce Wrice, Lady Leshurr, Lambert, Laps, Last Japan, Lena Platonos, Liars, Lotic, Mac Demarco, Matteo Vallicelli, Mulatu Astatke, NTS Radio, Pauli. Romare, Smerz, The Longcut Thomey Bors, Tops, Tosin Martyns, Weval

=== 2018 (Winter Edition) ===
Black Athena, David August, DEBONAIR, Elena Colombi, Lindstrøm, Lokier, Nathan Fake, object blue, Pantha Du Prince, Sama'

=== 2019 ===
Ana Helder, Black Athena, Black Milk, Bombino, Boy Harsher, Deena Abdelwahed, Donny Benet, D.Tiffany, Giant Swan, Giorgio Moroder, Hunee, Inga Mauer, Interstellar Funk, Jacques Greene, Jane Fitz, Jungle (band), Kap Bambino, Khidja, K-X-P, Lebanon Hanover, Lena Willikens, Loyal, Mehmet Aslan, Nicola Cruz, Object Blue, Optimo, Peter Bjorn and John, Poldoore, Prison Religion, Rone (musician), The Black Madonna, Tinariwen, Triptides, Violet

=== 2019 (Winter Edition) ===
Afrodeutsche, Bishop Nehru, Cabaret Nocturne, Carla dal Forno, E. Myers, Floating Points, Korea Town Acid, Quantic, Sama', Snapped Ankles

=== 2021 ===
La Femme, Goat, Kid Francescoli, LSDXOXO, bBymutha, Marina Satti, Avalon Emerson

=== 2022 ===
Bonobo, Caribou, Princess Nokia, slowthai, Mala Rodriguez, Jay Electronica
