= After All =

After All may refer to:

== Film ==
- After All (film), a 2006 Canadian short film
- After All, a Philippine film of 2024

== Literature ==
- After All (play), a 1929 play by John Van Druten
- Afterall, a British contemporary art journal
- After All, a 1995 memoir by Mary Tyler Moore
- After All, a 1913 novel by Mary Cholmondeley

== Music ==
- After All!, an 1878 one-act comic opera by Alfred Cellier and Frank Desprez
- Pure (Canadian band), originally After All, an alt rock band

=== Albums ===
- After All (Eddie Fisher album), 1984
- After All, by Bobby Bland, 1986
- After All, by Luciano, 1995
- After All..., by Motoi Sakuraba, 2011

=== Songs ===
- "After All" (All Saints song), 2018
- "After All" (Carly Rae Jepsen song), 2026
- "After All" (Cher and Peter Cetera song), 1989
- "After All" (David Bowie song), 1970
- "After All" (Delerium song), 2003
- "After All" (Ed Bruce song), 1983
- "After All" (The Miracles song), 1961; covered by the Supremes, 1961 (released 2000)
- "After All", by Air Supply from Air Supply, 1985
- "After All", by Al Jarreau from High Crime, 1984
- "After All", by Brett James, 2003
- "After All", by Carly Rae Jepsen from Day and Night, 2026
- "After All", by Collective Soul from Blender, 2000
- "After All", by Dar Williams from The Green World, 2000
- "After All", by Electric Light Orchestra from the B-side of the single "Rock 'n' Roll Is King", 1983
- "After All", by Elton John and Charlie Puth from The Lockdown Sessions, 2021
- "After All", by the Frank and Walters, 1992
- "After All", by Patty Loveless from Patty Loveless, 1987
- "After All", by Saving Abel, a non-album B-side from Saving Abel, 2008
- "After All", by Tennant/Lowe from Battleship Potemkin, 2005
- "After All", by Whitesnake from Flesh & Blood, 2019
- "After All (Holy)", by David Crowder Band from Give Us Rest, 2012
