= Terzian =

Terzian sometimes also Terziyan and Terzyan (Armenian: Թերզյան), common Armenian surname.

It may refer to:

Terzian

- Alain Terzian (born 1949), French-Armenian film producer
- Alexandros Terzian (born 1968), Argentine-Greek sprinter
- Alicia Terzian (born 1934), Argentine Armenian conductor, musicologist and composer
- Armen Terzian (1915–1989), American football official in the NFL
- Grace Paine Terzian (born 1952), chief communications officer of MediaDC publishers
- Hagop Terzian (1879–1915), Ottoman Armenian writer and pharmacist
- Jacques Terzian (1921–2016) formerly Hagop Terzian, American sculptor and businessperson
- Kristi Terzian (born 1967), American former alpine skier
- Philip Terzian (born 1950), American journalist
- Tovmas Terzian (1840–1909), famed Ottoman Armenian poet, playwright, and professor
- Yervant Terzian (1939–2019), American astronomer

Terziyan

- Nubar Terziyan (1909–1994), born Nubar Alyanak, Turkish Armenian actor
