= Written into Changes =

Studio album by Avalon Emerson & the Charm
- Released: March 20, 2026
- Recorded: Winter-spring 2024
- Studio: Braintree, England; London; Los Angeles; Glendale, California
- Genre: Dream pop; synth-pop; electronica
- Length: 37:06
- Label: Dead Oceans
- Producer: Avalon Emerson, Nathan Jenkins, Rostam Batmanglij

Avalon Emerson & the Charm chronology
| & the Charm (2023) | Written into Changes (2026) |

Singles from Written into Changes
- 1. "Eden" Released: November 13, 2025; 2. "Jupiter and Mars" Released: January 21, 2026; 3. "Written into Changes" Released: February 19, 2026

Written into Changes is the second studio album released by the American musician Avalon Emerson under the Avalon Emerson & the Charm moniker. It was released on March 20, 2026, through Dead Oceans. The album follows Emerson's 2023 release & the Charm and continues her move from club-oriented electronic production into song-based pop and dream pop.

The album was produced with Bullion and Rostam Batmanglij. Its songs were recorded in Braintree, London, Los Angeles, and Glendale, California, and include contributions from Keivon Mehdi Hobeheidar, Jay Flew, and Hunter Lombard.

Written into Changes received positive reviews from music critics, who described it as a fuller and more direct development of Emerson's work with the Charm, while noting its links to dream pop, synth-pop, electronica, and dance music. Consequence, Paste, the Guardian, and Pitchfork included the album on midyear or rolling best-of-2026 lists.

== Background and recording ==
Emerson had been known as a DJ and electronic producer before releasing & the Charm in 2023. In a MusicRadar interview about Written into Changes, she said that she wanted to keep pursuing the sound of that album after its first tour and quickly began work on the follow-up with Nathan Jenkins. Emerson said the title track concerned her move from Berlin to Los Angeles in 2020. She stated that she wrote the album's melodies and lyrics, and that most of the lyrics came from her personal life.

The album was recorded partly in a converted barn in Braintree, England, from winter into spring 2024, with additional work in London and Los Angeles. The two tracks co-produced with Batmanglij, "Jupiter and Mars" and "Earth Alive", were recorded in Los Angeles, while additional synthesizer work took place at the Synth Cabin at Rosen Sound in Glendale, California. Emerson told MusicRadar that the non-studio setting in Braintree forced a limited equipment setup and pushed the sessions toward songwriting rather than gear accumulation.

Dead Oceans described the Charm as a collaborative entity rather than a fixed band. The label's release notes identified Jenkins as a returning collaborator who handled much of the project, Batmanglij as a co-producer, Keivon Mehdi Hobeheidar as a contributor on bass and cello, Jay Flew as a multi-instrumentalist involved in early writing sessions, and Emerson's wife Hunter Lombard as a guitarist.

== Release ==
Dead Oceans released "Eden" as a single on November 13, 2025. Emerson announced the album on January 21, 2026, alongside "Jupiter and Mars", which was released as the second single. The title track was issued as another single with a performance video on February 19, 2026. The album was released on March 20, 2026, through Dead Oceans.

== Music and lyrics ==
Reviewers described Written into Changes as a song-based expansion of Emerson's earlier electronic work. MusicRadar called the album Balearic synth-pop and said it featured production from Jenkins and Batmanglij. Resident Advisor described it as a reinvention that expands the Charm's dream-pop sound into bigger and fuller songs. Pitchfork described it as a set of spectral love songs and misty dream pop. Dom Lepore of Treble described the album as indie pop with a livelier sound indebted to 1980s and 1990s dream pop and Balearic alternative dance.

Emerson told MusicRadar that bass was a priority on the album and connected that focus to her experience in DJ booths and club sound systems. She also discussed the use of vocal processing, valve distortion, wavetable synthesis, a Prophet-6, and a Roland SH-2000 during the sessions. Dead Oceans described the final work as band-driven, groove-heavy, and dance-adjacent, with songs that changed shape across the recording process.

Critics discussed several individual tracks. Pitchfork highlighted "Eden", "Jupiter and Mars", "I Don't Want to Fight", and "How Dare This Beer" as examples of Emerson's more specific songwriting and brighter production. John Amen of Beats Per Minute described "Eden" as combining funk, synth-pop, and slapping bass; he also wrote about the title track's melody and dance-oriented beat, the atmosphere of "Jupiter and Mars", and the bassline in "God Damn (Finito)". Paul Simpson of AllMusic wrote that the album's production favored lightly funky breakbeats and bright synth melodies linked to early-1990s alternative dance. He described "Jupiter and Mars" and "Happy Birthday" as hook-driven tracks, "God Damn (Finito)" as more groove-forward, and "Country Mouse" as recalling 1980s pop anthems.

== Critical reception ==
Professional ratings
Aggregate scores
| Source | Rating |
|---|---|
| Metacritic | 81/100 |
Review scores
| Source | Rating |
| Beats Per Minute | 84% |
| Clash | 8/10 |
| The Line of Best Fit | 8/10 |
| Paste | B+ |
| Pitchfork | 8.1/10 |

Written into Changes received positive reviews from music critics. Metacritic assigned the album a score of 81 out of 100 based on eight critic reviews, indicating "universal acclaim", and categorized all eight reviews as positive.

Shaad D'Souza of Pitchfork wrote that the album made Emerson's dream-pop approach bigger and bolder than on & the Charm, with more detailed songwriting and brighter arrangements. Amen gave the album a score of 84% for Beats Per Minute and called it a well-paced pop record that showed Emerson's control over varied styles.

Tobias Furlong of the Line of Best Fit gave the album a score of 8 out of 10, writing that the album presented Emerson as a more fully realised songwriter and highlighted "Eden", "Jupiter and Mars", the title track, and "Earth Alive". Ghadirian gave the album 8 out of 10 for Clash, describing it as a dream-pop record that also drew from 1980s pop, club music, and more alternative sounds. In Paste, Matt Mitchell gave the album a B+ and wrote that it was more varied than & the Charm, with references to dance-punk, jangle pop, gothtronica, twee, and alternative rock.

Simpson wrote for AllMusic that Written into Changes improved on & the Charm and showed Emerson's growth as a pop songwriter. Lepore wrote in Treble that the album placed Emerson's voice at the front of textural guitar-pop arrangements while retaining elements of her techno background. Resident Advisor's Vrinda Jagota described the record as self-assured and evidence of Emerson's continuing stylistic changes, while also judging some songs as less exploratory than her earlier work. Consequence selected the album for its March 2026 staff picks and later ranked it number 31 on its list of the best albums of 2026 so far; Paste ranked it number 24 on its midyear list, the Guardian included it in its midyear best-albums feature, and Pitchfork included it in its rolling best-music list for 2026.

== Charts ==
Written into Changes reached number 99 on the Official Albums Sales Chart and number 30 on the Official Album Downloads Chart.

Chart performance for Written into Changes
| Chart (2026) | Peak position |
|---|---|
| UK Albums (Official Charts) | 99 |
| UK Album Downloads (Official Charts) | 30 |
| UK Record Store (Official Charts) | 26 |
| UK Independent Albums (Official Charts) | 37 |

== Track listing ==
Track titles and lengths are adapted from Bandcamp.

Written into Changes track listing
| No. | Title | Length |
|---|---|---|
| 1. | "Eden" | 4:07 |
| 2. | "Jupiter and Mars" | 3:13 |
| 3. | "Happy Birthday" | 3:53 |
| 4. | "Written into Changes" | 3:17 |
| 5. | "Wooden Star" | 4:07 |
| 6. | "God Damn (Finito)" | 5:16 |
| 7. | "How Dare This Beer" | 2:48 |
| 8. | "Country Mouse" | 4:02 |
| 9. | "I Don't Want to Fight" | 3:07 |
| 10. | "Earth Alive" | 3:16 |
| Total length: | | 37:06 |

== Personnel ==
Credits are adapted from Bandcamp, Dead Oceans, MusicRadar, and AllMusic.

- Avalon Emerson - vocals, lyrics, melodies, composition, drum programming, synthesizer, production
- Nathan Jenkins - production, additional production, composition, drum programming, synthesizer, background vocals
- Rostam Batmanglij - production, composition
- Jay Flew - bass, guitar, synthesizer, composition
- Keivon Mehdi Hobeheidar - bass, cello, composition
- Hunter Lombard - guitar
- Sam Breathwick - guitar
- Andrew Maury - mixing
- Nathan Boddy - mixing
- Matt Colton - mastering
