= & the Charm =

Studio album by Avalon Emerson
- Released: April 28, 2023
- Genre: Electronic; dream pop; synth-pop
- Length: 39:00
- Label: Another Dove; One House
- Producer: Avalon Emerson; Bullion

Avalon Emerson chronology
Eternal September (2022)	& the Charm (2023)	Written into Changes (2026)

& the Charm (also known as Avalon Emerson & the Charm) is the debut studio album by American electronic music producer Avalon Emerson, released on April 28, 2023, through Another Dove and One House Records. It was co-produced by English producer Bullion and received acclaim from critics.

== Background ==
Emerson began working on the album during the COVID-19 pandemic in 2020 at her Los Angeles home with wife Hunter Lombard, and then traveled to London to co-produce the album with English producer Bullion (Nathan Jenkins). Emerson created a side-project band called the Charm with Lombard, Bullion, and friend Keivon Hobeheidar to attribute the album to.

== Critical reception ==
Professional ratings
Aggregate scores
Source	Rating
Metacritic	80/100
Review scores
Source	Rating
Clash	8/10
MusicOMH	4/5 stars
NME	4/5 stars
Pitchfork	8.0/10
Uncut	7/10
The Wire	4/5 stars

& the Charm received a score of 80 out of 100 on review aggregator Metacritic based on seven critics' reviews, indicating "generally favorable" reception. Josh Crowe of Clash called it "a distinct strain of synth-pop that takes inspiration from avant-pop auteurs" that "still features snippets of sound linked to her live sets, but crucially the LP focuses on a new kind of songcraft and features Emerson's voice". Uncut wrote that "Bullion's smooth, rounded sound burnishes what is a dynamic collection of songs", while The Wire felt that "& the Charm will find favour with anyone into Cocteau Twins, dreamy bedroom synthpop and anything Balearic. 'Entombed in Ice' feels nostalgic but fresh, Emerson's vocals floating effortlessly overhead".

Pitchfork's Anna Gaca commented that "the lucid dream-pop ditties of & the Charm take in the misty-eyed gaze of Japanese city pop, the slow-mo fireworks of shoegaze, the gentle sea spray of Balearic house, the jangly collage aesthetic of Saint Etienne". Ben Devlin of MusicOMH found it to be "decidedly less club-oriented than her previous work, focusing more on songcraft and Emerson's ethereal vocals" with the tracks "hav[ing] a whimsical feel to them, at times borrowing from shoegaze and at other times disco, old-school electro and 2-step garage". Ben Jolley of NME felt that while most of the album "consists of incredibly catchy, radio-friendly pop songs" it is "on the whole sonically softer than her solo releases" and several tracks "still retain a club-friendly undercurrent". Sophie McNulty of Resident Advisor described the album as "musically soft and floaty, although there's a dark tint to her lyrics".

Exclaim! ranked it the 17th best album of 2023, with the publication's Alex Hudson writing that "when the vibes are heavenly, the clear-eyed lyrics and sweaty dance pulse keep & the Charm anchored here on Earth". Gorilla vs. Bear ranked it the 19th best album of the year, while Pitchfork ranked it the 30th best.

== Track listing ==
& the Charm track listing
No.	Title	Length
1.	"Sandrail Silhouette"	4:29
2.	"Entombed in Ice"	3:12
3.	"A Vision"	4:02
4.	"Astrology Poisoning"	3:39
5.	"The Stone"	2:35
6.	"Dreamliner"	5:13
7.	"Hot Evening"	4:01
8.	"Karaoke Song"	3:32
9.	"A Dam Will Always Divide"	8:53
Total length:		39:00
