= Rotem Sivan =

Israeli-born jazz guitarist and composer based in New York City

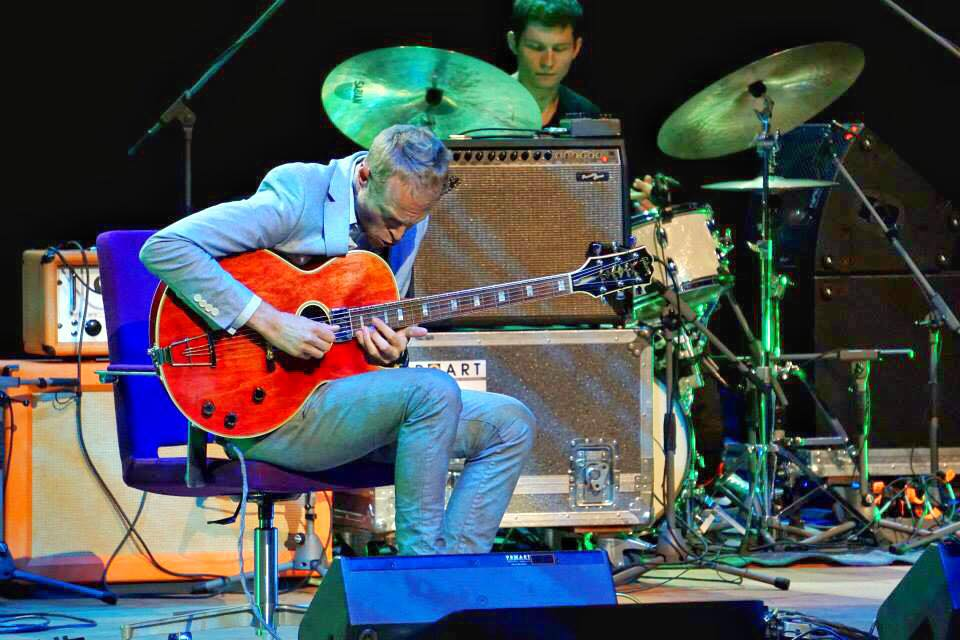
Rotem Sivan performing in Kraków, Poland

Rotem Sivan (Hebrew: רותם סיון; born in Jerusalem, Israel) is a jazz guitarist and composer living in New York City.

== Education ==
Sivan graduated from the Buchmann-Mehta School of Music at Tel Aviv University with a degree in classical composition before moving to New York City in 2008 to study at The New School for Jazz & Contemporary Music.

== Music ==
Sivan has released five studio albums. In 2013, he released his first album, Enchanted Sun, on SteepleChase Records.

His second album, For Emotional Use Only, was released in 2014 on Fresh Sound New Talent Records. The album received 4.5 stars in Down Beat magazine, calling Sivan "a remarkable talent and a welcome new voice on the scene". The New York Times critic Ben Ratliff wrote, "He plays a lot of notes. But he is quiet: almost always quieter than someone with this much training and musicality tends to be, and this is what makes him more than a very good young guitar player."

In 2015, Sivan released his third album, A New Dance, again on Fresh Sound New Talent Records.

In 2017, Sivan released his fourth album, Antidote, with Aima Records. The album featured Gracie Terzian in Sivan's cover version of "Over the Rainbow". The album had an alternative version of the track "For Emotional Use Only".

In 2018, Sivan released his fifth studio album, My Favorite Monster, featuring collaborations with Gracie Terzian, Sophia Urista and Cliche. In contrast to previous albums, My Favourite Monster contains an eclectic group of influences outside of jazz including R&B, hip-hop and North Indian music. A sample of Mahatma Gandhi's 1931 speech at Kingsley Hall was used on the track "Knives B", a re-interpretation of the track "Knives" from the album Antidote.

In 2025, Sivan collaborated with Belgian producer Poldoore on the track "Soliloquy Interlude", which appeared on Poldoore's album Chroma Dream.

Sivan has performed with world-renowned musicians, including Peter Bernstein, Ari Hoenig, Ben Street, Gracie Terzian, and Ferenc Nemeth and regularly performs in New York City's top venues such as Smalls, Birdland, The Jazz Gallery, The Bar Next Door and The Blue Note. He performs frequently with his trio at festivals all around the world.
