= Balkan Bump =

American musician, producer, and ethnomusicologist

- Born: Will Magid
- Origin: Oakland, California
- Genres: Electronic; dance; funk
- Instrument: Trumpet
- Label: Lowtemp
- Website: www.balkanbump.com

Will Magid, known professionally as Balkan Bump is an American trumpet player, producer, and ethnomusicologist based in Oakland, California. Signed to electronic producer Gramatik's label Lowtemp, Balkan Bump's music interweaves electronic production and live instrumentation.

== Early life ==
Magid grew up in Palo Alto, where his father tech journalist Larry Magid would often bring home new electronics and games, inspiring an early interest in technology. He began playing trumpet at age 10 and went on to play with the SFJazz High School All-Stars Big Band, with which he opened for Herbie Hancock and performed at Lincoln Center. Magid attended college at UCLA where he obtained a degree in ethnomusicology.

== Career ==
=== Early career ===
After stints leading a 15-piece afrobeat band in Southern California and touring as a keyboardist with Boston indie rock band Mount Auburn, Magid moved to San Francisco, allured by the city’s burgeoning dance music scene. There he formed Will Magid Trio, who blended live instruments with electronic elements and performed regularly at Cafe Du Nord among other Bay Area venues. He also formed the eleven-piece group Alligator Spacewalk which included members of the San Francisco-based Jazz Mafia collective, with whom he released two albums in 2016 and 2017. During this time, Magid toured and collaborated with Bonobo, Pretty Lights, Beats Antique, Erykah Badu, Talib Kweli, Kenny Burrell, and Solomon Burke.

=== 2017-present: Balkan Bump EP ===
Magid launched his project Balkan Bump in 2017, whose name pays tribute to the brass bands integral to the local traditional music of the Balkans. Magid attracted the attention of Gramatik, who signed him to his Lowtemp label and collaborated with him alongside Talib Kweli for Balkan Bump's first single release "Aymo" in October 2017. The song was included on Gramatik's Re:Coil, Pt. I EP and featured in Porsche's 2020 Super Bowl ad. After releasing his second single "Irfan" in December, Magid released his self-titled EP under the Balkan Bump moniker in March 2018. In April, Magid released a remix EP for the single "Aymo" via Lowtemp as well as the single "Give Me Something to Funk" in August.

Magid has also collaborated on several tracks with Belgian producer Poldoore.

== Musical style ==
Balkan Bump's music has been classified as "future balkan" and "electronic funk" for its use of live instruments, world influences, and electronic production. Magid likens the project's unique style to his ancestors' immigration across Europe, ultimately assimilating in California. His affinity for West African influences originated at UCLA, where he was introduced to Nigerian musician Babá Ken Okulolo through his son who was also studying ethnomusicology there.

== Performances ==
Magid played his first performance as Balkan Bump at Gramatik's 2017 New Year's Eve show at Terminal 5 in New York City. Since then he's toured with Gramatik on several occasions including: Spring 2018 on his Re:Coil Part I tour alongside Haywyre, fall 2018 alongside Beats Antique and Clozee, and fall 2019. Balkan Bump has performed at a number of music festivals including Bonnaroo, Electric Forest, and Joshua Tree Fall Music Festival as well as a guest appearance at Coachella in 2019. In April 2020 he performed online at Virtually Lucid, an online version of Lucidity festival.
