= Chinese Man =

French trip hop band

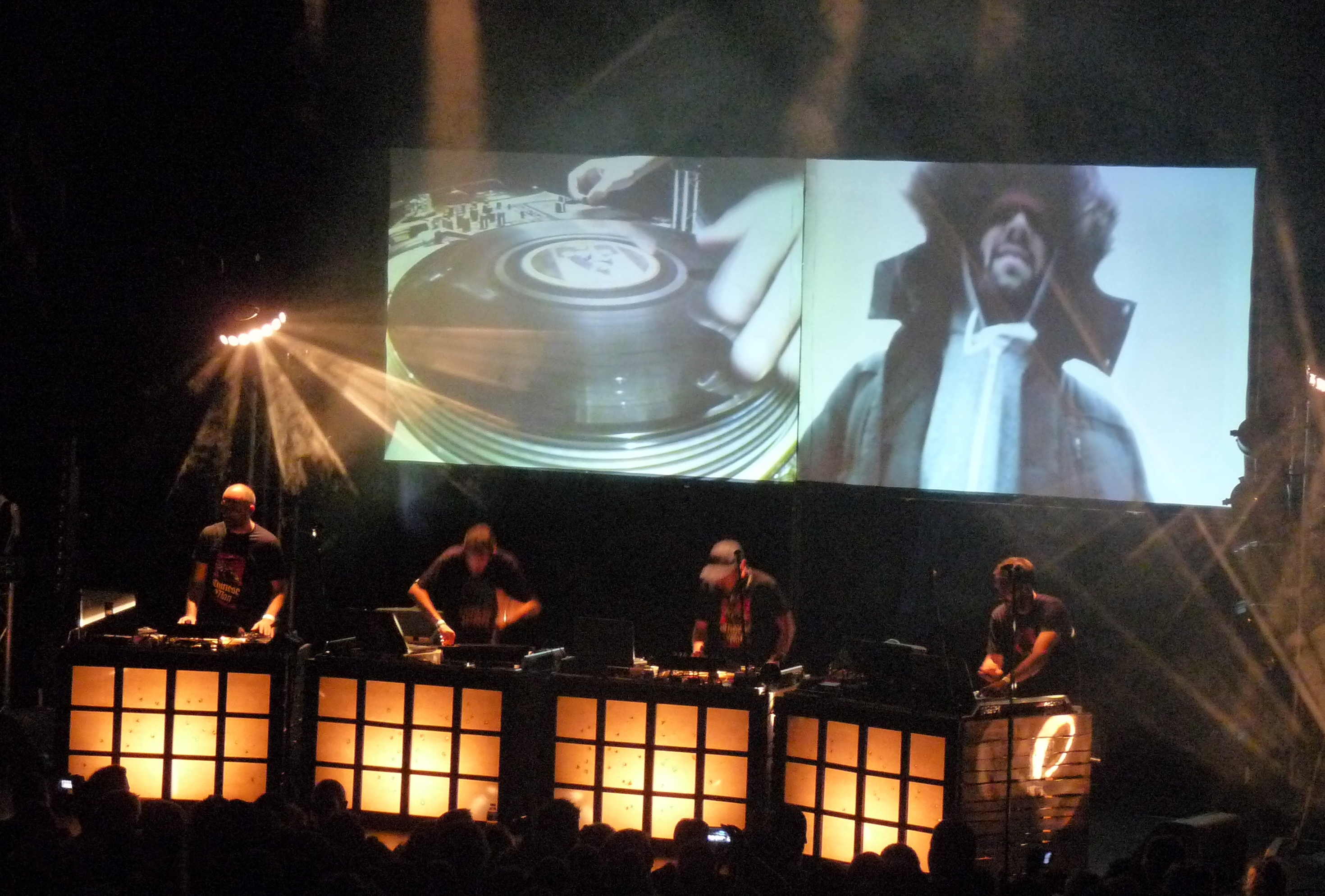
The band Chinese Man performing live in Marseille.

Chinese Man is a French trip hop band formed in 2004 and originally from Aix-en-Provence, Provence-Alps-French Riviera.

== History ==
They are influenced by hip hop, funk, dub, reggae and jazz.

Chinese Man is composed of DJ Marseille Zé Mateo and High Ku and beatmaker SLY. Beatmakers Leo le Bug and Le Yan also revolve around the group and participate in the composition of several pieces. Frequent live additions to the crew include Taiwan MC, Youthstar and ASM (Green T & FP). The audiovisual content for which they are well-known is produced by Fred&Annabelle, and VYZ Team. The group's song "I've Got That Tune" was chosen by Mercedes-Benz for its promotional campaign and by the 35th French Film Festival in Hong Kong as its theme.

Chinese Man Records is a record label run by the band, based in Marseille.

== Culture ==
The group has explained that Chinese Man is the name of the first track the collective produced together in 2004. The track got its name from a vocal sample saying Chinese Man, and they kept that name for the band and for the related label Chinese Man Records (a.k.a. CMR).

== Discography ==
=== Albums ===
- 2005 : The Bootlegs Sessions
- 2007 : The Groove Sessions Volume 1
- 2009 : The Groove Sessions Volume 2
- 2011 : Racing with the Sun
- 2012 : Remix with the Sun
  1. "The Mourning Son" (feat. Jeru the Damaja)
  2. "One Past" (OBF Remix)
  3. "Saudade" (feat. Femi Kuti / Liliboy)
  4. "Stand!" extended version (feat. Plex Rock)
  5. "Racing with the Sun" (Deluxe Remix)
  6. "Down" (Scratch Bandits Crew Remix): used by "Le Before" of Le Grand Journal of Canal + in its Title sequence
  7. "In My Room" (feat. Chali 2Na)
  8. "Get up" (feat. Lush One / Plex Rock / Ex-I) (LeYan & Tomapam Remix)
  9. "Ta Bom" (feat. Tumi / General Electriks)
  10. "Miss Chang" (feat. Taiwan MC / Cyph4) (Tha Trickaz Remix)
  11. Racing with the Sun (Iration Steppas Remix)
  12. "In My Room" (DJ Suv Remix)
  13. "The King" (The Libra Priest Suite) (DJ Simbad Remix)
- 2012 : Live à la Cigale
- 2014 : The Groove Sessions Volume 3
- 2015 : Sho-Bro
- 2015 : The Journey
- 2017 : Shikantaza
  1. "Shikantaza"
  2. "Liar" (feat. Kendra Morris & Dillon Cooper)
  3. "Maläd"
  4. "Step Back"
  5. "The New Crown" (feat. A-F-R-O, A.S.M & Taiwan MC)
  6. "Escape"
  7. "Stone Cold" (feat. Mariama)
  8. "Modern Slave" (feat. R.A. The Rugged Man)
  9. "Warriors"
  10. "What You You Need" (feat Vinnie Dewayne, Myke Bogan & Tre Redeau)
  11. "Wolf"
  12. "Blah!" (feat Youthstar, Taiwan MC & Illaman)
  13. "Golden Age"
  14. "L'aurore"
  15. "Anvoyé"
  16. "Goodnight"
- 2020 : "The Groove Sessions Volume 5"
- 2024 : "We've Been Here Before"
- 2025: "We've Been Here Before 2"

=== Maxi vinyls Chinese Man ===
- 2004 : The Pandi Groove EP, 4 tracks
- 2006 : The Bunni Groove EP, 6 tracks including "I've Got That Tune"
- 2007 : The Indi Groove EP, 5 tracks
- 2008 : The Groove Sessions Vol.1, 14 tracks
- 2009 : Hong Kong Dragon Speaking EP, 4 tracks
- 2009 : The Groove Sessions Vol.2, 16 tracks
- 2011 : Miss Chang EP, 4 tracks
- 2012 : Racing + Remix with the Sun, 26 tracks
- 2014 : Once Upon a Time EP
- 2014 : The Groove Sessions Vol.3, 14 tracks

=== Maxi vinyls solos (label Chinese Man Records) ===
- 2008 : SLY - Small City Music EP, 8 tracks
- 2008 : Leo Le Bug - Le Pudding EP, 4 tracks
- 2010 : Leo Le Bug / LeYan - Split EP, 8 tracks
- 2012 : Deluxe - Polishing Peanuts, 6 tracks
- 2013 : Deluxe - Daniel, 4 tracks
- 2013 : Deluxe - The Deluxe Family Show, 12 tracks
- 2013 : LeYan & TomaPam - Sputnik Moment, 45T 2 tracks
