= Motivation (Carly Rae Jepsen song) =

Single by Carly Rae Jepsen

from the album Day and Night
- Released: August 21, 2026
- Genre: Dance-pop
- Length: 3:53
- Label: Schoolboy; Interscope
- Songwriters: Carly Rae Jepsen; Cole M.G.N.
- Producers: Cole M.G.N.; Kyle Shearer

Carly Rae Jepsen singles chronology
"Don't Leave Me on the Dance Floor" (2026)	"Motivation" (2026)	"Versailles" (2026)

Music video
- "Motivation" on YouTube

"Motivation" is a song by Canadian singer-songwriter Carly Rae Jepsen. It was released through Schoolboy and Interscope Records on August 21, 2026, as the fourth single from her eighth studio album, Day and Night (2026). She co-wrote the song with her husband Cole M.G.N., who produced it with Kyle Shearer.

== Composition ==
"Motivation" is a club-oriented dance-pop and pop song. Jepsen got the idea for it while visiting her hometown, where the sound of leaves crunching beneath her feet inspired its rhythm. She described it as "[her] little family anthem" and said it became a way for her to make peace with her family's passionate nature and high expectations.

== Release and music video ==
"Motivation" was released as the fourth single from Jepsen's eighth studio album, Day and Night, following "On Wires," "After All", and "Don't Leave Me on the Dance Floor". It serves as the latest preview of the album and the second track from its Night side.

The music video was directed by Caio Vieira and filmed in Paris. It stars fashion designer, actress, model, and former RuPaul's Drag Race contestant Gigi Goode. The video concludes with a brief appearance by Jepsen's baby.

== Critical reception ==
MXDWN's Lana Overton praised "Motivation" for its sleek, expansive production and emotional depth, noting that it "sounds liberated" despite addressing complicated feelings. She also highlighted the song's acknowledgment of Jepsen's family dynamics and praised her continued evolution beyond "Call Me Maybe".

== Personnel ==
Credits were adapted from Tidal.

- Carly Rae Jepsen – lead and background vocals, songwriter
- Ivy Rae – vocals
- Cole M.G.N. – producer, songwriter, drums, engineer, keyboard, recording engineer, synthesizer
- Kyle Shearer – producer, drums
- Nate Cyphert – songwriter
- Ruairi O'Flaherty – mastering engineer
- Tom Norris – mixing engineer

== Charts ==
Weekly chart performance
Chart (2026)	Peak position
Japan Hot Overseas (Billboard Japan)	17
Nicaragua Anglo Airplay (Monitor Latino)	6

== Release history ==
Release dates and formats
Region	Date	Format(s)	Label	Ref.
Various	August 21, 2026	Digital download; streaming	Schoolboy; Interscope	
