= Don't Leave Me on the Dance Floor =

2026 single by Carly Rae Jepsen

Single by Carly Rae Jepsen

from the album Day and Night
- Released: August 7, 2026
- Genre: Dance-pop
- Length: 3:13
- Label: Schoolboy; Interscope
- Songwriters: Carly Rae Jepsen; Arthur Besnainou; Christopher J. Baran
- Producers: CJ Baran; Arthur Besnainou

Carly Rae Jepsen singles chronology
"After All" (2026)	"Don't Leave Me on the Dance Floor" (2026)	"Motivation" (2026)

Music video
- "Don't Leave Me on the Dance Floor" on YouTube

"Don't Leave Me on the Dance Floor" is a song by Canadian singer-songwriter Carly Rae Jepsen. It was released through Schoolboy and Interscope Records on August 7, 2026, as the third single from her eighth studio album, Day and Night (2026). She co-wrote the song with its producers CJ Baran and Arthur Besna.

== Composition ==
"Don't Leave Me on the Dance Floor" has been described as 1970s pop and disco-leaning dance-pop. Jepsen described the song as the 'sister' to "Surrender My Heart", the opening track from her sixth studio album, The Loneliest Time (2022).

== Music video ==
The accompanying music video, directed by Jeremy O. Harris in his directorial debut, stars American actor Alden Ehrenreich, with American actress Olivia Washington appearing in background roles. An alternate music video, titled the "Late Night Version", was released to Jepsen's YouTube channel on August 12, 2026.

== Charts ==
=== Weekly charts ===
Weekly chart performance
Chart (2026)	Peak position
Bolivia Anglo Airplay (Monitor Latino)	9
Japan Hot Overseas (Billboard Japan)	11
Kazakhstan Airplay (TopHit)	43
Lithuania Airplay (TopHit)	34
New Zealand Hot Singles (RMNZ)	29

=== Monthly charts ===
Monthly chart performance
Chart (2026)	Peak position
Kazakhstan Airplay (TopHit)	46
Lithuania Airplay (TopHit)	49
