= Pet Sounds: In the Key of Dee =

Remix album by Bullion
- Released: 2007
- Genre: Mashup, instrumental hip hop
- Length: 24:44
- Label: Self-released
- Producer: Bullion

Bullion chronology
Pet Sounds: In the Key of Dee (2007)	You Drive Me To Plastic (2011)

Pet Sounds: In the Key of Dee is a mashup album by United Kingdom-based record producer Bullion, released for free online download in 2007. It is a tribute to American rapper/producer J Dilla and the Beach Boys' 1966 album Pet Sounds. According to hip hop producer Questlove, Dilla had been a fan of the Pet Sounds album.

== Reception ==
Gorilla vs. Bear described it as a "more adventurous version of The Grey Album, but with J Dilla and the Beach Boys standing in for Jay-Z and the Beatles". Pitchfork called it "a surprisingly deft, quasi-mash-up record", while The Guardian wrote that the album "highlighted the beauty of the music by chopping it up into byte-size chunks and putting it back together in fabulous new shapes". In 2013, Fact magazine placed Pet Sounds: In the Key of Dee in its list of the essential instrumental hip hop albums of the last 15 years.

== Track listing ==
No.	Title	Length
1.	"Pet Sounds"
2.	"Sloppy Jay D"
3.	"Let's Go Away For a While"
4.	"I Just Wasn't Made for These Times"
5.	"Here Today"
6.	"Caroline, No"
7.	"God Only Knows"
8.	"You Still Believe in Dee"
9.	"I Know There's an Answer"
10.	"Wouldn't It Be Nice"
11.	"That's Not Dee"
12.	"I'm Waiting for the Day"
13.	"Don't Talk (Close Your Eyes)"
Total length:		24:44
