= Day and Night (Carly Rae Jepsen album) =

Studio album by Carly Rae Jepsen
- Released: September 18, 2026
- Studios: LemonTree (Highland Park); Traxton (Stockholm); TEN (Stockholm); The Store (Los Angeles); Valentine (Los Angeles); Rodeo (Venice); Cow Pow (Stockholm); Vamp (Los Angeles); Blue Meets Green (London)
- Length: 85:29
- Labels: Schoolboy; Interscope
- Producers: CJ Baran; Arthur Besna; Billboard; Bullion; Cole M.G.N.; Wille Enblad; John Hill; Elias Kapari; Magnus Lidehäll; Vincent Pontare; Kyle Shearer

Carly Rae Jepsen chronology
The Loveliest Time (2023)	Day and Night (2026)

Singles from Day and Night
- 1. "On Wires" Released: June 26, 2026; 2. "After All" Released: July 16, 2026; 3. "Don't Leave Me on the Dance Floor" Released: August 7, 2026; 4. "Motivation" Released: August 21, 2026; 5. "Versailles" Released: September 18, 2026

Day and Night is the eighth studio album by the Canadian singer-songwriter Carly Rae Jepsen, released on September 18, 2026, by Schoolboy and Interscope Records. It is Jepsen's first double album, containing 24 tracks on the discs labeled Day and Night.

The album was preceded by the singles "On Wires", "After All", "Don't Leave Me on the Dance Floor", and "Motivation". On October 9, 2026, Day and Night was reissued as Day and Night (Continued). The reissue adds eight more tracks from the album's studio sessions, four into each respective disc.

In support of the album, Jepsen announced the Day and Night Tour on October 1, 2026. The tour is scheduled to visit 26 cities across the United States and Canada, running from April 15 to May 29, 2027.

== Background and recording ==
After the 2023 release of The Loveliest Time, Jepsen was sometimes seen in the recording studio during 2024 and 2025, which included a session with British producer A. G. Cook. In the weeks leading up to the announcement of her new album, Jepsen posted cryptic messages on social media featuring images accompanied by locations, dates, and times. Images included photographs of artifacts and objects, as well as lines resembling lyrics from the upcoming record.

== Composition ==
Day and Night's first half is described by The Line of Best Fit as "raw", featuring live instrumentation and elements of 1970s-inspired "psychedelic pop", while the second half is "exploratory and intense", resembling a "sleek, synth-driven dance-pop sound". As a whole, the collection is set to capture a "blurred, dreamlike sense of time", in which "nights stretch into mornings" and "days dissolve into nights".

== Release and promotion ==
Jepsen announced Day and Night on June 22, 2026, scheduled for release as a 24-track double album. Twelve tracks are intended to represent daytime, while the remaining twelve represent nighttime. The album was recorded with collaborators Tavish Crowe, Kyle Shearer, Nate Cyphert, and Jepsen's husband Cole M.G.N., along with Noonie Bao, Patrik Berger, Markus Krunegård, and Pontus Winnberg.

"On Wires" was released as the lead single on June 26, 2026, followed by the second single "After All" on July 16, 2026 and the third single "Don't Leave Me on the Dance Floor" on August 7, 2026. "Motivation" was released as the album's fourth single on August 21, 2026. "Versailles" was released as the fifth single alongside the album on September 18, 2026. The album's release was scheduled to be followed by a headlining performance at the All Things Go Music Festival in New York City on September 27, marking her first live appearance for the year. The New York City edition of the All Things Go Music Festival was cancelled that year due to severe weather conditions. Following the cancellation, Jepsen organised a 'One Night Only' concert at Irving Plaza scheduled for the same date where she then debuted several new songs from the album. On October 1, 2026, Jepsen announced the Day and Night Tour, with dates in Canada and the U.S. in April and May 2027.

== Critical reception ==
Professional ratings
Aggregate scores
Source	Rating
AnyDecentMusic?	7.6/10
Metacritic	82/100
Review scores
Source	Rating
AllMusic	4.5/5 stars
Dork	4/5 stars
The Line of Best Fit	8/10
MusicOMH	4/5 stars
NME	3.5/5 stars
Paste	B+
Pitchfork	7.5/10
Rolling Stone	4/5 stars
Slant Magazine	3.5/5 stars
The Times	3/5 stars

According to the review aggregator Metacritic, Day and Night received "universal acclaim" based on a weighted average score of 82 out of 100 from thirteen critic scores. As of September 19, 2026, it marks the highest-rated album of Jepsen's career. AnyDecentMusic? gave the album a score of 7.6 out of 10 based on fourteen reviews.

AllMusic's Heather Phares complimented the length of Day and Night, believing it allowed Jepsen to "take the kind of risks she often left for companion releases". In a review for Dork, Esme Sharp praised the album for Jepsen's vocals and its overall production. She did however note that it could benefit from a shorter length of time. Sam Franzini of The Line of Best Fit described the album as Jepsen's "most creative and far-reaching work to date". He further referred to the Day material as artsy in a psychedelic manner, while the Night material was classified as more club-driven. Rolling Stone's Jaeden Pinder gave the album a four-out-of-five star review, referring to it as a "dissertation on love". She further noted the album's music and lyrical content, noting it as a "travelogue". In his review for MusicOMH, Steven Johnson noted how the album reflected the personal changes in Jepsen's life following the release of 2023's The Loveliest Time, which he felt enhanced the music on Day and Night. Paste called the album "an especially rewarding headphones listen", and mentioned that "Everything sounds cared for, as if placed into the stereo field with tweezers."

In a mixed review, Slant Magazine writer Michael Savio opined that while Day and Night was Jepsen's most "sonically adventurous" album, he felt the album was also a "little unwieldy". Similarly, Nick Levine from NME felt the album was a grower in comparison to her previous works, noting that what it lacked in originality it made up for in "conceptual clarity". For his review, Will Hodgkinson of The Times felt that the length was to its detriment, opining that the album was not Jepsen's "spiritual home". Echoing Hodkingson's remarks about the album's length, Pitchfork's contributing editor Marissa Lorusso felt that a more condensed release would sustain the album's concept better, believing that the album lacked "razor-sharp hooks" that Jepsen is known for in her previous releases.

== Track listing ==
Disc one track listing
No.	Title	Writer(s)	Producer(s)	Length
1.	"After All"	Carly Rae Jepsen; Kyle Shearer; Nate Cyphert	Shearer	4:12
2.	"Habits of Creatures"	Jepsen; Patrik Berger; Pontus Winnberg; Magnus Lidehäll	Lidehäll	2:57
3.	"Versailles"	Jepsen; Elias Kapari; Noonie Bao; Markus Krunegård	Kapari	3:14
4.	"On Wires"	Jepsen; Shearer; Cyphert	Shearer	3:23
5.	"Blue Skies"	Jepsen; Winnberg; Lidehäll; Berger; Vincent Pontare	Lidehäll; Pontare	2:29
6.	"Burning Heart"	Jepsen; Winnberg; Pontare; Finn Keane	Pontare; Wille Enblad	3:30
7.	"Wild Child"	Jepsen; Shearer; Cyphert	Shearer	3:49
8.	"Good Fine Alright"	Jepsen; Winnberg; Berger; Lidehäll; Cole M.G.N.	Lidehäll	4:09
9.	"Something Tragic"	Jepsen; John Hill; Cole M.G.N.	Hill; Cole M.G.N.	2:57
10.	"Soft"	Jepsen; Oliver Lundström; Sophia Somajo	Lundström	3:03
11.	"Lonely Side of the Bed"	Jepsen; Shearer; Mathieu Jomphe-Lépine; Max Bellavance; Nate Campany	Billboard; Shearer	3:30
12.	"Just a Little Walk on the Moon"	Jepsen; Cole M.G.N.	Cole M.G.N.	3:48
Total length:				40:01

Continued disc one track listing
No.	Title	Writer(s)	Producer(s)	Length
13.	"Reaching for a Star"	Winnberg; Berger; Tavish Crowe	Lidehäll	3:43
14.	"Sixteen and Rising"	Jepsen; Cole M.G.N.	Cole M.G.N.	4:24
15.	"Wedding Season"	Jepsen; Shearer; Jomphe-Lépine; Bellavance; Campany	Billboard; Shearer	2:58
16.	"Lullaby"	Jepsen; Cole M.G.N.	Cole M.G.N.	3:09
Total length:				55:14

Disc two track listing
No.	Title	Writer(s)	Producer(s)	Length
1.	"Never Let a Good Thing Die"	Jepsen; Shearer; Cyphert	Shearer	5:19
2.	"Amalfi Coast"	Jepsen; Berger; Winnberg; Lidehäll	Lidehäll	2:59
3.	"Patience Power Passion"	Jepsen; Shearer; Jomphe-Lépine; Cyphert	Billboard; Shearer	3:29
4.	"Don't Leave Me on the Dance Floor"	Jepsen; Arthur Besnaïnou; Christopher J. Baran	CJ Baran; Arthur Besna	3:12
5.	"Motivation"	Jepsen; Cole M.G.N.; Cyphert	Cole M.G.N.; Shearer	3:53
6.	"You Don't Know How It Feels"	Jepsen; Shearer; Cyphert; Crowe	Shearer	3:14
7.	"Near or Far"	Jepsen; Berger; Winnberg; Lidehäll; Erik Satie	Lidehäll	3:17
8.	"Diver"	Jepsen; Crowe	Bullion	3:06
9.	"Hold Me to the Light"	Jepsen; Shearer; Cyphert	Shearer	3:56
10.	"That's Just Me"	Jepsen; Hill; Cole M.G.N.	Hill; Cole M.G.N.	3:42
11.	"No Labels, I Love You"	Jepsen; Cole M.G.N.; Joe Kirkland	Cole M.G.N.	3:40
12.	"Super Sage"	Jepsen; Shearer; Cyphert; Cole M.G.N.	Billboard; Shearer	4:01
Total length:				45:28

Continued disc two track listing
No.	Title	Writer(s)	Producer(s)	Length
13.	"Yes"	Jepsen; Casey Manierka-Quaile; Jomphe-Lépine; Simon Wilcox	Billboard; Casey MQ	3:21
14.	"Muscle Memory"	Jepsen; Berger; Winnberg; Lidehäll	Lidehäll	2:43
15.	"Love Depressed"	Jepsen; Svante Halldin; Jakob Hazell; Annie Schindel	Jack & Coke; Shearer; Billboard	3:00
16.	"In Pure Faith"	Jepsen; Shearer; Cyphert	Shearer	2:53
Total length:				1:00:51

=== Notes ===
- "Reaching for a Star" and "Yes" were released as bonus tracks on the Japanese edition of the album. "Yes" was also released as sole bonus track on the Yes digital edition of the album.
- The Day and Night (Continued) bonus tracks will be issued as a standalone EP, exclusively for Record Store Day Black Friday 2026.

== Personnel ==
These credits are adapted from Jepsen's website and Tidal.

=== Disc one: Day ===
==== Musicians ====
- Carly Rae Jepsen – vocals, background vocals
- Kyle Shearer – bass, keyboards, synthesizers, guitar (tracks 1, 4, 7, 11, 14–15); additional instruments (tracks 1, 4); drums, percussion (tracks 1, 7); background vocals (track 1)
- Nate Cyphert – background vocals (tracks 1, 4, 7)
- Caleb Crosby – drums, percussion (track 4)
- Nami – additional programming (track 4)
- Emily Shearer – background vocals (track 7)
- Juan Solorzano – guitar (track 7)
- Callum Maudsley – guitar (track 7)
- Liam Bornovski – pedal steel (track 7)
- Eric Hagstrom – drums, percussion (tracks 8–9, 12)
- Patrik Berger – guitar (track 8)
- Cole M.G.N. – keyboards, synthesizers (tracks 9, 12, 14, 16); drum programming (tracks 9, 12), guitar (tracks 12, 14, 16), bass (tracks 12, 14), drums (track 14)
- John Hill – bass, guitar, drum programming (track 9)
- Tommy King – keyboards, synthesizer (track 9)
- Joe Harryson – bass (track 9)
- Oliver Lundström – drums, percussion, bass, keyboards, synthesizers, guitar (track 10)
- Mathieu Jomphe-Lépine – drums, percussion, keyboards, synthesizers, guitar (tracks 11, 15)
- Max Bellavance – drums, percussion (tracks 11, 15)
- Andrew Aged – guitar (track 12)
- Julius Rodriguez – Fender Rhodes (track 12)
- Pontus Winnberg – keyboards, synthesizers (track 13)
- Jon Sosin – bass, guitar (track 16)
- Brian Richburg Jr. – drums, percussion (track 16)
- Tavish Crowe – pedal steel (track 16)

==== Technical ====
- Kyle Shearer – recording, engineering (tracks 1, 4, 7, 11, 14–16); additional recording (track 5)
- Magnus Lidehäll – recording, engineering (tracks 2, 13)
- Elias Kapari – recording, engineering (track 3)
- Robert Marvin – recording, engineering (track 4)
- Vincent Pontare – recording, engineering (tracks 5–6)
- Cole M.G.N. – recording, engineering (tracks 8–10, 12, 14); additional vocal recording (track 6)
- Andy Petr – recording, engineering (track 9)
- Jon Yeston – recording, engineering (track 9)
- Oliver Lundström – recording, engineering (track 10)
- Mathieu Jomphe-Lépine – recording, engineering (tracks 11, 15)
- Mike Malchicoff – recording, engineering (track 14)
- Kyle Parker Smith – recording, engineering (track 16)
- Manny Marroquin – mixing (tracks 1, 4, 8–9)
- Tom Elmhirst – mixing (tracks 2–3, 5, 7, 13)
- Geoff Swan – mixing (track 6)
- Anthony Dolhai – mixing (track 10)
- David Wrench – mixing (tracks 11, 14, 15)
- Ramiro Fernandez-Seoane – mixing assistance (tracks 1, 4, 8–9)
- Francesco Di Giovanni – mixing assistance (tracks 1, 4, 8–9)
- Matt Cahill – mixing assistance (track 6)
- Ruairi O'Flaherty – mastering

=== Disc two : Night ===
==== Musicians ====
- Carly Rae Jepsen – vocals, background vocals
- Mathieu Jomphe-Lépine – drums, percussion, bass, keyboards, synthesizers (tracks 3, 12–13); guitar (track 12)
- Kyle Shearer – drums, percussion, bass, keyboards, synthesizers (tracks 3, 12); drum programming (track 5), guitar (track 12)
- Cole M.G.N. – keyboards, synthesizers (tracks 5, 10–11); drum programming (track 5, 10), guitar (tracks 10–11)
- Ivy Rae – "Twinkle Little Star" vocals (track 5)
- Nate Cyphert – background vocals (tracks 6–7)
- Bullion – background vocals, keyboards, synthesizers, drum programming (track 10)
- John Hill – keyboards, synthesizers, guitar, drum programming (track 10)
- Midi Jones – drums, percussion, bass, guitar (track 11)
- Casey Manierka-Quaile – drums, percussion, bass, keyboards, synthesizers (track 13)
- Pontus Winnberg – keyboards, synthesizers (track 14)
- Jakob Hazell – drums, percussion, bass, keyboards, synthesizers, guitar (track 15)
- Svante Halldin – drums, percussion, bass, keyboards, synthesizers, guitar (track 15)
- Petter Axelsson – viola (track 15)

==== Technical ====
- Kyle Shearer – recording, engineering (tracks 1, 3, 6, 8–9, 12, 16)
- Magnus Lidehäll – recording, engineering (tracks 2, 7, 14)
- CJ Baran – recording, engineering (track 4)
- Arthur Besna – recording, engineering (track 4)
- Cole M.G.N. – recording, engineering (tracks 5, 10–11)
- Nathan Jenkins – recording, engineering (track 8)
- John Hill – recording, engineering (track 10)
- Andy Petr – recording, engineering (track 10)
- Jon Yeston – recording, engineering (track 10)
- Midi Jones – recording, engineering (track 11)
- Mathieu Jomphe-Lépine – recording, engineering (track 12)
- Casey Manierka-Quaile - recording, engineering (track 13)
- Jack & Coke – recording, engineering (track 15)
- Tom Norris – mixing
- Ruairi O'Flaherty – mastering

== Charts ==
Chart performance
Chart (2026)	Peak position
Australian Albums (ARIA)	31
Belgian Albums (Ultratop Flanders)	59
Belgian Albums (Ultratop Wallonia)	106
Canadian Albums (Billboard)	59
French Physical Albums (SNEP)	79
German Albums (Offizielle Top 100)	45
German Pop Albums (Offizielle Top 100)	17
Japanese Download Albums (Billboard Japan)	61
Japanese Top Albums Sales (Billboard Japan)	77
Japanese Western Albums (Oricon)	25
Scottish Albums (Official Charts)	14
Spanish Albums (Promusicae)	81
UK Albums (Official Charts)	86
US Billboard 200	29

== Release history ==
Release dates and formats
Date	Formats	Editions	Labels	Ref.
September 18, 2026	CD; LP; music download; streaming	Standard	Schoolboy; Interscope	
September 18, 2026	CD	Japanese	Universal Music Japan	
September 23, 2026	Music download	Yes Edition	Interscope	
October 9, 2026	Music download; streaming	Continued	Schoolboy; Interscope	
November 27, 2026	LP	Continued	Schoolboy; Interscope	
