= Day and Night Tour =

2027 concert tour by Carly Rae Jepsen

- Tour by Carly Rae Jepsen
- Location: North America
- Associated album: Day and Night
- Start date: April 15, 2027
- End date: May 29, 2027
- Legs: 1
- No. of shows: 27
- Supporting acts: Carol Ades; Sarah Kinsley

Carly Rae Jepsen concert chronology
- The So Nice Tour (2022–23); Day and Night Tour (2027)

The Day and Night Tour is an upcoming concert tour by Canadian singer-songwriter Carly Rae Jepsen, in support of her eighth studio album, Day and Night (2026). The tour is scheduled to begin on April 15, 2027, in Edmonton, Alberta, and conclude on May 29, 2027, in Montreal, Quebec.

== Background ==
In June 2026, Jepsen announced her eighth studio album, Day and Night, a 24-track double album divided into two sections, Day and Night. In an interview with NME, Jepsen explained that the two halves developed from different musical directions. The Day material incorporated more organic instrumentation and elements influenced by her interest in folk music, while the Night material developed into a darker, more experimental and synth-driven sound.

Jepsen released Day and Night on September 18, 2026. The album contains 24 songs, with 12 tracks on each half, and was preceded by the singles "On Wires", "After All", "Don't Leave Me on the Dance Floor", and "Motivation".

On October 1, 2026, Jepsen announced the Day and Night Tour, her first major headlining tour following the release of the album. The announcement confirmed a 26-date North American itinerary beginning in Edmonton and concluding in Montreal. The tour is promoted by Live Nation Entertainment.

The announcement was notable for the scale of several venues on the itinerary. In addition to returning to established concert venues across Canada and the United States, Jepsen is scheduled to headline Madison Square Garden for the first time. The tour also includes her first headlining appearances at the Kia Forum and Red Rocks Amphitheatre.

Artist presales are scheduled to begin October 6, 2026, with general ticket sales scheduled to begin October 8. Tickets are being sold through venues and ticketing partners, with Live Nation serving as the tour's promoter.

== Tour dates ==
List of 2027 concerts
Date (2027)	City	Country	Venue	Opening act(s)
April 15	Edmonton	Canada	Northern Alberta Jubilee Auditorium	Carol Ades
April 16	Calgary	Canada	Event Centre at Grey Eagle Resort & Casino	Carol Ades
April 18	Vancouver	Canada	Orpheum	Carol Ades
April 19	Portland	United States	Arlene Schnitzer Concert Hall	Carol Ades
April 21	San Francisco	United States	Bill Graham Civic Auditorium	Carol Ades
April 22	Inglewood (Note: Labeled as Los Angeles in promotion material.)	United States	Kia Forum	Carol Ades
April 23	San Diego	United States	Gallagher Square	Carol Ades
April 25	Morrison	United States	Red Rocks Amphitheatre	Carol Ades
April 27	Salt Lake City	United States	The Complex	Carol Ades
April 30	Paradise (Note: Labeled as Las Vegas in promotion material.)	United States	Chelsea Ballroom	Carol Ades
May 1	Phoenix	United States	Arizona Financial Theatre	Carol Ades
May 5	Irving	United States	The Pavilion at Toyota Music Factory	Sarah Kinsley
May 7	Austin	United States	Moody Amphitheater	Sarah Kinsley
May 8	Houston	United States	713 Music Hall	Sarah Kinsley
May 10	Nashville	United States	The Truth	Sarah Kinsley
May 11	Cumberland (Note: Labeled as Atlanta in promotion material.)	United States	Coca-Cola Roxy	Sarah Kinsley
May 12	Charlotte	United States	Skyla Credit Union Amphitheatre	Sarah Kinsley
May 14	Washington, D.C.	United States	The Anthem	Sarah Kinsley
May 15	New York City	United States	Madison Square Garden	Sarah Kinsley
May 18	Philadelphia	United States	The Met	Sarah Kinsley
May 19	Boston	United States	MGM Music Hall at Fenway	Sarah Kinsley
May 21	Chicago	United States	Chicago Theatre	Sarah Kinsley
May 22	Detroit	United States	Fox Theatre	Sarah Kinsley
May 25	Toronto	Canada	History	Sarah Kinsley
May 26	Toronto	Canada	History	Sarah Kinsley
May 28	Ottawa	Canada	History	Sarah Kinsley
May 29	Montreal	Canada	MTELUS	Sarah Kinsley
