= Gracie Terzian =

American jazz musician

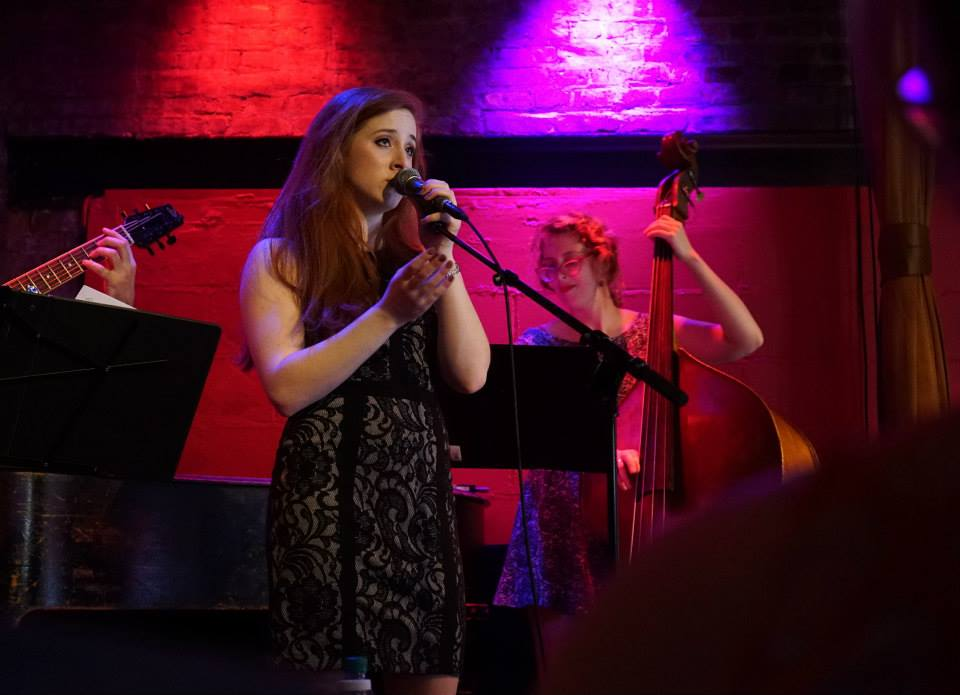
Gracie Terzian performing at Rockwood Music Hall on June 14, 2015.

Grace Benedict Paine Terzian, better known as Gracie Terzian, is a singer-songwriter, musician, producer, and actress based in New York City. She is a native of the Washington, D.C. area, and frequently returns there to work and perform.

== Early life ==
Terzian is of partial Armenian descent, the daughter of Philip Terzian and Grace Paine. She was born in Providence, Rhode Island but grew up in Oakton, Virginia and graduated from the University of Virginia with a B.A. in Drama.

During her second year at the University of Virginia, she played the title role in a production of Evita at the drama department. In 2011, she received a grant from the Undergraduate Award for Arts Projects program to study aerial acrobatics in New York City and was named an Atlantic Coast Conference International Academic Collaborative Fellow in Creativity and Innovation. She has worked professionally as an actor at many theatres, such as Ford's Theatre, the Shakespeare Theatre Company, the Folger Theatre, and The Kennedy Center.

== Music ==
Her debut EP, 'Saints and Poets,' came out on May 5, 2015 and quickly became the #3 Jazz Album on iTunes and #23 on the Billboard jazz charts. Ted Gioia, jazz critic and author of History of Jazz, called her "a genuine talent." Terry Teachout, author of Duke: A Life of Duke Ellington, wrote "Don't let the cool, sophisticated surface of Saints and Poets fool you: Gracie Terzian is a deep-dyed romantic who tells her tales of modern love with quiet delicacy and an inborn musicality that's impossible to overlook. Of such debuts are great careers made."

She is known for playing unusual ukuleles, such as the harp ukulele and electric ukulele. She plays jazz ukulele with a unique tuning, which she has stated makes it "easier to find jazz harmonies in close proximity to one another on the fretboard."
