= Avalon Emerson =

American electronic music producer and DJ

- Born: San Francisco, U.S.
- Origin: Arizona, U.S.
- Genres: Electronic
- Labels: Another Dove; AD 93; Studio !K7; Spectral Sound
- Website: avalonemerson.com

Avalon Emerson (born November 10, 1988) is an American electronic music producer and DJ. Emerson DJs at clubs such as Berghain in Berlin and has played at festivals like Coachella, Sónar, Primavera Sound and Pitchfork Music Festival.

== Biography ==
Emerson was born in San Francisco and raised in a musical household in Arizona. Along with Nine Inch Nails and Cocteau Twins, her mother played a lot of synth pop in the house—"Propaganda, Frankie Goes to Hollywood, Depeche Mode". Her father plays guitar, and the two of them along with her sister would record using Cakewalk, sparking an early interest in music production.

At 19, Emerson moved to San Francisco where she worked as a software developer and began to make electronic dance music, DJ and throw warehouse parties in the SoMa district of the city, before moving to Berlin in 2014.

In 2016 she released 'The Frontier' on Young Turks sublabel Whities (AD 93 as of 2020) around the same time she began to regularly DJ in Panorama Bar in Berghain, as well as clubs and festivals throughout Europe. Resident Advisor named 'The Frontier' one of the top 10 Tracks of the Decade. Emerson has also released records on Ghostly International imprint Spectral Sound and in 2020 contributed to !K7’s DJ-Kicks series, with her mix featuring tracks from Oceanic, Tranceonic, and her own cover of Magnetic Fields' 'Long Forgotten Fairytale'.

In 2018 Emerson collaborated with friends to launch Buy Music Club, a site dedicated to building and sharing lists of music on Bandcamp.

Emerson’s productions are known for their melodic-heavy synths and heavy percussion, pulling from a wide history of pop and electronic music. Emerson is also known for her bootleg-style unofficial remixes dubbed “Cybernedits” (formerly Cybernetic Edit Subscription Service) that she provided as free-download zip files until 2016. Officially Emerson has remixed Slowdive, Christine and the Queens, Robyn, Four Tet, Austra, Lena Platonos and more. As a DJ Emerson is known for spanning many sounds, tempos and genres, often heavily looping and re-editing multiple layers of songs during her sets, which at Panorama Bar have lasted more than 11 hours.

== Personal life ==
Emerson is lesbian.

== Discography ==
=== Studio albums ===
- & the Charm (2023, Another Dove)
- Written into Changes (2026, Dead Oceans)

=== Mix albums ===
- DJ-Kicks: Avalon Emerson (2020, !K7 Records)

=== EPs ===
- Pressure / Quoi! (2014, Icee Hot Records)
- Church of SoMa (2014, Spring Theory Records)
- Let Me Love & Steal / Honest Gangster (2014, Spring Theory Records)
- shtum 009 Constantly My Cure (2015, shtum)
- Whities 006 the Frontier / 2000 Species of Cacti (2016, Whities)
- Narcissus in Retrograde (2016, Spectral Sound)
- Whities 013 One More Fluorescent Rush / Finally Some Common Ground (2017, Whities)
- 040 Rotting Hills / Winter and Water / One Long Day Till I See You Again (2017, AD 93)
- Eternal September with Anunaku as A+A (2022, AD 93)

=== Remixes ===
- 2015: HNNY – "Solsidan" (Avalon Emerson Second System Mix)
- 2017: Bwana – "Three Way Is the Hard Way" (Avalon Emerson Remix)
- 2017: Lena Platonos – "Lego" (Avalon Emerson Remix)
- 2017: Octo Octa – "Adrift" (Avalon Emerson's Furiously Awake Version)
- 2017: Slowdive – "Sugar for the Pill" (Avalon Emerson's Gilded Escalation)
- 2018: Christine and the Queens – "The Walker" (Avalon Emerson's Balcony Mix)
- 2019: Four Tet – "Teenage Birdsong" (Avalon Emerson Scrub Jay Remix)
- 2020: Robyn – "Honey" (Avalon Emerson's Deep Current Reroll)
- 2020: Austra – "Anywayz" (Avalon Emerson's 14th Life Version)
- 2021: King Princess – "Pain" (Avalon Emerson's Half Dub)
