= Poldoore =

Belgian instrumental hip-hop artist

Poldoore (born Thomas Schillebeeckx) is a Belgian music producer and instrumental hip-hop artist. His work blends elements of hip-hop, jazz, soul, dub and electronic music. He has released multiple albums internationally, composed music for commercial campaigns and performed live across Europe and the United States.

== Early life and career ==
Schillebeeckx developed an early interest in music production by listening to artists such as Aim and DJ Shadow. In interviews, he has described how discovering that their music was largely sample-based led him to explore the original source material behind those recordings, which in turn shaped his own approach to music-making.

In the early 2010s, Schillebeeckx began releasing music under the name Poldoore. His early releases attracted attention within the instrumental hip-hop scene and led to coverage in international music publications such as Vice and Rolling Stone France.

== Musical style ==
Poldoore’s music is primarily instrumental and characterized by layered rhythms, melodic sampling and cinematic arrangements. His productions combine sampled material with live instrumentation and electronic processing.

In interviews, Poldoore has described aspects of his production approach, including the use of vintage analog equipment such as tape delays, spring reverbs and hardware synthesizers.

== Commercial and sound design work ==
In addition to his album releases, Poldoore has composed music for commercial campaigns. He created the soundtrack for The Journey, a promotional campaign for Sony's Xperia mobile phone, in collaboration with Emmy award-winning director Mateo Willis.

Poldoore’s music was also featured in connection with the Ian Urbina Outlaw Ocean Music Project, where his work was used for the Belgium section of the project which aimed to combine investigative journalism with music in order to raise awareness of human rights, labor and environmental abuses at sea.

Additionally, Poldoore has produced sound design and sample content for music production platforms, including Tracklib, Noiiz FL Studio and LANDR, where his sample packs are distributed to music producers around the world.

== Remixes ==
In addition to his original releases, Poldoore has contributed official remixes for other artists, including Wax Tailor and Emancipator.

== Collaborations ==
Poldoore has collaborated with a range of artists on officially released music. On his 2014 album The Day Off, he worked with hip-hop duo The 49ers on the track “Heard It All Before”.

On his 2016 album The Day After, Poldoore partnered with Jamaican vocalist Sleepy Wonder of Thievery Corporation on the track “This Road”.

He also worked with A State of Mind on the tracks “A Brand New Day” from the album Mosaic and “Hourglass” from Soft Focus and collaborated with Balkan Bump on the track “Home Again”, also featured on Soft Focus.

In 2022, Poldoore partnered with Blockhead on the collaborative release Welcome Mat / The End Is Nigh.

Poldoore's 2025 album Chroma Dream features "Soliloquy Interlude", a collaboration with jazz guitarist Rotem Sivan.

Additionally, Poldoore has worked with musician and producer Wouter Van Belle, who contributed to the recordings for his albums Soft Focus and Chroma Dream.

== Live performances ==
Poldoore has performed live in multiple countries including Belgium, France, Spain, Germany, Greece, Turkey, Romania, Switzerland and the United States, among others. His live appearances include performances at international music festivals such as Dour Festival in Belgium, the Akbank Jazz Festival in Turkey, Plisskën Festival in Greece and Gilles Peterson’s Worldwide Festival in France.

== Reception and recognition ==
In 2014 and 2015, Poldoore was nominated for a Red Bull Elektropedia Award, a Belgian music award recognising artists in electronic music.

In early coverage of his career, Poldoore was also included among Belgian artists to watch in 2015 by the newspaper De Morgen.

Poldoore’s work has additionally been covered by international music publications, including Rolling Stone France, Vice, XLR8R, DaMusic, ThisSongIsSick and The Daily Frequency.
