= A State of Mind (band) =

ASM
- Origin: Frankfurt am Main, Hesse, Germany
- Genres: Alternative hip hop, funk
- Years active: 2007-present
- Label: Chinese Man Records
- Members: Benjamin Bambach; Maik Schindler; Adam Simmons

A State of Mind (abbreviated as ASM) is an international hip hop act, their music is considered alternative hip hop, but draws influences from other genres like jazz and funk. They consist of two MCs, Benjamin Bambach alias Green T or GT Lovecraft from Canada and Maik Schindler (German pronunciation: [maɪk ˈʃɪndlɐ]) alias FP respectively Funk E. Poet from Germany, as well as producer/beatmaker Adam Simmons alias Rhino or Fade from England. Since 2019 they are signed to Chinese Man Records, a French indie label run by band Chinese Man.

== History ==
The band members met in Frankfurt am Main, where they went to school together. They soon started listening to hip-hop music and were influenced especially by old-school hip hop.

They first gained international recognition for collaborating with Wax Tailor and made an appearance on his albums Hope & Sorrow and In The Mood For Life in 2007 and 2009. Soon after they released their first EP Pre-Emptive Nostalgia which they had produced together with Skrein.

ASM's first solo-album Platypus Funk was released in 2010, followed by their second album Crown Yard in 2011. In 2015 they released their most ambitious and successful project to date, the album The Jade Amulet, a narrative album set in the fictional ancient kingdom of Vabaria. The story is spun around Shalim, last of the clan Tan Suo, spoken by FP. Green T guides from a narrative perspective through the album, other artists like MF Doom as the tyrant King Dumile, Mattic as the king's son Rongon The Conqueror as well as other artists (Mighty Diamonds, Laura Mayne, Kain The Poet, Astrid Engberg, and Lilliboy Deluxe) set characters into music. The album was realized with the help of an orchestra. Additionally they created a beer, which shall resemble Belko Brew, a fictional beverage from Vabaria, and a comic book for the story.

In 2016 ASM turned to their roots in boom bap again, leading to their EP String Theory. In 2017 the groups MC's accompanied Chinese Man, a Trip hop trio from Marseilles, on their Shikantaza-tour, following their signing to Chinese Man Records in 2019. Soon after ASM released their fourth album Colour Wheel under the label's name. In the following year they released their latest project to date, Blue Cocoon. Emerged in times of COVID-19 lockdown, it depicts an artistically sophisticated, soul influenced way of Hip Hop music. Between 2021 and 2022 ASM produced and aired Ōrigin and Juice, their second EP in a row, which is accompanied by a YouTube series, focusing on European cuisine and natural wine.

ASM has collaborated with Belgian producer Poldoore on the tracks A Brand New Day, featured on Poldoore's album Mosaic and Hourglass, featured on Poldoore's album Soft Focus.

== Discography ==
=== Albums ===
- 2010: Platypus Funk
- 2011: Crown Yard
- 2015: The Jade Amulet
- 2019: Colour Wheel

=== EP's ===
- 2009: Pre-Emptive Nostalgia
- 2016: String Theory

=== Singles ===
- 2010: "Root to the Fruit" (featuring Wildchild)
- 2013: "Higher Horse"

As the Jade Amulet

- 2015: "Masking" (featuring MF Doom)

As Colour Wheel

- 2019: "Grape"
- 2019: "Azure"
- 2019: "Burgundy"

As Blue Cocoon

- 2020: "Return of the Sabretooth"
- 2020: "Survival Manifesto"
- 2020: "You Don't Know"
- 2020: "Blue Cocoon"

As Ōrigin & Juice

- 2021: "Shank Em"
- 2021: "Dumplings"
- 2021: "Tapass"
- 2022: "Efcharisto"
- 2022: "Give A Schnitz"
- 2022: "Pork Belly"
