= On Wires =

2026 single by Carly Rae Jepsen

Single by Carly Rae Jepsen

from the album Day and Night
- Released: June 26, 2026
- Genre: Psychedelic pop, pop rock
- Length: 3:23
- Label: Schoolboy; Interscope
- Songwriters: Carly Rae Jepsen; Nate Cyphert; Kyle Shearer
- Producer: Kyle Shearer

Carly Rae Jepsen singles chronology
"More" (2026)	"On Wires" (2026)	"After All" (2026)

Music video
- "On Wires" on YouTube

"On Wires" is a song by Canadian singer-songwriter Carly Rae Jepsen. It was released on June 26, 2026, through Schoolboy and Interscope Records, as the lead single from her eighth studio album, Day and Night (2026). The song's producer, Kyle Shearer, performed its instruments. He also co-wrote the track with Jepsen and Nate Cyphert. "On Wires" was released alongside the announcement of the album.

== Critical reception ==
Alex Krinsky of Consequence of Sound said of the song, "The song opens with a sprightly piano flourish, and only moments pass before the complexity and quality of production become apparent". Alex Hudson of Exclaim! called the song "a bold collision of sounds" that "soars heavenward on the chorus" and described it as "mysterious and full of surprises". Hudson also positively remarked on Jepsen's vocal work saying, "Jepsen's voice ascends with god-like reverb amidst dramatic blasts of guitar distortion". Robin Murray of Clash also positively commented on Jepsen's vocals saying "the vocal can be both coy and carnal, flirtatious and positively feral". Chris DeVille of Stereogum described the song as having a "casually luxurious '70s afternoon vibe".

== Music video ==
On the day of release, a music video was uploaded alongside the single directed by Caio Viera. The visuals for the music video were supposed to be different than what was released, with Jepsen saying in an interview, "I pictured chasing this man through the streets of New York but then, by the time we shot the video I was like, 'How do I chase a man through the streets when I'm six months pregnant?' It would look like I'm looking for child support!".

== Credits and personnel ==
- Carly Rae Jepsen – lead vocals, songwriter
- Nate Cyphert – songwriter, vocals
- Kyle Shearer – songwriter, producer, recording, tracking, guitar, bass, keyboards, synths
- Caleb Crosby – drums, percussion
- Robert Marvin – recording
- Manny Marroquin – mixing
- Ruairl O'Flaherty – mastering
