= Sekuoia =

Sekuoia is the moniker of the Danish electronic musician and producer Patrick Alexander Bech Madsen (born 1992). Sekuoia's first EP Trips was released in 2011 and started a small buzz in the electronic music scene in Denmark and Germany.

== Career ==
Born in Düsseldorf, and with a childhood in Detroit, Sekuoia first moved to Denmark at an age of 8. In his teen years, he built himself a studio in his parents basement, where he would go on to make his ambient and lingering electronica. In 2012, he attended music school in Engelsholm, where he met Smerz, Chinah and Code Walk.

Sekuoia's music has been described as; combining the organic with the electronic in a dreamy meltdown, consisting of dry beats, synth washes and copy/pasted vocals conjure echoes of both dubstep and atmospheric ambient. He has been chosen to support acts like Inc, Washed Out, MØ and WhoMadeWho, as well as remixing Tomas Barfod. Sekuoia has played in more than 20 European countries, including appearances at festivals like Roskilde Festival, Amsterdam Dance Event, Eurosonic Festival, Trans Musicales, Spot Festival, and by:larm

== Discography ==
- Trips (EP, 2011)
- Faces (EP, 2012)
- Reset Heart (EP, 2015)
- flac (Studio album, 2016)
