= After All (Carly Rae Jepsen song) =

2026 single by Carly Rae Jepsen

Single by Carly Rae Jepsen

from the album Day and Night
- Released: July 16, 2026
- Length: 4:12
- Label: Schoolboy; Interscope
- Songwriters: Carly Rae Jepsen; Kyle Shearer; Nate Cyphert
- Producer: Kyle Shearer

Carly Rae Jepsen singles chronology
"On Wires" (2026)	"After All" (2026)	"Don't Leave Me on the Dance Floor" (2026)

Music video
- "After All" on YouTube

"After All" is a song by Canadian singer-songwriter Carly Rae Jepsen. It was released through Schoolboy and Interscope Records on July 16, 2026, as the second single from her eighth studio album, Day and Night (2026). She co-wrote the song with Nate Cyphert and its producer Kyle Shearer.

"After All" blends a soulful sound with disco-house influences while lyrically exploring married life and motherhood. Aerin Moreno directed an accompanying music video, which features a pregnant Jepsen wandering through a house following a dinner party. "After All" was praised for its production and dance-oriented sound.

== Release and music video ==
Following the release of "On Wires", the lead single of her eighth studio album, Day and Night, "After All" was released to digital and streaming through Schoolboy and Interscope Records on July 16, 2026, as the second single.

Directed by Aerin Moreno, the accompanying music video depicts a pregnant Jepsen wandering through a cluttered dining room following a dinner party. The video was filmed prior to the birth of her son in March 2026.

== Composition ==
Written by Jepsen, Kyle Shearer, and Nate Cyphert, and produced by Shearer, "After All" begins with a smooth, domestic-themed atmosphere before shifting into a disco-house-tuned chorus. The song adopts a soulful sound inspired by artists such as Jungle and Khruangbin, while featuring skittering drums, delicate piano, and layered choir vocals that accompany its light, lively chorus. It runs for 4 minutes and 12 seconds. The lyrics depict scenes from married life and motherhood through imagery such as terracotta tiles, late-night fireworks, and an apartment overlooking the ocean.

== Critical reception ==
Lyndsey Havens of Billboard described "After All" as contrasting with the rock-influenced "On Wires", praising its sleeker production, Jepsen's falsetto chorus, and groovy instrumental break that gives the song a dancefloor-ready feel.

== Personnel ==
Credits were adapted from Tidal.

- Carly Rae Jepsen – lead vocals, background vocals, songwriter
- Kyle Shearer – producer, songwriter, background vocals, bass, drums, guitar, keyboards, percussion, synthesizers, recording engineer, engineer
- Nate Cyphert – songwriter, background vocals
- Manny Marroquin – mixing engineer
- Francesco Di Giovanni – assistant mixing engineer
- Ramiro Fernandez-Seoane – assistant mixing engineer
- Ruairi O'Flaherty – mastering engineer

== Charts ==
Weekly chart performance
Chart (2026)	Peak position
Japan Hot Overseas (Billboard Japan)	9

== Release history ==
Release dates and formats
Region	Date	Format(s)	Label	Ref.
Various	July 16, 2026	Digital download; streaming	Schoolboy; Interscope	
