= Grace Paine Terzian =

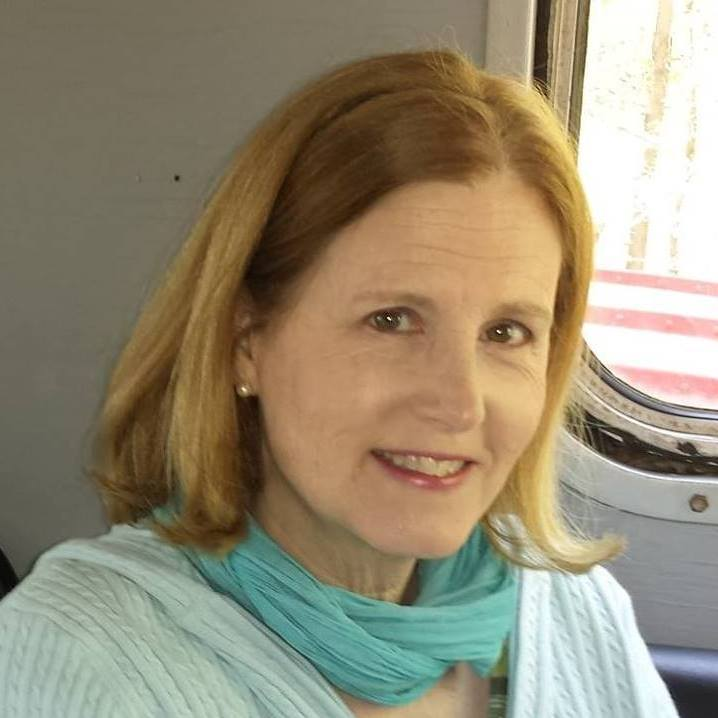
- Born: October 19, 1952 (age 73); Boston, Massachusetts, U.S.
- Education: B.A., 1974
- Alma mater: Williams College
- Employer: Institute for Humane Studies
- Title: Director of Marketing, Development
- Spouse(s): Philip Terzian, Oct. 20, 1979
- Children: William Thomas Hillman; Gracie Terzian
- Parent(s): Thomas Fite and Grace Hillman (Benedict) Paine

Grace Paine Terzian (born October 19, 1952) is Director of Marketing for Development for the Institute for Humane Studies.

Terzian previously served as Chief Communications Officer of MediaDC, the parent company of The Washington Examiner and The Weekly Standard. Prior to that, she was vice president for Communications of the Hudson Institute, managing Hudson's publications and website, public relations, and events.

She is the daughter of Thomas F. Paine Jr., M.D. a physician who was a pioneer in the study of the side effects of antibiotics, and Grace Benedict Paine.

Terzian was Phi Beta Kappa at Williams College, where she studied Art History and graduated in 1974.

Terzian has worked in a variety of publishing and public policy-oriented positions, including at The New Republic, the Chronicle of Higher Education, and Architectural Digest. During the 1990s and into the early 2000s, she worked at the Independent Women's Forum, where she was senior vice president, and was publisher of The Women's Quarterly. Immediately prior to working at the Hudson Institute, Terzian was executive director of the Allergy and Asthma Network Mothers of Asthmatics.

== Personal life ==
Married to Philip Terzian, and the mother of two, she lives in Fairfax County, Virginia.
