= Lena Platonos =

Greek experimental music composer and pianist

- Λένα Πλάτωνος
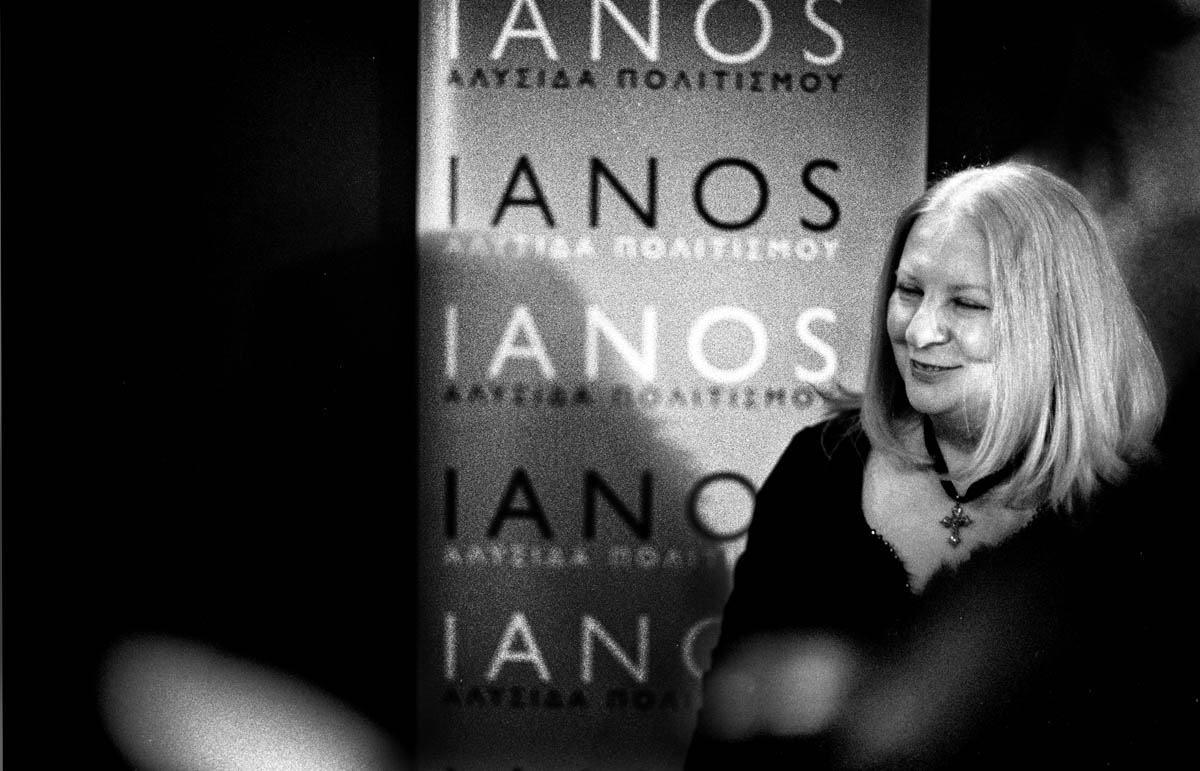
- Born: 21 October 1951 (age 74); Heraklion, Crete, Greece
- Education: Athens Conservatoire; Academy of Fine Arts Vienna
- Style: Electronic music

Lena Platonos (born 21 October 1951) is a Greek pianist and composer of electronic and art music. She took a leading role in the Athens electronic music scene of the 1980s, and her work has constituted a lasting inspiration for Greek electronic musicians in the subsequent decades. She is most known for her participation in the Hellenic Broadcasting Corporation's (ERT) children's musical show Lilipoupoli, as well as for her unique personal work.

== Early life ==
Born in Heraklion, Crete in 1951 (but raised in Athens), Platonos is the daughter of George Platon and Antigone Astrinaki. Her father George was a well-known composer and first pianist in the Greek National Opera. Lena started to play the piano at the age of two, and subsequently took lessons from her father.

== Studies ==
She studied at the Athens Conservatoire under the guidance of Phoebe Vallinda and Marika Papaioannou and became a professional pianist at the age of eighteen, while in 1963 she won First Prize in the Katie Papaioannou Contest. She departed with a scholarship for studies abroad, first at the Vienna Academy and then in Berlin, where she came into contact with rock, jazz and Eastern music. She returned to Greece during the course of the dictatorship and cooperated with Heracles Triantaphyllidis and his band DNA, going back to Berlin in 1975 and returning again finally in 1978. Together with her then-husband Dimitris Marangopoulos, she began to work with the Third Programme of the Hellenic Broadcasting Corporation (ERT), where she also became acquainted with Manos Hatzidakis who was at that time the director of the Third. She developed a long-standing professional and friendly relationship with him, and she took part in the production of the broadcast Lilipoupoli. Here, writing verses and music, her compositions are some of the most well-known songs of the broadcast, such as "Roza-Rozalia" and "The Dance of the Peas".

== Career ==
Her debut in recording began with the record Sabotage in 1981, which was created in cooperation with Marianina Kriezis and Savina Yannatou –with whom she had worked also in Lilipoupoli – and the singer Yiannis Palamidas. The record was considered in the Greek context as pioneering, as much for the composition and versification as also for the intensive use of the synthesizer –with which Platonos had begun to experiment for a short time before – for the first time in Greek recording. There followed the circulation of 13 poems by Kostas Karyotakis set to music, a work which had been completed before Sabotage, but circulated second at the insistence of the director of Lyra, Alekos Patsiphas. Next year the album Manos Hatzidakis '62 came out, with minimal electronic arrangements of 12 songs by the composer.

There followed three personal records which determined her mark on Greek electronic music and constituted a point of reference for future attempts: Sun Masks (1984), Gallop (1985), and Lepidoptera (1986). In these records Platonos turned entirely to electronic music and to experimental directions in form, orchestration and verse. Her compositions follow minimalistic motifs with intense use of keyboards, schematising carefully staged soundscapes. The voice, frequently passing through electronic filters, at times plays a central role – right up to the uniqueness in compositions of delivery – but may be used also like a simple instrument of accompaniment. Her verses, usually surrealistic in their expression, are nevertheless direct and touch on themes of daily routine and personal relationships, especially love and alienation, and are distinguished by their tenderness and at other times childlike innocence.

In between the above, circulated the record The Sound and its Errors with children's songs in verses by Gianni Rodari, while in 1986 Platonos worked with the other pioneers in electronic music in Greece Michalis Grigoriou and Vangelis Katsoulis in the work Music for keyboards. In 1989 the children's opera The Emperor’s Nightingale came out, based on the Andersen tale of the same name, and two more records of more subdued tones and dark style followed, To Spasimo Ton Pagon (The Breaking of the Ice) with Yiannis Palamidas in 1989, based around the piano and non-electronic instruments, and Mi Mou tous Kiklous Tarate (Do Not Disturb my Circles) in 1991. In 1990 Platonos cooperated with Dionysis Savvopoulos in live appearances and on the record Retrospection '63-'89 and in 1991 with Dimitra Galani on Myths of Europe, arranging songs of John Lennon, Kurt Weill among others.

After a period of abstention from recording and gradual distancing from publicity, Lena Platonos returned in 1997 with Breaths in cooperation with Savina Yannatou, a record with subduedly-toned love songs and orchestrations close to art music and jazz instead of electronic music. At the same time the collection Lena Platonos’ Blender came out with arrangements of her songs by well-known artists on the Greek electronic scene (Coti K, Constantinos Veta, Michalis Delta, ΙΟΝ, etc.), which enjoyed a particular flowering at that time. In 2000 the record The Third Doorway was released, with poems by Thodoros Poalas set to music, sung by Maria Farantouri. In March 2003 she presented her oeuvre in its entirety at a show in the Athens Concert Hall (Megaron Mousikis Athinon), the tickets for which were sold out.

In December 2005 the book My Words (ed. Odos Panos) was published with verses from her songs. In February 2008 CD-single I Loved You came out in 160,000 copies together with the Sunday edition of the newspaper Eleftherotypia (Kyriakatiki Eleftherotypia), while on 18 March 2008 her new record Diaries, of autobiographical character, came out with which she returned to electronic music. On 28 July 2008 at the Odeon of Herodes Atticus there was a retrospective concert for her work, where, apart from herself, Elli Paspalas, Martha Phridzilas, Constantinos Veta, and Yiannis Palamidas and Vassilikos (from Raining Pleasure) participated.

In 2010 followed a double disc with the live recording of the performance at the Pallas with the participation of her well-known collaborators Savina Yannatou and Yiannis Palamidas, while in December of the same year, Lena Platonos set poems of Constantine P. Cavafy to music for the performance which was given at the Pallas, directed by Dimitris Papaioannou, on the occasion of the 150 years from the birth of the Egyptian-Greek poet.

In October 2014 Lena Platonos set to music selected poems by George Chronas on the record Sacred Pain, with the participation of Pantelis Theocharidis and Melina Kanas.

In 2015 the album Gallop was rereleased by Dark Entries Records, drawing the attention of international press and distinguished non-Greek DJs. Songs like ‘Bloody Shadows from Afar’, ‘Witches’, and ‘Ruby Liqueur’ were heard from sets of Boiler Room and Beats in Space as far as Paris catwalks as soundtracks for fashion shows of the renowned house of Dior.

In 2015, Fact Magazine included Gallop in its list of the 25 best re-issues of the year in the world. The same year, Lena Platonos in her concert at the Onassis STEGI presented for the first time a cycle of songs in English with the title Hope is the thing with feathers. The song cycle was based on poetry by Emily Dickinson, and included the participation of Sissi Rada and Athina Routsi as singers, and Karyophyllia Karambeti as narrator, while the orchestration was by Lena Platonos and Sterios Tsirliagos. In January 2016 Lena Platonos composed another song, on lyrics by Eleni Photaki, and interpreted by Tania Tsanaklidou, for the performance ‘My name is Eva’, a work based on the life of Eva Koumarianou. The performance was shown at the Alcmene Theatre, under the direction of Antonis Boskoitis.

Later in 2016 the circulation of an EP from the DJ Red Axes with 4 remixes from the record ‘Galop’ is expected, while due to follow is also the recirculation of the record ‘Sun’s Masks’, once again from Dark Entries Records.

In 2017 Stathis Gourgouris, Professor of Comparative Literature and Society in Columbia University, in his book chapter 'Musical Poiesis, Erotic Cosmology, and Commodity Life: The Lena Platonos Phenomenon', acclaimed Platonos′ contribution to modern greek electronic music, comparing her to Laurie Anderson.

In 2021, the song cycle Hope is the thing with feathers was released as an album, and was followed by the compilation Balancers, an LP of previously unreleased material recorded between 1982-1985.

Lena Platonos has also written music for the theatre, ballet and television, as well as works of classical music. Apart from music, she is involved in painting and miniatures and has put her works on show from time to time, while she herself has created the covers for several of her records.

== Discography ==
- Sabotage (Lyra 1981, with Yannis Palamidas and Savina Yannatou, lyrics by Marianina Kriezi)
- Karyotakis – 13 Songs (Lyra 1982, with Savina Yannatou, poetry by Kostas Karyotakis)
- The '62 of Manos Hatzidakis (Lyra 1983, with Savina Yannatou, arrangements on compositions by Manos Hatzidakis)
- Sun Masks (Lyra 1984)
- The Sound and its Errors (Seirios 1985, with Savina Yannatou, based on texts by Gianni Rodari)
- Gallop (Lyra 1985, Dark Entries Records 2015 re-issue)
- Lepidoptera (Lyra 1986)
- The Emperor's Nightingale (Lyra 1989, children's opera, arrangement of the tale by Hans Christian Andersen)
- The Breaking of the Ice (Seirios 1989, with Yannis Palamidas)
- Do Not Disturb My Circles (Akti 1991, with Katerina Kouka and Katerina Nitsopoulou)
- Breaths (Lyra 1997, with Savina Yannatou)
- The Third Doorway (MINOS 2000, with Maria Farantouri, poetry by Thodoros Poalas)
- A Thousand and One Tunes (Lyra 2000, collection)
- I Loved You (Οdos Panos 2008, CD-single)
- Diaries (Odos Panos 2008)
- Lena Platonos – Concert at the Pallas (Lyra 2010)
- Kavafis – 13 Songs (Inner Ear Records 2010, with Yiannis Palamidas, poetry by C. P. Cavafy)
- Sacred Pain (Οdos Panos 2014, with Pantelis Theodoridis and Melina Kana)
- Thanato Thanaton... Patisas (Odos Panos 2018, with Yannis Palamidas)
- Balancers (Dark Entries 2021, previously unreleased material recorded 1982-1985)
- Hope Is The Thing With Feathers (We Are the Amp 2021, with Athina Routsi and Sissi Rada, poems by Emily Dickinson)
- 9 sto Fos (Panik Oxygen 2025, with Katerina Verdi, Dimitra Galani, Vassilikos, Aleka Kanellidou, Haris Alexiou, Savina Yannatou, Alkinoos Ioannidis and Foivos Delivorias, texts by Nikos Moraitis)

=== Participations ===
- Edo Lilipoupoli (Minos 1980)
- Music for Keyboards (Music Box 1987)
- Retrospection '63-'89, by Dionysis Savvopoulos (Polydor 1990)
- Myths of Europe, by Dimitra Galani (Minos 1991)
