= Philip Terzian =

American journalist

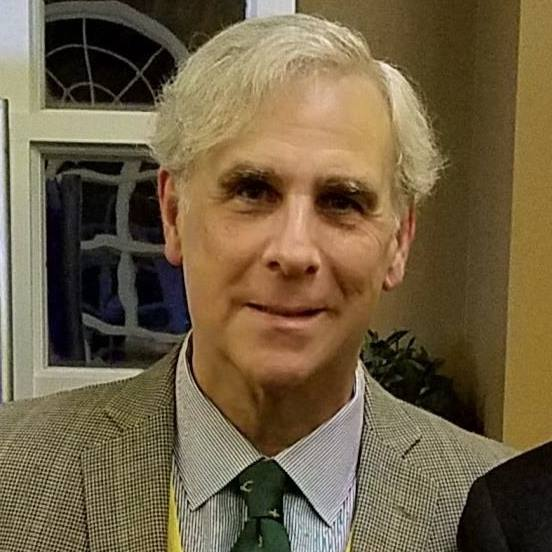
- Terzian in 2018
- Born: Philip Henry Terzian; July 5, 1950 (age 75); Kensington, Maryland
- Education: Villanova University B.A. 1973 (English); Exeter College, Oxford postgrad Modern History, 1976; Episcopal Theological Seminary in Virginia, Diploma in Theological Studies, 1995
- Employer: Semi-retired
- Political party: Republican
- Spouse(s): Grace Barrett Paine, Oct. 20, 1979
- Children: William Thomas Hillman, M.D. Grace Benedict Paine Terzian Emanuel
- Website: Philip Terzian

Philip Terzian (born 1950) is an American journalist and author. Since 2018, he has been a contributing writer for The Washington Examiner. Before its closing in December 2018, he was a senior writer at The Weekly Standard, a politics and culture magazine founded in 1995, where he was literary editor from 2005 to 2017. He is the author of Architects of Power: Roosevelt, Eisenhower, and the American Century, published by Encounter Books in 2010.

== Early life and education ==
Terzian is a native of Kensington, Maryland, the son of Louise (Anderson) Terzian, an attorney and probate court judge, and L. A. Terzian, a microbiologist. His maternal grandfather, Cecil Whitaker Anderson, was an executive at American Stores in Philadelphia. His paternal grandparents were Armenian immigrants. Terzian attended Montgomery County, Maryland public schools, the Sidwell Friends School in Washington, and was graduated from Villanova University with a degree in English in 1973. He did graduate work at Oxford University under H.C.G. Matthew, editor of the diaries of William Gladstone, and earned a diploma in theological studies at Episcopal Theological Seminary in Virginia.

== Career ==
He worked as a reporter and editor at The Anniston Star in Alabama, Reuters and U.S. News & World Report. From 1974 to 1978, he was an assistant editor of The New Republic. He was associate editor of the Lexington Herald in Kentucky, assistant editor of the editorial pages of the Los Angeles Times, and was editor of the editorial pages at the Providence Journal from 1986 to 1992.

In 1970 he was a speechwriter for Lawrence O'Brien, then chairman of the Democratic National Committee. He later wrote speeches (1978–79) for U.S. Secretary of State Cyrus Vance.

For two decades before joining The Weekly Standard, Terzian wrote a column syndicated by the Scripps Howard News Service, and reported from dozens of foreign countries. He has been a Pulitzer Prize finalist for Distinguished Commentary, a Pulitzer Prize juror, and has been a media fellow at the Hoover Institution at Stanford University. He has been a contributor to the Wall Street Journal, The New Criterion, Harper's, The Spectator, the Times Literary Supplement, London Sunday Telegraph, Commentary, the Sewanee Review and other publications. A former member of the American Society of Newspaper Editors, he is a member of the American Council on Germany and the Association of Literary Scholars and Critics. He is married and the father of two children and, among his avocations, is honorary whip of the Wolver Beagles in Middleburg, Virginia.
