= Bullion (musician) =

British songwriter and record producer

- Born: Nathan Thomas Jenkins; London, England
- Genres: Electronic; experimental pop
- Occupations: Record producer; songwriter
- Website: nathanbullion.com

Nathan Jenkins, better known by his stage name Bullion, is a British songwriter and record producer.

== Career ==
Jenkins first attracted attention with his 2007 mashup album Pet Sounds: In the Key of Dee. After releasing singles on labels such as R&S, Honest Jon's, and Young Turks, he released You Drive Me to Plastic in 2011. Several of Jenkins's next releases came through his own record label, Deek Recordings, including Love Me Oh Please Love Me (2012), Loop the Loop (2016), and We Had a Good Time (2020). His album Affection was released on 26 April 2024 on Ghostly International. In June 2026, he released "Francis Ford" as the single for his album Nearly, which is scheduled to release on 25 September 2026.

== Discography ==
- Pet Sounds: In the Key of Dee (2007)
- You Drive Me to Plastic (2011)
- Love Me Oh Please Love Me (2012)
- Loop the Loop (2016)
- We Had a Good Time (2020)
- Affection (2024)
- Nearly (2026)
