= Owl City discography =

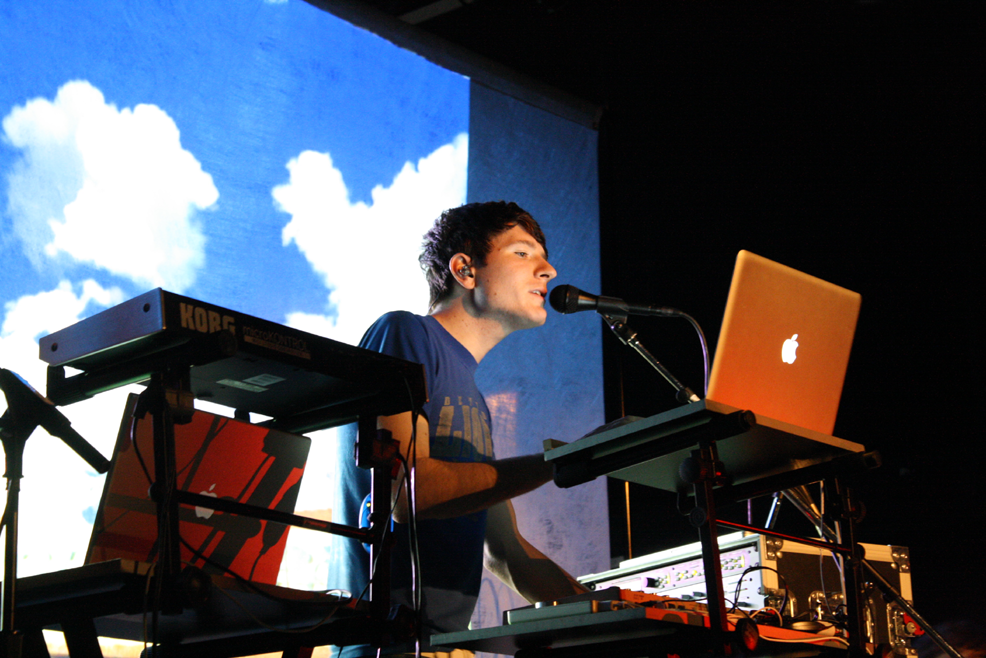
- Adam Young of Owl City, performing at the Bowery Ballroom in 2009
- Studio albums: 7
- Extended plays: 8
- Compilation albums: 1
- Singles: 26
- Music videos: 25
- Promotional singles: 12

The discography of American electronica project Owl City consists of seven studio albums, eight extended plays, twenty-six singles, and twenty-five music videos. Owl City issued his debut release, the extended play Of June, in September 2007; it peaked at number 15 on the United States Billboard Dance/Electronic Albums chart. His debut studio album Maybe I'm Dreaming followed in December 2008, peaking at number 13 on the Dance/Electronic Albums chart. Following the success of Of June and Maybe I'm Dreaming, Young signed to Universal Republic Records in late 2008. His second studio album and major-label debut, Ocean Eyes, was released in July 2009. "Fireflies", the album's lead single, became an international success, peaking at number one on the US Billboard Hot 100 and becoming a top ten hit in several other countries. In correlation with the success of "Fireflies", Ocean Eyes peaked at number eight on the US Billboard 200 and was later certified platinum by the Recording Industry Association of America (RIAA). An additional two singles were released from the album: "Vanilla Twilight" and "Umbrella Beach".

Owl City's third studio album All Things Bright and Beautiful was released in June 2011, peaking at number six on the Billboard 200 and selling 143,000 copies. The album produced four singles, with "Alligator Sky" and "Lonely Lullaby" managing to chart on the US Billboard Bubbling Under Hot 100 Singles chart. "Good Time", a collaboration with Canadian recording artist Carly Rae Jepsen, peaked at number eight on the Billboard Hot 100 and became a top ten chart hit in countries such as Australia, Canada, and the United Kingdom. Owl City released his fourth studio album The Midsummer Station in August 2012; it peaked at number seven on the Billboard 200. On July 10, 2015, Owl City released his fifth album, titled Mobile Orchestra, spawning the singles "Verge", "My Everything" and "Unbelievable". Owl City's sixth studio album, Cinematic, was released on June 1, 2018. His seventh studio album, Coco Moon, was released on March 24, 2023. On March 22, 2024, he released the deluxe edition of Coco Moon, which contains 6 extra songs, including a cover of Augustana's "Boston".

== Albums ==
=== Studio albums ===
List of studio albums, with selected chart positions, sales figures and certifications
Title	Album details	Peak chart positions										Sales	Certifications
Title	Album details	US	AUS	CAN	GER	JPN	KOR	NLD	NZ	SWI	UK	Sales	Certifications
Maybe I'm Dreaming	Released: March 17, 2008; Label: Sky Harbor; Formats: CD, DL	—	—	—	—	—	91	—	—	—	— (Note: Maybe I'm Dreaming did not enter the UK Albums Chart, but peaked at number 60 on the UK Album Downloads Chart.)		
Ocean Eyes	Released: July 14, 2009; Label: Universal Republic; Formats: CD, LP, DL	8	14	18	7	43	67	42	16	29	7	WW: 4,000,000; US: 1,100,000	RIAA: 2× Platinum; ARIA: Platinum; BPI: Gold; MC: Gold; RMNZ: Platinum
All Things Bright and Beautiful	Released: June 14, 2011; Label: Universal Republic; Formats: CD, LP, DL	6	33	7	69	31	49	100	—	40	52	US: 143,000	
The Midsummer Station	Released: August 21, 2012; Label: Universal Republic; Formats: CD, LP, DL	7	29	1	44	19	63	36	24	61	34	WW: 200,000; US: 92,775; CAN: 3,700; UK: 3,281	
Mobile Orchestra	Released: July 10, 2015; Label: Republic, Sky Harbor; Formats: CD, DL	11	33	5	—	40	59	83	—	—	98	US: 16,000; CAN: 2,000	
Cinematic	Released: June 1, 2018; Label: Sky Harbor; Formats: CD, DL, LP	115	— (Note: Cinematic did not enter the ARIA Top 100 Albums Chart, but peaked at number 25 on the ARIA Digital Album Chart.)	—	—	— (Note: Cinematic did not enter the Oricon Albums Chart, but peaked at number 46 on the Billboard Japan Hot Albums chart.)	—	—	— (Note: Cinematic did not enter the NZ Top 40 Albums Chart, but peaked at number five on the NZ Heatseeker Albums Chart.)	—	— (Note: Cinematic did not enter the UK Albums Chart, but peaked at number 34 on the UK Album Downloads Chart.)		
Coco Moon	Released: March 24, 2023; Label: Sky Harbor; Formats: CD, DL, LP	— (Note: Coco Moon did not enter the Billboard 200, but peaked at number 94 on the US Billboard Top Current Albums Sales component chart.)	—	—	—	—	—	—	—	—	— (Note: Coco Moon did not enter the UK Albums Chart, but peaked at number 43 on the UK Album Downloads Chart.)		
"—" denotes a recording that did not chart or was not released in that territory.

=== Compilation albums ===
List of compilation albums with selected chart positions, showing year released and album name
Title	Album details	Peak chart positions
Title	Album details	JPN
The Best of Owl City	Released: July 9, 2014; Label: Universal Music Japan; Formats: CD	118

=== Live albums ===
List of live albums, with selected chart positions
Title	Details	Peak chart positions	
Title	Details	US Video	UK Video
Owl City: Live from Los Angeles	Released: February 7, 2012; Label: Eagle Rock Entertainment; Formats: DVD	29	33

== Extended plays ==
List of extended plays, with selected chart positions and sales figures
Title	Details	Peak chart positions			Sales
Title	Details	US	US Dance	KOR	Sales
Of June	Released: September 8, 2007; Label: Sky Harbor; Formats: CD, digital download	—	15	38	
Shooting Star	Released: May 15, 2012; Label: Universal Republic; Formats: CD, digital download	49	—	—	
Spotify Sessions	Released: 2012; Label: Universal Republic; Formats: Streaming	—	—	—	
The Midsummer Station – Acoustic	Released: July 30, 2013; Label: Republic; Formats: Digital download	99	—	—	
Ultraviolet	Released: June 27, 2014; Label: Republic; Formats: CD, digital download	30	—	—	US: 9,000
Reel 1	Released: December 1, 2017; Label: Independent; Formats: Digital download	—	—	—	
Reel 2	Released: February 2, 2018; Label: Independent; Formats: Digital download	—	—	—	
Reel 3	Released: April 6, 2018; Label: Independent; Formats: Digital download	—	—	—	
"—" denotes a recording that did not chart or was not released in that territory.

== Singles ==
=== As lead artist ===
List of singles as lead artist, with selected chart positions, sales figures and certifications, showing year released and album name
Title	Year	Peak chart positions										Sales	Certifications	Album
Title	Year	US	AUS	BEL (Fl)	CAN	CZE	DEN	JPN	KOR	NZ	UK	Sales	Certifications	Album
"Fireflies"	2009	1	1	2	2	2	1	3	75	2	1	WW: 5,000,000; AUS: 37,354; CAN: 74,000; US: 5,212,895; UK: 844,895	RIAA: Diamond; ARIA: 6× Platinum; BEA: Gold; BPI: 2× Platinum; IFPI DEN: 2× Platinum; RMNZ: 4× Platinum	Ocean Eyes
"Vanilla Twilight"	2010	72	44	— (Note: "Vanilla Twilight" did not enter the Ultratop 50, but peaked at number 2 on the Ultratip chart.)	74	37	24	—	—	36	94		RIAA: Platinum	Ocean Eyes
"Umbrella Beach"	2010	—	—	—	—	—	—	—	—	—	110			Ocean Eyes
"To the Sky"	2010	— (Note: "To the Sky" did not enter the Billboard Hot 100, but peaked at number 25 on the Bubbling Under Hot 100 Singles chart.)	—	—	—	—	—	—	—	—	—			Legend of the Guardians: The Owls of Ga'Hoole
"Peppermint Winter"	2010	— (Note: "Peppermint Winter" did not enter the Billboard Hot 100, but peaked at number eight on the Bubbling Under Hot 100 Singles chart.)	—	— (Note: "Peppermint Winter" did not enter the Ultratop 50, but peaked at number 21 on the Ultratip chart.)	65	—	—	—	—	—	—			Non-album single
"Alligator Sky" (featuring Shawn Chrystopher)	2011	— (Note: "Alligator Sky" did not enter the Billboard Hot 100, but peaked at number five on the Bubbling Under Hot 100 Singles chart.)	—	— (Note: "Alligator Sky" did not enter the Ultratop 50, but peaked at number 16 on the Ultratip chart.)	—	—	— (Note: "Alligator Sky" did not enter the Danish Singles Chart, but peaked at number ten on the Danish Airplay chart.)	32	40	—	— (Note: "Alligator Sky" did not enter the UK Singles Chart, but peaked at number 49 on the UK Airplay chart.)			All Things Bright and Beautiful
"Galaxies"	2011	— (Note: "Galaxies" did not enter the Billboard Hot 100, but peaked at number 39 on the US Billboard Hot Christian Songs chart.)	—	—	—	—	—	— (Note: "Galaxies" did not enter the Japan Hot 100, but peaked at number 92 on the Japan Adult Contemporary Airplay chart.)	199	—	— (Note: "Galaxies" did not enter the UK Singles Chart, but peaked at number four on the UK Cross Rhythms chart.)			All Things Bright and Beautiful
"Lonely Lullaby"	2011	— (Note: "Lonely Lullaby" did not enter the Billboard Hot 100, but peaked at number 12 on the Bubbling Under Hot 100 Singles chart.)	—	—	—	—	—	—	136	—	—			All Things Bright and Beautiful
"Angels"	2011	— (Note: "Angels" did not enter the Billboard Hot 100, but peaked at number 43 on the US Billboard Dance/Electronic Digital Songs chart.)	—	—	—	—	—	—	—	—	— (Note: "Angels" did not enter the UK Singles Chart, but peaked at number six on the UK Cross Rhythms chart.)			All Things Bright and Beautiful
"Shooting Star"	2012	—	—	— (Note: "Shooting Star" did not enter the Ultratop 50, but peaked at number 10 on the Ultratip chart.)	— (Note: "Shooting Star" did not enter the Canadian Hot 100, but peaked at number two on the Canadian Singles Sales chart.)	—	—	49	21	—	176			The Midsummer Station
"Good Time" (Note: Also appears on Carly Rae Jepsen's album Kiss.) (with Carly Rae Jepsen)	2012	8	5	6	1	3	17	2	9	1	5	US: 2,249,000; UK: 200,000	RIAA: 2× Platinum; ARIA: 4× Platinum; BEA: Gold; BPI: Platinum; IFPI DEN: 2× Platinum; RIAJ: 2× Platinum; RMNZ: 3× Platinum	The Midsummer Station
"Beautiful Times" (featuring Lindsey Stirling)	2014	—	—	—	—	—	—	91	48	—	—			Ultraviolet
"Tokyo" (Note: Only appears on the Japanese edition of Mobile Orchestra.) (featuring Sekai no Owari)	2014	—	—	—	—	—	—	25	97	—	— (Note: "Tokyo" did not enter the UK Singles Chart, but peaked at number three on the UK Cross Rhythms chart.)			Mobile Orchestra
"Verge" (featuring Aloe Blacc)	2015	—	—	—	—	— (Note: "Verge" did not enter the Czech Radio Singles Top 100 chart, but peaked at number 71 on the Czech Singles Digital Top 100 chart.)	—	44	93	—	—			Mobile Orchestra
"My Everything"	2015	— (Note: "My Everything" did not enter the Billboard Hot 100, but peaked at number 22 on the US Billboard Hot Christian Songs chart.)	—	—	—	—	—	—	54	—	—			Mobile Orchestra
"Unbelievable" (featuring Hanson)	2015	— (Note: "Unbelievable" did not enter the Billboard Hot 100, but peaked at number 20 on the US Billboard Hot Christian Songs chart.)	—	—	—	—	—	—	47	—	—			Mobile Orchestra
"Not All Heroes Wear Capes"	2017	—	—	—	—	—	—	—	—	—	—			Cinematic
"All My Friends"	2017	—	—	—	—	—	—	—	—	—	— (Note: "All My Friends" did not enter the UK Singles Chart, but peaked at number ten on the UK Cross Rhythms chart.)			Cinematic
"Lucid Dream"	2018	— (Note: "Lucid Dream" did not enter the Billboard Hot 100, but peaked at number 19 on the US Billboard Christian Rock chart.)	—	—	—	—	—	—	—	—	— (Note: "Lucid Dream" did not enter the UK Singles Chart, but peaked at number three on the UK Cross Rhythms chart.)			Cinematic
"New York City"	2018	—	—	—	—	—	—	—	—	—	— (Note: "New York City" did not enter the UK Singles Chart, but peaked at number six on the UK Cross Rhythms chart.)			Cinematic
"Up to the Cloud"	2022	—	—	—	—	—	—	—	—	—	—			Non-album single
"Kelly Time"	2023	—	—	—	—	—	—	—	—	—	—			Coco Moon (Note: "Boston" and "Car Trouble" appear on the deluxe edition of Coco Moon.)
"Adam, Check Please"	2023	—	—	—	—	—	—	—	—	—	—			Coco Moon
"Vitamin Sea"	2023	—	—	—	—	—	—	—	—	—	—			Coco Moon
"Boston"	2024	—	—	—	—	—	—	—	—	—	—			Coco Moon
"Car Trouble"	2024	—	—	—	—	—	—	—	—	—	—			Coco Moon
"—" denotes a recording that did not chart or was not released in that territory.

=== As featured artist ===
List of singles as featured artist, with selected chart positions and certifications, showing year released and album name
Title	Year	Peak chart positions							Certifications	Album
Title	Year	US Christ	BEL (FL)	CIS	MEX Ing.	NLD	UK Dance	UKR	Certifications	Album
"Middledistancerunner" (Chicane featuring Adam Young)	2010	—	—	—	—	—	26	—		Giants
"Youtopia" (Armin van Buuren featuring Adam Young)	2011	—	137	107	—	68	—	36		Mirage
"All About Us" (He Is We featuring Owl City)	2011	—	—	—	—	—	—	—	RIAA: Gold	Non-album single
"Eternity" (Paul Van Dyk featuring Adam Young)	2012	—	—	175	39	—	—	—		Evolution
"Cactus in the Valley" (Lights featuring Owl City)	2013	—	—	—	—	—	— (Note: "Cactus in the Valley" did not enter the UK Dance Chart, but peaked at number nine on the UK Cross Rhythms chart.)	—		Siberia Acoustic
"That's My Jam" (Relient K featuring Owl City)	2013	— (Note: "That's My Jam" did not enter the US Billboard Hot Christian Songs chart, but peaked at number eight on the Christian Digital Song Sales chart.)	—	—	—	—	—	—		Collapsible Lung
"Ready to Fly" (Didrick featuring Adam Young)	2018	—	—	—	—	—	—	—		Non-album singles
"Let the Light In" (Joshua Micah featuring Owl City)	2022	— (Note: "Let the Light In" did not enter the US Billboard Hot Christian Songs chart, but peaked at number 48 on the US Christian Airplay chart.)	—	—	—	—	—	—		Non-album singles
"Forever & Always" (Armin van Buuren and Gareth Emery featuring Owl City)	2022	—	—	—	—	—	—	—		Feel Again, Pt. 2
"—" denotes a recording that did not chart or was not released in that territory.

=== Promotional singles ===
List of promotional singles, with selected chart positions and certifications, showing year released and album name
Title	Year	Peak chart positions						Sales	Certifications	Album
Title	Year	US	US Christ	US Christ Rock	US Dance /Elec	KOR	UK	Sales	Certifications	Album
"The Christmas Song"	2008	—	—	—	—	—	—			Non-album single
"Hot Air Balloon"	2009	—	—	—	—	41	—	US: 12,400		Ocean Eyes
"Strawberry Avalanche"	2009	—	—	—	—	—	—	US: 9,000		Ocean Eyes
"Sunburn"	2009	—	—	—	—	—	—			Ocean Eyes
"Hello Seattle"	2009	— (Note: "Hello Seattle" did not enter the Billboard Hot 100, but peaked at number six on the Bubbling Under Hot 100 Singles chart.)	—	—	—	200	—		RIAA: Gold	Ocean Eyes
"Deer in the Headlights"	2011	—	—	—	—	145	—			All Things Bright and Beautiful
"Dreams Don't Turn to Dust"	2011	—	—	—	— (Note: "Dreams Don't Turn to Dust" did not enter the Billboard Hot Dance/Electronic Songs chart, but peaked at number 26 on the Dance/Electronic Digital Songs component chart.)	—	—			All Things Bright and Beautiful
"I'm Coming After You"	2012	—	—	—	—	—	— (Note: "I'm Coming After You" did not enter the UK Singles Chart, but peaked at number four on the UK Cross Rhythms chart.)			The Midsummer Station
"Metropolis"	2012	—	—	—	—	—	—			The Midsummer Station
"Wolf Bite"	2014	—	—	22	— (Note: "Wolf Bite" did not enter the Billboard Hot Dance/Electronic Songs chart, but peaked at number 48 on the Dance/Electronic Digital Songs component chart.)	—	—			Ultraviolet
"You're Not Alone" (featuring Britt Nicole)	2014	—	5	—	—	— (Note: "You're Not Alone" did not enter the South Korea International Singles chart, but peaked at number 78 on the South Korea BGM chart.)	— (Note: "You're Not Alone" did not enter the UK Singles Chart, but peaked at number ten on the UK Cross Rhythms chart.)			Mobile Orchestra
"Kiss Me Babe, It's Christmas Time"	2014	—	—	—	—	—	— (Note: "Kiss Me Babe, It's Christmas Time" did not enter the UK Singles Chart, but peaked at number two on the UK Cross Rhythms chart.)			Non-album single
"—" denotes a recording that did not chart or was not released in that territory.

== Other charted songs ==
List of songs, with selected chart positions and certifications, showing year released and album name
Title	Year	Peak chart positions								Certifications	Album
Title	Year	US	US Christ	US Christ Rock	US Dance /Elec	CAN	JPN	KOR	UK	Certifications	Album
"The Technicolor Phase"	2008	—	—	—	—	—	—	99	—		Maybe I'm Dreaming
"Tidal Wave"	2009	—	—	28	—	—	—	—	—		Ocean Eyes
"The Real World"	2011	— (Note: "The Real World" did not enter the Billboard Hot 100, but peaked at number nine on the Bubbling Under Hot 100 Singles chart.)	—	—	— (Note: "The Real World" did not enter the Billboard Hot Dance/Electronic Songs chart, but peaked at number six on the Dance/Electronic Digital Songs component chart.)	—	—	—	—		All Things Bright and Beautiful
"Kamikaze"	2011	—	—	—	—	—	—	—	— (Note: "Kamikaze" did not enter the UK Singles Chart, but peaked at number seven on the UK Cross Rhythms chart.)		All Things Bright and Beautiful
"Honey and the Bee" (featuring Breanne Düren)	2011	—	—	—	—	—	—	—	— (Note: "Honey and the Bee" did not enter the UK Singles Chart, but peaked at number two on the UK Cross Rhythms chart.)		All Things Bright and Beautiful
"The First Noel" (TobyMac featuring Owl City)	2011	—	30	—	—	—	—	—	—		Christmas in Diverse City
"Gold"	2012	—	—	—	—	—	—	138	—		The Midsummer Station
"Take It All Away"	2012	—	—	—	—	—	—	163	—		The Midsummer Station
"Dementia" (featuring Mark Hoppus)	2012	—	—	—	—	—	—	171	—		The Midsummer Station
"Dreams and Disasters"	2012	—	43	29	—	—	—	156	—		The Midsummer Station
"Speed of Love"	2012	—	—	—	—	—	—	—	— (Note: "Speed of Love" did not enter the UK Singles Chart, but peaked at number five on the UK Cross Rhythms chart.)		The Midsummer Station
"When Can I See You Again?"	2012	— (Note: "When Can I See You Again?" did not enter the Billboard Hot 100, but peaked at number 11 on the Bubbling Under Hot 100 Singles chart.)	—	—	—	78	100	—	—	RIAA: Platinum; BPI: Silver	Wreck-It Ralph soundtrack
"Shine Your Way"	2013	—	—	—	—	—	—	93	—		The Croods soundtrack
"Hey Anna"	2013	—	—	—	—	—	—	22	—		The Midsummer Station - Acoustic
"Light of Christmas" (featuring TobyMac)	2013	—	2	17	—	—	—	—	—		VeggieTales: Merry Larry and the True Light of Christmas
"Up All Night"	2014	—	—	—	—	—	—	91	—		Ultraviolet
"Listen to What the Man Said"	2014	—	—	—	—	—	—	—	— (Note: "Listen to What the Man Said" did not enter the UK Singles Chart, but peaked at number one on the UK Cross Rhythms chart.)		The Art of McCartney
"Mobile Orchestra"	2015	—	—	—	—	—	67	—	—		Mobile Orchestra
"Thunderstruck"	2015	—	—	—	—	—	—	—	— (Note: "Thunderstruck" did not enter the UK Singles Chart, but peaked at number two on the UK Cross Rhythms chart.)		Mobile Orchestra
"This Isn't the End"	2015	—	—	—	—	—	—	—	— (Note: "This Isn't the End" did not enter the UK Singles Chart, but peaked at number six on the UK Cross Rhythms chart.)		Mobile Orchestra
"Can't Live Without You"	2015	—	—	—	—	—	—	—	— (Note: "Can't Live Without You" did not enter the UK Singles Chart, but peaked at number three on the UK Cross Rhythms chart.)		Mobile Orchestra
"Cloud Nine"	2018	—	—	—	—	—	—	—	— (Note: "Cloud Nine" did not enter the UK Singles Chart, but peaked at number seven on the UK Cross Rhythms chart.)		Cinematic
"House Wren"	2018	—	—	—	—	—	—	—	— (Note: "House Wren" did not enter the UK Singles Chart, but peaked at number six on the UK Cross Rhythms chart.)		Cinematic
"—" denotes a recording that did not chart or was not released in that territory.

== Guest appearances ==
List of guest appearances, with other performing artists, showing year released and album name
Title	Year	Other artist(s)	Album
"Enchanted"	2011	Taylor Swift (Original Version)	—N/a
"The First Noel"	2011	TobyMac	Christmas in Diverse City
"Blinding Light – Adam Young of Owl City Remix"	2012	Switchfoot	Vice Re-Verses
"Alive"	2012	Schiller	Sonne
"When Can I See You Again?"	2012	—N/a	Wreck-It Ralph soundtrack
"Shine Your Way"	2013	Yuna	The Croods soundtrack
"Live It Up"	2013	—N/a	The Smurfs 2 soundtrack
"Light of Christmas"	2013	TobyMac	VeggieTales: Merry Larry and the Light of Christmas
"In the Air"	2013	Ørjan Nilsen	No Saint Out of Me
"That's My Jam"	2013	Relient K	Collapsible Lung
"Listen to What the Man Said"	2014	—N/a	The Art of McCartney
"Snow Snow Snow"	2015	Band of Merrymakers	Welcome to Our Christmas Party
"Waving Through a Window"	2017	—N/a	—N/a
"Clap Your Hands"	2017	—N/a	Featured in Everybody's Golf (video game)
"All Star" (Owl City Remix)	2022	Smash Mouth	—N/a
"Let the Light In"	2022	Joshua Micah	—N/a
"Gone"	2023	Switchfoot	The Beautiful Letdown (Our Version)

== Music videos ==
=== As lead artist ===
Title	Year	Director(s)
"Early Birdie"	2008	Andy Johnson
"Fireflies"	2009	Steve Hoover
"Vanilla Twilight"	2010	Steve Hoover
"Umbrella Beach"	2010	Alexander Brown
"To the Sky" (from The Original Motion Picture Legend of the Guardians: The Owls of Ga'Hoole)	2010	Danny Yourd
"Alligator Sky" (featuring Shawn Chrystopher)	2011	Steve Hoover
"Deer in the Headlights"	2011	Steve Hoover
"Good Time" (with Carly Rae Jepsen)	2012	Declan Whitebloom
"Shooting Star"	2012	Ethan Lader
"When Can I See You Again?" (from Wreck-It Ralph Soundtrack)	2012	Matt Stawski
"Shine Your Way" (from The Croods) (with Yuna)	2013	—
"Metropolis"	2013	Daniel Cummings
"Beautiful Times" (featuring Lindsey Stirling)	2014	Everdream
"Wolf Bite" (Official Visualiser)	2014	Everdream
"Up All Night" (Official Visualiser)	2014	Everdream
"This Isn't the End" (Official Visualiser)	2014	Everdream
"Tokyo" (featuring Sekai no Owari) (Official Visualiser Video)	2014	Masahiro Tsuruoka
"Verge"	2015	Matt Stawski
"My Everything"	2015	Eric Ulbrich, Kylie Eaton
"Unbelievable" (featuring Hanson)	2015	Ryan Maloney
"Not All Heroes Wear Capes (Acoustic)"	2017	Max Haben
"All My Friends"	2017	Max Haben
"Lucid Dream"	2018	Max Haben
"New York City"	2018	Max Haben
"Vitamin Sea"	2023	Rudy Kovasckitz
