= List of songs recorded by Owl City =

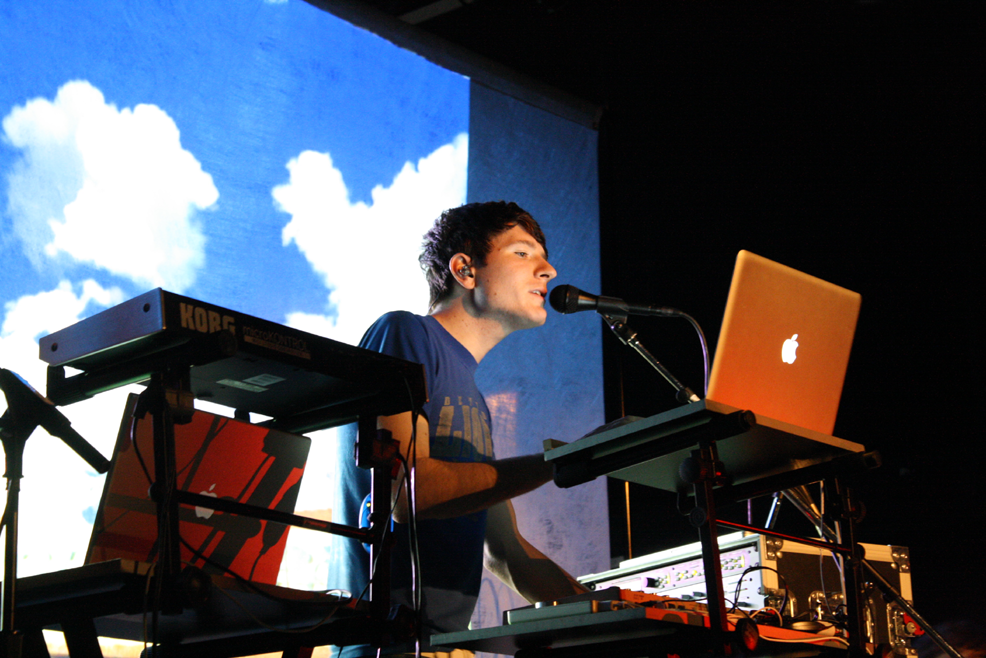
Owl City in 2009.

Owl City is an American electronica project created in 2007 in Owatonna, Minnesota; it is one of the several projects by singer, songwriter and multi-instrumentalist Adam Young. Young created the project while experimenting with music in his parents' basement. Owl City developed a following on the social networking site MySpace, like many musicians who achieved success in the late 2000s, before signing with Universal Republic Records, now Republic Records, in 2008.

Owl City issued its debut release, the extended play Of June, in September 2007; it peaked at number 15 on the United States Billboard Dance/Electronic Albums chart. His debut studio album Maybe I'm Dreaming followed in December 2008, peaking at number 13 on the Dance/Electronic Albums chart. Following the success of Of June and Maybe I'm Dreaming, Young signed to Universal Republic Records in late 2008. His second studio album and major-label debut, Ocean Eyes, was released in July 2009. "Fireflies", the album's lead single, became an international success, peaking at number one on the US Billboard Hot 100 and becoming a top ten hit in several other countries. Fueled by success of "Fireflies", Ocean Eyes peaked at number eight on the US Billboard 200 and was later certified two times platinum by the Recording Industry Association of America (RIAA). An additional three singles were released from the album: "Vanilla Twilight", "Hello Seattle" and "Umbrella Beach".

Owl City's third studio album All Things Bright and Beautiful was released in June 2011, peaking at number six on the Billboard 200 and selling 143,000 copies. The album produced six singles, with "Alligator Sky" and "Lonely Lullaby" managing to chart on the US Billboard Bubbling Under Hot 100 Singles chart. "Good Time", a collaboration with Canadian recording artist Carly Rae Jepsen, peaked at number eight on the Billboard Hot 100 and became a top ten chart hit in countries such as Australia, Canada and the United Kingdom. Owl City released his fourth studio album The Midsummer Station in August 2012; it peaked at number seven on the Billboard 200. On July 10, 2015, Owl City released his fifth album, titled Mobile Orchestra, spawning the singles "You're Not Alone", "Verge" and "Unbelievable".

== Released songs ==
Key
†	Indicates single release
‡	Indicates song included on an alternative version of the album
•	Indicates song written solely by Young

Title	Artist(s)	Writer(s)	Album	Year	Ref
"Adam, Check Please" †	Owl City	Adam Young •	Coco Moon	2023	
"Air Traffic"	Owl City	Adam Young •	Maybe I'm Dreaming	2008	
"The Airway"	Owl City	Adam Young •	Of June	2007	
"Alive"	Schiller featuring Adam Young	Adam Young •	Sonne	2012	
"All About Us" †	He Is We featuring Owl City	Trevor Kelly; Rachel Taylor	Non-album single	2011	
"All My Friends" †	Owl City	Adam Young; Matthew Thiessen; Emily Wright	Cinematic	2017	
"Alligator Sky" †	Owl City featuring Shawn Chrystopher	Adam Young; Shawn Chrystopher; Bobby Ray Simmons Jr. Antwan André Patton	All Things Bright and Beautiful	2011	
"Always"	Owl City	Adam Young •	Cinematic	2018	
"Back Home"	Owl City featuring Jake Owen	Adam Young; Matthew Thiessen; Emily Wright	Mobile Orchestra	2015	
"Be Brave"	Owl City	Adam Young •	Cinematic	2018	
"Beautiful Times" †	Owl City featuring Lindsey Stirling	Adam Young •	Ultraviolet	2014	
"The Bird and the Worm"	Owl City	Adam Young; Matthew Thiessen	Ocean Eyes	2009	
"Bird With a Broken Wing"	Owl City	Adam Young •	Mobile Orchestra	2015	
"Bombshell Blonde"	Owl City	Adam Young; Matthew Thiessen	The Midsummer Station ‡	2012	
"Boston" †	Owl City	Dan Layus	Coco Moon	2024	
"Butterfly Wings"	Owl City	Adam Young •	Ocean Eyes ‡	2009	
"Cactus in the Valley" †	Lights featuring Owl City	Lights Poxleitner	Siberia Acoustic	2013	
"Can't Live Without You"	Owl City	Adam Young •	Mobile Orchestra	2015	
"Captains and Cruise Ships"	Owl City	Adam Young •	Of June	2007	
"Car Trouble" †	Owl City	Adam Young •	Coco Moon	2024	
"Cave In"	Owl City	Adam Young •	Ocean Eyes	2009	
"Cinematic"	Owl City	Adam Young •	Cinematic	2018	
"Cloud Nine"	Owl City	Adam Young •	Cinematic	2018	
"Dear Vienna"	Owl City	Adam Young •	Maybe I'm Dreaming	2008	
"Deer in the Headlights"	Owl City	Adam Young •	All Things Bright and Beautiful	2011	
"Dementia"	Owl City featuring Mark Hoppus	Adam Young •	Shooting Star	2012	
"Dementia"	Owl City featuring Mark Hoppus	Adam Young •	The Midsummer Station	2012	
"Dental Care"	Owl City	Adam Young •	Ocean Eyes	2009	
"Designer Skyline"	Owl City	Adam Young •	Of June	2007	
"Dinosaur Park"	Owl City	Adam Young •	Coco Moon	2023	
"Dreams and Disasters"	Owl City	Adam Young; Emily Wright; Nate Campany	The Midsummer Station	2012	
"Dreams Don't Turn to Dust"	Owl City	Adam Young •	All Things Bright and Beautiful	2011	
"Early Birdie"	Owl City	Adam Young •	Maybe I'm Dreaming	2008	
"Embers"	Owl City	Adam Young; Emily Wright; Nate Campany	The Midsummer Station	2012	
"Eternity" †	Paul van Dyk featuring Adam Young	Paul van Dyk; Adam Young	Evolution	2012	
"Field Notes"	Owl City	Adam Young •	Coco Moon	2023	
"Fiji Water"	Owl City	Adam Young •	Cinematic	2017	
"Firebird"	Owl City	Adam Young •	Cinematic	2018	
"Fireflies" †	Owl City	Adam Young •	Ocean Eyes	2009	
"The First Noel"	TobyMac featuring Owl City	Traditional	Christmas in Diverse City	2011	
"Forever & Always" †	Armin van Buuren and Gareth Emery featuring Owl City	Armin van Buuren; Gareth Emery; Adam Young; Benno de Goeij; Anthony Galatis	Non-album single	2022	
"Fuzzy Blue Lights"	Owl City	Adam Young •	Of June	2007	
"Galaxies" †	Owl City	Adam Young •	All Things Bright and Beautiful	2011	
"Gold"	Owl City	Josh Crosby; Emily Wright; Nate Campany	Shooting Star	2012	
"Gold"	Owl City	Josh Crosby; Emily Wright; Nate Campany	The Midsummer Station	2012	
"Good Time" †	Owl City and Carly Rae Jepsen	Adam Young; Matthew Thiessen; Brian Lee	The Midsummer Station	2012	
"Hello Seattle"	Owl City	Adam Young •	Of June	2007	
"Hello Seattle"	Owl City	Adam Young •	Ocean Eyes	2009	
"Hey Anna"	Owl City	Adam Young	The Midsummer Station - Acoustic	2013	
"Honey and the Bee"	Owl City featuring Breanne Düren	Adam Young •	All Things Bright and Beautiful	2011	
"Hospital Flowers"	Owl City	Adam Young •	All Things Bright and Beautiful	2011	
"Hot Air Balloon"	Owl City	Adam Young •	Ocean Eyes ‡	2009	
"House Wren"	Owl City	Adam Young •	Cinematic	2018	
"How I Became the Sea"	Owl City	Adam Young •	All Things Bright and Beautiful ‡	2011	
"Humbug"	Owl City	Adam Young •	Non-album single	2016	
"I Found Love"	Owl City	Adam Young •	Mobile Orchestra	2015	
"I Hope You Think of Me"	Owl City	—N/a	The Midsummer Station - Acoustic	2013	
"I'll Meet You There"	Owl City	Adam Young •	Maybe I'm Dreaming	2008	
"I'm Coming After You"	Owl City	Adam Young; Matthew Thiessen; Brian Lee	The Midsummer Station	2012	
"If My Heart Was a House"	Owl City	Adam Young •	Ocean Eyes ‡	2009	
"In the Air"	Ørjan Nilsen featuring Adam Young	—N/a	No Saint Out of Me	2013	
"January 28, 1986"	Owl City	Adam Young •	All Things Bright and Beautiful	2011	
"Kamikaze"	Owl City	Adam Young •	All Things Bright and Beautiful	2011	
"Kelly Time" †	Owl City	Adam Young •	Coco Moon	2023	
"Kiss Me Babe, It's Christmas Time"	Owl City	Adam Young •	Non-album single	2014	
"Learn How to Surf"	Owl City	Adam Young •	Coco Moon	2023	
"Let The Light In" †	Joshua Micah featuring Owl City	—	Non-album single	2022	
"Light of Christmas"	Owl City featuring TobyMac	Adam Young; Matthew Thiessen; Toby McKeehan	VeggieTales: Merry Larry and the True Light of Christmas	2013	
"Listen to What the Man Said"	Owl City	Paul McCartney; Linda McCartney	The Art of McCartney	2014	
"Live It Up"	Owl City	Adam Young; Matthew Thiessen; Emily Wright	The Smurfs 2 - Original Motion Picture Soundtrack	2013	
"Lonely Lullaby" †	Owl City	Adam Young •	All Things Bright and Beautiful ‡	2011	
"Lucid Dream" †	Owl City	Adam Young •	Cinematic	2018	
"Madeline Island"	Owl City	Adam Young •	Cinematic	2018	
"The Meadow Lark"	Owl City	Adam Young •	Coco Moon	2023	
"Meteor Shower"	Owl City	Adam Young •	Ocean Eyes	2009	
"Metropolis"	Owl City	Adam Young; Matthew Thiessen	The Midsummer Station	2012	
"Mobile Orchestra"	Owl City	Adam Young •	Mobile Orchestra ‡	2015	
"Montana"	Owl City	Adam Young •	Cinematic	2018	
"My Everything" †	Owl City	Adam Young •	Mobile Orchestra	2015	
"My Muse"	Owl City	Adam Young •	Coco Moon	2023	
"New York City" †	Owl City	Adam Young •	Cinematic	2018	
"Not All Heroes Wear Capes" †	Owl City	Adam Young •	Cinematic	2017	
"On the Wing"	Owl City	Adam Young •	Maybe I'm Dreaming	2008	
"On the Wing"	Owl City	Adam Young •	Ocean Eyes	2009	
"Panda Bear"	Owl City	Adam Young •	Of June	2007	
"Peppermint Winter" †	Owl City	Adam Young •	Non-album single	2010	
"Plant Life"	Owl City	Adam Young; Matthew Thiessen	All Things Bright and Beautiful	2011	
"Rainbow Veins"	Owl City	Adam Young •	Maybe I'm Dreaming	2008	
"The Real World"	Owl City	Adam Young •	All Things Bright and Beautiful	2011	
"Rugs From Me to You"	Owl City	Adam Young •	Ocean Eyes ‡	2009	
"The Saltwater Room"	Owl City featuring Breanne Düren	Adam Young •	Maybe I'm Dreaming	2008	
"The Saltwater Room"	Owl City featuring Breanne Düren	Adam Young •	Ocean Eyes	2009	
"Shine Your Way"	Owl City and Yuna	Alan Silvestri; Glen Ballard; Kirk DeMicco; Chris Sanders	The Croods - Original Motion Picture Soundtrack	2013	
"Shooting Star" †	Owl City	Adam Young; Mikkel S. Eriksen; Tor Erik Hermansen; Matthew Thiessen; Dan Omelio	Shooting Star	2012	
"Shooting Star" †	Owl City	Adam Young; Mikkel S. Eriksen; Tor Erik Hermansen; Matthew Thiessen; Dan Omelio	The Midsummer Station	2012	
"Shy Violet"	Owl City	Adam Young •	All Things Bright and Beautiful ‡	2011	
"Silhouette"	Owl City	Adam Young •	The Midsummer Station	2012	
"Sky Diver"	Owl City	Adam Young •	Maybe I'm Dreaming	2008	
"Sons of Thunder"	Owl City	Adam Young •	Coco Moon	2023	
"Speed of Love"	Owl City	Adam Young; Matthew Thiessen; Sam Hollander	The Midsummer Station	2012	
"Strawberry Avalanche"	Owl City	Adam Young •	Ocean Eyes ‡	2009	
"Sunburn"	Owl City	Adam Young •	Ocean Eyes ‡	2009	
"Super Honeymoon"	Owl City	Adam Young •	Maybe I'm Dreaming	2008	
"Swimming in Miami"	Owl City	Adam Young •	Of June	2007	
"Take It All Away"	Owl City	Adam Young; Emily Wright; Nate Campany; Allan P. Grigg	Shooting Star	2012	
"Take It All Away"	Owl City	Adam Young; Emily Wright; Nate Campany; Allan P. Grigg	The Midsummer Station	2012	
"That's My Jam"	Relient K featuring Owl City	Matt Thiessen; Matt Hoopes; Brian Lee; Sam Hollander	Collapsible Lung	2013	
"The Technicolor Phase"	Owl City	Adam Young •	Maybe I'm Dreaming	2008	
"This is the Future"	Owl City	Adam Young •	Maybe I'm Dreaming	2008	
"This Isn't the End"	Owl City	Adam Young •	Ultraviolet	2014	
"This Isn't the End"	Owl City	Adam Young •	Mobile Orchestra	2015	
"Thunderstruck"	Owl City featuring Sarah Russell	Adam Young •	Mobile Orchestra	2015	
"The Tip of the Iceberg"	Owl City	Adam Young •	Ocean Eyes	2009	
"Tidal Wave"	Owl City	Adam Young; Matthew Thiessen	Ocean Eyes	2009	
"To the Sky" †	Owl City	Adam Young •	Legend of the Guardians: The Owls of Ga'Hoole - Original Motion Picture Soundtrack	2010	
"Tokyo" †	Owl City featuring Sekai no Owari	Adam Young •	Mobile Orchestra ‡	2014	
"Top of the World"	Owl City	Adam Young •	The Midsummer Station ‡	2012	
"The Tornado"	Owl City	Adam Young •	Coco Moon	2023	
"Umbrella Beach" †	Owl City	Adam Young •	Ocean Eyes	2009	
"Unbelievable" †	Owl City featuring Hanson	Adam Young; Isaac Hanson; Matthew Thiessen; Emily Wright	Mobile Orchestra	2015	
"Under the Circus Lights"	Owl City	Adam Young •	Coco Moon	2023	
"Up All Night"	Owl City	Adam Young •	Ultraviolet	2014	
"Up All Night"	Owl City	Adam Young •	Mobile Orchestra ‡	2015	
"Up to the Cloud" †	Neural Cloud x Owl City	Adam Young •	Non-album single	2022	
"Vanilla Twilight" †	Owl City	Adam Young •	Ocean Eyes	2009	
"Verge" †	Owl City featuring Aloe Blacc	Adam Young; Aloe Blacc; Matthew Thiessen; Emily Wright	Mobile Orchestra	2015	
"Vitamin Sea" †	Owl City	Adam Young •	Coco Moon	2023	
"Waving Through a Window"	Owl City	Pasek and Paul	Dear Evan Hansen - Original Motion Picture Soundtrack	2017	
"West Coast Friendship"	Owl City	Adam Young •	Maybe I'm Dreaming	2008	
"When Can I See You Again?"	Owl City	Adam Young; Matthew Thiessen; Brian Lee	Wreck-It Ralph - Original Motion Picture Soundtrack	2012	
"Winners Never Quit"	Owl City	Adam Young •	Cinematic	2018	
"Wolf Bite"	Owl City	Adam Young •	Ultraviolet	2014	
"The Yacht Club"	Owl City featuring Lights	Adam Young •	All Things Bright and Beautiful	2011	
"You're Not Alone"	Owl City featuring Britt Nicole	Adam Young •	Mobile Orchestra	2015	
"Youtopia" †	Armin van Buuren featuring Adam Young	Armin van Buuren; Marinus de Goeij; Adam Young	Mirage	2010	
"The 5th of July"	Owl City	Adam Young •	Cinematic	2017	
