= All Things Bright and Beautiful Tour =

2011 concert tour by Owl City

- Tour by Owl City
- Promotional poster for the October 26, 2011, concert
- Associated album: All Things Bright and Beautiful
- Start date: June 13, 2011
- End date: November 20, 2011
- Legs: 5
- No. of shows: 76

Owl City concert chronology
- Ocean Eyes World Tour (2010); All Things Bright and Beautiful Tour (2011); The Midsummer Station World Tour (2012)

The All Things Bright and Beautiful Tour is the second headlining concert tour by American electronica project Owl City, in support of his third studio album, All Things Bright and Beautiful (2011).

== Background ==
Owl City released his third studio album, All Things Bright and Beautiful on June 14, 2011. In March 2011, Owl City announced the All Things Bright and Beautiful World Tour. Tickets went on sale for the North American leg of the tour in late March and early April. Tickets went on sale in New Zealand and Australia, the UK and Europe and Asia in May 2011. The North American leg of the tour began in June to July 2011 with supporting acts from Unwed Sailor and Mat Kearney. The first leg of the tour hit 29 cities in North America, including two festival appearances.

The second leg of the tour took place in New Zealand and Australia in August 2011 with New Empire joining as the opening act. Owl City toured across Europe from September to October 2011 in the third leg of the tour. The leg featured opening acts from Unicorn Kid, Long Lost Sun and Owl City's touring keyboardist, Breanne Düren. A fourth leg commenced in Asia in October 2011. Düren also opened for Owl City during the leg of the tour. Owl City returned to the United States for the fifth and final leg of the tour from October to November 2011, with support from Days Difference.

== Reception ==
=== Critical response ===
The All Things Bright and Beautiful Tour was met with positive feedback from critics. Scott Fryberger of Jesus Freak Hideout gave a positive review with the show at Uptown Theater. He wrote, "Owl City always puts on a good show. A lot of people pass on his music just due to the poppy nature, and assume that a live show would be just a bunch of recorded loops while he sings with an autotuner... Young always has a full band with him, and they always arrange the songs in unique ways, so they don't always sound exactly like they do on the album." Fryberger praised the live band for their "creative and artistic set," as well as calling Mat Kearney and Unwed Sailor a good fit as an opener for Owl City. For the concert at the Mann, Jamie Ellis of Philly Burbs also gave a positive feedback. He stated, "Although both artists played songs that sounded extremely similar to one another, they proved to be incredibly talented musicians. With fantastic stage presence and charisma, Mat Kearney and Owl City both impressed the audience." A mixed response came from Chris Riemenschneider of The Star Tribune reviewing the Roy Wilkins Auditorium concert. He praised live band members Laura Musten and Hannah Schroeder on their performance on "Cave In" and "Meteor Shower", and Breanne Düren on "Honey and the Bee". However, he felt that the setlist lacked "versatility" noting, "After playing a majority of the tracks off his two major-label albums, it became clear that too many of Young's songs follow the same airy, heartbeat-rhythmic sonic formula and song structures." Despite describing the performance for "I'll Meet You There" and "Kamikaze" as "low points," he appreciated the change-up for adding piano ballad "Lonely Lullaby" and a "heavy, Bon Jovi-like fist-pumper intro" rearrangement for "Fireflies".

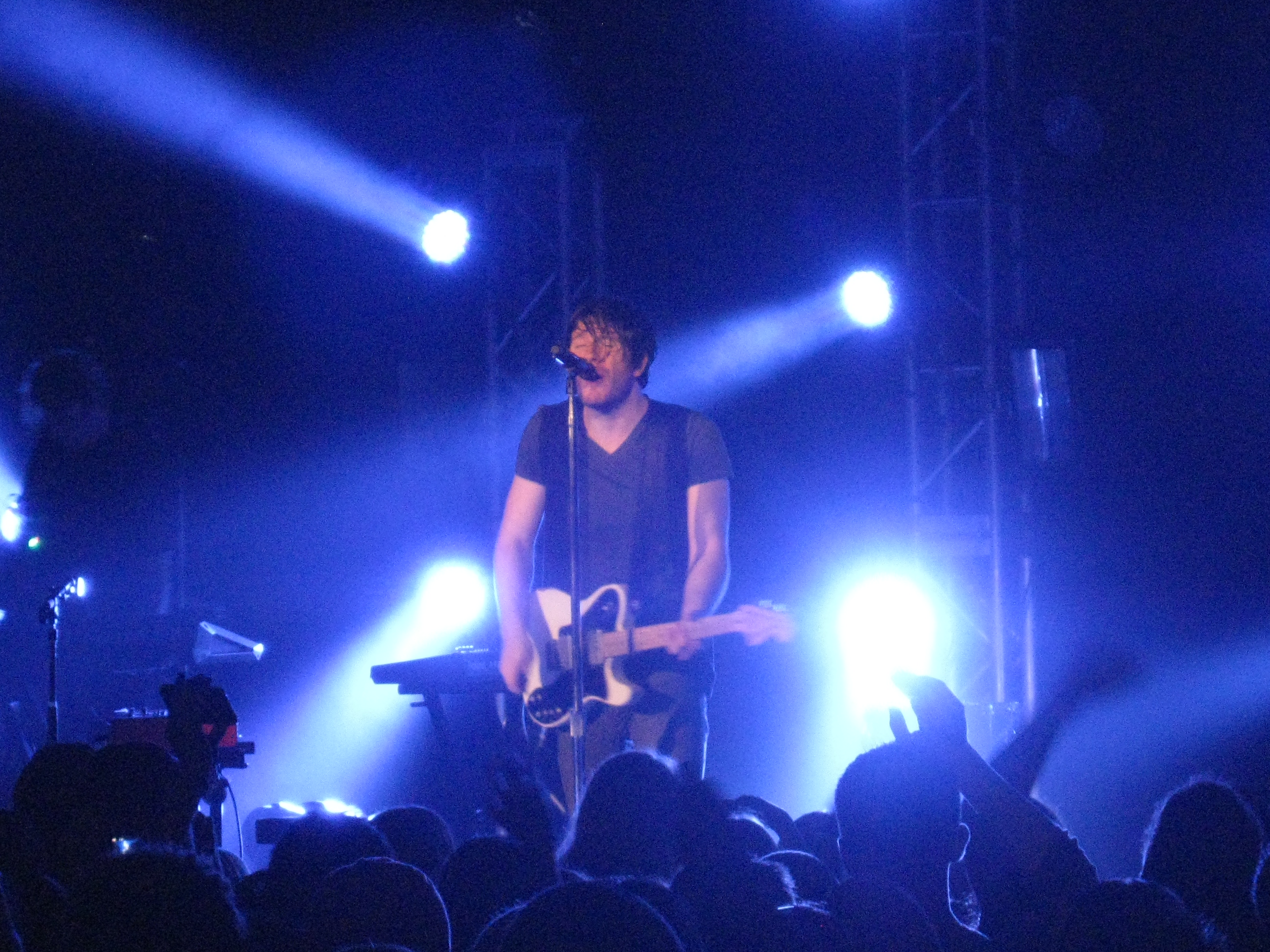
Owl City performing at the 9:30 Club in Washington, D.C., in November 2011

Matthew Kivel of Variety wrote on the Club Nokia concert noting, "Owl City's hyper-digitized brand of emotional rock music seemed perfectly suited for the setting, but the show's high production values and complex lighting schemes came off as a bit overblown in the limited environs." He complimented Owl City's live drummer Casey Brown for his ability on "matching the nuanced electronic beats with a forceful, highly syncopated full drum treatment." The Denver Post gave a positive review for the Fillmore Auditorium concert writing, "Young and his seasoned backing band gave the notably youthful fan base a heavy dose of production value and virtuosity. Flanked by an electric forest of synthesizers, drum machines, swarming lights, and an excitable string duo, the band zipped through an ambitious set list of old and new 'faith-tronica.'" Ian Gelling of Brum Live! gave a mixed review with the show at O_{2} Birmingham Academy. He felt that "the set lacked variation" and that "it was hard to tell if the crowd were embraced or just really bored." He also added that the crowd didn't interact up until "Fireflies" was performed during the set. However, he praised Young's optimism that made up for the concert.

== Recording ==
A recording of the All Things Bright and Beautiful Tour was filmed during Owl City's July 21, 2011 show at Club Nokia in Los Angeles, United States. The DVD includes footage of live performances of the concert, behind the scenes footage and exclusive interviews. Young stated that it was his manager who came up with the idea to film the concert. The DVD peaked at number 29 on the US Top Music Videos Chart. It also reached number 33 on the UK Music Video Charts.

== Opening acts ==
- Unwed Sailor (North America)
- Mat Kearney (North America)
- Days Difference (North America)
- New Empire (Oceania)
- Unicorn Kid (Europe)
- Long Lost Sun (Europe)
- Breanne Düren (Europe and Asia)

== Setlist ==
This set list is representative of the performance on July 21, 2011, at Club Nokia in Los Angeles, United States. It does not represent the set list at all concerts for the duration of the tour.

1. "The Real World"
2. "Cave In"
3. "Hello Seattle"
4. "Angels"
5. "Swimming in Miami"
6. "Umbrella Beach"
7. "I'll Meet You There"
8. "Plant Life"
9. "Setting Sail"
10. "The Bird and the Worm"
11. "Lonely Lullaby"
12. "Fireflies"
13. "Dreams Don't Turn to Dust"
14. "Kamikaze"
15. "Meteor Shower"
16. "Galaxies"
17. "Alligator Sky"
18. "Deer in the Headlights"
19. "The Yacht Club"
20. "How I Became the Sea"
21. "If My Heart Was a House"

== Tour dates ==
Date	City	Country	Venue
North America
June 13, 2011	Nashville	United States	Ryman Auditorium
June 14, 2011	Atlanta	United States	The Tabernacle
June 16, 2011	Orlando	United States	House of Blues
June 17, 2011	Charlotte	United States	The Fillmore
June 18, 2011	Baltimore	United States	Pier Six
June 20, 2011	Montreal	Canada	Olympia
June 21, 2011	Toronto	Canada	Kool Haus
June 23, 2011	New York City	United States	Roseland Ballroom
June 25, 2011	Philadelphia	United States	The Mann
June 26, 2011	Boston	United States	House of Blues
June 28, 2011	Indianapolis	United States	Egyptian Room
June 29, 2011	Detroit	United States	The Fillmore
June 30, 2011	Milwaukee	United States	Summerfest
July 1, 2011	Columbus	United States	Lifestyle Communities Pavilion
July 2, 2011 (Note: This concert is a part of the Creation Festival performance.)	Mount Union	United States	Creation Festival
July 11, 2011	Kansas City	United States	Uptown Theater
July 12, 2011	Denver	United States	Fillmore Auditorium
July 13, 2011	Salt Lake City	United States	McKay Event Center
July 15, 2011	Seattle	United States	Paramount Theatre
July 16, 2011	Vancouver	Canada	The Centre
July 17, 2011	Portland	United States	Roseland Ballroom
July 19, 2011	San Francisco	United States	Warfield Theatre
July 21, 2011	Los Angeles	United States	Club Nokia
July 23, 2011	Pomona	United States	Pomona Fox Theater
July 25, 2011	Houston	United States	Verizon Wireless Theater
July 26, 2011	Grand Prairie	United States	Verizon Theatre at Grand Prairie
July 27, 2011	Austin	United States	ACL Live
July 29, 2011	Chicago	United States	Aragon Ballroom
July 30, 2011	Saint Paul	United States	Roy Wilkins Auditorium
Oceania
August 12, 2011	Auckland	New Zealand	Auckland Town Hall
August 15, 2011	Brisbane	Australia	The Tivoli
August 16, 2011	Sydney	Australia	The Metro Theatre
August 17, 2011	Melbourne	Australia	Billboard
August 18, 2011	Melbourne	Australia	Billboard
Europe
September 5, 2011	Dublin	Ireland	The Academy
September 7, 2011	Glasgow	Scotland	O_{2} ABC
September 8, 2011	Manchester	England	Academy
September 10, 2011	London	England	O_{2} Shepherd's Bush Empire
September 12, 2011	Leeds	England	O_{2} Academy Leeds
September 13, 2011	Birmingham	England	O_{2} Birmingham Academy
September 15, 2011	Tilburg	Netherlands	013
September 16, 2011	Brussels	Belgium	Ancienne Belgique
September 17, 2011	Paris	France	Bataclan
September 19, 2011	Madrid	Spain	Ramdall
September 20, 2011	Lisbon	Portugal	Campo Pequeno bullring
September 22, 2011	Barcelona	Spain	Apolo 2
September 24, 2011	Milan	Italy	Magazzini Generali
September 26, 2011	Zürich	Switzerland	Abart
September 27, 2011	Munich	Germany	Theaterfabrik
September 29, 2011	Vienna	Austria	Vienna Arena
September 30, 2011	Berlin	Germany	Postbahnhof
October 1, 2011	Cologne	Germany	Gloria Theatre
October 2, 2011	Hamburg	Germany	Gruenspan
October 4, 2011	Copenhagen	Denmark	Vega
October 5, 2011	Stockholm	Sweden	Debaser Medis
Asia
October 20, 2011	Osaka	Japan	Big Cat
October 21, 2011	Nagoya	Japan	Club Quattro
October 22, 2011	Tokyo	Japan	Shinagawa Prince Stellar Ball
October 24, 2011	Seoul	South Korea	Melon AX Hall
October 26, 2011	Manila	Philippines	NBC Tent
October 28, 2011	Jakarta	Indonesia	Tennis Indoor Senayan
United States
October 31, 2011	Honolulu	United States	Hawaii Theatre
November 2, 2011	Flagstaff	United States	Northern Arizona University
November 4, 2011	Oklahoma City	United States	Diamond Ballroom
November 5, 2011	Omaha	United States	Sokol Auditorium
November 7, 2011	St. Louis	United States	The Pageant
November 9, 2011	Louisville	United States	Expo Five
November 11, 2011	Cedarville	United States	Dixon Ministry Center
November 12, 2011	Allentown	United States	Crocodile Rock
November 13, 2011	Sayreville	United States	Starland Ballroom
November 14, 2011	Norfolk	United States	The NorVa
November 16, 2011	Washington, D.C.	United States	9:30 Club
November 17, 2011	Cleveland	United States	House of Blues
November 18, 2011	Grand Rapids	United States	The Intersection
November 19, 2011	Minneapolis	United States	University of Minnesota Fieldhouse
November 20, 2011	Waukesha	United States	Carroll University

== Postponed shows ==
List of postponed concerts, showing date, city and venue
Date	City	Venue	Ref.
November 6, 2011	Waukesha	Carroll University	
