= Owl City: Live from Los Angeles =

2012 video album by Owl City

Owl City: Live From Los Angeles

Video by Owl City
- Released: February 7, 2012
- Recorded: July 21, 2011, at Club Nokia in Los Angeles, United States
- Length: 94 minutes
- Label: Eagle Rock Entertainment
- Director: Mark Lucas
- Producer: John Rubey; Michael A. Blum

Owl City: Live From Los Angeles is a video album documenting the July 21, 2011, show of American electronica project Owl City's All Things Bright and Beautiful World Tour. It was released on February 7, 2012, by Eagle Rock Entertainment. Filmed at the Club Nokia in Los Angeles, the 94-minute recording was directed by Mark Lucas and produced by John Rubey and Michael A. Blum.

== Development and release ==
The 94-minute recording was directed by Mark Lucas, and was produced by John Rubey and Michael A. Blum. During the concert, Daniel Jorgensen performed guitar and synth, Breanne Düren performed keyboards, synth and sang backing vocals, Laura Musten performed violin, Hannah Schroeder performed cello and bass guitar and Casey Brown performed drums. Speaking about the DVD with Billboard, Young stated;

"The video actually was kind of a spur of the moment thing. My manager said to me that the live show had come so far from where I initially began, which of course was just me and a laptop — the most boring show in the world! It came into it's [sic] own and became a cinematic sort of experience. So he said, 'Why don't we get a film crew and capture it. It would be kind of a shame to have this great show put together and not have anything to remember it by after the tour was over.' So we did it, and it really worked out great. I'm really glad we have the show preserved."

Owl City: Live From Los Angeles includes footage of live performances of the concert, behind the scenes footage and exclusive interviews. The DVD was available for pre-order on November 29, 2011. The video album was released digitally on iTunes on December 6, 2011, in North America before it was released worldwide on DVD and Blu-ray on February 7, 2012.

== Reception ==
Professional ratings
Review scores
Source	Rating
Jesus Freak Hideout	4.5/5 stars

Live From Los Angeles was met with mixed to positive reviews. Scott Fryberger of Jesus Freak Hideout gave a positive review calling the concert a "stellar live show." He also praised Owl City's touring musicians for their versatility and was impressed by their drummer Casey Brown. He ended off remarking, "All in all, this is a terrific DVD." George Lang of The Oklahoman gave a mixed review. He praised the song "Fireflies" for its "visceral arrangement" and "Galaxies" as the apex point of the DVD. However, he was critical of the visual execution of the DVD stating, "the camerawork is nearly devoid of style, providing little more than a front-row seat balanced with audience views."

== Track listing ==
All tracks are written by Adam Young, except where noted.

No.	Title	Writer(s)	Length
1.	"The Real World"		6:50
2.	"Cave In"		5:43
3.	"Hello Seattle"		3:47
4.	"Angels"		4:24
5.	"Swimming in Miami"		3:30
6.	"Umbrella Beach"		4:18
7.	"I'll Meet You There"		5:51
8.	"Plant Life"	Adam Young, Matthew Thiessen	4:15
9.	"Setting Sail"		4:10
10.	"The Bird and the Worm"		3:56
11.	"Lonely Lullaby"		7:07
12.	"Fireflies"		4:49
13.	"Dreams Don't Turn to Dust"		3:35
14.	"Kamikaze"		3:52
15.	"Meteor Shower"		2:10
16.	"Galaxies"		4:01
17.	"Alligator Sky"	Adam Young, Shawn Chrystopher	3:14
18.	"Deer in the Headlights"		3:38
19.	"The Yacht Club"		4:35
20.	"How I Became the Sea"		4:53
21.	"If My Heart Was a House"		6:00
22.	"Bonus Interview"

== Credits ==
Credits for Owl City: Live From Los Angeles adapted from the DVD.

Owl City

- Adam Young – lead vocals, piano, synth, guitar, drums, percussion

Additional musicians

- Daniel Jorgensen – synth, guitar, vibraphone, drums, percussion, bass
- Breanne Düren – keyboards, synth, backing vocals
- Laura Musten – violin, synth
- Hannah Schroeder – cello, synth, bass
- Casey Brown – drums, synth, percussion, bass

Production

- Jeff Ravitz – lighting designer
- George Bellias – video editor
- Adam Young – DVD audio mixing, stage design
- Rich Renken – DVD audio mastering
- Danny Graham, Mark Haney – tech manager
- Chris Mitchell, Zach Greenberg – technical director
- Santiago Yniguez, Jason Livingston, Chris Rhodes, Keith Denton, Darien Pasika, Pablo Bryant – camera operator
- Dave Rosenblum – production assistant
- Ryan Chin – creative director
- Dan Bagnall – digital manager
- Adam Jackson – production manage, front of house sound engineer, stage design
- Andy Frost – backline coordinator, playback engineer
- Micah Davis – monitor engineer
- Derek Kern – guitar technician, backline technician
- Paul Holst – lighting designer, lighting director, stage design, lighting programming
- Scot Sepe – bandit lites technician
- Brian Jenkins – lighting programming
- Brent Barrett, Matt King – lighting

== Charts ==
Chart performance for Owl City: Live From Los Angeles
Chart (2012)	Peak position
UK Music Video Charts (OCC)	33
US Top Music Videos Chart (Billboard)	29

== Release history ==
Region	Date	Format	Label	Ref.
North America	December 6, 2011	Digital download	Eagle Rock Entertainment	
Various	February 7, 2012	DVD; Blu-ray	Eagle Rock Entertainment	
