= Angels (Owl City song) =

Single by Owl City

from the album All Things Bright and Beautiful
- Released: September 20, 2011
- Studio: Sky Harbor Studios
- Genre: Christian rock
- Length: 3:40
- Label: Universal Republic
- Songwriter: Adam Young
- Producer: Young

Owl City singles chronology
"Lonely Lullaby" (2011)	"Angels" (2011)	"Youtopia" (2011)

"Angels" is a song by American electronica act Owl City. It was released on September 20, 2011, for Christian radio airplay as the fourth and final single from his third studio album, All Things Bright and Beautiful.

== Background ==
Young wrote the song under the belief that angels do exist, as he explained in an interview with Songfacts. In another interview with NJ.com, Young stated, "I think ultimately, it lies within a conscious choice — waking up every morning with an uplifting outlook. There's so much beauty out there. Sometimes the trick is just to open your eyes."

== Composition and lyrics ==
"Angels" was written and produced by Adam Young. The track runs at 120 BPM and is in the key of C-sharp minor. Young's range in the song spans from the notes B3 – C♯6. The song refers to Young's faith to God. The song mentions references about "the beauty of our surroundings" and that there are angels all around us, saying, "So if you're dying to see, I guarantee there are angels around your vicinity." The song also makes reference to space with the lyrics going, "Among my frivolous thoughts, I believe there are beautiful things seen by the astronauts."

The song features a lot of guitar, where Young explained his decision to adding it was because he wanted "to hit it really hard" so that "there's lots of dynamics" to it.

== Live performances ==
"Angels" was performed live regularly during the All Things Bright and Beautiful Tour and was featured in Owl City's live album Owl City: Live From Los Angeles.

== Chart performance ==
"Angels" peaked at number 43 on the US Dance/Electronic Digital Song Sales chart. The song also debuted at number six of the UK Cross Rhythms Weekly Chart and stayed on the chart for two weeks.

== Charts ==
Chart performance for "Angels"
Chart (2011)	Peak position
UK Christian Songs (Cross Rhythms)	6
US Dance/Electronic Digital Song Sales (Billboard)	43

== Release history ==
Release history for "Angels"
Region	Date	Format	Label	Ref.
United States	September 20, 2011	Christian radio	Universal	
