= Owl City =

American electronica musical project

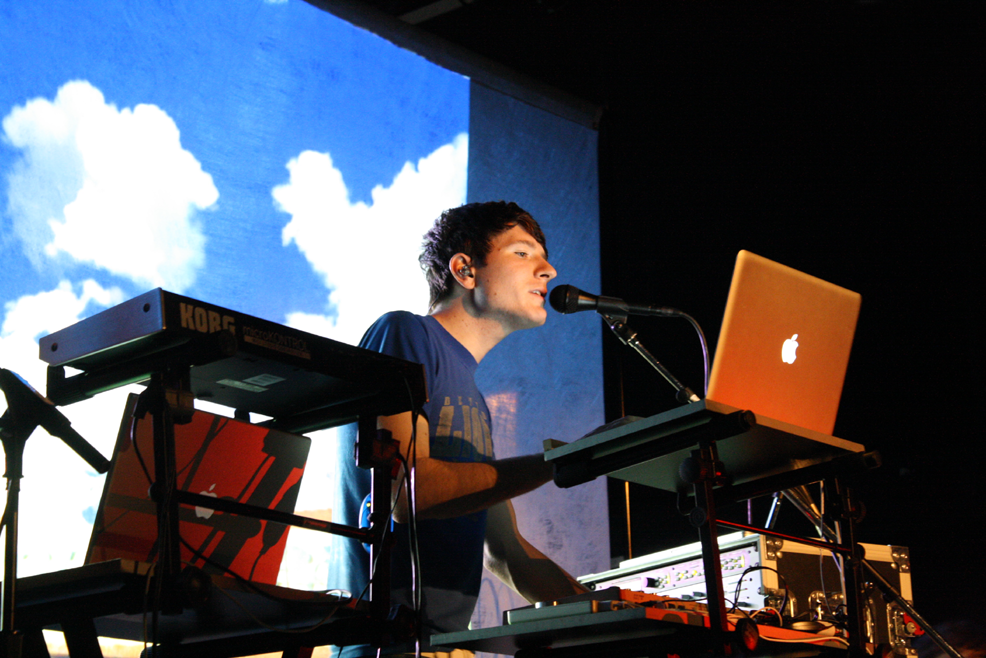
- Owl City performing at the Bowery Ballroom in 2009

Background information
- Origin: Owatonna, Minnesota, U.S.
- Genres: Electronica; dream pop; synth-pop; indietronica; pop; CEDM; CCM
- Works: Discography; songs; tours
- Years active: 2007–present
- Labels: Republic; Sky Harbor
- Members: Adam Young
- Website: owlcitymusic.com

Owl City is an American electronic music project created in 2007 in Owatonna, Minnesota. It is one of several projects by singer, songwriter and multi-instrumentalist Adam Young, who created the project while experimenting with music in his parents' basement. Owl City developed a following on the social networking site Myspace, like many musicians who achieved success in the late 2000s, before signing with Universal Republic Records, now Republic Records, in 2008.

After two independent releases, his debut EP Of June (2007) and debut studio album Maybe I'm Dreaming (2008), Owl City gained mainstream popularity with its 2009 major-label debut and second studio album, Ocean Eyes, which includes the Diamond certified & Billboard Hot 100 number-one single "Fireflies". The album was certified 2× Platinum in the United States, with "Fireflies" being certified Diamond in January 2023.

In June 2011, Owl City released its third studio album, All Things Bright and Beautiful, which was followed by The Midsummer Station in August 2012. It released its fifth studio album and last under Republic Records, Mobile Orchestra in July 2015. It released its sixth and seventh studio album Cinematic (2018) and Coco Moon (2023), independently.

Owl City has recorded songs for several animated films, including Legend of the Guardians: The Owls of Ga'Hoole, Wreck-It Ralph, The Croods and The Smurfs 2. Owl City also has released several charting singles, most notably the Carly Rae Jepsen duet "Good Time" and "Fireflies".

== History ==
=== 2007–2009: early years, Of June, and Maybe I'm Dreaming ===
Adam Young has attributed the name Owl City to a number of sources. His official blog says it derives from the short film An Occurrence at Owl Creek Bridge (1962), due to his identification with the protagonist. In other interviews, he has referred to his sister's pet owl, as well as to an owl that met its demise on the windshield of his father's truck. He has also described seeing a large number of owls in a forest in Scotland while visiting his grandmother.

Suffering from insomnia while working loading Coca-Cola trucks, Young began to compose music, recording with a C-1 Behringer Microphone. Among the software that he began with was Reason from Propellerhead. He began uploading songs recorded in his parents' basement to MySpace. "Hello Seattle" was the first track written for Owl City, which also inspired the project. After receiving favorable attention for his music, he began receiving emails from major record labels in the spring of 2008. His manager Steve Bursky later highlighted the significance of Young's engaging online manner in building his following saying: "People feel like they know him, like they've got a direct connection to him because of how he approaches his connection with them online." Through a deal with the digital aggregator CD Baby, he then started making the songs available for sale through iTunes. In 2007, Owl City released an EP titled Of June, followed by the release of his debut studio album Maybe I'm Dreaming on March 17, 2008. Of June reached No. 15 on the Billboard Dance/Electronic Albums chart, and Maybe I'm Dreaming peaked on the same chart at No. 13. The song "The Technicolor Phase", from his debut album, was featured in the soundtrack of Tim Burton's Alice in Wonderland.

In February 2009, Owl City signed with Universal Republic. He played his first show to a sold-out crowd at the Varsity Theater in Minnesota. He continued to perform shows from May to June 2009. In May, Owl City performed at the 2009 Bamboozle festival.

=== 2009–2010: Ocean Eyes ===
Ocean Eyes, Owl City's major label debut and second studio album, was released on iTunes on July 14, 2009, with the physical release following on July 28. The album peaked at number eight on the Billboard 200 and topped the Billboard Dance/Electronic Albums chart for four weeks. The album sold 20,000 copies in its first week, before selling 1.1 million copies as of July 2012. By April 2010, it was certified Platinum in the United States. It was certified 2× Platinum by the Recording Industry Association of America in January 2023. The album was mostly recorded in his parents' basement, before Young got his own place and finished it up there.

Owl City released his debut single, "Fireflies" on July 14, 2009. The song became a commercial success, topping the Billboard Hot 100 in the United States for the week ending November 7, 2009. The song spent two non-consecutive weeks at number one on the Billboard Hot 100, returning to top spot for the week ending November 21, 2009. It was the ninth best-selling songs of 2009 in the United States. The song was certified Diamond by the RIAA. Internationally, the song also topped the charts in Ireland, Australia, Denmark and the Netherlands. "Fireflies" was featured as iTunes' "Single of the Week" and garnered 650,000 downloads. A music video for the song premiered in 2009 and was directed by Steve Hoover. "Fireflies" also peaked at the top of the charts in the United Kingdom, becoming Britain's 20th most downloaded song of all time.

"Vanilla Twilight" was released on January 26, 2010, as the second single from the album. The song debuted at No. 95 on the Billboard Hot 100, the same week "Fireflies" reached No. 1. The song eventually peaked at No. 72 on the chart. It was certified Platinum by the RIAA. The music video for "Vanilla Twilight" was released on March 22, 2010, and features a cameo appearance from Shaquille O'Neal. The album's third and final single, "Umbrella Beach" was released on May 17, 2010, and peaked at No. 110 on the UK Singles Chart.

Young was joined by Breanne Düren on several tracks; the most notable example of which is "The Saltwater Room". The track "Sunburn", is featured on Soundtrack 90210, which was released on October 13, 2009. The song "Hello Seattle" found commercial success peaking at number 12 on the Bubbling Under Hot 100 chart and was certified Gold by the RIAA. During the summer of 2009, Owl City embarked on his first headlining tour and opened for Relient K. In the fall, Owl City embarked on a second headlining tour that began in October to November 2009, with support from The Scene Aesthetic and Brooke Waggoner. He continued to tour in early 2010, in support of the album. He was joined by Lights and Deas Vail. Owl City joined Cobra Starship as an opening act on their Australian and New Zealand tour in March 2010.

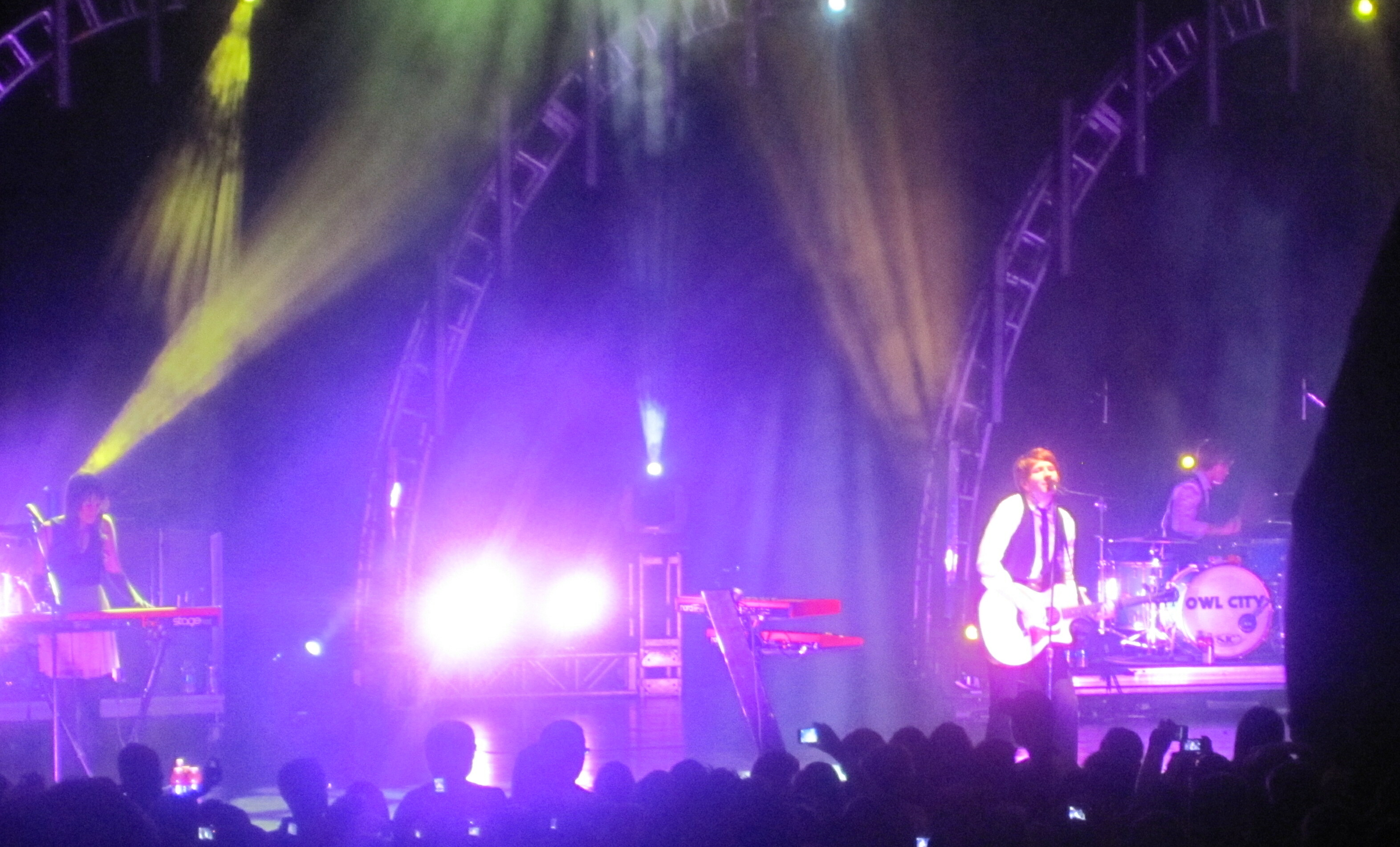
Owl City performing in April 2010

In 2010, Young revealed a new musical project known as Sky Sailing, which moved away from his usual electronica genre of music and introduced acoustic guitar and piano accompaniments into his work. The unrefined tracks were recorded in the summer of 2007, before he began making music as Owl City. His first album under this new project is entitled An Airplane Carried Me to Bed, and was released on July 13, 2010, via iTunes.

Young collaborated with English electronic musician Chicane and released the single "Middledistancerunner" on July 30, 2010, featuring Young on vocals. He also worked with Dutch producer Armin van Buuren, appearing on a track called "Youtopia" from the van Buuren album Mirage. In August 2010, "To the Sky" was officially released on the soundtrack for Legend of the Guardians: The Owls of Ga'hoole. That same month, he opened for John Mayer and Maroon 5. On October 25, 2010, Young released a cover version of Keith Getty & Stuart Townend's modern hymn "In Christ Alone" for streaming on his website.

Taylor Swift's song "Enchanted", released on October 25, 2010, was rumored to be about the time she met Adam Young. Young recorded his cover of "Enchanted" as a response, altering the lyrics to address Swift directly. He posted the recording on his website on February 13, 2011. He released a Christmas single called "Peppermint Winter" in November 2010.

=== 2010–2011: All Things Bright and Beautiful ===
Production on Young's third studio album began around mid-2010, after he returned home from his Ocean Eyes World Tour, with Young being announced as the executive producer of the album. Young also worked with engineer and producer Jack Joseph Puig on the album. On October 18, Young wrote an entry on his blog regarding his third studio album, saying that the album was nearing completion. This time around, Young opted to use less auto-tune and processed vocals for the album and wanted it to sound more "finished" than his previous album. A lot of the record was influenced by his experiences visiting places like Japan, Australia and New Zealand, while on tour.

In February 2011, the title of the album was announced to be All Things Bright and Beautiful and that the album would be released on May 24, before the release date was later bumped up to May 17. However, on April 6, Young released a statement on his website, along with lengthy previews of four of his songs ("Dreams Don't Turn to Dust", "Alligator Sky Featuring Shawn Chrystopher", "Galaxies", and "Deer in the Headlights"), that the release date for All Things Bright and Beautiful would be pushed back to June 14. The album's title is based on the hymn of the same name. In March 2011, Owl City announced the All Things Bright and Beautiful World Tour. In addition to the tour announcement, an app titled Owl City Galaxy was launched, where fans could pre-order the album and access content such as an exclusive bonus track not included in the album, early access to concert tickets and merch. The album debuted at number six on the Billboard 200 with first week sales of 48,000 copies.

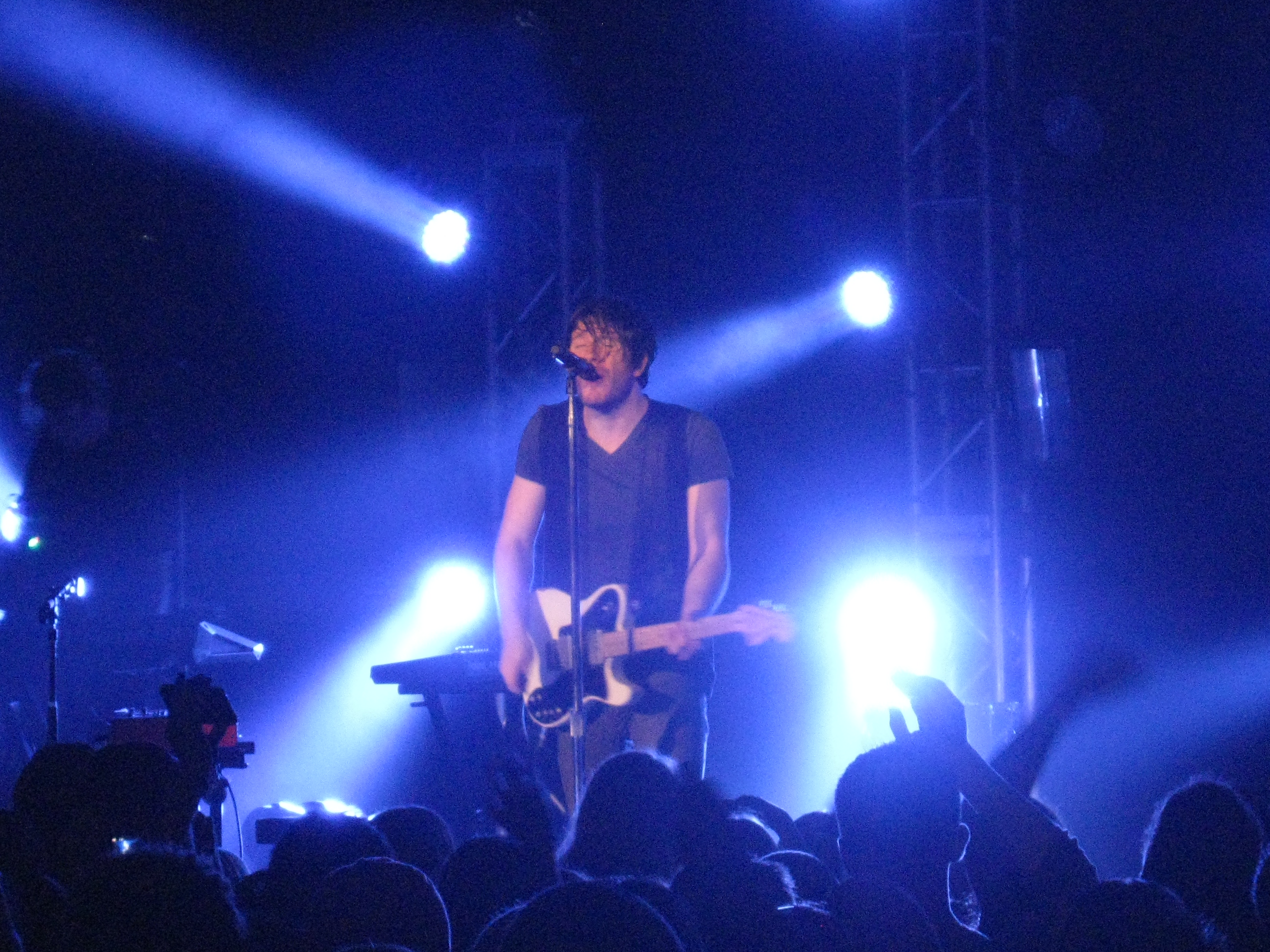
Owl City performing at the 9:30 Club in Washington, D.C., in November 2011

"Alligator Sky" was released as the lead single from the album on March 22, 2011, featuring rapper Shawn Chrystopher. The music video for the song premiered on May 6. Young discussed the concept in a making-of video posted on Owl City's VEVO account, "The concept is basically about these two guys who are leaving Earth. Rather than it being this very dark post-apocalyptic vibe, it's very optimistic, and so it's like people are excited to leave earth." The song peaked at number five on the Bubbling Under Hot 100 chart. The song, "Galaxies" was released as the second single from the album on April 19, 2011. Young stated that the song is about the Space Shuttle Challenger disaster. It reached number 39 on the US Hot Christian Songs chart.

"Deer in the Headlights" was released on iTunes on May 23, 2011, as the first promotional single from the album. The music video for the track was released on June 30, 2011, and showcases Young driving through the night in a replica of the DMC DeLorean featured from the Back to the Future trilogy. Canadian musician Lights also makes a cameo appearance during the video. "Lonely Lullaby" was released as the album's third single on July 19, 2011. Though it was not featured on the standard edition of All Things Bright and Beautiful, it was included as a bonus track for the album. The song is dedicated to his ex-girlfriend Annmarie Monson, who he described as the "most wonderful, beautiful woman" he knew. The song was previously available only to Owl City Galaxy members in March 2011. "Angels" was released for Christian radio airplay on September 20, 2011. "Dreams Don't Turn to Dust" was released as a single exclusively in the UK on October 10, 2011.

During the month of July at the Club Nokia concert in Los Angeles, Young announced that the concert was being filmed for a Live DVD. The recording entitled, Owl City: Live From Los Angeles, was eventually released on iTunes in December 2011. In August 2011, Owl City was featured on the song "All About Us" by He Is We. On November 15, 2011, Jumeirah released a commercial for their famous Burj Al Arab luxury hotel which Young was called upon to compose the music for the commercial.

=== 2012–2013: The Midsummer Station ===
On January 2, 2012, Young wrote an entry on his blog regarding his fourth full-length album. Young said that he would be collaborating with more producers and songwriters, saying that his new record "Marks a flying leap in this direction". In an interview with Billboard, Young revealed that the new album is around 80–85% complete, and that Dr. Luke, JR Rotem, Norwegian production team Stargate, Brian Kennedy and Emily Wright are involved with the production of the album. Young expected the album to be released around the summer of 2012. Speaking about his decision on adding outside collaboration, Young wanted "to experiment with other people."

Young, along with Jewel and Jay Sean, released a song in promotion of the Child Hunger Ends Here campaign by ConAgra Foods entitled "Here's Hope". He also released a set of covers, "Home of the Blues" by Johnny Cash and "Garden Party" by Rick Nelson. On April 17, 2012, "Dementia", a song by Young which was included on his upcoming album surfaced onto the internet and features additional vocals by Mark Hoppus of Blink-182. The song later premiered via Alternative Press on May 10.

Young released a new EP, Shooting Star, on May 15 and features four songs off his upcoming album, so that fans a could get clear taste of what the album would sound like. The EP spawned the single, "Shooting Star" which peaked at number 36 on the US Hot Christian Songs chart. Soon after, Young announced that Owl City's fourth studio album would be titled The Midsummer Station. The album was originally planned to have a release date of August 14, 2012, however, was pushed back to August 17, while the UK release date would be brought to August 20. He toured in July and August, to promote the upcoming album and was joined by Jayme Dee as support. The album peaked at number seven on the Billboard 200, selling 30,000 copies in its first week. Additionally, the album peaked at number one on the Canadian Albums Chart with first week sales of 3,700 copies.

On June 20, 2012, he premiered the song, "Good Time", a collaboration with Carly Rae Jepsen, via his SoundCloud account. The song was officially released as a single on June 26, 2012. It received generally positive reviews from critics, including Billboard: "It only makes sense that he's joined by Jepsen...[on] a track that could become a radio staple for the rest of the summer," and Entertainment Weekly: "'Good Time' goes down easier than a frozen margarita at a beachfront tiki bar." It was written by Matt Thiessen, Brian Lee and Young himself. The song peaked at No. 8 on the Billboard Hot 100, becoming his second top 10 in United States. Additionally, the song reached No. 1 in Canada and New Zealand. The song was certified 2× Platinum by the RIAA. An EP titled, Good Time (Remixes) was released, featuring many remixes, including one from Young himself. On August 18, a preview of "I Hope You Think of Me" was released on Young's blog which was later included on his The Midsummer Station - Acoustic EP. The following day, Young released two demo songs: "Beautiful Mystery" and "Paper Tigers". In the fall of 2012, Owl City embarked on the Midsummer Station World Tour in support of the album.

On October 5, the song "When Can I See You Again?", from the Disney film Wreck-It Ralph, was released. The song was certified Platinum by the RIAA. Later that month, Universal announced that subsidiary Universal Republic Records would be closed down, with the label's entire roster being transferred to Republic Records; as a result, all future Owl City material would be released on Republic Records. In December 2012, Adam Young released a cover of the Art Garfunkel song "Bright Eyes" from the film Watership Down; he had previously cited Watership Down as one of his favorite books. He also performed at the 2012 Jingle Ball in his home state.

Owl City began working on his next studio album in late 2012 that was expected to be released the following year. Young stated that his new music would contain more EDM songs and claimed that his new album would be "edgy". He also hoped to record a song for the album with Ellie Goulding. Instead of a full-length album, Owl City released The Midsummer Station - Acoustic on July 30. The EP contained acoustic versions of the songs "Good Time", "Shooting Star", and "Gold", taken from his fourth studio album. It also contained two previously unreleased tracks: "Hey Anna" and "I Hope You Think of Me".

In the meantime, Young continued to tour and worked on multiple songs for animated films and television commercials. He joined Maroon 5 and Neon Trees on a US arena tour from February to April 2013. On March 4, the song "Shine Your Way", featuring Young and Yuna, was released from the soundtrack to The Croods. On March 15, Young was featured on "Cactus in the Valley", a song by Lights. Owl City performed a 90-second jingle for Oreo's "Wonderfilled" commercial in May 2013. "Live It Up" was released on The Smurfs 2: Music from and Inspired By Soundtrack. In the summer, Owl City toured in Asia, in support of The Midsummer Station. Owl City released the single "Light of Christmas", which featured tobyMac, on October 22. The song was created for the 2013 VeggieTales Christmas movie Merry Larry and the True Light of Christmas.

=== 2014–2015: Ultraviolet and Mobile Orchestra ===
On April 8, 2014, "Beautiful Times" was released and served as the lead single from his then-upcoming EP, which features violinist Lindsey Stirling. Young stated that he intended to release a steady "series of EPs" in 2014 rather than one larger recording. In June, Young announced that the first extended play would be titled Ultraviolet and it was released on June 27. The EP was written and produced entirely by Young himself. Young stated that the EP has an "edgier sound to Owl City than experienced before." On June 18, Owl City premiered a new track, "Wolf Bite" days before the release of the EP. The day before the EP's release, a music video for "Beautiful Times" premiered on the Rolling Stone's website. The EP peaked No. 30 on the Billboard 200 chart.

On October 4, Owl City performed at Fuji-Q Highland in Yamanashi, during a Tokyo Fantasy event. On October 7, Owl City released two new singles: "Tokyo" featuring Japanese pop group Sekai no Owari and "You're Not Alone" featuring American singer Britt Nicole. Owl City appeared on The Art of McCartney tribute album to Paul McCartney, covering the track "Listen to What the Man Said", which was released on November 18, 2014. In December 2014, Owl City released a new single for Christmas: "Kiss Me Babe, It's Christmas Time". He briefly toured in Japan in May 2015, playing three concert shows.

On May 11, 2015, he announced the release date and title of his fifth studio album, Mobile Orchestra for July 10. Young revealed that the album took longer to create than his previous records. The album features collaborations with numerous artists including Jake Owen, Hanson, Britt Nicole and Aloe Blacc. Additionally, Young worked with various producers on the album including Blacc, Joshua Crosby, Joey Moi and Ryan Williamson. On May 5, a sneak peek of Owl City's then-upcoming song "Verge" featuring Blacc aired on ESPN's "Draft Academy". The song was released as the lead single from the album on May 14 and peaked at No. 44 on the Japan Hot 100 chart. Owl City released the second single from the album, "My Everything", on June 5, 2015. The song reached number 22 on the US Hot Christian Songs chart. The third and final single from the album, "Unbelievable" featuring Hanson, was released on June 26. An animated video for the song was later released on June 29. Mobile Orchestra debuted on the Billboard 200 at No. 11. In support of the album, Owl City announced a headlining tour called the On the Verge Tour that began in the fall of 2015. He was supported by Rozzi Crane.

=== 2016–2021: Scores and Cinematic ===
On December 18, 2015, Young announced that he would focus on a new project titled "Adam Young Scores". During each month of 2016, he composed and recorded a score based on a subject of his choice, which is something he had wanted to accomplish for a long time. Around this time, Young also decided to part ways with Republic Records, allowing him to focus on this endeavor and give him a "bit of space and distance from the pop music space." On February 1, 2016, the first score, which is based on the Apollo 11 mission, was released on Young's "Adam Young Scores" website. This was followed by 10 additional scores on the first day of each month of 2016. In reflection of this discussion, each song, 10 scores, were all based on historical events that impacted Adam Young in some type of matter over the time of his entire career as a musical artist and personal lifetime.

On November 25, 2016, Owl City released a new Christmas song "Humbug" as a free download. On June 15, 2017, Owl City released "Not All Heroes Wear Capes", a song about Father's Day, with an acoustic video filmed in Owatonna, Minnesota, in Young's shop at home. On August 29, 2017, he released a song called "Clap Your Hands" for the 2017 golf game Everybody's Golf. On October 30, 2017, Young announced that he would be releasing an 18-track album, Cinematic, with a release date of June 1, 2018.

During the eight months from October to June, three EPs, which he has called Reels, were released, each with three songs from the upcoming album. When he started writing the album, he wanted to look somewhere else for inspiration other than his traditional place, which had primarily been his imagination, according to Young. He stated that the inspiration for this album is from "the amazing people he has met and the places that he has seen." Many of the album's songs are autobiographical. Originally intended as a non-album single, "Not All Heroes Wear Capes" was included on the album as the lead single. The album's second single, "All My Friends", was released on November 3, 2017. On December 1, Owl City released the first, Reel 1. On January 12, 2018, the third single from the album, "Lucid Dream", was released. Reel 2 was released on February 2. He released the fourth and final single, "New York City" on March 9. On April 6, Reel 3 was released. Cinematic was released in its entirety on June 1, and was solely written and produced by Young. The album has 15 main songs, plus alternate versions of "All My Friends", "Montana", and "Firebird". The album peaked at No. 115 on the Billboard 200. To support the album, Owl City went on the Cinematic Tour that began in the fall of 2018.

Owl City stayed quiet for the next couple years, but released a remix of "Jesus Freak" by DC Talk on January 1, 2021.

=== 2022–present: return of Owl City and Coco Moon ===
Owl City released a remix cover of "All Star" by Smash Mouth on May 13, 2022. In June 2022, Owl City announced that he would be releasing new music soon. He began making cryptic posts on the social media app Instagram. On August 12, 2022, a track he was featured on by Armin van Buuren and Gareth Emery titled "Forever and Always" was released.

Young began recording his seventh studio album sometime in 2022, before taking a short break to record a song titled, "Up to the Cloud" for the mobile game, Neural Cloud. The first single from the new album, "Kelly Time", was released on January 6, 2023. The second single was released on February 3, titled "Adam, Check Please".

On February 9, Owl City announced via social media that he would release an 11-track album titled Coco Moon on March 24, 2023. Young described the album as a "very Owl City album," containing themes of "autobiographical", "metaphorical", and "odd" songs. "Vitamin Sea" was released on March 3, as the third and final single from the album. Coco Moon peaked at number 94 on the US Top Current Albums Sales chart. In support of the album, Young announced the To the Moon Tour that began in the fall of 2023, with support from special guest Augustana. In September 2023, Young made a guest appearance on the deluxe edition of The Beautiful Letdown (Our Version) by Switchfoot, performing the song "Gone". Owl City toured in Japan for his To the Moon tour in February 2024. Another leg was added in the United States for March and April 2024. Young released a cover of Augustana's "Boston" as a single on February 9. On March 22, Owl City released the deluxe edition of Coco Moon, which featured the single "Car Trouble".

== Musical styles and influences ==
Owl City's music is described as indietronica and synth-pop and is often described as belonging to the electronic music genre. Young has stated that he is inspired by disco and European electronic music, as well as instrumental genres such as drone, ambient, and post-rock. He cites his biggest influences as Johnathon Ford of Unwed Sailor and Thomas Newman. As he is a vocal Christian, Young also incorporates his faith into some of his music. Young's faith is evident on the album, All Things Bright and Beautiful, especially in the song "Galaxies". Explaining why the faith-filled song was added to the mix he said, "I feel like, if I were ever to hide the fact that that's what's so important to me, it would be a crime that I should probably be put in jail for." "Tidal Wave", "Meteor Shower" and "Hello Seattle" from Ocean Eyes also references his faith to God.

Owl City also has been compared to The Postal Service, often critically, for his combination of fuzzy synths, ironic lyrics, and use of female guest singers. Pitchfork goes to say that "the surprise No. 1 single in the country, Owl City's 'Fireflies', jacks the Postal Service in such a bald-faced, obvious manner that getting into specifics feels redundant at best and tacky at worst." In response to the suggestion that his work is derivative, Young suggested in a 2009 interview with The New York Times that Ocean Eyes is perhaps the "next chapter" after the Postal Service: "The Postal Service released a record in 2003, and that was it. There was really nothing to compare it to until someone else came along and wrote the next chapter. Maybe that's this record. Maybe that's this band."

== Touring band ==
Owl City is one of Young's many solo projects, with all music written, composed, recorded, and produced by him. During live performances he is accompanied by a group of supporting musicians:

Current touring members

- Lorin Lemme – drums (2023–present)
- Daniel Tavani – cello (2023–present)

Former touring members

- Casey Brown – drums (2011)
- Matthew Decker – drums (2009–2010)
- Breanne Düren – keyboards, backing vocals (2009–2015)
- Steve Goold – drums (2012–2013)
- Matthew "Goose" Gusmer – drums (2018)
- Gabriel Hagan – drums (2013–2015)
- Cody Johnson – guitar (2018)
- Daniel Jorgensen – guitar, vibraphone, bass guitar (2010–2013)
- Rob Morgan – bass guitar, music producer (2014–2015)
- Laura Musten – violin (2009–2011)
- Jasper Nephew – guitar (2012–2015)
- Hannah Schroeder – cello (2009–2011)
- Austin Tofte – keys, vocals (2009)

== Concert tours ==
Headlining

- Ocean Eyes World Tour (2010)
- All Things Bright and Beautiful World Tour (2011)
- The Midsummer Station World Tour (2012)
- On the Verge Tour (2015)
- Cinematic Tour (2018)
- To the Moon Tour (2023–2024)

== Discography ==
- Maybe I'm Dreaming (2008)
- Ocean Eyes (2009)
- All Things Bright and Beautiful (2011)
- The Midsummer Station (2012)
- Mobile Orchestra (2015)
- Cinematic (2018)
- Coco Moon (2023)

== Awards and nominations ==
Year	Association	Category	Nominated work	Result	Ref.
2009	Žebřík Music Awards	Best International Discovery	Owl City	Nominated	
2010	ARIA Awards	Most Popular International Artist	Owl City	Nominated	
2010	Q Awards	Best Track	"Fireflies"	Nominated	
2010	The Record of the Year	Record of the Year	"Fireflies"	Won	
2010	Billboard Japan Music Awards	Hot 100 Airplay of the Year	"Fireflies"	Won	
2010	Billboard Japan Music Awards	Adult Contemporary of the Year	"Fireflies"	Nominated	
2011	Billboard Music Awards	Top Dance/Electronic Album	Ocean Eyes	Nominated	
2011	BDS Certified Spin Awards	400,000 Spins	"Fireflies"	Won	
2011	Flecking Awards	Best Video	"Fireflies"	Nominated	
2012	Vevo Certified Awards	100,000,000 Views	"Good Time"^{^[a]}	Won	
2012	Billboard Japan Music Awards	Hot Top Airplay of the Year	"Good Time"^{^[a]}	Won	
2012	Billboard Japan Music Awards	Digital & Airplay Overseas of the Year	"Good Time"^{^[a]}	Won	
2012	NRJ Music Awards	International Group/Duo of the Year	"Good Time"^{^[a]}	Nominated	
2012	Phoenix Film Critics Society Awards	Best Original Song	"When Can I See You Again?"	Nominated	
2013	Annie Awards	Music in a Feature Production	Wreck-It Ralph^{^[b]}	Won	
2013	Vevo Certified Awards	100,000,000 Views	"Fireflies"	Won	

Notes

- ^{^[a]} shared with Carly Rae Jepsen
- ^{^[b]} shared with Henry Jackman, Skrillex, Matthew Thiessen, Jamie Houston and Yasushi Akimoto
