= Wolf Bite =

Promotional single by Owl City

from the EP Ultraviolet
- Released: June 18, 2014
- Genre: EDM; synth-pop
- Length: 3:49
- Label: Republic
- Songwriter: Adam Young
- Producer: Young

Music video
- "Wolf Bite" (visualizer) on YouTube

"Wolf Bite" is a song by American electronica project Owl City. The song was released on June 18, 2014, as a promotional single from his fourth extended play, Ultraviolet. The song reached number 22 on the Christian Rock Songs chart and number 48 on the Dance/Electronic Digital Song Sales chart.

== Background ==
According to Adam Young, "Wolf Bite" is about, "becoming a better person and how the trials and difficult tribulations of life can grow you up." Young described the song as a "dreamy minimalist verse" with a "shimmering hook that resounds with a primal power." The song was inspired by the 2010 period horror film The Wolfman.

== Composition and lyrics ==
Written and produced by Young, the track runs at 128 BPM and is in the key of D major. Musically, the song has been described as an EDM and synth-pop track, featuring Owl City's signature melodies. However, the lyrics are more melancholy than is typically found in Owl City's music, saying, "It's another bad dream, poison in my bloodstream / I'm dying but I can't scream, will you show me the way." The lyrical interpretation of the song is a "call for God's help."

== Critical reception ==
"Wolf Bite" was generally well received by music critics. Scott Fryberger of Jesus Freak Hideout called the song, "a half mid-tempo, half dancey track that again hearkens back a few years to All Things Bright and Beautiful." In a review of Ultraviolet for Renowned for Sound, Marcus Floyd stated of the song, "The echo resonating from the end of each line in 'Wolf Bite' may grind your gears a little, but if you're after some punchy EDM/pop Owl City style, this is the track for you." The song is considered to be a "fan favorite" from the EP.

== Music video ==
"Wolf Bite" was released on June 18, 2014, along with an audio video. A music video for the song premiered via MetroLyrics on July 17, 2014, and was directed by Andrew William Ralph. The music video features clips of a werewolf riding a bicycle and has a mix of live action shots combined with some colorful animated overlays.

== Charts ==
Chart performance for "Wolf Bite"
Chart (2014)	Peak position
US Christian Rock Songs (Billboard)	22
US Dance/Electronic Digital Song Sales (Billboard)	48
