= To the Sky (Owl City song) =

Single by Owl City

from the album Legend of the Guardians: The Owls of Ga'Hoole
- Released: August 24, 2010
- Genre: Pop
- Length: 3:39
- Label: Universal; WaterTower Music
- Songwriter: Adam Young
- Producer: Young

Owl City singles chronology
"Umbrella Beach" (2010)	"To the Sky" (2010)	"Peppermint Winter" (2010)

Music video
- "To the Sky" on YouTube

"To the Sky" is a song by American electronica project Owl City from the 2010 film Legend of the Guardians: The Owls of Ga'Hoole. It was released as a single on August 24, 2010, via Universal Records and WaterTower Music. "To the Sky" was also featured as a bonus track on the German and Japanese deluxe releases of Owl City's third studio album, All Things Bright and Beautiful.

== Background and composition ==
On August 24, 2010, it was announced that Young had penned a new song to serve as the theme for the 2010 animated film, Legend of the Guardians: The Owls of Ga'Hoole. Selected as the soundtrack's first single, the song was featured throughout the movie and its closing credits. He was contacted by Warner Bros. Studio after they heard his single, "Fireflies". According to Young, the filmmakers wanted something upbeat and optimistic that fit the mood and aesthetic of the film.

"To the Sky" was written and produced by Adam Young. He stated that it was an "incredible honor" working on the song for the film. Young also added, "As a fan of both the children's book series growing up, and Zack Snyder's work as a director, having my music included is pretty surreal. I've been waiting for someone to make a movie like this for some time now. I'm endlessly grateful to be involved." The track runs at 175 BPM and is in the key of B major.

== Music video ==
The music video for "To the Sky" premiered on September 15, 2010, via VEVO and was directed by Danny Yourd.

== Track listing ==
Digital download
No.	Title	Length
1.	"To the Sky"	3:39

CD single
No.	Title	Length
1.	"To the Sky"	3:42
2.	"To the Sky" (Music Video)	3:49

== Charts ==
Chart performance for "To the Sky"
Chart (2010)	Peak position
CIS Airplay (TopHit)	187
US Bubbling Under Hot 100 Singles (Billboard)	25
US Rock Digital Song Sales (Billboard)	13

== Release history ==
Release dates for "To the Sky"
Region	Date	Format	Label	Ref.
Various	August 24, 2010	Digital download	Universal Republic	
