= Peppermint Winter =

Single by Owl City
- Released: November 22, 2010
- Recorded: 2010
- Genre: Synth-pop; electropop; Christmas
- Length: 4:00
- Label: Universal Republic
- Songwriter: Adam Young
- Producer: Young

Owl City singles chronology
"To the Sky" (2010)	"Peppermint Winter" (2010)	"Alligator Sky" (2011)

"Peppermint Winter" is a song by American electronica project Owl City. The song was released on November 22, 2010, as a Christmas single. The song was written and produced by Adam Young.

== Background ==
Adam Young of Owl City was working on his third studio album, when he decided to release a Christmas single, "Peppermint Winter" on iTunes in November 2010. He wrote on Last.fm that it is about his "...own participation in snowball fights and sidewalk shoveling. Sleigh rides, present-giving and receiving and of course, the ingestion of marvelous Yuletide nutrition (or lack thereof), namely sugar cookies, hot chocolate and peppermint candy canes..."

== Composition ==
"Peppermint Winter" is a light, waltz-like song that incorporates synth beats and vocals. The beat is mainly formed by jingle bells and occasional heavy drums. Piano is often featured, as well as some orchestrations, such as wooden string instruments and woodwinds. The track runs at 154 BPM and is in the key of C major. Adam's range in the song spans from the notes C4 to A5.

== Critical reception ==
"Peppermint Winter" received positive reviews from music critics. Becky Bain of the Idolator stated, "the saccharine love song to snowballs and sleigh rides gives us the same feeling we get when we eat too many candy canes in one sitting." The Napster blog gave the song a positive review, writing that the song "is cut from the same cloth" as his previous song "Fireflies" and calling the song "light and sugary like the candy canes on a Christmas tree". The review continues stating that while the song "might not become a classic like "Christmas Wrapping" from The Waitresses", "who can really say no to just one more Christmas song?" Athena Serrano of MTV called the track an, "electropop holiday bop filled with the magic and whimsical spirit of the festive season," praising the song for its, "mystical synths."

== Charts ==
Chart performance for "Peppermint Winter"
Chart (2010)	Peak position
Belgium (Ultratip Bubbling Under Flanders)	21
Canada (Canadian Hot 100)	65
Canada AC (Billboard)	31
US Bubbling Under Hot 100 Singles (Billboard)	8
US Holiday Digital Song Sales (Billboard)	2

== Release history ==
Release history for "Peppermint Winter"
Region	Date	Format	Label	Ref.
Various	November 22, 2010	Digital download	Universal Republic	
Australia	December 6, 2010	CD	Universal Republic	
United States	December 14, 2010	CD	Universal Republic	
