= Of June =

EP by Owl City
- Released: August 29, 2007
- Recorded: July 2007
- Studio: Sky Harbor (Owatonna, Minnesota)
- Genre: Synth-pop
- Length: 25:52
- Label: Sky Harbor; Universal Republic
- Producer: Adam Young

Owl City chronology
Of June (2007)	Maybe I'm Dreaming (2008)

Alternative cover
- iTunes cover

Of June is the first EP by American electronic music project Owl City. It was uploaded by Adam Young to his Myspace page on August 29, 2007. The EP was released digitally on December 16, 2008.

Following the surprise success of Owl City's second studio album, Ocean Eyes, Of June was pressed and re-released by Universal Republic on April 21, 2009.

== Background ==
On a weekend in June 2007, Young was alone in his parents house for a couple of days and began composing melodies and lyrics. He ended up writing seven tracks for "an EP's worth of music." Of June was recorded in July 2007, and was produced, mastered and recorded by Young. He released the EP on MySpace which resulted in garnering an online fan base. Young reflected on the EP, noting that he had not listened to it since it was released and stated, "I prefer not to look back at old work. It keeps my vision for future creations much less biased. It also makes me cringe."

== Critical reception ==
Professional ratings
Review scores
Source	Rating
AllMusic	4/5 stars
Jesus Freak Hideout	4/5 stars

Of June was generally received with positive reviews. Jared Johnson of AllMusic stated, "His lyrics are poetry for a surprising number of souls who, like him, seem to have grown tired of the standard Top 40 fare." He praised the song "Hello Seattle" calling the track, "the heart of the album," whilst also remarking, "each song has elements of brilliance." Zach Hall of Jesus Freak Hideout praised the EP writing, "Young's voice shines through track by track while his beats and synth brings us back to 'Fireflies' fame" and said the EP is "a fantastic addition to any emotronic/synthpop fan's collection." He additionally complimented songs such as "Hello Seattle" and "Fuzzy Blue Lights", calling them "favorites."

== Track listing ==
All tracks are written by Adam Young.

No.	Title	Length
1.	"Swimming in Miami"	4:55
2.	"Captains and Cruise Ships"	3:24
3.	"Designer Skyline"	3:28
4.	"Panda Bear"	3:08
5.	"The Airway"	3:20
6.	"Fuzzy Blue Lights"	4:40
7.	"Hello Seattle"	2:57
Total length:		25:52

=== Notes ===
- "Hello Seattle" was later re-recorded and included on his second studio album Ocean Eyes.

== Charts ==
Chart performance for Of June
Chart (2009–10)	Peak position
South Korean Albums (Gaon)	38
US Top Dance/Electronic Albums (Billboard)	15

== Release history ==
Release history and formats for Of June
Region	Date	Format	Label	Ref.
United States	August 29, 2007	Digital download	Sky Harbor	
Europe	December 16, 2008	CD; digital download	Sky Harbor; Island	
Various	December 16, 2008	Digital download	Sky Harbor	
Various	April 21, 2009	CD	Sky Harbor; Universal Republic	
Various	March 30, 2010	Digital download	Sky Harbor; Universal Republic	
