= Dreams Don't Turn to Dust =

Promotional single by Owl City

from the album All Things Bright and Beautiful
- Released: October 10, 2011
- Studio: Sky Harbor Studios
- Genre: Electropop; synth-pop
- Length: 3:44
- Label: Universal Republic
- Songwriter: Adam Young
- Producer: Young

"Dreams Don't Turn to Dust" is a song by American electronica project Owl City. The song was released on October 10, 2011, as the second promotional single from his third studio album, All Things Bright and Beautiful via Universal Republic. It was released exclusively in the United Kingdom.

== Background and release ==
On April 6, 2011, Young released previews of four tracks from the album including "Dreams Don't Turn to Dust". In an interview with Sugarscape, Young confirmed that the song would be the next single from the album released on October 10, 2011. Speaking about how the song came together, he stated, "Outside of music I've always dreamed of being an underwater welder - like a commercial scuba diver who dives down and welds rivets under water."

== Composition ==
"Dreams Don't Turn to Dust" was written and produced by Adam Young. The track runs at 104 BPM and is in the key of E-flat major. Young's range in the song spans from the notes B♭3 – B♭5. The song incorporates synth-pop with influences of hip-hop. Young stated he was inspired by the American hip-hop group A Tribe Called Quest. He stated, "I wanted to use a hip-hop influence that no one would expect. I was listening to a lot of Tribe and I love that sort of walking speed of their beats. I knew I wanted to try and pull from that." During the song's breakdown, the track features a similar sound to Owl City's hit song, "Fireflies".

== Critical reception ==
Professional ratings
Review scores
Source	Rating
AltSounds	(70%)

AltSounds gave a positive review describing the track as a "feel-good electropop song." They compared the song to Coldplay's "Paradise" for its "easily digestible, crescendo sense." They ended off stating, "an outsider might notice a twinkle in the listeners eye, perhaps even a spring in ones step."

== Live performances ==
"Dreams Don't Turn to Dust" was performed live regularly during the All Things Bright and Beautiful Tour and was featured in Owl City's video album Owl City: Live From Los Angeles. The performance from the video album was released on September 15, 2011, via VEVO and was directed by Mark Lucas.

== Personnel ==
Owl City

- Adam Young – vocals, lyricist, mixing, recording engineer, producer

Additional musicians and production

- Laura Musten – violin
- Daniel Jorgensen – vibraphone
- Steve Bursky – executive producer

== Charts ==
Chart performance for "Dreams Don't Turn to Dust"
Chart (2011)	Peak position
US Dance/Electronic Digital Song Sales (Billboard)	26

== Release history ==
Release dates for "Dreams Don't Turn to Dust"
Region	Date	Format	Label	Ref.
United Kingdom	October 10, 2011	CD single	Universal Republic	
