= Up to the Cloud =

Single by Owl City
- Released: November 25, 2022
- Recorded: 2022
- Genre: Synth-pop
- Length: 2:52
- Label: Neural Cloud
- Songwriter: Adam Young
- Producer: Young

Owl City singles chronology
"New York City" (2018)	"Up to the Cloud" (2022)	"Kelly Time" (2023)

Music video
- "Up to the Cloud" on YouTube

"Up to the Cloud" is a song by American electronica act Owl City. The song first premiered on November 21, 2022, before it was released as a single on November 25. The song serves as the theme song for the mobile game, Neural Cloud. It is Owl City's first song in four years since the release of his sixth studio album, Cinematic.

== Background and composition ==
"Up to the Cloud" was written and produced by Adam Young. Young was recording his seventh studio album, Coco Moon when he was approached by the developer of Sunborn Network Technology to compose the track. They stated that, "Adam Young's 'particular brand of upbeat yet wistful, mellifluous, and straight-up groovy synth-pop artistry' was a perfect match for Neural Cloud's theme of exploring consciousness."

Lyrically, the song contains references of the game and the track has been described as "thematic and melodic." The song's meaning is described as a track that, "dives into the game's philosophical ponderings on artificial intelligence and what it means to be 'human' in a world beyond the meat and bones of the natural body."

== Critical reception ==
"Up to the Cloud" was met with generally positive reviews. Nick Yopko of EDM.com stated, "Upbeat and happy, the track features a bouncy synth-heavy groove that highlights the vocal talents of the 'Fireflies' creator. The synth is especially pronounced at the end of the song where a fun keyboard solo takes center stage to close out the tune." Kara Dennison of Otaku USA remarked, "Sometimes Owl City just says things... sometimes wordplay, sometimes evocative phrases that may not make complete sense, but take your brain where it needs to go. As metaphorical as it could be, we know by now he's referencing the primary mechanic and narrative hook of Neural Cloud. Jack Rogers of Rock Sound called the track, "catchy as it is crisp." He praised the song for its, "Loud melodies, flipping synths and sky-high euphoria" that is likely to "put a smile on your face." The song garnered more than half a million streams within the first week of its release.

== Music video ==
The music video for "Up to the Cloud" premiered via YouTube on November 21, 2022. The video features characters and environments from the game grappling with "the idea of uploading his consciousness and the whole concept of humans and AI."

== Release history ==
Release history for "Up to the Cloud"
Region	Date	Format	Label	Ref.
Various	November 25, 2022	Digital download	Neural Cloud	
