= Deer in the Headlights (song) =

Promotional single by Owl City

from the album All Things Bright and Beautiful
- Released: May 23, 2011
- Genre: Emo pop
- Length: 2:58
- Label: Republic
- Songwriter: Adam Young
- Producer: Young

Music video
- "Deer in the Headlights" on YouTube

"Deer in the Headlights" is a song by American electronic project Owl City. The song was released on May 23, 2011, as the first promotional single from his third studio album, All Things Bright and Beautiful. In promotion of the single, a music video was released on June 30, 2011.

== Background and release ==
On May 16, 2011, Young began posting teasers for "Deer in the Headlights" on his website. He would stream layers of the track during the next five days to promote the single. On the first day, he posted the drum track of the song and followed with the bass line the next day. The song premiered on Owl City's website on May 20, 2011, before it was released digitally on May 23. The following day, the song was serviced to contemporary hit radio.

Upon the release of "Deer in the Headlights", Young stated he was excited about the release of the song. Young told Spin that the track is "big and energetic" and that "it's got a huge sound." The song comically describes Young's search for love in all the wrong places. In an interview with JSYK.com, Young stated that the song is about "fending off the blinding light of superficial fluff relationships."

== Composition ==
"Deer in the Headlights" was written and produced by Adam Young. According to the sheet music published at Musicnotes.com, by Alfred Music Publishing, the track runs at 138 BPM and is in the key of D major. Young's range in the song spans from the notes A3 to A5. According to Young, the song is the most personal track on the album and highlights an ending relationship that ruined both lives that were involved. He also mentioned that he wrote the song as a way to vent his frustration.

"I wrote a personal song that plays close to the chest in a way that no other song I've written ever has. I was ending a serious relationship at the time, and I was harrowed by the fact that so many people [specifically me] have a funny tendency to desire romance merely for the sake of avoiding loneliness, which ultimately means it's not about love at all!... So the song plays closely to the fact that I needed to pull myself out of the lights and remember what's more important than the romantic butterflies."

"Deer in the Headlights" is described as an upbeat track, despite its depressing lyrical tone. The song features drums, bass, and electric guitar high up in the mix with a couple of synth leads and the track was inspired by Blink-182.

== Critical reception ==
"Deer in the Headlights" was met with positive reviews from music critics. Chad Grischow of IGN praised the comical lyrics that, "work great as a lonesome Young looks for love in all the wrong places, getting more than a brush off from the ladies." Glenn Gamboa of Newsday described as the song as, "emo-pop-tinged." Scott Shetler of PopCrush stated, "Young ditches his usual dreamy, ethereal style for layered, whirring synths that add a touch of dance music to the song... The synths drop out during the more rock-sounding chorus, when electric guitars take over as Young sings." He ended the review by calling the track, "the best Owl City song."

== Music video ==
On June 21, 2011, a preview for the "Deer in the Headlights" music video was released. The music video officially premiered on June 30, 2011 via AOL and was directed by Steve Hoover. The video was inspired by the 1985 science fiction film, Back to the Future and was shot in parts of Mint Canyon, Santa Clarita. Young described the music video as a "quirky video for a cheeky song." Going more in-depth about the music video, Young spoke with The Hollywood Reporter stating, "It was a collaborative idea between my director and myself. We came up with some incredible concepts, pulling from Back to the Future and the 80s in general. Shooting the video was a blast and I can't believe I got to drive the actual DeLorean from the old films. As a big fan of the trilogy, it was kind of a dream come true."

The music video begins with Young skateboarding when a DeLorean magically appears. Young hops into the car and is seen travelling down the "highway of life" with his imagination seeing everything from a jellyfish to a Tyrannosaurus. The music video features a guest appearance from Canadian electropop musician Lights.

== Live performances ==
Owl City performed "Deer in the Headlights" on Jimmy Kimmel Live! on July 20, 2011, in his first ever televised performance. The song was also performed live regularly during the All Things Bright and Beautiful Tour and was featured in Owl City's live album, Owl City: Live From Los Angeles.

== Track listing ==
CD single
| No. | Title | Length |
|---|---|---|
| 1. | "Deer in the Headlights" | 3:00 |

Digital download
| No. | Title | Length |
|---|---|---|
| 1. | "Deer in the Headlights" | 2:58 |

== Charts ==
Chart performance for "Deer in the Headlights"
| Chart (2011) | Peak position |
|---|---|
| South Korea International Chart (GAON) | 145 |

== Release history ==
Release history for "Deer in the Headlights"
| Region | Date | Format | Label | Ref. |
|---|---|---|---|---|
| Various | May 23, 2011 | Digital download; streaming | Republic | |
| United States | May 24, 2011 | Contemporary hit radio | Republic | |
| Germany | August 11, 2011 | Digital download | Universal Motown | |
