= Alligator Sky =

Single by Owl City featuring Shawn Chrystopher

from the album All Things Bright and Beautiful
- Released: March 22, 2011
- Recorded: 2010–2011
- Genre: Electropop; hip hop
- Length: 3:05 (album version); 3:14 (No Rap edit); 3:11 (version featuring B.o.B); 3:07 (version featuring Big Boi)
- Label: Universal Republic
- Songwriters: Adam Young; Shawn Chrystopher; Bobby Ray Simmons Jr.; Antwan André Patton
- Producer: Adam Young

Owl City singles chronology
"Peppermint Winter" (2010)	"Alligator Sky" (2011)	"Galaxies" (2011)

Shawn Chrystopher singles chronology
"One of My Homies" (2010)	"Alligator Sky" (2011)	"Minding My Business" (2013)

Audio sample
- file; help

"Alligator Sky" is a song by American electronica project Owl City from his third studio album All Things Bright and Beautiful. It was released as the lead single from the album on March 22, 2011. The song was written and produced by Adam Young. The song reached number five on the US Bubbling Under Hot 100. It also debuted at the No. 1 spot on the iTunes Electronic Track chart.

== Background ==
Adam Young stated in an interview with AOL that he experimented with different sounds on the album All Things Bright and Beautiful and that "Alligator Sky" is where he 'pulled the hip-hop vibe, stating; "... I am a big fan of the way hip-hop music is put together and everything that goes into it—being so beat-heavy and just focusing on the rhythm side of it, sometimes more than melody. But I wanted to marry those two ideas and just focus on the rhythm side of it then have this rapper do verses just as a new look to it."

According to Young, the song was inspired by the 2008 animated science fiction film, WALL-E. Explaining the concept of the title of the song, he stated, "It's about how there are so many weird things coming at you every day. Why not just meet them head on and take charge even though you have no say over what's going to happen? You and those around you are what matter most."

== Versions ==
Four versions of the song were released: The first features Californian rapper Shawn Chrystopher, the second version omits Chrystopher's vocals, a third version featuring Atlanta rapper B.o.B leaked online, and a fourth version featuring vocals by Big Boi of Atlanta hip-hop duo OutKast also leaked online.

Speaking about his decision on making a rap and non-rap version of "Alligator Sky", Young wanted to "experiment with something new." Since he created the track based around a hip hop sound, he wanted to find a rapper to fill in the verses. Shawn Chrystopher was recommended to Young, a friend one of his publishers knew, and after Chrystopher sent a demo to Young, they began passing files to each other over the internet. This version was serviced to radio as the album's lead single and because the label wanted a version that can be serviced to alternative radio, a non-rap version was recorded.

The version of "Alligator Sky" featuring Shawn Chrystopher runs at 92 BPM and is in the key of D major. The vocal range in the song spans from the notes B3 to B5.

== Critical reception ==
"Alligator Sky" was met with positive reviews from music critics. Billboard magazine stated, "it's pretty much an exact rewrite of Young's original smash, from the bubbly electronics to the Ben Gibbard-approved melodic choices to the overblown optimism." Robbie Daw of Idolator praised the Long Lost Sun remix version of the song for its, "dreamy keyboard riffs, insistent hand claps and upbeat production" that brings out Owl City's "wall of sound."

== Music video ==
The music video for "Alligator Sky" premiered on VEVO on April 29, 2011. It was released elsewhere such as MTV and iTunes on May 6, and was directed by Steve Hoover and produced by Endeavor Media. Young uploaded 'Behind the Scenes' footage of the video a few days prior to the release on April 22, which explained the concept for the video; saying that it's about two men (Young and Chrystopher) leaving earth, but unlike many videos with a similar theme, they aren't leaving a post-apocalyptic earth, instead, there is a big celebration about leaving a very polluted earth. In the video the earth is shown as a planet that has terrible living conditions. The celebration is because they are leaving earth to find a better planet in outer space. As shown in the music video the duo are taking samples of earth with them to outer space to archive them.

Young's "Alligator Sky" self makes an appearance at the end of the music video for "Deer in the Headlights" where he is nearly run over by himself driving the DeLorean (from Back to the Future) after coming to the year 2015.

== Track listing ==
CD single
No.	Title	Length
1.	"Alligator Sky"	3:13

Digital download
No.	Title	Length
1.	"Alligator Sky" (featuring Shawn Chrystopher)	3:04
2.	"Alligator Sky" (No Rap Edit)	3:14
3.	"Alligator Sky" (Long Lost Sun Remix)	3:11

7" vinyl
No.	Title	Length
1.	"Alligator Sky" (featuring Shawn Chrystopher)	3:04
2.	"Alligator Sky" (Long Lost Sun Remix)	3:11

== Charts ==
Chart performance for "Alligator Sky"
Chart (2011)	Peak position
Belgium (Ultratip Bubbling Under Flanders)	16
Denmark Airplay (Tracklisten)	10
Germany (Youth Airplay Chart)	17
Germany (Airplay Chart)	68
Japan (Japan Hot 100)	32
South Korea (GAON) (International Chart)	40
UK Airplay (Music Week)	49
US Bubbling Under Hot 100 Singles (Billboard)	5

== Release history ==
Release dates and formats for "Alligator Sky"
Region	Date	Format	Label	Ref.
United States	March 22, 2011	Digital download	Universal Republic	
United Kingdom	March 28, 2011	Contemporary hit radio	Universal Republic	
Various	April 12, 2011	Digital download	Universal Republic	
United States	April 26, 2011	Contemporary hit radio	Universal Republic	
