= Lonely Lullaby =

Single by Owl City

from the album All Things Bright and Beautiful
- Released: July 19, 2011
- Recorded: 2010–11
- Genre: Pop; emo pop
- Length: 4:30
- Label: Universal Republic
- Songwriter: Adam Young
- Producer: Adam Young

Owl City singles chronology
"Galaxies" (2011)	"Lonely Lullaby" (2011)	"Angels" (2011)

"Lonely Lullaby" is a song by American electronica project Owl City from his third studio album All Things Bright and Beautiful (2011). Originally released as a fan club exclusive in March 2011, the song is not included on the standard edition of the album itself. It was released digitally on July 19, 2011, through Universal Republic Records and was included as a bonus track for All Things Bright and Beautiful as the album's third single.

== Background ==
The song is a tribute to Annmarie Monson, an ex-girlfriend of Young's, who he describes as the "most wonderful, beautiful woman" he knew. He stated that the track was a lot more "personal" to him.

"A lot of my songs are written purely from the imagination and some have no representation of my personal life, but 'Lonely Lullaby' was the first song I wrote almost entirely about something as personal as a romantic relationship... The song is, in fact, so personal, it almost hurts to listen to it now that such a perfect relationship has come to an end. I wasn't sure if I had something as 'genuine and pure' inside of me but the song basically wrote itself and I'm proud of it.

== Composition ==
"Lonely Lullaby" is a melancholy-influenced piano ballad written and produced by Adam Young of Owl City. According to the digital sheet music published by Universal Music Publishing Group, the song was originally composed in the key of F♯ major and set in common time to a "flowing" tempo of 67, slowing down to 57,5 BPM at the end. "Lonely Lullaby" follows a chord progression of C♯ – G♯m – F♯ – C♯ – B – F♯ and Young's vocals span from a low note of C♯_{3} to a high note of B_{4}.

== Release ==
In March 2011, an app titled Owl City Galaxy was launched, where fans could pre-order the album and access content such as an exclusive bonus track not included in the album, early access to concert tickets and merch. The bonus track was revealed to be "Lonely Lullaby", where fans could stream the song exclusively. It was officially released as a single on July 19, 2011. The song was included on All Things Bright and Beautiful as a bonus track.

== Track listing ==
Digital download
No.	Title	Length
1.	"Lonely Lullaby"	4:30

== Charts ==
Chart performance for "Lonely Lullaby"
Chart (2011)	Peak position
South Korea (GAON) (International Chart)	136
US Bubbling Under Hot 100 Singles (Billboard)	12
US Pop Digital Song Sales (Billboard)	41
