= Galaxies (song) =

2011 single by Owl City

Single by Owl City

from the album All Things Bright and Beautiful
- Released: April 19, 2011
- Recorded: 2010–2011
- Genre: Contemporary Christian music; Eurodisco; synth-pop
- Length: 4:01
- Label: Universal Republic
- Songwriter: Adam Young
- Producer: Adam Young

Owl City singles chronology
"Alligator Sky" (2011)	"Galaxies" (2011)	"Lonely Lullaby" (2011)

Audio sample
- file; help

"Galaxies" is a song by American electronica act Owl City, released on April 19, 2011. It is the second single from his third studio album, All Things Bright and Beautiful. The song peaked at number 39 on the US Hot Christian Songs chart.

== Background ==
Adam Young has stated the song is about the Space Shuttle Challenger disaster. His idea and portrayal of the song is that "victory can be achieved through Christ and through Him alone," despite the tragedy.

"I wrote the song reflecting what I would be feeling and how I would answer for my life if I entered into eternity in a split second the way the victims did. The song is all about what I would say for myself if, all of a sudden, I was face to face with God and I had to answer for my actions in life."

Prior to the start of "Galaxies", a sample of Ronald Reagan's State of the Union speech was used and is titled "January 28, 1986", the date of the Space Shuttle Challenger disaster. He recalled hearing the speech and it "rekindled" his appreciation for astronauts and as a result, he wanted to pay his respects to them. The song was leaked onto the internet on April 11, 2011, before it was officially released on April 19. A lyrics video for the song premiered exclusively on Alternative Press on April 20, before it was released via YouTube on July 26, 2011.

== Composition ==
"Galaxies" was written and produced by Adam Young. According to the sheet music published at Musicnotes.com, by Alfred Music Publishing, the track runs at 120 BPM and is in the key of C major. Young's range in the song spans from the notes G4 to A5. The song is described as contemporary Christian music, Eurodisco and synth-pop. Young was hesitant at first to add his Christian faith to the song, as he felt he had "no business" adding his beliefs into his songs as a "mainstream artist". However, he ended up going through with it, making sure he was "right with God" and that it came off authentically.

== Chart performance ==
On April 19, 2011, "Galaxies" was released as the second single from the album. After release, the song had some airplay, primarily on Christian radio stations. The song peaked at number 39 on the Billboard Christian Songs chart.

== Charts ==
=== Weekly charts ===
Weekly chart performance for "Galaxies"
Chart (2011)	Peak position
Japan Adult Contemporary (Billboard Japan)	92
South Korea International (Gaon)	199
UK Christian Songs (Cross Rhythms)	4
US Christian Songs (Billboard)	39

=== Year-end charts ===
Year-end chart performance for "Galaxies"
Chart (2011)	Position
UK Christian Songs (Cross Rhythms)	31
US Christian CHR Songs (Billboard)	16

== Release history ==
Release history for "Galaxies"
Region	Date	Format	Label	Ref.
Various	April 19, 2011	Digital download; streaming	Universal	
United States	April 25, 2011	Christian radio	Universal	
