= All Things Bright and Beautiful (album) =

Studio album by Owl City
- Released: June 14, 2011
- Studios: Sky Harbor Studios (Owatonna, MN), Tree Sound Studios (Atlanta, GA), South Coast Studios (ON, Canada), The Brown Owl (Nashville, TN)
- Genres: Synth-pop; indietronica; electropop
- Length: 40:45
- Label: Universal Republic
- Producer: Adam Young

Owl City chronology
Ocean Eyes (2009)	All Things Bright and Beautiful (2011)	Shooting Star (2012)

Singles from All Things Bright and Beautiful
- 1. "Alligator Sky" Released: March 22, 2011; 2. "Galaxies" Released: April 19, 2011; 3. "Lonely Lullaby" Released: July 19, 2011; 4. "Angels" Released: September 20, 2011

All Things Bright and Beautiful is the third studio album by the American electronica project Owl City. It was released on June 14, 2011, by Universal Republic Records. Despite receiving mixed critical reviews, it became a commercial success, reaching No. 6 on the Billboard 200. Selling 48,000 copies first week, it became Owl City's highest charting album on the Billboard 200, to date. The album was preceded by its lead single "Alligator Sky" and second single "Galaxies". "Lonely Lullaby" was first released as an Owl City fan club exclusive in March 2011, before it was released as the album's third single in July. The album's fourth and final single "Angels" was serviced to Christian radio in September.

In support of the album, he embarked on his second headlining tour, the All Things Bright and Beautiful Tour from June to November 2011, as well as making his live debut televised performance on the Jimmy Kimmel Live! show in July.

The album's title is based on the hymn of the same name.

== Background and development ==
Production for the album began around mid-2010 after he returned home from his Ocean Eyes World Tour. Young recorded, engineered and produced the album himself, while also working with engineer and producer Jack Joseph Puig. Universal Republic first suggested that Owl City work with Dr. Luke and Starsmith on the album, however, his manager, Steve Bursky, "urged him to resist," explaining that his "single vision" is what made his previous album Ocean Eyes successful. While beginning the process of working on his third album, he said he put "a little bit of pressure on myself from myself," following the success of his hit single "Fireflies". The album features less autotuned and processed vocals, as Young wanted it to sound more "finished" than his previous album. Describing the sound as still "electronic," he also wanted the album to feature real instruments such as "live drums" and more guitar. A lot of the record was influenced by his experiences visiting places like Japan, Australia and New Zealand, while on tour. He also incorporated his Christian faith onto the album, which he was initially hesitant on adding, as he felt like he had "no business" in adding his beliefs to his music. However, wanting to be "right with God foremost" and the record to be "full of dangerous territory," he decided to include his faith.

In January 2011, it was announced that his third album would be released sometime in spring/summer of that year. The album was originally planned to have a worldwide release date of May 24, 2011. It was then changed to May 17. On April 6, however, Young posted on his official site that the release date had been bumped to June 14, 2011. He stated that the reason was a "last-minute" decision and was "to make sure the new single was set up properly and the music video was ready to go. I know it's always a bummer when these things happen, and people always want to know the back story, but that was purely a chance to take one more breath before the plunge. A month is a long time, but everybody's super fired-up." Along with this post were previews of four tracks from the new album, each being 1:30 long. The previews posted were of "Alligator Sky" (featuring Shawn Chrystopher), "Deer in the Headlights", "Galaxies" and "Dreams Don't Turn to Dust". Upon the release of the album, Young said of the expectations as "positive pressure." In March 2011, Owl City announced the All Things Bright and Beautiful Tour in support of the album, beginning on June 13, and concluding November 20. On July 20, Owl City made his live debut televised performance on the Jimmy Kimmel Live!, performing "Deer in the Headlights", in promotion of the album.

In an interview with Us Weekly on June 15, 2011, a day after the album's release, Young revealed that the album originally intended to have Taylor Swift as another guest, but was unable to do so, due to her being busy touring at the time. He also added about having her in a specific song, which may or may not be one of the songs in the album.

I was hoping to work with her on this new record. I had this great song that I was dying to have her voice in so I tried to get it on there but she was in Europe or Australia somewhere, very busy which I totally get having been on this wild roller coaster myself for the past two years. I can't even imagine what she's up against so it didn't work out, but maybe the next record. It would be awesome to feature her on a song someday. — Adam Young in Us Weekly interview.

== Composition and writing ==
The album sees Adam Young continuing his synth-pop stylings while also experimenting with indie rock, folk, European trance on "Galaxies" and rap on "Alligator Sky". Guest musicians on the album include Shawn Chrystopher, Matthew Thiessen, Lights, Breanne Düren and Adam Young's mother, Joan Young. Young experimented with hip-hop on the tracks "Alligator Sky", "Kamikaze" and "Dreams Don't Turn to Dust", the latter being influenced by A Tribe Called Quest. Other songs like "Deer in the Headlights" and "Angels" features more guitar, while keeping some electronic elements.

On the introductory track to "Galaxies", entitled "January 28, 1986" (the date of the Space Shuttle Challenger disaster), Ronald Reagan's State of the Union speech is sampled. The track "Galaxies" sees Young experimenting with trance and eurodisco music. Along with "Galaxies", the song "Angels" finds Young singing about his faith in Christianity. The album also includes acoustic and piano tracks like "Honey and the Bee" and "Plant Life", the latter was written in January and was a result of Young's "cabin fever." He said he wrote the song from the perspective of what life would "be like for a person trapped in a haunted house, where all these daisies are popping up through the floorboards." The former is a song about relationships, with a sound similar to "The Bird and the Worm" from Ocean Eyes. "The Real World" was influenced by escapism and daydreaming, which Young explained one of the lines on the song, "Reality is a lovely place but I wouldn't want to live there" as a way of showing his appreciation to life how it is, despite not being able to "change the world."

== Singles ==
The first official single released from the album was "Alligator Sky", featuring Californian rapper Shawn Chrystopher, was released on March 22, 2011. There are four versions of the track. The first version features Shawn Chrystopher, the second is a "No Rap Version" featuring different lyrics and Chrystopher's vocals are omitted, a third version featuring Atlanta rapper B.o.B leaked online, and a fourth version featuring vocals from Big Boi of Atlanta hip hop duo Outkast also leaked onto the internet. The song peaked at number five on the US Billboard Bubbling Under Hot 100.

On April 19, 2011, "Galaxies" was released as the second single from the album, and was made available for purchase and download on iTunes. The song peaked at number 39 on the US Hot Christian Songs chart, surpassing "Fireflies", which peaked at No. 44 (2010). It has since then re-entered the chart at No. 48 in the week of September 24, 2011.

"Galaxies" (2011)
Sample of the song "Galaxies" from Owl City's album All Things Bright and Beautiful.

In March 2011, an app titled Owl City Galaxy was launched, where an exclusive single, "Lonely Lullaby", was released to all members of Owl City Galaxy, a club that users automatically became a part of when they pre-ordered the album. The song mentions an "Annmarie" many times, a reference to Adam Young's ex-girlfriend, Annmarie Monson. This song, however, is not actually part of the standard edition of the album, though is included as an album bonus track. The app was discontinued in mid-2013. The song later was released as a single on July 19, 2011, making it officially available to people outside of Owl City Galaxy. The song has been met with some commercial success, peaking at number 12 on the Billboard Bubbling Under Hot 100.

"Angels" was released on September 20, 2011, as the fourth and final single from the album, where it was serviced to Christian radio stations. The song peaked at number 43 on the Billboard Dance/Electronic Digital Song Sales chart.

=== Promotional singles ===
"Deer in the Headlights" was released digitally on May 23, 2011. The single was announced in a different way than what is considered traditional. Starting on May 16, 2011, every day of that week part of the song would be added to the sneak peek. It was originally just called "New Song", and fans had to guess the new song. The first part of the song to be released were the drums, followed by the addition of bass, guitar, synthesizer, and vocals over the next four days. On the final day, the title for the song was announced. Electropop artist Lights made an appearance in the music video.

"Dreams Don't Turn to Dust" was released on October 10, 2011, as the second promotional single from the album. It was released exclusively in the United Kingdom.

== Critical reception ==
Professional ratings
Aggregate scores
Source	Rating
Metacritic	49/100
Review scores
Source	Rating
AllMusic	2.5/5 stars
Alternative Press	3.5/5 stars
Consequence of Sound	2.5/5 stars
Entertainment Weekly	B−
The Guardian	2/5 stars
NME	2/10
Q	3/5 stars
Rolling Stone	2/5 stars
Spin	5/10
USA Today	3/4 stars

All Things Bright and Beautiful has received mixed reviews, gaining a 49/100 score from Metacritic, an 8/10 score from IGN and a score of 5/10 from Spin. AllMusic writer Andrew Leahey praised the sound of the disc, calling Young "a top-notch producer; his music pops and fizzes with glitchy electronics, which he splashes throughout the track list like effervescent paint, and the songs all have an otherworldly sound about them, as though they were born in space and sent back to Earth in futuristic clothing." However, he derided the actual musical content, saying "there's no bite to Young’s sugary confections, no break from the electro-pop treacle that he churns out like an emo Willy Wonka." He ended up awarding the disc 2.5 stars of a possible 5. Caroline Sullivan of The Guardian stated that the album, "suffers from a lack of substance." Allison Stewart of The Washington Post called the album, "the Postal Service for tweens" at its best. Rudy K of Sputnikmusic remarked, "Adam's lyrics may be poetry, but it's All Things Bright and Beautiful's array of effervescent electro-pop backing tracks that make them into an organic artistic statement." She also stated that the album, "leaves no musical stone unturned."

A positive review came from Glenn Gamboa of Newsday. He remarked, "Young's gotten sharper lyrically and brought some new influences into his musical world." He praised the "nice change of pace" on the track "Kamikaze" and stated that "Galaxies", "is irresistible even before its Eurodisco-driven refrain." Scott Fryberger of Jesus Freak Hideout stated that the record, "will take the position of 2011's best pop album." Billboard magazine stated, "The melodies are so infectiously tuneful that you'd feel like you're kicking a puppy to say anything bad about them... the album has its darker and edgier moments in the aggressive attack of 'Kamikaze', the ambivalent twist of fate in 'Hospital Flowers' and the mournful tone of 'Galaxies'." Stephan Robinson of Cross Rhythms praised the Christian-themed nature of the album. He noted "Galaxies" as the highlight of the album, "due to both the Christian message and the catchy flying-through-space feel music that sticks in the mind as being a reminder that Owl City really is a top rate talent, despite what some of the trendier critics say."

== Commercial performance ==
In the US, the album debuted at No. 6 on the Billboard 200 chart selling 48,000 copies. In Germany, the album only reached No. 69 for one week before falling off the chart, charting lower than Ocean Eyes, which charted for 9 weeks and peaked at No. 7. In the United Kingdom, the album peaked at number 52 staying just one week on the chart. In Canada, All Things Bright and Beautiful peaked at number seven. To date, the album has sold 143,000 copies in the US.

== Track listing ==
All tracks are written by Adam Young, except where noted.

Standard edition
No.	Title	Writer(s)	Length
1.	"The Real World"		3:34
2.	"Deer in the Headlights"		3:00
3.	"Angels"		3:40
4.	"Dreams Don't Turn to Dust"		3:44
5.	"Honey and the Bee" (featuring Breanne Düren)		3:44
6.	"Kamikaze"		3:27
7.	"January 28, 1986" (Intro to "Galaxies")		0:37
8.	"Galaxies"		4:03
9.	"Hospital Flowers"		3:39
10.	"Alligator Sky" (featuring Shawn Chrystopher)	Adam Young, Shawn Chrystopher	3:05
11.	"The Yacht Club" (featuring Lights)		4:32
12.	"Plant Life"	Adam Young, Matt Thiessen	4:10
Total length:			40:45

iTunes bonus tracks
No.	Title	Length
13.	"How I Became the Sea"	4:25
14.	"Alligator Sky" (No Rap version)	3:15
Total length:		48:35

Owl City Galaxy bonus track
No.	Title	Length
1.	"Lonely Lullaby"	4:28

German iTunes and Japanese edition bonus tracks
No.	Title	Length
13.	"How I Became the Sea"	4:25
14.	"Shy Violet"	3:49
15.	"To the Sky"	3:40
Total length:		52:39

Taiwan edition bonus tracks
No.	Title	Length
13.	"Alligator Sky" (No Rap version)	4:28

== Personnel ==
Owl City

- Adam Young – vocals, keyboards, piano, synthesizers, guitars, bass, drums, programming, percussion, glockenspiel, marimba, accordion, producer, engineer, art direction, audio mixer

Additional musicians and production

- Breanne Düren – additional vocals on track 5
- Shawn Chrystopher – additional vocals on track 10
- Lights – additional vocals on track 11
- Joan Young – backing vocals on track 9
- Matthew Thiessen – backing vocals on track 12
- Laura Musten – violin on tracks 4, 6, 10 & 13
- Hannah Schroeder – cello on tracks 6, 7, 10 & 13
- Daniel Jorgensen – vibraphone on tracks 4 & 7
- Steve Bursky – producer, management & hand claps on track 5
- Ted Jensen – mastering
- StudioAKT – art direction
- Jack Joseph Puig – audio mixer
- Joe Corey – audio mixer assistant

== Charts ==
=== Weekly charts ===
Weekly chart performance for All Things Bright and Beautiful
Chart (2011)	Peak position
Australian Albums (ARIA)	33
Austrian Albums (Ö3 Austria)	65
Belgian Albums (Ultratop Flanders)	78
Canadian Albums (Billboard)	7
Danish Albums (Hitlisten)	27
Dutch Albums (Album Top 100)	100
German Albums (Offizielle Top 100)	69
Japanese Albums (Oricon)	31
Norwegian Albums (VG-lista)	33
Scottish Albums (Official Charts)	84
South Korean Albums (Circle)	49
Spanish Albums (Promusicae)	92
Swiss Albums (Schweizer Hitparade)	40
Taiwanese Albums (Five Music)	4
UK Albums (Official Charts)	52
US Billboard 200	6
US Top Dance Albums (Billboard)	2

=== Year-end charts ===
Year-end chart performance for All Things Bright and Beautiful
Chart (2011)	Position
Canadian Albums (Nielsen SoundScan)	118
US Top Dance/Electronic Albums (Billboard)	10
