= List of number-one albums of 2012 (Canada) =

These are the Canadian number-one albums of 2012. The chart is compiled by Nielsen Soundscan and published by Jam! Canoe, issued every Sunday. The chart also appears in Billboard magazine as Top Canadian Albums.

== Chart history ==
Key
†	Indicates best-performing album of 2012

Issue date	Album	Artist	Sales	References
January 7	Christmas	Michael Bublé		
January 14	21 †	Adele		
January 21	21 †	Adele	19,000	
January 28	21 †	Adele	14,000	
February 4	21 †	Adele	14,000	
February 11	21 †	Adele	14,000	
February 18	Old Ideas	Leonard Cohen	38,000	
February 25	21 †	Adele	21,000	
March 3	21 †	Adele	53,000	
March 10	21 †	Adele	28,000	
March 17	21 †	Adele		
March 24	Star Académie 2012	Various artists		
March 31	Up All Night	One Direction		
April 7	Tuskegee	Lionel Richie	18,000	
April 14	MDNA	Madonna	32,000	
April 21	Pink Friday: Roman Reloaded	Nicki Minaj		
April 28	21 †	Adele	10,000	
May 5	Love Is a Four Letter Word	Jason Mraz	19,300	
May 12	Blunderbuss	Jack White	16,600	
May 19	Blown Away	Carrie Underwood	17,300	
May 26	21 †	Adele	9,200	
June 2	Trespassing	Adam Lambert	7,300	
June 9	Born and Raised	John Mayer	17,800	
June 16	Born and Raised	John Mayer	7,790	
June 23	21 †	Adele	6,700	
June 30	Clockwork Angels	Rush	20,000	
July 7	Believe	Justin Bieber	57,000	
July 14	Living Things	Linkin Park	20,000	
July 21	Wild Ones	Flo Rida	14,300	
July 28	Uncaged	Zac Brown Band	8,100	
August 4	Wild Ones	Flo Rida	6,000	
August 11	Up All Night	One Direction		
August 18	God Forgives, I Don't	Rick Ross		
August 25	Believe	Justin Bieber		
September 1	Cabin Fever	Corb Lund		
September 8	The Midsummer Station	Owl City	3,700	
September 15	Havoc and Bright Lights	Alanis Morissette		
September 22	The Sheepdogs	The Sheepdogs		
September 29	Dead Silence	Billy Talent		
October 6	The Truth About Love	Pink		
October 13	Babel	Mumford & Sons		
October 20	Babel	Mumford & Sons		
October 27	Babel	Mumford & Sons		
November 3	Night Train	Jason Aldean		
November 10	Red	Taylor Swift		
November 17	Red	Taylor Swift		
November 24	Sans attendre	Celine Dion		
December 1	Take Me Home	One Direction		
December 8	Unapologetic	Rihanna		
December 15	Merry Christmas, Baby	Rod Stewart		
December 22	Merry Christmas, Baby	Rod Stewart		
December 29	Merry Christmas, Baby	Rod Stewart		

== See also ==
- List of Canadian Hot 100 number-one singles of 2012
