= This Kiss =

This Kiss may refer to:

- "This Kiss" (Carly Rae Jepsen song), 2012
- "This Kiss" (Faith Hill song), 1998
