= The Summer Kiss Tour =

2013 concert tour by Carly Rae Jepsen

- Tour by Carly Rae Jepsen
- Promotional poster for the tour
- Associated album: Kiss
- Start date: 24 May 2013
- End date: 12 October 2013
- No. of shows: 5 in Asia; 28 in North America; 33 total

Carly Rae Jepsen concert chronology
- The Summer Kiss Tour (2013); Gimmie Love Tour (2015–16)

The Summer Kiss Tour was the debut concert tour by Canadian singer Carly Rae Jepsen. It was launched in support of her second studio album, Kiss (2012). The tour received positive reviews and was a commercial success.

== Setlist ==
1. "This Kiss"
2. "I Know You Have a Girlfriend"
3. "Good Time" (with Jared Manierka)
4. "Tiny Little Bows"
5. "Sweetie"
6. "Take a Picture"
7. "Tug of War"
8. "Bucket"
9. "Curiosity"
10. "Almost Said It"
11. "Sour Candy"
12. "More Than a Memory"
13. "Tonight I'm Getting Over You"
14. "Turn Me Up"
15. "Hurt So Good"
16. "Guitar String / Wedding Ring"
17. "Your Heart Is a Muscle"
  Encore
18. "Call Me Maybe"

== Shows ==
List of concerts, showing date, city, country and venue
Date	City	Country	Venue
Asia
24 May 2013 (Note: The 24 May 2013 concert at the Gardens by the Bay in Singapore was part of The Singapore Social Concerts at The Meadow Gardens By the Bay.)	Central Region	Singapore	Gardens by the Bay
27 May 2013	Jakarta	Indonesia	Tennis Indoor Senayan
North America
8 June 2013	Portsmouth	United States	nTelos Wireless Pavilion
9 June 2013	Portland	United States	Portland Rose Festival
16 June 2013	Rochester	United States	Meadow Brook Amphitheatre
4 July 2013	Provo	United States	Lavall Edwards Stadium
14 July 2013	Saint Petersburg	United States	Tropicana Field
27 July 2013	Boise	United States	Boise Music Festival
31 July 2013	Columbus	United States	Ohio State Fair
2 August 2013	Bethlehem	United States	Bethlehem Musikfest
3 August 2013 (Note: The concert of 3 August 2013 at Lee Park in North Bay was part of the Summer in the Park.)	North Bay	Canada	Lee Park
Asia
7 August 2013	Quezon City	Philippines	Araneta Coliseum
10 August 2013	Osaka	Japan	Summer Sonic
11 August 2013	Tokyo	Japan	Summer Sonic
North America
16 August 2013	Louisville	United States	Kentucky State Fair
17 August 2013	Des Moines	United States	Iowa State Fair
18 August 2013	Apple Valley	United States	Minnesota Zoo Amphitheater
20 August 2013	Milwaukee	United States	Riverside Theatre
21 August 2013 (Note: The concert of 21 August 2013 at The Covelli Centre in Youngstown was originally scheduled to take place at the Jacobs Pavilion at Nautica.)	Youngstown	United States	Covelli Center
22 August 2013 (Note: The concert of 22 August 2013 at the Grace Hartman Amphitheatre at Bell Park in Greater Sudbury was part of the Sudbury SummerFest.)	Greater Sudbury	Canada	Grace Hartman Amphitheatre at Bell Park
24 August 2013	Syracuse	United States	New York State Fair
25 August 2013 (Note: The concert of 25 August 2013 at the Maryland State Fair Racetrack Infield in Timonium was part of the Maryland State Fair.)	Timonium	United States	Maryland State Fair Racetrack Infield
28 August 2013	Wolf Trap	United States	Filene Center
30 August 2013	Indianapolis	United States	Farm Bureau Insurance Lawn
12 September 2013	Phoenix	United States	Comerica Theatre
13 September 2013	San Diego	United States	Humphrey's Concerts by the Bay
14 September 2013	Las Vegas	United States	Pearl Concert Theater
15 September 2013	Los Angeles	United States	Greek Theatre
17 September 2013	Saratoga	United States	The Mountain Winery
18 September 2013	Davis	United States	Mondavi Center
20 September 2013	Puyallup	United States	Washington State Fair
10 October 2013 (Note: The concert of 10 October 2013 at the Essar Centre in Sault Ste. Marie was part of the Algoma Fall Festival.)	Sault Ste. Marie	Canada	Essar Centre
12 October 2013	Simcoe	Canada	Norfolk County Fair

== Box office score data ==
Venue	City	Tickets sold / available	Gross revenue
Greek Theatre	Los Angeles	3,615 / 5,852 (62%)	$93,362
Mondavi Center	Davis	443 / 1,500 (30%)	$19,849
TOTAL (for the 8 concerts listed)		4,058 / 7,352 (55%)	$113,211

== Cancelled shows ==
List of cancelled concerts, showing date, city, country, venue and reason for cancellation
Date	City	Country	Venue	Reason for cancellation
10 July 2013 (Note: The concert of 10 July 2013 at the Scotiabank Saddledome in Calgary was to be part of the Calgary Stampede.)	Calgary	Canada	Scotiabank Saddledome	2013 Alberta floods
