= Shooting Star (Owl City song) =

Single by Owl City

from the album The Midsummer Station
- Released: May 15, 2012
- Genre: Synth-pop
- Length: 4:07
- Label: Universal Republic
- Songwriters: Adam Young; Mikkel S. Eriksen; Tor Erik Hermansen; Matthew Thiessen; Dan Omelio
- Producers: Stargate; Adam Young

Owl City singles chronology
"Youtopia" (2011)	"Shooting Star" (2012)	"Good Time" (2012)

Music video
- "Shooting Star" on YouTube

"Shooting Star" is a song by American electronica project Owl City from his second extended play of the same name. The song premiered exclusively via Billboard on May 10, 2012, before it was released as the lead single from the EP on May 15, 2012. The song peaked at No. 176 on the UK Singles Chart and No. 49 on the Japan Hot 100. It was featured twice in the 2013 animated film Escape from Planet Earth.

== Background ==
Adam Young began to write "Shooting Star" in 2008 with Relient K's Matt Thiessen. The song was planned for inclusion on Owl City's Ocean Eyes album (2009), but it didn't make the cut. As work began on the album, The Midsummer Station (2012), Young brought a 90-second demo of the "old leftover instrumental idea" to Norwegian record producing and songwriting team Stargate, who helped complete the composition. Young recalled, "All the lyrics were basically written on the spot during those two days... and then I went back home to my own studio in Minnesota to cut the final (version). I think I tweaked some lyrics here and there to make everything feel better, and then the song was finished." "Shooting Star" was recorded in New York and was co-produced by the Stargate team.

The song was originally intended to be the lead single from The Midsummer Station, but the success of Carly Rae Jepsen's "Call Me Maybe" led to Owl City's management choosing the duet "Good Time" instead. An acoustic version of the song was also released in 2013, on Owl City's The Midsummer Station - Acoustic EP.

== Reception ==
Scott Fryberger of Jesus Freak Hideout wrote that the song is "still poppy and very accessible, and Owl City fans will probably feel mostly at home, but it has a bit more of a dance music vibe than the synthpop we're used to." Tris McCall of The Star-Ledger called the song "the least successful thing" on The Midsummer Station. McCall added that "while Young can discharge a self-affirmatory verse with the conviction of a choirboy, the song does skirt a bit too close to Katy Perry territory for comfort." Dave Lewis of Uproxx called the track a "danceable, extremely upbeat and positive pop anthem."

== Chart performance ==
"Shooting Star" debuted at No. 48 on the US Hot Christian Songs chart, before peaking at No. 36. It also reached No. 49 on the Japan Hot 100 chart, and No. 176 on the UK Singles Chart.

== Music video ==
On May 14, 2012, Owl City uploaded an official audio stream for "Shooting Star" to his YouTube channel. On May 17, a lyrics video for the song was released via Vevo. The video features a montage of twinkling stars, swirling beams of light, bright nebulas, and atmospheric clouds.

Young posted screen-shots of the upcoming video on his Twitter account for "Shooting Star" prior to its release. The MTV website includes an interview with Young about the filming of the video, who said, "It takes place in L.A. at night. There's people running. There's free runners. There's people doing flips like from building to building."

On October 25, 2012, Owl City uploaded the official music video for "Shooting Star" to his official YouTube channel. It was directed by Ethan Lader. The video's setting is nighttime in an urban area. The video features scenes of Young playing an electric piano under the street lights and people (who emit light from their chests) running, slowly gathering to all run together in the same direction. The video garnered 2 million views in less than 5 days.

== Use in media ==
This song is featured in the 2013 3D animated film, Escape from Planet Earth, twice.

It is also featured in the third trailer of Epic, and in the 2015 Nickelodeon TV show, Bella and the Bulldogs.

== Track listing ==
Digital download
No.	Title	Length
1.	"Shooting Star"	4:07

== Charts ==
=== Weekly charts ===
Weekly chart performance for "Shooting Star"
Chart (2012–13)	Peak position
Belgium (Ultratip Bubbling Under Flanders)	10
Belgium (Ultratip Bubbling Under Wallonia)	9
Canada (Nielsen Soundscan)	2
Japan (Japan Hot 100)	49
Mexico Ingles Airplay (Billboard)	38
South Korea International Chart (Circle)	21
UK Singles (Official Charts Company)	176
US Christian Songs (Billboard)	36
US Adult Top 40 (Billboard)	39

=== Year-end charts ===
2012 year-end chart performance for "Shooting Star"
Chart (2012)	Position
Japan Adult Contemporary (Billboard Japan)	59
US Christian CHR Songs (Billboard)	18

2013 year-end chart performance for "Shooting Star"
Chart (2013)	Position
UK Christian Songs (Cross Rhythms)	99

== Release history ==
Release dates and formats for "Shooting Star"
Region	Date	Format	Label	Ref.
Various	May 15, 2012	Digital download	Universal Republic Records	
United States	November 27, 2012	Contemporary hit radio	Universal Republic Records	
United Kingdom	December 10, 2012	Contemporary hit radio	Universal Republic Records	

== In popular culture ==
The song was used in a flash mob that happened during an ice hockey game on February 10, 2014, as part of an annual anti-bullying campaign in British Columbia.
