= Good Time (Owl City and Carly Rae Jepsen song) =

2012 single by Owl City and Carly Rae Jepsen

Single by Owl City and Carly Rae Jepsen

from the album The Midsummer Station and Kiss
- Released: June 26, 2012
- Recorded: 2011–2012
- Studio: Sky Harbor Studios, Owatonna, Minnesota; The Terrarium, Minneapolis, Minnesota; Signalpath Studios, Almonte, Ontario
- Genre: Dance-pop; electropop; Eurodance
- Length: 3:26
- Label: Republic; School Boy; 604; Interscope
- Songwriters: Adam Young; Matthew Thiessen; Brian Lee
- Producer: Adam Young

Owl City singles chronology
"Shooting Star" (2012)	"Good Time" (2012)	"Beautiful Times" (2014)

Carly Rae Jepsen singles chronology
"Curiosity" (2012)	"Good Time" (2012)	"This Kiss" (2012)

Music video
- "Good Time" on YouTube

Audio sample
- "Good Time": file; help

"Good Time" is a song by American electronica project Owl City and Canadian singer Carly Rae Jepsen. It was released on June 26, 2012, as the lead single from Owl City's fourth studio album The Midsummer Station (2012), through Republic Records. It was also used as the second single from Jepsen's second studio album, Kiss (2012), released through Schoolboy Records, 604 Records, and Interscope Records. "Good Time" was written by Matt Thiessen, Brian Lee, and Adam Young of Owl City, while production was handled by Young himself. The song was recorded from 2011 to 2012, at Sky Harbor Studios and The Terrarium, both based in Minnesota, and Signalpath Studios, based in Almonte, Ontario.

Upon its release, the song received generally positive reviews from music critics, being described as a "summer anthem". "Good Time" attained commercial success worldwide, reaching No. 1 in Canada, New Zealand, and South Korea, while peaking inside the top ten in twelve additional countries. It was also certified 5× Platinum in Australia, 3× Platinum in New Zealand, and 2× Platinum in the United States, Denmark, and Japan. It also won two Billboard Japan Music Awards, and was nominated for a NRJ Music Award. Its music video, directed by Declan Whitebloom, was released on the 24th of July, 2012, and won a Vevo Certified Award for surpassing 100,000,000 views. The success of the song broke the "one-hit wonder" label for both acts.

== Background and production ==
On June 14, 2012, Adam Young announced that he would be collaborating with Carly Rae Jepsen on a new song, projecting that it would be released on June 26, 2012. On June 20, Young pre-released the single "Good Time" via his SoundCloud account. On June 26, the song was officially released on iTunes. In 2013, an acoustic version of the song was released on Owl City's The Midsummer Station - Acoustic EP.

According to Young, the collaboration happened to be a "happy accident". He was searching for a female vocalist and his manager Steve Bursky, suggested Jepsen. Just before "Call Me Maybe' became a hit, he contacted her in February, after his manager forwarded him a link to her YouTube channel. Young "loved" her voice and decided to ask her for a collaboration. He also added: "It was this whole worlds-collide thing, and it was this kind of dream come true ... [She was] so kind to lend her talent to this song, so yeah, it worked out."

Jepsen recalled: "Actually [I found out about the track] through [my label head] Scooter Braun. He sort of played me the song in one of the first weeks I came down to L.A. to meet him. I heard it and I was just like, 'This is amazing. I would love to sing on this.'"

== Critical reception ==
Professional ratings
Review scores
Source	Rating
About.com	4/5 stars

The song has received positive reviews from critics, including Billboard: "It only makes sense that he's joined by Jepsen...[on] a track that could become a radio staple for the rest of the summer," and Entertainment Weekly: "'Good Time' goes down easier than a frozen margarita at a beachfront tiki bar." On his site The Re-View, British critic Nick Bassett referred to the song as "an uplifting, out and out pop duet which will most definitely ensure that neither artist has to settle for a 'one hit wonder' tag." Lewis Corner of Digital Spy stated that the track is an "addictively fizzy, sweet treat." Jocelyn Vena of MTV compared the song's lyrics to Katy Perry's, "Last Friday Night" and the Black Eyed Peas', "I Gotta Feeling" for its references to, "sleeping in their clothes after all that partying, staying up all night and generally pledging to have fun." Bill Lamb of About.com stated, "The pair are ultimately very charming and appealing together. It is quite possible they may have another chart-topping pop hit to follow up each of their #1 debut singles." However, he criticized the song by stating, "there is nothing that sounds original here."

Slate's Forrest Wickman also called it a "worthy successor" to "Call Me Maybe". He pointed to how "the song opens with a familiar story, and then subverts it, by removing anything that's not squeaky clean." Like Kesha in "TiK ToK," the singer begins the song waking up after a night of hard partying, in his clothes with a song by Prince inside his head. But in contrast, Wickman observes, he's "on the right side of the bed", not hung over, and ready to go out again the next evening. "When a children's choir is tossed in at the end, it's a bit gratuitous, but in this wholesome song why not," he concludes. "'Good Time' is a guilty pleasure, without the guilt." Rolling Stone called the song "mediocre dance pop". Chris Richards of The Washington Post noted that the song does not get good until Jepsen's verse. Barry Nicolson of NME wrote, "it's a long way down for docile Canadian Carly Rae Jepsen, whose follow-up is so nondescript I literally can't be bothered to describe it. The words 'Featuring Owl City' say more than a paragraph of adjectives ever could."

== Commercial performance ==
In the US, the song debuted at number 32 on the US Pop Songs chart and number 18 on the Billboard Hot 100 for the week dated July 11, reaching number eight a few weeks after. The song is the second (and, as of 2025, the most recent) to make the top ten on the chart for both artists; Owl City's first top ten single since "Fireflies", and Jepsen's second consecutive one after "Call Me Maybe." It had sold a million copies in the United States by August 29, 2012, and was certified double platinum by the RIAA. It sold 2,249,000 copies in the US by the end of 2012.

It peaked atop the charts in Canada and New Zealand, becoming Owl City's first number one single and Jepsen's second in both countries. The song debuted at number 17 on the UK Singles Chart on August 26, 2012. It rose to number five the following week, becoming Owl City's first top 5 UK hit since "Fireflies" reached number 1 in early 2010, and Jepsen's second top 5 UK single of 2012.

== Music video ==
=== Background ===
A teaser for the music video was released on June 20, 2012. The music video was directed by Declan Whitebloom and officially premiered via Vevo on July 24. Most of the video was shot at Silver Mine Lake in Harriman State Park in New York and the rest in New York City.

=== Synopsis ===
The music video begins with Jepsen waiting by her Fiat 500 in front of an apartment, when her friends then come out and join her. They then drive away from the haze of New York City. As they drive away, the video alternates between shots of Jepsen and Young with his own group in a Mercury Cougar as they drive down a forest road. They eventually meet up at a small cabin-like building and start drinking slushies. As Jepsen's verse starts, she is shown walking through the forest, with other shots of the rest of the group walking and coming to a campground. Once the hook and chorus begin, Young is seen by a lake, along with other shots of Jepsen and the rest of the group. As the sky darkens, they start dancing around a bonfire. The video concludes with shots of the group dancing and partying through the night.

== Live performances ==
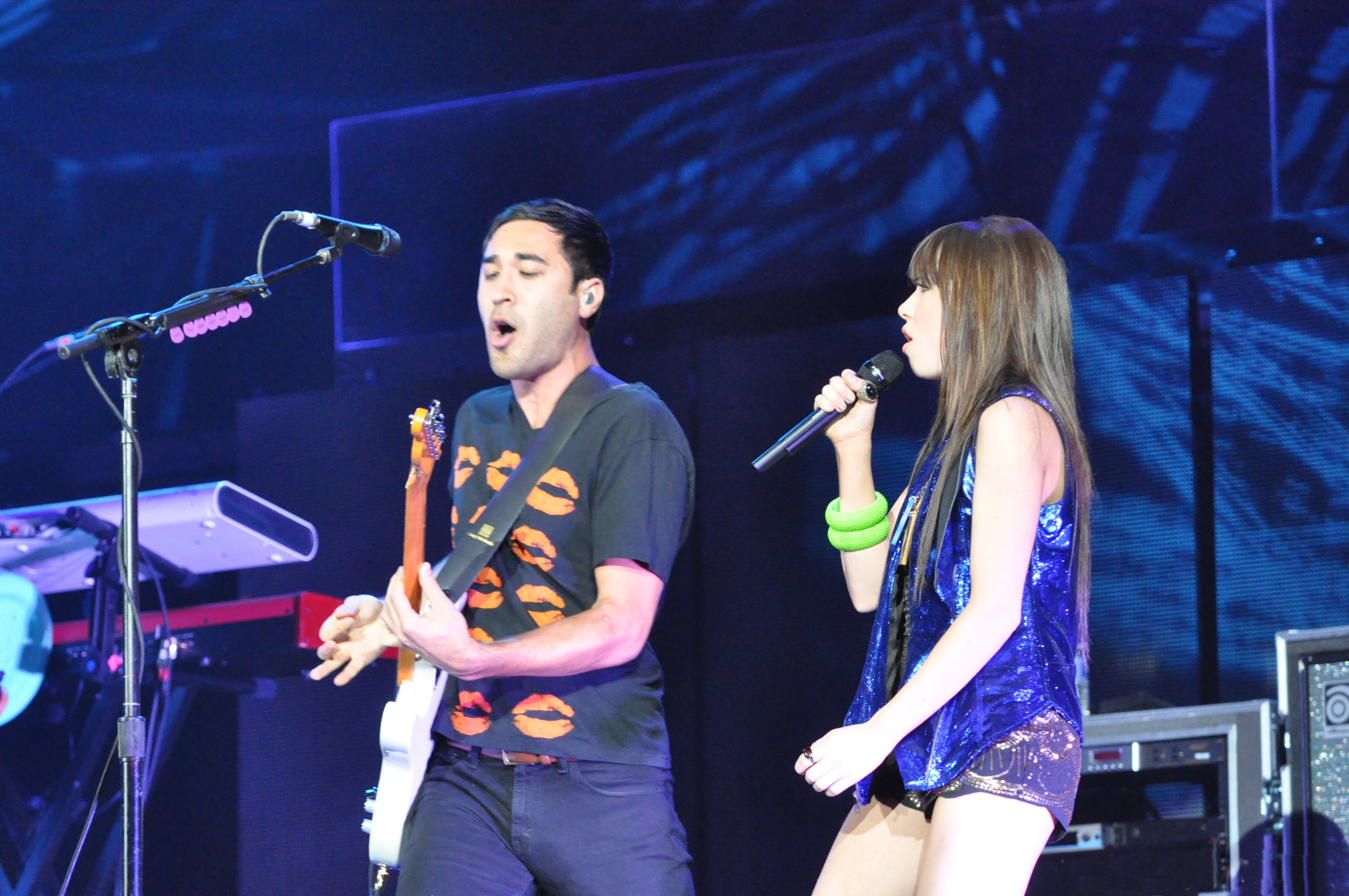
Jepsen and Jared Manierka performing "Good Time" during the Believe Tour in October 2012.

Owl City and Carly Rae Jepsen performed "Good Time" at America's Got Talent Wild Card results show on August 22, 2012, and the next day on Today. The duo also performed it in New York on August 25, 2012, during Arthur Ashe Kids' Day, an event that marks the start of the U.S. Open; The Tonight Show with Jay Leno on August 28, and Conan on August 29. Jepsen performed "Good Time" with Cody Simpson on Justin Bieber's Believe Tour (selected dates), and with Jared Manierka on her headlining The Summer Kiss Tour.

== Lawsuit ==
In October 2012, Alabama singer and songwriter Allyson Nichole Burnett filed a copyright infringement suit authored by attorney Neville Johnson in a California federal court against Jepsen and Young as well as several publishing companies and performing rights groups. She claimed that Young, Matt Thiessen and Brian Lee copied a prominent motif of her 2010 song, "Ah, It's a Love Song". The lawsuit noted several similarities between the two songs, including an identical pitch sequence (5-3-5-3-2), melodic contour (down, up, down, down), rhythmic construction (8th rest, 8th note, 8th note, 8th note, 8th note, 8th rest, quarter note), and timbre (textless vocals). Burnett also stated that she suffered "emotional and psychological damage" from fans asking why she copied the song.

In January 2014, Jepsen's music publishing company, BMI, reached an agreement with Burnett to place over $800,000 in royalties in an escrow account for the plaintiff's benefit. In return, Burnett agreed to drop her lawsuit. In June 2014, the suit was dropped, after an investigation revealed the song to be an original work. The royalties in escrow were returned to both, with Owl City receiving $525,901.77.

== Awards and nominations ==
Awards and nominations for "Good Time"
Year	Organization	Award	Result	Ref(s)
2012	Vevo Certified Awards	100,000,000 Views	Won	
2012	Billboard Japan Music Awards	Hot Top Airplay of the Year	Won	
2012	Billboard Japan Music Awards	Digital & Airplay Overseas of the Year	Won	
2012	NRJ Music Awards	International Group/Duo of the Year	Nominated	

== Track listing ==
- Digital download
1. "Good Time" – 3:26
- CD single
1. "Good Time" – 3:26
2. "Good Time" (Adam Young Remix) – 3:10
- UK digital remixes EP
1. "Good Time" – 3:26
2. "Good Time" (Adam Young Remix) – 3:10
3. "Good Time" (Fred Falke Full Remix) – 6:18
4. "Good Time" (Wideboys Club Remix) – 5:31

== Credits and personnel ==
=== Recording locations ===
Sources:

- Owl City's vocals recorded at Sky Harbor Studios, Owatonna, Minnesota, United States
- Carly Rae Jepsen's vocals recorded at Signalpath Studios, Almonte, Ontario, Canada
- The Minneapolis Youth Chorus's vocals recorded at The Terrarium, Minneapolis, Minnesota, United States

=== Personnel ===
Sources:

- Adam Young – songwriter, producer, recording, instruments, Minneapolis Youth Chorus vocal recording, vocals
- Matthew Thiessen – songwriter, background vocals
- Brian Lee – songwriter
- Ted Jensen – mastering
- Carly Rae Jepsen – vocals
- Robert Orton – mixing
- Minneapolis Youth Chorus – additional vocals
- Ryan Stewart – Carly Rae Jepsen vocal production
- Ken Friesen – Carly Rae Jepsen vocal recording

== Charts ==
=== Weekly charts ===
Weekly chart performance for "Good Time"
Chart (2012)	Peak position
Australia (ARIA)	5
Austria (Ö3 Austria Top 40)	9
Belgium (Ultratop 50 Flanders)	6
Belgium (Ultratop 50 Wallonia)	8
Canada Hot 100 (Billboard)	1
Canada AC (Billboard)	4
Canada CHR/Top 40 (Billboard)	3
Canada Hot AC (Billboard)	3
Czech Republic Airplay (ČNS IFPI)	3
Denmark (Tracklisten)	17
Euro Digital Song Sales (Billboard)	3
Finland (Suomen virallinen lista)	16
France (SNEP)	4
Germany (GfK)	11
Honduras (Honduras Top 50)	41
Hungary (Rádiós Top 40)	17
Ireland (IRMA)	6
Italy (FIMI)	27
Japan Hot 100 (Billboard)	2
Latvia (European Hit Radio)	4
Lebanon (The Official Lebanese Top 20)	4
Lithuania (European Hit Radio)	6
Luxembourg (Luxembourg Digital Songs)	2
Mexico (Billboard Ingles Airplay)	12
Netherlands (Dutch Top 40)	7
Netherlands (Single Top 100)	15
New Zealand (Recorded Music NZ)	1
Norway (VG-lista)	7
Scotland Singles (Official Charts)	3
Slovakia Airplay (ČNS IFPI)	48
South Africa (Mediaguide)	3
South Korea International Chart (Circle)	9
Sweden (Sverigetopplistan)	25
Switzerland (Schweizer Hitparade)	4
Taiwan (Hito Radio)	4
UK Singles (Official Charts)	5
UK Airplay (Music Week)	1
US Billboard Hot 100	8
US Adult Contemporary (Billboard)	12
US Adult Pop Airplay (Billboard)	7
US Hot Latin Songs (Billboard)	47
US Pop Airplay (Billboard)	4
Venezuela (Record Report)	88

=== Year-end charts ===
2012 year-end chart performance for "Good Time"
Chart (2012)	Position
Australia (ARIA)	16
Austria (Ö3 Austria Top 40)	67
Belgium (Ultratop 50 Flanders)	56
Belgium (Ultratop 50 Wallonia)	59
Brazil Airplay (Crowley)	90
Canada (Canadian Hot 100)	30
France (SNEP)	52
Germany (Media Control AG)	66
Japan (Japan Hot 100)	8
Japan Radio Songs (Billboard Japan)	1
Latvia (European Hit Radio)	40
Netherlands (Dutch Top 40)	27
Netherlands (Single Top 100)	68
New Zealand (Recorded Music NZ)	14
South Korea International Chart (GAON)	156
Switzerland (Schweizer Hitparade)	56
UK Singles (OCC)	69
US Billboard Hot 100	38
US Adult Top 40 (Billboard)	38
US Mainstream Top 40 (Billboard)	27

2013 year-end chart performance for "Good Time"
Chart (2013)	Position
Japan Adult Contemporary (Billboard Japan)	55
US Adult Contemporary (Billboard)	35

2014 year-end chart performance for "Good Time"
Chart (2014)	Position
Japan Adult Contemporary (Billboard Japan)	73

2015 year-end chart performance for "Good Time"
Chart (2015)	Position
Japan (Japan Hot 100)	88

2016 year-end chart performance for "Good Time"
Chart (2016)	Position
Japan (Japan Hot Overseas)	13

== Certifications and sales ==
Certifications and sales for "Good Time"
Region	Certification	Certified units/sales
Australia (ARIA)	5× Platinum	350,000^{‡}
Belgium (BRMA)	Gold	15,000^{*}
Brazil (Pro-Música Brasil)	Platinum	60,000^{‡}
Germany (BVMI)	Gold	150,000^{^}
Italy (FIMI)	Platinum	50,000^{‡}
Japan (RIAJ)	2× Platinum	500,000^{*}
New Zealand (RMNZ)	3× Platinum	90,000^{‡}
United Kingdom (BPI)	Platinum	600,000^{‡}
United States (RIAA)	2× Platinum	2,000,000
Streaming
Denmark (IFPI Danmark)	2× Platinum	3,600,000^{†}
Japan (RIAJ)	Platinum	100,000,000^{†}
^{*} Sales figures based on certification alone.^{^} Shipments figures based on certification alone.^{‡} Sales+streaming figures based on certification alone.^{†} Streaming-only figures based on certification alone.

== Release history ==
Release dates and formats for "Good Time"
Region	Date	Format	Label	Ref.
United States	June 26, 2012	Digital download	Republic Records	
Canada	June 26, 2012	Digital download	604 Records	
Australia	June 26, 2012	Digital download	Republic Records	
New Zealand	June 26, 2012	Digital download	Republic Records	
Europe	June 26, 2012	Digital download	Republic Records	
Brazil	June 26, 2012	Digital download	Republic Records	
Germany	July 20, 2012	Digital download	Republic Records	
France	July 20, 2012	Digital download	Republic Records	
Austria	August 3, 2012	CD	Republic Records	
Switzerland	August 3, 2012	CD	Republic Records	
United Kingdom	August 23, 2012	Digital download	Republic Records	
Taiwan	September 16, 2012	Digital download	Universal; Avex Group	

== See also ==
- List of Canadian Hot 100 number-one singles of 2012
- List of number-one singles from the 2010s (New Zealand)
- List of UK top-ten singles in 2012
