= The Midsummer Station – Acoustic =

EP by Owl City
- Released: July 30, 2013
- Studio: Sky Harbor Studios, Owatonna, Minnesota
- Genre: Acoustic; pop
- Length: 19:33
- Label: Universal Republic
- Producer: Adam Young

Owl City chronology
The Midsummer Station (2012)	The Midsummer Station – Acoustic (2013)	Ultraviolet (2014)

The Midsummer Station – Acoustic is an extended play by the American electronica project Owl City that was released on July 30, 2013. The EP reached number 99 on the Billboard 200 in the United States.

== Background ==
Owl City announced the release date of the EP via Twitter on July 3, 2013. The EP contains acoustic versions of "Good Time", "Gold" and "Shooting Star" from the fourth studio album, The Midsummer Station, as well as two previously unreleased tracks, "Hey Anna" and "I Hope You Think of Me".

== Reception ==
Professional ratings
Review scores
Source	Rating
Indie Vision Music	2/5 stars
Louder Than Music	3.5/5 stars

The Midsummer Station – Acoustic was generally met with positive reviews. Fred Thomas of AllMusic stated, "Though still employing electronic drums and a variety of non-acoustic instruments, the EP does offer stripped-down versions of three songs from the album, including laid-back alternate renditions of singles 'Shooting Star' and 'Good Time'." Jono Davies of Louder Than Music remarked, "What you get is two new songs and three different mixes of well known Owl City songs - some work, some don't - but what you do get is something the fans will love to have." Ian Zandi of Indie Vision Music gave a more negative review stating that the EP "should have never been made." He called the unreleased tracks "forgettable" and the acoustic songs, "not horrible" but "have no real reason to exist."

== Track listing ==
No.	Title	Length
1.	"Good Time" (acoustic)	3:35
2.	"Shooting Star" (acoustic)	4:31
3.	"Gold" (acoustic)	3:55
4.	"Hey Anna"	3:51
5.	"I Hope You Think of Me"	3:36
Total length:		19:33

== Charts ==
Chart performance for The Midsummer Station – Acoustic
Chart (2013)	Peak position
US Billboard 200	99
