= Dementia (song) =

Song by Owl City

from the album The Midsummer Station
- Released: May 10, 2012
- Studio: Rock the Mic Studios (New York City, NY)
- Genre: Punk rock; rock
- Length: 3:31
- Label: Universal Republic
- Songwriter: Adam Young
- Producer: Young

"Dementia" is a song by American electronica project Owl City from his second extended play Shooting Star and fourth studio album The Midsummer Station. The song features guest vocals from Mark Hoppus of Blink-182. The song premiered exclusively via Alternative Press on May 10, 2012.

The song is a punk rock track and has been met with positive reviews from music critics, most noting that Young sounds similar to Tom DeLonge and complimented its production.

== Background ==
On April 17, 2012, "Dementia" was leaked onto the internet, before the song officially premiered via Alternative Press on May 10, 2012. Young told his manager that he hoped to have Mark Hoppus on the track, who flew from London to New York to record the song in the studio. Young, who had been a fan of Blink-182 since he was a junior in high school, stated that working with Hoppus was a "privilege and an honor." Young also admitted he had learned a lot from Hoppus.

In an interview with AOL Music, Young stated that the song is about, "the consequences of wallowing in regret."

"It's a darker song about how everybody thinks of how life would be different now if you had made better choices in the past. If you let it, that can drive you crazy. If you don't let the past stay in the past, it'll be worse. It's hard to know in the moment how the choices I'm making right now will affect me later, but you can't really think about that. 'Dementia' is my way of saying let the past stay in the past. Don't let the 'What ifs' frequent your mind too much. Put that stuff to bed."

A remix to the song created by Adam Young was released in August 2012.

== Composition ==
"Dementia" was written and produced by Adam Young. The song is a Blink-182-inspired track and has been described as a rock track. Speaking about how the collaboration came together, Young stated, "Somehow my track made its way to his inbox and he liked it enough to come so we hung out in the studio and recorded his vocals and he's exactly the way I thought he would be."

== Reception ==
"Dementia" was generally met with positive reviews from music critics. Katie Hasty of Uproxx called the collaboration, "slightly out of each artist's usual arena," but described the song as a "high-energy track." Crystal Bell of the HuffPost stated, "the collaboration shouldn't come off as too much of a surprise since Owl City's Adam Young sounds quite a bit like a young Tom DeLonge." Jocelyn Vena of MTV stated that the song pays "homage to the vibe of Blink, with Young even sounding a bit like Tom DeLonge over the song's Travis Barker-like beat, jangly guitars and dreamy production."

== Personnel ==
Credits for "Dementia" adapted from the liner notes of The Midsummer Station.

Owl City

- Adam Young – vocals, keyboards, synthesizers, guitar, bass, drums, producer

Additional musicians

- Mark Hoppus – featured artist, additional vocals

Production

- Chris Lord-Alge – mixing
- Nik Karpen – assistant engineering
- Keith Armstrong – assistant engineering
- Brad Townsend – additional engineering
- Andrew Schubert – additional engineering

== Charts ==
Chart performance for "Dementia"
Chart (2012)	Peak position
South Korea International (GAON)	171
