= Kiss (Carly Rae Jepsen album) =

2012 studio album by Carly Rae Jepsen

- Standard cover (Note: The deluxe edition features a pink background used as the cover art for the album.)

Studio album by Carly Rae Jepsen
- Released: September 14, 2012
- Recorded: 2009–2012
- Studios: 2nd Floor; Bieler Bros.; Boiler Room; Darp; Focus; Hipposonic; Kite Productions; London Police Station; MXM; Pagzilla Sound Labs; Party Rock; Pulse Recording; Signalpath; Sky Harbor; NightBird Recording; The Terrarium; Triangle Sound West; Umbrella
- Genres: Dance-pop; nu-disco; teen pop
- Length: 42:31
- Labels: 604; School Boy; Interscope
- Producers: Josh Abraham; Klas Åhlund; Dallas Austin; Cory Enemy; Toby Gad; Jordan Gatsby; GoonRock; Kuk Harrell; Lukas Hilbert; Colin Janz; Matthew Koma; Max Martin; Mighty Mike; Oligee; Josh Ramsay; Redfoo; Ryan Stewart; Adam Young

Carly Rae Jepsen chronology
Curiosity (2012)	Kiss (2012)	Kiss: The Remix (2013)

Singles from Kiss
- 1. "Call Me Maybe" Released: September 20, 2011; 2. "Good Time" Released: June 26, 2012; 3. "This Kiss" Released: September 10, 2012; 4. "Tonight I'm Getting Over You" Released: January 21, 2013

Kiss is the second studio album by Canadian singer and songwriter Carly Rae Jepsen. It was released on September 14, 2012, by 604, Schoolboy, and Interscope Records. After her debut studio album, Tug of War (2008), Kiss became Jepsen's first internationally released album. Songs on the album are in the nu-disco, dance-pop, and teen pop genres, drawing inspiration from the Cars, Madonna and Robyn. Featuring production from a wide collection of producers including Dallas Austin, Josh Ramsay of Marianas Trench, GoonRock, Max Martin, Toby Gad and Redfoo of LMFAO, the album includes guest vocals from Justin Bieber and Owl City.

Kiss was generally positively reviewed by critics. Critics praised Jepsen for her vocal performance and songwriting, and complimented the album's upbeat production. However, some deemed it immature content for her age, which was 26 at the time. The album debuted at number six on the Billboard 200, selling over 46,000 copies in its opening week and debuted at five on the Canadian Albums Chart. It also charted in numerous international markets, including Europe, Australia, New Zealand, Japan, and the UK, and it has sold more than 1 million copies worldwide as of 2021. The album and its singles earned Jepsen two Grammy Award nominations including Song of the Year, as well as winning Album of the Year and Pop Album of the Year at the Juno Awards of 2013.

Four singles supported Kiss; a massive commercial success "Call Me Maybe" which reached number one in over 15 countries and sold more than 18 million copies worldwide, a collaboration with Owl City "Good Time" which peaked in the top ten of the Billboard Hot 100 alongside topping Jepsen's home chart of the Canadian Hot 100, "This Kiss" which reached top 40 in Canada, and "Tonight I'm Getting Over You". "Almost Said It" and "Picture" were also released as the album's two promotional singles.

The album was promoted with the Summer Kiss Tour, which ran from May 24 to October 12, 2013. She also participated as a supporting act for Justin Bieber's Believe Tour from 2012 to 2013, alongside Cody Simpson, Jaden Smith, The Wanted, and Owl City. She also promoted the album through various televised appearances. Kiss was accompanied with a Japan-exclusive remix album, entitled Kiss: The Remix, which was released on June 12, 2013.

== Production and recording ==
For the recording of Kiss, Jepsen had recorded at a multitude of recording studios: 2nd Floor Studios, Bieler Bros. Studios, Boiler Room, Darp Studios, Focus Studios, Hipposonic Studios, Kite Productions Studios, London Police Station, MXM Studios, Pagzilla Sound Labs, Party Rock Studio, Pulse Recording, Signalpath Studios, Sky Harbor Studios, Sunset Marquis Studio, The Terrarium, Triangle Sound Studios West, Umbrella Studios. The album's production was handled by Josh Abraham, Klas Åhlund of Teddybears, Dallas Austin, Cory Enemy, Toby Gad, Jordan Gatsby, GoonRock, Kuk Harrell, Lukas Loules (as Lukas Hilbert), Colin Janz, Matthew Koma, Max Martin, Mighty Mike, Oligee, Josh Ramsay of Marianas Trench, Redfoo of LMFAO, Ryan Stewart, and Adam Young. Kiss features guest appearances for Young (under the Owl City name) and fellow Canadian singer Justin Bieber.

Musical styles of Kiss's songs have been described as nu-disco, dance-pop, and teen pop.

== Promotion ==
=== Marketing ===
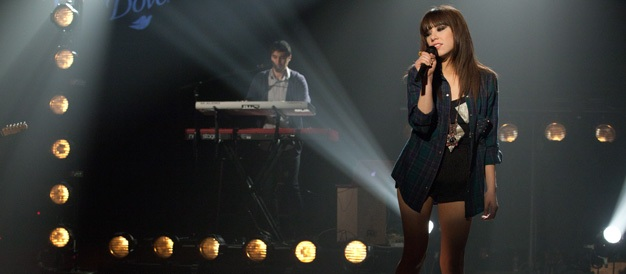
Jepsen at the Walmart Soundcheck in 2012, where she performed several songs from Kiss

To promote Kiss, Jepsen performed "Call Me Maybe" at the 2012 Billboard Music Awards on May 20, the 2012 MuchMusic Video Awards on June 17, the 2012 Teen Choice Awards on July 22, and the 2012 MTV Europe Music Awards on November 11. Alongside Owl City, the Canadian chanteuse sang their collaborative single, "Good Time", on America's Got Talent on August 22, Today on August 23, at the US Open's Arthur Ashe Kids' Day on August 25, The Tonight Show with Jay Leno on August 28, and Conan on August 29.

On the drop-date of Kiss, "This Kiss" and "Call Me Maybe" were performed on The Ellen DeGeneres Show. Additional performances of "This Kiss" were held at So You Think You Can Dance on September 18, 90210's episode "Till Death Do Us Part" on October 8, and Late Show with David Letterman on October 25. Jepsen performed "This Kiss", "Your Heart Is a Muscle", "Guitar String / Wedding Ring" and "Call Me Maybe" at the Walmart Soundcheck on September 26. Jepsen performed "This Kiss" and "Call Me Maybe" at American Music Awards of 2012 on November 18. Jepsen performed "This Kiss" and Call Me Maybe" at the halftime show during 100th Grey Cup on November 25. On December 2, Jepsen performed at The Big Jingle 2012.

Jepsen performed "Call Me Maybe" and "Tonight I'm Getting Over You" at NRJ Music Awards of 2012 on January 26, 2013. Jepsen performed "Sweetie" on the Shake It Up episode "Fair Librarian It Up", which aired on February 24, 2013.

=== Singles and other songs ===
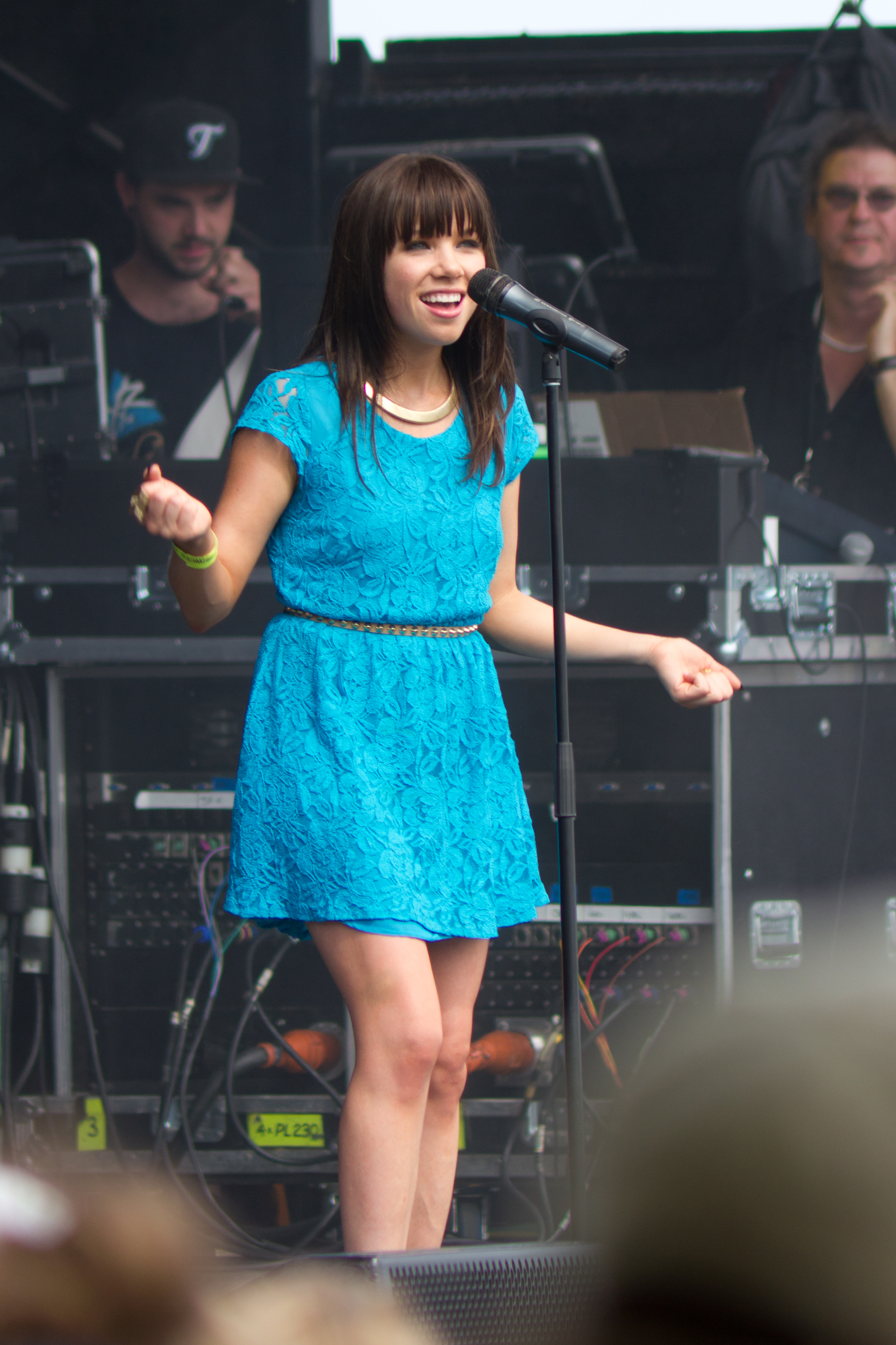
Jepsen performing at the 2012 Burlington's Sound of Music Festival

Released as the lead single of Kiss on September 20, 2011, in Canada and internationally on February 22, 2012, "Call Me Maybe" was a massive international success, peaking at number one in 15 countries including Canada and the United States. After reaching the top position in Canada, Jepsen became the fifth Canadian artist to do so in her home country since 2007. In the United States, "Call Me Maybe" reached number one on the Billboard Hot 100, becoming the first number one by a Canadian female artist on the chart since Avril Lavigne's 2007 single "Girlfriend". It gained over 1.8 billion streams on Spotify and sold more than 18 million copies worldwide. Its music video was written and directed by Ben Knechtel, and it received three nominations on the 2012 MuchMusic Video Awards in the categories of UR Fave Video, Pop Video of the Year, and Video of the Year.

The second single from Kiss, "Good Time" featuring Owl City, was released on June 26, 2012. In the United States, it reached at number 8 on the Hot 100, becoming the second to make the top ten on the chart for both artists; Owl City's first top ten single since "Fireflies" and Jepsen's first top-ten single since "Call Me Maybe". It also made Jepsen one of the few artists in history to have two top ten songs in the same week. "Good Time" has sold 2,249,000 copies by the end of 2012 in the United States alone, being certified double platinum in that territory. In Canada and New Zealand, it peaked at number one, becoming Owl City's first number-one single and Jepsen's second in both countries. The song also peaked at number five on the UK Singles Chart. The music video directed by Declan Whitebloom was released on July 24, 2012, which features both Jepsen and Adam Young. It was filmed in Harriman State Park's Silvermine Picnic Area.

The third single, "This Kiss", was released on September 10, 2012. It peaked at number 86 on the Hot 100 and number 23 on the Canadian Hot 100, being the sixth top 40 hit in Canada. Kiss's fourth single was "Tonight I'm Getting Over You", released on January 21, 2013. Jepsen debuted the song at the 2013 NRJ Music Awards, where she also performed it along with "Call Me Maybe". On January 27, she posted on her Facebook account that she shot the music video in Los Angeles.

"Almost Said It" was released exclusively on the Canadian iTunes Store as the first promotional single on December 4, 2012. The track "Beautiful" (featuring Justin Bieber) reached number 87 on the Hot 100 and 37 in Canada, becoming Jepsen's seventh top 40 hit and Bieber's twenty-second top 40 hit in Canada.

=== Tour ===
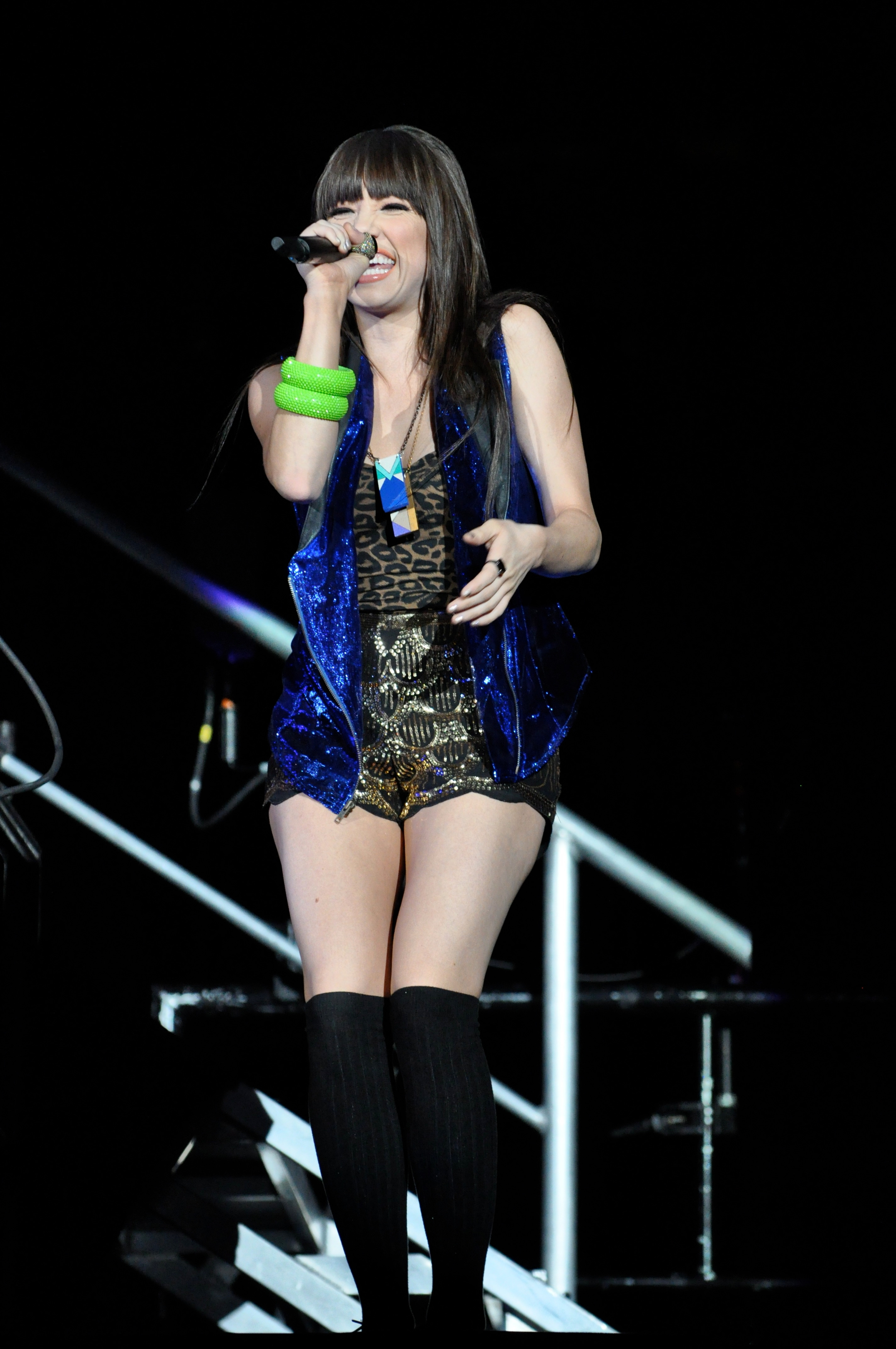
Jepsen at the Believe Tour on October 20, 2012, in Minneapolis

Jepsen promoted Kiss when opening for Justin Bieber during his Believe Tour in North America, Europe, and South America dates. During the tour, Jepsen performed "Sweetie", "Tiny Little Bows", "Good Time" with Cody Simpson, "Tonight I'm Getting Over You", "Curiosity", "This Kiss", "Your Heart Is a Muscle", "Hurt So Good", "Call Me Maybe", and "Beautiful" with Bieber. She further promoted Kiss with her first solo concert tour, the Summer Kiss Tour, which took place in the summer of 2013, from May 27 through October 12, 2013; it began in Jakarta, Indonesia, and ended in Simcoe, Canada.

== Critical reception ==
Professional ratings
Aggregate scores
Source	Rating
AnyDecentMusic?	5.6/10
Metacritic	63/100
Review scores
Source	Rating
AllMusic	4/5 stars
Billboard	4/5 stars
Daily News	2/5 stars
Entertainment Weekly	B−
The Guardian	2/5 stars
Los Angeles Times	3/4 stars
Now	4/5
Rolling Stone	2.5/5 stars
Slant Magazine	2.5/5 stars
USA Today	3/4 stars

Kiss received generally positive reviews from music critics with an aggregated metascore of 63 of 100 in Metacritic based on 13 reviews.

Heather Phares of AllMusic said: "After a string of fantastical glamazon pop stars like Rihanna, Lady Gaga, and Nicki Minaj, there's something to be said for Jepsen's girl-next-door persona, which helps make Kiss one of 2012's best, and sweetest, pop albums." AllMusic also named Kiss as one of its top 10 albums of 2012 citing its "solid songwriting and fizzy melodies to prove her success [with 2012-defining single 'Call Me Maybe'] wasn't a fluke." Adam Markovitz of Entertainment Weekly noted that the album "makes a mad dash for good-enoughness". Mikael Wood of Los Angeles Times evoked how the album "...feels like a successful attempt to invest pheromone-rush dance pop with a bit of old-soul wisdom." Benjamin Boles of Now proclaimed the album for containing "...two just okay songs and 14 great ones is better than most acts can manage on their greatest hits packages, let alone their second album." Evan Sawdey of PopMatters surmised: "Kiss will not be looked at as one of the all-time great pop albums. Yet song-for-song, Jepsen proves she has more talent than half of the stars out there, managing to not only sell virtually every word on the album but also managing to make it all sound off-the-cuff and effortless, ultimately creating a bubbly pop playground that is both catchy and endearing without having to turn base or crude to get there...If she keeps putting out quality material like virtually all of Kiss, that thankfully will not be the only thing that defines her." Ben Rayner of the Toronto Star complimented it for being "...almost as insidiously easy on the ears", but also criticised its use of the "Call Me Maybe" template: "It's all so bright and immediate and perfectly pleasurable, though, that you don't really realize that you've essentially just listened to the same tune eight times in a row". Rayner ended the review by saying: "Get over the guilt and give in to the pleasure." Brian Mansfield of USA Today said that Carly Rae Jepsen "doesn't always lay herself open the way she does in Call Me Maybe. Much of her album is prefab dance-pop." To this, Mansfield wrote that "There's not another hit like 'Call Me Maybe'. But there's enough substance to ensure she's more than a one-hit wonder."

However, some critics gave Kiss less positive reviews. Jim Farber of the Daily News wrote: "No doubt Jepsen's handlers know this, but they didn't feel they could risk switching things up. Instead, they confined her more than ever, tethering her to a role that renders Kiss this year's most redundant disc." Caroline Sullivan of The Guardian stated: "On this album, her voice is still her Achilles' heel; she's a 26-year-old who sounds 16, and a colourless 16 at that." Sullivan however noted that she liked "Beautiful" the most, which she called a "faux-folk ballad" and "a sweet duet with Justin Bieber [...] that suggests that neither artist is completely irredeemable". Blair Kelly of MusicOMH criticised the album as "a huge disappointment. It could have been a real gem for fans of guilty pleasure pop, but even Taylor Swift comes across as dark and edgy compared to the squeak of this overproduced laziness. Perhaps the global impact of the massive 'Call Me Maybe' is what makes the album as a whole feel like a damp squib, but with or without US Marine parody videos, the rest of the album fizzles out into synth-pop oblivion." Jon Dolan of Rolling Stone said: "... Kiss too often defaults to mediocre dance pop like the Owl City collaboration 'Good Time' – heavy on Disney-fied thump, light on memorable hooks that might highlight her unassuming adorableness." Despite noting Jepsen for "her simplicity and directness", Yorgo Douramacos of Slant Magazine felt "The fact that it's often expressed in seemingly direct, if dramatically overstated, elements should deceive no one. These are mythically complex creatures. Don't believe me? Ask a teenage boy."

In the years since Kiss's release, various publications like Time, MTV, Stereogum, and Billboard have labelled the album as underrated. The album was voted as the 10th best album of 2012 by AllMusic. Oricon in Japan ranked the album at number 63 for the year 2013.

== Commercial performance ==
=== Anglosphere ===
In Canada, Kiss debuted at five on the Canadian Albums Chart, selling over 8,000 copies in its first week. It was later certified Gold by Music Canada (MC) for equivalent sales of 10,000 units in the country. In the United Kingdom, the album debuted at number nine on the UK Albums Chart. As of September 2015, the album has sold a total 46,067 copies in the UK. In the United States, Kiss debuted at number six on the Billboard 200 chart, selling 46,000 copies in its first week. In the second week, it dropped to number 20 on the chart, selling an additional 19,000 copies. As of August 2015, the album has sold 292,000 copies in the country.

In Australia, Kiss charted at number 8 on the ARIA Charts and was certified Gold by the Australian Recording Industry Association (ARIA) for equivalent sales of 35,000 units in the country. In New Zealand, it charted at number 6 on the New Zealand Albums Chart and was certified 2x Platinum by Recorded Music New Zealand (RMNZ) for equivalent sales of 30,000 units in the country.

=== Other countries ===
In Austria, Kiss charted at number 25 on the Ö3 Austria Top 40 chart and was certified Gold by IFPI Austria for equivalent sales of 10,000 units in the country. In Belgium, it charted at number 27 on the Ultratop chart in Wallonia and peaked at number 15 on the same chart in Flanders. In Brazil, although the album did not chart, it did sell 20,000 certified units in the country. In Denmark, Kiss charted at number 26 on Hitlisten's Danish Albums Chart. In the Netherlands, the album charted at number 47 on the Dutch Album Top 100 chart. In France, the album charted at number 14 on the French Albums Chart. By the end of the year, the album was positioned at number 115 on the chart.

In Germany, Kiss charted at number 22 on the Offizielle Top 100 chart. In Ireland, the album charted at number 16 on the Irish Albums Chart. In Italy, the album charted at number 31 on the Italian Albums Chart. In Japan, the album debuted at number four with 29,528 copies sold in its first week. In the second week, the album dropped to number six on the chart, selling 19,022 more copies. The album was eventually certified Platinum by the Recording Industry Association of Japan (RIAJ) for equivalent sales of 250,000 units in the country. In Mexico, Kiss charted at number 16 on the Top 100 Mexico chart. In Norway, the album charted at number 24 on VG-lista's Norwegian Albums Chart. In Poland, although the album did not chart, it was certified Gold by the Polish Society of the Phonographic Industry (ZPAV) for equivalent sales of 10,000 units in the country.

In Singapore, although it did not chart, Kiss was certified Gold by Recording Industry Association Singapore (RIAS) for equivalent sales of 5,000 units in the country. In Spain, the album charted at number 20 on the Productores de Música de España's (PROMUSICAE) Spanish Albums chart. In Sweden, although the album did not chart, it was certified Gold by Grammofon Leverantörernas Förening (GLF) for equivalent sales of 20,000 units in the country. In Switzerland, the album charted at number 18 on the Schweizer Hitparade.

== Track listing ==
Standard edition
No.	Title	Writer(s)	Producer(s)	Length
1.	"Tiny Little Bows"	Carly Rae Jepsen; Dallas Austin; Tavish Crowe; Sam Cooke	Austin; Cory Enemy; Colin Janz^{[a]}	3:22
2.	"This Kiss"	Jepsen; Matthew Koma; S.K. Gordy; Kelly Covell	Redfoo; Koma	3:49
3.	"Call Me Maybe"	Jepsen; Josh Ramsay; Crowe	Ramsay	3:13
4.	"Curiosity" (new mix)	Jepsen; Ryan Stewart	Austin; Enemy; Stewart^{[b]}^{[c]}; Mighty Mike^{[b]}	3:33
5.	"Good Time" (with Owl City)	Adam Young; Matthew Thiessen; Brian Lee	Young; Stewart^{[c]}	3:25
6.	"More than a Memory"	Jepsen; Koma; Gordy	Koma	4:02
7.	"Turn Me Up"	Jepsen; Bonnie McKee; Josh Abraham; Oliver Goldstein; Kevin Maher	Abraham; Oligee; Enemy^{[b]}	3:44
8.	"Hurt So Good"	Jepsen; Koma	Koma	3:09
9.	"Beautiful" (duet with Justin Bieber)	Toby Gad; Bieber; Alex Lambert	Gad; Kuk Harrell^{[c]}	3:18
10.	"Tonight I'm Getting Over You"	Jepsen; Lukas Hilbert; Max Martin; Clarence Coffee Jr.; Shiloh; Katerina Loules	Martin; Hilbert	3:39
11.	"Guitar String / Wedding Ring"	Jepsen; Ramsay; Crowe	Ramsay	3:27
12.	"Your Heart Is a Muscle"	Jepsen; Gad	Gad	3:50
Total length:				42:31

International edition
No.	Title	Writer(s)	Producer(s)	Length
13.	"I Know You Have a Girlfriend"	Jepsen; Koma	Koma	3:03
Total length:				45:34

United States deluxe edition
No.	Title	Writer(s)	Producer(s)	Length
13.	"Drive"	Jepsen; Austin; Michael McGarity; Jaden Michaels; Crowe	Austin; Mighty Mike; Enemy^{[b]}	2:59
14.	"Wrong Feels So Right"	Jepsen; David Listenbee; Francesca Richard; Jordan Orvosh; Gordy; Andre Smith; Crowe	GoonRock; Redfoo^{[b]}; Jordan Gatsby^{[b]}; Koma^{[c]}	4:18
15.	"Sweetie"	Jepsen; Klas Åhlund; Jack Antonoff; Sara Quin	Åhlund; Koma^{[c]}	3:38
Total length:				53:26

=== Notes ===
- ^{^[a]} – additional production
- ^{^[b]} – co-production
- ^{^[c]} – vocal production
- "Tiny Little Bows" contains an interpolation of "Cupid", written by Sam Cooke.
- United States and Canadian iTunes Store deluxe edition features "Almost Said It" as a bonus track.
- Canadian, US Target, and Argentinean edition feature "I Know You Have a Girlfriend" as a bonus track.
- International Spotify deluxe edition features "Picture" as a bonus track, while international iTunes Store deluxe edition features "Almost Said It".
- Japanese edition features "Melt with You" as a bonus track.
- Japanese tour edition features "Picture", "Call Me Maybe" (10 Kings vs Ollie Green remix), "Ramsay", "Good Time" (with Owl City; Adam Young remix), "This Kiss" (Brass Knuckles remix).
- Japanese limited edition bonus DVD features a music video and behind the scenes of "Call Me Maybe" and "Good Time" with Owl City. Japanese tour edition bonus DVD additionally features those of "This Kiss".

== Personnel ==
Credits were adapted from AllMusic.

=== Musicians ===
- Lead vocals – Carly Rae Jepsen
- Guest vocals – Justin Bieber, Owl City
- Background vocals – Colin Janz, Kelsey Janz, The Minneapolis Youth Chorus, Josh Ramsay, Matthew Thiessen
- Keyboards – Lukas Hilbert, Max Martin
- Guitar – Tavish Crowe

=== Production ===
- Executive producers: Justin Bieber, Scott "Scooter" Braun and Jonathan Simkin
- Vocal producers: Ryan Stewart and Kuk Harrell
- Vocal editing: Jon Rezin,
- Mastering: Gene Grimaldi
- Engineers: Josh Gudwin, Michael Ilbert, Matthew Koma, Josh Ramsay, Ryan Shanahan, Rick Sheppard, Patrick Collier, Sean Walsh, Ryan Williams and Adam Young
- Assistant engineers: Matt LaPlant and Brandon N. Caddell
- Mixing: Serban Ghenea, Toby Gad, John Hanes, Josh Gudwin, Dave Ogilvie, Rob Orton, Robert Orton and RedFoo
- Assistant mixing: Zach Blackstone, Pedro Dzelme, Miguel Lara, Tim Roberts and Phil Seaford
- Programming: Rick Sheppard, Cory Enemy, Toby Gad, Lukas Hilbert, Colin Janz, Max Martin and Rick Sheppard
- Instrumentation: Josh Ramsay, Adam Young and Toby Gad
- Photography: Reid Rolls and Damien Fry
- Art direction and design: Gavin Taylor

== Charts ==
=== Weekly charts ===
Weekly chart performance
Chart (2012)	Peak position
Australian Albums (ARIA)	8
Austrian Albums (Ö3 Austria)	25
Belgian Albums (Ultratop Flanders)	15
Belgian Albums (Ultratop Wallonia)	27
Canadian Albums (Billboard)	5
Danish Albums (Hitlisten)	26
Dutch Albums (Album Top 100)	47
French Albums (SNEP)	14
German Albums (Offizielle Top 100)	22
Irish Albums (IRMA)	16
Italian Albums (FIMI)	31
Japanese Albums (Oricon)	4
Mexican Albums (Top 100 Mexico)	16
New Zealand Albums (RMNZ)	6
Norwegian Albums (VG-lista)	24
Scottish Albums (Official Charts)	7
Spanish Albums (Promusicae)	20
Swiss Albums (Schweizer Hitparade)	18
UK Albums (Official Charts)	9
US Billboard 200	6

=== Year-end charts ===
Year-end chart performance
Chart (2012)	Position
French Albums (SNEP)	115

== Certifications ==
Certifications and sales
Region	Certification	Certified units/sales
Australia (ARIA)	Gold	35,000^{^}
Austria (IFPI Austria)	Gold	10,000^{*}
Brazil	—	20,000
Canada (Music Canada)	Gold	40,000^{^}
Japan (RIAJ)	Platinum	250,000^{^}
New Zealand (RMNZ)	2× Platinum	30,000^{‡}
Poland (ZPAV)	Gold	10,000^{*}
Singapore (RIAS)	Gold	5,000^{*}
Sweden (GLF)	Gold	20,000^{‡}
United Kingdom (BPI)	Silver	60,000^{‡}
^{*} Sales figures based on certification alone.^{^} Shipments figures based on certification alone.^{‡} Sales+streaming figures based on certification alone.

== Release history ==
Release dates and formats
Region	Date	Format(s)	Edition(s)	Label	Ref.
Australia	September 14, 2012	CD; digital download	Standard	Universal	
Germany	September 14, 2012	CD; digital download	Standard	Universal	
France	September 17, 2012	CD; digital download	Deluxe	Polydor	
United Kingdom	September 17, 2012	CD; digital download	Deluxe	Polydor	
Canada	September 18, 2012	CD; digital download	Standard; deluxe	604	
United States	September 18, 2012	CD; digital download	Standard; deluxe	Interscope	
Argentina	September 18, 2012	CD; digital download	Standard; deluxe	Universal Music Argentina	
Japan	September 19, 2012	CD+DVD; digital download	Standard	Universal Music Japan	
Japan	January 30, 2013	CD+DVD; digital download	Tour	Universal Music Japan	

== Kiss: The Remix ==
Kiss: The Remix

Remix album by Carly Rae Jepsen
- Released: June 12, 2013
- Length: 65:10
- Labels: 604; Schoolboy; Interscope

Carly Rae Jepsen chronology
Kiss (2012)	Kiss: The Remix (2013)	Emotion (2015)

A remix album, titled Kiss: The Remix, was released exclusively in Japan on June 12, 2013, through 604, Schoolboy, and Interscope Records. It features contributions from 10 Kings, Ollie Green, Coyote Kisses, Fred Falke, Lenno, Wideboys, Digital Dog, Jason Nevins, Mathieu Bouthier, Twice as Nice, Reid Stefan, and KoKo Club. Upon its release, Kiss: The Remix charted at number 157 on Oricon's Japanese Albums chart.

=== Track listing ===
Kiss: The Remix track listing
No.	Title	Type	Length
1.	"Call Me Maybe"	Almighty radio edit	4:07
2.	"Call Me Maybe"	10 Kings vs Ollie Green remix	3:09
3.	"Call Me Maybe"	Coyote Kisses remix	4:47
4.	"Good Time" (with Owl City)	Fred Falke mix	6:08
5.	"Good Time" (with Owl City)	Lenno remix	4:56
6.	"Good Time" (with Owl City)	Wideboys club remix	5:31
7.	"This Kiss"	Digital Dog radio edit	4:14
8.	"This Kiss"	Jason Nevins remix	4:12
9.	"This Kiss"	Mathieu Bouthier remix	6:45
10.	"Tonight I'm Getting Over You"	Twice As Nice remix	3:41
11.	"Tonight I'm Getting Over You"	Reid Stefan remix	6:07
12.	"Tonight I'm Getting Over You"	KoKo Club mix	4:53
13.	"Call Me Maybe"	Instrumental	3:14
14.	"Good Time"	Instrumental	3:26
Total length:			65:10

=== Charts ===
Weekly chart performance
Chart (2013)	Peak position
Japanese Albums (Oricon)	157
