= Tonight I'm Getting Over You =

Single by Carly Rae Jepsen

from the album Kiss
- Released: January 21, 2013
- Recorded: 2012
- Genre: Electro house
- Length: 3:39
- Label: 604; School Boy; Interscope
- Songwriters: Carly Rae Jepsen; Lukas Hilbert; Max Martin; Clarence Coffee Jr.; Shiloh; Katerina Loules
- Producers: Max Martin; Lukas Hilbert

Carly Rae Jepsen singles chronology
"This Kiss" (2012)	"Tonight I'm Getting Over You" (2013)	"Take a Picture" (2013)

Music video
- "Tonight I'm Getting Over You" on YouTube

"Tonight I'm Getting Over You" is a song by Canadian singer Carly Rae Jepsen, taken from her second studio album and debut international release, Kiss (2012). It was released in the United States as a single on February 19, 2013, as the international fourth single from the album. An official remix featuring rapper Nicki Minaj was released on May 6, 2013. The song was written by Jepsen, Lukas Hilbert, Max Martin, Clarence Coffee Jr., Shiloh, and Katerina Loules. Thematically, the track centers around a break-up, with lyrics about getting over her ex-boyfriend by dancing with someone new. The song has some dubstep aspects. "Tonight I'm Getting Over You" received mostly positive reviews from music critics; some deemed it one of the best tracks on Kiss, as they did with "Call Me Maybe".

Charting across Europe, the song became a top ten hit in Belgium. The song peaked at number 90 on the Billboard Hot 100 and achieved modest success on the Mainstream Top 40 and dance club airplay charts.

== Background and composition ==
"Tonight I'm Getting Over You" (2013)
A 19-second sample of the chorus, where the instrumentation incorporates a LMFAO-style beat and we hear Jepsen repetitively chanting, "Tonight I'm getting over you".

"Tonight I'm Getting Over You" was written by Jepsen, Lukas Hilbert, Max Martin, Clarence Coffee Jr, Shiloh, and Katerina Loules. The song is primarily electro house, Jepsen's vocal spans to high note F5 and opens with her singing, "I wanna smash your fears and get drunken off your tears / Don't you share your smile with anyone else but me". Jepsen addresses her post-breakup feelings, as she gets tired of her boyfriend's lies and broken promises: "I wanna touch your heart, I wanna crush it in my hands / Make you plead and cry as you give up all the lies". Sam Lansky of Idolator wrote that "the tremor in Jepsen's voice in the pre-chorus one of the year's most heartbreaking pop moments". As she closes the pre-chorus singing, "No more crying to get me through / I'll keep dancing till the morning with somebody new", the instrumentation incorporates a LMFAO-style beat as we hear Jepsen repetitively chanting, "Tonight I'm getting over you". According to Candy, the song's message is one of trying to get over a lover, but eventually getting back with them. Of the lyrics, Jepsen told People: "I think it's important to have a bit of a connection to a song that you sing, and there's going to be some grittiness behind it, because otherwise it doesn't come across as sincere. So I do think I tap into those memories in a certain way, but it doesn't make me feel sad. It just makes me feel a little contemplative and in the moment." Jepsen herself spoke out about the song's theme, saying that despite the highs and lows of a relationship, sometimes it's better to move on. Neglecting to reveal the identity of the man who inspired the lyrics, she said, "it's probably better he didn't know it was about him." The official remix of "Tonight I'm Getting Over You" features a rap verse from Nicki Minaj; over a dubstep beat, Minaj raps: "Tonight I'm getting over / Meditating through my yog-er."

== Critical reception ==
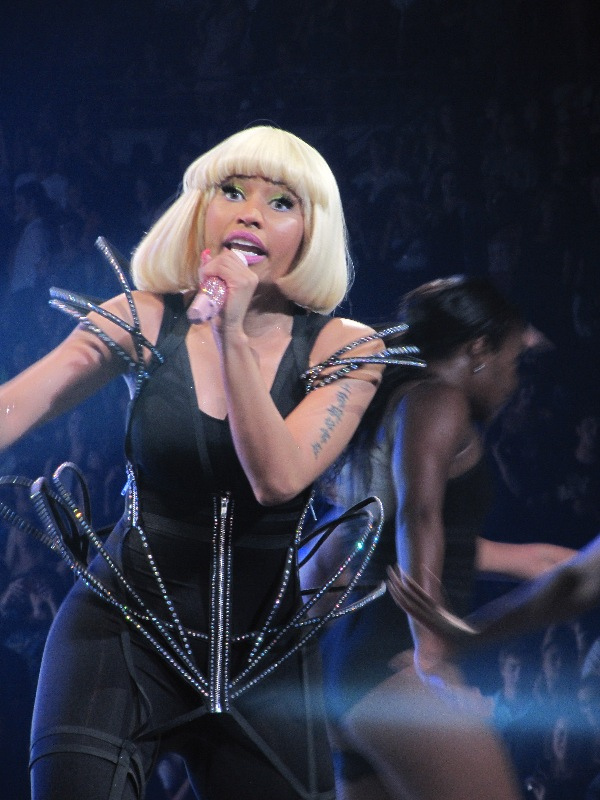
Nicki Minaj was featured on the official remix of "Tonight I'm Getting Over You".

"Tonight I'm Getting Over You" received mostly positive reviews from music critics. Jessica Sager of Pop Crush wrote that, if released as a single, the song would likely become a "club staple". Billboard Sam Lansky of Idolator praised the chorus, where he noted the song's transformation from "a 'Give Your Heart a Break'-esque Top 40 lollipop into a noisy, crunchy rave-a-thon." Melinda Newman of Hitfix thought "Tonight I'm Getting Over You" was as risque as Jepsen's previous single, "This Kiss". Adam Markovitz of Entertainment Weekly selected "Tonight I'm Getting Over You" and "Call Me Maybe" as the best songs on Kiss. A negative review came from Carolline Sullivan of The Guardian, who wrote that "set against Dallas Austin and Max Martin's overprocessed beats, [the singer] can't help but fail, as Canadian Idol would put it, to 'own' the songs." Candy wrote that while the theme of Jepsen's new single changed with "Tonight I'm Getting Over You", the upbeat tempo remains, making the track a bona fide party anthem. Music reviewer Sam Lansky noted that the success of "Call Me Maybe" would leave "Tonight I'm Getting Over You" without much mainstream recognition, calling it the "scientifically-engineered-to-be-perfect pop song". Commenting on the Nicki Minaj remix, Jeff Benjamin of Fuse said that while the rapper's addition was silly, it had the potential to rescue Jepsen from becoming a one-hit wonder.

== Chart performance ==
The song remix version with Nicki Minaj debuted on the Billboard Hot 100 chart of May 25, 2013, at number 90, before falling off the chart the following week.

== Promotion ==
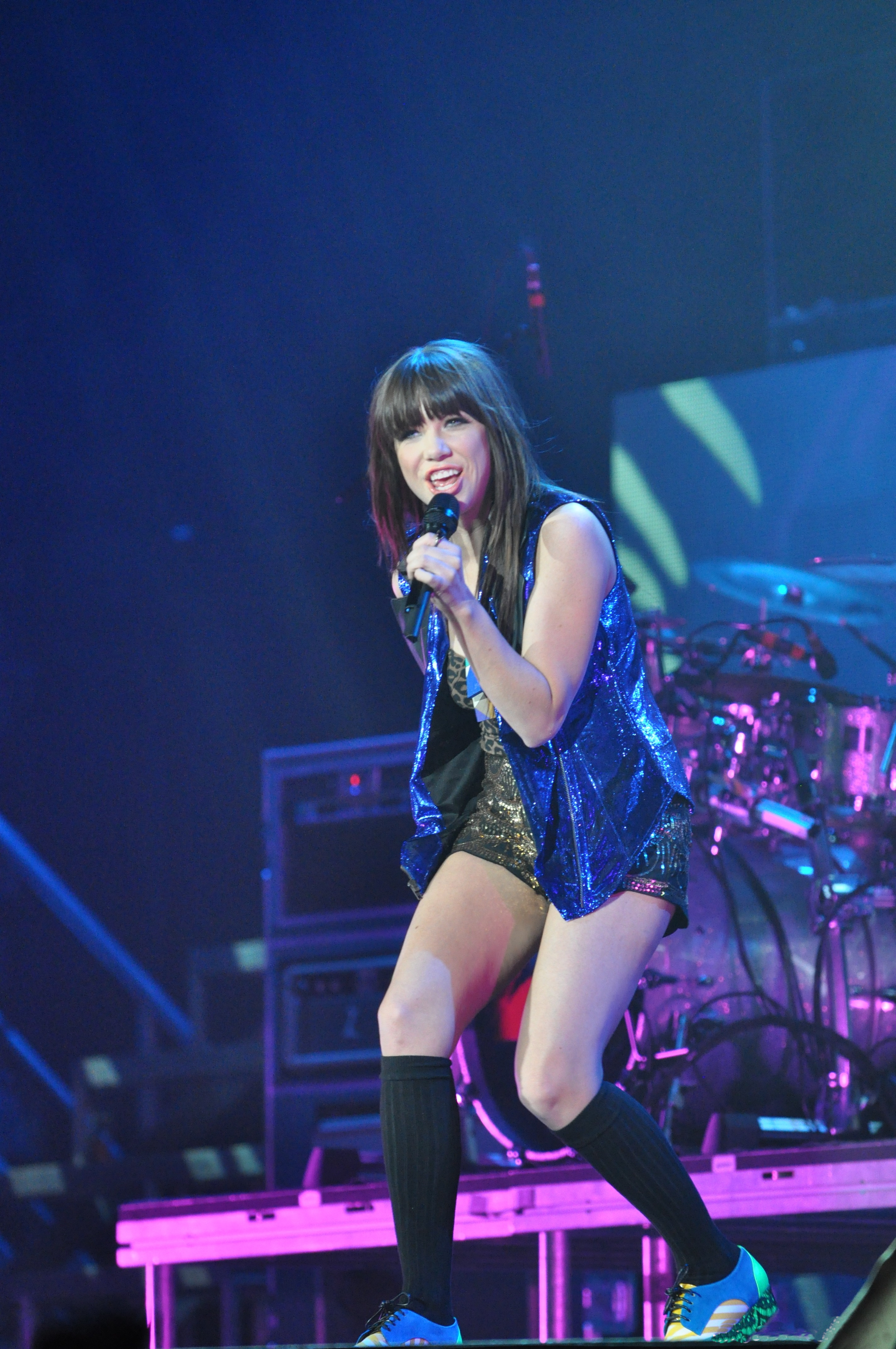
Jepsen performing "Tonight I'm Getting Over You" during Believe Tour in Minneapolis on October 20, 2012

=== Music video ===
On January 27, 2013, Jepsen revealed through her Facebook account that she would film the music video for "Tonight I'm Getting Over You" in Los Angeles the following weekend. Three days later, the singer revealed the filming was already done shooting the music video for the single before heading to Japan for her headlining Kiss Tour. The video premiered through VEVO on February 22, 2013. Jepsen's lover in the music video is model Brandon Gray. The video follows Jepsen as she cavorts with a male model and jumps transcendently before a gray background. Idolator blogged: "That part doesn’t totally make sense, but visually, it's a nice motif, sort of." Brittany Galla of AOL Music wrote that the video for "Tonight I'm Getting Over You" was more mature and emotional than the one for "Call Me Maybe".

=== Live performance ===
Jepsen performed "Tonight I'm Getting Over You" on the Believe Tour and The Summer Kiss Tour. On January 26, 2013, the singer performed it at the NRJ Music Awards. She also performed the song live with starting verses from her former single, "Call Me Maybe" on Juno Awards. Also in 2013, she performed the song at grand launching of NET.

== Formats and track listings ==
- Digital download
1. "Tonight I'm Getting Over You" — 3:39
- Digital EP — remixes
1. "Tonight I'm Getting Over You" (Showtek Remix) — 5:18
2. "Tonight I'm Getting Over You" (Twice As Nice Remix) — 3:40
3. "Tonight I'm Getting Over You" (Reid Stefan Remix) — 6:06
4. "Tonight I'm Getting Over You" (Wayne G & LFB Club Mix) — 7:07
5. "Tonight I'm Getting Over You" (KoKo Club Mix) — 4:53
- Digital download – remix single
1. "Tonight I'm Getting Over You" (featuring Nicki Minaj) — 4:02

== Charts ==
=== Weekly charts ===
Chart (2013)	Peak position
Australia (ARIA)	38
Belgium (Ultratip Bubbling Under Flanders)	6
Belgium (Ultratip Bubbling Under Wallonia)	6
Canada Hot 100 (Billboard)	88
Denmark (Tracklisten)	27
France (SNEP)	82
Ireland (IRMA)	32
Netherlands (Dutch Top 40)	29
Netherlands (Single Top 100)	44
New Zealand (Recorded Music NZ)	40
Poland Dance (ZPAV)	49
Scottish Singles Sales (Official Charts)	20
Slovakia Airplay (ČNS IFPI)	25
Switzerland (Schweizer Hitparade)	74
UK Singles (Official Charts)	33
US Billboard Hot 100	90
US Dance Club Songs (Billboard)	23
US Pop Airplay (Billboard)	32

=== Year-end charts ===
Chart (2013)	Position
Netherlands (Dutch Top 40)	170

== Certifications ==
Region	Certification	Certified units/sales
Denmark (IFPI Danmark)	Gold	900,000^{†}
^{†} Streaming-only figures based on certification alone.

== Radio and release history ==
Region	Date	Format	Label
France	January 21, 2013	Airplay	Polydor Records
United States	February 19, 2013	Mainstream radio	Interscope Records
United States	April 2, 2013	Digital Download — Remixes	Interscope Records
United Kingdom	May 27, 2013	Digital Download — Remixes	Polydor Records
Worldwide	May 6, 2013	Digital Download — Nicki Minaj remix	Interscope Records
