= Shooting Star (EP) =

EP by Owl City
- Released: May 15, 2012
- Recorded: 2009–2011
- Genre: Synth-pop; pop rock
- Length: 15:04
- Label: Universal Republic
- Producer: Adam Young

Owl City chronology
All Things Bright and Beautiful (2011)	Shooting Star (2012)	The Midsummer Station (2012)

Singles from Shooting Star
- 1. "Shooting Star" Released: May 15, 2012

Shooting Star is the second extended play by American electronica project Owl City, released on iTunes and other media outlets on May 15, 2012, through Universal Republic. The extended play consists of four new songs that would also be on Young's subsequent album, The Midsummer Station. Mark Hoppus, vocalist for Blink-182 is featured on the song "Dementia".

== Background ==
"Sometimes, bands release stuff and don't give anyone a heads up. The fans think, 'This kind of came out of nowhere with no explanation from the artist.' So I put out the EP for that reason."

—Adam Young on his decision to release the EP.

"Shooting Star" (2012)
Sample of the song "Shooting Star" - the single from Owl City's EP of the same name - showcasing his new musical 'style' on his recent work.

"I feel that as an artist you should never really look back or repeat yourself," Adam Young tells Billboard during an interview. Young was planning for a new album to be released in the summer of 2012 and Shooting Star "is just to help build excitement... for the [new] record coming out." His second extended play "is kind of a preview, and I wanted to make sure the four songs on the EP gave sort of an accurate snapshot or a taste of what the new record is about."

== Composition ==
Though Young stays true to his synthpop roots, the EP illustrates his efforts to create a polished and radio-friendly sound, dabbling heavily with European trance in "Shooting Star" and rock on "Dementia". "Gold" and "Take It All Away" have been described as pop-oriented tracks.

== Release ==
Along with the EP's release, "Shooting Star" was released as the lead single on May 15, 2012. Upon the EP's release, the remaining three tracks were exclusively streamed, "Gold" on Celebuzz, "Dementia" on Alternative Press and "Take It All Away" on Idolator, respectively. Owl City embarked on a promotional tour in North America and Europe in the summer of 2012, with Demi Lovato, in support of the EP.

== Critical reception ==
Professional ratings
Review scores
Source	Rating
Jesus Freak Hideout	4/5 stars

Matt Collar of AllMusic stated, "Musically, Shooting Star features more of Owl City's signature synth and melodic pop-oriented songs. Scott Fryberger of Jesus Freak Hideout called the lead track "Shooting Star", "poppy and very accessible." He stated that the song provides more of "a dance music vibe than the synthpop" Owl City usual does. He compared the second track "Gold", to Family Force 5's Dance or Die. He also described "Take It All Away" as the best track from the EP. Overall he remarked, "Shooting Star still provides for some good music, and a good appetizer for what's to come later this summer."

== Commercial performance ==
Shooting Star debuted on the Billboard 200 at number 49. The EP also peaked at number 12 on the US Billboard Digital Albums chart. The lead single "Shooting Star" peaked at number 36 on the US Hot Christian Songs chart. The song also peaked at number 49 on the Japan Hot 100. The songs, "Gold", "Take It All Away" and "Dementia" all entered the South Korean GAON International chart at number 138, number 163 and number 171 respectively.

== Track listing ==
Track listing according to Amazon.com

No.	Title	Writer(s)	Length
1.	"Shooting Star"	Adam Young, Mikkel S. Eriksen, Tor Erik Hermansen, Matthew Thiessen, Dan Omelio	4:07
2.	"Gold"	Josh Crosby, Nate Campany, Emily Wright	3:56
3.	"Dementia" (featuring Mark Hoppus)	Young	3:31
4.	"Take It All Away"	Young, Allan P. Grigg, Wright, Campany	3:30
Total length:			15:04

== Credits and personnel ==
Credits for Shooting Star adapted from AllMusic.

Owl City

- Adam Young – vocals, keyboards, guitars, drums, producer, engineer, art direction, audio mixer

Additional musicians and production

- Mikkel S. Eriksen – Additional instruments on Track 1, composer
- Tor Erik Hermansen – Additional instruments on Track 1, composer
- Josh Crosby – Additional instruments, backing vocals on Track 2, composer
- Dustin Sauder – Guitar on Track 2
- Mark Hoppus – Additional vocals on Track 3
- Kool Kojak – Additional instruments on Track 4
- Nate Campany – composer
- A.P. Grigg – composer
- Dan Omelio – composer
- Matthew Thiessen – composer
- Emily Wright – composer

== Charts ==
Chart performance for Shooting Star
Chart (2012)	Peak position
US Billboard 200	49
