= List of Canadian Hot 100 number-one singles of 2012 =

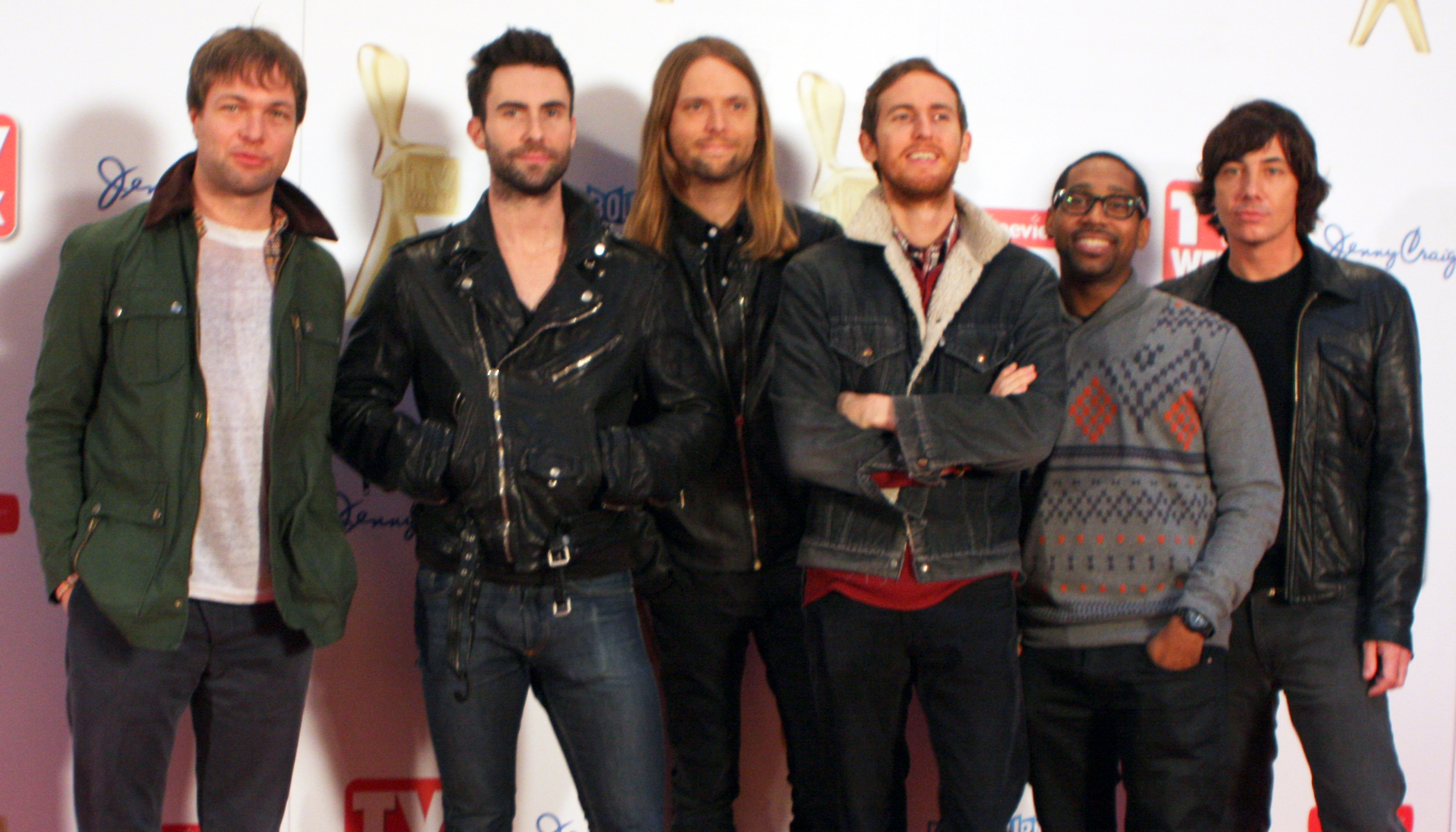
"Payphone" by Maroon 5 (pictured) featuring Wiz Khalifa spent eight weeks at number one, becoming the longest-running number-one single of the year.

This is a list of the Canadian Billboard magazine Canadian Hot 100 number-ones of 2012.

Note that Billboard publishes charts with an issue date approximately 7–10 days in advance.

== Chart history ==
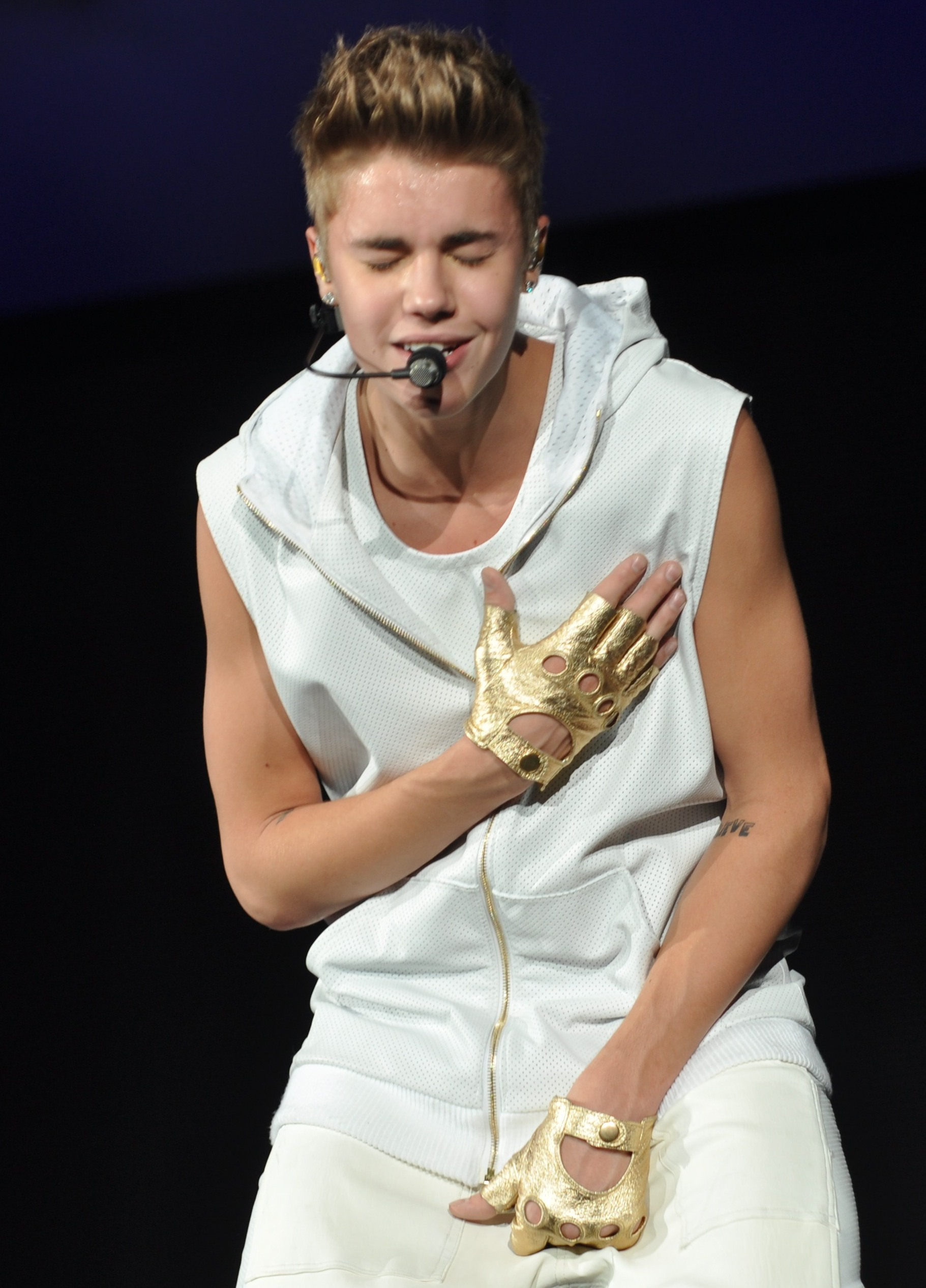
Canadian singer Justin Bieber (pictured) earned his first number-one single with "Boyfriend".

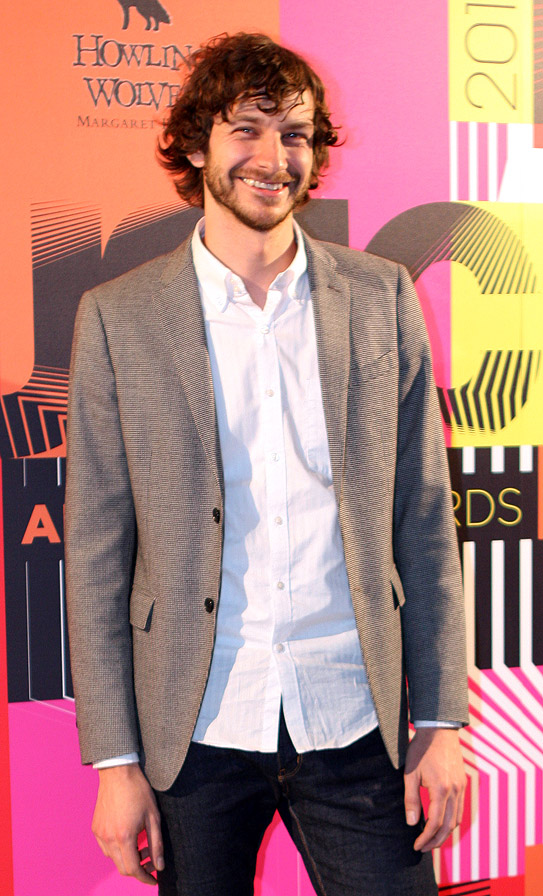
Gotye (pictured) and Kimbra scored their first number-one single with "Somebody That I Used to Know". It later ranked as the best-performing single of the year.

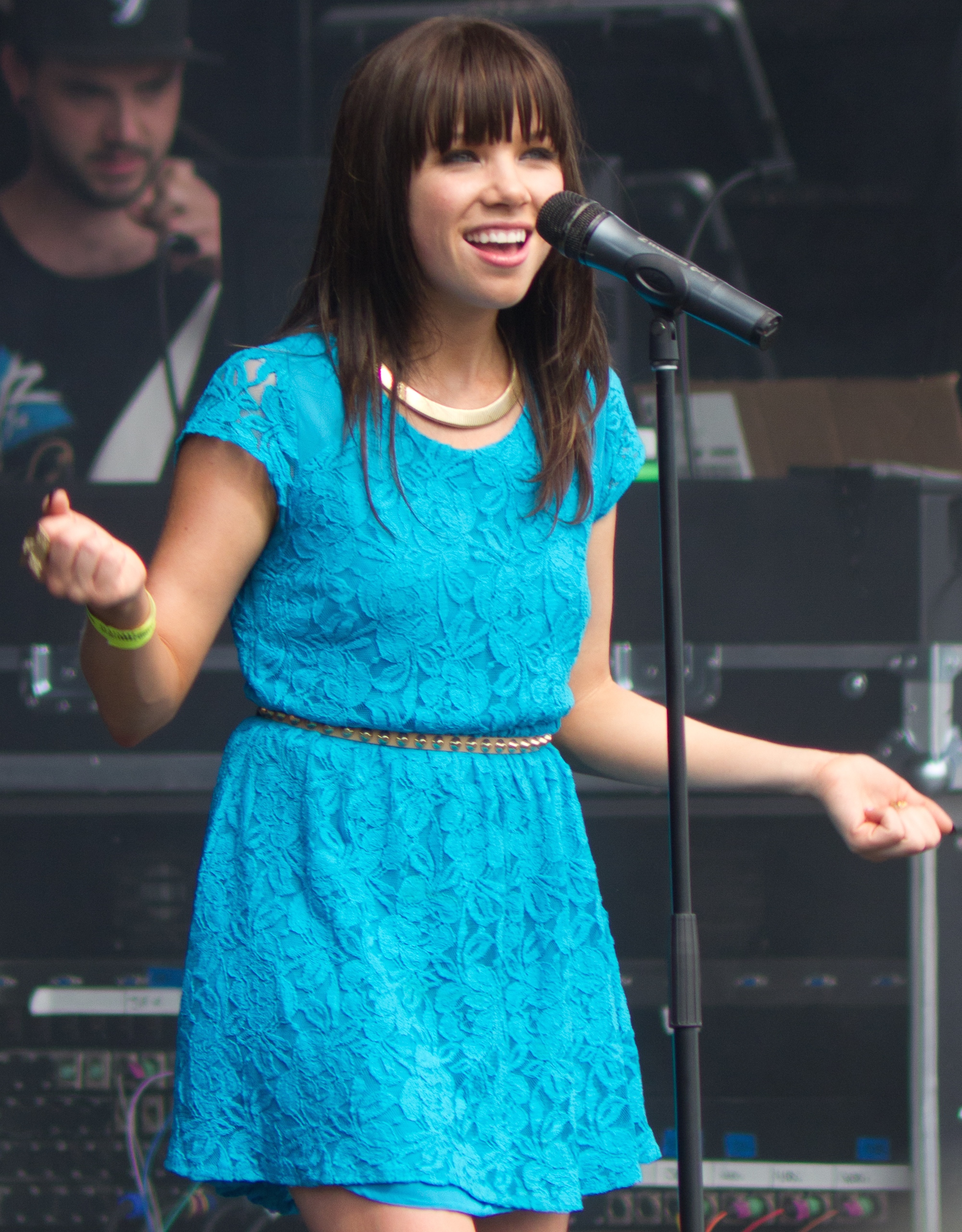
Canadian singer Carly Rae Jepsen (pictured) earned her first and second number-one singles with "Call Me Maybe" and "Good Time".

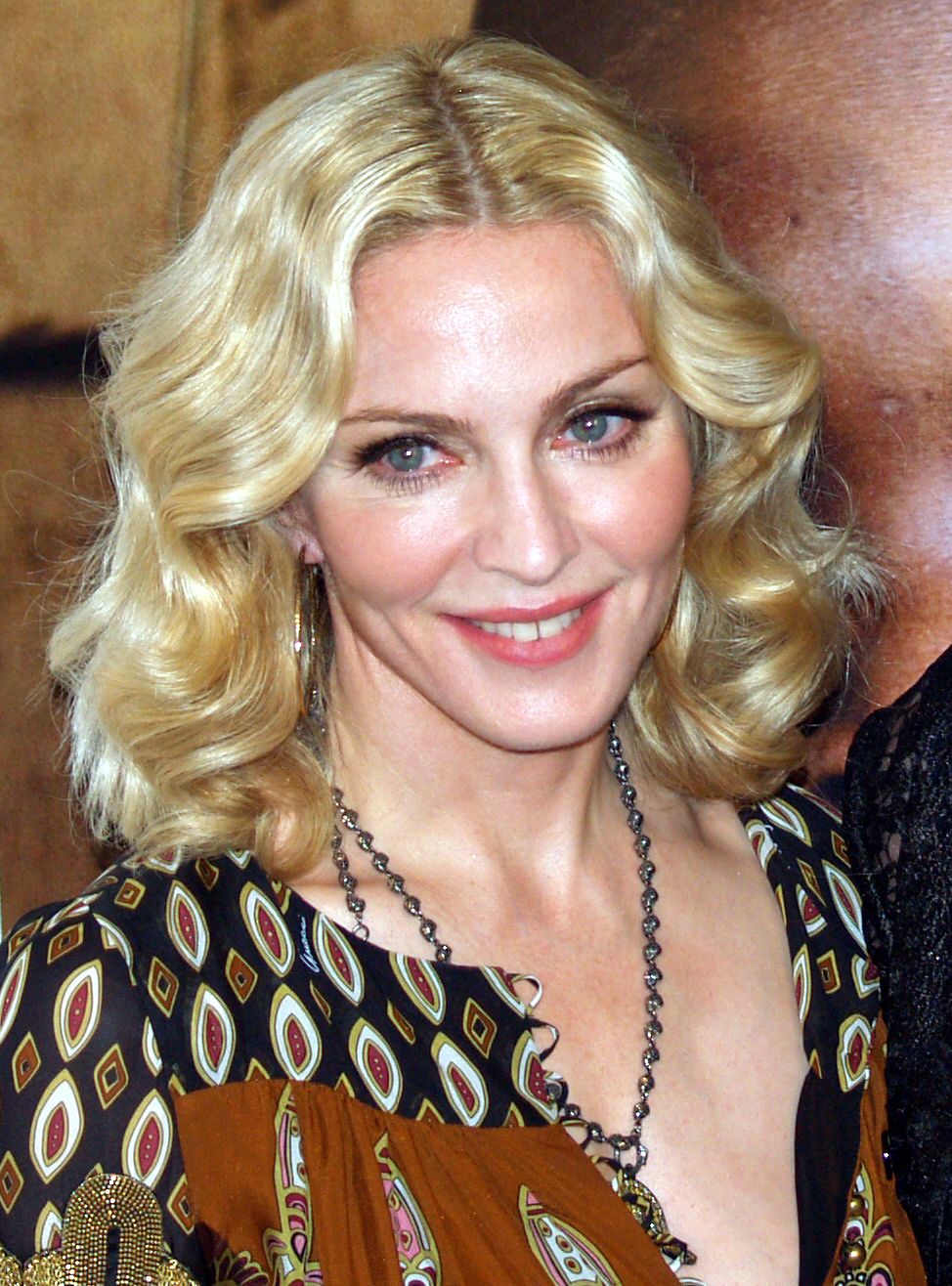
American singer Madonna (pictured) earned her second number-one single on the Canadian Hot 100 with "Give Me All Your Luvin'" and her record 25th number-one single in the overall Canadian Singles Chart's history.

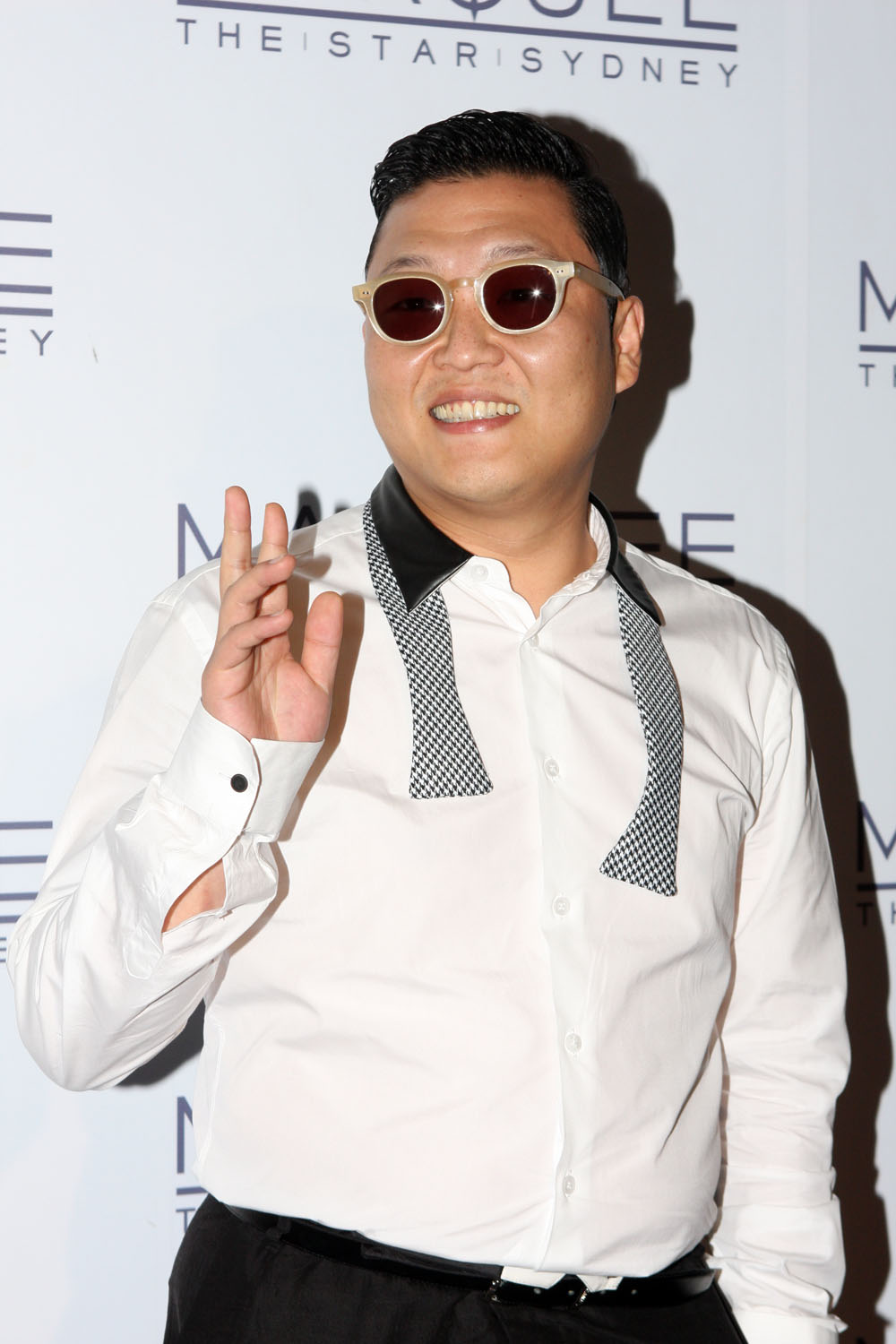
"Gangnam Style" by Psy (pictured) was the first non-English song to top the Canadian Hot 100.

Key
†	Indicates best-performing single of 2012

No.	Issue date	Song	Artist(s)	Ref.
re	January 7	"Sexy and I Know It"	LMFAO	
re	January 14	"Sexy and I Know It"	LMFAO	
re	January 21	"We Found Love"	Rihanna featuring Calvin Harris	
re	January 28	"We Found Love"	Rihanna featuring Calvin Harris	
re	February 4	"We Found Love"	Rihanna featuring Calvin Harris	
59	February 11	"Call Me Maybe"	Carly Rae Jepsen	
59	February 18	"Call Me Maybe"	Carly Rae Jepsen	
60	February 25	"Give Me All Your Luvin'"	Madonna featuring Nicki Minaj and M.I.A.	
61	March 3	"Part of Me"	Katy Perry	
re	March 10	"Call Me Maybe"	Carly Rae Jepsen	
re	March 17	"Call Me Maybe"	Carly Rae Jepsen	
62	March 24	"Wild Ones"	Flo Rida featuring Sia	
62	March 31	"Wild Ones"	Flo Rida featuring Sia	
63	April 7	"We Are Young"	Fun featuring Janelle Monáe	
64	April 14	"Boyfriend"	Justin Bieber	
65	April 21	"Somebody That I Used to Know" †	Gotye featuring Kimbra	
65	April 28	"Somebody That I Used to Know" †	Gotye featuring Kimbra	
65	May 5	"Somebody That I Used to Know" †	Gotye featuring Kimbra	
65	May 12	"Somebody That I Used to Know" †	Gotye featuring Kimbra	
65	May 19	"Somebody That I Used to Know" †	Gotye featuring Kimbra	
65	May 26	"Somebody That I Used to Know" †	Gotye featuring Kimbra	
66	June 2	"Payphone"	Maroon 5 featuring Wiz Khalifa	
66	June 9	"Payphone"	Maroon 5 featuring Wiz Khalifa	
66	June 16	"Payphone"	Maroon 5 featuring Wiz Khalifa	
66	June 23	"Payphone"	Maroon 5 featuring Wiz Khalifa	
66	June 30	"Payphone"	Maroon 5 featuring Wiz Khalifa	
66	July 7	"Payphone"	Maroon 5 featuring Wiz Khalifa	
66	July 14	"Payphone"	Maroon 5 featuring Wiz Khalifa	
66	July 21	"Payphone"	Maroon 5 featuring Wiz Khalifa	
67	July 28	"Wide Awake"	Katy Perry	
68	August 4	"Whistle"	Flo Rida	
68	August 11	"Whistle"	Flo Rida	
re	August 18	"Wide Awake"	Katy Perry	
re	August 25	"Wide Awake"	Katy Perry	
69	September 1	"We Are Never Ever Getting Back Together"	Taylor Swift	
70	September 8	"Good Time"	Owl City and Carly Rae Jepsen	
re	September 15	"We Are Never Ever Getting Back Together"	Taylor Swift	
re	September 22	"We Are Never Ever Getting Back Together"	Taylor Swift	
re	September 29	"We Are Never Ever Getting Back Together"	Taylor Swift	
71	October 6	"Gangnam Style"	Psy	
71	October 13	"Gangnam Style"	Psy	
71	October 20	"Gangnam Style"	Psy	
71	October 27	"Gangnam Style"	Psy	
71	November 3	"Gangnam Style"	Psy	
71	November 10	"Gangnam Style"	Psy	
71	November 17	"Gangnam Style"	Psy	
72	November 24	"Diamonds"	Rihanna	
72	December 1	"Diamonds"	Rihanna	
72	December 8	"Diamonds"	Rihanna	
72	December 15	"Diamonds"	Rihanna	
73	December 22	"Locked Out of Heaven"	Bruno Mars	
73	December 29	"Locked Out of Heaven"	Bruno Mars	

== See also ==
- List of number-one albums of 2012 (Canada)
