= Take a Picture (Carly Rae Jepsen song) =

Single by Carly Rae Jepsen
- Released: 21 May 2013
- Recorded: 2012/13
- Length: 3:24
- Label: School Boy; Interscope
- Songwriters: Carly Rae Jepsen; Edmund Thomas Dunne; Andrew Lawrence Bloch

Carly Rae Jepsen singles chronology
"Tonight I'm Getting Over You" (2013)	"Take a Picture" (2013)	"I Really Like You" (2015)

"Take a Picture" is a song by Canadian singer Carly Rae Jepsen. It was released on 21 May 2013 as a digital download through School Boy and Interscope Records. Carly Rae Jepsen teamed up with Coca-Cola and American Idol to help her finish writing the song.

== Live performances ==
On 15 May 2013, Carly Rae Jepsen performed the song live during the Top 2 Performance Show on American singing competition series American Idol. The song was part of the setlist of The Summer Kiss Tour.

== Commercial performance ==
The song debuted atop South Korea International Singles with 35,704 downloads.

== Charts ==
Chart (2013)	Peak position
South Korea International (Gaon)	1

== Release history ==
Region	Date	Format	Label
United States	21 May 2013	Digital download	Schoolboy Records; Interscope Records
