= I'm Coming After You =

Promotional single by Owl City

from the album The Midsummer Station
- Released: August 13, 2012
- Genre: Dance pop; EDM
- Length: 3:30
- Label: Universal Republic
- Songwriters: Adam Young; Matt Thiessen; Brian Lee
- Producer: Young

"I'm Coming After You" is a song by American electronica act Owl City. It was released on August 13, 2012, as the first promotional single from his fourth studio album, The Midsummer Station.

== Composition and lyrics ==
"I'm Coming After You" was written by Adam Young, Matt Thiessen and Brian Lee, while production was handled by Young. The track runs at 128 BPM. The song has been described as dance pop, EDM and an upbeat track. The track was inspired by dance and club music. Speaking about the song with Alternative Press, Young stated, "That stuff to me is so much fun, to create this sweeping, organic dance anthem. That’s always been so exciting to me from a production standpoint. Given where radio is these days and club music being so relevant right now, it was the perfect time to do this."

Lyrically, the song is about chasing after a lover, singing, "You've got the right to remain right here with me, I'm on your tail in a hot pursuit, love is a high speed chase racing down the street, woo woo woo, I'm coming after you." Additionally, the woos of the track represent the sirens of police cars. The lyrics of the song are also metaphors for a criminal investigation.

== Reception ==
Scott Fyrberge of Jesus Freak Hideout called the track one of "the best dance tracks," praising the piano part of the song. However, he stated that the lyrics were "pretty corny," and found the woos "more annoying than anything." He remarked, "the song would have been a bit better had that not been included." Billboard described the track as a "contemporary brand of club thump." Fred Thomas of AllMusic compared the track to "Give Me Everything" by Pitbull for how the song builds on a riff and beat combination.

== Credits and personnel ==
Credits for "I'm Coming After You" adapted from the liner notes of The Midsummer Station.

- Adam Young – composer, lyricist, producer, recording engineer
- Matthew Thiessen – composer, lyricist, background vocals
- Brian Lee – composer, lyricist, additional producer
- Robert Orton – mixing engineer
- Ted Jensen – mastering

== Charts ==
Chart performance for "I'm Coming After You"
Chart (2013)	Peak position
UK Christian Songs (Cross Rhythms)	4

== Release history ==
Release dates and formats for "I'm Coming After You"
Region	Date	Format	Label	Ref.
Various	August 13, 2012	Streaming	Universal Republic	
