= The Midsummer Station =

Studio album by Owl City
- Released: August 17, 2012
- Recorded: 2011–2012
- Studios: Sky Harbor Studios (Owatonna, MN), Rock the Mic Studios (New York City, NY), Kustom Deluxe Studios (Nashville, TN), Signalpath Studios (Almonte, ON), The Terrarium (Minneapolis, MN), Mound Sound (University City, MO)
- Genres: Synth-pop; dance-pop; electropop
- Length: 40:50
- Label: Universal Republic
- Producers: Josh Crosby; KoOoL Kojak; Brian Lee; Matthew Thiessen; Stargate; Adam Young

Owl City chronology
Shooting Star (2012)	The Midsummer Station (2012)	The Midsummer Station - Acoustic (2013)

Singles from The Midsummer Station
- 1. "Shooting Star" Released: May 15, 2012; 2. "Good Time" Released: June 26, 2012

The Midsummer Station is the fourth studio album by American electronica project Owl City. It was released on August 17, 2012, by Universal Republic Records. The album debuted at No. 7 on the Billboard 200 selling 30,000 copies in its first week. In support of the album, Owl City went on the Midsummer Station World Tour.

== Writing and development ==
After Owl City's previous album, All Things Bright and Beautiful (2011), sold 143,000 copies in the United States, Adam Young began working on demo tracks for The Midsummer Station in January 2012. Unlike his previous albums, Young worked with different songwriters and producers for the first time, including Stargate and Emily Wright. However, Young again collaborated with Matthew Thiessen for his third album in a row along with Ocean Eyes and All Things Bright and Beautiful. Young was initially scared of the thought of collaborating with others, "I've never worked with anybody before. I've done everything myself except for mastering. It's a big job for one guy, especially a perfectionist, so I knew I wanted to try to experiment with other people." The song "Dementia", which features Blink-182 singer Mark Hoppus, was mixed by Chris Lord-Alge. During the All Things Bright and Beautiful Tour in 2011, Young performed a new song entitled "I Hope You Think of Me", a track he was unsure would make the final track listing on the album. The song eventually appeared on his 2013 acoustic EP, The Midsummer Station - Acoustic.

On March 22, 2012, Owl City announced that he plans to release his fourth album sometime in August. On May 15, 2012, Young released the Shooting Star extended play, which consisted of four songs that would be featured on The Midsummer Station. Many criticized the EP, saying it was very different from Young's previous works. On his blog, Young defended his choice for the new sound of the extended play and the album, stating that he believes "it's a bummer for an artist of any kind to hear, 'Yeah it's great but it's a lot like your previous work.' (...) Creativity is all about pushing boundaries and pressing onward". In an interview with AOL Music, Young stated that the tracks on this record are much darker, with more influence of his own dreams, nightmares and self-reflection, highlighting "Dementia" as an example.

The album was originally planned to have a release date of August 14, 2012, worldwide, apart from the United Kingdom where it would be released on September 17, 2012. On June 21, 2012, it was announced that the worldwide release date would be pushed back to August 21, 2012, "due to some exciting developments," according to Young. On July 12, 2012, Young announced that the UK release date would be brought forward to August 20, 2012. The album was released on August 17 in other countries including Australia.

== Composition ==
The album comprises 11 tracks and is described as synth-pop, dance-pop and electropop. Owl City pointed out that the album "sounds a lot different," compared to his previous records. Incorporating European dance music influences, he cited inspiration from Tiesto, Armin van Buurenand Paul van Dyk, among many more. However, he said the album was still an "electronic pop record but with more energy and spirit and frame of reference." He also claimed that he wanted to do something different and to avoid repeating himself. Tracks such as "I'm Coming After You" and "Speed of Love" contains EDM elements, which were influenced by European trance music. "Shooting Star" and "Gold" were described as synth and dance-pop, as well as the up-tempo track "Dreams and Disasters". The punk rock track "Dementia", is described by Young as a "darker song" and speaks about "the consequences of wallowing in regret." Straying away from the electronic elements, the song "Silhouette" is a ballad track, showcasing Young singing about a much softer topic.

== Artwork ==
The artwork was created by Gediminas Pranckevicius in 2009. Pranckevicius' artwork often explores the struggle between man and nature by combining man-made structures with flora and fauna, all coexisting in a forced, urban manner. In Time, there are multiple juxtapositions at work. Beneath the surface is the vertical, wooden shantytown, neatly residing next to a vertical lake in which a very large fish swims. The shanty is illuminated, detailed and clear. By contrast, the waters are dark and murky. Above the busy shanty town is a solitary tree on a serene grassland and a solitary man in a boat on the lake. Everything surrounding the shanty is simple and peaceful. The shanty, though great to look at, is chaotic and saturated. It is only a matter of time before the human settlement expands above the surface or invades the water.

Between 2011–2012, Owl City held an open art contest, where the winner's artwork would be selected as the cover of The Midsummer Station. Ultimately, Gediminas Pranckevicius won the contest, after submitting his creation Time. On May 30, 2012, the album was officially revealed.

== Release ==
The EP's title track, "Shooting Star" was released on May 15, 2012. The song was intended to be the lead single from The Midsummer Station, but the Carly Rae Jepsen collaboration "Good Time" was chosen instead, due to the success of Jepsen's "Call Me Maybe". "Good Time" was released on June 26, 2012. The song was met with commercial success peaking at No. 8 on the Billboard Hot 100. The song reached No. 1 in Canada and New Zealand. The song was certified 2× Platinum by the RIAA in December 2012.

Days before the release of The Midsummer Station, Owl City released a few songs from the album for streaming. "I'm Coming After You" was released on August 13, 2012, as the first promotional single. The song was made available for streaming via Seventeen magazine. "Dreams and Disasters" premiered on August 14, through SoundCloud. "Silhouette" was released for streaming via PopCrush on August 15. On August 20, "Metropolis" was made available for streaming through Idolator as the second promotional single from the album.

== Promotion ==
In July 2012, Owl City announced the Midsummer Station World Tour. Spanning across North America, Europe, Asia and Oceania, the tour began in September, and concluded in November. Action Item and Matthew Koma supported Owl City on the tour in North America, the latter also joined him in Europe. Owl City also made multiple televised performances with Carly Rae Jepsen, appearing on Conan, The Tonight Show, The Today Show, Arthur Ashe Kids' Day, and America's Got Talent to perform "Good Time", in support of the album.

== Reception ==
=== Critical response ===
Professional ratings
Aggregate scores
Source	Rating
Metacritic	52/100
Review scores
Source	Rating
AllMusic	2.5/5 stars
Alternative Press	3.5/5 stars
American Songwriter	1/5 stars
The A.V. Club	B
BBC Music	favourable
Jesus Freak Hideout	2.5/5 stars
Newsday	A−
Rolling Stone	2/5 stars
Spin	4/10 stars
USA Today	3/4 stars

The album received mixed reviews from music critics upon its release. As of December 9, 2013, the album received an average score of 52 based on 11 reviews at Metacritic, which assigns a normalized rating out of 100 to reviews from mainstream critics, which indicates "mixed or average reviews". Fred Thomas of AllMusic gave a mixed review on the album. He stated that the album, "is the most transparent bid for mainstream airplay imaginable, with each of its 11 tracks so tailored for pop radio, teen movie soundtracks, and soft drink commercials." He criticized the album for how "recycled" it feels. However, he praised the songs, "Metropolis" and "Dementia" as one of the album's redeeming tracks. Scott Fryberger of Jesus Freak Hideout also gave a mixed review criticizing the first track "Dreams and Disasters" as "empty and bland." He did however complimented the songs "I'm Coming After You" and "Speed of Love" as "the better tracks" musically. He ended off calling the album "a severe misstep" for Owl City. Jody Rosen of Rolling Stone gave a negative review remarking that, "he delivers universally annoying synth-pop pep talks" on the tracks "Shooting Star" and "Dreams and Disasters". Nekesa Mumbi Moody of the Associated Press stated that the album "sounds like the soundtrack for one of those Nickelodeon or Disney TV movies you either enjoyed as a tween or endured as an adult." She called the tracks "generic," and are "formulaic and forgettable." The New Zealand Herald gave the album a 2 out of 5 five rating and remarked, "There's no doubt Young knows how to write strong hooks, but many of these 11 tracks feel like they could've been written by an algorithm. Several tracks here are undoubtedly hit material, but en masse they can feel over-produced and unmemorable." Briana Altergott of Vox said of the album, "maybe, just maybe, Owl City can find that magical something again in the future and craft some music worthy of 'Fireflies'."

Glenn Gamboa of Newsday gave a positive review for the album calling it a "streamlined dance pop" album that is "deceptively simple." Alternative Press also gave a positive review stating, "Almost half of the album is bolstered by huge beats and pulsating bass. Even so, the disc's best tracks are the ones that don't employ this formula." The A.V. Club stated that the album is "paired with a more expansive, diverse sound." Billboard stated, "Young oozes frothy positivity through the urgent thump of 'Dreams and Disasters', the energetic bounce of the Stargate-produced single 'Shooting Star', the stuttering chorus of 'Gold' and the effervescent sweep of 'Metropolis'." They also added, "'I'm Coming After You” and 'Speed of Love' are driven by a more contemporary brand of club thump." Tony Cummings of Cross Rhythms praised the collaboration on "Dementia" stating, "It's something you wouldn't expect would work but with Mr Hopus bellowing across the thudding rhythms it sounds great." He also complimented the track, "Speed of Love" for its lyrics that, "reflects on the transient nature of human existence."

=== Commercial performance ===
The Midsummer Station debuted at No. 7 on the Billboard 200 in the United States, with first-week sales of 30,000 copies. Digital downloads accounted for 72 percent of the album's first-week total. In December 2012, the album sold 92,775 copies in the US. In the United Kingdom the album debuted at No. 34, selling 3,281 copies in its first week. The album also peaked at No. 1 on the Billboard Canadian Albums Chart with first week sales of 3,700 copies. As of November 2012, the album has sold over 200,000 copies worldwide.

== Track listing ==
No.	Title	Writer(s)	Producer(s)	Length
1.	"Dreams and Disasters"	Adam Young, Emily Wright, Nate Campany	Young	3:45
2.	"Shooting Star"	Young, Mikkel S. Eriksen, Tor Erik Hermansen, Matt Thiessen, Daniel Omelio	Stargate, Young	4:07
3.	"Gold"	Josh Crosby, Campany, Wright	Crosby, Young (add.)	3:56
4.	"Dementia" (featuring Mark Hoppus)	Young	Young	3:31
5.	"I'm Coming After You"	Young, Thiessen, Brian Lee	Young, Lee (add.)	3:30
6.	"Speed of Love"	Young, Thiessen, Sam Hollander	Young	3:28
7.	"Good Time" (featuring Carly Rae Jepsen)	Young, Thiessen, Lee	Young	3:26
8.	"Embers"	Young, Wright, Campany	Young	3:45
9.	"Silhouette"	Young	Young	4:12
10.	"Metropolis"	Young, Thiessen	Young, Thiessen (add.)	3:39
11.	"Take It All Away"	Young, Allan P. Grigg, Wright, Campany	Kool Kojak, Young	3:31

iTunes Store bonus track
No.	Title	Writer(s)	Producer(s)	Length
12.	"Bombshell Blonde"	Young, Thiessen	Young	3:26

Japanese edition bonus track
No.	Title	Writer(s)	Producer(s)	Length
12.	"Top of the World"	Young	Young	3:30

== Personnel ==
Credits adapted from the liner notes of The Midsummer Station.

Owl City

- Adam Young – vocals, drum programming, keyboards, piano, celeste, synthesizers, guitar, bass, lap steel, sampler, drums, percussion, glockenspiel, bells, accordion, loops

Additional musicians

- Mark Hoppus – additional vocals on track 4
- Carly Rae Jepsen – additional vocals on track 7
- The Minneapolis Youth Chorus – additional vocals on track 7
- Keith Kenniff – bowed double bass, synthesizer, drums on track 9
- Dustin Sauder – electric and acoustic guitars on track 3
- Chris Carmichael – violin, viola, cello on tracks 8 & 10
- Matthew Thiessen – background vocals on tracks 5 & 7
- Josh Crosby – additional drums, keyboards, programming, background vocals on track 3
- Mikkel S. Eriksen – guitar, bass, keyboards on track 2
- Tor Erik Hermansen – additional keyboards, programming on track 2
- Kool Kojak – additional keyboards, programming on track 11

Additional personnel

- Gediminas Pranckevicius – cover artwork

== Charts ==
=== Weekly charts ===
Weekly chart performance for The Midsummer Station
Chart (2012)	Peak position
Australian Albums (ARIA)	29
Belgian Albums (Ultratop Flanders)	82
Belgian Albums (Ultratop Wallonia)	144
Canadian Albums (Billboard)	1
Croatian International Albums (HDU)	36
Dutch Albums (Album Top 100)	36
French Albums (SNEP)	88
German Albums (Offizielle Top 100)	44
Japanese Albums (Oricon)	19
New Zealand Albums (RMNZ)	24
Norwegian Albums (VG-lista)	35
Scottish Albums (Official Charts)	44
South Korean Albums (Circle)	63
Swiss Albums (Schweizer Hitparade)	61
Taiwanese Albums (Five Music)	4
UK Albums (Official Charts)	34
US Billboard 200	7

=== Year end charts ===
Year-end performance for The Midsummer Station
Chart (2012)	Peak position
Canadian Albums (Nielsen SoundScan)	102
