= This Kiss (Carly Rae Jepsen song) =

Single by Carly Rae Jepsen

from the album Kiss
- Released: September 10, 2012
- Recorded: Party Rock Studio, 2012
- Genre: Dance-pop
- Length: 3:49
- Label: 604; School Boy; Interscope
- Songwriters: Carly Rae Jepsen; Matthew Koma; Kelly Covell; Stefan Kendal Gordy
- Producers: Matthew Koma; Redfoo

Carly Rae Jepsen singles chronology
"Good Time" (2012)	"This Kiss" (2012)	"Tonight I'm Getting Over You" (2013)

"This Kiss" is a song by Canadian singer Carly Rae Jepsen from her second studio album, Kiss (2012). The song was written by Jepsen, Matthew Koma, Kelly Covell and Redfoo of electropop duo LMFAO through e-mails, text messaging and telephone calls, with production handled by Koma and Redfoo. It was recorded in 2012, at Redfoo's Party Rock Studio. "This Kiss" was released as the third single from the album on September 10, 2012, through 604 Records, Schoolboy Records, and Interscope Records.

The mid-tempo dance-pop track lyrically speaks about a kiss being something Jepsen can't resist and the lips of her beloved. "This Kiss" received mostly positive reviews from music critics, who compared it to "Call Me Maybe" and "Good Time". However, it failed to match the success of her previous singles, only reaching the top three in South Korea, while missing the top ten in countries such as Canada and United Kingdom. In the United States, the song peaked at 86 on the Billboard Hot 100 prior to its single release, and at number 37 on Pop Songs.

An accompanying music video was released on October 26, 2012, at the Fun Size film premiere, portraying Jepsen flirting with a man in a club. The song itself appeared during the end credits of the film, released in 2012. To promote its release as a single, Jepsen performed "This Kiss" on The Ellen DeGeneres Show, the Late Show with David Letterman, and at the 2012 American Music Awards. It was additionally performed by Jepsen herself during an episode of the teen drama 90210.

== Background and composition ==
"This Kiss" (2012)
A 19-second sample of the chorus which features Jepsen singing about an irresistible kiss from her lover.

"This Kiss" was written by Jepsen, Kelly Covell, Matthew Koma, and Stefan Kendal Gordy, also known as Redfoo from electropop duo LMFAO, through e-mails, text messaging and telephone calls. Jepsen explained that she had "never written a song that way before so I'd definitely say it was new," adding that "there was something really exciting about being on the phone and singing ideas to each other and then calling each other back and re-writing lyrics in your BlackBerry and iPhone and seeing it all being exchanged." The singer also revealed that she was pleased with the creative process of the song, commenting that "despite all this craziness, [it] remains the same. And that same exciting feeling that I had before anybody knew me, when I was just beginning to work on 'Call Me Maybe', is the same feeling I had today with Redfoo from LMFAO. You can sense the people who really have it are about writing that right word or that right melody to make it lift and make you feel that perfect emotion." "This Kiss" was recorded at Party Rock Studio with Redfoo in 2012 after Redfoo recorded ideas at Sonic Vista Studios Ibiza, Spain, and was released as the second single from Kiss on September 10, 2012. "This Kiss" is a mid-tempo dance-pop track which lyrically speaks about a kiss being something Jepsen can't resist and the lips of her beloved, featuring lyrics such as "This kiss is something I can't resist/ Your lips are undeniable/This kiss is something I can't risk/Your heart is unreliable" during the chorus. Carl Williot of Idolator compared the lyrics to the ones of Hall & Oates' "Kiss on My List" (1981).

== Critical reception ==
"This Kiss" received mostly positive reviews from music critics. Amy Sciarretto of Pop Crush rated the song four out of five stars, describing it "as sweet and as cavity-causing" as Jepsen's debut international single "Call Me Maybe" (2011). Sciaretto added that it was possible that "This Kiss" could be one of the biggest songs of the fall of 2012. Billboard critic Jason Lipshutz deemed the song "as undeniable as the lips of the lyrical object of affection who (gasp!) isn't the boy she has back home." Heather Phares of Allmusic wrote that "This Kiss" is musically similar to "typical pop" songs, but added that the lyrics are "better written than the work of most of her competition." Carl Williot of Idolator was sure that the song would "monopolize" radio stations like "Good Time" (2012), and added that "with the dance beat and vocal effects," the singer was "going for dance floor domination as well."

== Commercial performance ==
Following its release as a single, "This Kiss" failed to match the success of Jepsen's previous singles, debuting at number 86 on the US Billboard Hot 100 on the week ending September 29, 2012, before falling off the chart the following week. The song managed to stay for one week on the New Zealand Singles Chart at number 39, and on the French Singles Chart at number 173. In Japan, it reached number 65 on the country's Hot 100 chart, while peaking at number 23 on the Canadian Hot 100. As of November 30, 2012, the song has sold over 115,000 downloads in United States according to Nielsen SoundScan.

== Music video ==
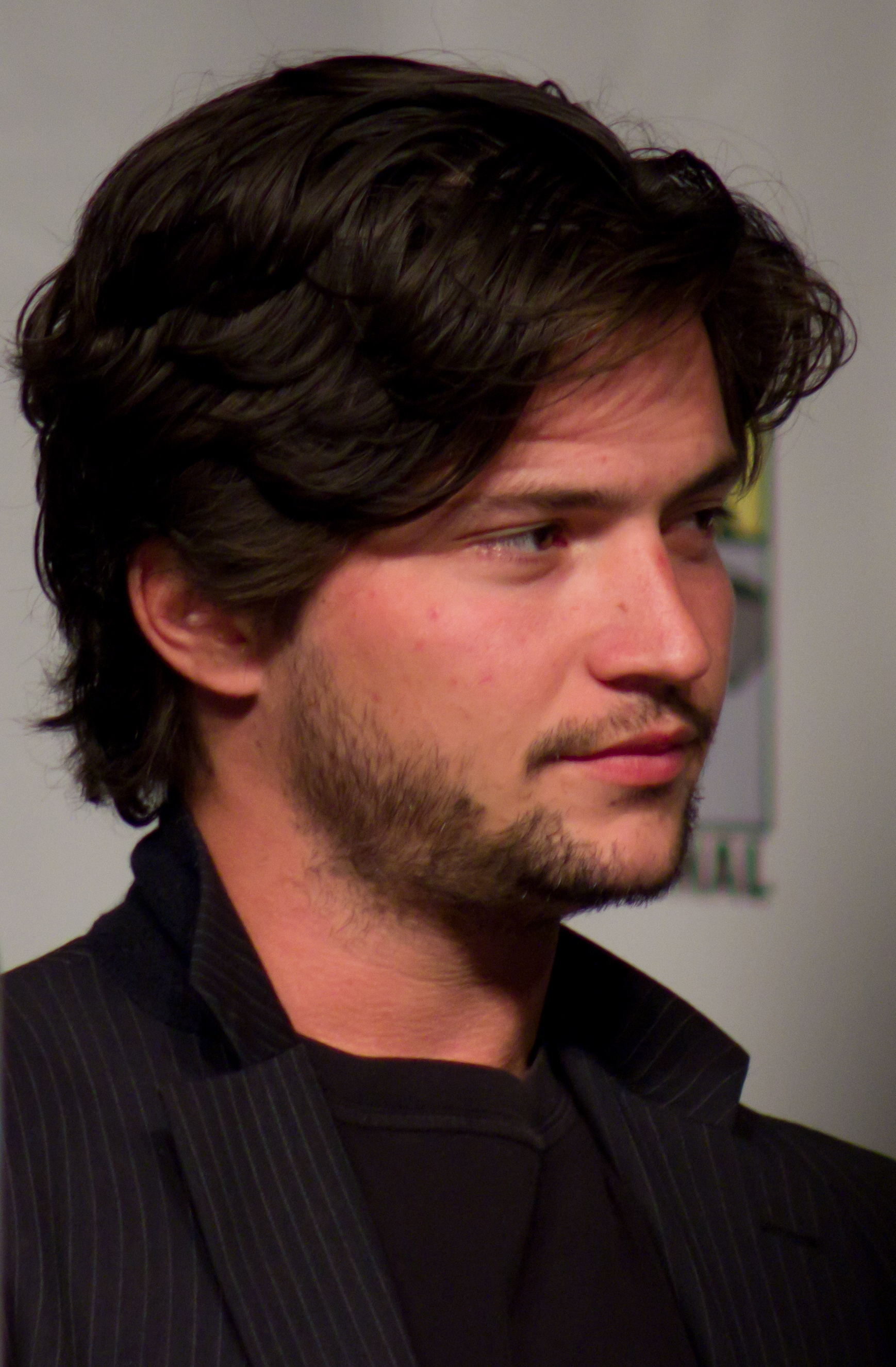
American actor Thomas McDonell made a cameo appearance.

Filming for the music video began on September 20, 2012, with shots of Jepsen on set of the music video surfacing online the same day. She was pictured wearing a pair of leather pants along with a red-black corset and a silver chain hanging from her waist. On October 8, 2012, a 24-second teaser was uploaded to YouTube featuring Jepsen performing the track at a party, falling for a guy in a grey beanie and then jumping into a swimming pool with him for a kiss. Two weeks later, the singer tweeted, "the music video for This Kiss is coming soooo soon! Until then here is a little preview. Hope you enjoy it! Mwah x," followed by the link of the teaser. A lyric video, which "channels the familiar opening credits of the classic show Saved by the Bell as noted by Carl Williot of Idolator, was released on October 18, 2012. The music video premiered on October 26, 2012, at the Fun Size film premiere, and was released online on October 28, 2012. Directed by Justin Francis, the video starts with Jepsen and her fellow friends driving a Fiat 500. After they come out of the car, they follow to a '80s inspired warehouse, where Jepsen starts flirting with a guy (actor Kurt Collins). The guy is immediately attracted to her, and, as the video comes to a close, they dive in a pool and kiss. Fun Size star Thomas McDonell made a cameo appearance.

== Live performances and usage in media ==
Jepsen's first performance of "This Kiss" was on The Ellen DeGeneres Show on September 18, 2012, and later the same day on So You Think You Can Dance season 9 finale. On October 25, 2012, the singer performed the song on the Late Show with David Letterman. For the performance, Jepsen sported a shimmery dress and slick jacket. Jepsen also performed the song at the halftime show of the 100th Grey Cup, in a medley with "Call Me Maybe" at the 2012 American Music Awards, and at Walmart Soundcheck. Although Jepsen did not appear in the film, "This Kiss" was featured in the end credits of the comedy film Fun Size. As a promotion for the song and the film, people who bought a ticket to watch Fun Size before November 4, 2012 would get a free download of "This Kiss". The singer performed the song on the television show 90210 on episode "Til Death Do Us Part" that she guest featured.

== Formats and track listings ==
- Digital download
1. "This Kiss" – 3:49
- Digital EP – remixes
1. "This Kiss" (Jason Nevins Remix) – 4:11
2. "This Kiss" (Digital Dog Radio Edit) – 4:13
3. "This Kiss" (Brass Knuckles Remix) – 4:05
4. "This Kiss" (Mathieu Bouthier Remix) – 6:45
- UK digital download
1. "This Kiss" – 3:49
2. "This Kiss" (Digital Dog Radio Edit) – 4:13
3. "This Kiss" (Brass Knuckles Remix) – 4:05
4. "This Kiss" (Mathieu Bouthier Remix) – 6:45

== Credits and personnel ==
=== Recording locations ===
- Recorded at Party Rock Studio in 2012.

=== Personnel ===
- Carly Rae Jepsen — lead vocals, songwriter
- Matthew Koma – songwriter, producer
- Stefan Kendal Gordy — songwriter, producer
- Kelly Covell – songwriter

Credits adapted from the liner notes of Kiss.

== Charts ==
Chart (2012–13)	Peak position
Belgium (Ultratip Bubbling Under Flanders)	1
Belgium (Ultratip Bubbling Under Wallonia)	12
Canada Hot 100 (Billboard)	23
Canada CHR/Top 40 (Billboard)	45
Canada Hot AC (Billboard)	42
France (SNEP)	152
Germany (GfK)	64
Ireland (IRMA)	64
Japan (Billboard Japan Hot 100)	65
Netherlands (Single Top 100)	58
New Zealand (Recorded Music NZ)	39
South Korea International Singles (Gaon)	2
Spanish Airplay Chart (Promusicae)	20
UK Singles (Official Charts Company)	166
US Billboard Hot 100	86
US Pop Songs (Billboard)	37

== Release history ==
Region	Date	Format	Label
Canada	September 10, 2012	Digital download	604 Records
United States	September 10, 2012	Digital download	Interscope Records
Japan	September 12, 2012	Digital download	School Boy Records/Interscope Records
United States	October 8, 2012	Mainstream airplay	School Boy Records/Interscope Records
United Kingdom	December 7, 2012	Digital download	Polydor Records
United States	December 11, 2012	Digital download – remixes	Interscope Records
