= Cinematic (Owl City album) =

Studio album by Owl City
- Released: June 1, 2018
- Recorded: January 2017
- Studio: Sky Harbor Studios, Owatonna, Minnesota
- Genre: Synth-pop; dream pop
- Length: 73:22
- Label: Sky Harbor Records
- Producer: Adam Young

Owl City chronology
| Reel 3 (2018) | Cinematic (2018) | Coco Moon (2023) |

Singles from Cinematic
- 1. "Not All Heroes Wear Capes" Released: June 15, 2017; 2. "All My Friends" Released: November 3, 2017; 3. "Lucid Dream" Released: January 12, 2018; 4. "New York City" Released: March 9, 2018

Cinematic is the sixth studio album by Owl City. It was released independently via Sky Harbor on June 1, 2018. The album debuted at number 115 on the Billboard 200. Upon the albums release, Young released three "reels" EPs that would include some songs on the album.

== Background ==
Following the 2015 Owl City album Mobile Orchestra, Adam Young announced that he would suspend work on Owl City to undertake a project of instrumental scores; he released one score, or album, each month in 2016 except January. Also in 2016, he released a Christmas single named "Humbug," which was released for free download and independently. "Not All Heroes Wear Capes," which was released on June 15, 2017, was dedicated for Father's Day of that year. It was originally intended as a non-album single, but would go on to comprise part of Reel 2 and Cinematic.

Young hinted after the conclusion of the Scores project that work on Owl City had resumed and a new album was in progress; this was revealed, on October 30, 2017, to be Cinematic. Young distinguished Cinematic from existing Owl City releases by stating that its content would center around events from his life rather than ethereal concepts (he clarified after the album's release that all prior Owl City work "was pure imagination," and Cinematic was "the first album [to] hold songs written from a personal perspective"). Album artwork and release date were revealed concurrently with the name, followed shortly by a track listing. The album has 18 tracks in total, with 15 main songs and 3 alternate recordings.

== Composition ==
The album has a more personal and autobiographical theme to it. Young had written songs about his hometown, family and his personal experiences, which he describes as "watching a scene or a highlight of my life." Particularly, "Not All Heroes Wear Capes" was written about his dad and how he is a "hero" to him, and "Always" which was written about his dad's health struggles. Other songs such as "The 5th of July" details Young's birth and "New York City" tells a story about his trip out east. "Fiji Water" was also written about a trip to New York, this time detailing his story getting signed to Universal Records, prior to the success of his single "Fireflies" from his 2009 album, Ocean Eyes. The title track was described by Young as a "summary track," summing up all the moments he loved from his life. Despite majority of the album consisting of autobiographical songs, "Lucid Dream" was a bit abstract and featured more imagery, written about a strange dream Young had. Musically, the album contains pop, ballads, rock and electronic sounds.

== Release ==
Young elected to precipitate Cinematic's release with three successive "reels," each containing three songs from the full album. Early releases included the album's lead single "All My Friends," which was released on November 3, 2017, and would go on to comprise part of Reel 1. The EP was released on December 1, and, in addition to "All My Friends," included "Fiji Water" and "The 5th of July."

"Lucid Dream," intended as the lead single for Reel 2, was released on January 12, 2018. The reel itself was released on February 2, including, in addition to "Lucid Dream," "Montana" and a new electric version of "Not All Heroes Wear Capes." The lead single for Reel 3, "New York City," was released on March 9, with the reel following on April 6. In addition to "New York City," it included "Cloud Nine" and "Be Brave."

Music videos were recorded for each of the three singles. Each video features the same characters and is loosely connected to the others; a "director's cut" of all three was released shortly after the standalone version of the third.

Cinematic and its preceding reels were released on Sky Harbor Records, an independent label owned by Young, confirming the end of Owl City's affiliation with Universal Republic. (All albums from the Scores project had been released on Sky Harbor, but under Young's own name, not as Owl City.) In addition to Cinematic, Sky Harbor retains the copyright to Owl City's first two studio works, Of June and Maybe I'm Dreaming, as well as An Airplane Carried Me to Bed, an album of Young's pre-Owl City work that Universal Republic published.

Cinematic was not released on CD until August 15, 2022.

== Promotion ==
The Cinematic North American and Asian tours occurred respectively from September 13, 2018, to October 14, 2018, and from November 7, 2018, to November 24, 2018.

== Critical reception ==
Professional ratings
Review scores
| Source | Rating |
|---|---|
| CCM Magazine | 3/5 stars |
| Cross Rhythms | 9/10 squares |
| Jesus Freak Hideout | 3/5 stars |
| Sputnikmusic | 2/5 |

Cinematic was generally received with positive reviews. Matt Conner of CCM Magazine stated, "If you're already a fan of Owl City's easygoing synthpop structures, you'll find lots to like here." He highlights "The 5th of July", "Lucid Dream", "New York City" and "Always" as the standout tracks. Tony Cummings of Cross Rhythms stated that "All My Friends" has "a bit of Ed Sheeran in its structure and sound." He also described "Lucid Dream" as "the most EDM-sounding track on the album, and with some clever lyrics." Christopher Smith of Jesus Freak Hideout remarked, "Many tracks start and end without leaving a lasting impression, but nonetheless put you in a good mood due to the cheerful synth pop soundscapes and optimistic lyrics." He described the tracks "Fiji Water", "Lucid Dream" and "Firebird" as pleasant songs to listen to. He also called "House Wren" as the standout track on the album "that displays Young's strengths as a composer and songwriter." Sameen Amer of The News International gave a mixed review for the album stating, "Cinematic, continues in search of another irresistible banger but falls fairly short as he treads familiar grounds on this overlong set. He criticized the lyrics on songs such as "Not All Heroes Wear Capes" and "Winners Never Quit" describing them as "clichéd." However, he praised the song "House Wren" for its "twinkling beat and bird sounds" that will, "generate smiles on some faces."

== Commercial performance ==
Cinematic debuted on the Billboard 200 at number 115. Additionally, the album peaked at number 25 on the Australian Digital Albums chart and number five on the New Zealand Heatseeker Albums chart. On June 4, 2018, the Official Charts Company released their midweek chart predictions, and placed Cinematic at debuting at number 100 on the UK Official Albums Chart Top 100. The album ultimately peaked at number 34 on the UK Album Downloads Chart.

== Track listing ==
All tracks are written by Adam Young.

Cinematic
| No. | Title | Length |
|---|---|---|
| 1. | "Fiji Water" | 4:20 |
| 2. | "The 5th of July" | 4:11 |
| 3. | "All My Friends" | 3:25 |
| 4. | "House Wren" | 3:30 |
| 5. | "Not All Heroes Wear Capes" | 3:46 |
| 6. | "Montana" | 4:06 |
| 7. | "Lucid Dream" | 4:21 |
| 8. | "Always" | 4:38 |
| 9. | "Cloud Nine" | 3:52 |
| 10. | "Winners Never Quit" | 3:39 |
| 11. | "Madeline Island" | 4:36 |
| 12. | "Be Brave" | 5:15 |
| 13. | "New York City" | 3:44 |
| 14. | "Firebird" | 3:59 |
| 15. | "Cinematic" | 4:13 |
| 16. | "All My Friends" (alternative version) | 3:28 |
| 17. | "Montana" (alternative version) | 3:49 |
| 18. | "Firebird" (alternative version) | 4:30 |
| Total length: | | 73:22 |

== Charts ==
Chart performance for Cinematic
| Chart (2018) | Peak position |
|---|---|
| Australian Digital Albums (ARIA) | 25 |
| Japanese Hot Albums (Billboard Japan) | 46 |
| New Zealand Heatseeker Albums (RMNZ) | 5 |
| UK Album Downloads (OCC) | 34 |
| UK Independent Albums (OCC) | 26 |
| US Billboard 200 | 115 |
| US Independent Albums (Billboard) | 8 |

== Release history ==
| Region | Date | Format | Label | Ref. |
|---|---|---|---|---|
| Various | June 1, 2018 | Digital download; vinyl | Sky Harbor | |
| Various | August 15, 2022 | CD | Sky Harbor | |
