= New York City (Owl City song) =

Single by Owl City

from the album Cinematic
- Released: March 9, 2018
- Studio: Sky Harbor Studios
- Length: 3:44
- Label: Sky Harbor
- Songwriter: Adam Young
- Producer: Young

Owl City singles chronology
"Lucid Dream" (2018)	"New York City" (2018)	"Up to the Cloud" (2022)

Music video
- "New York City" on YouTube

"New York City" is a song by American electronica act Owl City. It was released from his sixth studio album, Cinematic on March 9, 2018, as the fourth and final single.

== Background and release ==
"New York City" was released as the lead single for Reel 3 on March 9, 2018, with the reel following on April 6. In addition to "New York City," the EP included "Cloud Nine" and "Be Brave". A remix to the song was released on September 10, 2018, by itsRGA after winning first place of Owl City's SKIO Remix Contest.

== Composition ==
"New York City" was written and produced by Adam Young. The track runs at 170 BPM and is in the key of B major. The song recounts his trip in the city, spending time with his friends, listening to Johnny Cash and showering at a truck stop.

"'New York City' is about the first time I ever really left my hometown and saw some of the world. It's a coming of age story, and I tried my best to memorize all the little details as they happened. I hope this song inspires you to take a similar trip, maybe even get a little lost. I think you'll be surprised at what you discover."

== Critical reception ==
"New York City" was met with positive reviews from music critics. In a review of Cinematic for CCM Magazine, writer Matt Conner noted it as a favourite from the album, describing the track as "propulsive." Lauren Carlton of The Columbia Chronicle compared the track to his 2009 hit, "Fireflies".

== Music video ==
The music video for "New York City" premiered via VEVO on March 22, 2018, and was directed by Max Haben. The video continues the storyline seen in previous music videos for "All My Friends" and Lucid Dream", featuring a young couple exploring New York City. The couple is played by James Ross Kilmeade and Katy Schuele.

== Track listing ==
Digital download
No.	Title	Length
1.	"New York City"	3:44

Remix version
No.	Title	Length
1.	"New York City" (itsRGA remix)	3:20

== Charts ==
=== Weekly charts ===
Weekly chart performance for "New York City"
Chart (2018)	Peak position
UK Christian Songs (Cross Rhythms)	6

=== Year-end charts ===
Year-end chart performance for "New York City"
Chart (2018)	Position
UK Christian Songs (Cross Rhythms)	44

== Release history ==
Release history for "New York City"
Region	Date	Format	Label	Ref.
Various	March 9, 2018	Digital download	Sky Harbor	
