= My Everything =

My Everything may refer to:

- My Everything (Anita Baker album), 2004
- My Everything (Ariana Grande album), 2014, or its title song
- My Everything, a 2002 album by Helen Baylor
- "My Everything" (98 Degrees song), 2000
- "My Everything" (The Grace song), 2006
- "My Everything" (Owl City song), 2015
- "My Everything", a 2004 song by Goldfinger from Disconnection Notice
- "My Everything" a 2004 song by Raptile featuring Wayne Wonder
- "My Everything", a 2006 song by Monica from The Makings of Me
- "My Everything", a song by Jennifer Brown from Giving You the Best

== See also ==
- "You're the First, the Last, My Everything", a 1974 song by Barry White
