= Sparks (EP) =

EP by Breanne Düren
- Released: May 3, 2011
- Recorded: November 2010
- Studio: Brown Owl Studios, Nashville, Tennessee; Skyline Studios; Pinewood Studios; Glenwood Place Studios, Burbank, California
- Genre: Pop
- Length: 16:58
- Label: Dürendüren Records
- Producer: Mike Daly

Breanne Düren chronology
Breanne Düren (2008)	Sparks (2011)	Gem (2015)

Singles from Sparks
- 1. "Gold Mine" Released: May 2, 2011

Sparks is the first extended play by American pop musician Breanne Düren, released on May 3, 2011. The EP was made available for streaming a day earlier on Teen Vogue. The EP's lead single "Gold Mine", was released on May 2, 2011.

== Background and recording ==
Recording for Sparks began in November 2010 in Los Angeles, California. The EP was produced by Mike Daly. While on the road touring for Owl City, Düren began writing the 5-track EP. Düren stated that the EP, "speaks to the innocence and awe of finding herself doing the very thing she's wanted to do for most of her life: play music." She described the EP as "poppy with a little but of an indie sensibility."

== Release ==
A music video for "Gold Mine" was released on April 29, 2011. The music video features dancing and choreography by Düren and the Apple Valley Avaires. It was directed by Brandon Boulay. The song was officially released as the EP's lead single on May 2, 2011 via iTunes. According to Düren the song is about how she was "at a place in her life where she had many questions" and was "finding out a lot about herself." A music video for "No One Else" was released on June 23, 2011, and was also directed by Brandon Boulay. Düren stated that the song is about being on the road but missing her loved ones at home. On May 20, 2011, a release party took place in her hometown Minneapolis, Minnesota for the EP.

== Critical reception ==
Professional ratings
Review scores
Source	Rating
Artistdirect	5/5 stars
PopMatters	3/10 stars

Sparks was met with generally positive reviews from music critics. Rick Florino of Artistdirect gave a positive review stating that the EP is "inviting, incomparable, and infectious pop that's as magical as it is magnificent" and called the album, "the perfect summer pop album." He also added that Düren channels "the sunnier side of Fiona Apple" on the second track "No One Else". Scott Fryberger of Jesus Freak Hideout stated that the first track "Gold Mine", "gives off an Adele/Duffy-style Brit pop vibe" and called the track a good opening song. He described "No One Else" as a song that focuses on some electronic elements. He ended off stating that the EP is fun and addicting. Alternative Press stated, "there's something to Düren's voice that makes this damn near palatable. There's an earthiness that she tries to hide with coy cooing and cutesy dimpled smiles. If some savvy producer could pull that out of her, we might have something to tweet about. Until then, leave this record to the tweens, multi-colored gossip mavens and hip, Christian pop stars of the world." A negative review from David Maine of PopMatters stated, "there's nothing here compelling enough to convince anyone to take off that other record – whichever one you've got." However, he praised "Gold Mine" for its catchiness.

== Track listing ==
All tracks are written by Breanne Düren and Mike Daly.

No.	Title	Length
1.	"Gold Mine"	3:27
2.	"No One Else"	2:58
3.	"Catapult"	3:39
4.	"Daydreams"	3:08
5.	"Summer Days"	3:43
Total length:		16:58

== Personnel ==
Musicians

- Breanne Düren – vocals, guitar, percussion, keyboards, composer, lyricist

Additional musicians

- Céleigh Chapman – backing vocals
- Aslyn – background vocals
- Hannah Schroeder – cello
- Laura Musten – violin
- Frank Coglitore – bass guitar
- Craig Macintyre – drums, percussion
- Izaac Burkhart – guitar, percussion
- Mike Daly – guitar, percussion, keyboards, composer, lyricist

Additional personnel

- Travis Huff – engineering, mixing
- Izaac Burkhart – additional engineering, additional production
- Konrad Snyder – additional engineering
- Mike Daly – additional engineering, producer
- Lyttleton Carter – assistant engineering
- Chad Carlisle – assistant engineering
- Mike Getches – assistant engineering
- Collin Hughes – photography
- Steve Bursky – executive producer
- Troy Glessner – mastering

== Charts ==
Chart performance for Sparks
Chart (2011)	Peak position
US Heatseekers Albums (Billboard)	5
