= Verge (song) =

Single by Owl City featuring Aloe Blacc

from the album Mobile Orchestra
- Released: May 14, 2015
- Recorded: 2014–2015
- Genre: Synth-pop; electropop; dance-pop; EDM
- Length: 3:33
- Label: Republic
- Songwriters: Aloe Blacc; Adam Young; Matt Thiessen; Emily Wright
- Producer: Adam Young

Owl City singles chronology
"Tokyo" (2014)	"Verge" (2015)	"My Everything" (2015)

Aloe Blacc singles chronology
"Something to Believe In" (2015)	"Verge" (2015)	"Candyman" (2016)

"Verge" is a song by American electronica project Owl City from his fifth studio album Mobile Orchestra. It features guest vocals from American singer Aloe Blacc and was released on May 14, 2015, as the lead single from the album.

== Background ==
After the song was previewed on ESPN's Draft Academy on May 5, it was announced that "Verge", featuring Aloe Blacc would be released on May 14, as the album's first single. A lyric video of "Verge" was later published on Owl City's VEVO channel on YouTube on May 13, 2015.

In an interview with Yahoo Music!, Young explained the meaning of the song; "When I wrote 'Verge' I wanted to capture that moment everyone experiences, that one event in life that signifies the end of an era followed by a new beginning." He also called the collaboration with Blacc an "honor" and his contribution on the track, "invaluable."

== Composition ==
"Verge" was written by Aloe Blacc, Adam Young, Matt Thiessen and Emily Wright, while Young handled production. Young stated he had written the song before sending it to Blacc and that he helped make the song "a lot better." According to the sheet music published at Musicnotes.com, by Alfred Music Publishing, the track runs at 128 BPM and is in the key of D major. The vocal range in the song spans from the notes B3 to A5.

On Owl City's official website, "Verge" is stated as "...his bright, buoyant production and shimmering vocals with a booming soulful refrain from Aloe Blacc. It blurs the lines between electro, alternative, pop, and R&B all at once, while remaining perfect for the dance floor." It is one of the songs he is most proud of, describing the track as "different" but keeping the same elements that made him "unique."

== Release and promotion ==
Owl City released Verge: The Remixes on September 11, 2015. The three-track EP featured remixes of "Verge" by Tom Swoon, Low Steppa, and Transcode. American production duo Halogen also released their own remix to the song on September 9.

== Reception ==
Amy Sciarretto of Artistdirect praised the track's beats, harmonies and falsetto, and added "Owl City knows how to craft pop songs that embed themselves in our brains for days."

== Chart performance ==
"Verge" has done particularly well in Japan, debuting at number 67 on the Japan Hot 100. It reached number 44 on the Japan Hot 100 chart and number three on the Billboard Twitter Real-Time Chart. The song also peaked at number 93 on the South Korea International Chart.

== Music video ==
On May 28, the music video premiered on Yahoo Music! and was made available on VEVO and YouTube the next day. According to Young, the original concept for "Verge" was supposed to be a theme of a wedding, before Blacc suggested a theme of graduating school.

== Track listing ==
Digital download
No.	Title	Length
1.	"Verge"	3:33

The Remixes
No.	Title	Length
1.	"Verge" (Low Steppa's 97 Remix)	5:13
2.	"Verge" (Tom Swoon Remix)	4:16
3.	"Verge" (Transcode Remix)	4:16

== Charts ==
=== Weekly charts ===
Weekly chart performance for "Verge"
Chart (2015)	Peak position
CIS Airplay (TopHit)	21
Czech Republic Singles Digital (ČNS IFPI)	71
Japan (Japan Hot 100)	44
Russia Airplay (TopHit)	19
South Korea International Chart (GAON)	93
Ukraine Airplay (TopHit)	144
US Christian Rock Songs (Billboard)	18

=== Year-end charts ===
Year-end chart performance for "Verge"
Chart (2015)	Position
CIS Airplay (TopHit)	158
Japan Radio Songs (Billboard Japan)	90
Russia Airplay (TopHit)	156
