= All My Friends (Owl City song) =

Single by Owl City

from the album Cinematic
- Released: November 3, 2017
- Studio: Sky Harbor Studios
- Length: 3:25
- Label: Sky Harbor
- Songwriters: Adam Young; Matthew Thiessen; Emily Wright
- Producer: Young

Owl City singles chronology
"Not All Heroes Wear Capes" (2017)	"All My Friends" (2017)	"Lucid Dream" (2018)

Music video
- "All My Friends" on YouTube

"All My Friends" is a song by American electronica act Owl City. It was released on November 3, 2017, as the second single from his sixth studio album, Cinematic.

== Background ==
On November 1, 2017, Owl City announced the release date for his sixth studio album, Cinematic. Along with this announcement, he would release three separate Reels with "All My Friends" being released on November 3, as the lead single from his EP, Reel 1. An alternative version of the song was released on the album with Breanne Düren on vocals.

== Composition ==
"All My Friends" was written and produced by Adam Young. It was also co-written by Matthew Thiessen and Emily Wright. Young, who is a fan of country music and had been listening to Jake Owen and Brad Paisley, said the song was inspired by the story-driven approach from that genre. He stated that the song is about, "those rare friendships that you never forget." The song builds from acoustic guitars and is accompanied by a gang vocal chant, as well as some rapping from Owl City.

"At the time of writing, I was remembering a bunch of my friends from junior high and high school. I was so overwhelmed and thankful they were in my life. I'm still close with some of them, and I've grown apart from others. Still, they stick with me. It's my way of saying, 'Hey, thank you for being there. I probably wouldn’t have turned out the way I did without the positive impact you had on me'."

== Critical reception ==
"All My Friends" was met with mixed reviews from music critics. In a review of Cinematic for Jesus Freak Hideout, writer Christopher Smith stated that the track was a significant set back for the album. However, Tony Cummings of Cross Rhythms compared the track to Ed Sheeran for its "structure and sound" that would "sound great on the airwaves." Lauren Carlton of The Columbia Chronicle described it as "a feel-good anthem with a guitar and simple drum beat."

== Music video ==
The music video for "All My Friends" was released on November 13, 2017. Directed by Max Haben, it was shot at Rochester Lourdes High School, which can be seen at the opening of the video.

== Track listing ==
Digital download
No.	Title	Length
1.	"All My Friends"	3:25

Alternative version
No.	Title	Length
1.	"All My Friends" (alternate version)	3:28

== Personnel ==
Recording

- Owl City's vocals recorded at Sky Harbor Studios, Owatonna, Minnesota, United States

Personnel

- Adam Young – songwriter, producer, recording, instruments, vocals
- Matthew Thiessen – songwriter
- Emily Wright – songwriter

== Charts ==
Chart performance for "All My Friends"
Chart (2018)	Peak position
UK Christian Songs (Cross Rhythms)	10

== Release history ==
Release history for "All My Friends"
Region	Date	Format	Label	Ref.
Various	November 3, 2017	Digital download	Sky Harbor	
