= Lucid Dream (Owl City song) =

Single by Owl City

from the album Cinematic
- Released: January 12, 2018
- Studio: Sky Harbor Studios
- Genre: EDM
- Length: 4:21
- Label: Sky Harbor
- Songwriter: Adam Young
- Producer: Young

Owl City singles chronology
"All My Friends" (2017)	"Lucid Dream" (2018)	"New York City" (2018)

Music video
- "Lucid Dream" on YouTube

"Lucid Dream" is a song by American electronica act Owl City. It was released on January 12, 2018, as the third single from his sixth studio album, Cinematic. The song was also released as the lead single from his Reel 2 EP. The song was released independently via Sky Harbor.

== Background and composition ==
"Lucid Dream" was written and produced by Adam Young. The track runs at 128 BPM and is in the key of C minor. The song has been described as the "most EDM-sounding track" on the album. In an interview with Songwriter Universe, Young stated that the song was based upon a strange dream he had while writing the album.

"I kept a dream journal next to my bed and would often jot down things I remembered upon waking. After several months, most of the journal consisted of bits and pieces of imagery, but one night I had the most vivid dream where I was able to fly. The moment I woke up, I wrote down everything that happened and the song was more or less written. I've not experienced a dream quite like it before so I'm glad I was able to document it and put it into a song."

== Release ==
"Lucid Dream" was released on January 12, 2018, as the lead single from his Reel 2 EP. It was also included on Cinematic as the album's third single. Additionally, a remix to the song was released on September 10, 2018, by Adam Awake after winning first place of Owl City's SKIO Remix Contest.

== Music video ==
The music video for "Lucid Dream" premiered on January 25, 2018, and was directed by Max Haben.

== Track listing ==
Digital download
No.	Title	Length
1.	"Lucid Dream"	4:21

Remix version
No.	Title	Length
1.	"Lucid Dream" (Adam Awake remix)	4:32

== Charts ==
=== Weekly charts ===
Weekly chart performance for "Lucid Dream"
Chart (2018)	Peak position
UK Christian Songs (Cross Rhythms)	3
US Christian Rock Songs (Billboard)	19

=== Year-end charts ===
Year-end chart performance for "Lucid Dream"
Chart (2018)	Peak position
UK Christian Songs (Cross Rhythms)	69

== Release history ==
Release history for "Lucid Dream"
Region	Date	Format	Label	Ref.
Various	January 12, 2018	Digital download	Sky Harbor	
