= Windsor Airlift =

American ambient post-rock band

- Origin: Owatonna, Minnesota, United States
- Genres: Ambient; post-rock; instrumental rock; Electronic; pop punk (early); math rock (early)
- Years active: 2001–present
- Members: Andy Johnson; Tony Johnson
- Past members: Adam Young; Michael DeMars

Windsor Airlift is an American ambient post-rock band formed by brothers Andy Johnson and Tony Johnson, and Adam Young. The band, to date, has released eight studio albums, eight extended plays, one live album, and six singles.

== History ==
The band was formed in Owatonna, Minnesota, and started out as Left Lane in 2001. Adam Young had met Andy Johnson when they were both in elementary school and began making music. Andy used his uncle's Washburn electric guitar, which he hasn't stopped using since, while his brother Tony had picked up the bass guitar. They had a drum set, which Young would use every time he joined the Johnsons at their house. The group wrote parody songs and recorded them on a PC mic, as well as selling their CDs from their lockers. In fall of 2002, the band regrouped as Windsor Airlift. On April 25th, 2003, they released their first EP, The Basement EP, as well as played their very first show. Between the release of The Basement EP and mid-2003, they played at several shows including Sunshine Festival, Bethel Church, and Ironwood Springs. The group also performed shows at local churches and while they were in high school.

After playing at Steele County's Battle of the Bands in 2003, the band made a major change in genre direction. Abandoning nearly every aspect of pop/punk, they began writing music influenced by Unwed Sailor, and quickly released Selections for a Fallen Soldier. During late 2003, the band began work on Selections for a Fallen Soldier, Vol. II, while performing at events on the weekends. Selections for a Fallen Soldier, Vol. II, was released in 2004. The band also began creating short films to be played with their songs on old televisions at their concerts. They released their album, Moonfish Parachutist in 2004. In early 2005, the band released a four-song EP, Hotels. Along with the release of the EP, they also released the album, Qiu!. Many of these albums were recorded in Young's basement. Throughout 2005 and 2006, they continued to play at shows and write music with an additional member, and long-time friend to the group, Michael DeMars. In late 2006, the band released Ocean City Park. Young and Andy collaborated on a project via the internet, and released the EP, Beneath The Crystal Waves.

In 2007, the band slowed down as Young's electronic project, Owl City, began to rise in popularity. In 2009, Young departed the group to focus on Owl City. Before his departure, the group released the EP, We Rule!. In October 2010, Windsor Airlift released the album Flight. Some unreleased recording bits the band did before Adam Young's departure were merged into the album as well. Around the same time of the album's release, the group decided to release a compilation album that contained the EPs, Ocean City Park and Beneath The Crystal Waves.

On December 22, 2011, Windsor Airlift started an album art contest for an upcoming album entitled The Meadow. On January 20, 2012, the album was officially released. Tony Johnson stated that the idea for The Meadow, started in June 2010. Some songs from the album were written for Tony Johnson's then fiance Emily Jane, most notably the track, "Snowfall". The group described The Meadow as an album that, "follows its characters through long, toilsome journeys, optimistic summers days, and inevitable storms." In April 2012, the band performed four shows to raise money for the Clean Water Movement. On April 28, Windsor Airlift returned to its origin home of Owatonna, Minnesota for a homecoming concert, performing alongside Cabin of Love and Carinthia. Former touring member, Michael DeMars joined them on the stage for the concert. They also played a show with Carinthia and Swimming With Dolphins at the Varsity Theater in Minneapolis, Minnesota in the neighborhood of Dinkytown. Shortly after, on May 25, the band released a live album titled, Live at the Varsity Theater, which was recorded during the concert.

On May 30, 2013, the group revealed that they were working on a new album titled: Moonfish Parachutist 2. Along with this announcement, a music video for a song on the album called "Silhouette Harbor" was released. However, in September 2013, Windsor Airlift revealed that they were raising money to create physical CD formats of another album: Music. They also had an album artwork contest. The album was released on September 23, 2013. The album peaked at number 84 on the iTunes Electronic Albums chart. The band also released a three-song EP entitled The Forest Sings to Distant Shores, that same month. On December 31, the band released a single called "December".

On April 6, 2014, the band released a small snippet to a track they were working on, via Instagram which later was revealed to be titled, "Beginnings". On August 10, Windsor Airlift re-released their second album, Moonfish Parachutist for free download via DropBox. On August 30, the group performed a show at the Vaudeville Mews in Des Moines, Iowa alongside Unwed Sailor. On December 3, the band released an eight-track Christmas album, Songs for Christmas.

On April 15, 2015, Windsor Airlift released a two-song EP, From the Archives. On March 14, 2016, they released The Moon's House. In the following years, the group released a handful of singles, with their latest, "Into the Woods" in January 2022.

== Members ==
Current members

- Andy Johnson – guitar, laptop, keyboard, drums (2002–present)
- Tony Johnson – bass (2002–present)

Former members

- Adam Young – drums (2002–2009)
- Michael DeMars – guitar (2004–2005)

Touring musicians

- Emily Johnson – keyboard (2012–2013)
- Scott Gratton – guitar (2012–2013)
- Daniel Johnson – drums (2012–2013)
- Daniel Jorgensen – drums, keyboard (2014)

== Musical style and influence ==
Windsor Airlift brings a mixture of guitar, bass, piano, electronic keyboard, synthesizers, and drums. Since the band is instrumentally-based, they have no vocals (though some of their songs do have snippets from movies or famous speeches). This has given the band their signature, as they play with their backs turned to the audience in an attempt to take the attention off themselves and onto the music.

When the group first started and was originally a pop punk band, they were influenced by Christian bands such as Relient K, Philmore, and Ace Troubleshooter. The band's current ambient post-rock musical style is heavily drawn off Unwed Sailor. The group is also influenced by their Christian faith and worldview. An example of this is the song "Owl" (which features some audio snippets from the film Cast Away) off their 2005 EP, Hotels.

"We are an instrumental post rock band. We love Jesus Christ. We love music. We love you." – Windsor Airlift

Tony Johnson stated in a Windsor Airlift documentary that in the early years, when the band need inspiration, they used to smash things. This, in turn, explains the multiple YouTube videos the band has posted of them throwing and wrecking old television sets and speakers.

== Discography ==
=== Studio albums ===
List of studio albums with selected details
Title	Details
Selections for a Fallen Soldier	Released: 2003; Label: Self-released; Formats: CD
Moonfish Parachutist	Released: 2004; Label: Self-released; Formats: CD
Qui!	Released: 2005; Label: Self-released; Formats: CD
Flight	Released: October 30, 2010; Label: Stairwell Studios; Formats: CD, digital download, streaming
The Meadow	Released: January 20, 2012; Label: Windsor Airlift Music; Formats: CD, digital download, streaming
Music	Released: September 23, 2013; Label: Windsor Airlift Music; Formats: CD, digital download, streaming
Songs for Christmas	Released: December 3, 2014; Label: Self-released; Formats: Digital download, streaming
The Moon's House	Released: March 14, 2016; Label: Windsor Airlift Music; Formats: CD, digital download, streaming

=== Compilation albums ===
List of compilation albums with selected details
Title	Details
Ocean City Park and Beneath the Crystal Waves	Released: October 2010; Label: Windsor Airlift Music; Formats: Digital download

=== Live albums ===
List of live albums with selected details
Title	Details
Live at the Varsity Theater	Released: May 25, 2012; Label: Windsor Airlift Music; Formats: Digital download, streaming

=== Extended plays ===
List of extended plays with selected details
Title	Details
The Basement	Released: 2003; Label: Self-released; Formats: CD
Selections for a Fallen Soldier Vol. 2	Released: 2004; Label: Self-released; Formats: CD, digital download, streaming
Hotels! (Note: Release date on their Bandcamp page is stated as 2007-10-15, though this conflicts with most other sources.)	Released: 2005; Label: Self-released; Formats: CD, digital download, streaming
Ocean City Park (Note: Release date on their Bandcamp page is stated as 2013-09-21, though this conflicts with most other sources and can't be correct, as Adam Young is credited on this EP, yet he left the band in 2009.)	Released: 2006; Label: Self-released; Formats: CD, digital download, streaming
Beneath the Crystal Waves	Released: June 13, 2008; Label: Self-released; Formats: CD, digital download, streaming
We Rule!	Released: 2009; Label: Self-released; Formats: CD
The Forest Sings to Distant Shores	Released: September 22, 2013; Label: Self-released; Formats: Digital download, streaming
From the Archives	Released: April 15, 2015; Label: Self-released; Formats: Digital download, streaming

Unreleased

- Moonfish Parachutist 2 (Currently cancelled)

=== Singles ===
Title	Year	Album
"December"	2013	Non-album singles
"Dream"	2015	Non-album singles
"Midnight Snowfall"	2015	Non-album singles
"Winters in The Midwest"	2017	Non-album singles
"Thankfulness"	2019	Non-album singles
"Your Best Day Ever"	2020	Non-album singles
"Into the Woods"	2022	Non-album singles

Other Songs

- White Shores (Unknown)
- Seaboards (2008)
- Camera Blizzard (2010)
- Basketball Abridged (Unknown)
- You Mess with Kurt and You Go in the Grinder (Unknown)
- I Am Hercules (Unknown)
- Hallogen (2010)

== Other projects ==
The Atlantic/Glacier Island

In 2004, Andy Johnson, Tony Johnson, and Adam Young created an electronic project called The Atlantic. They released a few songs before the band went dormant for a number of years.

In 2010, Andy and Tony Johnson resurrected and reformed the project under the name Glacier Island. Since then, the group has released two studio albums entitled From Pelican Shores (2010) and The Campfire Lullabies (2012). Both albums were released on August 16, exactly two years apart.

Glacier Island's song "Boat" (off From Pelican Shores) echos back to the track "Boat" from Windsor Airlift's first release, The Basement EP, with a totally different sound and genre.

On May 2, 2013, an official music video for the song "Nostalgia" (off The Campfire Lullabies) was released via YouTube.

On May 10, 2013, Glacier Island played a show at Wooly's in Des Moines, Iowa. For this show, vocals were performed by Andy Johnson. Live footage from the show was published to YouTube by Johnson over the next few days.

On June 1, 2018, Glacier Island released a new single entitled, "Arrows". This coincided with the release of Owl City's album Cinematic.

The Perfect Theory

In 2006, Andy Johnson and Tony Johnson created a side project entitled The Perfect Theory. A good deal of the songs produced, centered around Waldorf College, the school that Andy and Anthony Johnson attended. Adam Young was featured in the project's songs "Prom Night" and "Without You Baby". The project ran until 2009.

Dolphin Park

In 2007, Andy Johnson, Tony Johnson, and Adam Young created the ambient instrumental project, Dolphin Park. The project released four songs which were later re-released as Windsor Airlift's 2008 EP, Beneath The Crystal Waves. Windsor Airlift's recurring song, "The Theme for Moonglow", also originated from the project.

Other

Andy Johnson, Tony Johnson, and Adam Young also did many more side projects throughout 2005 to 2007.

In 2007, Andy and Tony Johnson created a minor one-song project entitled Casey's Pizza. The project's genre was intentionally bad rap.

In early 2012, Andy Johnson released a solo worship album entitled Love Songs.

In late 2012, Andy Johnson created the project entitled Lantern Music. The goal of the project is to make Bible memorization easier and more fun for children.

From time to time, Andy Johnson will do a cover of an Owl City song.
