= Unbelievable (Owl City song) =

Single by Owl City featuring Hanson

from the album Mobile Orchestra
- Released: June 26, 2015
- Studio: Sky Harbor Studios, Owatonna, Minnesota; The Terrarium (Minneapolis, MN)
- Genre: Pop
- Length: 3:13
- Label: Republic
- Songwriters: Adam Young; Isaac Hanson; Matthew Thiessen; Emily Wright
- Producer: Young

Owl City singles chronology
"My Everything" (2015)	"Unbelievable" (2015)	"Not All Heroes Wear Capes" (2017)

Hanson singles chronology
"Finally It's Christmas" (2014)	"Unbelievable" (2015)	"Top of the World" (2015)

Music video
- "Unbelievable" on YouTube

"Unbelievable" is a song by American electronica project Owl City. The song was released on June 26, 2015 as the third and final single from his fifth studio album, Mobile Orchestra. The track features American pop rock band Hanson.

== Background and composition ==
"Unbelievable" was written by Adam Young, Isaac Hanson, Matthew Thiessen and Emily Wright while production was handled by Young. Young stated that working with Hanson was a "total dream collaboration." He also called the group the "nicest" and "easiest guys to work with."

"I just reached out to them, sent them the song, introduced myself and said I'd be thrilled to work with them if they might find the idea appealing at all. They wrote back and said they were down to do it. They wrote Verse 2, added some additional production and just kind of did what felt natural to them, all of which I loved."

The track runs at 118 BPM and is in the key of D-sharp major. The song is a nostalgic track with influences of a 90's pop sound and features pop culture references such as Nintendo and The Fresh Prince of Bel-Air among many more.

Owl City and Hanson performed the song on The Today Show on July 14, 2015.

== Critical reception ==
Kelsie Gibson of Bustle stated, "From Owl City's pure pop sound to Hanson's amazing vocals, this song has me hoping this is just the beginning of more '90s revivals."

== Music video ==
An animated music video for the song was released on June 29, 2015. The video was directed by Ryan Maloney and features a walking VHS tape strolling down a paved sidewalk while whistling to the song. The video also showcases the musicians in animated form, performing the track.

== Personnel ==
Credits for "Unbelievable" adapted from album's liner notes.

Owl City

- Adam Young – vocals, composer

Additional musicians

- Hanson – featured artist

Production

- Adam Young – producer
- Isaac Hanson – composer
- Matthew Thiessen – composer
- Emily Wright – composer
- Ted Jensen – mastering engineer
- Robert Orton – mixing engineer

== Charts ==
=== Weekly charts ===
Weekly chart performance for "Unbelievable"
Chart (2015)	Peak position
South Korea International Chart (GAON)	47
Taiwan (Hito Radio)	3
US Hot Christian Songs (Billboard)	20

== Release history ==
Release dates and formats for "Unbelievable"
Region	Date	Format	Label	Ref.
Various	June 26, 2015	Digital download; streaming	Republic	
