= Ready to Fly =

Ready to Fly may refer to:

- Ready to Fly (radio control), radio-controlled airplanes or helicopters that are supplied fully built

== Film ==
- Ready to Fly (film), a 2012 documentary film on women's ski jumping

== Music ==
- Ready to Fly (FFH album) (2003)
- Ready to Fly (Jamie Grace album) (2014)
- Ready to Fly (The Verlaines album) (1991)
- "Ready to Fly" (Amy Pearson song), a song by Amy Pearson
- "Ready to Fly", a 2004 song by Richard Marx from My Own Best Enemy
- "Ready to Fly" (Didrick song), a song by Didrick featuring Adam Young of Owl City
- "Ready to Fly" a single by Sub Focus and Dimension (2022)
