= You're Not Alone (Owl City song) =

Promotional single by Owl City featuring Britt Nicole

from the album Mobile Orchestra
- Released: October 7, 2014
- Genre: Dance-pop; electropop
- Length: 3:55
- Label: Republic
- Songwriter: Adam Young
- Producer: Young

"You're Not Alone" is a song by American electronica project Owl City. The song features American vocalist and songwriter Britt Nicole. It was released on October 7, 2014, as a promotional single from his fifth studio album, Mobile Orchestra.

== Background ==
Owl City announced the release date of the song on September 29, 2014, along with another track, "Tokyo". Young stated that the song is about "being alone in a crowd" and that the message is how "we've all been there and you're not the only person to go through that." A lyric video for the track was released on October 8, 2014.

== Composition ==
Written and produced by Young, the track runs at 83 BPM and is in the key of E-flat major. Young's range in the song spans from the notes Eb3 to C5. Unlike his previous songs where he showcases a "traditionally light-hearted and sometimes goofy synth pop" sound, he described "You're Not Alone" as "a bit more weighty" and is based on his personal faith and relationship with God.

According to an interview with Power 88 FM radio, the song was inspired after Young read a news report online about a Sudanese woman, who was sentenced to death for her Christian beliefs, but was later rescued.

Speaking about working with Britt Nicole on the song, he stated;

"I feel like 'You're Not Alone' with Britt Nicole would have been no where as good without her fingerprints all over it. She added something so special to the song that I could have never done had I just sang the whole thing myself. She was so easy to work with."

== Critical reception ==
Professional ratings
Review scores
Source	Rating
Cross Rhythms	10/10 squares

Tony Cummings of Cross Rhythms gave a positive review for the song. He called the collaboration "a brilliant idea" and the track the "perfect pop single." He remarked, "The duo have come up with one of the prettiest mid-tempo tracks."

== Personnel ==
Owl City

- Adam Young – vocals

Additional musicians

- Britt Nicole – additional vocals, featured artist
- Bryan Fowler – guitar
- Jasper Nephew – guitar

Production

- Joshua Crosby – vocal producer
- Bryan Fowler – assistant mixing engineer
- Ted Jensen – mastering engineer
- Jerrico Scroggins – assistant mixing engineer
- Christopher Stevens – mixing, programming

== Charts ==
=== Weekly charts ===
Weekly chart performance for "You're Not Alone"
Chart (2014–15)	Peak position
South Korea BGM (Circle)	78
UK Christian Songs (Cross Rhythms)	10
US Hot Christian Songs (Billboard)	5
US Christian AC (Billboard)	18

=== Year-end charts ===
Year-end chart performance for "You're Not Alone"
Chart (2014)	Position
US Hot Christian Songs (Billboard)	86

Year-end chart performance for "You're Not Alone"
Chart (2015)	Position
US Christian CHR Songs (Billboard)	26
