= Bird with a Broken Wing =

Bird with a Broken Wing may refer to:

- "Bird with a Broken Wing", a 2015 song by Owl City from Mobile Orchestra
- "Bird with a Broken Wing", a 2021 song by Weezer from OK Human
