= Tokyo (Owl City song) =

Single by Owl City featuring Sekai no Owari

from the album Mobile Orchestra
- Released: October 7, 2014
- Length: 3:39
- Label: Republic
- Songwriter: Adam Young
- Producer: Young

Owl City singles chronology
"Beautiful Times" (2014)	"Tokyo" (2014)	"Verge" (2015)

Sekai no Owari singles chronology
"Honō to Mori no Carnival" (2014)	"Tokyo" (2014)	"Dragon Night" (2014)

Music video
- "Tokyo" on YouTube

"Tokyo" is a song by American electronica project Owl City. The song features Japanese pop band Sekai no Owari and was released on October 7, 2014. "Tokyo" was also featured as an exclusive track on the Japanese release of Owl City's fifth studio album, Mobile Orchestra.

== Background ==
Owl City announced the release date for the song on September 29, 2014 along with another track, "You're Not Alone". Speaking about the meaning of the song, Young stated, "'Tokyo' is about the many sleepless nights I've spent in Japan due to jet lag. Something in the atmosphere there is very conducive to creativity." While at a yakitori restaurant, Young asked Fukase of Sekai no Owari if he wanted to sing on the track, which he agreed. The singer and the band were fans of each others music and Young called the collaboration an honor.

== Composition ==
Written and produced by Young, the track runs at 128 BPM and is in the key of E major. He began recording the song in Nashville and during the production of the song, he decided to reach out to Sekai no Owari.

== Music video ==
A visualizer video for "Tokyo" premiered on November 18, 2014. The video contains footage of their performance during the Tokyo Fantasy event which was held and recorded on October 4, 2014 at Fuji-Q Highland in Yamanashi. Young spoke about performing the song live with Sekai no Owari stating, "It felt good. I've never played on such a beautiful stage. Just standing on the stage was so inspiring."

== Credits and personnel ==
Credits adapted from AllMusic and digital liner notes.

- Adam Young – composer, primary artist, producer, recording engineer, mixing
- Sekai no Owari – featured artist
- Jasper Nephew – guitar
- Emily Wright – recording engineer

== Charts ==
=== Weekly charts ===
Weekly chart performance for "Tokyo"
Chart (2014–15)	Peak position
Japan (Japan Hot 100)	25
South Korea International Chart (GAON)	97
UK Christian Songs (Cross Rhythms)	3

=== Year-end charts ===
Year-end chart performance for "Tokyo"
Chart (2015)	Peak position
UK Christian Songs (Cross Rhythms)	92

== Release history ==
Release history for "Tokyo"
Region	Date	Format	Label	Ref.
Various	October 7, 2014	Digital download; streaming	Republic	
