= Flowers of the Field =

Flowers of the Field may refer to:

- "Flowers of the Field", a 2010 song by Sky Sailing from their album An Airplane Carried Me to Bed,
- Flowers of the Field (film), a 2020 Canadian drama film directed by Andrew Stanley.
