= Maybe I'm Dreaming =

Studio album by Owl City
- Released: March 17, 2008
- Recorded: November 2007 – February 2008
- Studio: Sky Harbor (Owatonna, Minnesota)
- Genres: Synth-pop; emo pop; indietronica
- Length: 48:22
- Labels: Sky Harbor; Universal Republic
- Producer: Adam Young

Owl City chronology
Of June (2007)	Maybe I'm Dreaming (2008)	Ocean Eyes (2009)

Alternative cover
- Digital cover

Maybe I'm Dreaming is the debut studio album by American electronica project Owl City, released on March 17, 2008. Despite having been self-released and not recorded by any major producer, it managed to reach the top 20 of the Billboard Dance/Electronic Albums chart.

Following the surprise success of Owl City's second studio album, Ocean Eyes, Maybe I'm Dreaming was pressed and re-released by Universal Republic on April 21, 2009.

== Background and release ==
Maybe I'm Dreaming was recorded throughout the second half of 2007 and early 2008, in the basement of Adam Young's childhood home. Young produced and recorded the album in Owatonna, Minnesota. Speaking about recording the album himself, he recalled, "it's easy to overthink what you do by allowing yourself to become too emotionally invested in what you're doing." Guest musicians on the album include Breanne Düren and Austin Tofte. Düren is featured on multiple songs on the album, most notably on the track, "The Saltwater Room". A friend had suggested that she would be perfect to work with Young. Young used his uncle's 1969 Alvarez guitar on the fourth track, "The Saltwater Room". The seventh track, "The Technicolor Phase", is featured on Alice in Wonderland's compilation album, Almost Alice.

The album was self-released through his record label, Sky Harbor on March 17, 2008. It was released in the United Kingdom and Europe on December 16, through Island Records. Physical copies of the album were pressed and re-released by Universal Republic on April 21, 2009. An official music video for the song "Early Birdie" was filmed in March 2008, by Adam Young's childhood friends/bandmates Andy and Anthony Johnson of Windsor Airlift, and then released on January 13, 2011, via YouTube.

== Critical reception ==
Professional ratings
Review scores
Source	Rating
AllMusic	3.5/5 stars
Jesus Freak Hideout	3.5/5 stars
Melodic	3.5/5 stars
Sputnikmusic	3.5/5

Maybe I'm Dreaming was met with positive reviews from music critics. Anthony Tognazzini of AllMusic praised the album for its "breezy melodies, personal lyrics, and carefully orchestrated folktronica." He also complimented Young's ability to build on "the skills he was developing on Of June" and turn it into a "strong effort" on the album. Kaj Roth of Melodic stated, "If you're in the mood for ambient music, then Maybe I'm Dreaming is surely the right medicine." Will R of Sputnikmusic stated that the album, "soothes the listener with airy, almost ethereal leads and simple acoustic guitar strums over a relaxing bed of synth pads." He also called "Rainbow Veins" the "standout track on the album," praising the synth lead and rhythmic guitar. He also complimented the songs, "The Technicolor Phase" for its melody, and "West Coast Friendship" for its, "chilled-out synths."

== Track listing ==
All tracks are written by Adam Young.

No.	Title	Length
1.	"On the Wing"	5:04
2.	"Rainbow Veins"	4:40
3.	"Super Honeymoon"	3:20
4.	"The Saltwater Room" (featuring Breanne Düren)	4:55
5.	"Early Birdie"	4:15
6.	"Air Traffic"	3:01
7.	"The Technicolor Phase"	4:27
8.	"Sky Diver"	2:44
9.	"Dear Vienna"	3:58
10.	"I'll Meet You There"	4:16
11.	"This Is the Future"	2:53
12.	"West Coast Friendship"	4:06
Total length:		48:22

=== Notes ===
- "On the Wing" and "The Saltwater Room" were included as remastered tracks on his second studio album Ocean Eyes.

== Personnel ==
Credits adapted from album's liner notes.

Owl City

- Adam Young – vocals, keyboards, synthesizers, drums, producer, programming, engineer, audio mixer

Additional musicians and production

- Breanne Düren – additional vocals (1, 4, 6)
- Austin Tofte – additional guitars, additional instrumentation, additional vocals (1, 2, 5)
- Ryan Satt – artwork
- Zach Ogoord – artwork
- Paul Lemke – photography

== Charts ==
Chart performance for Maybe I'm Dreaming
Chart (2009–10)	Peak position
South Korean Albums (Circle)	91
UK Album Downloads (Official Charts)	60
UK Dance Albums (Official Charts)	6
US Top Dance Albums (Billboard)	13

== Release history ==
Release history and formats for Maybe I'm Dreaming
Region	Date	Format	Label	Ref.
United States	March 17, 2008	Digital download	Sky Harbor	
Europe	December 16, 2008	CD; digital download	Sky Harbor; Island	
Various	April 21, 2009	CD	Sky Harbor; Universal Republic	
Various	March 30, 2010	Digital download	Sky Harbor; Universal Republic	

== Notes and miscellanea ==
- On November 24, 2010, Andy Johnson of Windsor Airlift published his cover of "Sky Diver" on YouTube.
