= My Everything (Owl City song) =

Single by Owl City

from the album Mobile Orchestra
- Released: June 5, 2015
- Genre: Christian pop; dance pop
- Length: 3:44
- Label: Republic
- Songwriter: Adam Young
- Producer: Young

Owl City singles chronology
"Verge" (2015)	"My Everything" (2015)	"Unbelievable" (2015)

Music video
- "My Everything" on YouTube

"My Everything" is a song by American electronica project Owl City. The song was released on June 5, 2015, as the second single from his fifth studio album, Mobile Orchestra. The song reached number 22 the US Hot Christian Songs chart.

== Background and composition ==
"My Everything" is about how important Christian faith is to Adam Young and how it is his priority to praise God. He stated:

"I'm a person of faith and I want to make sure that that comes across. My goal isn't to preach but I want to shed light on the fact that my relationship with God is the number one thing in my life."

Furthermore, Young stated that the song is about "running to God when he's filled with fear, when trouble comes and when he's knocked down." Young also hoped that the song can serve as encouragement for those who feel spiritually weary or tired.

Written and produced by Young, the track runs at 90 BPM and is in the key of F major. Young's range in the song spans from the notes C4 to A5.

== Critical reception ==
"My Everything" was received with mixed reviews from music critics. Elise Cleary of Godtube called the track, "very meaningful with the catchy, but not overly done, music." Billboard Japan felt that the song, "showcased British-oriented alternative rock." Kenon Thompson of AXS stated, "The lyrics showcase from any perspective how anyone can view their best friend or significant other. Having such trust in one person is an intimate/important thing and the lyrics in 'My Everything' is exactly what the song is about." However, Chris Deville of Stereogum gave a negative review as he stated that the song is, "everything awful about the Christian music industry."

== Music video ==
The music video for "My Everything" premiered via Relevant on June 5, 2015. The video was directed by Eric Ulbrich and Kylie Eaton. The music video was shot in Los Angeles and showcases Young walking through a forest in a day-and-night cycle. It was composed of just 6 shots being placed accordingly with each section of the song.

== Personnel ==
Musicians

- Adam Young – composer, producer

Production

- Bryan Fowler – assistant mixing engineer
- Jerricho Scroggins – assistant mixing engineer
- Christopher Stevens – mixing
- Ted Jensen – mastering

== Charts ==
Chart performance for "My Everything"
Chart (2015)	Peak position
South Korea International Chart (GAON)	54
US Hot Christian Songs (Billboard)	22
US Christian Hot AC/CHR Songs (Billboard)	9

== Release history ==
Region	Date	Format	Label	Ref.
Various	June 5, 2015	Digital download	Universal Republic Records	
United States	July 31, 2015	Christian contemporary hit radio	Universal Republic Records	
