= Eternity (Paul van Dyk song) =

Single by Paul van Dyk featuring Adam Young
- Released: March 8, 2012
- Genre: Dance pop
- Length: 3:22 (Album Version); 3:10 (radio edit)
- Label: Vandit
- Songwriters: Paul van Dyk; Adam Young
- Producer: van Dyk

Paul van Dyk singles chronology
"Verano" (2012)	"Eternity" (2012)	"The Ocean" (2012)

Adam Young singles chronology
"Angels" (2011)	"Eternity" (2012)	"Shooting Star" (2012)

Music video
- "Eternity" on YouTube

"Eternity" is a song by German DJ Paul van Dyk. It was released on March 8, 2012, as the second single from his sixth studio album, Evolution. The song features American electronica artist Adam Young.

== Background ==
In an interview with Billboard, van Dyk spoke about collaborating with Young; "He's probably one of the most insanely great people I've ever met. We got in contact three or four years ago, before he had a big hit with 'Fireflies'... The first track I sent him, he didn't know what to do with, because it was basically finished. I went back to the studio and wrote another piece of music that had more space for him to do his magic."

== Composition ==
"Eternity" was written by Paul van Dyk and Adam Young, while production was also handled by van Dyk. He composed the track while touring in Greece and Young wrote the lyrics whilst he was touring in Australia. Recording took place in New York City and the final production occurred in Berlin in van Dyk's studio.

== Critical reception ==
"Eternity" was met with positive reviews from music critics. David Greenwald of MTV stated, "The track gets some big-hearted vocals from Owl City's Adam Young, who borrows a page from Coldplay... The blinking four-on-the-floor beat strikes a balance between Young's breathy vocals and dance floor electricity, with the drums dropping out for the chorus before climbing back into the mix for a rave-y explosion." Scott Shetler of PopCrush called the track a "dance song" that complements well with Young's vocals. He also added that Young was a "good fit" for the song. Katie Hasty of Uproxx stated that the song feels inspired by Owl City's hit song "Fireflies".

== Music video ==
The music video for "Eternity" premiered via MTV on March 9, 2012. The video is in a science fiction setting, "zooming through a vintage arcade game into an impressive world of cinematic references."

== Track listing ==
CD single
No.	Title	Length
1.	"Eternity" (UK radio edit)	3:10

Digital download
No.	Title	Length
1.	"Eternity"	5:34

Remixes
No.	Title	Length
1.	"Eternity" (alternative radio mix)	3:22
2.	"Eternity" (Austin Leeds mix)	5:35
3.	"Eternity" (Brian Brainstorm & Psylocyber remix)	5:39
4.	"Eternity" (Gary Proud remix)	7:05
5.	"Eternity" (Giuseppe Ottaviani re-edit)	6:35
6.	"Eternity" (Johan Malmgren remix)	7:09

== Charts ==
Chart performance for "Eternity"
Chart (2012)	Peak position
CIS Airplay (TopHit)	175
Mexico Ingles Airplay (Billboard)	39

== Release history ==
Release dates and formats for "Eternity"
Region	Date	Format	Version	Label	Ref.
United States	March 8, 2012	Dance radio	Original	Vandit	
United Kingdom	November 5, 2012	Digital download	Remixes	3 Beat	
Ireland	November 5, 2012	Digital download	Original	All Around the World	
Germany	November 19, 2012	Digital download	Remixes	Vandit	
United Kingdom	November 26, 2012	CD	Original	3 Beat	
Various	November 26, 2012	Digital download	Original	Vandit	
