= Breanne Düren =

American singer-songwriter (born 1987)

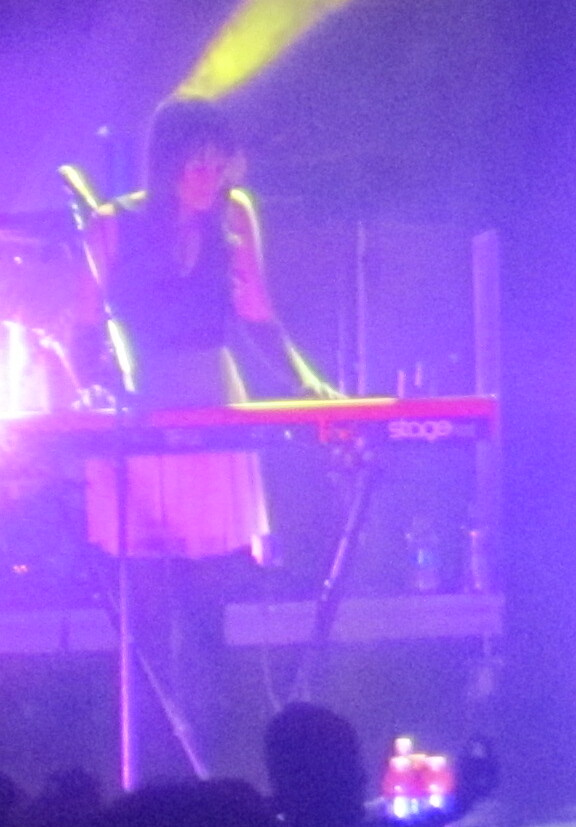
- Düren performing in April 2010

Background information
- Also known as: Breanne Düren
- Born: Breanne Elizabeth Dürenberger; October 9, 1987 (age 38); Minneapolis, Minnesota, U.S.
- Instruments: Keyboards; vocals
- Years active: 2008–present
- Labels: dürendüren
- Website: web.archive.org/web/20190908011400/http://breanneduren.com/

Breanne Elizabeth Dürenberger (born October 9, 1987), known professionally as Breanne Düren, is an American musician best known for her work with electronic music project Owl City and her own solo work.

== Early life ==
Breanne Düren was born on October 9, 1987, to Jill and Louis Dürenberger. She has two sisters, Thuressa Dürenberger and Celesta Bork, and a brother, Caleb Dürenberger. She also has two nieces, Olivia and Isabella. Her father and David Durenberger are cousins.

Düren took vocal lessons as a child. She also took piano and dance lessons. In middle school she began writing her own songs, and by high school she started playing local coffeehouses. She attended Apple Valley High School. Düren also worked as a barista.

== Career ==
=== 2008–2018: Owl City ===
During college, Austin Tofte of Swimming With Dolphins, a band wherein Adam Young of Owl City was previously a member, suggested that Düren would be perfect to work with Young. She is featured in a duet in the songs "The Saltwater Room" (on both Maybe I'm Dreaming and Ocean Eyes), "The Tip Of the Iceberg" (on Ocean Eyes), and "Honey And The Bee" (on All Things Bright and Beautiful). She also sings background vocals in "On The Wing" (on both Maybe I'm Dreaming and Ocean Eyes) and "Air Traffic" (on Maybe I'm Dreaming). She plays the keyboard and provides backing vocals for Owl City on his tours. While touring with Owl City in 2012, Düren filled-in for Carly Rae Jepsen on the live version of "Good Time." She also provided backing vocals in "Silhouettes", the first track of the debut EP Ambient Blue by Swimming with Dolphins. Young claimed that Düren is "like a sister" to him.

Breanne sings background vocals in Jamestown Story's version of "Take Me Home Tonight" by Eddie Money. She also sings background vocals in their song "Summer" from their album Love vs. Life.

=== 2008–Present: Solo career, Sparks and Gem ===
Düren released her debut self-titled album independently on August 8, 2008. Breanne provided additional vocals to Ari Herstand's 2008 record, Whispering Endearments. In 2010, Breanne was featured on the song "Lament" by Robbie Seay Band on their album Miracle. On March 5, 2010, Breanne released a cover song titled "Everlasting Light", originally performed by The Black Keys, via her Twitter account.

Düren wrote the songs on her EP Sparks while on tour and was recorded in November 2010. It was released by her own record label, dürendüren records, on May 3, 2011 and was produced by Mike Daly. Songs included her first single "Gold Mine." Rick Florino of artistdirect gave the EP "5/5 stars."

Released in April 2011, the "Gold Mine" music video features dancing and choreography by Düren and the Apple Valley AVaires. It was directed by Brandon Boulay. Düren has often stated that the song was about how she was "at a place in her life where she had many questions" and was "finding out a lot about herself."

The music video for "No One Else" was released on June 23, 2011, and was also directed by Brandon Boulay. Düren has stated that the song was about being on the road but missing her loved ones at home.

On April 3, 2012, Breanne sang a duet with Minnesota-based singer/songwriter Dustin Hatzenbuhler on the song "The Fight" on his debut album Fall.

On March 2, 2014, Porter Robinson released the lead single from his album Worlds, titled "Sea of Voices". It features uncredited vocals by Breanne. She also has featured vocals on the song "Years of War," from Worlds.

On July 18, 2014, Breanne announced on Twitter that she would be making a new EP, using Indiegogo as a fundraising tool. On September 18, 2015, Breanne released her second EP, Gem on iTunes.

In 2018, Breanne played keyboards and contributed backing vocals for pop band Echosmith's North American headlining tour.

== Discography ==
=== Studio albums ===
Title
Breanne Düren
Album details
- Released August 8, 2008
- Label: Dürendüren Records
- Format: CD
Notes

No.	Title	Length
1.	"Lenses"	2:59
2.	"Black Coffee"	3:20
3.	"Doctor"	3:43
4.	"Warm Water"	5:29
5.	"They Call Me October"	4:05
6.	"After You"	4:11
7.	"No Magic Show"	4:34
8.	"Speak"	5:00
9.	"Who Is To Blame?"	4:29
10.	"Untitled"	5:46
11.	"Steady"	5:27

=== Extended plays ===
List of extended plays, with selected chart positions
Title	Album details	Peak chart positions
Title	Album details	US Heat.
Sparks	Released May 3, 2011; Label: Dürendüren Records; Format: CD, digital download	5
Gem	Released September 18, 2015; Label: Dürendüren Records; Format: CD, digital download	—
"—" denotes releases that did not chart or was not released in that territory.

=== Other appearances ===
Year	Title	Album
2008	"Silhouettes" (Swimming With Dolphins featuring Breanne Düren)	Ambient Blue
2008	"On the Wing" (Owl City featuring Breanne Düren)	Maybe I'm Dreaming; Ocean Eyes
2008	"The Saltwater Room" (Owl City featuring Breanne Düren)	Maybe I'm Dreaming; Ocean Eyes
2008	"Air Traffic" (Owl City featuring Breanne Düren)	Maybe I'm Dreaming
2008	"Summer" (Jamestown Story featuring Breanne Düren)	Love vs. Life
2009	"The Bird and the Worm" (Owl City featuring Breanne Düren)	Ocean Eyes
2009	"Fireflies" (Owl City featuring Breanne Düren)	Ocean Eyes
2009	"Meteor Shower" (Owl City featuring Breanne Düren)	Ocean Eyes
2010	"Lament (We Cannot Wait)" (Robbie Seay Band featuring Breanne Düren)	Miracle
2011	"Honey and the Bee" (Owl City featuring Breanne Düren)	All Things Bright and Beautiful
2011	"Here's to You" (André Rodriguez featuring Breanne Düren)	Somewhere New
2012	"The Flight" (Dustin Hatzenbuhler featuring Breanne Düren)	Fall
2014	"Years of War" (Porter Robinson featuring Breanne Düren & Sean Caskey)	Worlds
2015	"Hearth" (Forenn featuring Breanne Düren & Gatlin Elms)	Forenn
