= Water Colours =

Studio album by Swimming With Dolphins
- Released: May 13, 2011
- Genre: Electronica; synthpop; indietronica
- Length: 38:05
- Label: Tooth & Nail
- Producer: Aaron Sprinkle; Zack Odom; Kenneth Mount

Swimming With Dolphins chronology
Ambient Blue (2008)	Water Colours (2011)

Singles from Water Colours
- 1. "Sleep to Dream" Released: April 26, 2011

Water Colours is the debut studio album by the American electronica band, Swimming With Dolphins. It was released on May 13, 2011 on iTunes and in physical CD format on May 17, 2011. On May 25, 2011, the band released a trailer for the album's release on YouTube.

== Background and release ==
Swimming With Dolphins with Tooth & Nail Records in June 2010. Recording for the album began in the summer of 2010 where it was produced by Aaron Sprinkle in Seattle. The album finished production in Atlanta with help from producers Zack Odom and Kenneth Mount. Sarah Beintker provided additional vocals on the songs "Holiday" and "Sleep to Dream". The album also featured the artists Sunsun and Mod Sun.

The album was set to be released in March 2011 but was pushed two months back. It was officially released on May 17, 2011. "Sleep to Dream" was the first and only single off the album. It was made available on April 26, 2011, a few weeks in advance of the album's debut. On August 5, 2011, Swimming With Dolphins uploaded the official music video for the song, via YouTube. The video was shot along the Northern California Coast side.

== Reception ==
Professional ratings
Review scores
Source	Rating
AllMusic	3/5 stars
Alternative Press	3.5/5 stars
Cross Rhythms	8/10 stars
Jesus Freak Hideout	3.5/5 stars
Louder Than Music	3.5/5 stars
Melodic	2.5/5 stars
New Release Tuesday	4/5 stars
Review Rinse Repeat	4/5 stars

The album received overall positive reviews from multiple professional music sites. Theo Bowyer of Cross Rhythms praised the single "Sleep to Dream" for its "hooky, synth riff" and compared it to Owl City. He also complimented the writing flexibility on the track "Diplomat" that showcases Tofte's mature lyrical approach. William Ruhlmann of AllMusic called the album, "party music." Scott Fryberger of Jesus Freak Hideout called "Holiday" the highlight of album, praising the track for its emotional and thoughtful lyrics. He also added, "The synthpop is fun and reminiscent of the 80s... The lyrics and vocals are pretty good, but mostly find themselves taking a back seat to the music." However, he was criticized the track "Diplomat" for its "unfortunate profane use of 'hell'." A mixed review came from Kaj Roth of Melodic as he stated, "Tofte needs better songs because only a few lift up his debut album Water Colours." He was critical on the tracks such as "Happiness" and "Good Times" calling them "quite boring." However, he praised the tracks "Diplomat" and "Sleep to Dream".

== Accolades ==
Year	Publication	Country	List
2011	Cross Rhythms	United Kingdom	"The 20 Best Albums of 2011"

== Track listing ==
All tracks are written by Austin Tofte.

No.	Title	Length
1.	"Holiday"	3:59
2.	"Easy"	3:37
3.	"Sleep to Dream"	3:28
4.	"Diplomat"	3:28
5.	"Watercolours"	3:15
6.	"Jacques Cousteau"	3:37
7.	"I Was a Lover"	3:34
8.	"Captured"	4:27
9.	"Happiness" (featuring Sunsun)	4:47
10.	"Good Times" (featuring Mod Sun)	3:53
Total length:		38:05

== Personnel ==
Credits for Water Colours adapted from AllMusic.

Swimming With Dolphins

- Austin Tofte – lead vocals, keyboards, piano, drums, synthesizers, programming, engineer, audio mixer

Additional musicians and production

- Sarah Beintker – additional vocals on track 1 & 3
- Sunsun – additional vocals on track 9
- Mod Sun (Derek Smith, formerly of Four Letter Lie) – additional vocals on track 10
- Bobby Parker – horn instruments on track 8
- Brandon Ebel – executive producer
- Aaron Sprinkle – producer on track 1, 3, 7 & 8
- Zack Odom – co-producer on track 2, 4, 5, 6, 9 & 10
- Kenneth Mount – co-producer on track 2, 4, 5, 6, 9 & 10
- Troy Glessner – mastering
- Andrew Smith – photography

== Charts ==
Chart performance for Water Colours
Chart (2011)	Peak position
US Top Christian Albums (Billboard)	40
US Heatseekers Albums (Billboard)	31

== Music videos ==
- Sleep to Dream on YouTube

Lyric videos

- Sleep to Dream on YouTube
- Good Times (featuring Mod Sun) on YouTube

== Notes ==
- "Sleep to Dream" was added as a track to two of Tooth & Nail's 2011 compilation releases: Tooth & Nail Records Summer Sampler 2011 and A Very Tooth & Nail Christmas Sampler.
- The song "Jacques Cousteau" is based on the oceanographer of the same name. According to Tofte, the band's name was inspired by the 1980s documentaries that Cousteau filmed and starred in.
