= Apollo 11 (album) =

Soundtrack album by Adam Young
- Released: February 1, 2016
- Studios: Sky Harbor Studios, Owatonna, Minnesota
- Length: 24:58
- Label: Sky Harbor
- Producer: Adam Young

Adam Young chronology
Apollo 11 (2016)	RMS Titanic: The Tragedy That Shook The World (2016)

Apollo 11 is a soundtrack album recorded by American electronic musician Adam Young. It is the first of eleven Scores Young has released. It was released independently via Sky Harbor on February 1, 2016. The album was also released for a free download on his website.

== Background and composition ==
On December 18, 2015, Young announced that he would focus on a new project titled "Adam Young Scores". During each month of 2016, he composed and recorded a score based on a subject of his choice, which is something he had wanted to accomplish for a long time. He based the first score off the Apollo 11 mission and released the record on February 1. Young stated that the space flight grabbed his imagination, when asked about why he created the score. The score is Young's interpretation of what happened in July 1969 and the types of emotions he wanted to capture with music.

== Artwork ==
The artwork was created by James R. Eads. Eads, who wasn't given a lot of direction outside of a couple of reference images that inspired Young while creating the score, stated he was given "a lot of freedom" while creating the artwork of Apollo 11.

== Critical reception ==
Professional ratings
Review scores
Source	Rating
Cross Rhythms	9/10 squares
Jesus Freak Hideout	4/5 stars

Apollo 11 was met with positive reviews from music critics. Joy Attmore of Cross Rhythms gave a positive review stating, "As soon as you press play on this record characters are brought to life and worlds are formed." She praised the first track, "Launch" for "rocketing the listener off into an adventure and world of sound led by the string section and brought to life by a wall of drums and brass." She described the third track, "CSM-LM Docking" as the "highlight" point of the album for its "repetitive chord structure to bring a driving energy to this track and a sense of new discovery."

Christopher Smith of Jesus Freak Hideout also gave a positive review remarking, "The atmospheres Young creates with full orchestra sounds and electric guitars explore the feelings of wonder and awe one might associate with such monumental moments for this mission – the excitement of the launch, the intensity of the lunar landing, the gentleness of Neil Armstrong's famous first step." He called the album a "moving piece of art that is sure to put you in a good mood."

== Track listing ==
All tracks are written by Adam Young.

No.	Title	Length
1.	"Launch"	3:33
2.	"The Lonely Three"	2:07
3.	"CSM-LM Docking"	2:07
4.	"Trajectory Burn"	2:45
5.	"400 Degrees Between Sunlight and Shadow"	2:21
6.	"Lunar Landing"	1:47
7.	"Mare Tranquillitatis"	1:37
8.	"First Step on the Surface"	1:48
9.	"Lunar Liftoff"	1:29
10.	"Return to Earth"	1:38
11.	"Re-Entry"	2:32
12.	"Splashdown"	1:08
Total length:		24:58
