= Ambient Blue =

EP by Swimming With Dolphins
- Released: September 2, 2008
- Genre: Electropop; synthpop
- Length: 23:42
- Label: Independent
- Producer: Adam Young

Swimming With Dolphins chronology
Ambient Blue (2008)	Water Colours (2011)

Ambient Blue is the debut release and first EP by the American electronica band, Swimming With Dolphins. It was released on September 2, 2008.

It is the first and only release with Adam Young, before shortly leaving the band after its release as Owl City's popularity began to increase.

== Background ==
The EP was produced by Adam Young. The song "Silhouettes", from the album, features guest vocals from Breanne Düren. In addition to the main release, the band also put out a cover version of Tracy Chapman's "Fast Car" as B-side single to the EP.

In September 2013, Tofte did an interview with Chris Herlihy's weekly syndicated radio show and talked about the band in general, which included a look back at the EP, where he revealed the EP was recorded in Young's parents basement.

== Critical reception ==
Professional ratings
Review scores
Source	Rating
AbsolutePunk	8/10 stars
Jesus Freak Hideout	4.5/5 stars
New Release Tuesday	4/5 stars
Under The Gun Review	7/10 stars

Ambient Blue was met with generally positive reviews from music critics. AbsolutePunk stated, "It's obvious they have the ear for lyrical strength, great vocal application, and strong production." Ben Cardenas of Jesus Freak Hideout called the EP, "inventive, catchy, and lengthy." He described the song "Everything's A Miracle" as "a fun dance song" and stated that the track is the highlight of the album. However, he criticized the track "Sunset 1989" for its sloppy, awkward chorus and called the song, "the weakest link on the album."

Despite having no chart success, the EP managed to sell over 9,000 copies on iTunes.

== Track listing ==
All tracks are written by Austin Tofte and Adam Young, except where noted.

No.	Title	Length
1.	"Silhouettes" (featuring Breanne Düren)	5:50
2.	"Pajama Party"	3:50
3.	"Sunset, 1989"	3:19
4.	"Everything's a Miracle"	5:41
5.	"Up in the Stars"	5:02
Total length:		23:42

B-side single
No.	Title	Writer(s)	Length
1.	"Fast Car" (originally performed by Tracy Chapman)	Tracy Chapman	4:39

== Personnel ==
Swimming With Dolphins

- Austin Tofte – vocals, keyboards, piano, synthesizers, programming, engineer, audio mixer
- Adam Young – keyboards, piano, synthesizers, programming, engineer, audio mixer

Additional musicians and production

- Breanne Düren – additional vocals on track 1, backing vocals on track 4
