= Swimming with Dolphins (band) =

American synthpop band

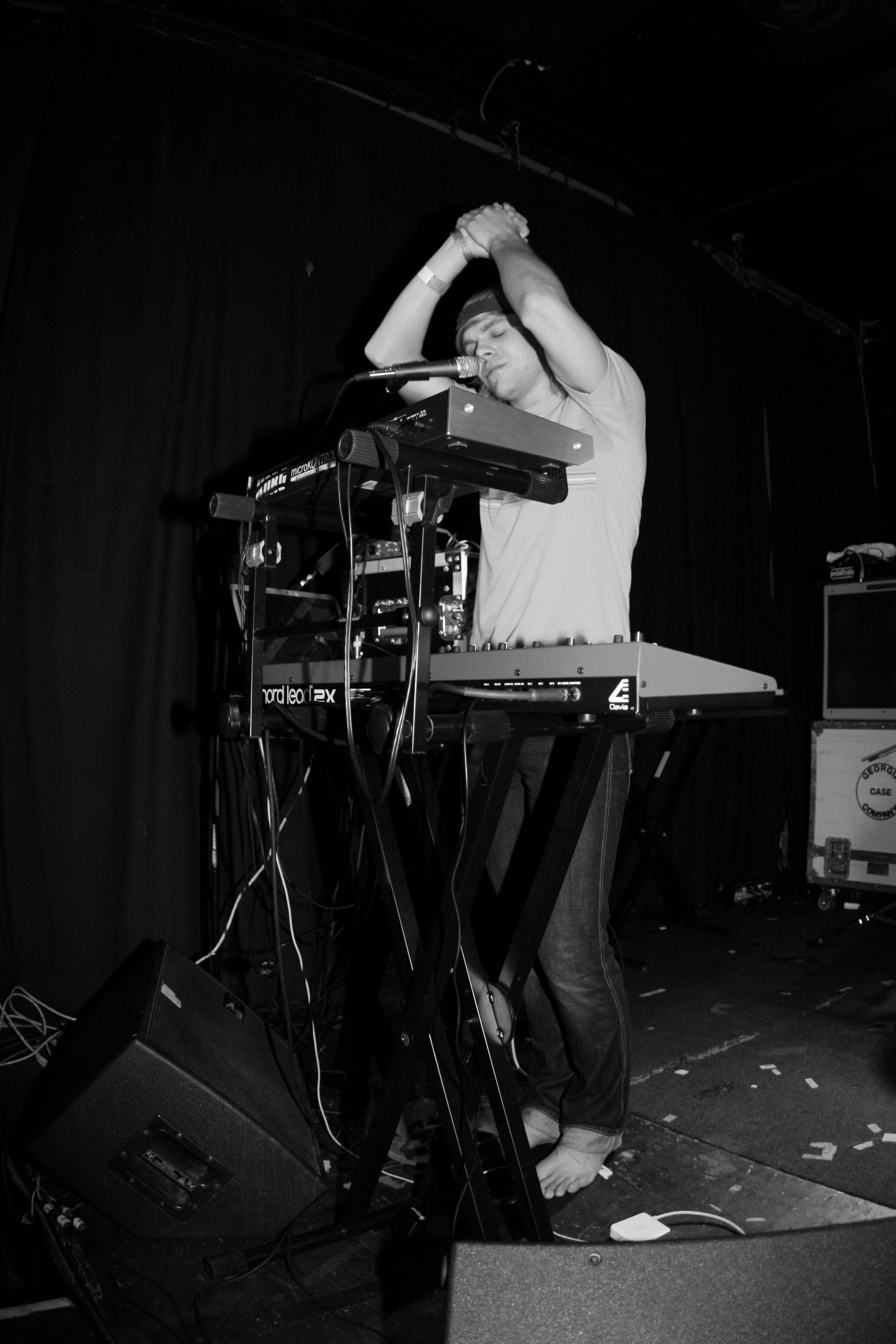
- Tofte of Swimming with Dolphins performing live in 2009

Background information
- Origin: Minneapolis, Minnesota, United States
- Genres: Electropop; alternative dance; indietronica; synthpop; indie pop; neo-psychedelia
- Years active: 2008–present
- Label: Tooth & Nail
- Members: Austin Tofte
- Past members: Adam Young

Swimming with Dolphins is an American electronica band from Minneapolis, Minnesota. The band formed in 2008 by Austin Tofte and Owl City frontman Adam Young. The name of the band was derived, according to Tofte, from "some old Jacques Cousteau documentaries from the 80s". The group is fronted by Tofte, while Young performed synths and programming for the act and additionally served as the producer of the group.

For the act, Tofte and Young created trademark outfits. Tofte took on the appearance of a submariner wearing a classic scuba suit and Young donned a pilot's mask (which would later become Sky Sailing's trademark look).

== History ==
The band made its debut with the release of their 2008 EP, Ambient Blue. The EP was produced by Young and sold over 9,000 digital copies. The song "Silhouettes", off the release, featured Breanne Düren. In addition to the main release, the band also put out a cover version of Tracy Chapman's "Fast Car" as B-sides single to the EP.

Young departed the band in late 2008 as Owl City's popularity began to increase. Alone, Tofte signed Swimming With Dolphins on to Tooth & Nail Records in June 2010. Recording for the album began in the summer of 2010 where it was produced by Aaron Sprinkle in Seattle. The album finished production in Atlanta with help from producers Zack Odom and Kenneth Mount. The debut album titled, Water Colours was set to be released in March 2011 but was pushed two months back. It was officially released on May 17, 2011. On August 5, 2011, Swimming with Dolphins uploaded the official music video for the first single off the record, "Sleep To Dream", via YouTube.

After Young's departure, Tofte was joined by Sarah Beintker and Torrie James as part of his live band. Beinker contributed her vocals to the songs "Holiday" and "Sleep To Dream" off Water Colours. The release also featured the artists Sunsun and Mod Sun. Swimming with Dolphins joined Abandon Kansas on a Spring Tour that began in March 2011. In support of his album, Water Colours, he joined Family Force 5 for the Tourantula tour during April and May 2011.

After the release of his debut album, Tofte had parted ways with Tooth & Nail and started to release music independently. In August 2013, Tofte launched an Indiegogo campaign to fund the project's upcoming album, Catharsis. The funding needed $12,000 in mixing and mastering the album, as well as creating an album cover art, among many more. In September 2013, Tofte announced that the campaign had been successful and would begin working on the album. That same month, Tofte did an interview with Chris Herlihy's weekly syndicated radio show and talked about the release. In a separate interview with Blue Freedom, Tofte stated that, "Catharsis is a cleansing and redemptive effort." He also believed he had "missed the mark" with his previous album release. Also in September, Swimming with Dolphins released a preview of the new album in the form of a single instrumental track, entitled "Tromsø", via SoundCloud. Swimming with Dolphins also posted a video for "Tromsø" via Vimeo around the same time.

According to Tofte in 2014, the album was very near completion. On August 21, Tofte stated that the track listing for the album would be revealed shortly. On August 29, Tofte released the raw rough draft of the track listing for the album as well as the cover art for a single entitled "Summer Skin", which is to be on the album. On September 23, "Summer Skin" was released to Swimming with Dolphins' SoundCloud. On December 18, Tofte announced that a big update on Catharsis was to be released soon. On May 1, 2015, Tofte revealed the album art for Catharsis as well as its release date of August 4, 2015. Tofte instead released the single "Iron Lungs" instead, saying he needed to "take a step back to recalibrate and determine a new release date" due to the premature announcement.

On January 11, 2016, to celebrate "Iron Lungs" hitting 5,000 streams on SoundCloud, Tofte released a reworked version of "Summer Skin" for the final version of Catharsis. On May 6, he released a new single, "Let You Love." On April 1, 2018, after an over year-long hiatus from making music, Tofte released a sample of "Roller Dancer", which will be released on Catharsis. As of January 2023, the album still has no release date.

Besides Swimming with Dolphins, Tofte was also a member of Owl City's live touring band in 2008.

== Musical style and influences ==
Swimming with Dolphins' music has been described as ambient, electropop, indie-pop and synth-pop. Their debut EP, Ambient Blue is a lot more experimental as the group works with synthesizers and features upbeat dance songs. Their debut studio album, Water Colours, was influenced by 80s' synth-pop music.

== Accolades ==
Cross Rhythms named Water Colours as one of the 20 best albums of 2011.

== Band members ==
Current members

- Austin Tofte – lead vocals, keyboards, piano, drums, synthesizers, programming

Former members

- Adam Young – synthesizers, programming

Former touring musicians

- Sarah Beintker – vocals, keyboards
- Torrie James – backing vocals, keyboards

== Discography ==
=== Studio albums ===
List of studio albums, with selected chart positions
Title	Album details	Peak chart positions	
Title	Album details	US Christ	US Heat.
Water Colours	Released: May 27, 2011; Label: Tooth & Nail Records; Format: CD, digital download	40	31

=== Extended plays ===
List of extended plays, with selected details
Title	EP details	Sales
Ambient Blue	Released: September 2, 2008; Format: CD, digital download	US: 9,000

=== Singles ===
Title	Year	Album
"Fast Car" (cover)	2008	Non-album single
"Sleep to Dream"	2011	Water Colours
"Tromsø"	2013	Catharsis
"Iron Lungs"	2015	Catharsis
"Summer Skin"	2016	Catharsis
"Let You Love"	2016	Catharsis
