= Gem (EP) =

Extended play by Breanne Düren

EP by Breanne Düren
- Released: September 18, 2015
- Genre: Indie pop, bubblegum pop
- Length: 22:28
- Label: DürenDüren Records
- Producer: Mark Heimermann

Breanne Düren chronology
Sparks - EP (2011)	Gem (2015)

Gem is the second extended play by American indie pop artist Breanne Düren, released digitally on September 18, 2015, through DürenDüren Records, after a successful Indiegogo campaign for the EP.

== Track listing ==
All tracks are written by Breanne Düren

Gem - EP
No.	Title	Length
1.	"Dizzy"	3:33
2.	"Dear Adelaide"	3:41
3.	"Starstruck Fiction"	3:51
4.	"Where We Are"	3:55
5.	"Sign of Life"	3:33
6.	"If You Ever Fall"	3:59

== Personnel ==
Credits for Gem adapted from back of CD Case

- Ian Allison – Bass on tracks 2 and 5
- Jim Anton – Bass on tracks 3 and 4
- Steve Goold – Drums on tracks 3 and 4
- Zach Miller – Drums on tracks 2 and 5
- Jasper Nephew – Guitar on all tracks
- Tara Marie Quadrel – additional vocals on track 1
- Whim Photography – artwork
- Zach McNair – art direction and design
- Evan Bakke – tracking engineer
- Rob Osterlin – tracking engineer
- Mark Heimermann – production, recording, and mixing
- Bob Boyd – mastering
