= Ready to Fly (Didrick song) =

2018 future bass pop song

Single by Didrick featuring Adam Young

from the album Monstercat Instinct Vol. 1
- Released: 9 January 2018
- Recorded: 2013–2017
- Genre: Future bass; pop
- Length: 3:10
- Label: Monstercat
- Songwriter: Adam Young
- Producer: Didrick

Didrick singles chronology
"Smoke" (2016)	"Ready to Fly" (2018)	"Rewind" (2018)

"Ready to Fly" is a song by Swedish electronic producer Didrick, featuring American singer, songwriter and multi-instrumentalist Adam Young of Owl City. Canadian record label Monstercat released it on 9 January 2018. The song was released as the debut of Monstercat: Instinct and was the first song to be released as part of the compilation album Monstercat Instinct Vol. 1, released 15 June 2018.

== Background and release ==
"Ready to Fly" was a song that Didrick and Young initially produced in 2013. On 8 January 2018, the day before the song's official release, Didrick wrote a statement on Instagram clarifying why exactly the song was shelved for five years before its official release, writing that various circumstances made it difficult for him to release music for the last couple years. Following the release his 2014 song "A Part of You", he was sued by some people he previously worked with to keep him from releasing his own music. Although the song was initially produced in 2013, it was further re-produced into various different versions. In 2017, Didrick was "finally free from all of the old contracts that were holding me back" and was finally able to start releasing music freely.

On 2 January 2018, Monstercat announced that the label would be split into two brands – Instinct and Uncaged – to represent the music released under either brand. Uncaged was to feature the "heavy-hitting and bass-fueled side" of music while Instinct was to feature the "pop-infused faction of music". Monstercat announced that Adam Young of Owl City and Didrick would be releasing music under the Instinct brand in 2018, alongside various other artists such as Conro, Vicetone, Stephen, Rogue, and Grabbitz.

Monstercat released the song as the debut of Monstercat: Instinct. When speaking about the release of the song, Didrick described working with Young as a "dream come true", writing:

"I grew up listening to his music, and he's been a great inspiration to me ever since I got into producing music. For me, the song represents having the courage to believe in and follow your dreams -- to take that leap of faith and to know that someone always has your back. Hopefully, the song can inspire people to do just that."

— Didrick talking about the release of "Ready to Fly"

"Ready to Fly" was featured on Monstercat's thirty-fifth compilation album titled Monstercat Instinct Vol. 1 released on 15 June 2018. It was the sixth track on the album, which also includes 39 songs by various artists and two album mixes.

== Critical reception ==
"Ready to Fly" received generally mixed to positive reviews. David Rishty at Billboard wrote that the song was a "feel-good record by Didrick that radiates with blissful melodies and a youthful vocal". Your EDM's Landon Fleury wrote that the song sounds more 'Owl City' then Young has himself, comparing the song to Young's previous song "All My Friends", writing that Didrick "did an absolutely incredible job translating that 2009-2011 synthpop style for a more modern, commercial audience (even sprinkling in elements of future bass and trap)." Writing for Noiseporn, Chelsea King described the song as "undoubtedly the perfect first release on Monstercat's Instinct", writing that the song was an "uplifting pop track laced with Young's vocals flawlessly intertwined and balanced into the melodies." Kassi Chrys of Dancing Astronaut praised the song, calling it a "flawless original", writing that the song was the "perfect blend of indie electronic sounds with a flair of pop crossover." Writing for EDM.com, Miljan Milekic described the song as having "quality production, beautiful and chill melodies, as well as haunting vocals." EDM Sauce's Sean Reis described the song as a blend of genres in a "perfect electropop embodiment", writing that the production was "born for Young's vocals, and ultimately, Didrick creates a new balanced and beautiful single." A writer for T.H.E - Music Essentials described the song as the "perfect embodiment" for the launch of Monstercat: Instinct as it contains a "flawless balance of pop influences from Adam Young's vocals and the vibrant dynamic sound from Didrick's versatile producing chops to create a spellbinding single."

== Track listing ==
Digital download – Single
No.	Title	Length
1.	"Ready to Fly"	3:10
Total length:		3:10

== Credits and personnel ==
Personnel

- Adam Young – lead vocals, songwriting
- Didrick– producer

== Release history ==
Region	Date	Format	Version	Label	Ref.
Worldwide	9 January 2018	Digital download	"Ready To Fly" (feat. Adam Young)	Monstercat	
Worldwide	15 June 2018	Digital download	Monstercat Instinct Vol. 1	Monstercat	
