= Mobile Orchestra =

Studio album by Owl City
- Released: July 10, 2015
- Recorded: 2014–2015
- Studios: Sky Harbor Studios, Owatonna, Minnesota; The Terrarium (Minneapolis, MN)
- Genres: Electropop; synth-pop; EDM; electronica
- Length: 35:49
- Label: Republic
- Producers: Aloe Blacc; Joshua Crosby; Joey Moi; Ryan Williamson; Adam Young

Owl City chronology
The Best of Owl City (2014)	Mobile Orchestra (2015)	Reel 1 (2017)

Singles from Mobile Orchestra
- 1. "Tokyo" Released: October 7, 2014; 2. "Verge" Released: May 14, 2015; 3. "My Everything" Released: June 5, 2015; 4. "Unbelievable" Released: June 26, 2015; 5. "You're Not Alone" Released: October 7, 2014

Mobile Orchestra is the fifth studio album by American electronica project Owl City, which was released on July 10, 2015. The album debuted at number 11 on the Billboard 200. This is the project's last album under Republic Records before releasing subsequent albums independently.

Young collaborated with several artists to provide additional vocals for the other songs on the album: English artist Sarah Russell for the track called "Thunderstruck", Jake Owen for the country pop song called "Back Home", vocalist Aloe Blacc for the graduation-themed song "Verge", Sekai no Owari for the song "Tokyo", Hanson for the song "Unbelievable" and Britt Nicole for the song "You're Not Alone".

== Background ==
In 2014, Owl City released an EP called Ultraviolet and released "Beautiful Times" as the lead single. Following the release, Young stated his intent to release a steady "series of EPs" in 2014 rather than one larger recording. On October 7, 2014, Young released two new songs simultaneously, "You're Not Alone" (featuring Britt Nicole) and "Tokyo" (featuring Sekai no Owari). The former would eventually become part of the international edition of the album while the latter would become the fourth track of the Japanese edition. The song "Up All Night" from the extended play Ultraviolet was included on the Japanese edition of the album as well.

On April 19, 2015, Owl City made an announcement stating that a new full-length album would be released in the summer. On May 12, 2015, the album name was revealed along with its artwork, track listing and release date was announced despite his intentions to release a series of EPs instead of a full-length album. In October 2015, Owl City embarked on a headlining tour called On the Verge Tour, with support from Rozzi Crane.

In an interview with Billboard, he revealed the intent behind the name of the album saying, "The title is kind of a pun on the fact that I have a hard time switching off the creative side of my brain. Therefore, I'm always working on some lyric or some rhyme or some melody that won't leave me alone. The blessing and the curse of how all this amazing technology now fits in a little box, in a laptop. The blessing and the curse is that you can always be working on something, literally anywhere. On the airplane, I'll probably do that later today. I'll probably be on the flight, putting my headphones on, just messing around. You can be on buses and trains. The idea is that, with all the technology, one guy sitting in front of a laptop can create the sound of an 80-person symphony. All the moving parts and all the bells and whistles. That's the cool imagery for what I do."

== Singles ==
After the song was previewed on ESPN's "Draft Academy" on May 5, it was announced that "Verge", featuring Aloe Blacc, would be released on May 14 as the album's lead single. A lyric video of "Verge" was later published on Owl City's Vevo channel on YouTube on May 13, 2015, along with an announcement for an upcoming music video. The music video for the song premiered via Yahoo! Entertainment on May 28, 2015. The song peaked at number 44 on the Japan Hot 100.

On June 5, 2015, "My Everything" was released as the second single. The music video for the song premiered that same day via VEVO and YouTube. The song peaked at number 22 on the US Hot Christian Songs chart. The song was serviced to Christian radio on July 31, 2015.

On June 26, 2015, "Unbelievable", featuring Hanson, was released. An animated music video for the song was released on June 29, 2015. The song peaked at number 20 on the US Hot Christian Songs chart.

== Critical reception ==
Professional ratings
Aggregate scores
Source	Rating
Metacritic	53/100
Review scores
Source	Rating
AllMusic	3/5 stars
The A.V. Club	C+
CCM Magazine	4/5 stars
Cross Rhythms	10/10 squares
The Guardian	2/5 stars
HM Magazine	3/5 stars
New York Daily News	2/5 stars
PPCORN	4.5/5 stars
USA Today	2.5/4 stars
Worship Leader	3.5/5 stars

The album received mixed reviews from music critics before its release. Brian Mansfield, rating the album two and a half stars out of four at USA Today, opines, "Young's light-hearted approach doesn't always work, though, even when his heart's in the right place". Awarding the album four stars from CCM Magazine, Andy Argyrakis states, "he has never been shy about his faith, which continues alongside the mounds of sugary surges that permeate...Mobile Orchestra". Sarah Brehm, giving the album three stars at HM Magazine, writes, "Mobile Orchestra is a solid electronica album". Rating the album four stars for Jesus Freak Hideout, Scott Fryberger describes, "another solid pop album...Mobile Orchestra is a big, fat, shiny diamond". Jessica Morris, indicating in a four and a half star review by PPCORN, says, "Mobile Orchestra is unpredictable, electric, vibrant and full of meaning...absolutely fantastic". Signaling in a four and a half star review from New Release Today, states, "Mobile Orchestra is easily the best alternative music album of the year...this album is chock-full of optimistic messages about love, faith and life wrapped around some incredibly hooky beats and dance floor tempos". Justin Sarachik of BREATHEcast commended the album commenting, "Overall Owl City's Mobile Orchestra is an intense musical symphony from all fronts that not only tickles the ears, but pulls on the heartstrings with hope, positivity, and encouragement. Adam Young unabashedly expresses his faith and beliefs on these songs, and does so to a mainstream audience without so much of a hint of holding back. Mobile Orchestra is a great release for Owl City, and a sure fire hit with some staying people." Reviewing for The National newspaper, Saeed Saeed also praised the album overall, rating it three stars and cited "Verge", "Back Home" and "My Everything" as the highlights of the album but was less positive to "Unbelievable" and "Bird With a Broken Wing". Ken Capobianco of The Boston Globe commented on the album positively saying, "Six years after the commercial breakthrough "Fireflies," Owl City's Adam Young has virtually mastered his poppy electronica-lite formula, and aims straight for the mainstream with this earnest, eager-to-please new work. These carefully manicured, melodic songs are much too transparent and lightweight, though, to leave much of an impression."

Despite its positive reviews, the album is not without its detractors. Opining for New York Daily News, Jim Farber gave the album 2 stars out of five saying, "Everything on the new album by Owl City sounds as if it was recorded by children, or trolls. In fact, it was largely created by an adult male: Adam Young, who uses Owl City as his stage name. From his first international smash, “Fireflies" in 2009, Young has specialized in candy-coated electronics, kiddie melodies and lyrics that could make a motivational speaker seem suicidally depressed." Rating the album also two out of five stars, Tshepo Mokoena of The Guardian also criticized the album saying, "Mobile Orchestra attempts to package and sell the intimacy of relationships. Unfortunately, the results are so poorly executed they feel almost insulting, employing cliches and metaphors rather than digging into the terrifying vulnerability and pulsating rush that accompanies romantic love." She added that the album is "unoriginal and twee" but "destined for commercial success." Randall Colburn, signaling with a C+ grade from The A.V. Club, believes, "It's both reassuring and mildly disappointing, then, that Mobile Orchestra finds Young branching out both sonically and lyrically...Nothing on Mobile Orchestra indicates he's found his new muse, but it reveals a well of passion for that discovery." Randy W. Cross, rating the album three and a half stars at Worship Leader, writes, "Mobile Orchestra is replete with the beats that brought throngs of fans to the Owl City sound."

In response to negative feedback, Young said in an interview with Billboard that, "There's definitely a trick. With anything that you do, for anybody, there's always going to be somebody who loves it, somebody who hates it, somebody in the middle. I feel like I read a stat once that was like, "If you put something out, there's 5% of everyone who loves it, 5% who hates it, and 90% of people who just kind of check it out and move on." So, it's definitely a trick to not dwell on the good or the bad. In terms of reading reviews online and things like that, I feel like I've nailed down a super healthy approach at that stuff. So, I will definitely check it out a little bit, but the moment it feels like I'm dwelling on it too much or thinking about it too much, I step back and remember at the end of the day, I've just got to do the best job that I know how to do and just be sincere and be honest, try to do the right thing. At the end of the day, people will talk and that's totally cool and I'll just keep fighting the good fight."

== Commercial performance ==
Mobile Orchestra debuted and peaked at number 11 on the Billboard 200 selling 16,000 copies first week. The album also debuted at number five on the Canadian Albums Chart with first week sales of under 2,000 units.

== Track listing ==
All tracks are written by Adam Young except where noted.

International edition
No.	Title	Writer(s)	Length
1.	"Verge" (featuring Aloe Blacc)	Aloe Blacc; Young; Matthew Thiessen; Emily Wright	3:33
2.	"I Found Love"		3:39
3.	"Thunderstruck" (featuring Sarah Russell)		4:07
4.	"My Everything"		3:45
5.	"Unbelievable" (featuring Hanson)	Young; Isaac Hanson; Thiessen; Wright	3:13
6.	"Bird with a Broken Wing"		3:55
7.	"Back Home" (featuring Jake Owen)	Young; Thiessen; Wright	3:09
8.	"Can't Live Without You"		3:11
9.	"You're Not Alone" (featuring Britt Nicole)		3:54
10.	"This Isn't the End"		3:23
Total length:			35:49

Japanese edition
No.	Title	Writer(s)	Length
1.	"Mobile Orchestra"		0:35
2.	"Verge" (featuring Aloe Blacc)	Blacc; Young; Thiessen; Wright	3:33
3.	"Up All Night"		3:51
4.	"Tokyo" (featuring Sekai no Owari)		3:39
5.	"I Found Love"		3:39
6.	"Unbelievable" (featuring Hanson)	Young; Hanson; Thiessen; Wright	3:13
7.	"My Everything"		3:45
8.	"Back Home" (featuring Jake Owen)	Young; Thiessen; Wright	3:09
9.	"Bird with a Broken Wing"		3:55
10.	"Thunderstruck" (featuring Sarah Russell)		4:07
11.	"This Isn't the End"		3:23
12.	"You're Not Alone" (featuring Britt Nicole)		3:54
13.	"Can't Live Without You"		3:11
Total length:			43:54

== Personnel ==
Owl City

- Adam Young - vocals, producer, all instrumentation (except on track 2 and 9), mixing on track 2, 3, 6, 7 and 8

Additional musicians

- Aloe Blacc - additional vocals, additional production, vocal producer (for Aloe Blacc): track 1
- Sarah Russell - additional vocals, vocal producer (for Sarah Russell): track 3
- Hanson - additional vocals on track 5
- Jake Owen - additional vocals on track 7
- Britt Nicole - additional vocals on track 9
- Sekai no Owari - additional vocals on track 4 (Japan edition)
- Stephanie Lauren - backing vocals on track 1
- Matthew Thiessen - backing vocals on track 1
- Emily Wright - backing vocals on track 1, vocal producer (for Sekai no Owari)
- Abbey Olmsted - backing vocals on track 1 and 4
- Minneapolis Youth Chorus - choir vocals on track 5
- Jasper Nephew - guitars on track 2 and 9
- Bryan Fowler - additional guitars on track 9, mixing assistant on track 4

Album production

- Steve Bursky - executive producer
- Ryan Williamson - vocal producer (for Hanson)
- Joey Moi - vocal producer (for Jake Owen)
- Joshua Crosby - vocal producer (for Britt Nicole)
- Matt Hoopes - vocal producer (for Stephanie Lauren)
- Christopher Stevens - mixing on track 4 and 9, additional programming on track 9
- Robert Orton - mixing on track 5 and 10, mixing on track 3 (Japan edition)
- Jerrico Scroggins - mixing assistant on track 9
- Ted Jensen - mastering
- Ben Adelson - A&R
- Rob Stevenson - A&R
- Rob Helmstetter - artwork

Source: Mobile Orchestra (Liner notes). Owl City. 2015.

== Charts ==
Chart performance for Mobile Orchestra
Chart (2015)	Peak position
Australian Albums (ARIA)	33
Belgian Albums (Ultratop Flanders)	161
Belgian Albums (Ultratop Wallonia)	144
Canadian Albums (Billboard)	5
Dutch Albums (Album Top 100)	83
Japanese Albums (Oricon)	40
South Korean Albums (Circle)	59
Taiwanese Albums (Five Music)	3
UK Albums (Official Charts)	98
US Billboard 200	11

== Release history ==
Region	Date	Edition	Format	Label	Ref.
Various	July 10, 2015	Standard	CD; digital download	Republic; Universal	
Japan	July 10, 2015	Bonus track; Commentary	CD; digital download	Universal	
