= An Airplane Carried Me to Bed =

Studio album by Sky Sailing
- Released: July 13, 2010
- Recorded: 2007–2010
- Genre: Acoustic; indie-pop
- Length: 38:35
- Label: Universal Republic
- Producer: Adam Young

Singles from An Airplane Carried Me to Bed
- 1. "Brielle" Released: July 13, 2010; 2. "A Little Opera Goes a Long Way" Released: July 13, 2010; 3. "Flowers of the Field" Released: July 27, 2010

An Airplane Carried Me to Bed is the first and only studio album by Sky Sailing, a project by Adam Young. The album comprises some of his early recordings from before he started Owl City. It was released on July 13, 2010, through Universal Republic. The album debuted at number 30 on the Billboard 200.

== Background and recording ==
Following the breakout success of Ocean Eyes in 2009, Adam Young announced that he would be re-launching his previous side project Sky Sailing. Young explained the record as "a step into the past" and details his perspective as "a shy boy from Minnesota with more hopes and dreams than he knew what to do with."

The album was recorded in the summer of 2007, according to Young. Most of the album was recorded in the basement of his parents house, although he re-recorded several parts in the spring of 2010. During that spring, he re-polished songs from the album on his laptop in between concert dates for his other project, Owl City. The songs were ideas that he had in mind and "wanted to get out."

He pitched the idea of releasing the album to Universal Records, which they were supportive of.

== Composition ==
The album is described as not "too much of a departure" from the Owl City sound, maintaining his whimsical, imagery and dreamy pop sound as presented on Ocean Eyes, however, the record features more acoustic instruments, aside from some drum programming, and Young described the lyrics as "darker" and "more mystery" from Owl City. Themes of darker and moodier writing are presented on songs such as "Brielle", a song about lost love and "I Live Alone", a song about dealing with loneliness and isolation. Twelve tracks were written using his uncle's old Alvarez guitar, with "Sailboats" being the first he wrote for the album.

== Release ==
Upon his return to Sky Sailing, Young uploaded two tracks on MySpace, "Brielle" and "I Live Alone". It was made available for streaming on July 9, 2010, before the album was released digitally on July 13 and released physically on July 27, via Universal Republic. On the release date of the album, Young also released two singles, "Brielle" as the lead single, and "A Little Opera Goes a Long Way" for a free download. An accompanying music video for the "Brielle" premiered on July 28, 2010, via VEVO. "Tennis Elbow" was released on July 22, 2010, for a free download on his newsletter. "Flowers of the Field" was released as the third and final single on July 27, 2010.

== Critical reception ==
Professional ratings
Review scores
Source	Rating
AllMusic	3/5 stars
Alternative Press	0.5/5 stars
Billboard	3.5/5 stars
Entertainment Weekly	B
HM	3/5 stars
Jesus Freak Hideout	4.5/5 stars
Newsday	B
New York Post	2.5/5 stars
Rolling Stone	3/5 stars

An Airplane Carried Me to Bed was generally well received by music critics. Scott Fryberger of Jesus Freak Hideout gave a positive review stating, "Young handles his lyrics so well, with some of the best lyricism you could find in pop music." He praised songs such as "A Little Opera Goes A Long Way", "Captains of the Sky", and "Brielle". He also compared the acoustic sound to indie rock band Death Cab For Cutie. However, he was critical of the melodies remarking, "as good as they are, almost feel copy-and-pasted." Billboard magazine stated, "Straying from the electronic-laced whimsical themes of Owl City, Young takes a more simple, honest approach to song-writing with Sky Sailing, resulting in a more lyrically grounded effort." Billboard called the song, "Tennis Elbow", as the "catchy standout track" and also called the album, "Young's more vulnerable side." Mikael Wood of Entertainment Weekly remarked, "On An Airplane Carried Me to Bed he uses more acoustic guitar than keyboard, but the wide-eyed sentiment of these dreamy lost-love songs is tweenpleasingly familiar." Glenn Gamboa of Newsday called the album "a more conventional indie-pop album."

Heather Phares of AllMusic gave a mixed review of the album stating, "Young's basic approach remains the same not just from project to project, but from song to song." She also added, "There aren't many peaks and valleys here, although 'Tennis Elbow' shows hints of Owl City, 'Take Me Somewhere Nice' blossoms from playful electric pianos to accordions on its choruses, and 'A Little Opera Goes a Long Way' shows off Young's guitar solo skills." Katie Toms of The Guardian stated, "'Brielle' is pretty, but essentially this is an album of excess material for the (admittedly legion) committed fans." Dan Aquilante of the New York Post stated, "The melodies are gentle, often veering toward lullabies... It should please Owl City fans even if the arrangements are simpler because it still carries Young's gift at pulling heartstrings." He praised the songs "Brielle" and "A Little Opera Goes a Long Way" calling them the standout tracks. P.F. Wilson of Cincinnati CityBeat stated there are "enough gems here to make it worthwhile."

== Commercial performance ==
An Airplane Carried Me to Bed debuted at No. 30 on the Billboard 200 and was one of the most-downloaded new albums on the week it was released. The album sold upwards to 15,000 copies in the US in its first week. To date, the album has sold 26,000 copies. The lead track "Captains of the Sky" peaked at number 19 on the US Rock Digital Song Sales chart and number 119 on the South Korean GAON International chart.

== Track listing ==
All tracks are written by Adam Young.

No.	Title	Length
1.	"Captains of the Sky"	2:44
2.	"Brielle"	4:06
3.	"Steady as She Goes"	2:37
4.	"Explorers"	4:10
5.	"A Little Opera Goes a Long Way"	3:49
6.	"Tennis Elbow"	3:45
7.	"Blue and Red"	3:40
8.	"Alaska"	2:37
9.	"I Live Alone"	4:05
10.	"Take Me Somewhere Nice"	2:48
11.	"Sailboats"	4:19
Total length:		38:35

iTunes pre-order bonus track
No.	Title	Length
12.	"Flowers of the Field"	3:55

"Sailboats", was first released under another project 'Seagull Orchestra' but was re-recorded and changed somewhat for release under Sky Sailing. The title of the album was also taken from this track, the lyrics for which can be heard at the start of one of the verses in the song.

== Personnel ==
Sky Sailing

- Adam Young – vocals, keyboards, piano, guitars, bass, drums, programming, producers, engineer, audio mixer

Additional musicians and production

- Steve Bursky – executive producer, management
- Greg Calbi – mastering
- Rob Helmstetter – art direction

== Charts ==
Chart performance for An Airplane Carried Me to Bed
Chart (2010)	Peak position
Japanese Albums (Oricon)	138
South Korean Albums (Circle)	84
Taiwanese Albums (Five Music)	8
US Billboard 200	30
US Top Alternative Albums (Billboard)	6
US Top Rock Albums (Billboard)	11
