= Adam Young =

American musician (born 1986)

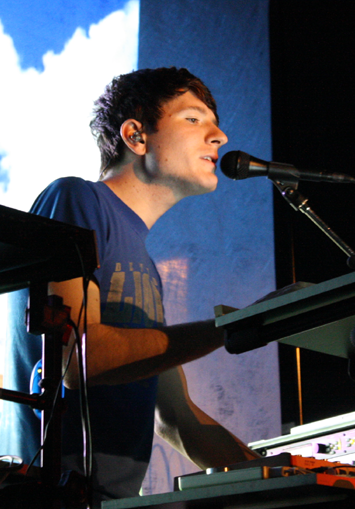
- Young performing at the Bowery Ballroom in 2009
- Born: Adam Randal Young; July 5, 1986 (age 40); Ottumwa, Iowa, U.S.
- Occupations: Singer; songwriter; musician
- Years active: 2002–present
- Musical career
- Origin: Owatonna, Minnesota, U.S.
- Genres: Ambient; contemporary Christian music; dance-pop; electronica; indietronica; synth-pop
- Instruments: Vocals; guitar; bass; drums; percussion; synthesizers; keyboards; accordion
- Member of: Owl City
- Formerly of: Swimming With Dolphins; Windsor Airlift
- Website: ayoungscores.com

Signature
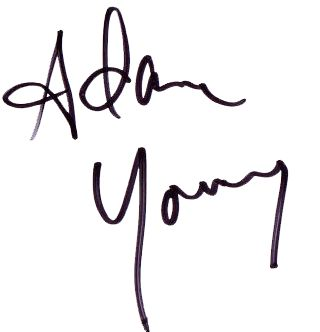

Adam Randal Young (born July 5, 1986) is an American singer, songwriter, musician and record producer. Best known as the founder and sole member of electronica project Owl City, Young has also recorded music under other musical projects, most notably Port Blue and Sky Sailing, and bands, including Swimming With Dolphins and Windsor Airlift.

Young has collaborated with musical artists such as Paul van Dyk, Chicane, Armin van Buuren, Schiller, Relient K, Jars of Clay, and Switchfoot. Young has composed music for brands such as Apple and Disney.

== Early life ==
Young was born Adam Randal Young in Ottumwa, Iowa on July 5, 1986 and was raised in Owatonna, Minnesota. He is the son of Joan and Randy Young. His mother worked as an elementary school teacher in the Owatonna school district. Growing up, he was in the band Windsor Airlift, and played guitar at church; he was raised as a Baptist. He graduated from Owatonna Senior High School and moved to Minneapolis, where he worked at UPS as a truck loader working night shifts. He then moved back to his parents’ in Owatonna and found work at a Coca-Cola shipping warehouse. He attended a community college for a general arts degree. However, he ultimately dropped out of college and continued working at Coca-Cola, while focusing on making music. He began composing melodies in his head while working, which he would then record in his bedroom, which was in his parents' basement. Young is a self-taught musician, briefly took guitar lessons, and considers the piano, guitar and drums as his main three instruments.

== Career ==
=== 2007–present: Owl City ===
Young began uploading songs recorded in his parents' basement to MySpace, where he started to attract favorable attention for his music. He released his debut studio album, Maybe I'm Dreaming independently on March 17, 2008. In February 2009, he signed with Universal Republic. His second studio album, Ocean Eyes, was released on July 14, 2009, and spawned three singles, most notably "Fireflies". The song peaked at number one for two non-consecutive weeks on the Billboard Hot 100 and was certified Diamond by the Recording Industry Association of America. On June 14, 2011, he released his third studio album, All Things Bright and Beautiful. His fourth studio album, The Midsummer Station, was released on August 17, 2012. The album's lead single, "Good Time" featuring Carly Rae Jepsen, peaked at number eight on the Billboard Hot 100. He composed the song "When Can I See You Again?" on Disney's Wreck-It Ralph in 2012. He released his fifth studio album, Mobile Orchestra on July 10, 2015, which was his last album released under Republic Records before parting ways with the label in 2016. He subsequently released his next two albums, Cinematic (2018) and Coco Moon (2023) independently.

=== 2002–2008: Windsor Airlift ===
In 2002, Young formed a pop-punk band with his childhood friends Anthony and Andy Johnson. The band later focused on making instrumental music with the addition of Michael DeMars in 2005. Young was the group's drummer and they released their debut EP, The Basement on April 25, 2003. The group would perform shows at local churches, as well as competing in the Steele County's Battle of the Bands competition in 2003 and 2004. He has been credited on several releases with the band, most notably: Selections for a Fallen Soldier Vol. 2, Ocean City Park, Hotels and Beneath the Crystal Waves. Young departed the band in 2008 to focus on Owl City.

=== 2006–2011: Sky Sailing ===
Sky Sailing is a musical project created by Adam Young and began in 2006. Young wrote and recorded Sky Sailing's songs while he was still working at Coca-Cola, living with his parents. He recorded songs for An Airplane Carried Me to Bed in the summer of 2007 before Owl City broke out into the mainstream. Once Ocean Eyes became a commercial success in 2009, Young announced that he would re-launch the Sky Sailing project in 2010. Young called the project, "darker, moodier, and much more organic" than Owl City and is a lot more acoustic. He pitched the idea of releasing the album to Universal Records, which they were supportive of. Originally, these songs were made for his friends to hear and were supposed to be put on his MySpace page before Owl City took off and Young decided to put Sky Sailing on hold.

Upon his return to Sky Sailing, Young uploaded two tracks on MySpace, "Brielle" and "I Live Alone". On July 13, 2010, he released his debut studio album An Airplane Carried Me to Bed and was one of the most-downloaded new albums on the week it was released. The album debuted on the Billboard 200 at No. 30. On the release day of the album, "Brielle" was released as its lead single and was sent to Triple-A and Hot AC radio formats. "A Little Opera Goes a Long Way" was also released on the same day for a free download. On July 22, "Tennis Elbow" was released for a free download on his newsletter. "Flowers of the Field" was released as a single on July 27.

Young initially had plans for a Sky Sailing tour in the spring of 2011, however, those plans were later scrapped.

=== 2006–2013: Port Blue ===
In 2006, Young formed an instrumental and ambient music project called Port Blue, creating electronic-based songs that he has described as "dreamscapes". One of Young's earliest instrumental projects, Port Blue was inspired by Saxon Shore, Unwed Sailor, Helios, Boards of Canada, and The Album Leaf.

On September 13, 2007, Young released his debut album as Port Blue, The Airship.

On January 10, 2008, Young released an initial follow-up EP, The Albatross.

In 2013, Young released his second EP, The Pacific, on his SoundCloud page.

=== 2008–2009: Swimming with Dolphins ===
In 2008, Young formed an electronica band along with Austin Tofte called Swimming With Dolphins.

On September 2, 2008, Young and Tofte released their debut EP, Ambient Blue. Young produced the EP, which would be the only release on which he was featured.

In 2009, Young left the band to focus on Owl City.

=== 2015–2016: Adam Young Scores ===
On December 18, 2015, Young announced that he would be focusing on a new project titled "Adam Young Scores". During each month of 2016, he composed and recorded a score based on a subject of his choice, which is something he had wanted to accomplish for a long time. Young stated he was originally inspired by the music from Disney films that made him want to create scores of his own. In reflection of this discussion, each song, 11 scores, were all based on historical events that impacted Adam Young in some manner over the time of his entire career as a musical artist and personal lifetime. On February 1, 2016, the first score, Apollo 11, which is based on the Apollo 11 mission, was released on Young's "Adam Young Scores" website. He released his second score, RMS Titanic on March 1, which is based on the sinking of the Titanic. His third score, The Spirit of St. Louis, was released on April 1, and is about Charles Lindbergh's transatlantic flight from New York to Paris. The Ascent of Everest was released on May 1, as Young's fourth score. The score is based on the 1953 British Mount Everest expedition and stated that the success of the expedition inspired him to create the score. On June 1, he released his fifth score, Omaha Beach. He released his sixth score, Miracle in the Andes on July 1. On August 1, he released his seventh score, Project Excelsior. He released his eighth score, Corduroy Road on September 1, and is based on the American Civil War. On October 1, he released his ninth score, Voyager 1 which is based on the first Voyager program launched by NASA in 1977. He released his tenth score, Mount Rushmore on November 1, and was inspired by the carved sculptures of four US presidents in Mount Rushmore. The Endurance was released on December 1, as the eleventh and final score. It is based on Ernest Shackleton's Imperial Trans-Antarctic Expedition in 1914.

=== Other side projects and collaborations ===
Young recorded music under the name Insect Airport. He has also done multiple screamo projects such as Aquarium and Novel, as well as played drums for a band called Isle. Young has experimented with comedy rap projects such as Charlton Heston and the Blast Beats, the Wellington Giggle-Bomb Experience and Apes with Guns. In 2004, he formed an electronic project called The Atlantic with Andy and Tony Johnson and released the album, I'll Set Out on an Ocean Voyage. In 2015, Young released an album titled, Mr. Wolf Is Dead, under the name Color Therapy. Other lesser known projects Young has created include, Dolphin Park, Keehar, The Grizzly and Seagull Orchestra.

Young was featured on the single "Middledistancerunner" by English electronic musician Chicane and was released on July 30, 2010. He also worked with Dutch producer Armin van Buuren, appearing on a track called "Youtopia" which was released as a single on November 28, 2011. In 2012, he was featured on the single "Eternity" by Paul van Dyk. In 2013, Young worked with Apple in creating some of their ringtones and system alerts on the iOS 7. In 2015, Young co-wrote and co-produced the single "Mr. Heartache" by Sekai no Owari which appeared on their fourth studio album, Lip. In 2018, Didrick released the single "Ready to Fly" which featured guest vocals from Young. Young sang a cover of "Gone" by Switchfoot and was released on September 15, 2023, on the deluxe edition of The Beautiful Letdown (Our Version).

=== Sky Harbor Studios ===
Young owns a home studio in his basement, Sky Harbor Studios. His studio consists of an SSL AWS console, Adam Audio S-4XV mains and an extensive collection of outboard gear. His studio also features four mobile equipment racks to "facilitate room reconfiguration to accommodate diverse session requirements." His equipment also includes a Steinway piano, Pro Tools, Moog, Roland and Korg synths, Gibson, Taylor and Fender guitars, and Marshall amplifications. The "polycylindrical ceiling cloud" is made for proper mixing position. His live room consists of a vocal booth to support Young's "keyboard-based productions."

Before opening up his own studio, he made music entirely on his own in his bedroom, which led to him wanting to build a studio. He also felt "uncomfortable" working in other studios and believed it affected his "creativity." Designed by John Storyk of WSDG, Young felt he "captured my vision for the facility." At his studio, he's provided remixing and production for artists including Dispatch, John Mayer, Relient K and Armin van Buuren.

== Musical styles and influences ==
Young has experimented with different genres of music. His music under Owl City has been described as dancepop, electronica and synthpop. Comparisons have been made to the Postal Service for its combination of fuzzy synths and ironic lyrics. Young also incorporates faith into his music, as well as experimenting with EDM. He cites Mark Schultz and Nichole Nordeman as Christian influences for his music. Young stated he was inspired by dance music and listens to a lot of trance DJs. He cites early influence from Dashboard Confessional. He also took inspiration from movie soundtracks and film scores which later inspired him to create scores of his own in 2016. He cited the 2003 film Finding Nemo as what inspired him to make music. Lyrically, he takes inspiration from reading the dictionary which allows him to "dream up an entire scenario or 'world' around it." He also credited Tom Delonge as another influence.

His side project Sky Sailing has been described as acoustic with fewer electronic elements compared to Owl City. The acoustic sound was compared to the indie rock band Death Cab For Cutie. He has also created instrumental and ambient music projects such as Port Blue and Color Therapy, with the former being influenced from bands like Unwed Sailor, Boards of Canada and Hammock. He played pop punk music with the band Windsor Airlift before they shifted their sound to post-rock. His music under the names Aquarium and Novel were described as screamo. His drumming for the band Isle was influenced by the bands Botch, Pelican, Neurosis and Isis. He also cited Norma Jean and As I Lay Dying as his "favorites" on listening to heavy metal music. His Adam Young Scores project was inspired by the music from Disney films like Aladdin, The Lion King and Beauty and the Beast, which led him into finding score composers such as John Williams, Thomas Newman, James Newton Howard and James Horner.

Speaking about the reason for creating various musical projects, Young stated he was "fascinated by the idea of one creative mind featuring all sorts of different avenues for his/her art." Finding himself inspired by a variety of music genres, having different musical projects allowed him "to still be creative and not feel married to one endeavor" and "allows for a lot of creativity that would otherwise be thwarted because of any sort of genre restraint or limitation."

== Awards and nominations ==
Young's album Ocean Eyes was nominated for Top Dance/Electronic Album of the Year at the 2011 Billboard Music Awards. "When Can I See You Again?", a song he composed for the 2012 film Wreck-It Ralph, was nominated for Best Original Song at the Phoenix Film Critics Society Awards in 2012. He was a recipient for the Annie Award for Outstanding Achievement for Music in a Feature Production in 2013.

== Personal life ==
Young is a devout Christian and has stated that his faith is the only thing more important to him than music. He is married and lives in Owatonna, Minnesota. He describes himself as introverted and believes he has symptoms of Asperger syndrome, though he has never received a formal diagnosis. Young enjoys photography and considers himself to be an amateur photographer.

== Discography ==
as Owl City

- Maybe I'm Dreaming (2008)
- Ocean Eyes (2009)
- All Things Bright and Beautiful (2011)
- The Midsummer Station (2012)
- Mobile Orchestra (2015)
- Cinematic (2018)
- Coco Moon (2023)

Adam Young Scores

- Apollo 11 (2016)
- RMS Titanic (2016)
- The Spirit of St. Louis (2016)
- The Ascent of Everest (2016)
- Omaha Beach (2016)
- Miracle in the Andes (2016)
- Project Excelsior (2016)
- Corduroy Road (2016)
- Voyager 1 (2016)
- Mount Rushmore (2016)
- The Endurance (2016)

as Port Blue

- The Airship (2007)

as Sky Sailing

- An Airplane Carried Me to Bed (2010)

as Color Therapy

- Mr. Wolf is Dead (2015)

with Swimming With Dolphins

- Ambient Blue (2008)

with Windsor Airlift

- Selections for a Fallen Soldier (2003)
- Moonfish Parachutist (2004)
- Selections for a Fallen Soldier Vol. 2 (2004)
- Qui! (2005)

Other appearances

Title	Year	Artist(s)	Album	Notes	Ref.
"Middledistancerunner"	2010	Chicane	Giants	Guest vocals	
"Youtopia"	2010	Armin van Buuren	Mirage	Guest vocals, songwriter	
"Eternity"	2012	Paul van Dyk	Evolution	Additional production, composer, guest vocals	
"Blinding Light"	2012	Switchfoot	Vice Re-Verses	Remixing	
—N/a	2012	Dispatch	Circles Around the Sun	Additional drum programming, mixing, production	
"Alive"	2012	Schiller	Sonne	Guest vocals	
"If I Fall Down"	2012	Outasight	Nights Like These	Producer	
"Mr. Heartache"	2015	Sekai no Owari	Lip	Songwriter, producer	
"Ready to Fly"	2018	Didrick	Non-album single	Guest vocals	
"Gone"	2023	Switchfoot	The Beautiful Letdown (Our Version)	Guest vocals	
