= Ocean Eyes Tour =

2010 concert tour by Owl City

- Tour by Owl City
- North American Spring Promotional poster
- Associated album: Ocean Eyes
- Start date: January 19, 2010
- End date: November 13, 2010
- Legs: 6
- No. of shows: 78

Owl City concert chronology
- Ocean Eyes Tour (2010); All Things Bright and Beautiful Tour (2011)

The Ocean Eyes Tour is the first headlining concert tour by American electronica project Owl City, in support of his second studio album, Ocean Eyes (2009).

== Background ==
Owl City released his second studio album, Ocean Eyes on July 14, 2009. In October 2009, Owl City announced the Ocean Eyes Tour. The first leg of the tour took place in the United States starting on January 20 to February 14, with Lights and Deas Vail serving as the opening acts. Owl City then toured across Europe for the second leg of the tour from February to March 2010, with Lights joining him again. Once the second leg of the tour finished, he joined Cobra Starship as the opening act on their Australian and New Zealand tour.

Owl City returned to North America for the third leg of the tour from March to May 2010. He later toured across Europe in May 2010 for four shows on the fourth leg of the tour. Owl City briefly opened for Maroon 5 and John Mayer in August 2010, before he travelled to Asia for three shows in November 2010 on the fifth leg of the tour. He concluded the Ocean Eyes tour in Oceania that same month.

== Reception ==
=== Critical response ===
The Ocean Eyes Tour was met with mixed to positive feedback by critics. Scott Fryberger of Jesus Freak Hideout gave a positive response with the show at the McCain Auditorium. He wrote, "I was very impressed at Owl City's professionalism and enthusiasm. Though I didn't expect the group to not give their all, as they come off as really friendly and loving, it was refreshing to see that they gave it 100%." The show at the Beaumont Club was met with mixed responses. Timothy Finn of Spin praised his live band writing, "thanks in large part to his band, which gave some of his songs a harder edge, and to one of his keyboard players, a woman who laid down some lovely harmonies." Elke Mermis of The Pitch wrote, "Owl City played an unarguably tight, well-executed set." However, Mermis criticized Young's stage presence stating, "Young looked like, well, a kid in his southern Minnesota basement, pretending to be a rock star."

Mikael Wood of the Los Angeles Times gave a mixed feedback of the concert at the Club Nokia. He praised the first half of the show noting, "The music was giddy and easy to follow but impressively detailed as well, with shifting layers of acoustic and electronic instruments. The technique worked in the background, though; like Owl City's music, this portion of the concert presented a slightly heightened rendition of reality." However, he was critical on the last half of the concert feeling that, "Young has already tired of the puppy-love juvenilia on Ocean Eyes." Similarly, Teresa Jue of the Daily Bruin gave a mixed response for the concert stating, "Owl City's keyboard medleys were catchy... The ultimate problem though, was that many of Owl City's songs are rather repetitive, making for similar rhythms and instrumental qualities that were at times indistinguishable from each other." Jesse Hughey of The Dallas Observer wrote a positive review for the Verizon Theatre concert. He wrote, "Owl City captures the turbulent, overblown emotions of that hormone-drenched age group perfectly." Writing for The Star Tribune, Jon Bream was critical on the State Theatre concert, describing the stage presence of Young "to be on autopilot," noting that "Maybe it was the rare afternoon time. Maybe he's bored. Maybe he's ready to move on to new material. Maybe he's tired."

Writing on the concert at the Ogden Theatre, The Denver Post gave a positive response noting, "Every song during the first half of the set was a fun, poppy, sometimes toe-tapping three-minute adventure with eclectic storytelling lyrics that ranged from a trip to the dentist to a walk through corn fields." Another positive review came from Caroline Sullivan of The Guardian writing on the concert at Shepherd's Bush Empire. She wrote, "There isn't much variety to his song structures, which incline toward straightforward pop-rock, but there are little surprises tacked on: the xylophone tinkles that herald 'Air Traffic', an oddly erotic introduction to 'Cave In', in which the string duo down instruments and cavort around a drum, like violin-playing sprites."

=== Commercial performance ===
The first few shows of the tour sold well as the McCain Auditorium concert reportedly sold out. The show at the Beaumont Club also sold out to a crowd of 1,200 people. The Club Nokia show were just shy of 4,000 people in attendance. His concert at the Diamond Ballroom had sold out, as well as many shows throughout February, with many tickets selling out. The concert at the Aragon Ballroom also had a sold out crowd. Another sold out show was at State Theatre. In the UK, the show at Shepherd's Bush Empire also had a sold out crowd.

== Opening acts ==
- Lights (North America, Europe & Asia)
- Deas Vail (North America)
- Paper Route (North America)

== Setlist ==
This set list is representative of the performance on January 20, 2010, at McCain Auditorium in Manhattan, Kansas. It does not represent the set list at all concerts for the duration of the tour.

1. "Umbrella Beach"
2. "The Bird and the Worm"
3. "Tip of the Iceberg"
4. "On the Wing"
5. "Air Traffic"
6. "Fireflies"
7. "Meteor Shower"
8. "The Technicolor Phase"
9. "The Saltwater Room"
10. "Dental Care"
11. "Hot Air Balloon"
12. "Cave In"
13. "Vanilla Twilight"
14. "Hello Seattle"

== Tour dates ==
Date	City	Country	Venue
North America
January 19, 2010	Omaha	United States	University of Nebraska
January 20, 2010	Manhattan	United States	McCain Auditorium
January 21, 2010	Kansas City	United States	Beaumont Club
January 22, 2010	Oklahoma City	United States	Diamond Ballroom
January 24, 2010	Indianapolis	United States	Murat Center
January 26, 2010	Madison	United States	Majestic Theatre
January 27, 2010	Cincinnati	United States	20th Century Theatre
January 28, 2010	Columbus	United States	Newport Music Hall
January 29, 2010	Towson	United States	Recher Theatre
January 30, 2010	Norfolk	United States	The NorVa
February 1, 2010	Charleston	United States	Music Farm
February 2, 2010	Jacksonville	United States	Freebird Live
February 3, 2010	St. Petersburg	United States	State Theatre
February 4, 2010	Fort Lauderdale	United States	Culture Room
February 5, 2010	Orlando	United States	House of Blues
February 6, 2010	Athens	United States	The Melting Point
February 8, 2010	Birmingham	United States	WorkPlay Theatre
February 9, 2010	Baton Rouge	United States	Varsity Theatre
February 10, 2010	Little Rock	United States	The Revolution
February 11, 2010	Valparaiso	United States	Valparaiso University
February 12, 2010	Indiana	United States	Indiana University of Pennsylvania
February 13, 2010	Grantham	United States	Messiah University
February 14, 2010	Baltimore	United States	University of Maryland
Europe
February 17, 2010	Brighton	United Kingdom	Komedia
February 18, 2010	London	United Kingdom	Electric Ballroom
February 19, 2010	Oxford	United Kingdom	O2 Academy
February 20, 2010	Newcastle upon Tyne	United Kingdom	O2 Academy
February 21, 2010	Birmingham	United Kingdom	O2 Academy
February 22, 2010	Manchester	United Kingdom	Manchester Academy
February 24, 2010	Amsterdam	Netherlands	Melkweg
February 25, 2010	Brussels	Belgium	Le Botanique
February 26, 2010	Paris	France	Le Nouveau Casino
February 27, 2010	Cologne	Germany	Gloria Theater
February 28, 2010	Munich	Germany	59:1
March 1, 2010	Berlin	Germany	Magnet Club
March 2, 2010	Copenhagen	Denmark	Amager Bio
North America
March 30, 2010	Boise	United States	Knitting Factory
March 31, 2010	Spokane	United States	Knitting Factory
April 1, 2010	Seattle	United States	Paramount Theater
April 2, 2010	Vancouver	Canada	The Centre
April 3, 2010	Portland	United States	Roseland Theater
April 5, 2010	San Francisco	United States	The Fillmore
April 6, 2010	San Francisco	United States	The Fillmore
April 7, 2010	Pomona	United States	Fox Theater
April 8, 2010	San Diego	United States	Soma
April 9, 2010	Los Angeles	United States	Club Nokia
April 10, 2010	Phoenix	United States	Marquee Theatre
April 12, 2010	Magna	United States	The Great Saltair
April 13, 2010	Denver	United States	Ogden Theatre
April 14, 2010	Tulsa	United States	Reynolds Center
April 15, 2010	Austin	United States	Stubb's BBQ
April 16, 2010	Houston	United States	Verizon Theatre
April 17, 2010	Dallas	United States	Nokia Theatre
April 19, 2010	Nashville	United States	War Memorial
April 20, 2010	Atlanta	United States	The Tabernacle
April 22, 2010	Washington, D.C.	United States	DAR Constitution Hall
April 23, 2010	Boston	United States	House of Blues
April 24, 2010	New York City	United States	Terminal 5
April 25, 2010	Philadelphia	United States	Electric Factory
April 27, 2010	Toronto	Canada	Sound Academy
April 28, 2010	Cleveland	United States	House of Blues
April 29, 2010	Royal Oak	United States	Royal Oak Music Theatre
April 30, 2010	Chicago	United States	Aragon Ballroom
May 1, 2010	Minneapolis	United States	State Theatre
May 2, 2010	Milwaukee	United States	Eagles Ballroom
May 4, 2010	Des Moines	United States	Val Air Ballroom
May 5, 2010	St. Louis	United States	The Pageant
Europe
May 8, 2010	Glasgow	United Kingdom	Barrowlands
May 9, 2010	London	United Kingdom	O_{2} Shepherd's Bush Empire
May 11, 2010	Paris	France	Élysée Montmartre
May 12, 2010	Cologne	Germany	E-Werk
Asia
November 4, 2010	Osaka	Japan	Big Cat
November 5, 2010	Nagoya	Japan	Club Quattro
November 6, 2010	Tokyo	Japan	Shibuya AX
Oceania
November 9, 2010	Sydney	Australia	Enmore
November 10, 2010	Melbourne	Australia	Palais Theatre
November 11, 2010	Brisbane	Australia	The Tivoli
November 13, 2010	Auckland	New Zealand	The Powerstation
