= Air balloon (disambiguation) =

An air balloon usually refers to a hot air balloon.

It may also refer to:

- Balloon (aeronautics)
- A generic balloon
- Balloon (disambiguation)

== Music ==
- "Air Balloon" (song), a 2014 song by Lily Allen
- "Air Balloon", a song by Savant from the album Orakel
- "Air Balloon", a song by Vixen from the album Tangerine
- "Hot Air Balloon", a song by Derek Minor from the 2013 album Minorville
- "Hot Air Balloon", a comedy routine by Dane Cook from 2010 I Did My Best: Greatest Hits Album
- "Hot Air Balloon", a song by Apollo Sunshine from the 2003 album Katonah
- "Hot Air Balloon", a song by Owl City from the album Ocean Eyes
- "Hot Air Balloons", a song by Freezepop from the 2010 album Imaginary Friends
- "Hot Air Balloons", a song by Some Girls from the 2005 album The DNA Will Have Its Say
- Hot Air Balloon (rock opera), a 1998 rock opera by Jon Gutwillig of The Disco Biscuits

== Other ==
- The Air Balloon, Birdlip, an 18th-century pub and major road junction in Gloucestershire, England
- Air Balloon (ship), two 18th-century merchant vessels named "Air Balloon"

== See also ==
- Hot air balloon (disambiguation)
