= Hot air balloon (disambiguation) =

A hot air balloon is a lighter than air aircraft.

Hot air balloon may also refer to:

- Hot Air Balloon (rock opera), a rock opera written in 1998
- "Hot Air Balloon" (song), a song on the album Ocean Eyes by Owl City
- Hot air ballooning, the activity involving hot air balloons

== See also ==
- Air balloon (disambiguation)
- Balloon (aeronautics)
