= Ocean Eyes =

Ocean Eyes may refer to:

- Ocean Eyes (album), a 2009 album by Owl City
- "Ocean Eyes" (song), a 2016 song by Billie Eilish
