= List of shipwrecks in September 1826 =

The list of shipwrecks in September 1826 includes some ships sunk, wrecked or otherwise lost during September 1826.

== 1 September ==
List of shipwrecks: 1 September 1826
Ship	State	Description
Harriet	United States	The brig was driven ashore and wrecked on the north west coast of Barbados. She was on a voyage from Bath, Maine to Dominica.
Hope	United Kingdom	The ship struck a rock at Stornoway, Isle of Lewis, Outer Hebrides and was severely damaged. She was on a voyage from "Wyburg" to Dublin. Hope was refloated on 8 September and taken in to Stornoway for repairs

== 2 September ==
List of shipwrecks: 2 September 1826
Ship	State	Description
Europa	United Kingdom	The ship capsized at Gosport, Hampshire.
Mary	(United Kingdom of Great Britain and Ireland) Grenada	The sloop was wrecked on Trinidad.

== 3 September ==
List of shipwrecks: 3 September 1826
Ship	State	Description
Herald	United Kingdom	The ship ran aground and sank off Sheringham, Norfolk. Her crew were rescued by the Sheringham Lifeboat.
Harriet	United States	The ship was wrecked on the north coast of Bermuda.
Thetford	United Kingdom	The ship was driven ashore and wrecked at Happisburgh, Norfolk. Her crew were rescued. She was on a voyage from Hull, Yorkshire to Rotterdam, South Holland, Netherlands. Thetford was refloated on 9 September and taken in to Great Yarmouth, Norfolk.

== 4 September ==
List of shipwrecks: 4 September 1826
Ship	State	Description
Exeter	United Kingdom	The sloop caught fire in the North Sea and was beached and scuttled at Reculver, Kent. She was on a voyage from Exeter, Devon to London. Exeter was refloated on 5 September and taken in to Whitstable, Kent in a severely damaged condition.
Robert	United Kingdom	The ship was driven ashore 9 nautical miles (17 km) south east of Havre de Grâce, Seine-Inférieure, France. Her crew were rescued. She was on a voyage from Newcastle upon Tyne, Northumberland to Caen, Calvados. Robert was refloated on 6 September and taken in to Havre de Grâce.
Welcome	United Kingdom	The ship ran aground in the Swine Bottoms, in the Baltic Sea. She was on a voyage from Plymouth, Devon to Saint Petersburg, Russia. Welcome was refloated and put into Copenhagen, Denmark for repairs.

== 5 September ==
List of shipwrecks: 5 September 1826
Ship	State	Description
Helena	United Kingdom	The ship was boarded in the Bristol Channel by a pilot. No further trace, presumed foundered with the loss of all on board. She was on a voyage from Jersey, Channel Islands to Bristol, Gloucestershire.

== 6 September ==
List of shipwrecks: 6 September 1826
Ship	State	Description
Der Klein Paul	Wismar	The ship was driven ashore and wrecked at Mockbeggar, Cheshire with the loss of five of the seven people on board. She was on a voyage from Wismar to Liverpool, Lancashire, United Kingdom.
Eliza and Jane	United Kingdom	The ship was wrecked on the Goodwin Sands, Kent. Her crew were rescued. She was on a voyage from Newport, Monmouthshire to London.
Esk	United Kingdom	The whaler was driven ashore and wrecked at Marske-by-the-Sea, Yorkshire with the loss of all but four of her crew.
Francis Freeling	United Kingdom	The brig foundered in the English Channel with the loss of all sixteen people on board. She was on a voyage from Weymouth, Dorset to the Channel Islands.
Helen	United Kingdom	The ship foundered in the Irish Sea off Holyhead, Anglesey with the loss of all ten people on board.
Isabella	United Kingdom	The ship was driven ashore at Seacombe, Cheshire. She was on a voyage from Liverpool to New Orleans, Louisiana. She was later refloated.
Isabella	United Kingdom	The ship was driven ashore and damaged at Hartlepool, County Durham. She was on a voyage from Arkhangelsk, Russia to Hull, Yorkshire. She was refloated on 18 September and taken in to Hartlepool.
Providence	United Kingdom	The ship was wrecked on the Marsden Rock, in the North Sea off North Shields, County Durham. Her crew were rescued. She was on a voyage from King's Lynn, Norfolk to Newcastle upon Tyne, Northumberland.
Triune	United Kingdom	The ship was driven ashore and wrecked at Sunderland, County Durham.
Walrus	United Kingdom	The ship was wrecked near Cape Chat, Lower Canada, British North America. She was on a voyage from London to Quebec City, Lower Canada.

== 7 September ==
List of shipwrecks: 7 September 1826
Ship	State	Description
Air Balloon	United Kingdom	The ship was driven ashore at Whitby, Yorkshire. Her crew were rescued. She was on a voyage from Littlehampton, Sussex to Sunderland, County Durham. Air-balloon was refloated on 17 September and taken in to Whitby.
Apollo	United Kingdom	The sloop was wrecked on the Herd Sand, in the North Sea off North Shields, County Durham. Her crew were rescued. She was on a voyage from Inverness to Hull, Yorkshire.
Cato	United Kingdom	The sloop was driven ashore at Wells-next-the-Sea, Norfolk. She was on a voyage from Boston, Lincolnshire to Colchester, Essex. Cato was later refloated and taken in to Wells-next-the-Sea.
Charming Nancy	United Kingdom	The ship foundered in the Atlantic Ocean (40°30′N 24°30′W). She was on a voyage from Jersey, Channel Islands, to Gaspé, Quebec, British North America.
Delight	United Kingdom	The ship sprang a leak and was beached between Dunster and Minehead, Somerset. Her crew were rescued. She was on a voyage from Tenby, Pembrokeshire to Bridgwater, Somerset.
Diligence	United Kingdom	The brig was driven ashore between Hartlepool and Seaton Delaval, County Durham. She was on a voyage from Sunderland to Plymouth, Devon.
Esther	United Kingdom	The ship was driven ashore and wrecked in Widemouth Bay, Cornwall with the loss of all but one of her crew. She was on a voyage from Bristol, Gloucestershire to London.
Frances	United Kingdom	The ship was run down and sunk in the Irish Sea off Anglesey by Britannia (United Kingdom).
General Brown	United Kingdom	The ship struck the Middle Patch, in Liverpool Bay and was severely damaged. She was on a voyage from Miramichi, New Brunswick, British North America to Liverpool. General Brown was later refloated and taken in to the River Dee.
George	United Kingdom	The brig was driven ashore between Hartlepool and Seaton Delaval.
Hoffnung	Hamburg	The ship was driven ashore and wrecked between Étaples, Pas-de-Calais and Saint-Valery-sur-Somme, Somme, France. Her crew were rescued. She was on a voyage from Bordeaux, Gironde, France to Hamburg.
Hope	United Kingdom	The smack was driven ashore and wrecked at Kirkcaldy, Fife.
James	(United Kingdom of Great Britain and Ireland) Isle of Man	The sloop was driven ashore at the mouth of the Voryd River, Flintshire. All on board were rescued. She was on a voyage from Lancaster, Lancashire to Liverpool.
Lively	United Kingdom	The ship was driven ashore near Stallingborough, Lincolnshire. She was on a voyage from Great Yarmouth, Norfolk to Gainsborough, Lincolnshire.
Phœnix	United Kingdom	The ship was driven ashore 7 nautical miles (13 km) west of Abergele, Denbighshire. She was on a voyage from Newry, County Antrim to Liverpool.
Quintillian	United Kingdom	The brig was driven ashore and wrecked at Whitby with the loss of two lives.
Sablaise	France	The ship was driven ashore and wrecked between Seaton Delaval and Hartlepool. She was on a voyage from Newcastle upon Tyne, Northumberland to a French port.
Sophia	Prussia	The ship was driven ashore on the Point of Ayr, Flintshire. She was on a voyage from Stralsund to Liverpool.
Speculation	United Kingdom	The ship capsized in the Red Cliff Channel. Her crew were rescued. She was on a voyage from Colchester, Essex to Gainsborough, Lincolnshire.
Stafford	United Kingdom	The brig was driven ashore between Hartlepool and Seaton Delaval.
St. George	United Kingdom	The sloop was driven ashore at the mouth of the Voryd River. All on board were rescued. She was on a voyage from Drogheda, County Louth to Liverpool.
Triton	United Kingdom	The brig was driven ashore at Runswick Bay, Yorkshire. Her crew were rescued.
No. 16	Imperial Russian Navy	The transport ship ran aground and was wrecked near the mouth of the Daugava. Her crew survived. She was on a voyage from Pernau to Riga.

== 8 September ==
List of shipwrecks: 8 September 1826
Ship	State	Description
Bounty	United Kingdom	The ship was wrecked on the Barnard Sand, in the North Sea off the coast of Norfolk. Her crew were rescued by the Pakefield Lifeboat. She was on a voyage from Sunderland, County Durham to Boston, Lincolnshire.
Brothers	United Kingdom	The ship was driven ashore at Ryde, Isle of Wight.
Concordia	Prussia	The ship ran aground in the English Channel off Oye-Plage, Pas-de-Calais, France. She was on a voyage from Memel to Nantes, Loire-Inférieure, France.
Conestoga	United States	The ship capsized at Dieppe, Seine-Inférieure, France. She was on a voyage from New Orleans, Louisiana to Hamburg.
Duke of York	United Kingdom	The sloop was driven ashore and wrecked at Hutcliff, Yorkshire. Her crew were rescued.
Fair Ellen	United Kingdom	The ship was driven ashore and severely damaged at St. Agnes, Cornwall. She was on a voyage from Cardiff, Glamorgan to London.
Faith	United Kingdom	The ship was driven ashore near Tetney, Lincolnshire.
Fortuna	(Russian Empire) Grand Duchy of Finland	The ship was wrecked on Holmön, Sweden. She was on a voyage from St. Ubes, Portugal to Oulu.
Hanibal	United States	The ship capsized in the Atlantic Ocean. Her crew were rescued. She was on a voyage from Bath, Maine to Nevis.
Hope	United Kingdom	The ship was driven ashore near Bridgwater. She was later refloated and resumed her voyage to London.
Levant	United Kingdom	The ship was abandoned in the Atlantic Ocean. Her crew survived. She was on a voyage from Jamaica to London.
Rochdale	United Kingdom	The ship was driven ashore and wrecked south of Whitby, Yorkshire with the loss of a crew member.
Severn	United Kingdom	The ship was driven ashore near Bridgwater.
Ulrica	Sweden	The ship was wrecked 3 nautical miles (5.6 km) east of Calais, France. She was on a voyage from Stockholm to a Spanish port.
Wilhelmine	Danzig	The ship foundered in the North Sea. Her crew were rescued. she was on a voyage from Nantes to Danzig.

== 9 September ==
List of shipwrecks: 9 September 1826
Ship	State	Description
Chance	(United Kingdom of Great Britain and Ireland) British North America	The ship was driven ashore near Long Island, New York, United States. She was on a voyage from Saint John, New Brunswick to Jamaica.
Charming Nancy	United Kingdom	The ship was abandoned in the Atlantic Ocean. Her crew were rescued by Volante (United Kingdom). Charming Nancy was on a voyage from Jersey, Channel Islands to Gaspé, Lower Canada, British North America.
Petit Jules	France	The ship was wrecked near Málaga, Spain. Her crew were rescued. She was on a voyage from Marseille, Bouches-du-Rhône to Caen, Calvados.

== 10 September ==
List of shipwrecks: 10 September 1826
Ship	State	Description
Immina Baumann	Kingdom of Hanover	The ship was lost near Helsingborg, Grand Duchy of Finland. Her crew were rescued.
Royal Sovereign	United Kingdom	The ship was wrecked near Cape St. Vincent, Portugal. Her crew were rescued. She was on a voyage from Liverpool, Lancashire, to Genoa, Kingdom of Sardinia.
United Kingdom	United Kingdom	The ship ran aground at "Rodhuus" with some loss of life. She was on a voyage from Liverpool, Lancashire to Riga, Russia.
No. 17	Imperial Russian Navy	The transport ship ran aground and was wrecked on the London Shallows, (Note: Named after the Russian ship wrecked there in 1719.) west of Kotlin Island. Her crew were rescued. She was on a voyage from Kronstadt to refloat Mezen (Imperial Russian Navy), wrecked on 27 August.

== 11 September ==
List of shipwrecks: 11 September 1826
Ship	State	Description
Josephine	Sweden	The ship was blown over whilst under repairs at Jersey, Channel Islands. She was declared a total loss.
Rapid	United Kingdom	The whaler ran aground in the Straits of Floris and was abandoned by her crew, who were attacked by the local inhabitants. They returned to the ship and defended themselves until their ammunition ran out. Rapid was then set afire and the crew escaped in the ship's boats.

== 12 September ==
List of shipwrecks: 12 September 1826
Ship	State	Description
James	United Kingdom	The ship was driven on Entry Island, Lower Canada, British North America. Her crew were rescued. She was on a voyage from Portsmouth, Hampshire to Quebec City, Lower Canada. James was later refloated and towed to Quebec City.
Maria	United Kingdom	The ship was driven ashore and wrecked at Memel, Prussia. She was on a voyage from Saint Petersburg, Russia to Dublin.

== 13 September ==
List of shipwrecks: 13 September 1826
Ship	State	Description
Constance	United Kingdom	The ship sprang a leak and foundered off Newburgh, Fife. She was on a voyage from a Baltic port to Perth.
Gratitude	United Kingdom	The ship was wrecked on a reef off Cozumel, Mexico. All on board were rescued. She was on a voyage from Nicaragua to Liverpool, Lancashire.
Horton	United Kingdom	The ship was driven ashore at "Falkenburg". She was on a voyage from Newcastle upon Tyne, Northumberland to the Duchy of Holstein. Horton was later refloated.
James	United Kingdom	The ship was driven ashore and wrecked at São Miguel Island, Azores.
Uranus	Netherlands	The ship was damaged by fire at a Norwegian port. She was on a voyage from Arkhangelsk, Russia to Amsterdam, North Holland.

== 14 September ==
List of shipwrecks: 14 September 1826
Ship	State	Description
Henry & Harriet	United Kingdom	The ship was driven ashore on Dragør, Denmark. She was on a voyage from Whitby, Yorkshire to Saint Petersburg, Russia. Henry & Harriet was later refloated and taken in to "Deerhaven".
Rolla	United Kingdom	The ship was driven ashore on Saaremaa, Russia. She was on a voyage from Saint Petersburg, Russia to Great Yarmouth, Norfolk. Rolla was refloated on 14 October and put into Kuressaare for repairs.
Sam	United Kingdom	The ship sank 2 nautical miles (3.7 km) west of Dunbar, Lothian. She was on a voyage from Berwick upon Tweed, Northumberland to Grangemouth, Stirlingshire.

== 15 September ==
List of shipwrecks: 15 September 1826
Ship	State	Description
Briton	United Kingdom	The ship was driven ashore near Alnmouth, Northumberland. She was on a voyage from Sunderland, County Durham to Aberdeen.
Brothers	United Kingdom	The ship struck the Barrel Rocks, in the Irish Sea off the coast of County Louth and sank with the loss of her captain. She was on a voyage from Bangor, Caernarfonshire to Newry, County Antrim.
Fancy	United Kingdom	The ship ran aground on the Leak Shoal, near the Runnel Stone and foundered. Her crew were rescued by HMRC Dove Board of Customs). She was on a voyage from Exmouth, Devon to Neath, Glamorgan.
Queen Charlotte	United Kingdom	The ship was wrecked on the Goodwin Sands, Kent. Her crew were rescued. She was on a voyage from Newcastle upon Tyne, Northumberland to Jersey, Channel Islands.

== 16 September ==
List of shipwrecks: 16 September 1826
Ship	State	Description
Good Intent	United Kingdom	The ship was driven ashore and wrecked on the Hurst Spit, Hampshire. She was on a voyage from Plymouth, Devon to Portsmouth, Hampshire.
Royal Oak	United Kingdom	The ship sank at Hoylake, Lancashire with the loss of a crew member. She was on a voyage from Ulverston to Liverpool, Lancashire.
Sally	United Kingdom	The ship was driven ashore at Rossall, Lancashire. She was on a voyage from Ulverston to Rossall.
Town	United Kingdom	The ship foundered in the Irish Sea off the Point of Ayr, Flintshire. She was on a voyage from Ulverston to Liverpool.

== 17 September ==
List of shipwrecks: 17 September 1826
Ship	State	Description
Active	(United Kingdom of Great Britain and Ireland) Jersey	The ship was abandoned in the Atlantic Ocean. Her crew were rescued by Otter (United States). She was on a voyage from Jersey to Newfoundland, British North America.
Margaret	United Kingdom	The ship was driven ashore on "Wrangel". She was on a voyage from London to Saint Petersburg, Russia. Margaret was refloated on 22 September and taken in to Reval, Russia.

== 18 September ==
List of shipwrecks: 18 September 1826
Ship	State	Description
Jane	United Kingdom	The ship was driven ashore and wrecked at Bray Head, County Wicklow. Her crew were rescued.
Neptune	United Kingdom	The ship was abandoned in the Atlantic Ocean. Five crew were rescued by Cadmus (United States). Neptune was on a voyage from Saint Kitts to Nova Scotia, British North America.
Norval	United Kingdom	The ship was driven ashore and wrecked in Glenarvon Bay.
St. Michael	(United Kingdom of Great Britain and Ireland) New South Wales	The ship departed from Sydney for Newcastle. No further trace, presumed foundered with the lloss of all hands.
Susana and Catherine	Norway	The ship was driven onto rocks at Gothenburg, Sweden and sank. Her crew were rescued. She was on a voyage from Bergen to Riga, Russia.
Victory	United Kingdom	The ship was wrecked on Engelsmanplaat, Friesland, Netherlands. Her crew were rescued. She was on a voyage from Arkhangelsk, Russia to Amsterdam, North Holland, Netherlands.

== 19 September ==
List of shipwrecks: 19 September 1826
Ship	State	Description
Frau Sophia	Hamburg	The ship sprang a leak and sank at Quillebeuf-sur-Seine, Eure, France. She was on a voyage from Hamburg to Quillebeuf-sur-Seine.
John Twizzel	United Kingdom	The ship was driven ashore and damaged on Bird Island. Her crew were rescued. She was on a voyage from Quebec City, Lower Canada, British North America to Dublin. John Twizzellater floated off, she was subsequently taken in to Bathurst, New Brunswick, British North America.
Sarah & Mary	United Kingdom	The ship was wrecked on the Mouse Sand. She was on a voyage from Boston, Lincolnshire to London.
Two Friends	United Kingdom	The ship was wrecked on Trinidad. She was on a voyage from the Orinoco River to Demerara.

== 20 September ==
List of shipwrecks: 20 September 1826
Ship	State	Description
Catharine	United Kingdom	The ship struck a rock and sank at Jersey, Channel Islands.
Gannet	United Kingdom	The ship foundered off the Caicos Islands. She was on a voyage from New Orleans, Louisiana, United States to Jamaica.

== 21 September ==
List of shipwrecks: 21 September 1826
Ship	State	Description
Fancy	United Kingdom	The sloop was driven ashore near Balbriggan, County Dublin. She was on a voyage from Workington, Cumberland to Skerries, County Dublin.
Mary	United Kingdom	The ship struck the Ore and Lemon Sandbank and capsized. Her crew were rescued.

== 22 September ==
List of shipwrecks: 22 September 1826
Ship	State	Description
John & Grace	United Kingdom	The sloop was driven ashore at Oban, Argyllshire. She was on a voyage from Portsoy, Aberdeenshire to Easdale, Argyllshire.

== 23 September ==
List of shipwrecks: 23 September 1826
Ship	State	Description
Morse	United States	The ship was abandoned in the Atlantic Ocean. She was on a voyage from Portland, Oregon to the West Indies.
Waterloo	(United Kingdom of Great Britain and Ireland) Barbados	The schooner was driven ashore and wrecked at Mayaro, Trinidad.
Westbury	United Kingdom	The ship was abandoned in the Atlantic Ocean. Her crew were rescued by Columbine (United States). Westbury was on a voyage from St. Andrew, New Brunswick, British North America to Liverpool, Lancashire. She was discovered the next day by Bolivar (United States. A skeleton crew was put aboard and she was taken in to New York, United States, where she arrived on 14 October.

== 24 September ==
List of shipwrecks: 24 September 1826
Ship	State	Description
Martha	(United Kingdom of Great Britain and Ireland) Cape Colony	The ship was driven ashore and wrecked near Cape Infanta. Her crew were rescued. She was on a voyage from Mosel Bay to Table Bay.

== 25 September ==
List of shipwrecks: 25 September 1826
Ship	State	Description
Annette	Lübeck	The ship was driven ashore in Monkwich Bay. She was on a voyage from Saint Petersburg, Russia to Lübeck.
Dwina	United Kingdom	The ship capsized at Bristol, Gloucestershire. She was refloated the next day.
Heureux Espoir	France	The ship sprang a leak and was beached near Reval, Russia, where she sank. She was on a voyage. from Saint Petersburg to Havre de Grâce and Rouen, Seine-Inférieure.

== 26 September ==
List of shipwrecks: 26 September 1826
Ship	State	Description
Polly & Eliza	United States	The ship was abandoned in the Atlantic Ocean. Her crew were rescued by Sir Charles McCarthy (United Kingdom).
Pomona	United Kingdom	The brig was abandoned in the Atlantic Ocean. Her crew were rescued by Traveller (United Kingdom). Pomona was on a voyage from Quebec City, Lower Canada, British North America to Peterhead, Aberdeenshire.
Telemachus	United States	The ship was abandoned in the Atlantic Ocean. Her crew were rescued by Sir Charles McCarthy (United Kingdom).

== 27 September ==
List of shipwrecks: 27 September 1826
Ship	State	Description
Ceres	United Kingdom	The brig was wrecked on Tory Island, County Donegal. Her crew were rescued. She was on a voyage from Limerick to Liverpool, Lancashire.
Experiment	United Kingdom	The ship was beached at Great Yarmouth, Norfolk. She was later refloated and taken in to Great Yarmouth.
Lark	United Kingdom	The ship was driven ashore near Duncansby Head, Aberdeenshire. She was on a voyage from Liverpool, Lancashire to Pärnu, Russia. Lark was refloated and taken in to Stromness, Orkney Islands in a sinking condition.
Peggy	United Kingdom	The ship foundered off Cape Breton Island, Nova Scotia, British North America. She was on a voyage from Bristol, Gloucestershire to Quebec City, Lower Canada, British North America.

== 28 September ==
List of shipwrecks: 28 September 1826
Ship	State	Description
Catharina Maria	Denmark	The brig was severely damaged in a gale at Montevideo, Uruguay.
Jane	United States	The ship was driven ashore and wrecked on Faial Island, Azores.
Superb	United States	The ship was driven ashore and wrecked on Faial Island. She was on a voyage from Virginia to Madeira.
Wilfred	United States	The brig was wrecked on the San José Rocks, near Montevideo.

== 29 September ==
List of shipwrecks: 29 September 1826
Ship	State	Description
Ariel	United Kingdom	The ship was abandoned in the Atlantic Ocean. Her crew were rescued by New Semphonia (United States). Ariel was on a voyage from Havana, Cuba to Gibraltar.
George	United Kingdom	The brig was driven ashore and wrecked on Copeland Island, in Belfast Lough. Her crew were rescued. She was on a voyage from Antigua to Belfast, County Down.
John Richard	United Kingdom	The ship ran aground near St Alban's Head, Dorset, where she was subsequently wrecked. Her crew were rescued. She was on a voyage from Grenada to London.

== 30 September ==
List of shipwrecks: 30 September 1826
Ship	State	Description
John	United Kingdom	The ship was driven ashore between Harrington and Workington, Cumberland. She was on a voyage from Dublin to Whitehaven, Cumberland. John was refloated on 6 October and taken in to Harrington in a severely damaged condition.
Mary Ann	United Kingdom	The ship struck the Theddlethorpe Knowl, in the North Sea off the coast of Lincolnshire and foundered. Her crew were rescued.

== Unknown date ==
List of shipwrecks: Unknown date in September 1826
Ship	State	Description
Agenoria	United Kingdom	The ship was wrecked on the Anholt Reef, in the Kattegat with the loss of three lives. She was on a voyage from Lübeck to London.
Caledonia	United Kingdom	The ship departed from Riga, Russia, for Leith, Lothian. She was run down and sunk in the Baltic Sea by a Russian Navy frigate on or before 11 September. Her crew were rescued by the frigate.
Dwina	Russia	The ship capsized at Bristol, Gloucestershire, United Kingdom. She was later refloated.
Earl Wellington	United Kingdom	The sloop was wrecked off Sanda Island, Argyllshire before 8 September. She was on a voyage from Liverpool, Lancashire to Londonderry.
Fairy	United States	The ship was scuttled off the coast of Labrador British North America after her crew had murdered her captain and mate. She was on a voyage from Boston, Massachusetts to Gothenburg, Sweden.
Helen	United Kingdom	The ship was run down and sunk in the North Sea off Robin Hoods Bay, Yorkshire with the loss of a crew member. She was on a voyage from Hull, Yorkshire to Glasgow, Renfrewshire.
Herminie	France	The ship was lost near "Vaquerre". She was on a voyage from Saint Petersburg, Russia to a French port.
James	(United Kingdom of Great Britain and Ireland) New South Wales	The schooner was wrecked on King Island.
James & Catherine	United Kingdom	The ship was driven ashore and damaged. She was on a voyage from Saint Petersburg to Greenock, Renfrewshire. James & Catherine was refloated and put into Hamina, Grand Duchy of Finland in a waterlogged condition.
Jetaka Catharina	Netherlands	The ship was driven ashore at Ringkøbing, Denmark. Her crew were rescued. She was on a voyage from Havre de Grâce, Seine-Inférieure, France to a Baltic port.
Norval	United Kingdom	The ship was wrecked at Belfast, County Antrim.
Sir Edward Strettle	United Kingdom	The transport ship was wrecked on the "Island of Gomez" off the Aceh Sultanate with the loss of twenty lives. She was on a voyage from Rangoon Burma to Madras, India.
Sutton	United Kingdom	The brig was wrecked in the Turks Islands in early September. Her crew were rescued. She was on a voyage from an American port to Jamaica.
Trinidad	Chile	The ship foundered in the Pacific Ocean whilst on a voyage from Valparaíso to a Peruvian port.
