= Chinese balloon =

Chinese balloon may refer to:

- Sky lantern, small hot-air balloon launched for festivities, historically also used for communication and militarily
- 2023 Chinese balloon incident, a high-altitude balloon discovered floating above North America, subsequently shot down by the U.S. military
- 2023 Chinese balloon over Costa Rica, Colombia, Venezuela; see List of high-altitude object events in 2023

== See also ==
- Balloon (2019 Chinese film) (Chinese: 气球), a Chinese film
- Balloon (disambiguation)
