= Balloon (disambiguation) =

A balloon is a flexible container for (partially or fully) confining a gas.

Balloon may also refer to:

== Arts, entertainment, and media ==
=== Films ===
- Balloon (2017 film), a Tamil film by Sinish starring Jai, Anjali, and Janani Iyer
- Balloon (2018 film), a German film about the East German balloon escape
- Balloon (2019 American film), a 2019 U.S. short film
- Balloon (2019 Chinese film), a Chinese drama film
- The Balloon, a 1946 Swedish comedy film

=== Music ===
==== Artists ====
- Balloon (band), English musical duo
- Keina Suda, Japanese musician also known under the name Balloon

==== Songs ====
- "Balloons" (song), by Foals, 2007
- "Balloons", by TVXQ from "O"-Jung.Ban.Hap., 2006
- "Balloon", by Tyler, The Creator from Chromakopia, 2024
- "99 Red Balloons", "99 Luftballons", by Nena, 1983

=== Other arts, entertainment, and media ===
- Balloon (game)
- Balloon (Merse), 1878 painting by Pál Szinyei Merse
- "Balloons", an episode of The Flumps
- Balloon, a TV ident for BBC Two from 1993 to 1997
- BBC One 'Balloon' idents, better known as simply "Balloon", a series of television idents for BBC One from 1997 to 2002
- Balloon, member of one of the classes of fairy chess pieces
- Speech balloon, including thought balloon, scream balloon, etc.
- Balloon Battle, a gameplay mode in Nintendo's Mario Kart series
- "Balloon" (Beavis and Butt-Head), a 1993 television episode
- "Balloon" (Servant), a 2020 television episode
- "Balloons" (The Flumps), a children's television episode
- "The Balloon", an episode of the TV series Pocoyo
- "The Balloons", an episode of the TV series King Rollo

== Computing and technology ==
- Balloon help, a help system introduced by Apple Computer in their 1991 release of System 7.0
- Balloon, blown up short pin able to carry an indicating letter within as markers for positions on maps, as in Google Maps
- Balloon hashing, a key derivation function to compute hashes for passwords

== Economics and finance ==
- Balloon payment mortgage
- Balloon, economic bubble

== Transportation ==
- Balloon loop, a track system to allow trains to reverse direction
- English Electric Balloon tram, type of double-deck tramcar used in Blackpool, England

== Other uses ==
- Balloon (typeface)
- Balloon effect, primarily in drug interdiction, where success against a problem in one place or form displaces it somewhere else
- Construction technique of balloon framing
- Mount Balloon, a mountain in New Zealand
- Snifter, sometimes called a brandy balloon
- Trial balloon, action to covertly gauge public interest
- Balloon, a troop from the mobile games Clash of Clans and Clash Royale

== See also ==
- Air balloon (disambiguation)
- Ballon (disambiguation)
- Ballooning (disambiguation)
- Balun, an impedance converter
- Blimp
- Bloons
- List of balloon uses, terms containing the word
- Pig bladder
- Pneumatic bladder
