= Air Balloon (ship) =

Several ships have been named Air Balloon for the Montgolfier Brothers' 1783 hot air balloon:

- Air Balloon (1784 ship) was launched in 1784 at Yarmouth as a coaster. She was captured in 1797. She then disappeared from United Kingdom records until 1824. She was almost rebuilt in 1825, only to suffer a major maritime incident in 1826. She was refloated and resumed sailing, but was wrecked in 1829.
- Air Balloon (1784 Hull ship) was launched in 1784 at Hull. She traded between Hull and Petersburg until a French privateer captured her in 1797.
