= Ballooning =

Ballooning may refer to:

- Hot air ballooning
- Balloon (aeronautics)
- Ballooning (spider)
- Ballooning degeneration, a disease
- Memory ballooning

== See also ==
- Balloon (disambiguation)
