= Vanilla Twilight =

Single by Owl City

from the album Ocean Eyes
- Released: January 26, 2010
- Genre: Synth-pop
- Length: 3:51 (album version); 4:04 (top 40 edit)
- Label: Universal Republic
- Songwriter: Adam Young
- Producer: Adam Young

Owl City singles chronology
"Fireflies" (2009)	"Vanilla Twilight" (2010)	"Umbrella Beach" (2010)

Audio sample
- file; help

Music video
- "Vanilla Twilight" on YouTube

"Vanilla Twilight" is a song by American electronica act Owl City. The song was released on January 26, 2010, as the second single from his second studio album Ocean Eyes. "Vanilla Twilight" attained chart placement prior to the release date, debuting at number 95 on the Billboard Hot 100 in November 2009, following the success of Owl City's previous single "Fireflies". The song re-entered the Billboard Hot 100, peaking at number 72.

== Background ==
In an interview with Female First, Adam Young stated that the song is "about a girl." He further explained the song's meaning in an interview with Buzzgrinder: "I met the most charming girl imaginable when I was in high school and most of my 'cozy' songs are about her. She moved away to college for a few years and we kind of lost touch. She and I recently started talking to each other again and life has a way of reshaping sometimes. I'm absolutely crazy about her."

== Composition ==
Written and produced by Young, the track runs at 84 BPM and is in the key of B major, with a key change to D-flat major in the last chorus. Young's range in the song spans from the notes F#3 to Gb4. The song is one of the oldest tracks from Ocean Eyes as it was written in 2007. When the album needed a ballad, Young tweaked some lyrics and it "fitted perfectly." According to Young via Twitter, he stated, "'Vanilla Twilight' is about telling the person you love the most, 'I wish you were here with me.'"

== Music video ==
The music video for "Vanilla Twilight" premiered on March 22, 2010. The video uses the album version of the song and features a cameo appearance by Shaquille O'Neal. The video was directed by Steve Hoover and was filmed on location in Pittsburgh, Pennsylvania, and at the Marblehead Lighthouse in Ohio.

The video shows various people and a dog witness in awe, staring at a swirling mammatus cloud formation associated with a squall line. It has a well-defined vortex which is lit by a veiled sun on an overcast day after a snowfall has blanketed the area, displaying a vanilla twilight. Midway through the video the storm and a lighthouse glimmer with aurora colors. Towards the end of the video O'Neal lifts his arms towards the cloud and mouths "Take me with you."

== Chart performance ==
On the chart of November 7, 2009, the same week "Fireflies" hit No. 1, "Vanilla Twilight" debuted on No. 95 in the Billboard Hot 100. It has since re-entered and peaked on the Hot 100 at No. 72.

"Vanilla Twilight" first entered the Australian Singles Chart at No. 50 on the week ending January 11, 2010, which happened to coincide with "Fireflies" holding its reign as the No. 1 hit single. The song later peaked at No. 44.

Following the release of Ocean Eyes, "Vanilla Twilight" entered the UK Singles Chart at a current peak of No. 94, making it Owl City's second consecutive single to enter the UK Top 100.

== Track listing ==
European CD single
No.	Title	Length
1.	"Vanilla Twilight" (radio version)	4:04
2.	"Vanilla Twilight" (extended radio version)	4:17

Digital download
No.	Title	Length
1.	"Vanilla Twilight" (radio edit)	4:04

7" vinyl
No.	Title	Length
1.	"Fireflies" (UK radio edit)	3:14
2.	"Vanilla Twilight" (US extended radio edit)	4:20

== Charts ==
=== Weekly charts ===
Weekly chart performance for "Vanilla Twilight"
Chart (2009–10)	Peak position
Australia (ARIA)	44
Belgium (Ultratip Bubbling Under Flanders)	2
Belgium (Ultratip Bubbling Under Wallonia)	17
Canada (Canadian Hot 100)	74
Czech Republic Airplay (ČNS IFPI)	37
Denmark (Tracklisten)	24
Italy Radio Airplay (EarOne)	95
Latvia (European Hit Radio)	27
Netherlands (Dutch Top 40)	20
New Zealand (Recorded Music NZ)	36
Scottish Singles Sales (Official Charts)	66
Singapore Airplay (Mediacorp)	1
South Africa (Mediaguide)	10
UK Singles (Official Charts)	94
US Billboard Hot 100	72
US Dance Singles Sales (Billboard)	9
US Pop Airplay (Billboard)	36
US Rock Digital Song Sales (Billboard)	14

=== Year-end charts ===
Year-end chart performance for "Vanilla Twilight"
Chart (2010)	Position
Netherlands (Dutch Top 40)	135
US Rock Digital Song Sales (Billboard)	42

== Certifications ==
Certification and sales for "Vanilla Twilight"
Region	Certification	Certified units/sales
United States (RIAA)	Platinum	1,000,000^{‡}
^{‡} Sales+streaming figures based on certification alone.

== Release history ==
Release dates for "Vanilla Twilight"
Region	Date	Format	Label	Ref.
United States	January 26, 2010	Contemporary hit radio	Universal Republic	
Various	January 26, 2010	Digital download	Universal Republic	
