= Balloon (Merse) =

Coordinates: 47.4911°N 19.0628°E

The balloon
- Léghajó (Hungarian)
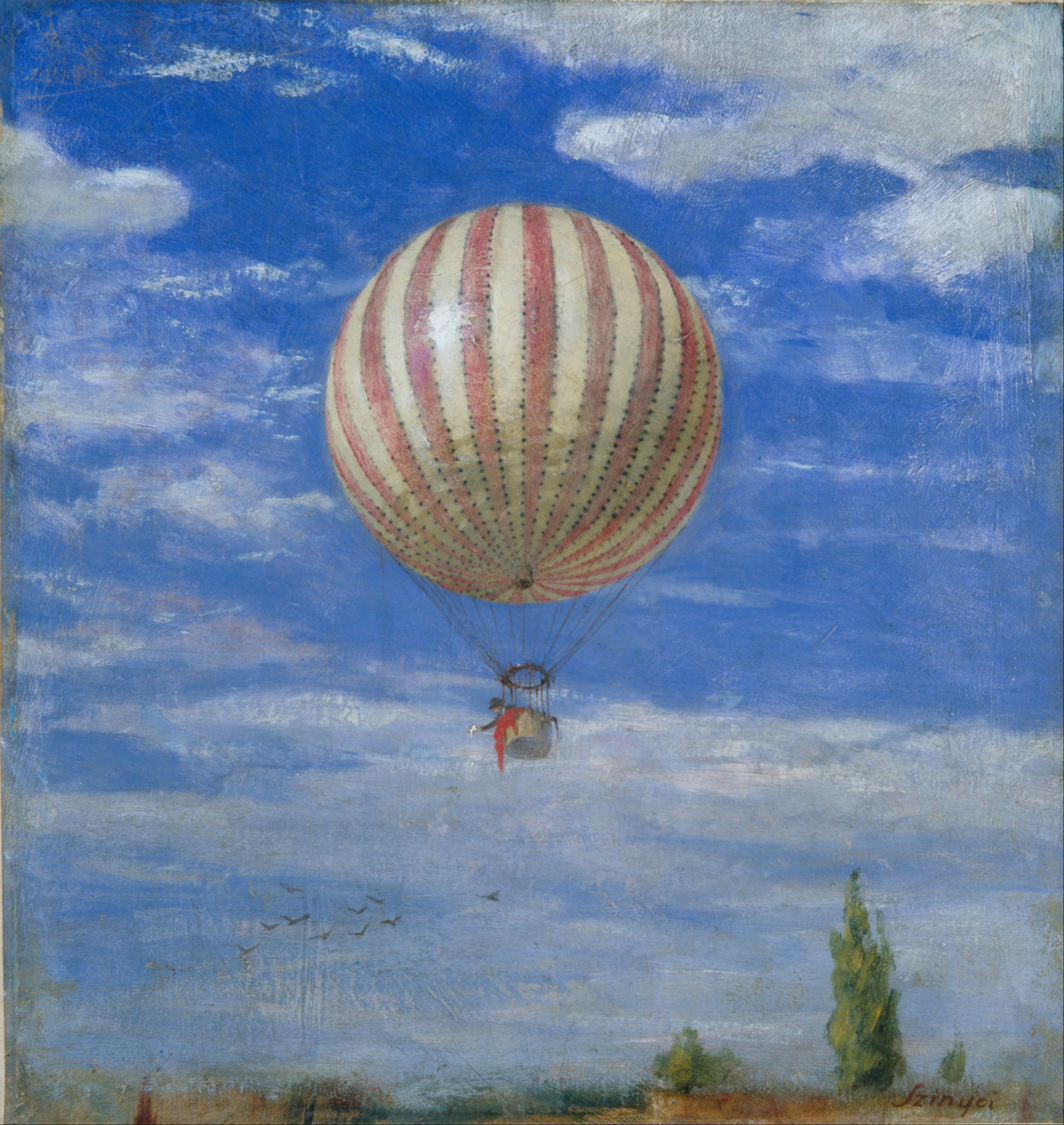
- Artist: Pál Szinyei Merse
- Year: 1873
- Medium: oil on canvas
- Dimensions: 42 cm × 39.3 cm (17 in × 15.5 in)
- Location: Hungarian National Museum, Budapest

The Balloon (in Hungarian: Léghajó) is a work of art by Hungarian artist Pál Szinyei Merse from 1878.

== Description ==
The picture is oil on canvas and has dimensions of 42 x 39.3 cm. The picture is part of the collection of the Hungarian National Museum in Budapest, Hungary.

== Analysis ==
The work was inspired by a balloon trip taken by the brother-in-law of the artist after leaving Munich in May 1873, when he returned to his birthplace in Hungary. Like many of his countrymen, he travelled to France to study contemporary arts. After returning to Hungary, he married due to family care fails to implement many of their creative thinking. In 1878 he began to paint pictures full of optimism, a symbol of boldness and youth. Many of his works included themes of technological progress and innovation. His painting "bubble" symbolizes progress, as in the air one forgets about all your petty problems and develop your imagination. In his painting overcame gravity marked human thought as flight and creative freedom.
