= Umbrella Beach =

Single by Owl City

from the album Ocean Eyes
- Released: May 17, 2010
- Genre: Electropop
- Length: 3:50 (Album Version); 3:23 (Radio Edit)
- Label: Universal Republic
- Songwriter: Adam Young
- Producer: Adam Young

Owl City singles chronology
| "Vanilla Twilight" (2010) | "Umbrella Beach" (2010) | "Middledistancerunner" (2010) |

Audio sample
- file; help

Music video
- "Umbrella Beach" on YouTube

"Umbrella Beach" is a song by American electronica act Owl City. The song was released as the third single from his second studio album, Ocean Eyes on May 17, 2010. It is also the second UK single released from the album.

The album cover is a picture of the beach at Santa Monica, California, taken from the Santa Monica Pier.

== Background and release ==
Speaking with Female First, Young stated that the song is about, "a hermit living in a box car on the edge of the shoreline that corroded so badly, it wound up at the bottom of the bay. Rather than finding a new home, the hermit chooses to learn to scuba dive and now spends his days deep under the waves in his boxcar".

"Umbrella Beach" was originally released as a promotional single on November 22, 2009, preceding the release of the official first single "Fireflies." The promotional release is a remix of the song made by Long Lost Sun. An exclusive remix created by Kenny Hayes is included on the single release.

== Critical reception ==
Professional ratings
Review scores
| Source | Rating |
|---|---|
| BBC | 3/5 stars |
| Digital Spy | 4/5 stars |

The song was met with mixed reviews from music critics. Robert Copsey of Digital Spy gave the song a positive review stating, "By essentially re-working the best bits of 'Fireflies' and cranking up the BPM a few notches, Young has fashioned another stellar indie-folk-electro smash that should encourage even the most stubborn toe-tapper to have a jump around." Tris McCall of NJ.com complimented the song with a review title of "Song of the Day" and focused on its sound, stating, "With Owl City, he uses heavy-duty teenpop synthesizers. If you can't get past those, 'Umbrella Beach' isn't going to reach you."

Fraser McAlpine of BBC Radio gave a mixed review rewarding the song a 3 out of 5 star rating. He remarked, "I find I'm grateful for the blasts of syntrumpet, for the backwash of Netto Pet Shop Boys synthpop, cos they're doing what the coffee has long since failed at, namely keeping my brain focused. I also find the lyrics start to make a crazy sort of sense, in the way that unreasoned things tend to sparkle in the middle of the night." Miranda Nelson of The Georgia Straight called the track "unlistenable," consisting of "rave-friendly trance beats and sugary Jonas Brother–style composition."

== Chart performance ==
"Umbrella Beach" entered the UK Dance Chart on the week ending May 8, 2010, at number 25, later peaking at number 12. The song also debuted at number 16, before reaching number six on the chart.

== Music video ==
The music video for "Umbrella Beach" premiered on April 16, 2010, via YouTube and was directed by Alexander Brown. The video tells about a boy who is trying to build a plane to cross the sea and go to another island. At the end of the video, a group of his friends help him push the plane down a hill for takeoff. It is not shown whether or not the plane successfully flies. Adam Young did not appear in the music video apart from photos on a table. The video was filmed in Hope Cove, England. The plane used in the video was created by Robin Crowley.

== Track listing ==
Digital download
| No. | Title | Length |
|---|---|---|
| 1. | "Umbrella Beach" | 3:50 |
| 2. | "Umbrella Beach" (Kenny Hayes remix) | 6:10 |

Promo single
| No. | Title | Length |
|---|---|---|
| 1. | "Umbrella Beach" (Long Lost Sun remix) | 3:25 |

== Charts ==
Chart performance for "Umbrella Beach"
| Chart (2010) | Peak position |
|---|---|
| Singapore Airplay (Mediacorp) | 6 |
| UK Airplay (Music Week) | 6 |
| UK Dance (Official Charts) | 12 |
| UK Singles (OCC) | 110 |

== Release history ==
Release dates for "Umbrella Beach"
| Region | Date | Format | Label | Ref. |
|---|---|---|---|---|
| United Kingdom | May 17, 2010 | CD single | Universal Republic | |
| Australia | May 24, 2010 | CD single | Universal Republic | |
