= Hello Seattle =

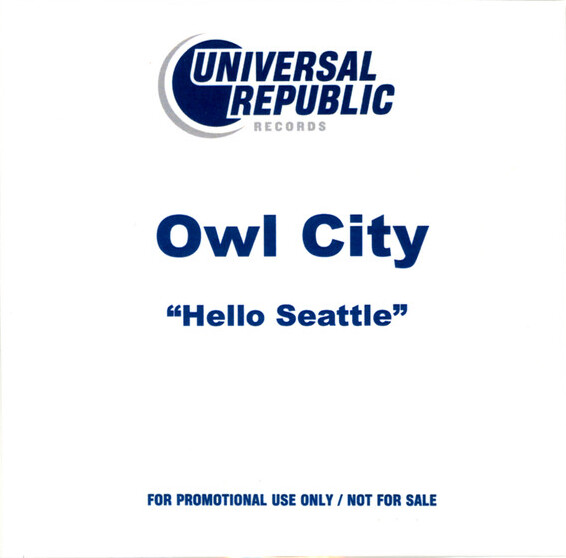

Promotional single by Owl City

from the album Ocean Eyes
- Released: December 2009
- Genre: Electropop; synth-pop
- Length: 2:47
- Label: Universal Republic
- Songwriter: Adam Young
- Producer: Young

"Hello Seattle" is a song by American electronica project Owl City. The song is the third track from his second studio album Ocean Eyes released via Universal Republic. The song was released as a promotional CD in December 2009, before it was serviced for radio airplay on April 27, 2010. Despite not being released as a single, the song reached six million plays on MySpace. It also peaked at number six on the US Bubbling Under Hot 100 chart and was certified Gold in 2014 by the Recording Industry Association of America.

== Background ==
Adam Young spoke about the song's meaning with Female First:

"'Hello Seattle' is a song about growing up in Minnesota, imagining what the city of Seattle was like without having visited. It's about daydreams and imaginings where you are things that dwell in/around the Emerald City, thus giving the listener a first person view.

Young described "Hello Seattle" as a love song to a place he had never visited. He stated that never travelling to the city was a "pretty big inspiration" to him. Once he got the chance to visit the city, Young recalled that the experience "wasn't anything like the place in my head, it was just different." The song gained viral popularity on MySpace and earned Young a record contract with Universal Republic.

== Composition ==
Written and produced by Young, the track runs at 90 BPM and is in the key of B-flat major. Young's range in the song spans from the notes F4 to G5. It is the first song he wrote under the Owl City name. On a night when Young couldn't sleep, he had an idea for an electronic track that came to be "Hello Seattle". He described the song as a "representative" of the type of music he wanted to make. He also stated, "It's innocent, accessible pop, but with a melancholy feel and abstract lyrics." In addition to the lyrics being about Young's imagination of everything he dreamed the city to be, it also references his faith to God.

== Versions ==
"Hello Seattle" first appeared on his debut EP Of June with a runtime of two minutes and 57 seconds. The song was later remastered for his second studio album Ocean Eyes with a runtime of two minutes and 47 seconds. A remix version of the song was also featured on the album.

== Critical reception ==
"Hello Seattle" was met with generally positive reviews from music critics. Scott Fryberger of Jesus Freak Hideout described the track as "dance friendly." He stated, "The piano at the beginning is a nice touch to get the jam started... it never gets boring as some dance floor hits tend to." AllMusic's Andrew Leahey remarked, "such syrupy sweetness builds to a feverish pitch." A negative review came from Hollis Wong-Wear of the Seattle Weekly. She criticized Young's "overprocessed vocals," as well as the song's lyrics. She also added, "Owl City bites Ben Gibbard's style so hard, contorting Gibbard's earnest lightness."

== Charts ==
Chart performance for "Hello Seattle"
Chart (2010–12)	Peak position
South Korea International (GAON)	200
US Bubbling Under Hot 100 Singles (Billboard)	6

== Certifications ==
Certification and sales for "Hello Seattle"
Region	Certification	Certified units/sales
United States (RIAA)	Gold	500,000^{‡}
^{‡} Sales+streaming figures based on certification alone.

== Release history ==
Release history for "Hello Seattle"
Region	Date	Format	Label	Ref.
United States	December 2009	CD	Republic	
United States	April 27, 2010	Contemporary hit radio	Republic	
