= Fireflies (Owl City song) =

2009 single by Owl City

Single by Owl City

from the album Ocean Eyes
- B-side: "Hot Air Balloon"
- Released: July 14, 2009
- Studio: Sky Harbor (Owatonna, Minnesota)
- Genre: Synth-pop; indie pop; electropop
- Length: 3:48
- Label: Universal Republic
- Songwriter: Adam Young
- Producers: Adam Young; Matt Thiessen

Owl City singles chronology
"Fireflies" (2009)	"Vanilla Twilight" (2010)

Music video
- "Fireflies" on YouTube

"Fireflies" is the 2009 debut single from American electronica project Owl City's album Ocean Eyes. It was released digitally on July 14, 2009, before it was serviced for radio airplay on September 1. Frontman Adam Young wrote the track about seeing fireflies in his hometown of Owatonna, Minnesota while he was awake with insomnia. Young produced the song alongside Matt Thiessen, who also provided guest vocals. The song is built around a "bleepy" synthline and includes lyrics about insomnia, fireflies and summer.

"Fireflies" topped the Billboard Hot 100 for two non-consecutive weeks. Outside of the United States, "Fireflies" also topped the charts in Australia, Denmark, Finland, Ireland, the Netherlands, Norway, Sweden, and the United Kingdom. "Fireflies" was Owl City's only top 10 hit on the Billboard Hot 100 until three years later when "Good Time", a duet with Canadian singer Carly Rae Jepsen, peaked at number eight on the chart. It has been covered by Christina Grimmie, Cheryl Cole and others.

"Fireflies" is featured in the video game Disney Sing It: Party Hits, and was used in the promotional video for EyePet. It is available as downloadable content for Guitar Hero 5, Guitar Hero: Warriors of Rock and Rock Band 3. The song was released as a free download on the game Tap Tap Revenge 3 by Tapulous.

== Background and release ==
"Fireflies" was posted onto Spinner and Spin as part of a single-a-month campaign. According to Owl City's manager Steve Bursky, the song was not intended to be released as a single. Similarly, Adam Young felt that the song never "stood out" to him, however, it gained online popularity and resonated with people. As a result, Bursky said "it was an opportunity we couldn't pass up." Due to its digital success, the song was sent to alternative radio by the end of July. The track was later sent to contemporary hit radio on September 1, 2009.

Speaking about how the song connected with people, Young stated, "a lot of folks say that they feel kind of connected to a certain sense of innocence with the song. I think there's a kind of pure innocence to it, and I think that sort of fueled the fire and really made people feel uplifted or inspired or kind of just optimistic about things."

== Composition ==
Lasting for 3 minutes and 48 seconds, "Fireflies" is centered on Young's struggle with insomnia; he first developed the song "awake in the early hours of the morning" to occupy his mind. It was also inspired by a camping trip he took up to a "totally rustic and kind of remote lake in northern Minnesota"; he tried to emulate the experience of seeing a meteor shower that gave him "a cool idea of shooting stars being fireflies." Young was living with his parents, and recorded most of the song in their unfinished basement. The song is layered with dozens of instrumental tracks, including its drum loop, piano, organ, synthesizer, vibraphone, violin, viola, and cello, which was performed by a cellist Young hired. He recorded electric guitar overlays for the second and third choruses but did not own an amplifier, so he plugged the instrument directly into his computer. The song features guest vocals from Matt Thiessen of Relient K, who Young had been a fan of since he was in high school.

The song's BPM count is 90, and its key is E♭ Major. Musically, the track is described as electropop, indie pop and synth-pop.

== Critical reception ==
Professional ratings
Review scores
Source	Rating
About.com	4/5 stars
AltSounds	(61%)
Billboard	4.5/5 stars

"Fireflies" was generally well received by music critics. Ben Sheehan of Billboard called the track, "a welcome refreshment." Praising the song for being "uniquely constructed," he also added, "it's the pianos and guitars that really crack the song wide open." In another positive review, Nick Levine of Digital Spy remarked, "there's nothing twee or cutesy about the socking great chorus Young unleashes here." Caroline Sullivan at The Guardian called the tune "unfeasibly bouncy". Bill Lamb of About.com remarked, "The power in 'Fireflies' is not simply in its whimsy. Creative musical arrangements distinguish Owl City from a crowd of solo musical projects." AltSounds stated that the song is, "simply built up with a calm, gentle automated vocal alongside some dreamy pimples of teen fantasy." Ben Sisario of The New York Times described the track as "pensive yet bubbly."

The song was widely compared to the music of synth-pop duo the Postal Service; Young denied it was his goal to emulate their sound or vocalist Ben Gibbard. Ian Cohen of Pitchfork called it an extraordinarily "obvious" lift of their sound. Gabriela Tully Claymore, writing for Stereogum in 2017, remembered it as "diet Postal Service". The CBC called the track a "soppy ballad," criticizing the song's arrangement and lyrics.

== Chart performance ==
"Fireflies", when featured as iTunes' free "Single of the Week," garnered 650,000 downloads, influencing Universal Republic to move Ocean Eyes' release date from September 1, 2009, to July 28. In its first week of release, the song sold 68,392 units. The song debuted on the Billboard Hot 100 in early-September at No. 97. The song reached No. 1 during its tenth week, becoming Owl City's first No. 1 single and shifting 200,000 digital copies that week. The song stayed at No. 1 for two non-consecutive weeks, in the top ten for fifteen weeks and on the Hot 100 for 31 weeks. "Fireflies" contributed to sales of the album Ocean Eyes, and was credited as being responsible for its entry to the top ten on the U.S. Billboard 200. The song became one of the top 10 best-selling songs of 2009 in the US with 2,748,000 digital units sold by the end of that year. On the Billboard Hot 100 2009 year-end chart, it was ranked sixtieth. On the Billboard Hot 100 2010 year-end chart, it was ranked thirtieth. The RIAA certified "Fireflies" 3× Platinum in June 2010. On January 25, 2023, the song was certified Diamond by the RIAA denoting sales of 10 million units. The song became the 99th song in history to become certified Diamond by the RIAA.

The song attained success worldwide. In the United Kingdom, "Fireflies" debuted at number 50 on the UK Singles Chart. The song would go on to make a 48-place jump to number two the following week, beaten only to the top by "Replay" by Iyaz. The following week, it rose to number one and topped the chart for three consecutive weeks. On January 2, 2011, The Official Charts Company revealed that "Fireflies" was Britain's 20th most downloaded song of all time. As of September 2017, the song has sold over 844,000 copies in the United Kingdom.

In Australia, the song entered at No. 38 and on the week of January 10, 2010, it topped the chart. The song sold over 37,354 copies in Australia. It was the second most-played song on Australian radio in 2010, according to the Phonographic Performance Company of Australia. In Japan, the song peaked at No. 3 and was ranked sixteenth on the 2010 year-end chart. It reached No. 1 in Denmark, Ireland, Sweden, Australia, the United Kingdom and the Netherlands (for 10 weeks) and the top ten in Austria, Belgium, Canada, Poland, Finland, Germany, New Zealand, Norway, Portugal, and Switzerland. As of September 2012, the song sold over 5 million copies worldwide. In March 2025, the single reached one billion streams on Spotify.

== Music video ==
The music video for "Fireflies" premiered on July 21, 2009 and was directed by Steve Hoover. It features Adam Young playing the song on a Lowrey spinet organ in a toy-filled bedroom, where most of the toys (including Robie Sr.; a Tyrannosaurus rex; a Speak & Spell; toy cars, including one based on the UK children's TV character Brum; and a blimp) come to life. Most of the toys are older model toys, with most of them from the 1970s and 1980s (the exceptions being a RoboSapien and a Roboraptor). There are also vintage household devices such as a black-and-white television and a record player. As the song begins, Young presses a "magic" button on the organ's control panel, turning on various lamps and lanterns throughout the room, some shaped uniquely (e.g., one shaped like a lemon, and one like a hot-air balloon). The toys become sentient during the second verse, moving faster and more erratically as the song progresses towards the end. Once Young presses the "magic" button again, the toys deactivate and the room goes dark. The video ends with Young turning off his organ as the camera fades to black. The music video gained rotation on VH1 and MTV.

As of November 2026, the music video had accumulated over 643 million views on YouTube.

== Legacy ==
"Fireflies" was an inescapable hit; Spin columnist Rob Arcand wrote that the tune "cascaded throughout the world, inescapable in public spaces in the years that followed. Something about its mawkish, saccharine lyrics were so flawlessly inoffensive as to make it the perfect song for light-rock radio, and the track rippled through airwaves in malls, airports, commercials, and public transit until even the most earnest fans grew a little tired."

=== Internet meme ===
In May 2017, the song was repurposed as an Internet meme, usually involving the song being played at an extremely loud volume or being remixed to fit a certain theme. Another variant of the meme involved writing a pun for the line "You would not believe your eyes, if ten million fireflies". The song received further notability in June when Owl City was asked to interpret the lyric "I get a thousand hugs from 10,000 lightning bugs." Following its virality as an internet meme, the song re-entered the Billboard charts at number eight on the US Rock Streaming Songs chart.

== Awards and nominations ==
Awards and nominations for "Fireflies"
Year	Organization	Award	Result	Ref(s)
2010	Q Awards	Best Track	Nominated	
2010	The Record of the Year	Record of the Year	Won	
2010	Billboard Japan Music Awards	Hot 100 Airplay of the Year	Won	
2010	Billboard Japan Music Awards	Adult Contemporary of the Year	Nominated	
2011	Flecking Awards	Best Video	Nominated	
2011	BDS Certified Spin Awards	400,000 Spins	Won	
2013	Vevo Certified Awards	100,000,000 Views	Won	

=== Accolades ===
Accolades for "Fireflies"
Publication	Country	Accolade	Year	Rank	Ref.
AOL Radio	United States	Top 10 Songs of 2009	2009	9	
About.com	United States	Top 100 Songs of 2009	2009	10	
About.com	United States	Top 100 Songs of the 2000s	2009	97	
idobi Radio	United States	Top 50 Songs of 2009	2009	2	

== Track listing ==
CD single
No.	Title	Length
1.	"Fireflies"	3:48

European CD single
No.	Title	Length
1.	"Fireflies"	3:48
2.	"Hot Air Balloon"	3:35

Digital download
No.	Title	Length
1.	"Fireflies" (UK radio edit)	3:14

7" vinyl
No.	Title	Length
1.	"Fireflies" (UK radio edit)	3:14
2.	"Vanilla Twilight" (US extended radio edit)	4:20

== Personnel ==
Owl City

- Adam Young – lead vocals, piano, guitar, synthesizer, bass, drum programmer, percussion, producer, engineer

Additional musicians and production

- Matthew Thiessen – additional vocals, drum programmer, production
- Phil Peterson – cello
- Ted Jensen – mastering
- John Goodmanson – audio mixer

== Charts and certifications ==
=== Weekly charts ===
Weekly chart performance for "Fireflies"
Chart (2009–2010)	Peak position
Australia (ARIA)	1
Austria (Ö3 Austria Top 40)	2
Belgium (Ultratop 50 Flanders)	2
Belgium (Ultratop 50 Wallonia)	4
Canada (Canadian Hot 100)	2
Canada AC (Billboard)	7
Canada CHR/Top 40 (Billboard)	5
Canada Hot AC (Billboard)	1
CIS Airplay (TopHit)	66
Croatia (HRT)	1
Czech Republic Airplay (ČNS IFPI)	2
Denmark (Tracklisten)	1
Denmark Airplay (Tracklisten)	1
Europe (European Hot 100 Singles)	3
Finland (Suomen virallinen lista)	7
France (SNEP)	17
Germany (GfK)	6
Germany (Airplay Chart)	1
Hungary (Editors' Choice Top 40)	4
Ireland (IRMA)	1
Israel International Airplay (Media Forest)	2
Italy (FIMI)	2
Italy (Musica e Dischi)	16
Japan (Japan Hot 100)	3
Latvia (European Hit Radio)	1
Lithuania (European Hit Radio)	1
Luxembourg Digital Song Sales (Billboard)	3
Mexico Ingles Airplay (Billboard)	8
Netherlands (Dutch Top 40)	1
Netherlands (Single Top 100)	3
New Zealand (Recorded Music NZ)	2
Norway (VG-lista)	2
Poland Airplay (ZPAV)	2
Portugal Digital Song Sales (Billboard)	4
Russia Airplay (Tophit)	58
Scottish Singles Sales (Official Charts)	1
Slovakia Airplay (ČNS IFPI)	8
South Korea International (GAON)	75
Spain (Promusicae)	27
Sweden (Sverigetopplistan)	1
Switzerland (Schweizer Hitparade)	4
UK Singles (Official Charts)	1
US Billboard Hot 100	1
US Adult Contemporary (Billboard)	11
US Adult Pop Airplay (Billboard)	1
US Hot Christian Songs (Billboard)	44
US Hot Rock & Alternative Songs (Billboard)	38
US Pop Airplay (Billboard)	2
Venezuela Top Anglo (Record Report)	3

2017 weekly chart performance for "Fireflies"
Chart (2017)	Peak position
US Rock Streaming Songs (Billboard)	8

2023 chart performance for "Fireflies"
Chart (2023)	Peak position
Estonia Airplay (Tophit)	177

=== Year-end charts ===
2009 year-end chart performance for "Fireflies"
Chart (2009)	Position
Australia (ARIA)	79
Canada (Canadian Hot 100)	74
Denmark (Tracklisten)	29
Netherlands (Dutch Top 40)	100
New Zealand (Recorded Music NZ)	26
US Billboard Hot 100	60

2010 year-end chart performance for "Fireflies"
Chart (2010)	Position
Australia (ARIA)	6
Austria (Ö3 Austria Top 40)	27
Belgium (Ultratop 50 Flanders)	14
Belgium (Ultratop 50 Wallonia)	14
Brazil (Crowley)	37
Canada (Canadian Hot 100)	26
Croatia International Airplay (HRT)	29
Denmark (Tracklisten)	47
Europe (European Hot 100 Singles)	13
France (SNEP)	75
Germany (Media Control Charts)	36
Ireland (IRMA)	7
Italy (FIMI)	93
Italy Airplay (EarOne)	75
Japan (Japan Hot 100)	16
Japan Adult Contemporary (Billboard Japan)	6
Japan Radio Songs (Billboard Japan)	1
Latvia (European Hit Radio)	21
Lithuania (European Hit Radio)	22
Netherlands (Dutch Top 40)	14
Netherlands (Single Top 100)	26
New Zealand (Recorded Music NZ)	44
Sweden (Sverigetopplistan)	24
Switzerland (Schweizer Hitparade)	28
UK Singles (Official Charts Company)	6
US Billboard Hot 100	30
US Adult Contemporary (Billboard)	22
US Adult Top 40 (Billboard)	21
US Mainstream Top 40 (Billboard)	33

2011 year-end chart performance for "Fireflies"
Chart (2011)	Position
US Rock Digital Song Sales (Billboard)	44

2017 year-end chart performance for "Fireflies"
Chart (2017)	Position
US Rock Streaming Songs (Billboard)	38

=== Certifications ===
Certifications for sales for "Fireflies"
Region	Certification	Certified units/sales
Australia (ARIA)	7× Platinum	490,000^{‡}
Belgium (BRMA)	Gold	15,000^{*}
Brazil (Pro-Música Brasil)	Platinum	60,000^{‡}
Canada	—	74,000
Denmark (IFPI Danmark)	2× Platinum	180,000^{‡}
Germany (BVMI)	Platinum	300,000^{‡}
Italy (FIMI)	Gold	15,000^{*}
New Zealand (RMNZ)	4× Platinum	120,000^{‡}
Spain (Promusicae)	Gold	30,000^{‡}
Sweden (GLF)	2× Platinum	40,000^{‡}
Switzerland (IFPI Switzerland)	Gold	15,000^{^}
United Kingdom (BPI)	3× Platinum	1,800,000^{‡}
United States (RIAA)	Diamond	10,000,000^{‡}
^{*} Sales figures based on certification alone.^{^} Shipments figures based on certification alone.^{‡} Sales+streaming figures based on certification alone.

== Release history ==
Release dates for "Fireflies"
Region	Date	Format	Label	Ref.
United States	July 14, 2009	Digital download	Universal Republic	
Canada	July 14, 2009	Digital download	Universal Republic	
United States	September 1, 2009	Contemporary hit radio	Universal Republic	
Italy	November 5, 2009	Contemporary hit radio	Universal Republic	
Australia	November 9, 2009	CD	Universal Republic	
United Kingdom	January 8, 2010	Digital download	Universal Republic	
Ireland	January 14, 2010	Digital download	Universal Republic	
Germany	January 22, 2010	Digital download	Universal Republic	
United Kingdom	February 22, 2010	CD	Universal Republic	

== See also ==
- List of best-selling singles in Australia
- List of Hot 100 number-one singles of 2009 (U.S.)
- List of Hot Adult Top 40 Tracks number-one singles of 2010
- Dutch Top 40 number-one hits of 2009
- List of number-one singles in Australia in 2010
- List of number-one singles from the 2010s (UK)
- List of number-one singles of 2010 (Ireland)
- List of number-one singles (Sweden)
