= Hot Air Balloon (song) =

Promotional single by Owl City

from the album Ocean Eyes
- A-side: "Fireflies"
- Released: May 5, 2009
- Genre: Pop
- Length: 3:35
- Label: Republic
- Songwriter: Adam Young
- Producer: Young

"Hot Air Balloon" is a song by American electronica project Owl City. The song was released digitally on May 5, 2009, as the first promotional single from his second studio album, Ocean Eyes. The song appears as the B-side on the European CD release of his debut single, "Fireflies".

== Background and composition ==
"Hot Air Balloon" was written and produced by Adam Young. The theme of the song is based on abstraction and optimism. Young stated, "Abstraction is something that has always appealed to me... I have an intense dislike for writing about the 'true, hard, reality of life' or being explicitly open and honest about life and love and living. Everyone does that... abstract optimism is an idea that makes the wheels turn in my head. I don't know why. I never planned such a thing." The song is described as pop and features acoustic guitar sounds.

The song premiered on the AOL Spinner Tastemaker website on May 1, 2009. The track was later released as a digital-only promotional single on May 5, 2009. The song later appeared on the deluxe edition of Ocean Eyes. According to Young, the song is a "carefree song about adventure and exploration. Looking down on the world, leaning out and brushing the snow from evergreen branches, wondering where life will take you."

== Critical reception ==
"Hot Air Balloon" was met with generally positive reviews from music critics. Silence Killer gave a positive review stating, "When trouble is spotted in the distance, he can always ascend above the treetops and spend the afternoon in his hot air balloon. Leave your jacket behind, clouds wouldn't dare come between the sunshine and Owl City." Scott Fryberger of Jesus Freak Hideout praised the upbeat and poppy nature of the song and Young's "signature dreamy and peppy lyrics."

== Chart performance ==
The song debuted at number one on AOL Music's Top 40 Songs Chart with more than 270,000 streams in the first week and has sold over 12,400 copies. The song reached number 41 on the South Korean GAON Digital Chart.

== Track listing ==
Digital download
No.	Title	Length
1.	"Hot Air Balloon"	3:35

European CD single
No.	Title	Length
1.	"Fireflies"	3:48
2.	"Hot Air Balloon"	3:35

== Charts ==
Chart performance for "Hot Air Balloon"
Chart (2010)	Peak position
South Korea International (GAON)	41

== Release history ==
Release history for "Hot Air Balloon"
Region	Date	Format	Label	Ref.
Various	May 5, 2009	Digital download	Republic	
