= Ocean Eyes (album) =

Studio album by Owl City
- Released: July 14, 2009
- Recorded: 2007–2009
- Studios: Sky Harbor (Owatonna, Minnesota), Two Sticks Audio (Seattle)
- Genres: Indietronica; synth-pop; electropop
- Length: 42:52
- Label: Universal Republic
- Producer: Adam Young

Owl City chronology
Maybe I'm Dreaming (2008)	Ocean Eyes (2009)	All Things Bright and Beautiful (2011)

Singles from Ocean Eyes
- 1. "Fireflies" Released: July 14, 2009; 2. "Vanilla Twilight" Released: January 26, 2010; 3. "Umbrella Beach" Released: May 17, 2010

Ocean Eyes is the second studio album and major label debut by American electronica project Owl City, released on July 14, 2009, by Universal Republic Records. It features a photograph of the Burj Al Arab as its album artwork. A vinyl edition was released, followed by a deluxe edition available on January 26, 2010. The deluxe edition incorporates four new tracks, including a remix of "Hello Seattle". The album contains guest vocals by Relient K vocalist Matt Thiessen on the songs "Fireflies", "Cave In", "The Bird and the Worm", and "Tidal Wave".

== Background ==
In the 2000s, the works of the Postal Service inspired a wave of emo-influenced synthpop acts such as PlayRadioPlay!, Hellogoodbye, and Owl City. Just before Ocean Eyes's July 2009 release, Owl City garnered two hits on the Top Electronic Albums chart and over 40 million plays on MySpace. Owl City began developing a following on MySpace, which led to Adam Young signing with Universal Republic in February 2009.

On July 14, 2009, the song "Fireflies" was chosen as the Single of the Week by the iTunes Store. This led to a huge success as the song was downloaded over 650,000 times. This success also led to the record company pushing back the release date of the physical copy of the album from July 28, 2009, to September 1, 2009. In October 2009, its lead single, "Fireflies", topped the Billboard Hot 100. The song featured guest vocals from Matt Thiessen of Relient K. Young was also joined by Breanne Düren on several tracks; the most notable example of which is "The Saltwater Room".

The album contains slightly different versions of songs from previous albums, namely "Hello Seattle" from Of June, along with "On the Wing" and "The Saltwater Room" from Maybe I'm Dreaming.

Young revealed the origin of the album's title when he said:

I'm from the middle of nowhere in Minnesota you see, so the ocean has always been a curiously dreamy, ethereal, almost romantic thing to me. Over the years I spent a great deal of time with my eyes closed, imagining myself having the most wonderful adventures by the seaside. Doing things one can only do in dusk and glow and midsummer dreams, as if the back of my closed eyelids were a silver screen and I was a sentimental projectionist with hundreds of fanciful reels at hand, all ready to roll. Thus is the reasoning behind the title.

— Adam Young, Adam Young's blog

== Composition and recording ==
Ocean Eyes was mostly recorded in the basement of Young's parents house, before he got his own place and finished it up there. Inspired by simple decorations, Young uses landscape paintings with a lot of ethereal and dreamy nature photography to create the music on the album. The album was solely created by Young himself, which allowed him to "think more freely." Many of the album's songs feature abstract and imaginary lyrics, such as "Hot Air Balloon", "Hello Seattle", "Cave In" and "Strawberry Avalanche". He also wrote songs about places he's never visited before, such as "Hello Seattle". Other tracks references Young's faith to God, like "Tidal Wave" and "Meteor Shower". He also pointed how the latter was the "most important" track to him. Some songs are more personal such as "Fireflies", a song about Young's struggle with insomnia and "Vanilla Twilight", a song about a girl he met in high school. "The Tip of the Iceberg" is a song he wrote after he spent a month studying natural habitats and the environment.

== Promotion ==
Between May and June 2009, Owl City performed many shows in support of his forthcoming album. In May, Owl City performed at the 2009 Bamboozle festival. In the summer, Owl City embarked on his first headlining tour, as well as opened several dates for Relient K. He later toured in the fall from September to October, before heading to Japan in November 2009. In January 2010, Owl City embarked on the Ocean Eyes Tour in the United States with support from Lights and Deas Vail. A European leg took place from February to March 2010, with Lights joining him again. He returned to North America from March to May 2010. In the summer of 2010, Owl City opened for Maroon 5 and John Mayer. He concluded the Ocean Eyes tour in Australia and New Zealand in November 2010.

== Critical reception ==
Professional ratings
Aggregate scores
Source	Rating
AnyDecentMusic?	4.7/10
Metacritic	53/100
Review scores
Source	Rating
AllMusic	2.5/5 stars
Alternative Press	3/5 stars
The A.V. Club	C−
Clash	3/10
Entertainment Weekly	B+
Evening Standard	3/5 stars
The Guardian	2/5 stars
Q	4/5 stars
Rolling Stone	2/5 stars
Spin	5/10
The Times	3/5 stars

Ocean Eyes received mixed reviews from critics, based on an aggregate Metacritic score of 53/100, indicating "Mixed or average reviews". The album gained some positive reviews, including Entertainment Weekly which gave it a B+ and said that it was filled with memorable choruses and that the highlight song was "Dental Care". Jesus Freak Hideout also was favorable towards the album; the review highlighted the album's musical style, saying that it had "dreamy lyrics and open soundscapes." Aaron Basiliere of PopMatters opined that Owl City "has crafted an incredibly upbeat album filled with starry-eyed lyrics and electro-pop fluff" and called the album "a welcome change." However, he was critical on tracks such as "Dental Care" calling it mundane. Sputnikmusic criticized the album for its lack of substance and called the record "a disappointment." However, they praised "Meteor Shower" for its "quaint piano and universal, down-trodden atmosphere" and "The Saltwater Room" for its additional vocals from Breanne Düren.

Tony Cummings of Cross Rhythms said that "Adam does brilliantly in creating wistfully pretty, ethereal music which is far more accessible than the work of The Postal Service... All in all, if you liked the single, you'll love the album." A mixed review came from Fraser McAlpine of the BBC. He said, "There's no denying that Adam can create a pretty picture. 'On The Wing', for example, is a valiant mix of undulating strings, ticker-tape percussion and sparkling glockenspiel which is begging for a quirky cartoon to soundtrack. On the other hand, 'Dental Care' is a string of observations about a trip to the dentist. It's not even a metaphorical or magical dentist: just a dentist." Hayden Woolley of Drowned in Sound rated the album a 6/10. She praised the "delicately uplifting strings on 'On The Wing'" and described the chorus of "Umbrella Beach" as "shimmering euro-disco." However, she noted that "plenty of songs that are flimsier than a 99p windbreaker," singling out "Dental Care" and "Vanilla Twilight".

On the other hand, Rolling Stone claimed Ocean Eyes as "disappointing", only awarding it 2/5 stars. The magazine especially criticized the slower songs, saying that forgettable tracks like "On the Wing" were "just mush." AllMusic also gave the album a total of 2.5/5, stating "Ocean Eyes ultimately winds up too sugary for its own good, though, having focused on dessert without giving its listeners any sort of meaty, substantive entrée. A handful of ballads add some sense of variety to the album's pace, but Owl City is largely a vehicle for the one song Adam Young knows how to make." The Independent gave a much more negative review describing the album as "an insultingly bad photocopy of Give Up."

== Singles ==
"Fireflies" was released as the album's first single on July 14, 2009. It climbed the Billboard Hot 100 slowly until reaching No. 7 and leaping to No. 1 the following week. "Fireflies" topped the Billboard Chart for two non-consecutive weeks, as well as topping the iTunes Top 100 Chart for several weeks. "Fireflies" was originally released as a free iTunes digital download the week the album had its digital release in the U.S., which could have contributed to the single's massive success. The song continued to make the top 10 most downloaded songs in many countries and reached No. 1 on the Official UK Singles Chart on January 24, 2010. On January 25, 2023, the song was certified Diamond by the Recording Industry Association of America denoting sales of 10 million units.

"Vanilla Twilight" was released as the album's second single on January 26, 2010, to radio, the same day that the deluxe edition of Ocean Eyes hit stores. During the same week that "Fireflies" topped the Hot 100, "Vanilla Twilight" debuted at No. 95. The song re-entered the chart and peaked at No. 72 on the week ending January 9, 2010. It was certified platinum by the RIAA in January 2023.

"Umbrella Beach" was released as the album's third and final single on May 17, 2010. "Umbrella Beach" was originally released promotionally on November 22, 2009, preceding the release of the official first single "Fireflies." An exclusive remix created by Kenny Hayes is included on the single release. A music video was released for the song and unlike "Fireflies" and "Vanilla Twilight", Young does not appear in the video, aside from a few photos.

=== Promotional singles ===
"Hot Air Balloon" premiered on the AOL Spinner Tastemaker website on May 1, 2009. The song debuted at number one on AOL Music's Top 40 Songs Chart with more than 270,000 streams in the first week and has sold over 12,400 copies. The track was later released as a digital-only promotional single on May 5, 2009, leading up to the release of the album, though it did not appear on the album.

"Strawberry Avalanche" premiered exclusively via Spin on June 1, 2009, and was released digitally the following day. The song sold over 9,000 copies as of July 2009. The song was included in the deluxe edition of the album.

"Sunburn" was released as a digital-only promotional single for the soundtrack of 90210 on October 13, 2009, and it was also released free to people who bought "Ocean Eyes" during a span of several weeks of December 2009.

"Hello Seattle" was released in December 2009, as the fourth and final promotional single. The song reached number six on the US Billboard Bubbling Under Hot 100 Singles chart and was certified Gold by the RIAA.

== Commercial performance ==
Ocean Eyes sold 20,000 copies in its debut week, and reached the top ten on the US Billboard 200, peaking at number eight. The album also topped the US Top Dance/Electronic Albums chart for four weeks. Eventually, Ocean Eyes climbed to No. 1 on the iTunes Store after the album price was lowered for a limited period of time. On the Billboard 200 2009 year-end chart, it was ranked at number 119. On the Billboard 200 2010 year-end chart, it was ranked at number 32. As of 2012, the album has sold 1.1 million copies in the US. The album also sold over four million copies worldwide. In January 2023, Ocean Eyes was certified double platinum by the RIAA.

== Awards and nominations ==
Awards and nominations for Ocean Eyes
Year	Organization	Award	Result	Ref(s)
2011	Billboard Music Awards	Dance/Electronic Album of the Year	Nominated	

=== Accolades ===
Year	Publication	Country	List
2010	Cross Rhythms	United Kingdom	"The 20 Best Albums of 2010"

== Track listing ==
All tracks are written by Adam Young, except where noted.

Standard edition
No.	Title	Writer(s)	Length
1.	"Cave In"		4:02
2.	"The Bird and the Worm"	Adam Young; Matt Thiessen	3:27
3.	"Hello Seattle" (originally from Of June)		2:47
4.	"Umbrella Beach"		3:50
5.	"The Saltwater Room" (originally from Maybe I'm Dreaming)		4:02
6.	"Dental Care"		3:11
7.	"Meteor Shower"		2:14
8.	"On the Wing" (originally from Maybe I'm Dreaming)		5:01
9.	"Fireflies"		3:48
10.	"The Tip of the Iceberg"		3:23
11.	"Vanilla Twilight"		3:52
12.	"Tidal Wave"	Young; Thiessen	3:10
Total length:			42:47

iTunes bonus tracks
No.	Title	Length
13.	"Hello Seattle (Remix)"	5:53
14.	"If My Heart Was a House"	4:06
Total length:		52:46

Japanese edition bonus tracks
No.	Title	Length
13.	"Hot Air Balloon"	3:35
14.	"Rugs From Me To You"	1:28
Total length:		47:50

Deluxe edition: disc 2
No.	Title	Length
1.	"Hot Air Balloon"	3:35
2.	"Butterfly Wings"	2:54
3.	"Rugs from Me to You"	1:27
4.	"Sunburn"	3:47
5.	"Hello Seattle (Remix)"	5:53
6.	"If My Heart Was a House"	4:06
7.	"Strawberry Avalanche"	3:18
8.	"Fireflies (Adam Young Remix)" (formerly an iTunes Exclusive)	3:12
Total length:		28:12

== Personnel ==
Credits for Ocean Eyes adapted from AllMusic.

Owl City

- Adam Young – vocals, keyboards, synthesizers, piano, guitars, bass, drums, programming, producer, engineer

Additional musicians and production

- Breanne Düren – additional vocals on tracks 5 and 8
- Austin Tofte – additional vocals on track 8
- Matthew Thiessen – additional vocals on tracks on 1, 2, 9, 12 and 14, production on tracks 2, 9, 12
- Melisa Morgan – additional vocals on tracks 7 and 10
- Jolie Lindholm – additional vocals on track 7
- Phil Peterson – cello on tracks 1, 4, 8, 9 and 10
- Steve Bursky – producer, management
- Ted Jensen – mastering
- Christopher Kornmann – art direction
- Imran Khan – artwork
- John Goodmanson – audio mixer

Recording location

- Sky Harbor Studios, Owatonna, MN
- Two Sticks Audio, Seattle, WA

== Charts ==
=== Weekly charts ===
Weekly chart performance for Ocean Eyes
Chart (2009–2010)	Peak position
Australian Albums (ARIA)	14
Austrian Albums (Ö3 Austria)	14
Belgian Albums (Ultratop Flanders)	31
Belgian Albums (Ultratop Wallonia)	34
Canadian Albums (Billboard)	18
Canadian Alternative Albums (Nielsen)	2
Danish Albums (Hitlisten)	36
Dutch Albums (Album Top 100)	42
European Albums (Billboard)	14
French Albums (SNEP)	88
German Albums (Offizielle Top 100)	7
Greek Albums (IFPI)	23
Irish Albums (IRMA)	16
Japanese Albums (Oricon)	43
New Zealand Albums (RMNZ)	16
Scottish Albums (Official Charts)	7
South African Albums (RISA)	7
South Korean Albums (Gaon)	67
Swedish Albums (Sverigetopplistan)	39
Swiss Albums (Schweizer Hitparade)	29
Taiwanese Albums (Five Music)	4
UK Albums (Official Charts)	7
US Billboard 200	8
US Top Alternative Albums (Billboard)	1
US Top Dance Albums (Billboard)	1
US Top Rock Albums (Billboard)	1

=== Year-end charts ===
2009 year-end chart performance for Ocean Eyes
Chart (2009)	Position
US Billboard 200	119
US Top Dance/Electronic Albums (Billboard)	4
US Top Rock Albums (Billboard)	32

2010 year-end chart performance for Ocean Eyes
Chart (2010)	Position
Australian Albums (ARIA)	92
UK Albums (OCC)	119
US Billboard 200	32
US Top Alternative Albums (Billboard)	3
US Top Dance/Electronic Albums (Billboard)	3
US Top Rock Albums (Billboard)	5

=== Decade-end charts ===
Decade-end chart performance for Ocean Eyes
Chart (2010–19)	Position
US Top Dance/Electronic Albums (Billboard)	36
US Top Rock Albums (Billboard)	31

== Certifications ==
Certifications and sales for Ocean Eyes
Region	Certification	Certified units/sales
Australia (ARIA)	Gold	35,000^{^}
Canada (Music Canada)	Gold	40,000^{^}
Denmark (IFPI Danmark)	Gold	10,000^{‡}
New Zealand (RMNZ)	Platinum	15,000^{‡}
Singapore (RIAS)	Gold	5,000^{*}
United Kingdom (BPI)	Gold	100,000^{^}
United States (RIAA)	2× Platinum	2,000,000^{‡}
^{*} Sales figures based on certification alone.^{^} Shipments figures based on certification alone.^{‡} Sales+streaming figures based on certification alone.
