= Hot Air Balloon (rock opera) =

Hot Air Balloon is a rock opera written in 1998 by Jon Gutwillig, guitarist and founding member of The Disco Biscuits, a Philadelphia based trance fusion jam band.

== Performance history ==
Hot Air Balloon was first performed on December 31, 1998 at the Silk City Lounge in Philadelphia. The debut was unannounced and fans attending the show were given a pamphlet containing accompanying stories for each of the songs.

The opera has been performed in its entirety nine times. (Note: Phantasytour.com included two complete, but interrupted performances in their total count.) It was also performed on April 1, 2002, but with "Aquatic Ape" replacing the title song, "Hot Air Balloon", as an April Fool's joke. However, "Hot Air Balloon" lyrics were sung during parts of "Aquatic Ape". In addition, the entire second act (and Eulogy) were played on February 3, 1999.

- December 31, 1998 at Silk City Lounge, Philadelphia, Pennsylvania
- January 24, 1999 at Center for the Arts, Natick, Massachusetts
- March 4, 1999 at The Tractor, Seattle, Washington
- May 11, 1999 at The Blue Terrapin, Elizabethtown, Pennsylvania
- June 12, 1999 at The Music Farm, Charleston, South Carolina
- October 23, 1999 at Ziggy's, Winston-Salem, North Carolina
- April 1, 2002 at Bogart's, Cincinnati, Ohio
- January 17, 2004 at the Culture Room, Fort Lauderdale, Florida
- October 31, 2007 at the Orpheum Theater, Boston, Massachusetts
- December 31, 2018 at the Fillmore, Philadelphia, Pennsylvania

== Character sketches ==
=== Corrinado ===
An unemployed wayward inventor who bounced aimlessly from idea to idea, until he invented the world's first aircraft, the hot air balloon. He was convinced by Morris Mulberry that the idea could be profitable and that the two of them should start a service shuttling people across the sea in hot air balloons. The business, called Hot Air Balloon Traveling, became successful and attracted the attention of Manilla Trane, the entrepreneur whose capital ran much of the town. Corrinado refused to sell Hot Air Balloon Traveling, and even worse, kindles a romance with Manilla's beautiful wife, Leora of the Sequoias. Manilla forcibly overtook the business and had Corrinado arrested and sentenced for building "the devil's flying machine."

=== Leora of the Sequioas ===
The young trophy wife of Manilla Trane, known throughout town as a terrific chef. She earned her nickname because of her height as well as the size of her hair, which, according to the townspeople, looked as if were held up by branches. Lack of attention from her husband turned her into an insomniac, and she was often seen late at night staring out the window of the high tower of Manilla's fortress.

=== Manilla Trane ===
Extraordinarily wealthy entrepreneur whose riches allows him to control the entire town. As a young man, he began to amass his fortune by peddling weapons. He possesses a small army of extremely loyal men who will do his every whim. An avid arts collector, he married Leora of the Sequoias on the steps of his brand new museum. He is known as an extremely demanding and unforgiving tyrant.

=== Morris Mulberry ===
A somewhat conniving, albeit benevolent, street hustler. He convinced Corrinado that the two of them could start a highly successful business by using Corrinado’s hot air balloon invention to shuttle people across the sea. He mysteriously vanished one month after Hot Air Balloon Travelling was destroyed and Corrinado was arrested.

=== Diamond Riggs ===
A well known loan-shark and old street friend of Morris Mulberry. He put up the initial capital to start Hot Air Balloon Traveling. A very aloof individual who, according to town rumor, possessed the prototype hot air balloon, which he was given as collateral for his initial investment.

== Act I ==
=== Scene I - The Overture ===
High noon - townsfolk fill the center square for lunch. There is much commotion. Horse-drawn carriages line the outer streets. Merchants are yelling their pitches into the crowd. Street performers are miming and dancing in front of onlookers. The echoing sound of the street charmer's horn can be heard ricocheting off of the buildings.

=== Scene II - Once the Fiddler Paid ===
Corrinado sits alone in his prison cell, staring out the tiny barred window, over the jagged cliffs, and out to the sea beyond. The noon sun is high, the sky is clear and a comfortable summer wind blows through his cell. He thinks about Leora, his lost loved one, and he is plagued by the haunting vision of his fate.

=== Scene III - The Very Moon ===
The scene moves to Manilla's estate, before the arrest of Corrinado. We catch a glimpse of the relationship between Manilla and Leora. Manilla has reaped the rewards of many successful business enterprises. He works too hard to pay attention to his wife Leora, needing her only as a chef. Manilla invites Corrinado and Mulberry over for dinner in order to discuss the proposition of buying Hot Air Balloon Traveling. Corrinado and Mulberry are not willing to part with the business. As the scene ends, it becomes clear that Corrinado and Leora are enamored with one another, leaving Leora wondering whether Corrinado is the man to fly her far, far away.

=== Scene IV - Voices Insane ===
The scene shifts back to Corrinado's jail cell, the night before he is to be burned at the stake. Starved and beaten, he has given in to the demons which are living in his mind. He knows that there is little chance to escape his fate, yet he dares the audience to condemn him for what he has done. Half-crazy, he sits alone in his cell dreaming of Leora, laughing aloud at the world which had condemned him.

=== Scene V - Eulogy ===
The prison guards come to take Corrinado away to be executed. He walks defiantly through the crowd as they taunt and jeer at him. He remains calm and seems completely unmoved. His gaze is fixed on the sky.

== Act II ==
=== Scene I - Bazaar Escape ===
Corrinado is strapped to a pole in the center of town. Manilla's troops are preparing the fire. Leora has arranged for his feet to be left untied. At the last moment, he pulls on his ropes with all his might, tearing himself free. He charges into the town bazaar as Manilla's troops pursue. His only chance of escaping is to make for the cliffs and jump into the sea. With a hoard of troops on his heels, he swan dives off the cliff into the sea far below.

=== Scene II - Mulberry's Dream ===
Corrinado swims through the sea, his only chance of survival is to make it to the island; hoping that Morris Mulberry will be waiting with the prototype hot air balloon, the only one left undestroyed by Manilla. As he swims, he gets delirious from pure physical exhaustion. He thinks back to his friend Mulberry and the beginning of Hot Air Balloon Traveling when Mulberry persuaded him to use his invention to start a successful business.

=== Scene III - Above the Waves ===
Mulberry stands alone on the island with the hot air balloon engine burning. He waits all night in hopes that Corrinado will make it. Eventually, he starts to despair, realizing that even if Corinado managed to escape his execution, there is no way that he could make the long swim across the ocean. He gives up all hope of Corrinado's survival, puts out the balloon engine, and sits there in the darkness. Out of the darkness, he hears someone shouting his name in a faint voice. He looks out but still he sees nothing. He thinks that his mind is playing tricks on him, and decides that it is time to move on and start his life anew. He is about to leave when Corrinado's soaking wet figure emerges from the darkness.

=== Scene IV - Hot Air Balloon ===
Corrinado embraces Mulberry. He stares in awe at the hot air balloon. The fantastic pipe dream that had become his greatest joy had also led to his persecution. He starts up the engine and takes off, flying over the sea to rescue his beloved Leora. Leora waits lying by the sea on the beach. She frets about whether or not Corrinado has survived. As dawn approaches, she sees a speck on the horizon: Corrinado has arrived. He sets his balloon down on the shore, and Leora climbs in with him. They take off together, never to be seen by anyone again, flying off into the sunrise.
