= Air Balloon (1784 ship) =

British merchant ship 1784–1829

History

Great Britain
- Name: Air Balloon
- Namesake: Montgolfier Brothers' 1783 hot air balloon
- Launched: 1784, Yarmouth
- Fate: Foundered August 1829

General characteristics
- Tons burthen: 95, or 98, or 100 (bm)

Air Balloon was launched in 1784 at Yarmouth as a coaster. She was captured in 1797. She then disappeared from United Kingdom records until 1824. She was almost rebuilt in 1825, only to suffer a major maritime incident in 1826. She was refloated and resumed sailing, but was wrecked in 1829.

== Career ==
Air Balloon first appeared in Lloyd's Register (LR) in 1784. (Note: She was one of at least two vessels launched that year, following the Montgolfier Brothers launching the first documented flight in a hot air balloon.)

| Year | Master | Owner | Trade | Source |
|---|---|---|---|---|
| 1784 | Campbell | N.Symmonds | Yarmouth–Cork | LR |
| 1797 | W.Gidney | N.Symmonds | Yarmouth–north | LR; repairs 1787 & 1791, and good repair 1796 |

On 27 March 1798, Air Balloon was sailing from Blakeney, Norfolk to Salcombe when a French vessel captured her and took her into Boulogne.

Air Balloon returned to Lloyd's Register in 1824. (Note: Between 1808 and 1824 Air Balloon may have been Elizabeth, of 95 tons, launched in 1784 at Yarmouth. What transpired between 1797 and 1808 is more obscure.) She re-entered the Register of Shipping (RS) in 1825, with information that disagreed with that in Lloyd's Register.

| Year | Master | Owner | Trade | Source |
|---|---|---|---|---|
| 1824 | C.Wilson | Fyson & Co. | Lyme coaster | LR; new deck & large repair 1819 |
| 1825 | J.Kidd | R.Watson | Southampton coaster | RS |
| 1826 | J.Kidd; J.Brown | R.Watson; Captain & Co. | Sunderland coaster | RS; almost rebuilt 1825 |
| 1827 | C.Wilson | Fyson & Co. | Lyme coaster | LR; new deck & large repair 1819 |

During the gale of 6–7 September 1826, Air Balloon, James Brown, master was driven ashore on 7 September at Whitby; her crew were rescued. She was on a voyage from Littlehampton, to her homeport of Sunderland, County Durham. Air Balloon was refloated on 17 September and taken in to Whitby.

== Fate ==
On 13 August 1829 Air Balloon sprang a leak and foundered in the North Sea off Scarborough. She was on a voyage from Sunderland to Chatham, Kent. She was sold as a wreck, refloated on 21 August and taken into Scarborough.

She was last listed in the 1829 volume of Lloyd's Register. She was last listed in the Register of Shipping in 1833, but with data stale since 1828.
